= List of My Three Sons episodes =

This is a list of episodes from the American sitcom My Three Sons. The show was broadcast on ABC from 1960 to 1965, and was then switched over to CBS until the end of its run; 380 half-hour episodes were filmed. 184 black-and-white episodes were produced for ABC from 1960 to 1965, for the first five years of its run. When the show moved to CBS in September 1965, it switched to color, and 196 half-hour color episodes were produced for telecast from September 1965 to the series' end in 1972.

== Series overview ==
Season	Episodes	Originally released			Rank	Rating
Season	Episodes	First released	Last released	Network	Rank	Rating
1	36	September 29, 1960	June 8, 1961	ABC	13	25.8 (Note: Tied with 77 Sunset Strip)
2	36	September 28, 1961	June 7, 1962	ABC	11	24.7
3	39	September 20, 1962	June 20, 1963	ABC	28	21.0
4	37	September 19, 1963	May 28, 1964	ABC	27	21.9
5	36	September 17, 1964	May 20, 1965	ABC	13	25.5
6	32	September 16, 1965	April 28, 1966	CBS	15	23.8
7	32	September 15, 1966	May 11, 1967	CBS	29	20.2 (Note: Tied with I Spy, the CBS Thursday Night Movie, and The F.B.I.)
8	30	September 9, 1967	March 30, 1968	CBS	24	20.8
9	28	September 28, 1968	April 19, 1969	CBS	14	22.8
10	26	October 4, 1969	April 4, 1970	CBS	15	21.8 (Note: Tied with Ironside and The Johnny Cash Show)
11	24	September 19, 1970	March 20, 1971	CBS	19	20.8
12	24	September 13, 1971	April 13, 1972	CBS	42	17.2

== Episodes ==
=== Season 1 (1960–61) ===
No. overall	No. in season	Title	Directed by	Written by	Original release date	Prod. code
1	1	"Chip Off the Old Block"	Peter Tewksbury	George Tibbles	September 29, 1960	0001
The main characters are presented, including the three sons: Mike aged 18, Robbie aged 14, Chip aged 7, and Tramp the dog. The basic relationships within the family are established, that Steven Douglas is of Scottish descent, and has been a widower for six years. Chip gets a phone call from Dorine Peters and he is not happy about it. Plus, his brothers tease him. Chip tells Steve that Dorine is always making eyes at him and telling him she loves him. Steve insists Chip be nice and patient with Dorine and she will probably get over her crush. Later, Bub tells the boys that Steve is having dinner with Hal (Harlan Warde) and Nancy Mosby. They apparently are always trying to find a wife for Steve. Hal and Nancy introduce Pamela MacLish (Patricia Barry) to Steve. Pamela invites Steve over to dinner the next night. Steve is under the impression that there will be other people at the dinner, but it is just him and Pamela. Steve starts to feel that Pamela has marriage on her mind. Chip gets invited to a dance with Dorine and Steve wants him to go. Dorine comes by the house and Chip asks Pamela to go to the dance with Steve. At the dance, Chip and Steve agree that they have to find a polite way to get rid of the women. Chip completes his mission, but Steve does not. George N. Neise as Salesman.
2	2	"The Little Ragpicker"	Peter Tewksbury	David Duncan	October 6, 1960	0005
The annual school rag drive starts Chip off on a scavenger hunt of the neighborhood. Every time neighbor Miss Cynthia Pitts (Marjorie Eaton) looks out the window she sees strange happenings at the Douglas household. She sees Bub outdoors waving a bottle that looks like whiskey. Later, Robbie and Mike are carrying in a dummy that she thinks is Bub in a drunk state. She tells Irene Sailor (Lois January) that she does not think the boys are getting proper care. Irene thinks Cynthia may be overreacting. When Chip goes to get rags from Miss Pitts, she feeds him and refuses to let him leave. Meanwhile, the Douglas house has no water and Bub sends for a plumber. Steve comes home and everyone is wondering where Chip is. Chip is finally able to sneak out of Cynthia's house. Later Cynthia goes over to talk to Steve about her concerns and sees Chip in his bedroom hitting the dummy. When the dummy accidentally falls out of the upstairs window, she faints on the sidewalk. Steve brings Cynthia in the house and they explain everything. Irene saw Steve carrying Cynthia and gets the wrong impression.
3	3	"Bub in the Ointment"	Peter Tewksbury	Story by : George Tibbles; Teleplay by : James Leighton, Peter Tewksbury, & George Tibbles	October 13, 1960	0002
Bub disrupts a PTA meeting at Chip's school. Mike tells Steve that a man from a state college is coming by in a couple days to interview him. Mike is worried about what Bub might say. Steve says that when their mother died, Bub came to the home to try and fill her place. They should give Bub a chance. Bub embarrasses Robbie when he comes to his class bringing the sack lunch that Robbie forgot. Bub then proceeds to make suggestions to the teacher. When Robbie complains to Steve, Steve says they should not hurt Bub's feelings. Mr. Finch from the college comes by to speak to Mike. Bub interrupts them. Steve says he will straighten Bub out, and now the boys start to feel bad. Before Steve can say anything, the boys learn that Robbie's teacher liked Bub's suggestions, Mike is in line for the scholarship to the college and no one at the PTA minded Bub's ideas. Plus, Bub buys Robbie a car motor that he wanted.
4	4	"Countdown"	Peter Tewksbury	David Duncan	October 20, 1960	0003
A missile launch, sleeping in and daylight saving time make for an interesting Monday morning. The family seems to be unusually tired. The Douglas household is a chaotic affair of lost Indian arrowheads for Chip's turn in show and tell at school, Robbie's missing trumpet and some important lost plans of Steve's that Mike has nearly burned in the incinerator. In the end, they went through all that trouble for nothing. Apparently Bub accidentally set the clocks an hour ahead instead of turning them back one hour with the end of Daylight Savings Time. This episode features the voice talent of Paul Frees narrating the missile lunch for the entire episode. Note: The official DVD of this episode uses the credits from the previous episode in error. David Duncan is the correct writer.
5	5	"Brotherly Love"	Peter Tewksbury	Paul West	October 27, 1960	0006
Judy Doucette (Cheryl Holdridge) thinks Mike is really handsome. But Gordy misunderstands and thinks she's taking about Robbie. Gordy tells Robbie that Judy would like to meet him. At the library that night, Gordy introduces Judy to Mike and Mike offers to drive Judy home. Robbie arrives just in time to see this. When Mike and Robbie cross swords over Judy, the issue widens until the whole family is involved in the argument. But it is difficult for Steve to teach his sons that violence solves nothing with a pugnacious father-in-law around. While trying to mediate a peace between Mike and Robbie, Steve and Bub get into a big argument. Seeing what their fight has caused, Mike and Robbie make up and then Steve and Bub make up. Beau Bridges as Russ Burton.
6	6	"Adjust or Bust"	Peter Tewksbury	James Leighton & Peter Tewksbury	November 3, 1960	0004
A family argument starts when there is no food in the house for dinner. Mike was unable to drive Bub to the store because many unexpected things came up. Steve says "life is just an endless series of small adjustments". Steve's theory is put to the test in just one day's discovered doings. He needs to borrow Mike's car as Mike will take the station wagon to drive Bub around. Steve must meet with a top Air Force general to discuss plans for a rocket design. The men barely fit into Mike's car. Steve drops off the general and makes plans to have him over for dinner. On the way home, the car dies, and Steve has it towed. He then has to take the bus home. Steve falls asleep and misses his stop. He winds up calling Bub from a house that is having a party. Meanwhile, Mike is waiting at the bus stop for Steve. What follows are more transportation inconveniences and missed connections. It turns out the general had to cancel the dinner plans. Kate Murtagh as Hedwig. Note: An almost unrecognizable Richard Deacon appears as a garrulous fellow bus passenger who shares a seat with Steve.
7	7	"Lady Engineer"	Peter Tewksbury	Dorothy Cooper	November 10, 1960	0035
Steve is to be teaming up with another engineer on a project and he expects to meet a man. Steve becomes enamored of his new business associate, engineer Dr. Joan Johnson (Dorothy Green), who is strictly business. Because they have to work late, Steve and Joan discuss the job over dinner. Steve tries to set a romantic mood, but things do not work out. He is tempted to continue to mix business with pleasure but finds that she thinks only about the job at hand and does not have any plans to expand her love life, despite this romantic interlude. Steve is supposed to drive Joan to the airport, but he oversleeps. He is hurt and disappointed when he finds out she left without saying something to him. It turns out Joan did call and spoke with Chip. She left a message suggesting that maybe one day they will cross paths again. John Gallaudet as Mr. Jim Guthrie. Barbra Fuller as Mrs. Phelps. Sam Flint as Dr. Johnson.
8	8	"Chip's Harvest"	Peter Tewksbury	Peggy Phillips	November 17, 1960	0007
It is the day before Thanksgiving and the boys each tell who they have invited to dinner. Mike has invited Jean Pearson (Cynthia Pepper) from next door. Robbie is bringing his teacher Miss Benson. Chip befriends Johnny Squanto (Monty Ash), who claims to be a Native American, and invited him. His brothers say he is a bum who lives near the railroad tracks in a run-down old shack. Steve decides to have a talk with Johnny. Steve starts to tell Johnny that Chip made a mistake in inviting him. But seeing his disappointment, Steve tells him he is welcome to dinner. Thanksgiving Day's turkey dinner is threatened when the Douglas' stove breaks down. They cannot get anyone to fix it that day. Johnny starts to roast the turkey in the backyard without a grill. Mike and Robbie make fun of Johnny and he leaves. Johnny returns in traditional Native American clothes. Johnny tells the story of his ancestors living on the land the Douglas house is on. With everyone else's help, the dinner is a success.
9	9	"Raft on the River"	Peter Tewksbury	Paul West	November 24, 1960	0009
Feeling left out when Mike and Robbie decide to go camping at Gunman's Gulch, a lonely Chip uses an enclosed raft his brothers helped make in the backyard, on which he and Steve spend a night, pretending to float down the Mississippi. They are accidentally locked out when it begins to rain. Steve begins to worry when he wakes up from a nap and thinks it is way past 4am and thinks that Bub has not yet returned from his pinochle game. Chip hears some strange noises and Tramp starts growling. Turns out there are some cats in the yard. Chip is scared and Steve says there's nothing to be afraid of. The rain starts leaking through the rafts roof. Chip and Steve then see a large black object in the yard and are frightened. It winds up being Bub under a tarp because of the rain. Bub tells them that it's only a little after 10 o'clock. Despite it seeming so much longer, Steve realizes they've only been out there an hour or so. The next day, Chip and Steve figure out what caused a lot of the scary noises they heard.
10	10	"Lonesome George"	Peter Tewksbury	James Allardice	December 1, 1960	0011
TV star George Gobel is in town for a benefit. Bub tells the boys that he knows George personally. Robbie and Mike tell Bub to invite George over for dinner. Bub does not think it's a good idea as Steve is out of town for a few days. The boys now do not believe Bub knows George. Meanwhile, Ken Monroe, the public relations VP for the hotel, has a full itinerary for George before the benefit. George would rather just have some quiet time. Bub goes to the hotel. Though George does not know Bub, he uses Bub to get away from Ken and the crowds and goes to Bub's house. George will spend the night at the Douglas house. Bub forgets to tell his son-in-law Steve, who returns from an out of town business trip and arrives home late at night. Neither George nor Steve know the other is there and they keep missing each other while moving about the house. Steve tiptoes around the house only to find a strange man occupying his bed. The next morning, things are a little chaotic with the family, as it usually is. But George likes it as it is just like his house. Nelson Olmsted as Keith Ditmer. Betty Bronson as Mrs. Butler. Ollie O'Toole as Taxi Driver.
11	11	"Spring Will Be a Little Late"	Peter Tewksbury	Jack Laird	December 8, 1960	0008
Robbie is baffled when his girlfriend, Peggy 'Pig' Meredith (Marta Kristen), rejects the excitement of his new motor in favor of standard feminine frills. Peggy almost falls off of a step stool and Robbie grabs her to help. But he gets her dress all greasy and she runs off crying. At dinner, Robbie gets upset when the family teases him about falling for a girl. Robbie tells Steve that he's surprised how "Tomboy" Pig suddenly changed. Robbie tries to win her over by telling the boys on the football team that no girls are allowed, knowing this will upset her as she was considered one of the guys. Later, Steve tells Robbie that everything changes including Peggy. Robbie gets flustered when Steve suggests that he ask Peggy out on a date and maybe even kiss her goodnight. Robbie does go out with Peggy, and despite it being a little awkward for him, Robbie starts to see Peggy in a different light.
12	12	"My Three Strikers"	Peter Tewksbury	Arnold Peyser & Lois Peyser	December 15, 1960	0014
The Douglas boys call a family meeting at which they demand a raise in their allowances. Steve emphatically says 'No' because the family bills are mounting and they are leaving all of their chores to be done by Bub. Steve suggests that if the boys do not like the way things are, they should go on strike. A night of sharp words is followed by some bad dreams. Chip dreams he is a baseball player. Umpire Steve calls him out and throws him out of the house. Then Chip is locked out. Robbie dreams that he has joined the French Foreign Legion. He had to join because things got bad at home after the fight with Steve and the whole town turned against him. Mike dreams that Steve is chained up and Mike urges the crowd to attack him. But then Mike changes his mind. Steve dreams that the boys are in a daze and cannot respond to him. Steve and Mike wake up and run into each other in the kitchen. They get into a heated discussion about the raises in the boys' allowances. They calm down and come to an understanding.
13	13	"The Elopement"	Peter Tewksbury	Story by : Phil Leslie; Teleplay by : Phil Leslie & John McGreevey	December 22, 1960	0012
Robbie reluctantly agrees to bring his clock collection to a Women's Club meeting. Robbie then teases Mike about next door neighbor Jean Pearson and when are they getting married. Mike and Jean are working on a Social Studies project on teenage marriages. Because he doesn't actually have any, Robbie is on a clock salvaging attempt to find historic clocks after he gets into a spot of bother with his teacher. Mike and Jean arouse the suspicions of Steve and Bub when secrets are exchanged and the two are seen leaving with suitcases. Steve and Bub go to speak with Jean's parents, Henry and Florence Pearson (Florence MacMichael). Florence finds an application for a marriage license in Jean's room. Steve, Bub and Henry go to the license bureau. They learn from a guard that the couple went to see the Judge. The men now believe the couple are married. Back at the Douglas house, Mike and Jean tell Steve and Bub they were doing research for their project against teenage marriage.
14	14	"Mike's Brother"	Peter Tewksbury	John McGreevey	December 29, 1960	0025
Steve can barely park his car in the garage because of all the junk in there. Mike mentions how he might have a part time job, but it's between him and another boy. Robbie didn't make the basketball team and complains about how the coach thinks Mike was so great. Constant comparisons to his brother, Mike, leaves Robbie feeling inferior and angry. Steve wants Mike and Robbie to build some shelves in the garage. Mike works on it one day and Robbie should finish it the next day. Robbie wants to meet up with his friend Trish so he cuts some corners finishing the shelves. Meanwhile, Mike is not doing too well at his job try out. After Steve parks his car in the garage, the shelves collapse on the car. When Steve questions Robbie about the shelves, Robbie starts complaining about Mike. Steve tells Robbie that any time he fails to do something right, he uses being compared to Mike as an excuse. Something else Steve says makes Robbie realize he's got the wrong attitude. And when Mike says he didn't get the job, Robbie realizes that his brother isn't always perfect.
15	15	"Domestic Trouble"	Peter Tewksbury	James Leighton & Peter Tewksbury	January 5, 1961	0015
In the middle of the night, Bub is suddenly called out of town. When some of the local ladies can't help the family, Steve seeks an agency to get temporary help. Steve has to get ready for work so he asks Mike to call an agency. With his older brothers passing the buck, Chip accidentally rings Domestic Bliss, Inc., a marriage seeking department. Steve gets on the phone and speaks with Mrs. Barr (Anne Seymour), who will send out a woman inspector right away. On his way to work, Steve goes to the Domestic Aide Service, who he thought he was talking to on the phone, to cancel the inspector. Mrs. Barr comes by the Douglas house and speaks with Chip. Chip shows her around the house. Steve calls Mike and tells him the Domestic Aide Service is sending a woman and be ready to meet her. Once again, the older brothers pass the buck leaving Chip to meet her. Leona shows up and Chip has her move into Steve's room. Steve comes home and Mrs. Barr shows up again. The two have a confusing conversation and then they run into Leona. Things get straightened out and Leona stays as housekeeper. Steve tells the boys no more passing the buck.
16	16	"Bub Leaves Home"	Peter Tewksbury	Story by : Arthur Dales; Teleplay by : Arthur Dales & John McGreevey	January 12, 1961	0016
Bub tells this story while waiting at the bus station. Bub complains to Steve that the boys don't pay attention to him. Steve invites his second cousin Selena Bailey (Mary Jackson) to come and visit. Selena arrives and everyone is happy to see her, she even fixes Mike's car. Selena starts doing things around the house and spending a lot of time with the boys. Bub gets the strange impression that he is being neglected and isn't really needed. He decides to take up the offer of managing a movie theater in Plainview. He tells Steve he'll be leaving that night, and nothing the boys say or do can make him change his mind. At the bus station, Selena suddenly sits next to Bub. Selena finds a subtle way to make Bub change his mind about leaving. George Dunn as Listener. Note: Arthur Dales was a pseudonym of writer Howard Dimsdale.
17	17	"Mike in a Rush"	Peter Tewksbury	AJ Carothers	January 19, 1961	0022
Mike prepares for the transition from high school to college and the question of joining a fraternity is one that complicates his life considerably. Mike and Jean attend a party as prospective applicants and Mike tells several of the guys he's not sure yet that he's going to college. When he says this, they stop talking to him. After meeting Jean, Art Landis invites Mike to his frat get together the next day. Mike tells Steve he's definitely going to college and he wants to join the frat that Art is in. Art calls the Douglas house and leaves a message that he couldn't get Mike an invite to the frat party. Mike doesn't get the message and goes to the party. Mike finds out that Jean and him have been dropped from the waiting list and he tells off Art. When Mike gets home, Jean is there. Art comes by to talk to Mike. Art explains things to Mike and they part as friends. Skip Young as George Collingwood.
18	18	"The Bully"	Peter Tewksbury	Robert Bassing	January 26, 1961	0019
Chip falls afoul of the school bully, Ralph Cole. That night at dinner, Steve mentions how he'll be away for two weeks and he hopes things will run smoothly at home. Chip isn't eating and Robbie says that he heard Ralph was picking on Chip. Steve says that while he doesn't condone fighting, Chip has a right to defend himself. Chip keeps coming home from school all bruised and tattered. One day, he comes home with a black eye. Chip also brings a note from the principal because he's getting bad grades. Bub goes to speak with Mrs. Wisbee (Mary Adams) and mentions what's going on with Ralph. Steve comes back early from his trip and goes to pick up Chip from school. He witnesses Chip attacking Ralph, who isn't interested in fighting with him. Steve soon realizes that Chip is deliberately provoking the boy each day in the school yard to prove a point. Steve also learns that Ralph has been put on probation. An unintended incident in front of Mrs. Wisbee causes Ralph to get into trouble. Knowing it could cost him detention in the principal's office, Chip confesses to her that he was the one starting the fights, not Ralph. Mrs. Wisbee decides to not punish either child, and the boys start to get along.
19	19	"Organization Woman"	Peter Tewksbury	James Leighton & Peter Tewksbury	February 2, 1961	0017
Steve's ever efficient sister Harriet (Joan Tewkesbury) arrives for a visit. Steve, however, will be out of town for the first part of her stay. Harriet would like to surprise Steve by transforming the chaos of the household into efficient calm. She gives each family member a time chart with what to do all day, which immediately changes and complicates the entire Douglas household. The challenging aspect to the whole deal is a decision that Harriet soon regrets, especially once Steve returns home early. Steve and Harriet get into an argument and Steve says something that he regrets. To make up for it, Steve tries to fit himself into the time chart. Harriet tears up all the charts. She decides that the family should act like people and not machines. Soon the happy chaos returns and something in her private life changes for the better.
20	20	"Other People's Houses"	Peter Tewksbury	John McGreevey	February 9, 1961	0029
Robbie sees his new friend Hank Ferguson's home and is envious of what he thinks is really the perfect teenage home. Robbie complains to the family about how noisy and cluttered the Douglas house is. Steve tells Bub that Robbie may have a point. Meanwhile, Hank talks to his parents about going to military school. His father, George (David White), reluctantly agrees. His mother Laura thinks he might be running away from something. The Ferguson's invite Robbie over for dinner. When a scheduling conflict arises between Hank's parents, Robbie invites Hank to stay at his house for the weekend. Hank becomes envious of the turbulent, happy-go-lucky Douglas household. Both George and Laura start to second guess their method of raising Hank. George stops by the Douglas house and sees how wild things are and how much fun Hank is having. This reinforces his feeling that he and Laura need to be less rigid at home. Something George says before he leaves makes Hank think he'll skip going to military school.
21	21	"The Delinquent"	Peter Tewksbury	Diane Honodel & James Menzies	February 16, 1961	0036
Mike and the family mongrel Tramp keep disappearing at night. Turns out Mike and his friend Tim Weede are building Jean a hi-fi set for her upcoming birthday as a surprise. They are building it in Tim's basement. Meanwhile, Jean is waiting for Mike at the Douglas house and is wondering why he's so late. She tells Bub she hasn't seen Tim in days and she thinks he has another girl. Jean goes home and late that night sees Mike coming home. He doesn't answer any of her questions as he's very tired. Things get confusing when Chip and Robbie are talking about Tramp and what he may be doing at night and Bub and Jean think they're talking about Mike. While driving Jean home from school, Mike and Tim are talking cryptically about electronics. But, Jean somehow thinks they're talking about a motorcycle gang. She then sees a police officer going to the Douglas house, but he's actually bringing Tramp home. Jean mentions the police to Mike and Tim and they perpetuate the gang story. Steve comes back from a trip and Jean tells him about the police. Steve and Jean catch Mike and Tim in the Douglas garage with the hi-fi. Andy the policeman comes by with Tramp and things get straightened out. Jean finds out about the hi-fi. She yells at Mike because she feels the fool for believing the gang story. Jean and Mike make up.
22	22	"Man in a Trenchcoat"	Peter Tewksbury	AJ Carothers	February 23, 1961	0031
Robbie is studying with Judy Doucette and he doesn't want his girlfriend Vivian Gibson (Cindy Carol) to find out. They walk past a car that has a hubcap that fell off. Robbie tries to put it back on and a man confronts him. Robbie and Judy run away. When Robbie gets home, Steve asks him why he's been reading so many mystery novels lately. Robbie sees Vivian and she makes a remark about Judy. Robbie goes to see Judy again and tells her someone in a trenchcoat is following him. Back at home, Robbie tells Mike someone is following him and points the man out across the street. Robbie asks Mike's help. Robbie leaves the house and the man starts to follow him. Mike then comes out and follows the man. The man runs off and Robbie and Mike run after him, but they lose him. The next day, Jean tells Mike that a man came to school to look through student pictures. He picks out Robbie's. Judy and Vivian each get mysterious letters. The two girls both wind up in the Douglas house cellar. Jean and her father show up. Robbie shows up and no one knows what's going on. Mike arrives and reveals he was the one that sent everyone the letters. Mike explains who the man following Robbie is and then the lights go out. But it turns out the person who was following Robbie was actually Vivian's brother, Andy. Vivian had Andy follow Robbie because she thought there was something going on between Robbie and Judy. Things do get straightened out.
23	23	"Deadline"	Peter Tewksbury	David Duncan	March 2, 1961	0034
Chip and Bub complain to Steve about things Robbie has done. Meanwhile, Mike is highly vocal in his criticism of the sports page of the high school newspaper. Edgar Loos (Woodrow Chambliss), the faculty advisor for the paper, is looking for a substitute sports editor. Agnes Finley (Charlotte Stewart) suggests Mike. Stu Walters (Mark Slade) calls Mike and overhears Mike bad mouthing him. Thinking he'll fail and to get back at him, Stu tells Mr. Loos Mike would be perfect for the job. Knowing he's been given one shot at revamping the sports page, Mike tackles the job with gusto. Things don't go well with Mike's staff. Mike has to finish the layout and write a sports article by himself in between running in a track meet and going to a dance with Jean. But it gets complicated when he's late to the dance, Jean tells him off and his layout gets messed up because of wind from an open window. Jean helps Mike fix the layout, but then Agnes walks into the room and the layout gets ruined again. Mike is about to give up, but the girls help him fix the layout before the printing deadline. Mike is glad that the job was only temporary, but then Mr. Loos assigns the editor job to him permanently. Beau Bridges as Russ Burton.
24	24	"The Lostling"	Peter Tewksbury	David Duncan	March 9, 1961	0039
Steve tells Bub that he's late coming home because he lent his car to Bernadene Foote, who works at his office. The Hawkins family moves into the vacant house across the street from the Douglas house. They have a station wagon identical to Steve's. Meanwhile, Chip begins to think it would be great to be an older brother, so he wishes for a little sister. Mary Hawkins (May Heatherly) tells her mother, Laura Thompson, to put Baby Betty in the back of the car where it's quiet. Laura mistakenly puts Betty in Steve's car. Robbie finds the baby and Chip thinks he got his wish. Bernadette calls the Douglas house and a wild sequence of events results in an improbable case of mistaken identity, the baby is somehow confused with a leg of lamb Bernadette left in Steve's station wagon. Robbie goes to the Hawkins house and borrows some baby food. John Hawkins thinks that a doll in a bassinet in his car is baby Betty. Bernadette comes to the Douglas house to pick up her leg of lamb and they learn the baby is not hers. Robbie and Steve figure out that baby Betty belongs to the Hawkins. They manage to get the baby back into the Hawkins car before it is noticed missing. Steve and Bub can't find the leg of lamb because Mike accidentally took it with him on a field trip.
25	25	"Off Key"	Peter Tewksbury	David Duncan	March 16, 1961	0043
Robbie and Steve have a conversation about how Chip always comes to Robbie with questions about things and Robbie doesn't always have an answer. Chip brags to his new playmate, Huey 'Sudsy' Pfeiffer, that his genius brother Robbie can fix and do almost anything. Chip tells Sudsy how well Robbie can play the piano and they start yelling at each other about it. Bub kicks Chip, Sudsy and Robbie out of the house. The boys go to Sudsy's house and Robbie plays the piano there. Robbie breaks one of the keys on the piano. Chip says that Robbie can fix it, but Robbie has already snuck out of the house. Robbie is looking at the inside of the Douglas piano and then heads back to Sudsy's house. Steve plays a few keys on the piano and one doesn't work, so he starts to take the piano apart. At Sudsy's house, Robbie is taking that piano completely apart. Steve fixes his piano and then gets a call from Robbie. Robbie asks a couple questions about the piano and then learns from Steve that Sudsy's mother is on the way home. Ruth Pfeiffer pulls up to the house in her car and Chip and Sudsy go out to stall her a little. Robbie gets the piano put back together before Ruth comes in. She sits down to play and wonders how the one dead key now works. Turns out Robbie didn't break the key after all. Chip tells Ruth that Robbie fixed it and she tells Robbie he's a genius. She then asks Robbie to fix several other things in the house. Steve also gets in over his head when he agrees to fix something for Ruth.
26	26	"Small Adventure"	Peter Tewksbury	Dorothy Cooper Foote	March 23, 1961	0042
Steve is away in Seattle on a business trip. He would like to call home, but figures it's too early on a Saturday morning. Bub is woken up by a dynamite blast from where they're working on a new road. Then the boys are all making noise and he can't get back to sleep. Meanwhile, Ed (Ken Christy), one of the construction workers, finds a large stick of dynamite that has somewhere and somehow survived since the end of the Second World War. The Douglas household's version of man's best friend has been known to drag home anything he can get his jaws into. This time Tramp slinks in with the large stick of dynamite Ed found. Thinking it's just a wooden stick, Mike tries to get the dynamite away from Tramp, but can't. The dynamite winds up in various places in the house. Steve gets worried when for one reason and then another he can't get through to the house by phone. Steve finally reaches Bub, but then there's a loud explosion and he is cut off. The noise was actually a thunder clap as it started to rain by the Douglas house. Tramp leaves the dynamite outside in the rain. Steve gets a hold of Robbie and finds out the noise he heard was the thunder storm. Paul Trinka as Art, construction worker. Note: From this point onwards writer Dorothy Cooper will now go by her married surname of Cooper-Foote.
27	27	"Soap Box Derby"	Peter Tewksbury	John McGreevey	March 30, 1961	0020
Trish Markle fawns all over Andy Gibson because he's building a race car for the soap box derby. Robbie decides to build a car as well. Meanwhile, Steve is in a rush to help a missile manufacturer get his project off the launch pad in a race to beat a rival company. Both Robbie and Steve are coming under increased pressure to make their projects better than their competitors. With time running short and things not going as planned, both of them quit the projects. It's not long before both are back to finish where they left off. Robbie wins his first race. But, Robbie loses his next race which happened to be against Andy. Steve's missile launch winds up being a failure and the missile had to be destroyed. Back at home, Steve and Robbie console each other on their failures. A little mishap in the garage somehow cheers them up. Richard McKenzie as Quinn. Fred Sherman as Chief Accountant. Joe Higgins as Junk Dealer.
28	28	"Unite or Sink"	Peter Tewksbury	Art Friedman	April 6, 1961	0032
Robbie and Mike want some extra pocket money but Steve tells them that they will have to earn it by themselves. Steve also mentions that sometimes it's nice to do something just for the sake of helping someone. Robbie asks milkman Harry (Robert Gothie) if he knows any way to make some money. Harry says the Jensen's need their fence painted. Bub mentions how run down their yard is. Robbie gets the job from Mr. Jensen, but it turns out that Mrs. Jensen gave the job to Mike. The brothers argue over whose job it is. Neighbor Verna Foster (Ann Morgan Guilbert) tells the boys that they need to sand the fence first and offers to get some sandpaper. Then neighbor Mr. Kincaid (Malcolm Atterbury), milkman Harry and Bub come by and everyone has a different opinion on the proper way to paint the fence. Before long several more neighbors pitch in together to help restore the yard to its former glory. While everyone's working, there's also a lot of gossip and disagreements. The day is over and the yard is beautiful. Steve finds out that Robbie and Mike didn't charge the Jensen's for their work. Bill Idelson as Pete.
29	29	"The Wiley Method"	Peter Tewksbury	John McGreevey	April 13, 1961	0038
Robbie can't seem to arouse the interest of the affairs of the heart with his new classmate Maribel Quinby. Back at home, Robbie mentions that his history teacher, Jeff Wiley, really makes the class fun. Robbie then says how much he likes Maribel, but she won't even talk to him because he's so dull. Steve tells Robbie that he should use the Wiley method to make himself more interesting. So with the help of his best friend Hank Ferguson, Robbie proceeds to try and get Maribel's attention. But the first attempt fails when Hank almost hits teacher Cynthia Pitts (Marjorie Eaton) with a bicycle. After class, Robbie and Hank try another stunt, but Maribel has already walked away. Plus, Hank gets into trouble with Mr. Wiley. Robbie manages to get Hank off the hook. He then explains to Mr. Wiley that he was trying to use the Wiley method to make himself more interesting to Maribel. Mr. Wiley tells Robbie he has to relax and be himself. Mr. Wiley asks Robbie to pick up a book for him at the library. Robbie runs into Maribel at the library. She says that she did notice him in school, but thought he wasn't interested in her. Turns out Mr. Wiley sent her to the library to get the same book that Robbie went for.
30	30	"The National Pastime"	Peter Tewksbury	Mathilde Ferro & Theodore Ferro	April 27, 1961	0028
Robbie, Mike and Bub are finding some of Chips baseball stuff in places it shouldn't be. Chip is so discouraged by his batting slump that he quits the baseball team. His brothers encourage him to return and offer to help him practice, but Chip just doesn't seem interested. Steve tells Chip to just go to the coach and tell him he wants back on the team. Chip talks to Coach Townsend (William Leslie) and the coach says he'll try to work Chip in. Steve gets a call and is told one of the parents, a volunteer umpire, has called in sick and Steve is asked to substitute. At the game, Coach puts Chip in and he gets on base. Chip thinks this will be the perfect opportunity to become the team hero. When the next player gets a hit, Chip tries to get all the way to home plate despite the Coach yelling at him to stop at third. Steve calls him out at home plate. Back at the house, Steve and Chip have a talk and Chip will still try to have fun playing baseball.
31	31	"The Croaker"	Peter Tewksbury	Arnold Peyser & Lois Peyser	May 4, 1961	0021
Chip brings in the house a bullfrog that he named Malcolm. He's going to bring him to school for show and tell on Monday. Steve is in a hurry and as he leaves, he knocks over the box that Malcolm was in, freeing the frog. Bub finds the frog. Bub discerns a marked resemblance to his Uncle Brian O'Casey in Malcolm's face. Bub then sings When Irish Eyes Are Smiling to the frog. He puts the frog in a cage and feeds him. Later, Robbie thinks Bub is talking to himself, but he's actually talking to Malcolm. Bub hides the frog, but things get confusing and the frog winds up in a pot on the dinner table. It's Monday morning and Chip goes to get Malcolm, but he's not in his cage. The boys and Bub look for the frog, but soon the boys have to leave for school. Bub comes to Chip's classroom with a bag. Bub describes the frog to the class, but then says he couldn't find Malcolm. Bub gets Chip and the class to realize that Malcolm was better off free and not in a cage.
32	32	"The Musician"	Peter Tewksbury	Dorothy Cooper Foote	May 11, 1961	0041
Robbie meets Elizabeth Martin (Sandy Descher) while she's practicing the piano. She plays very well and Robbie tells her that he plays the trumpet, even though he isn't very good. To impress her he tells her he really digs classical music, but in fact he doesn't know the difference between Puccini and Presley. She invites him to her house and Robbie sees that she lives in refined and elegant style. This causes Robbie to turn a critical eye on his own home life. Because Robbie has been to her house several more times, when she calls him, Bub invites her to dinner. Robbie's worried about what she'll think of the Douglas household. Steve tells him that if he's going to continue to see Elizabeth, she better see what the Douglas family is really like. But when she does come for dinner, the table is set up very fancy and the family are all wearing suits. Things are very awkward and Robbie just freaks out. In the end, the family and Elizabeth play a jazzy tune together. Much to his relief, Robbie learns that Elizabeth is not as high-brow as he thought. Marion Burns as Mrs. Martin.
33	33	"The Horseless Saddle"	Peter Tewksbury	Story by : Arthur Kober; Teleplay by : Arthur Kober, James Leighton & Peter Tewksbury	May 18, 1961	0030
Bub gets a C.O.D. package from Nebraska with no return address that contains a horse saddle. Meanwhile, Chip's girlfriend Dorine Peters is talking to George (Arthur Hunnicutt), who gives pony rides. He has three ponies, but Cyclone is unrideable. Because Bub wants nothing to do with it, Chip takes possession of the saddle. Flo Afton (Betsy Jones-Moreland) visits George looking for obscure items to decorate her husband's office with. Mike drives Chip to George's place to meet up with Dorine and brings the saddle with. Chip is upset when Mike sells the saddle to Flo. Cyclone breaks free and wanders off. The pony follows Flo's car. The saddle falls out of Flo's car and winds up in a garbage truck. Steve sees the saddle out of his office window and thinks he's imagining it. The pony follows the garbage truck. It's not long before Flo, George and a policeman are chasing the pony. The saddle falls out of the garbage truck by the Douglas house and Chip finds it. The pony and the crowds following it arrive. Chip winds up riding Cyclone with his saddle. Turns out Cyclone came from an old friend that sent the saddle to Bub.
34	34	"Trial by Separation"	Peter Tewksbury	AJ Carothers	May 25, 1961	0026
Graduation for Mike and his girlfriend Jean is a week away. At a dance, the two get into a little fight over Mike teasing Jean about her hair being in curlers earlier. Jean then tells Mike that her graduation present was a trip to Europe. She'll be leaving in two weeks and will be gone all summer. Jean will then be going to a different college and the two may never see each other again. Mike asks her if they are in love. They decide to try the strength of their affection by not seeing each other the week before graduation. Mike asks Bub about love and Bub starts singing a song. Mike then asks Steve about love and Steve does his best to explain it. Jean's mother Florence talks to Steve about Jean not seeing Mike in days and that something must be wrong. They decide the two families should have dinner together. At dinner, Mike and Jean explain to their parents about their experiment. While trying to plan to go to the same college, Mike and Jean wind up in another fight. But it's not long before they make up.
35	35	"The Sunday Drive"	Peter Tewksbury	AJ Carothers	June 1, 1961	0040
Robbie is trying to avoid the clutches of a girl named Mary Lou Miller. Because it's such a lovely spring day, neighbor Henry Pearson would like to take a quiet Sunday drive in the country with his wife. Jean has been studying poetry with Mike and decides to have Mike and her go on the drive as well. Steve is trying to get some work done, but Chip and Sudsy playing spacemen is distracting him. Steve asks if Chip and Sudsy could go along on the drive with the Pearson's. To avoid answering more phone calls from Mary Lou, Robbie talks his way into joining the others for the drive. Because there are now so many people, Mike says that Mr. Pearson can drive Steve's station wagon. Before they can leave, Mary Lou comes by and asks Florence Pearson if she's seen Robbie. Robbie is hiding under a blanket in the back of the car. The trip is delayed by people getting sweaters, others getting food and Florence answering a phone call. Mary Lou then asks Henry for a ride home and gets in the car. Not being able to see behind him because of all the people, Henry backs into another car. Mary Lou finds Robbie.
36	36	"Fire Watch"	Peter Tewksbury	Paul West	June 8, 1961	0037
Mike gets a summer job with the Forestry Service and he thinks it's going to be a barrel of fun. Mike's boss is Joe Mitchell (William Boyett), Steve's old Air Force buddy. The men are up in the watchtower and Mike soon realizes there isn't much to do. Several weeks pass and nothing is happening. One day two young hikers, Shirley (Candy Moore) and Roger (Tiger Fafara) come by. Mike comes down from the tower to talk to them. Joe comes back from an errand and reprimands Mike for leaving his post. More time passes and Mike is becoming restless and agitated. There is a storm approaching. Mike tells Joe that he's quitting and Joe says quit after the storm. Joe leaves the tower to check the river level. The power goes out in the tower and the wind is causing the tower to sway quite a lot. Joe is stranded down at the creek and Mike spends a harrowing time trying to stay calm. Something Joe does, helps Mike make it through the night.

=== Season 2 (1961–62) ===
No. overall	No. in season	Title	Directed by	Written by	Original release date	Prod. code
37	1	"Birds and Bees"	Richard Whorf	George Tibbles	September 28, 1961	0044
Chip announces Tramp is the father of six puppies. He also gives Steve a note about a lecture at school about adolescents and the opposite sex. Steve is concerned because he has never explained the cycle of life to his son. Steve and Bub attend the lecture which is given by Muriel Stewart (Joan Taylor). Afterwards they speak with Muriel about Chip. She says that it's time Steve spoke to Chip about girls. Muriel also asks Steve if they can meet later and discuss a certain project of hers. At home, Steve tries to talk to Chip, but the conversation keeps going off topic. Bub tries and talks about bees and pollen, which confuses Chip even more. Chip tells Robbie about the conversations and Robbie thinks that Steve is going to get married. Muriel is actually getting married, but to a man in the Navy. The next day, Chip sees Steve having lunch with Muriel at school. Chip and Robbie tell Mike what they think about Steve. Muriel comes by the house to get some phone numbers from Steve. Chip hears them talking about where to honeymoon. Something Chip says to them makes them realize Chip thinks they are getting married. Steve talks with Chip and straightens things out.
38	2	"Instant Hate"	Richard Whorf	William Raynor & Myles Wilder	October 5, 1961	0047
The good neighbor policy gets a real workout when the Douglas' tangle individually with members of the new family across the street. First Chip and Tramp have a problem with Tommy Kaylor and his cat. Robbie runs into a rude Kaylor daughter in school. Steve lectures the boys but on his way to work as he's backing out the driveway, he is delayed by a fender-denting idiot who turns out to be none other than John Kaylor. Steve doesn't quite like John's attitude. The next day, Steve and John almost bump cars again and they make some snide comments to each other. Steve notices that his secretary Marge can't get along with fellow employee Herman (Norm Grabowski). He realizes that's his problem with John. Steve tells Mike that the family should go over to the Kaylor's and welcome them to the neighborhood. Meanwhile, Bub has a confrontation with an elderly woman at the market. That night, Steve and the family visit the Kaylor's. Everyone seems to be getting along until Bub meets Aunt Marian Kaylor (Lillian Powell), the woman he had the problem with at the market. Things then get heated between everyone. Back at home, Steve figures that there are some people that one just can't be friends with. But then the Kaylor's come by to make amends.
39	3	"The Crush"	Richard Whorf	Arnold Peyser & Lois Peyser	October 12, 1961	0065
Mike excitedly tells the family about the girl he met at college, Mary Beth Jackson (Jena Engstrom). Steve tells Mike he should invite her and her family over for a cook out. When Mike brings her home to meet the family, she makes a beeline straight for Steve. Mary Beth asks Steve to maybe help her with her trigonometry. After Mike and her leave, Bub tells Steve that she definitely has a thing for him, but Steve brushes it off. Mary Beth calls Steve at his office to discuss him helping her study. Steve mentions having her over for a cook out, thinking Mike had asked, which he didn't. Mary Beth comes by the Douglas house and asks Bub if she can help with the cook out. Bub has no idea what she's talking about. Steve comes home and gets trapped into tutoring her. Mike arrives and gets a little jealous over the situation. At dinner, Mary Beth is fawning all over Steve and Mike has a few more jealous moments. Mike has a talk with Steve and tells him that he's encouraging Mary Beth. Mary Beth tells her mother that the man she is interested in is named Steve Douglas. Her mother says that Mary Beth's Aunt Rose used to date a boy named Steve Douglas. Her mother also says that she herself had a crush on him. Mary Beth finally realizes something and the next day at the cook out, she spends all her time with Mike.
40	4	"Tramp the Hero"	Richard Whorf	George Tibbles	October 26, 1961	0045
Sudsy tells Chip that his mother will let him have a dog. Sudsy says it won't be a dumb dog like Tramp. Sudsy gets a new, well-trained German shepherd, which emphasizes to Chip just how stupid Tramp is. Chip is getting tired of hearing about all the tricks that Bismarck the dog can do. Robbie calls Tramp dumb when the dog knocks over a science project he was working on. Steve tells Chip that even though Tramp can't do tricks, he's still a friend. Even Chips friends Freddie Ryan and Dianne Ferguson have dogs that can do tricks. The brothers try to teach Tramp some tricks. The next day, Sudsy and Bismarck's picture is in the paper for winning an award at the dog show. This makes Chip feel even worse. That night, at three in the morning, a neglected slow boiling pot of fat on the stove explodes into flames. Tramp's barking at a cat outside wakes the family. Chip and Hero dog Tramp get their picture in the paper. Chip and Sudsy now find they have something in common to talk about.
41	5	"A Perfect Memory"	Peter Tewksbury	Dorothy Cooper Foote	November 2, 1961	0018
Mike mentions to Steve that an old friend of Steve's, a Josephine Kringles (Patricia McNulty), came by the house. Mike then drove her to a drugstore in town. Steve goes to the drugstore and starts to reminisce about Josephine and how much he liked her. Flashback to when he was 17 and sharing a dessert with Josephine in the drugstore. He is taking her to the Class of 1931 Senior Hop that he actually has to play at. In the present, the waiter mentions that Josephine was asking about Wilson Hall that used to host senior dances. Steve goes to that hall and there's some band equipment on the stage and he starts playing a saxophone. Flashback to Steve playing saxophone at the dance. Steve gets upset when Josephine is dancing with Larry Peckinpaugh. Steve stops playing and goes to dance with Josephine. In the present, a Janitor (Ludwig Stössel) there applauds Steve's playing. The Janitor says Josephine was there earlier. Steve goes walking through a park. Flashback to Steve and Josephine having a picnic in a park and he gives her a kiss. Later, Josephine tells Steve that her father found a job in California and she'll be moving away. She says that she'll never forget him. In the present, Steve goes home and is told Josephine is coming by soon. A boy drops off a letter from Josephine. It says that she's sorry she won't be coming by. She thanks Steve for the wonderful memories of their youth and signs the letter Josephine Kringles Peckinpaugh. Note: This episode was actually filmed the previous season and held over for telecast.
42	6	"Bub's Lodge"	Richard Whorf	Shirl Gordon	November 9, 1961	0057
Bub and Mike are at odds with each other because both are trying to get into different, exclusive clubs. Mike is rushing for a fraternity. Bub is to be installed as the D'Artagnon of the East Door in the Brotherhood of Cavaliers lodge. Doug (Stuffy Singer) and Marty, who are also rushing for the fraternity, come by. Mike is embarrassed when they see Bub in his lodge uniform. The next night, Doug and the boys call Mike and make fun of Bub. Bub picks up the extension phone and hears Mike and the boys talking about him. The fraternity boys come by the house hoping to see Bub dressed up. Then some of Bub's lodge members come by to pick him up and they're all dressed up. Mike is again embarrassed. Steve sees this and tells Mike he should stick up for his grandfather, but Mike is upset. Later, Mike is subjected to his initiation which involves pretend fishing in front of the local drug-store. Mike doesn't know, but Steve is seeing the whole thing. Back at home, Steve makes Mike realize that the silly things Bub did for his lodge is no different than the silly thing Mike did for the fraternity. Mike waits up for Bub to come home and they both reach an understanding. Doodles Weaver as Max.
43	7	"A Lesson in Any Language"	Richard Whorf	Danny Simon	November 16, 1961	0060
Mike has a Spanish test next week and he believes he has an easy way to pass it. His friend Russ Burton (Beau Bridges) has a Spanish tutor for him. Mike is even going on a skiing trip over the weekend. Turns out Russ's tutor is a Spanish language record. While one sleeps they learn Spanish via osmosis. Before he leaves for his trip, Mike sets up the turntable to a timer so it will turn on and then off during the night. That night, Steve decides to sleep in Mike's room because Bub painted his. The record turns on during the night and the next morning Steve speaks Spanish here and there. Steve can't understand how he suddenly knows Spanish. Steve is at work and can't explain to co-worker Joe Walters (Bill Erwin) how he's speaking Spanish. Joe thinks Steve is taking a South American job. That night, because Bub painted his own room, he'll sleep in Mike's room. The next morning, Bub is speaking Spanish. The two finally figure out about the record. Steve comes up with a way to teach Mike something else important. Steve gets a raise in pay from Joe to keep him from taking the other job.
44	8	"The Ugly Duckling"	Richard Whorf	Edward J. Lakso	November 23, 1961	0046
Robbie is heading for an "F" in world literature. Plain looking, but smart, Carrie Marsh offers to help Robbie with his studies, but he turns her down. Teacher Mr. Teel introduces a new student named Beverly Mason. She is quite beautiful and Robbie is attracted to her right away. In class, when Robbie is asked to read The New Knighthood by Rudyard Kipling, he struggles. Carrie feels sorry for him. Back at home, Robbie goes on about Beverly just as Carrie comes by and brings some books she thinks might help Robbie. Robbie is very cold to Carrie and the family can't believe how he treated her. Carrie's feelings are hurt because of the way Robbie treated her. The next day at school, handsome Charlie Willart tries to make time with Beverly. Robbie is thrilled when Mr. Teel assigns Beverly as his study partner. Carrie is hurt by this, as she feels that Robbie is being rewarded for bad behavior. That night, Beverly comes to Robbie's house to study. Robbie quickly discovers that Beverly is not as smart as she is pretty. Charlie is teamed up with Carrie. He finds Carrie annoying while Carrie finds him annoying. After a few days, when an annoyed Carrie comes to Robbie's house and demands that he give her back the books she lent him, Charlie convinces Robbie to trade partners. Charlie is happy with pretty Beverly and Carrie is happy to be with Robbie.
45	9	"Chip's Composition"	Richard Whorf	Elroy Schwartz & Glenn Wheaton	November 30, 1961	0050
A composition titled "What My Mother Means to Me" has Chip baffled. Steve starts to describe Chip's mother, but then he says that Chip should ask the teacher if he could write about something else. Meanwhile, Robbie keeps getting phone calls from Bonnie. She can't get up the nerve to ask Robbie out, so she keeps asking about homework assignments. Chip asks Mike what Mom was like. Mike has a talk with Steve and says they're going to have a problem with Chip. Chip trades his lizard to Sudsy so that Chip can watch what Sudsy's mother does. Mrs. Pfeiffer finds out what Chip did and invites him to dinner. Chip comes home from Sudsy's house and says he wishes he had a mother. Steve has a talk with him. After interviewing other mothers in the neighborhood, Chip makes a courageous effort to improvise by writing about his own Grandfather, whom he feels is the most maternal person he knows. Chip's teacher, Mrs. Bergen (Natalie Masters), asks the family to come to the PTA meeting. There the family is surprised when Chip is asked to read his composition and they realize the story is about Bub. John Gallaudet as Mr. Pfeiffer. Note: The audience gets to see a photo of Steve's late wife, the mother of the three sons.
46	10	"Mike in Charge"	Richard Whorf	George Tibbles	December 7, 1961	0070
Steve and Bub are both called out of town and Mike urges them to leave him in charge. Robbie and Chip immediately try to take advantage of Mike. Mike finds the role of mother hen is harder than it looks when he is called to Chip's school because of a problem between Chip and a girl classmate. After dinner, Mike has to put his foot down to get Chip and Sudsy to study and Robbie to do the dishes. Steve calls and Mike says everything is fine. Sudsy is staying over, but during the night he says he doesn't feel well and wants to go home. Mike calls Mrs. Pfeiffer and she says that letting Sudsy sleep with an adult usually makes him feel better. Mike has a hard time sleeping with Sudsy. The next morning, Robbie and Mike have an argument over Robbie going out that night. Later, Mike's worth is really put to the test when he learns that Robbie and Hank have been taken to hospital after an accident at school. Turns out that Robbie and Hank are OK. Mike is relieved when Steve and Bub come home. June Walker as Annie.
47	11	"Bub Goes to School"	Richard Whorf	Paul David	December 14, 1961	0054
Even though he doesn't know the answers to the boys questions, Bub is upset that they don't ask him. Bub decides to go to adult night school. There he meets Margaret Cunningham (Harriet E. MacGibbon). He passes himself off as a former show business producer. Bub learns that Margaret lives in a fancy neighborhood and is a widower. During the following classes, Bub keeps making out to be a show business big shot. After one class, Bub walks Margaret to her car and it's a large limousine. Bub thinks she's a high society dame, when in fact she's really a maid. He later tells Mike that he realizes he's told too many lies. Mike makes Bub feel better and tells him to call Margaret. An awkward moment occurs when Bub calls Margaret and she has to pretend he called a wrong number. At the next class, Margaret cancels a date she and Bub had. One night, Bub decides to tell Margaret that he's a big phony. He goes to what he thinks is her house and sees her in her maid uniform. They both understand they were just trying to impress each other and they go out for the evening. Jerry Ziesmer as Young Man. Note: Prior to this episode, Bub's first name was Michael. But in this and future episodes, it was changed to William with no explanation.
48	12	"Robbie's Band"	Richard Whorf	Robert O'Brien	December 21, 1961	0069
The Douglas household is tormented by the discordant rehearsals of Robbie's band. When the band hears that Steve plays the saxophone, they ask him for help. Steve doesn't want to interfere. But after a while, Steve steps in to help them. Meanwhile, Mike's College fraternity is looking for a band to play their annual dance. Robbie suggests his band, the Temple Troubadours. Knowing they'll play for cheap and that Steve has been working with them, Mike sets up an audition. After a shaky start, the audition goes pretty well and they get the job. It's the day of the dance and Hank hurt his lip and can't play. Steve comes home from a trip and gets talked into filling in for Hank. The dance is a success. Richard Bellis as Carl.
49	13	"Damon and Pythias"	Richard Whorf	Gail Ingram Clement	December 28, 1961	0074
Robbie and Hank decide to join a club together to be like Damon and Pythias. Robbie is also fed up with being compared to his brother Mike all the time. Mike finds a jacket he wore when he was in the Vikings club at school. He gives it to Robbie and says he got Robbie in the club. Robbie wants nothing to do with the jacket or the club. He tells Mike that he's going to join the Chieftains club because Mike was never in that one. Mike tells Steve that the Chieftains are a bunch of snobs and they'll never accept Robbie. Steve says they have to let Robbie make his own mistakes. Don, the president of the Chieftains, is telling two other members that Robbie's place is an open-house. They will let Robbie in the club to use him and his house. Robbie is told he's in the club, but they won't take in Hank. Robbie tells a disappointed Hank that he's not in the club. The club throws a big party at Robbie's house. Robbie is upset that he pretty much has to ignore Hank now and that Hank couldn't get into another club. Hank comes by and tells Robbie that Mike got him into the Vikings. Hank thanks Robbie for getting Mike to do it. Robbie admits he had nothing to do with it. Mike than says he didn't talk to the club. Hank is excited thinking he now got in on his own. Later, Mike tells Robbie he did talk to the club. Robbie tells Mike and Steve that he quit the Chieftains. Robbie asks Mike if he can get him into the Vikings. Steve tells Robbie that he should ask Hank to get him in. Buddy Joe Hooker as Hal.
50	14	"Chip Leaves Home"	Richard Whorf	Joanna Lee	January 4, 1962	0048
Chip and Sudsy come to the house and Bub and Robbie start yelling at Chip for things he's done. Sudsy leaves and Chip goes upstairs. Mike tells Bub and Robbie that they shouldn't have embarrassed Chip in front of his friend that way. Mike says Chip might rebel and maybe even run away from home. Chip overhears what Mike said. Chip asks Steve if he would miss him if he weren't around. Steve makes light of the question, but then gets upset with Chip for cutting up the evening paper. That night, Chip puts a note in Tramp's collar and leaves the house. Chip gets into town but is scared and goes home. That morning, Robbie sees Chip is not in bed and finds the note on Tramp. Steve calls the police to report a missing child. Steve has an irritating conversation with the Police Sergeant (Howard Caine). Tramp leads Mike and Bub to the attic where they find Chip asleep. Steve is furious but Mike says to ignore Chip otherwise he might do it again. Chip is in the attic for quite some time and the family is getting worried. They don't know Chip is having a great time. Mike keeps trying to use child psychology, but Steve has had enough and is going to get Chip. Mike convinces Steve and Bub to try one more thing, but they don't know Chip is asleep. They wait downstairs not knowing Chip left the attic and got into his bed. When they don't find Chip in the attic, Steve calls the police again. The Police Sergeant says they'll be over right away. Robbie finds Chip in his bed. Steve and Chip have a nice talk together.
51	15	"The Romance of Silver Pines"	Richard Whorf	Jack Laird	January 11, 1962	0063
Steve takes a week's vacation from the family to stay at a wilderness fishing lodge called Silver Pines. Steve just hopes for some peace and quiet. He meets Ed Wallace (Ed Begley), an elderly gentleman who is in the next room. Ed immediately invites Steve on a picnic with Ed's wife, Rusty (Irene Ryan), and a woman named Fran Borden (Jan Clayton). Steve tries to get out of it, but Ed won't take no for an answer. Steve meets Rusty and Fran. Fran is quite unsociable towards Steve. They all head out for the picnic and some fishing and it's obvious that Ed and Rusty are playing matchmaker. When they get to where they were going to fish, the creek is dried up. And because Ed thought they'd catch enough fish, Rusty didn't bring any sandwiches. Fran tells Steve that she was hoping for peace and quiet and was forced by the Wallace's to go on this picnic because of him. Steve points out that he only came along on the trip to appease the Wallace's. Fran now understands and is friendlier to Steve. Ed has already made plans for the next day. When the plans are cancelled because Ed isn't feeling well, Steve and Fran spend a peaceful morning together. They talk about their children and then they kiss each other. But then Ed and Rusty show up. The next day, Ed and Rusty are getting ready to head home. Something Ed says makes Steve and Fran realize why he was so pushy. Steve and Fran feel bad for the way they acted towards the Wallace's. Steve and Fran decide to return home early to see their families. Dal McKennon as Mac Ivers. Note: Tim Considine (Mike), Don Grady (Robbie), and Stanley Livingston (Chip) do not appear in this episode.
52	16	"Blind Date"	Richard Whorf	George Tibbles	January 18, 1962	0075
Because he already has a date for the dance, Hank talks Robbie into taking Janie Miller (Trudi Ames), the daughter of a friend of his mother's. Meanwhile, Mike gets talked into a blind date, but he has to pretend to be a boy named Bob. The girl's name is Bonnie Walters and she will pick Mike up at his house. Sudsy is at the Douglas house. Everyone else is busy, so he answers a phone call from Hank. Hank gives Sudsy the address where Robbie is supposed to pick up his date. Thinking the call was for Mike, Chip calls his fraternity and leaves a message with the address. Bonnie shows up at the Douglas house and meets Robbie. She is taller and older than Robbie was expecting. Mike picks up a younger Janie. Robbie does the best he can, but Bonnie is having a miserable time. Janie, on the other hand, is having a great time with Mike, but Mike is quite bored. Mike and Janie are leaving a restaurant when they run into Steve and Helen (Marjorie Stapp). Steve is surprised how young Janie is. Mike and Janie are now in a malt shop when Robbie, Bonnie and Hank show up. Hank figures out that the two dates got mixed up.
53	17	"Second Time Around"	Richard Whorf	Kitty Buhler	January 25, 1962	0072
Pamela MacLish (Patricia Barry), an old friend of Steve's, runs into him at a restaurant. After she leaves, Steve tells Ed Giles (George Cisar) that the two had one dinner together and she kind of scared him off. Pamela tells her friend Meg that she's still interested in Steve. When Meg finds out that Steve has an Irish father-in-law, she gives Pamela a reason to visit the Douglas house now and then. Pamela should talk to Bub about an Irish Club she knows of and then hopefully she'll run into Steve more often. Pamela keeps finding reasons to come by the house and Bub starts to think she is interested in him. As often as she does come by, she never runs into Steve. Mike and Robbie mention to Steve about Pamela always being around and how Bub acts towards her. One night when Bub is to see Pamela he wears a fancy suit and has on a toupee. Steve meets with Pamela to tell her that Bub is falling for her. While Pamela would like to be Bub's friend, she will let him down easy. Bub has been sulking for a couple days. Something the boys do finally gets Bub back to his old self. Wally Brown as Max. Richard Reeves as Smitty.
54	18	"The Girls Next Door"	Richard Whorf	Bud Freeman	February 1, 1962	0061
Steve tells the boys that he'll be working from home for the week on an important project and he'll need quiet. Four attractive American Airlines stewardesses rent the Pearson's house next door. Bub and the boys befriend Ann Stoeffer (Kaye Elhardt), Ellen (Marlyn Mason), Georgia (Barbara Lyon) and Dodo right away. Steve is trying to get some work done and the boys and the ladies are making a lot of noise outside. Steve asks them to stop and Chip says that Steve is crotchety. One night, the ladies are having a party for Ellen's birthday. Steve is trying to work and is annoyed by all the noise from the party. He tries calling them, but the line is busy. Steve goes over to the house and complains about the noise. The next day, the boys are upset with Steve because he called the police on the ladies. Steve says he didn't call the police. The boys go next door to tell the ladies it wasn't Steve that made the call. Ann comes by to apologize to Steve, but some of the things he says really makes Ann mad. The next day Steve leaves for the Pentagon. When Steve gets on the plane, Dodo and Ellen are on the same flight. A Dr. Gordon tells Steve that the two stewardesses just helped save a three month old baby's life. After the trip, Steve visits the ladies to apologize and brings some humble pie.
55	19	"Bub Gets A Job"	Richard Whorf	Teleplay by George Tibbles; Story by Robert & Judith Specht	February 8, 1962	0080
A magazine article on bored homemakers suggests getting a part time job. Bub mentions it to Steve and Steve says that everyone gets restless once in a while. Bub then decides against another job. After the boys annoy Bub, he tells Steve he's going job hunting the next morning. Things do not go well with Bub's First Interviewer (Bryan O'Byrne). Bub then goes to the Philbrick Electric Company and that interview doesn't go any better. That night the boys cook dinner and it's not too good. Steve tells Bub that he knows someone at the Philips Company department store. They need salesmen and Steve's friend put in a good word for Bub. Bub gets the job and the first day it's hard for him to be polite to a Lady Customer (Geraldine Wall). On another day, Bub has words with floorwalker Mr. Tully (Jonathan Hole). Bub has problems when he tries to fit a jacket on a boy with an ice cream cone. The boys are starting to miss having Bub around. Steve thinks it won't be long before Bub's temper gets the best of him. After an embarrassing encounter with a Mr. Dennis (Raymond Bailey), Mr. Tully fires Bub. Bub is happy to be back with his annoying grandchildren. Rusty Stevens as Cletus Bleeker.
56	20	"Le Petit Stowaway"	Richard Whorf	Dorothy Cooper Foote	February 15, 1962	0071
Chip is all set to go on a business trip with his father to Chicago for the weekend. Chip wants to brag about the trip to his friend Sudsy. Joe Walters (Bill Erwin), Steve's boss, comes by the house. He tells Steve that plans have changed and Steve must go on a highly classified trip to Paris. Chip can't go on the trip. Steve explains to Chip on the way to the airport. Once at the plane, Steve meets Captain Maynard (Bert Remsen), who gives him his written orders. As the family is heading towards the car, Chip sneaks onto the plane. The family don't notice until the plane has taken off. At the Paris airport, Chip can't find Steve. Out on the street, Chip runs into a little French girl named Marie (Beatrice Richter). She takes Chip to her father and he brings Chip to his wife, who works at the Eiffel Tower restaurant. Mama speaks English and says when she gets off work they will call the hotel and find Steve. Steve and Captain Maynard walk into the tower restaurant and Steve sees Chip from behind, but doesn't know it's him. Marie takes Chip around to a few places in town. Walking in town, Steve thinks he saw Chip but knows it can't be him. Steve goes to a public phone to call home. Outside the phone booth are Chip and Marie. Bub tells Steve about Chip being on the plane and when Steve turns around, he sees Chip. Steve pretends to not know Chip, but then Steve forgives him and Chip apologizes. Steve, Captain Maynard, Chip and Marie go off together.
57	21	"Robbie Valentino"	Richard Whorf	Paul David	February 22, 1962	0064
Bub is bar-b-quing and it doesn't turn out well. Even Tramp won't eat the meat. Robbie mentions that a Film maker is in town to do a documentary on Robbie's physics class. Bub says that it's one way for Robbie to get into show business. At school, teacher Miss Harris (Nancy Kulp) introduces the director of the film, Edward Murry. Mr. Murry lets the class know that he is not a big time Hollywood director, he's just with a small company. He then proceeds to observe the class doing their work. Robbie and Marilyn Turnthurston are chosen for a close up shot, showing what they are doing in physics. At home, Robbie tells Bub that he just has a small part in the film. Bub says there are no small parts, just small actors. Bub tries to coach Robbie with his one line. Robbie and Marilyn are rehearsing and her boyfriend Chuck comes by. Chuck and Robbie give each other a fat lip. The next day filming starts and Robbie is very nervous and overacts his part. Later, the film is being shown at school. Robbie's face is cut out of the scene and another voice was used. Only Marilyn can be seen. Robbie and Chuck become friends and Marilyn hangs out with the drama club.
58	22	"The Masterpiece"	Richard Whorf	Gail Ingram Clement	March 1, 1962	0067
Sudsy makes fun of a picture Chip is drawing for a homework assignment. The pictures will be shown at an open house at school. Meanwhile, Robbie made the wrestling squad and Mike is helping Robbie work out. Chip tries redoing his picture several times and neither Mike, Steve nor Bub can figure out what he has drawn. Bub draws a sailboat for Chip to keep. Because of something Robbie says, Chip signs his name to the picture. He then turns it in to his teacher, Mrs. Bergen. The day of the open house, Chip tries to keep Steve and Bub from seeing his picture. Chip's picture isn't on the wall where it should've been. Mrs. Bergen explains that Principal Shutley (Gilman Rankin) wanted the best picture from the class and she gave him Chip's picture. The picture will be entered into an art contest and the winner and the picture will be put in the newspaper. Chip plans to steal the picture back, but Sudsy tells he what kind of trouble he could get into. That night, Chip has a dream that he's in jail for taking the picture and Sudsy is his lawyer. The next day, Chip talks to Sudsy's father, Mr. Pfeiffer, because he's a lawyer. When Mr. Pfeiffer doesn't get any information from Chip, Sudsy tells his father about the picture. Mr. Pfeiffer calls Bub and tells him the situation. Mike's training has caused Robbie to lose weight and Robbie is thrown off the team. Bub and Steve talk to Mr. Shutley and they hope Chip will confess on his own. Chip does something to make everything work out for the best.
59	23	"A Holiday for Tramp"	Richard Whorf	Dorothy Cooper Foote	March 8, 1962	0062
Steve is returning from a business trip by train. He learns from passenger Mrs. Bradshaw (Reta Shaw) that actress Marisa Montaine (Eve Arden) is on board. She doing a book signing tour for her autobiography. The family is at the train station to meet Steve. Tramp is along and he's tied to the car. Tramp gets loose and boards the train, which then leaves the station. Tramp winds up in Marisa's room and wakes her up. Marisa asks her assistant, Brownie (Maudie Prickett), to get rid of the dog who she now calls Whiskers. Marisa arrives in Chicago and starts to take Tramp to the pound. Back at home, everyone is still looking for Tramp. Marisa has second thoughts and brings Tramp to her hotel room. Just when she starts to grow fond of Tramp, a message comes from the railway station saying they found the owner of the dog. Marisa brings Tramp back and Chip she's her and Tramp in the car. Marisa sadly says goodbye to Tramp and leaves. Lois January as Mrs. Nichols. Charles Seel as Conductor. Johnny Silver as Chauffeur.
60	24	"The Big Game"	Richard Whorf	Gail Ingram Clement	March 15, 1962	0052
Steve stops at the drugstore to pick up some medicine as Chip has a cold. He runs into Mike and Mike goes to wait in the car. Teacher Miss Fisher (Nancy Kulp) comes by. She tells Steve that Robbie is not doing well in mathematics as he is all wrapped up in football. Back at home, Steve tells Robbie if he doesn't pass Friday's math test, he cannot play in the big football game. Robbie is trying to study but he's getting frustrated with fractions. He comes up with the idea of trying to catch Chips cold so he wouldn't have to go to school and take the test. That night, Robbie has a dream that he has a fever. The next morning, Robbie is still healthy. At school, Robbie passes the test because there were no questions about fractions. Turns out Chip now has the measles and Steve says Robbie might get it. It's the day of the game and Robbie is fine. Steve tells Robbie he doesn't deserve it, but he can go and play. Robbie goes down the stairs and twists his ankle.
61	25	"Chip's Party"	Richard Whorf	Howard Leeds	March 22, 1962	0076
Chip's 10th birthday is coming up and he doesn't want a party. Some of his classmates try to talk him into one. Steve tells the family that one doesn't have a birthday party for the presents, it's about friendship. When you ask a person to your party, it's because you want them to share a special time in your life. Chip then decides to have the party. Sudsy's mother offers to help Bub with the party if he needs it. Dr. Foster comes by the house and tells the family that Steve has the German measles. The Doctor doesn't think they have to cancel the party because Steve should be fine in a few days. Word spreads between the mothers about Steve and his disease gets exaggerated. Steve is feeling better but won't make the party because of the work he has to catch up on. It's the day of the party and the house is all decorated. Calls start coming with mothers saying their children can't come to the party because of Steve's measles. At school, Chips class throws him a surprise birthday party. Lois January as Mrs. Brubaker.
62	26	"Casanova Trouble"	Richard Whorf	Muriel Roy Bolton	March 29, 1962	0056
Chip and Sudsy are hiding from two girls because the girls want to walk the boys to school. Meanwhile, Steve's secretary Julie Evans is very distracted and Steve asks her why. Julie thinks her thirteen year old daughter Linda (Brenda Scott) is in love with an older man. Julie knows the guys name starts with an M, but she can't get any other information out of Linda. The next day, Julie tells Steve she found Linda's diary and wonders if it would be right to look in it. Robbie asks Linda to stop calling him Marlon as it's embarrassing. Without Mike knowing it, Robbie borrows Mike's fraternity pin to replace a missing button on his shirt. A mix up, caused by the borrowed fraternity pin, causes Steve to think it is Mike who is dating the Linda. An angry Steve goes home and accuses Mike of being with Linda. Mike has no idea what Steve is talking about. Steve leaves to answer a phone call. Robbie tells Mike that Linda took Mike's fraternity pin from him. Robbie tells Steve that Linda calls him Marlon and makes up stuff about him in her diary. Steve goes to talk to Julie. He tells her that Linda has a crush on Robbie, they're not dating and everything that Linda put in her diary is made up. Linda comes home and tells Julie and Steve she now has a crush on another boy. Chip and Sudsy find out that the two girls who followed them around are now after two other boys.
63	27	"The Pencil Pusher"	Richard Whorf	Howard Leeds	April 5, 1962	0049
Bub has baked a cake that is to be dessert after dinner and no one is to touch it. Mike and Robbie each create a distraction and steal a piece of the cake. Chip comes home with a black eye he got in a fight. When Bub goes to get something to put on the eye, Chip steals a piece of cake. Steve comes home and Chip tells him the reason for the fight. It seems that Danny Miller said that his father had an important job because he's a fire chief and Steve was nothing but a pencil pusher. Chip told Danny that Steve is a test pilot. Steve tells Chip that he is an aeronautical engineer which sounds as boring as a pencil pusher to Chip. Bub suggests to Steve the he take Chip to his work place. At the air base, Steve shows Chip all the Air Force planes. Chief Miller comes by and shows Chip and Steve some of the fire fighting equipment. Chip is having a good time. Steve then shows Chip his office and where he draws up plans. Chip is unimpressed with the office. However, when Steve is asked to help a pilot land a plane that is malfunctioning, Chip gets a different view of his father's job. William Tannen as Colonel.
64	28	"Innocents Abroad"	Richard Whorf	Dick Conway & Roland MacLane	April 12, 1962	0053
Mike needs some money to buy a scuba outfit, but Steve tells him to earn the money. Wally Osborne (Roy Engel), an old college friend of Steve's, calls. Steve invites him over for dinner. After dinner, Steve and Wally reminisce about old times. Wally mentions how when they needed money back then, they just went to another town and got a job. And they didn't tell their parents they were going. Mike gets the idea to just pick up and leave for Glenville to work for two weeks. The next morning, Mike and Robbie leave a note for Steve and head off. Steve believes they'll be home before dinner. The boys wind up at Mrs. Hansen's boarding house. Another one of her boarders is Mr. Gifford who works at the local cannery. Mr. Gifford says it's hard work, but Mrs. Hansen talks him into giving Mike and Robbie a job. One day of work and the boys are exhausted. Steve finally gets a letter from the boys and they say they're working and doing fine. He travels to Glenville to see how the boys are doing. Steve overhears the other boarders say how well raised Mike and Robbie are and what hard workers they are. Robbie and Mike admit they're homesick, but Steve taught them to finish what you started. Steve is very proud and knows they're OK. Jose Gonzales-Gonzales as Jose.
65	29	"Robbie the Caddy"	Richard Whorf	Mannie Manheim & Arthur Marx	April 19, 1962	0051
Robbie needs some money for a new carburetor. Hank tells Robbie he should be a golf caddy at the Bryant Hills Golf Club Tournament. At the Golf Club, Pro Golfer Danny Donnigan (Robert J. Wilke) complains about the caddy he was given during his practice round. No one else will volunteer to be the temperamental golfers caddy. Hank and Robbie show up and Robbie is assigned to be Danny's caddy. It's the day of the Tournament and Robbie meets Danny. Danny begins by playing very well. Then one of Danny's drives goes into the rough. Robbie finds the ball, but accidentally moves it. This makes it easy for Danny to hit the ball onto the green. Robbie tries to tell Danny what happened, but isn't able to. It's the end of the day and the first round of the tournament is over. Robbie tells Mike what happened and Steve overhears it. Steve tells Robbie that even though it will disqualify him, Danny needs to be told. The next day, Steve tries to talk to Danny, but Danny won't listen. Danny wins the tournament. In the locker room, Steve is able to tell Danny what happened. Steve will leave it up to Danny to do the right thing. The next day, they see in the newspaper that Danny came clean and disqualified himself.
66	30	"Coincidence"	Richard Whorf	Dorothy Cooper Foote	April 26, 1962	0058
It's Steve's day off from work and he would like a little peace and quiet. But the household and the boys are anything but quiet. Steve admits to Bub that there have been times he wished he had a house full of girls. Steve drives into town for some pipe tobacco. Along the way he picks up Billy Longfellow (Billy Barty), who claims to have missed his bus. Mike is in town and sees Steve in his car. Because Billy is so short it looks as though Steve is talking to himself. Steve and Billy are talking about Steve's loud household. Steve drops Billy off. Billy gives Steve a coin for good luck and suggests a shortcut back. Steve runs out of gas in front of a house. As he goes up to the door there's a dog that looks like Tramp. A little girl named Kit Anderson (Susan Gordon) lets Steve in to use the phone. The inside of the house looks exactly like the Douglas house. He meets older sisters Bobbie (Barbara Parkins), which is short for Roberta and Mike, which is short for Michelle. Bobbie asks Steve advice on boys and tells him her mother Irene (Mary Jackson) is a widow. Steve then meets the girls grandmother, Mub (Verna Felton), who takes care of them while Mother works. Back at home, Steve tells the family about how much the Anderson household resembled theirs. Everyone thinks Steve just imagined the Andersons. Steve brings them to the house. The door is open and when Steve goes inside, the house is completely vacant. The family is now worried about Steve. It turns out the Andersons did move and also picked up Billy Longfellow. They also get a shortcut from Billy and then stop to ask for directions. They just happen to stop at the Douglas house. Irene explains the quick move and she brings in the family so Steve can introduce them to his family. Billy just happens to show up at the house as well.
67	31	"Air Derby"	Richard Whorf	Lou Breslow & Joseph Hoffman	May 3, 1962	0059
Robbie wakes up the family with his early morning testing of his model airplane engine. Robbie wants to compete in the upcoming Junior Air Meet to win a $500 scholarship bond. A boy named Harold (Roly-Poly) Bates (Joey D. Vieira) is also competing. Roly is delivering some groceries to Bub and Bub tells him to store some of the cans in the garage. Robbie thinks that Roly was trying to take a look at his plane which was also in the garage. Steve thinks that Robbie wants to use the bond to go to college, but Robbie just wants to cash it in. Steve is at the Hobby Shop and overhears Mr. Bates (Ed Prentiss), Roly's father, complain to the owner about a purchase Roly made. Apparently, he can barely afford to clothe and feed Roly and doesn't want the boy spending money on silly things. Steve learns from Pop Johnson, the owner, that Roly has a bright future in aeronautics. Robbie hears from Chip that Steve would really like to see Roly win the Meet. The day of the Meet, Steve apologizes to Robbie for saying that he'd like Roly to win. Steve also says he's proud of Robbie and hope he wins. At the Meet, Robbie is in second place behind Roly and it's time for their final flights. The wing on Roly's plane gets broken. Robbie could have Roly forfeit, but he gives Roly time to fix the plane. The boys do their final flights. Robbie winds up crashing his plane and Roly wins. Robbie claims a part came loose on the plane, but Steve finds out that Robbie intentionally crashed the plane. Chick Hearn as Announcer. Butch Patrick as Little Boy.
68	32	"Too Much in Common"	Richard Whorf	John McGreevey	May 10, 1962	0055
Steve mentions to Bub how Mike and his girlfriend June Barker (Carolyn Craig) are getting a bit predictable as they have a lot in common. They go to different schools, but see each other on weekends. June is at the Douglas house for dinner and during the conversation, Mike and June finish each others sentences. At school, Mike has to share a book with Amy Bennett as there's only one available in the library. They then go to the shake shop and Mike finds it interesting that she has different likes and priorities than he does. Later, Mike mentions to the family that he might stay at school next weekend and see a play with Amy. Mike wonders if he should just make up an excuse to give June for not coming home for the weekend. Steve thinks Mike should tell June the truth, but Mike doesn't think June would understand. Meanwhile, June tells her father, Harry Barker (Bill Zuckert), that she would like to have one date with Ken Everetts as she finds him interesting. She doesn't know how to tell Mike and Harry says she should just tell the truth. Mike and June try to tell each other that they want to see someone else, but can't bring themselves to do it. Back at school, Mike tries to tell Amy he can't make their date, but isn't able to. Mike sends a letter to Steve asking him to tell June he'll be stuck at school for the weekend. Harry comes by to tell Steve that June won't be home for the weekend and he should let Mike know she'll see him next weekend. Mike is at the play with Amy and he sees June. When he tries to go inside unnoticed, June sees him. They both try to hide from each other, but the two couples wind up sitting next to each other. Later, Mike and June are happy things turned out the way they did and they agree that if they want to see someone else it's OK. Josie Lloyd as Linda Prentiss.
69	33	"Chug and Robbie"	Richard Whorf	William Kelsay	May 17, 1962	0066
It's Robbie's first day at High School and he meets the school's star athlete, Chug Williams (Ryan O'Neal). Later at home, Robbie excitedly tells Mike that his locker is next to Chug's. Mike is not that impressed and calls Chug a show off. The next day at school, Robbie introduces Chug to Gloria Davenport, who Robbie went to grade school with. Chug tells Robbie that he took a few of Robbie's things, but Robbie says that it's OK. Robbie is developing a serious case of hero worship. Meanwhile, Chip is upset because Sudsy is inviting girls to his birthday party. Later, Robbie asks Gloria out and she says she already has a date with Chug. Mike and Robbie get into an argument because Mike says Chug is just being friendly to Robbie because there's something in it for him. Chug is running for president of the Student Body. Robbie learns that Mike is right when Chug asks Robbie to rig the election in his favor. Chip finds a way to get the girls to leave Sudsy's party early. Robbie and the rest of the Student council have finished counting the votes for president. Robbie goes over to Chug's house and meets Mr. Williams (Del Moore). Turns out that Mr. Williams was also quite the athlete when he was younger. He tells Robbie that he was also president of the Student Body when he was in High School. Robbie tells Mr. Williams and Chug that it was close, but Chug didn't win the election. Mr. Williams says that it's OK the Chug didn't win. After his father leaves the room, Chug thanks Robbie for not rigging the election. Note: This episode aired very out of place in the season's timeline with Robbie entering High School and Mike is about to start college. Both had been in those schools for the entire season.
70	34	"Good Influence"	Richard Whorf	John McGreevey	May 24, 1962	0081
Bub is trying to paint a chair, but because of the boys, things keep disappearing on him. Robbie is collecting newspapers for a school salvage drive. Chip is hiding from Freddy Selby, whom he doesn't care for. Bub makes Chip go out and play with Freddy. They wind up at Freddy's house and have milk and cookies. After Chip leaves, Ralph (George D. Wallace) and Claire Selby (Mary Anderson) talk about the trip to the lake they're going to take. Freddy would rather stay home and play with Chip. Meanwhile, Mike and Amy are having a disagreement over what talent means. Amy sees one of the papers that Bub had under the chair he was painting and thinks it's artwork. She would like to show it to her uncle who runs an art gallery. Ralph calls Steve and asks if Chip could go on the trip with them. At first Chip doesn't want to go, but then he tells Steve he will. Amy tells Bub that her uncle liked the painting, has a buyer for it and would like to see more of Bub's work. Up at the lake, Chip sees how much Claire pampers Freddy. Ralph tells Claire he'd like to see Freddy act more like a boy. Bub has now seriously taken up painting. Amy's uncle is not impressed with Bub's new paintings. Chip and Freddy get into a fight when Freddy calls Chip a show off and Chip calls him a chicken. The boys give each other a black eye and become friends. Claire and Ralph are actually happy about the fight.
71	35	"The Hippopotamus Foot"	Richard Whorf	Teleplay by George Tibbles; Story by Richard Whorf	May 31, 1962	0068
Steve gets a special delivery letter asking him to come to the college as Mike may be facing disciplinary action. At the school, Steve speaks with Dean Vincent Talbot (Alexander Lockwood) about a fraternity prank. The Dean explains in a flashback that last Monday night it was raining and the boys were bored. Mike brings into the room an umbrella stand shaped like a hippopotamus foot. The next day the boys bring the foot into the forest. Mike is sent to keep Quinby Lewis (Hank Patterson), the caretaker, busy. Then the boys use the foot to make tracks that lead to the reservoir. Quinby starts to believe that Mike is stalling for some reason. He tells Mike that he's going to take a nap and sends Mike away. Quinby then goes looking around outside and finds the tracks. He brings in some police and they call for Professor Atkins from the museum. One of the police goes around the reservoir and says whatever it is, it didn't come out. Professor Atkins says they are hippopotamus tracks. The Dean then tells Steve how after a few days, the boys spread rumors that the water in town tastes funny. The Mayor orders the dragging of the reservoir. Mike and Tim think the joke has gone far enough, but the other boys don't care. Now there's plans to drain the reservoir. Mike comes up with a plan to make it look as though the Hippo walked out of the reservoir and then out of town. One of the boys, Buzz Talbot, who happens to be the Dean's grandson, confesses to Dean Talbot what they did. The Dean tells Steve how they will be disciplined and asks every parent's approval. Mike Minor as Ray.
72	36	"The Kibitzers"	Richard Whorf	Teleplay by John McGreevey & George Tibbles; Story by John McGreevey	June 7, 1962	0073
Bub is playing cards with Max (Burt Mustin) and Smitty (Lloyd Corrigan). Mike is trying to get a girl named Wendy to notice him. Chip's teacher, Mrs. Bergen, is mad at Chip because he put an ant farm on her desk and the ants escaped. Bub's friends talk about the women Mike and Chip are having problems with and how Steve could use air conditioning in the house. Later, Steve comes home to find a Mr. Hewlitt (Eddie Quillan) and Mr. Crockett measuring things in the house. They give him an estimate for air conditioning. Mike tells Steve that because of something Wendy heard, she is now interested in him. Mrs. Bergen comes to the house and she accuses Bub of sending a blackmail letter to her about Chip. It's another day and Bub and his friends are playing cards again. Robbie comes in and tells Bub he's been nominated for class president. Mrs. Bergen is still giving Chip extra homework because of the ants. And what Wendy heard about Mike turns out to not be true, so she's lost interest in him. Someone is getting involved in a job prospect for Steve. Mrs. Bergen gets another letter and tells Bub if there's a third letter she will call the police. The guy that's running against Robbie for president gives him a black eye because of something that was said over the school PA system. The family is starting to wonder who is behind all of this. Bub's friends come by and Steve and the boys suddenly think they may be involved. Bub thinks they were just trying to help and Steve goes to talk to them. Steve doesn't get through to them, so Bub talks to them. Bill Erwin as Joe Walters.

=== Season 3 (1962–63) ===
No. overall	No. in season	Title	Directed by	Written by	Original release date	Prod. code
73	1	"Weekend in Tokyo"	Gene Reynolds	George Tibbles	September 20, 1962	0101
Robbie is at wrestling class and Freddy Nagata tells him about how his father is a black belt in Judo. Mike comes by and tells Robbie to come home right away as Steve has arranged a last minute trip. Turns out Steve has to go for the weekend to Japan for business and decided to take the boys as well. Mike is not happy about leaving his girlfriend Jane. The family arrive in Tokyo and are met by Mr. Tanaka. Mr. Tanaka brings them to the house where they will be staying. They meet the house keeper and her grand-daughter Kimiko, who speaks English. Mike enjoys spending time with the pretty Kimiko and Mr. Tanaka takes Robbie to a Judo school. That night, Kimiko takes Mike to a dance club for young adults. It's time to go home and Mike is very happy when Kimiko comes to the airport to say goodbye. Back home, Robbie shows off some of the Judo moves he learned on Freddy. Buck Young as Coach.
74	2	"Robbie's Employment Service"	Gene Reynolds	Glenn Wheaton & Mannie Manheim	September 27, 1962	0083
Robbie and his friend Hank need to make money to go on dates. They decide to start a business for home repairs and outdoor chores. They will hire other kids to do the work and take a third of the money. Meanwhile, Mike is off to the Air Force Reserves for the weekend. Robbie and Hank go to see Enoch Lieb (Booth Colman) at the bank's loan department. The boys talk Enoch into giving them a loan despite having no collateral. The business starts off doing well. Chip comes by looking for a job because he wants to buy a new bike. Robbie tells him to start his own business. J.C. Dobbins (Richard Bull), the City License Commissioner, drops by. Dobbins tells the boys they need a license to operate and they pay for it. When Mrs. Edgerton calls to complain about a weed pulling job, Robbie and Hank have to go out and finish the job. Steve is surprised when several young children show up at the Douglas house. It seems Chip started a baby sitting service. Business has hit a slump for Robbie and Hank and they have some bills coming up. Enoch drops by and reminds the boys they have a loan payment due in a few days. Robbie asks Chip to loan him some money. Steve will only let Chip do it if Robbie dissolves his business and goes out and gets a real job.
75	3	"Tramp's First Bite"	Gene Reynolds	Austin Kalish & Elroy Schwartz	October 4, 1962	0091
Tramp gets out of the house and wanders around. The family comes home from shopping and Chip looks for Tramp. John the Policeman comes by and tells them that Tramp is at the animal shelter because he bit a little boy named Alan Edgerton (Tim Matheson). The family doesn't believe Tramp would bite anyone. Bub goes to the shelter and Steve and Mike go to see the Edgertons. Mrs. Edgerton tells Steve that she'll be taking him to court. Tramp will have to be quarantined at home for 2 weeks. Steve and the family consult with Matt Richards (Willard Sage), a lawyer. That night, Chip hides Tramp in the attic. When he gets back to bed, Robbie tells him that trick won't work. Chip and Sudsy dye half of Tramps fur black. Chip tries to tell the family he got rid of Tramp and he has a new dog named Sam. In court, Alan says that Tramp growled at him and when he tried to run away, the dog bit him. There is also testimony from the animal control man, Mr. Davis. During a lunch recess, Matt tells Steve that it doesn't look good for Tramp. Matt suggests making a deal with the Judge (Tyler McVey) to find Tramp a home in the country. Steve reluctantly agrees. When Robbie learns that the leash that was on Tramp didn't belong to Mr. Davis, he tells Steve it must have been Alan's. Matt gets Alan to confess that he put the leash on Tramp because he wanted to take the dog home. And after Alan tried to drag the dog, Tramp bit him. The Judge dismisses the case.
76	4	"Moment of Truth"	Gene Reynolds	Ken Englund	October 11, 1962	0089
Mike nervously asks Sue Ellen Chase to the fraternity dance. Roger had asked her, but he may have to visit his sick mother. If Mike can wait til the last minute, she'd be happy to go with him. At Pop Acton's (Robert Foulk) Hamburger Place, Mike meets Jackie Acton, Pop's daughter. He gets a date with her to see a movie that night. After the movie, Jackie tells Mike how envious she is of girls like Sue Ellen who will go to the dance in fancy clothes. Mike then asks Jackie to go to the dance with him. Later, Mike finds out that Roger did leave, and Sue Ellen can go to the dance with him. Some people are telling Mike he shouldn't take Jackie because she's from the "wrong side of the tracks" and wouldn't fit in. Steve is not happy with what Mike is doing to Jackie. Mike goes to tell Jackie he's going with Sue Ellen. But when Mike sees how excited about the dance Jackie is, he can't break off the date. It's the night of the dance and Mike's tuxedo pants are too big. Jackie comes in to wait for Mike while Bub fixes the pants. Jackie has quite the unusual dress on. Steve wants to find another dress for her and they figure out a way to do it. Jackie now looks beautiful and they have a great time at the dance. Mike Minor as Duke.
77	5	"Daughter for a Day"	Gene Reynolds	Shirley Gordon	October 18, 1962	0092
On a flight back home, Steve runs into an old friend named Elizabeth Hill and her daughter, Jeannie (Suzanne Cupito). It turns out that Elizabeth is giving a lecture in Steve's town. Steve invites them over to the house. Back at home, Bub's lodge is having a picnic, Mike has to go to the Air Force Reserves, Robbie is going horse back riding and Chip is going on a Cub Scout hike. Steve arrives home and learns that everyone but Chip is gone. Chip and Sudsy talk to Jeannie for a while. The boys are fascinated by tales of Jeannie's worldly travels. It's not long before the boys have to leave and Steve finds he'll have to care for Jeannie by himself. Steve finds out from Jeannie that her parents are divorced and she spends 6 months with each of them. The two play house with Steve being the mother. They then go to the Soda Fountain for a while. The family comes home and Steve isn't there. Steve and Jeannie come home from the zoo and she meets the others. The family and Jeannie spend a nice evening together. Elizabeth comes to pick up Jeannie and Jeannie tells Steve that when she plays house again, she'll know what a real family is like. Barbara Lyon as Stewardess.
78	6	"The Ghost Next Door"	Richard Whorf	Teleplay by George Tibbles; Story by Richard Whorf	October 25, 1962	0077
Bub meets Abbie Pearson. She'll be watching her son's house, which is next door to the Douglas house, while he's on a trip. Bub lends her some candles as the power in the Pearson house hasn't been turned back on yet. Meanwhile, Chip and Sudsy try on their costumes for Halloween that night. The boys tell Sudsys mother that they're not afraid of ghosts. Back at the Douglas house, Chip and Sudsy are surprised when they see the door close at the Pearson house, because it's supposed to be empty. It's evening and Bub leaves for a lodge meeting. Chip and Sudsy go out trick-or-treating. While walking through an alley, they are frightened by someone trying to get into their house in the dark. Chip and Sudsy then see someone - or something - carrying a candle in the window of the Pearson house. The boys tell Steve there's a ghost in the house next door. Steve tells them that the house is vacant and they just imagined it. Sudsy spends the night with Chip and has a bad dream. The next morning, Abbie tells Bub she saw Steve and her power will be turned on today. Because the door is open, Chip, Sudsy and Tramp go into the Pearson house. They see Abbie sweeping and run out of the house because they think she's a witch. Chip falls down and Abbie brings him in the house. Sudsy tells Bub, Mike and Robbie that the witch took Chip. They go to the Pearson house and have a nice time with Abbie. Note: This episode was filmed the previous season and held over for broadcast
79	7	"Pretty as a Picture"	Gene Reynolds	George Tibbles	November 1, 1962	0083
Chip and Robbie are doing homework in the kitchen. But Robbie is actually drawing a picture of Cleo Cornell, a girl from school. Clara Gilbert, who clearly likes Bub, comes by to bring him some eggs. Bub finds Clara annoying. Robbie tells Steve that Cleo is a senior at school and doesn't know he exists. Mike tells Robbie that instead of drawing pictures of Cleo, he should take his camera to school and take a photo of her when she's not looking. Robbie has Hank take a picture when he's standing next to Cleo. Steve advises Robbie to forget about Cleo as she is two years older and in high school, that is a world apart. After Hank spreads rumors at school that Robbie and Cleo are going together, Robbie starts showing the picture. Robbie gets a call from Cleo and she asks him over to her house. When Robbie gets to her house, Cleo introduces him to her two older brothers. The brothers ask about the picture and Cleo then tears it up. At school, some people start to question whether Robbie is really going with Cleo. Hank forces Robbie to talk to Cleo. At first she is mad at him. But he tells her the only reason he took the picture was because he thought she was so beautiful. She asks Robbie to have lunch with her and he finds they have nothing in common. Following Mike and Robbie's advice, Bub finds a way to have Clara stop bothering him.
80	8	"What's Cooking?"	Gene Reynolds	John McGreevey	November 8, 1962	0082
Chip overhears Robbie on the phone and thinks that Robbie is trading him for another little brother. But it actually has to do with freshmen at Robbie's school. It will help Robbie meet a girl he's interested in. Chip asks Bub if he has any recipes on a card and Bub says he doesn't write his down. Chip tells Steve that the PTA is having a cooking contest with the kids submitting their mother's favorite recipe. Steve says he has a recipe he used to make. He'll try and remember it and write it down. Bub overhears Chip tell Robbie about the fancy recipe that Steve is going to write down. Bub now is trying some new recipes. Chip says that Steve's recipe was picked as one of the three finalists. It turns out Steve now has to cook his dish at a PTA meeting. Chip makes a bet with Dorine Peters over who will win the contest. Flora McEvoy (Molly Dodd) comes by to take a picture of Steve for a story about him cooking. Bub leaves a note saying he won't be home and Steve should cook dinner. Steve practices the dish he is to cook and it doesn't go well. Bub agrees to cook in Steve's place at the contest. Bub winds up winning first prize with one of his own recipes that he pretended was Steve's. Lois January as Mrs. Hildebrandt. Patsy Garrett as Agnes Peters.
81	9	"Chip's Last Fight"	Gene Reynolds	Joanna Lee	November 15, 1962	0095
On the phone, Robbie is having a hard time asking Nancy to the dance and she tells him she's going with someone else. Mike calls up a girl and shows Robbie how it's done. Everyone has plans for the evening, so Steve wants to get a sitter for Chip. Chip is upset because he thinks he's old enough to be by himself. The next day, Chip tells Sudsy how mad he is that he had to have a sitter. Chip wants to join a neighborhood boys club, but some of the guys say he is too young. Gibbs (Tim Matheson) says Chip has to pass a bravery test. Chip has to fight Casey's little brother and the winner can be the club mascot. Gibbs tells Chip to come back next Saturday. When his brothers turn him down, Bub agrees to show Chip how to fight. Bub notices that Chip has a fever. The Doctor (Bill Quinn) tells Steve that Chips tonsils have to come out. The surgery will be scheduled for Saturday. Chip doesn't tell Steve why, but he doesn't want to do it on Saturday. The family just thinks Chip is afraid, but he's actually worried that Gibbs will think he chickened out. Mrs. Aldrich, Casey's mother, comes by the Douglas house. She tells Steve and Bub that Casey is in a secret club and that Chip was supposed to fight her youngest son Tommy this Saturday. She also says that she put a stop to the fight. Steve now understands why Chip didn't want to have the operation. Steve tells Chip that the fight is called off and he can go to the hospital. Chip is actually relieved. Celeste Yarnall as Ginny Stewart.
82	10	"Steve Gets an A"	Gene Reynolds	True Boardman	November 22, 1962	0087
Robbie has been swamped with homework and has a term paper for history due on Monday. Steve finds out that Robbie has had the assignment for weeks and has just procrastinated. Steve says Robbie has the whole weekend to work on it. But Robbie says he has a chance to go with Janee Holmes (Mimsy Farmer) and her parents to the lake for the weekend. Steve says the paper comes first. Janee comes by and tells Robbie how much she is looking forward to the trip. While he doesn't condone it, Mike shows Robbie a history paper Steve wrote long ago and got an A on. Robbie copies it. Janee and Robbie have a wonderful weekend together. Back at school, Robbie gets his term paper back from teacher Mr. Armstrong. Robbie got an F on the paper and a letter to give to Steve. Robbie gives Steve the letter which asks Steve to meet with Mr. Armstrong. Robbie confesses to copying the paper. Mike tells Steve he was the one that showed Robbie the paper to begin with. Steve goes to see Mr. Armstrong. Though he doesn't remember that far back, it seems Steve copied his paper word for word from an article published in 1874. Steve confesses to Robbie that he copied the paper as well. During the night, Steve gets up and shows Bub something he found in the attic. It turns out Steve was supposed to copy that paper for a typing class, so he didn't cheat. Steve decides to not tell Robbie because of the bonding moment they had.
83	11	"Heat Wave"	Gene Reynolds	Paul David	November 29, 1962	0102
The town is experiencing a record heat wave. Chip and Sudsy are collecting for their Cub Scout paper drive and Chip is having a hard time finding any. Meanwhile, Mike is excited because he got a date with Janie Stempel (Anjanette Comer). She is coming over for dinner and Mike wants everything perfect. The heat is making Bub very irritable. Because Janie lives in a big house with servants, Mike would like everyone to dress for dinner. At dinner, Janie is wondering why the men are wearing jackets in this heat and insists they take them off. Mrs. Fletcher (Templeton Fox) comes by with a truck to pick up what papers Chip has collected. Chip mistakenly gabs some important papers that Steve needs for work. Steve finds the papers missing and panics. If they are not in the mail by midnight that evening, Steve loses a million dollar contract. Robbie, Mike and Janie go to the grocery store parking lot where the papers are being delivered. Milton Gibson (Bartlett Robinson) arrives to meet with Steve about the contract. Steve and Bub try to stall Milton. A Janitor (Billy Beck) tries to stop Robbie, Mike and Janie from rummaging through the papers, but Janie gets him to help. Chip shows up with all the Cub Scouts to help with the search. Milton is losing his patience. Robbie finds Steve's papers and races home. Steve is about to confess to Milton, when Bub hands him the papers.
84	12	"The Beauty Contest"	Gene Reynolds	Walter Black	December 6, 1962	0093
It's almost time for the college beauty pageant. Eddy and Arch want nothing to do with being a judge because of past problems. They pick Mike to do it and he is thrilled. Mike's girlfriend Laurie (Nancy McCarthy) comes by and tells him that she has entered the contest. Mike picks the four finalists and Laurie finds out she's not one of them. Laurie is not happy. Chip and Susdsy look over pictures of the girls in their class because they thought about having a beauty contest. But they don't think any of the girls are pretty. Finalist, Kim Franklin (Jeannine Riley), comes to the house. She invites Mike to a sorority dance that evening. Finalist Jill Wagner (Eilene Janssen) introduces Mike to her rather large friend Dan Palmer. Dan kind of implies that Jill better be the winner. Finalist Mary Ellen Conway, a woman's field hockey player, tells Mike that she plays to win. Mike meets finalist Pat Parnell and she tells him she doesn't care about the contest. She would withdraw if her sorority would let her. Mike now regrets being the judge because he's going to make a lot of enemies. It's the day of the decision and Mike picks Pat. Meanwhile, Chip and Sudsy pick Mary Lou to win their contest. They figure she's big enough to protect them from the other girl's brothers. Mike and Laurie get back together.
85	13	"Doctor in the House"	Gene Reynolds	Teleplay by Danny Simon & George Tibbles; Story by Danny Simon	December 13, 1962	0103
Joe Walters (Russ Conway) asks Steve to oversee a project in Bolivia. Joe does says that the job will involve some physical labor. It's Friday and Joe says Steve has to leave on Monday. Chip has a school project where he has to build a model of the solar system. Meanwhile, Mrs. Gilbert complains to Bub that the boys leave their stuff all over her yard, including Chips roller skates. Steve comes home and when he bends down to pick up one of the skates that Bub dropped, he strains his back. Bub calls Dr. Stasser and finds out he's no longer a general practitioner, he's now an obstetrician. Steve goes to see him anyway. Stasser recommends Steve see Dr. Prince. When Steve finds out from the Door Painter (Sidney Clute) that Prince is starting his practice, Steve leaves. Bub gets a Dr. Waterman (Viola Harris) to come to the house, but Steve won't see her either. Joe comes to the house to go over some things about the trip with Steve. Joe finds out about Steve's injury, but Steve guarantees he'll be fine in a couple days. Chip asks Steve to help him with his school project because Steve's the only one he trusts. Steve tells him there are other capable people. When Mike tells Steve that Dr. Prince is here, Steve says he only wants Dr. Stasser. Steve thinks about what he just told Chip and learns a lesson. Because of Dr. Prince, Steve is able to make his trip. Shirley O'Hara as Nurse.
86	14	"Going Steady"	Gene Reynolds	AJ Carothers	December 20, 1962	0094
At the sophomore sock hop, Robbie asks Linda Francis (Marta Kristen) to go steady with him and she says yes. Paulette Francis (Lola Albright), Linda's mother, calls Steve. She says she doesn't approve of her daughter going steady at her young age. The next day, Paulette shows up at Steve's office. Steve is surprised at how attractive she is. She mentions that she's raising Linda on her own. Paulette would like to come up with a simple way to stop the children from going steady. She and Steve decide to just talk to the children. Steve's talk with Robbie backfires and Robbie thinks Steve condones him being with just one girl. Steve and Paulette go out on a date and talk about how they didn't get through to the kids. Steve and Paulette come home to Paulette's place and find Robbie and Linda sitting on the couch. When Robbie realizes that Steve was on a date he suggests double dating one night. Steve and Paulette spend more time together and Bub runs into them grocery shopping. Paulette has Steve meet her mother, Mrs. Lindsay (Madge Kennedy). Linda comes in saying she saw Robbie holding hands with another girl and she never wants to see him again. Paulette is upset that Robbie would treat Linda that way, but Steve says that they wanted the children to see other people. While they both had fun, Steve and Paulette figure that their time together is over as well.
87	15	"Mother Bub"	Gene Reynolds	Dorothy Cooper Foote	December 27, 1962	0113
Chip and Sudsy each would like a model auto that they see in the toy store. Sudsy's mother won't let him have one. Sudsy tells Chip he's lucky he doesn't have a mother to worry over him all the time. Steve comes home from a business trip. Chip's birthday is coming up soon. Steve and Chip go to the toy store where Chip shows him the auto he would like to have. Steve says he'll have to think about. Sudsy tells Chip that dad's will buy things for their kids when they're sick. Chip then pretends to be sick. Bub tells Steve that Chip is just putting on an act to get something, but Steve doesn't believe it. Steve catches Chip talking to Sudsy on the phone. He asks Chip why he was pretending to be sick. Chip tells him about how Sudsy says father's will give in where mother's won't. Chip says he's glad he doesn't have a mother, but then starts crying. Steve shows Chip pictures of Chip and Bub having good times. Steve gets a call that he'll have to leave on another business trip and he'll miss Chip's birthday. Steve feels bad and buys Chip the car. Bub comes up with an argument against it and says Chip can't have it. Chip agrees to send it back as he feels he also has a mother now. Steve Conte as Delivery Man.
88	16	"Honorable Grandfather"	Gene Reynolds	John McGreevey	January 3, 1963	0112
Angela Telfer wants Robbie to take her to a fancy French restaurant. Because they don't have a reservation, there are no available tables. But then Angela's friend Bradley (Aron Kincaid) shows up and is able to have them join him at his table. Things get a little embarrassing for Robbie. Meanwhile, Steve brings his friend Ray Wong (Benson Fong) to the house. School is out for the rest of the week and Sudsy is out of town, so Chip is miserable. Ray invites Chip to spend a few days at his house. Steve drops by Ray's house to bring Chip some things he forgot. Steve is introduced to Ray's wife Alice Wong (Beulah Quo), Grandfather Wong (Hsi Tseng Tsiang) and Alice's cousin Mai Pah (Judy Dan). Chip is having a good time with the Wong's daughter, Sally. Alice invites Steve and the family to Grandfather's birthday party on Saturday. Robbie is depressed because Bradley is taking Angela to all different kinds of restaurants. Ray tells Robbie to bring Angela to the party on Saturday. At the party, they honor Grandfather Wong and Grandfather Bub with a traditional Chinese dinner. Everyone also gets to see a Chinese New Years parade and Angela is very impressed with Robbie.
89	17	"How to Impress a Woman"	Gene Reynolds	James Allardice & Tom Adair	January 10, 1963	0090
Robbie has Mike help him fix his scratch-built electric guitar and amplifier. Meanwhile, Mike talks to Laurie Burns (Nancy McCarthy) about Grimm's department store doing an add in the college paper about college fashion. Mike wants some the college girls to be models. Susan Hopkins (Diana Millay), from Grimm's, comes by to speak with Mike. Despite being older, Mike is immediately attracted to her. While at lunch, Mike finds out that Susan has a passion for guitar music. To impress Susan, Mike comes up with a plan to fake playing guitar while Robbie runs a phonograph record not far away. Mike goes to Susan's place with the guitar and amp and Robbie is outside the window. Mike leads Susan to believe that he built the guitar. Two of Susan's female friends come by. Mike was only planning on "playing" one song for them. Things go wrong when the ladies ask him to play one more. Wanting to seem older and more responsible to Susan, Mike is thinking of leaving school and getting a job. Steve and Bub go to see Susan. The men think Susan might have designs on Mike. She tells them that despite having some feelings for Mike, it was just a casual relationship. But she's afraid Mike might propose to her and she'll have to say no. Mike arrives and Steve and Bub slip out the back. Susan finds a way to let Mike down gently. Celeste Yarnall as Ginny Stewart.
90	18	"Roman Holiday"	Gene Reynolds	Written by Gail Ingram Clement & Douglas Tibbles; Story by Douglas Tibbles	January 17, 1963	0114
Joe Walters (Russ Conway) comes by the Douglas house. He informs Steve that he has to take a trip to Rome to close a deal. Steve would like Joe to send someone else. Joe really needs Steve to go and as an incentive, the boys can go along. Steve says he'll think it over. Steve tells Bub about the time he was in Rome with the boys mother and there are just too many memories. Something Bub says convinces Steve to make the trip. In Rome, Steve and the boys stay at a house run by housekeeper Sophia. Robbie notices Steve acting strange. Chip goes grocery shopping with Sophia, Robbie does some sight seeing and Mike hopes to meet some Italian women. Robbie tells Steve about a guy he met named Giovanni. Giovanni's mother hasn't left her house in 6 years. She's a widow and doesn't want to see any of the places she used to go to with her husband. Something Robbie says makes Steve decide to visit some of the places he was at with the boys mother. Mike runs into Steve at a restaurant and Mike is with a girl he thinks is Italian but turns out to be American. The next day the family and friends takes a picture at a place Steve and the boys mother visited.
91	19	"Flashback"	Gene Reynolds	Dorothy Cooper Foote	January 24, 1963	0116
Steve is waiting at a bus stop when 16 year old Rebecca Holly (Joyce Bulifant) and her Aunt Martha (Meg Wyllie) come in. Rebecca reminds Steve of someone he knew long ago. Back at home, Steve tells Robbie and Chip about Rebecca and how she was a sweet old fashioned girl. Robbie introduces Corky to Steve. She is a very wild and outgoing girl. Steve suddenly remembers who Rebecca reminded him of, a girl named Sarah Belle Thompson (Joyce Bulifant). Steve takes a walk with Bub and reminisces about the old days. Flashback to a young Steve asking Sarah Belle to a movie. Steve and Bub walk to a fish pond. Flashback to after the movie, Steve and Sarah Belle are by a fish pond where people throw in pennies. Steve tries to kiss Sarah Belle, but she pushes him into the pond. Steve and Bub run into Rebecca, who is staying with another Aunt nearby. The next day, Bub suggests to Robbie that to make Steve happy, he should go out once with Rebecca. Robbie reluctantly agrees. Before the date, Steve tells Robbie again what a nice old fashioned girl she is. Rebecca turns out to be anything but old fashioned. She's very aggressive and forward and Robbie is a little uneasy. At the pond, she tries to kiss Robbie and he falls in. As Robbie runs off, Rebecca says she had a nice evening. Not wanting to disillusion Steve, Robbie does not tell him how Rebecca really was.
92	20	"The Dream Book"	Gene Reynolds	Ernest Chambers	January 31, 1963	0106
Larry Travers (George Ives), one of Steve's coworkers, asks Steve to join his musical group. Steve turns him down, but Larry says he'll check with Steve the next day. When he gets home, Steve tells Bub about Larry. That night, Steve has a bad dream where he's being chased by a man with a long white beard who looks like Larry and is carrying a trumpet. Steve winds up waking the boys. Mike says that maybe they should try and decipher the dream, but Steve falls asleep. The next morning, Bub shows Mike his book about dreams that was written by a gypsy. Mike thinks it's just a bunch of superstition. Mike describes a dream he recently had and Bub tells him the books interpretation of it. Mike thinks the interpretation is silly. Mike talks to Professor Engel (Werner Klemperer ) about Steve's dream. Mike thinks the dream means that Steve is afraid of getting old. Wanting to make Steve feel young, Mike and a couple friends talk him into playing basketball with them. They then invite him to a party, but Steve turns them down. Mike decides to have the party at the Douglas house. They have one of the girls, Polly, ask Steve to play his saxophone. Polly and the other girls actually enjoy Steve's playing. Something else happens that has Bub's interpretation of Mike's dream come true. The next day, Steve thanks Mike for trying to make him feel young, but it isn't necessary.
93	21	"Big Chief Bub"	Gene Reynolds	Teleplay by Paul Crabtree & Gail Ingram Clement; Story by Paul Crabtree	February 7, 1963	0108
Den Mother Mrs. Thorndyke (Marge Redmond) has set up a picnic lunch for her boy-scout group. While she's back in the house, two older boys come by, steal the cupcakes and knock over the pitcher of juice. Mrs. Thorndyke informs her group that this will be her last time as Den Mother. Her husband's job is transferring him, so she and her scout son, Benjy, will be moving away. The boys say that none of their mother's are available to fill in. Chip volunteers Bub to be Den Mother. Later, Chip tells Steve that he volunteered Bub without asking him first. That night the family pampers Bub and then Chip tells him what he did. Bub says he doesn't want to be Den Mother. Steve talks Bub into it. At his first scout meeting, Bub asks the boys why there's white paint on their uniforms. They say that the older boys, Larson and Phil, have been picking on them. Bub tells them they shouldn't run from bullys. Bub attends a meeting with the other Den Mothers. One mother complains that Bub is too rough on his group, making them march and teaching them about fighting. Chip tells Steve that some of the boys are quitting because of Bub. The scouts are having a bake sale. When Larson and Phil come by and try and steal two cakes, Bub pushes their faces into the cakes. One of the mothers witnesses this, doesn't approve of what Bub did and she takes the scouts away. Chip is proud of what Bub did. That night, the mother comes by with the scout group and admits that Bub did the right thing. Mercedes Shirley as Mrs. Kaye. Templeton Fox as Mrs. Olson.
94	22	"The Clunky Kid"	Gene Reynolds	Story by : Arnold Peyser & Lois Peyser; Teleplay by : John McGreevey & Arnold Peyser & Lois Peyser	February 14, 1963	0097
Robbie, Hank and Joan (Bernadette Withers) are at an automobile junk yard. Joan is upset because she and Hank were supposed to be on a date and she leaves. Later, Robbie apologizes to Joan and says the afternoon was all his fault. He tells her she shouldn't stay mad at Hank. Joan tells him she's no longer interested in Hank. She's tells Robbie she's glad he came over and this could be the start of something. Meanwhile, Chip wants Sudsy to come out and play. But Sudsy is spending time with his new friend Barry and Chip is odd man out. That night, Steve can sense something is wrong with Chip. He is told that Chip is upset because Sudsy is only playing with new kid Barry. Steve wants everyone to spend more time with Chip to try and cheer him up. The next day Steve takes Chip to the Air Base with him. Robbie tells Hank that while he likes Joan, he doesn't want to go out with her because she's Hank's girl. Hank wants Robbie to go out on the date because she'll eventually come back to him. Hoping to upset Joan, Robbie brings Chip on the date. The plan backfires when Joan thinks it's sweet. The next day the family has plans to go to the ballgame. Sudsy comes by and wants to play with Chip, but Chip says he's busy. Bub learns from Mrs. Pfeiffer that Chip gave Sudsy the brush off. The family comes up with a plan to make Chip want to play with Sudsy again. Robbie and Hank come up with a plan to have Joan get back with Hank. It works, but not perfectly. Hari Rhodes as Guard.
95	23	"Caged Fury"	Gene Reynolds	Story by : Austin Kalish & Elroy Schwartz; Teleplay by : Austin Kalish & Elroy Schwartz & George Tibbles	February 21, 1963	0115
Coach Wade is not happy with the wrestling team's practice. Mr. Dunham (Ivan Bonar) tells the Coach that all the boys on the team need to improve their math grades or they will flunk. Meanwhile, Bub is telling Chip about the fishing trip he's going on with his friend Jerry to catch a special trout named Old Roy. In the locker room, one of the boys suggests that Robbie's father tutor them as he is an aeronautical engineer. Robbie asks Bub if it's OK for the wrestling team to come to the house. Robbie figures that Steve will see how poorly the team is in math and volunteer to help. The team shows up and Steve isn't home yet. One of the boys, Lloyd, complains about how hot he is. Bub calls Dr. Miller (Bill Quinn), who comes by and after examining Lloyd, says he has diphtheria. Dr. Miller says the whole house has to be quarantined. Bub is upset because now he can't go fishing. Steve and Mike come home, learn about the quarantine and go to a hotel. The next morning, Bub just mopes about the house. Chip is worried about Bub because he doesn't do anything when the guys boss him around. Bub receives a postcard saying that Jerry caught Old Roy. Chip and Robbie are happy because Bub now starts yelling and ordering the boys to do things. Steve winds up tutoring the boys from outside, calling out to Robbie at the window his instructions, and letting his son relay them to the guys inside. It's been five days and nerves are getting frayed. Steve throws the boys a party with girls dancing outside. Dr. Miller comes by and the quarantine is over. Even though Old Roy has been caught, Bub goes on his fishing trip. Heather North as Sally.
96	24	"Make Way for Yesterday"	Gene Reynolds	Teleplay by John McGreevey; Story by Ron Alexander	February 28, 1963	0119
Chip is trying to teach Tramp to fetch but is having no luck. Robbie, Hank and Joan Marshall get together to decide what kind of booth their current events club should have at the school carnival. Some of the other clubs will have booths featuring atom smashing, space capsules and computers. Robbie gets upset when Joan starts laughing at something Bub did earlier. He says that no one laughs at his grandfather. Robbie stops the meeting and tells them that he's off the committee. Later, Joan comes back to the Douglas house and talks with Bub and Steve. She apologizes to Robbie and he agrees to be on the committee again. Bub comes up with the idea to have an old fashioned dunking machine booth at the carnival. Robbie brings up the dunking machine to the current events club members. At first they are against the idea, but then they reluctantly agree to it. Robbie and Steve start building the machine. It's the day of the carnival. Bub is doing his best as a carnival barker but no one is going to the dunking machine booth. After Bub throws a ball and dunks Robbie a crowd forms around the booth. The dunking booth winds up taking in quite a bit of money. Pamela Austin as Susie. Stephen Lodge as Rango Milford.
97	25	"Robbie Wins His Letter"	Gene Reynolds	Glenn Wheaton & Mannie Manheim	March 7, 1963	0100
Science teacher Mr. Armstrong tells his class that he's convinced the school board to give out a school sweater award for outstanding scholar. The two candidates are Robbie Douglas and Mildred Harper. Right away a couple of the football players give Robbie a hard time. Later that day, Steve sees an article in the paper about the award and it lists Robbie's and Mildred's names. Steve is very proud, but Robbie is not happy. Hank comes by the house and tells Robbie and the family he won't be coming around for a while. His father saw the article and he wants Hank to study more and bring his grades up. Robbie goes to his girlfriend Betty's (Brooke Bundy) house. She can't go on anymore dates until her grades get better. Robbie tells Steve he needs to find a way to lose the award. Steve says that it would be an honor to win and it's a shame the other kids can't see that. In science class, Robbie answers a question wrong intentionally. Mildred talks to her psychiatrist mother, Dr. Harper (June Dayton), about Robbie. Mildred thinks her and Robbie have more in common and can't understand why he is interested in Betty. Mildred gets all made up and goes to talk to Robbie. She tells him he should try and win the award. Robbie starts to notice how pretty Mildred now is. It's time to present the award and Mr. Armstrong introduces General Jimmy Stewart. Jimmy tells the students how important a good education is and how vital to the country it is. Jimmy then presents the award, a school Letterman sweater, to Robbie. All the students, even the ones that gave Robbie a hard time, stand up and cheer.
98	26	"High on the Hog"	Gene Reynolds	Glenn Wheaton & Mannie Manheim	March 14, 1963	0109
Chip asks Bub if he can have a new puppy and Bub says no more animals in the house. Robbie and Hank complain about being broke. Their farm friend George (Jimmy Hawkins) offers them a pig to raise. They'll be partners on the profits when they sell the pig. Despite Bub being against it, Steve allows Robbie to keep the pig, but he has to take care of it. Robbie and Hank build a pen for the pig in the back yard and they name it Hamlet. The guys have to find something for Hamlet to eat when Bub refuses to give them anything from the kitchen. That evening a Police Officer comes by and tells Steve there's been a complaint about the pig making noise. Steve finds out that Robbie was gone all day and the pig was making noise because it wasn't fed. Steve is upset that Robbie isn't taking better care of Hamlet. Hank tells Robbie that the pig is taking up too much of his time and he wants out of the partnership. It's been a while now and the pig is much bigger and doing well. Chip is upset when he learns Hamlet is to be sold for food. Steve has a long talk with Chip and gets him to understand. Robbie starts to feel bad and asks George to just keep Hamlet on the farm and not sell him. George decides to enter Hamlet in a local livestock show. The Judge (Dub Taylor) gives Robbie a special award for raising a pig the hard way, in the city.
99	27	"First Things First"	Gene Reynolds	John McGreevey	March 28, 1963	0111
Steve and Chip visit the Air Force base to see Mike. Sgt. McCullum (Rayford Barnes) tells them he didn't show up. They had to abort a mission because the crew needed his help with a mechanical failure. Meanwhile, Robbie wishes he were a little older in order to impress Ingrid. They are the same age, but Robbie says girl's like older men. Mike tells Steve that he wasn't scheduled to go to the base today, it was purely voluntary. The next week, Mike apologizes to McCullum for not volunteering the week before. Mike says he'll volunteer for the next mission and nothing will stop him from being there. Mike's friend, Burt, tells him that Melissa Cartwright (Donna Corcoran) asked about Mike. Burt thinks she wants to invite Mike to the Junior Guilds Ball. Mike tells Steve that the best looking girl at school is interested in him and he won two tickets to a baseball game. Mike realizes that the game is on the day he's to be at the base and gives the tickets to Steve. Mike gets together with Melissa and she does ask him to the Ball. It's also on the day he is to be at the base, but Mike doesn't say anything. Robbie shows Bub the fake mustache he's wearing. Mike sets up going to the drag races with his friend Archie, but then finds out it's during the weekend he is to be at the base. Mike talks to Steve about maybe not going to the base for the next mission. Steve tells him he will have to make that decision. Mike winds up going to the air base and he's able to set up a date with Melissa for the next weekend. Ingrid invites Robbie to a party where everyone has to dress up as little kids. Mike Minor as Fetterman. James Victor as Pete Abbott.
100	28	"Bub's Butler"	Gene Reynolds	Douglas Tibbles	April 4, 1963	0118
Bub has been entering a lot of contests. Bub and the boys are watching the Mother Barstow's Famous Foods contest on TV. After the first and second prize winners are announced and Bub didn't win, he turns off the TV. Robbie is talking to Maureen on the phone. Her parents were watching the same show and said that Bub won fourth prize. The prize will be delivered the next morning. The next morning Charles Augustus Caesar Bevins (John Williams) arrives. He tells Bub that he is to be Bub's butler for the next two weeks. At first Bub enjoys being pampered, but then he finds out he'll still have to do the cooking. It's 2 o'clock in the morning and Bub finds Charles having tea in the kitchen. Charles tells Bub about Angela, a woman he cares for back in England. Charles is in the States to earn enough money as Angela won't consider marriage without security. Charles is competing with another guy named Monty and the first to get enough money wins Angela. The next day Charles receives a cablegram, but he won't tell Bub what it says. For the next couple days Charles is in a bad mood. That night the family can't find Tramp. Charles says he put the dog in an animal shelter as he is allergic to him. Steve goes to talk with Charles to find out what's going on. Charles would like to be fired. Bub finds out that Monty is returning to England with enough money. Charles wants to go back but if he quits, he loses his salary. If he's fired, Charles still gets the money. Charles receives another cablegram from Angela saying Monty didn't have enough money and she's waiting for him. Now realizing that money is too important to Angela, Charles sends her a cablegram saying "Get Lost". Paul Kent as Announcer.
101	29	"Francesca"	Gene Reynolds	Teleplay by Ernest Chambers & Gail Ingram Clement; Story by Ernest Chambers	April 11, 1963	0120
Steve and Bub will be out of the house for the day. Chip and Sudsy are wondering what Tramp is barking at. It turns out to be a wild bird that must be sick as Chip can pick it up. Robbie brings the bird into the house and puts it in a shoe-box. Meanwhile, a woman enters the Douglas house and starts eating some food Bub left on the kitchen table. She hears Robbie coming and as she's about to leave, she faints. Dr. Nugent (Maurice Manson) comes by and tells Robbie that she must have hit her head when she fainted but he thinks she'll be OK. The Doctor thinks she fainted from hunger. The woman comes to and Dr. Nugent tells her she needs rest and some food. Chip and Sudsy show the woman their wild bird. As Robbie is feeding her soup, she says she's from Italy and her name is Francesca Powley. Mike comes home and is thinking about calling the police on Francesca. She tells him her father is a Count back in Milan. She is a Countess and her father sent her to America to marry the son of a friend of his. The son was ugly and treated her cruelly, so she ran away before the wedding. Someone told her that there were only men in this house, so she thought she could cook for them. Mike's not sure he believes her story and finds a phone number in her purse. He learns from her sister that Francesca's running away from a job as a house maid and her sponsor died. She is supposed to be sent out of the country. Mike says they should call the immigration authorities. Francesca says she wants to stay in America. Mike makes another call and finds out that all she has to do is find another sponsor. Steve and Bub come home and the boys tell them about Francesca. When they go to see her, she's gone.
102	30	"The Rug"	Gene Reynolds	Gail Ingram Clement	April 18, 1963	0086
Robbie wants a copy of a picture of Mike in his uniform. Robbie has a girl pen pal that is older and wants to pass off Mike as himself. Chip needs a note for school because of a book he lost. Robbie and Mike are mad at Chip for messing with their things. After Steve finds out that Chip did something to his pen, he tells Chip that he has to respect other peoples property. Steve puts Chip on probation and if he touches one more thing that belongs to someone else, he will be severely punished. Meanwhile, Bub is giving several items from the attic to Miss Davis (Sarah Selby) for a rummage sale. Miss Davis sees a tiger skin rug that she thinks someone will like. Bub tells her he'll put all the stuff in a closet until she is ready to pick them up. Chip and Sudsy see the rug in the closet and Sudsy thinks it's fake. Chip at first doesn't want to touch it because of what Steve said, but then he pulls it out to show Sudsy. The boys leave the rug in the living room. Robbie receives a picture from his pen pal and she is beautiful. Mike says that maybe she sent a picture of someone else the way Robbie did. A Truckman comes by to pick up the rummage sale stuff and Bub finds the rug on the floor. Chip comes home and panics when he sees the rug is gone. Sudsy tells Chip there a tiger skin rug at the rummage sale. Chip goes there and asks the Saleswoman (Irene Tedrow) if he could buy it, but he doesn't have enough money. Chip tells Robbie and Mike that they probably took the rug to get him in trouble. The two go and buy the rug to help Chip. Robbie gets a letter from his pen pal. She says her family will be coming to the states and the picture she sent was of her older sister. Turns out his pen pal is actually younger than him. Steve asks Mike and Robbie how the rug got back to the house. Chip finds out what his brothers did to help him. Something later backfires when Robbie thinks he's going to meet his pen pal. Lisa Seagram as Maria.
103	31	"The System"	Gene Reynolds	Tim Considine & John Considine	April 25, 1963	0117
There's going to be a Sadie Hawkins dance at Robbie's school and a lot of girls are calling Robbie, so he doesn't know which girl's invitation he will accept. Meanwhile, Chip is practicing knot tying for Cub Scouts. Mike suggests using a system he learned in his psychology class using indirect questioning to find the right girl for Robbie. He would test each girl without them knowing they are being tested. Mike will be helping Robbie and he could use the subject for his psychology term paper. Robbie will have to avoid running into any of the girls while at school. The first girl Mike talks to asks more questions than he does. Robbie overhears Janie (Pamela Austin) and Sally talking about him. It turns out several of the girls who called him were actually calling to get other boys' phone numbers. Robbie is upset because all the girls are getting dates while he was waiting for Mike to finish the test. He'll probably wind up with no one. Mike finishes analyzing his data and says that Robbie should go with Audrey Kent (Linda Marshall). Robbie is not happy with the selection as Audrey is kind of plain looking. It's the night of the dance and when Robbie picks up Audrey, she is beautiful. Robbie and Audrey have a wonderful time together. Mike goes out with Judy (Charlotte Stewart), one of the girls that he tested because she seemed right for him. He has a miserable time on the date. Apparently Mike's system isn't fool proof. During Cub Scouts, Sudsy ties up Chip and Steve can't get the knot untied. Templeton Fox as Mrs. Curtis. Note: The characters Mike (Tim Considine) and Judy (Charlotte Stewart) were married in real life, 2 1/2 years after this episode aired. They were married from October 1965 - May 1969.
104	32	"Let's Take Stock"	Gene Reynolds	Larry Markes & Michael Morris	May 2, 1963	0105
Because of something that Steve doodled on some plans, Harvey Reynolds (Raymond Bailey) thinks Steve's into the stock market. Steve says that it's just a family game they're playing. Meanwhile, Robbie is at a stock brokers office and gets upset when he sees a stock of his going down. Chip tells Sudsy that he's doing market research to see the things kids like and then he'll by stock in that product. At school, Mike tells Duke about a stock he's interested in. Dick Pomeroy (Robert Brubaker), from the broker's office, calls Steve and tells him he's worried about Robbie. Steve tells Dick that it's a school economics project. Each student gets fictional money to see if they can increase their investment. Steve says that the rest of the family is participating because he thinks it's a good way for them to learn about investing. Steve is going over the plans with Harvey and Mr. Johnson (John Alvin), when he gets a call from Bub. Bub mentions some of the boys stocks and Harvey is interested. Steve says it's just a project, but Harvey doesn't believe him. Harvey buys one of the stocks that he heard Steve mention. Robbie complains to Steve that a lot of the guys are making money buying and selling their stocks. Steve says that we're not traders, we're investors. Harry gets upset when he hears the stock he bought is going way down. Chip winds up making the most money on his investments. Steve gets a $2000 bonus and suggests putting a down payment on a cabin by the lake. The boys think he should buy some stock with it.
105	33	"Total Recall"	Gene Reynolds	Story by : Elon Packard & Stanley Davis; Teleplay by : Elon Packard & Stanley Davis and George Tibbles	May 9, 1963	0107
Chip and Sudsy show off the fishing poles they made. Steve reads in the paper that Skipper Thompson (Rusty Lane), an old baseball manager, is coming to town to get an award from the high school. Bub and Skipper went to high school together. During the day, Bub becomes very irritable and snaps at everyone. Mike tells Steve that he thinks Bub is upset because of Skipper. Mike thinks Bub should talk to Professor Engle. Days go by and Bub is still upset. Mike and Robbie find Bub repeating "Ja-Da" in his sleep and they can't figure out what it means. Professor Engle comes by the house and Mike introduces him to Bub. It doesn't take long for Engle to realize Bub hates Skipper. Engle suggests the family surprise Bub and invite Skipper to the house. Skipper comes by the house with his wife Ruthie (Betty Bronson). Ruthie asks Bub if he remembers when they had a crush on each other in high school. Bub even remembers the first song they danced to and Bub sings Ja-Da. Steve tells Mike that Skipper obviously stole Bub's girl and that's what's been making Bub irritable. Skipper is clearly not thrilled about Bub and Ruthie reminiscing. Skipper mentions that he has to go get his award and he and Ruthie leave. Later, something Steve and Robbie say makes Bub realize he has to move on from Ruthie.
106	34	"When I Was Your Age"	Gene Reynolds	Ernest Chambers	May 16, 1963	0084
Steve tells Bub that he's concerned about a meeting he's to have with Thorne Masterson (Edward Platt), the President of Union Aircraft. Steve is supposed to sell him on a very important contract. Later, Mike doesn't want to walk 5 blocks to a girl's house. Bub tells Mike he used to walk 2 miles to school. He tells the boys they are lazy compared to the boys of his generation. They decide to surprise Bub by doing some chores around the house while he's at the dentist. Meanwhile, Thorne tells his assistant Jensen that he's surprised they're sending an engineer to negotiate the contract and not someone more important. Steve had left the phone number of where he'll be having the meeting in case of an emergency. Each son calls Steve and interrupts his meeting with questions that he can't help with. Bub comes home and finds that everything the boys tried to help with went wrong. He calls Steve and tells him the boys have to stop trying to help him. Despite all the interruptions, Steve's meeting went well. Thorne tells Jensen that he was wrong and Steve was just the kind of guy he liked working with. Thorne also thought that all those calls were from Steve's office and they can't get along without him.
107	35	"Chip's World"	Gene Reynolds	Dorothy Cooper Foote	May 23, 1963	0096
Despite it being Saturday, Steve has to go to work. Steve tells Bub that Robert Johnson (John Alvin) will be coming by to pick up an envelope. Bub has something to do, so he gives the envelope to Mike. Mike and Robbie have to leave, so Chip gets stuck staying at home to wait for Robert. Chip is in the front yard and sees little girl Sandy Riley. A guy on a bicycle is heading right for Sandy and Chip pulls her out of the way. Chip decides to take Sandy home. Meanwhile at work, Steve gives a lecture about sending a rocket to the moon. It's quite a ways to Sandy's house and Sudsy joins Chip. A man in a car asks Chip for directions. Chip doesn't know it, but that man is Mr. Johnson. Sandy is asleep and the boys try to get her into her backyard without Mrs. Riley (Mercedes Shirley) seeing. Somehow Chip gets back to the house before Mr. Johnson shows up. When he does arrive, the two recognize each other from earlier. Gil Perkins as Painter. Bill Idelson as Clerk.
108	36	"Evening with a Star"	Gene Reynolds	Douglas Tibbles	May 30, 1963	0104
Chip complains that he doesn't have hand brakes on his bike. Mike reads in the paper that a guy won a raffle and got a date with movie star Kim Novak. Bub shows Chip a scrapbook from when he was a vaudevillian star. Chip tells Sudsy that he's going to sell raffle tickets for a night with a star to earn money for the hand brakes. Sudsy has a printing press and makes the tickets for Chip. When Sudsy asks who the star is, Chip says it's a surprise. Sudsy asks his father (Olan Soule) if it's OK that he print a bunch of extra tickets for himself and put them in Chips bowl. Mr. Pfeiffer isn't paying attention and says it's OK. Chip has sold a lot of tickets. Chip finally reveals to his brothers and Bub that Bub is the big star. Bub doesn't mind being the star. It's time to pull the winning ticket and the name is Sudsy. Sudsy is not happy when he finds out Bub is the star. At first Bub is not thrilled with the idea of spending time with Sudsy, but he agrees to it. Bub is out with Sudsy and it's not going too well. Hoping to help, Steve calls Mooney (J. Pat O'Malley), the owner of the place Bub and Sudsy are at. Mooney finds a way to make Bub look like a big star.
109	37	"The Date Bureau"	Gene Reynolds	John McGreevey	June 6, 1963	0110
Robbie and Marcia (Davey Davison) are not having a good time on their blind date. The next day, Chip and Sudsy are looking around the Douglas house for fire hazards. If Chip finds enough, he could become a junior fire marshal. Robbie complains that there has to be an easier way to find the right girl. Robbie and Hank decide to start a date bureau in the Douglas house. They start gathering information from their classmates. Marcia comes by to fill out a card and then hangs around. Robbie and Hank learn that no one wants to go out with Marcia. Because they guaranteed her a date, Robbie takes Marcia out again. The date doesn't go any better than their last one. Marcia asks Robbie to take her card out of the bureau's files. When he takes her home, Robbie discovers they have a common interest in cars. Chip becomes a junior fire marshal and tries to run a fire drill at home.
110	38	"Bub's Sacrifice"	Gene Reynolds	Howard Leeds	June 13, 1963	0088
Bub accidentally gets neighbor old lady Ethel Carlson mad at him. Robbie is practicing dancing for the junior prom and Bub shows him a dance move. Steve comes home and gives Bub a ticket to the fighting match. Pretty Claudia Martin comes to the door looking for her Aunt Ethel. Robbie tells her Ethel lives next door. Later, Robbie runs into Claudia again and learns she's visiting her Aunt for the weekend. Robbie asks her to the prom that evening, but she already has a blind date with a Bill Mason. Bill is into body building and Bub goes to see him at the gym. Bub talks Bill into taking his ticket to the fight and skipping the prom. Robbie calls Claudia, but because Bill cancelled the date, she promised to go to the movies with her Aunt. Steve tricks Bub into asking Ethel to the movies so Claudia can go to the dance. Things don't work out the way Bub hoped. But in the end, Ethel agrees to go out with Bub. Robbie and Claudia change their minds about the prom and go to a movie. Robbie tells Mike what a great time he had with Claudia.
111	39	"Found Money"	Richard Whorf	Gail Ingram Clement	June 20, 1963	0078
Chip is going to a dance and Bub reminisces about teaching Chip to dance when he was younger. He then recalls when everyone was trying to find a missing stamp that was worth a lot of money. Then there's the time Chip went to the grand opening of a new store to get a free lollipop. The Store Owner (Jess Kirkpatrick) tells Chip he's all out of lollipops. Chip goes outside and finds a bunch of coins on some newspapers that people put there to pay for them. Chip brings them back into the store. Not knowing where Chip got them from, a lady customer tells him he can keep the money. Chip tells Sudsy about it and when they go back to the store, there's more money. Chip buys a baseball with the money, but later finds out the money was to pay for the newspapers. He leaves the baseball on the papers. Meanwhile, the stamp was found but then gets lost again. Chip is afraid he'll get into a lot of trouble for taking the money. A Policeman (Dick Winslow), who is there to buy the stamp from Bub, comes to the door. Chip thinks he's there to arrest him. Chip tells Mike what he did and the two go and explain things to the Store Owner. The Owner understands and Mike pays him back. Thanks to Chip, the stamp is found. Burt Mustin as Elderly Man. Owen Bush as Policeman. Note: This season 3 finale is mostly made up of footage from an unaired season 1 episode represented as a flashback.

=== Season 4 (1963–64) ===
No. overall	No. in season	Title	Directed by	Written by	Original release date	Prod. code
112	1	"Almost the Sound of Music"	Gene Reynolds	Ed James & Seaman Jacobs	September 19, 1963	0126
Bub and Chip are watching Robbie on a teen dance show on TV. The host, Bunny Baxter, reminds viewers that there is one week left to enter a song writing contest. The girl Robbie is with, Nancy, thinks he should write a song. Robbie finishes writing a song and wants to tape record it. Bub thinks the family should do the backing vocals. It takes some time, but Robbie finally gets a good recording of his song. Robbie tells the family that he is 1 of 4 finalists and will perform the song on the TV show. He wants the family to go along and sing. Steve doesn't want to do it, but then reluctantly agrees. Backstage at the show, Robbie introduces another finalist, Dennis Rhinehart (Allan Hunt), to Steve. Dennis' father is August Rhinehart (Paul Birch) of Rhinehart Aviation, a man Steve is to have a meeting with. Steve now doesn't want to perform because he's afraid August will see him on TV. During the song, Steve keeps trying to hide in the background, but the stagehands stop him. Robbie's song wins the contest. Steve meets with August and he says Steve looked silly on the show. But, August is happy that his son didn't win because he didn't want Dennis to be a song writer.
113	2	"Scotch Broth"	Gene Reynolds	George Tibbles	September 26, 1963	0121
Steve takes the family to Scotland after he learns he's inherited a castle. In the town there are many in the Douglas clan that are not happy about Steve getting the castle and them being cut off. When the family arrives in town, Steve goes into a local pub. Some of the clan are there and at first they think Steve is Laird Douglas (Fred MacMurray), because they look identical. But they soon realize Steve is American. The family is given a lousy room in the pub. The next day, Mike and Robbie meet two girls their age and have a nice conversation. Their brother doesn't want them talking to Mike and Robbie and chases the girls away. Chip meets a boy with the same name as his, Richard Douglas. His father comes by and wants Richard to go home. At the bar, Bub gets into a fight with one of the clan and Steve has to drag Bub outside. Steve thinks the people will treat them better if they dress likes Scots, but that doesn't work. Mike figures out that Steve owns the pub as the sign outside says "The Castle". Some of the men apologize to Steve for treating the family so poorly. Steve says he doesn't want the pub and that the clan can have it. Steve finally meets Laird Douglas and both claim to not see a resemblance. The Laird gets upset when Steve says he doesn't want the inheritance. Steve finds a loophole in the will that prevents him from keeping the pub. John McLiam as Douglas. William O'Connell as Archibald. Ronald Long as Bruce MacKenzie.
114	3	"Didya Ever Have One of Those Days?"	Gene Reynolds	Milt Rosen & Danny Simon	October 3, 1963	0135
Bub tells Mike that Steve's going to have a bad day as he cut himself shaving and then he burned his finger. Now he can't get the car started. Steve finally starts the car then knocks over the garbage cans as he's driving off. At work, Mr. Gordon (Addison Richards) asks Joe Walters (Russ Conway) where Steve is as he has a meeting with A. J. Putman. Steve finally arrives and tells Joe he ran out of gas. Then it turns out that Steve left the plans he was to show Putman at home. Mike brings the plans and later Steve spills ink on his suit. A couple more bad things happen and Steve asks Joe to drive him home. Later, things get complicated when Chip takes a phone message from Mr. Gordon that Steve is to meet Mr. Putman at 7:30 that evening. Steve's wallet is in the suit with ink on it at the cleaners. Now there's a mad scramble to get money so Steve can pay for the Putman's at the restaurant. Steve is late in getting to the restaurant because of the money problem. Steve has an embarrassing moment while dancing with Mrs. Putman. Back at home, Steve has one more thing go wrong to finish his day. Bill Idelson as Mr. Higgins. Barbara Lyon as Hat Check Girl.
115	4	"Dear Robbie"	Gene Reynolds	Bob Fisher & Arthur Marx	October 10, 1963	0141
Robbie becomes the writer of an advice column for the school paper. Bub doesn't think Robbie should be giving out advice, but Steve thinks it's all harmless. Steve reads one of the columns where a girl says she loves an older man and wants to marry him right away. Her parents don't approve. Robbie says that you may never get another chance at love and she should elope. Steve gets a call from Miss Whitmore (Mary Carver), Robbie's journalism teacher, and she's concerned about Robbie's column. The girl who wrote the letter to the column calls and Steve says he would like to talk to her. She agrees to meet him at the malt shop. Once there, Joanie Baker (Brenda Scott) only tells Steve her first name. Joanie's friend, Mary Lou, comes by and thinks Steve is the older man. Mary Lou tells Mr. (Arthur Peterson) and Mrs. Baker (Elizabeth Harrower) that Steve is the man Joanie wants to marry. Steve brings Joanie home and Mr. Baker confronts him. Steve says that he's not the older man and he believes he's convinced Joanie not to elope. Joanie talks to Robbie and tells him how much she likes Steve. Joanie now follows Steve everywhere. 19 year old John Carter (Jimmy Hawkins) comes to Steve's office and tells him he's the older man who was to elope with Joanie. Steve makes John promise to not marry Joanie without her parents permission. Steve then comes up with a plan to get John and Joanie back together.
116	5	"A Car of His Own"	Gene Reynolds	Steve McNeil	October 17, 1963	0138
Robbie asks Mary Lou (Brooke Bundy) to go steady, but she's not sure. Jimmy (Tommy Cole) drives up in a flashy car and offers Mary Lou a ride home which she accepts. Robbie is depressed because he can't afford a car. After dinner, Bub, Chip and Mike bring Robbie to the garage. Mike is going to get another car so Robbie can have his old one. The three are surprised when Robbie doesn't seem that excited. Mike talks to Robbie and Robbie says that while he appreciates what Mike did, he wants a car of his own. So it will really be his, Robbie offers to buy Mike's car. Robbie then trades the car for a beat up one that doesn't even run. Steve comes home from a trip and Bub tells him what Robbie did. Robbie goes around and gets parts for the car on credit. Bub tells Steve he's worried about how in debt Robbie's getting. Robbie finally finishes fixing the car and shows the family. It takes a little bit, but he gets it started and the brothers go for a ride. Robbie sells the car back to Mr. Smith (Sidney Clute), the car dealer. He makes enough money to pay off his debts and buy a car of his own. Steve Conte as Deliveryman.
117	6	"How Do You Know?"	Gene Reynolds	Story by : Joanna Lee; Teleplay by : Joanna Lee & Gail Ingram Clement	October 24, 1963	0134
Mike tells Steve that he thinks he's in love with Darlene (Julie Parrish). At the office, Steve's secretary, Helen Mason (Bobo Lewis), tells him they need to find a date for Sally Ann Morrison (Meredith MacRae in her first of 29 appearances). Sally is Mr. Barns' new secretary. Helen thinks Mike would be a perfect date, but Steve says he's taken. But he'll ask Mike if any of his friends would be interested. Meanwhile, there's a school dance coming up and Bub is teaching Chip to dance. Mike sets up a date for Sally with his friend Moose. Mike and Darlene will double date with them. Mike finds out that Moose broke a couple teeth and can't make the date. The three then go to a dance and Mike is not happy about it. Days later Steve brings Sally to the house. Mike tells Bub that Sally just rubs him the wrong way. Mike asks Darlene to wear his Fraternity pin, but he calls her Sally. Darlene knows things aren't right and they decide to be just friends. Mike asks Sally out. At first she says no, but then agrees to go out with him. Mike and Sally start to see more of each other. Chip had a great time at the dance because he played ping pong the whole night.
118	7	"My Friend Ernie"	Gene Reynolds	Story by : Shirl Gordon; Teleplay by : Shirl Gordon & George Tibbles	October 31, 1963	0130
Chip asks Bub if it's OK for his new friend Ernie Thompson (named after Ernie Bishop the cabbie driver from It's a Wonderful Life) to spend the night. Ernie claims to have a map of where a bank robber buried stolen money. The two boys go off on an adventure to find the treasure chest. Meanwhile, Bub is to be made Sergeant at Arms of his lodge and Steve is going out with model Valerie Hobbs (Patricia Blair). Chip and Ernie get lost in the woods. When the two are late for dinner, Bub sends Robbie out to look for them. Ernie decides to find his own way home using his map and Chip hopes Tramp will find the way back. While at dinner with Valerie, Steve gets a call from home telling him that Chip and Ernie aren't home yet. Bub also goes to look for the boys. Chip and Ernie run into each other. Steve and Valerie leave dinner to look for the boys. Tramp finds the way home and the boys go up to Chip's room without Mike and Sally noticing. Two policemen find Steve and Valerie and then Robbie and take them away. Alan and Myrtle Thompson (Richard Jury and Barbara Collentine) come to the Douglas house for news on the boys. Steve, Valerie and Robbie arrive. Robbie finds the boys asleep upstairs. Peter Leeds as Policeman. George Sawaya as Policeman. John Wesley as Policeman. Note: Barry Livingston's first appearance as Ernie.
119	8	"The End of You-Know What"	Gene Reynolds	James Allardice & Tom Adair	November 7, 1963	0128
Dr. Blackwood (Dayton Lummis), who lives down the street, believes that a planetoid will hit the earth in one weeks time. Dr. Hastings checks his figures and agrees it will be the end of the world. The men agree not to announce it for fear of panic. As they are in Blackwood's back yard, Chip and Ernie are eavesdropping. Chip doesn't believe it. He asks Mike about Dr. Blackwood and Mike says he's one of the top scientists around. Chip starts to think it could happen. Meanwhile, Blackwood and Hastings discover an error and there will be no collision. The boys agree to do good things with their time left. But whatever they do seems to backfire on them. Steve decides to talk to Chip and Chip finally tells him about the world coming to an end on Friday. Steve goes to see Dr. Blackwood and finds out about the mistake. It takes a little doing, but Steve convinces Chip that everything will be OK. Suddenly, the power, phone and water shut off and everyone starts wondering if it's really the end of the world. Chip comes in and tells the family that he forgot that he called to have everything shut off because of what was going to happen.
120	9	"The Toupee"	Gene Reynolds	Austin Kalish & Elroy Schwartz	November 14, 1963	0124
Bub's friend Harry Ferguson (Owen McGiveney) has a sister, Gladys (Viola Dana), who will be coming for a visit. Bub puts some hair restoring solution on his head in hopes of growing hair in order to impress Gladys. Mike and Robbie tease him about it. Ernie tells Chip that Bub should get toupee. Chip would like to surprise Bub and buy him one. While Bub is napping, Chip and Ernie manage to get an impression of Bub's head. The toupee arrives and Chip gives it to Bub. Bub is very grateful. But when he puts it on, the rest of the family starts laughing. Tramp barks at Bub and Robbie mentions how the toupee is the same color as Tramps fur. Chip overhears the family try and talk Bub out of wearing the toupee. Bub says he's going to wear it because Chip put a lot of effort into buying it. Chip finds a way to make Bub believe he'll look better without the toupee. Harry and Gladys arrive and Bub leaves with them for the evening. Tramp plays with Bub's toupee and Chip says it's OK as Bub doesn't need it.
121	10	"The Ever-Popular Robbie Douglas"	Gene Reynolds	Story by : Ernest Chambers; Teleplay by : Ernest Chambers & Gail Ingram Clement	November 21, 1963	0144
At school, Robbie is trying to get the attention of Amber Anderson (Linda Foster), but is having no luck. Robbie is running for a position on the student council. He only gets two votes and loses. Wanting to impress Amber, he decides to run for class president. Meanwhile, Joe Walters tells Steve that in order to get the contract he wants, he should spend some time golfing with the client. Steve believes that his design will win the client over. Robbie decides to change his personality to become more popular. He tells Steve to change his personality to win his client. Steve still thinks doing a good job is the best and thinks that's what Robbie should do. Everyone at school, including Amber, seems to like the new Robbie. But he only gets one vote and loses. Steve tells Robbie he won the client's contract because of his better design. Steve says Robbie should just be himself. Robbie calls Amber and she agrees to go out with him. Kim Hamilton as Librarian. Note: Ronne Troup, who plays Chip's wife in the final seasons, has an uncredited role in this episode.
122	11	"The Proposals"	Gene Reynolds	Douglas Tibbles	November 28, 1963	0140
Mike and Sally are watching a love story on TV and Mike tries to get around to proposing to her. Bub then interrupts them. Mike asks Steve how he proposed. Flashback to Young Steve (Tom Skerritt) and Louise sitting on a couch and Steve uses a casual approach. Meanwhile, Robbie mentions to Steve he has a date with both Ann Talmaster and Georgia Fleck (Janet Landgard) for the prom. Mike tries a casual proposal, but he doesn't get far with that. Robbie tries to get Georgia uninterested in him, but winds up with the date to the prom and them going steady. Bub tells Mike the romantic way he asked his wife to marry him. Mike tries the romantic touch with Sally, but she just laughs at him and they have a fight. Robbie tries to annoy Ann with a lot of corny romantic talk, but it backfires and he's also going steady with her. Mike tells Steve that Sally's going to have to ask him to get married. Steve tells Sally that her and Mike should make up, but Sally says Mike has to make the first move. Mike runs into Sally sitting on a park bench. Mike comes right out and pops the question in a traditional, straightforward manner. Sally accepts immediately and admits she should have done so the other times he tried to ask. Ann and Georgia find out that they are each going steady with Robbie and both break up with him. Note: Mike and Sally will marry in Episode 185 -- Season 6, episode 1.
123	12	"Steve and the Viking"	Gene Reynolds	Story by : Ken Englund; Teleplay by : Ken Englund and George Tibbles	December 5, 1963	0139
Joe Walters tells Steve that the bosses have picked him for an important job. Danishman Eric Willumsen (Gene Roth), whose company has an account with Steve's, is in town and wants to meet him. Mr. Gordon (Addison Richards) introduces Steve to Eric and his wife, Valberg Willumsen (Kate Murtagh). Steve then meets their attractive daughter Helga (Sally Kellerman). Steve is to entertain Helga because he's the only single guy at the plant who's taller than her. Helga keeps Steve out until very late at night. Steve barely gets any sleep and Mr. Gordon calls to tell him how pleased Helga is with him. She shows up early to go hiking with Steve. Helga then takes him to a steam bath and he gets a really rough massage. The family tells Sally that Helga is so energetic that Steve can't keep up with her. Steve comes home exhausted and goes to sleep. Joe comes by to remind Steve that he is to take Helga to a costume ball at the Danish consulate. Steve reluctantly agrees to go. Helga comes by and after putting on his costume, Steve refuses to go. When she reveals that the ball is being held to celebrate her seventeenth birthday, Steve appoints Robbie to go in his place. Robbie gladly agrees. Chuck Hicks as Masseur.
124	13	"Par for the Course"	Gene Reynolds	Gail Ingram Clement	December 12, 1963	0123
Robbie is practicing some golf and he meets Ted Cooper (George Petrie). Ted knows Steve and tells Robbie to sign up for the Father and Son tournament coming up. Robbie mentions that Steve is annoyed with him for always forgetting to pass on messages and other information. Robbie tells Steve that he signed them up for the tournament and Steve is excited. Robbie's friends, Gil (Christopher Connelly) and Dave, tell him it's not a good idea to be in the tournament with Steve. If Robbie screws something up, Steve will get mad at him. Robbie doesn't think Steve would be like that. Later, Robbie starts to worrying when Steve talks about winning the tournament. It's the day of the tournament and Steve is still talking about winning. The two are close to winning, but Robbie messes up on the last hole. Robbie walks off the course before Steve can say anything. Later that night, Robbie comes home. Steve tells Robbie how disappointed his is in him. Robbie says he's sorry and he won't play golf again. Steve tells him he's upset because Robbie forgot to give him another message. Steve says that as far as the golf is concerned, it's not that Robbie failed, it's that he did his best. Robbie feels better. Harlan Warde as Mr. Kruger.
125	14	"Windfall"	Gene Reynolds	Danny Simon and Milt Rosen	December 19, 1963	0127
Chip and Ernie want to join a club in their neighborhood, but the guys say they're too young. On the way home, Chip rescues a little dog that was trapped in a pipe. Its collar has an address on it and Chip takes the dog there. Ernie comes by the Douglas house and Chip isn't home yet. Chip arrives with a Mr. Dudley, who owns the dog. Mr. Dudley is very grateful as the dog is a valuable show dog. Mr. Dudley owns a sporting goods and toy store chain and as a reward, Chip can come by and pick something out. When Chip and Ernie go to the store, Chip learns he can have $250 worth of items. They come home with a truck load of stuff. Wheels (Tim Matheson) and the other boys from the club come by. Wheels says despite their age, both Chip and Ernie can join the Tigers. The boys play with all of Chip's new things. When no one plays with him, Ernie leaves. Steve runs into Ernie and finds out what happened. Steve tries to explain to Chip that the boys only became friends with him because of all the things he has. Steve hides everything in the garage. When the boys come by and see everything gone, Wheels kicks Chip out of the Tigers. Chip donates everything to a welfare home for boys and apologizes to Ernie. Billy Beck as Attendant.
126	15	"Top Secret"	Gene Reynolds	Hannibal Coons and Harry Winkler	December 26, 1963	0129
Steve gets a phone call and has to fly to Washington D.C. right away. Meanwhile Chip and Ernie are talking to their friend Richard (Billy Booth). Richard brags about how important his father is because he makes shoes. At the Pentagon, Steve speaks with Col. Ed Fisher (Byron Morrow), Mr. Henning (William Bryant) and others. Steve is asked to work on a top-secret, high-security project. He will work from home, but he's told the family will be under surveillance. Steve comes home and there are already men watching the house. The family wonders what Steve is working on in his locked room. The men follow the boys when they leave the house and they listen in on phone calls. Steve is away from his room and Chip goes in and sees some of the papers he's working on. Steve makes Chip promise to not tell anyone what he saw. Bub asks Steve what he's working on. Steve makes up a fanciful project and tells Bub to keep it a secret. Chip learns that Mr. Fowler (Bert Remsen) is following him. Chip tells Ernie and Richard he knows important stuff and the FBI is following him. Fowler and Morley (Robert Karnes) are listening. Bub is talking to Doris Randall (Patsy Garrett) and Mrs. Fletcher (Sandra Gould) in the grocery store. He tells them about the fanciful project Steve is working on and Fowler is listening. Steve tells Morley that he got that story from a comic book. Steve finishes the project. Note: This is the only episode where Fred MacMurray breaks the "4th wall" and looks directly at the camera to address the TV audience.
127	16	"Will Success Spoil Chip Douglas?"	Gene Reynolds	Ray Brenner and Robert Specht	January 2, 1964	0146
Chip comes home from school pretending to be sick. Steve can tell he's faking and asks him why he doesn't want to go to school the next day. Chip doesn't want to be picked to be Christopher Columbus in a school play. Ex-Vaudevillian Bub laments that there hasn't been a member of the Douglas family in show business for over thirty years. Bub makes Chip feel a little better about acting. The next day, teacher Miss Andrews (Joan Vohs) says the class must cooperate with student Millie Mae Peabody, who wrote the play. Chip accepts the role of Columbus. The students start to rehearse the play. Later, Chip tells Ernie that there's a family tradition of acting and he doesn't want to disappoint Bub. Bub gives Chip some tips on acting. At the next rehearsal, Millie Mae and Miss Andrews notice Chip's overacting. Miss Andrews tells Chip that they'll find another role for him that is more suited to his acting style. Chip tells Bub that he quit the play. Bub pretends to not be disappointed. Chip tells Steve that he was actually kicked out of the part and Steve says he should tell Bub the truth. Chip was given a smaller part. It's the night of the play and Ernie is Columbus. Chip portrays a Native American and Bub is proud. Jack Davis as Joey. Billy Booth as Charley.
128	17	"Second Chorus"	Gene Reynolds	Dorothy Cooper Foote	January 9, 1964	0152
It's Saturday night and the boys are surprised that Steve isn't going out. Steve meets Susan Duvall (Jaye P. Morgan), while he is out walking Tramp. Susan is upset because Tramp chased her little dog. Steve learns that Susan works at the Top Hat night club and she's working in a little while. Steve tells her that his son Mike was going there. Steve goes to the club and sits with Mike and Sally. Susan joins them and Steve stays out late with her. The next morning, Mike and Robbie are surprised at how youthful Steve is acting. Steve has another date with Susan and the next morning he is tired. Mike is worried that Steve is falling in love with a woman 20 years younger than him. Mike and Robbie go to speak with Susan and tell her Steve just can't keep up with her. She thinks everything is fine and even mentions marriage. Mike learns that Steve is taking a trip and Susan checked out of her hotel room. Something Bub says to them makes them realize that Steve does have a life of his own. When they mention marriage to Steve, he says that while he's had fun with Susan, he's not getting married. They are both just going to the airport together and then going their separate ways.
129	18	"Never Look Back"	Gene Reynolds	John McGreevey	January 16, 1964	0131
Steve performs some cheers from his college days for Bub, Robbie and Chip. They are not that impressed. Steve is looking forward to his twenty fifth year class reunion. Bub thinks the reunion is a silly idea, because everyone will have changed so much. Chip and Robbie think about some of the people they haven't seen in a while. Robbie goes to visit Georgina Williams (Cheryl Miller), who he knew from long ago. Chip takes Ernie to go see Pee Wee Andrews, an old friend who lives in a different neighborhood now. Pee Wee is now a big kid and calls himself Rocky. He remembers Chip giving him a hard time back then and chases Chip away. Robbie remembers Georgina being a tom-boy, but now she's a beautiful young woman. Robbie and Chip realize that Bub was right and want to talk Steve out of going. Heather Marlow (Frances Rafferty), from the old college days, comes by the house. She and Steve used to spend a lot of time together back then and they have a nice time reminiscing. They both decide to not attend the reunion because the two of them getting together was reunion enough. Marcia Mae Jones as Mrs. Williams. Stephen McEveety as Boy.
130	19	"Marriage By Proxy"	Gene Reynolds	George Tibbles	January 23, 1964	0142
Mike and Sally are having a cook out and their friends Wally and Barbara are invited. Wally and Barbara are married and Wally tells Mike that they have anniversaries for just about every first they've had. Wally and Barbara are having some fun chasing each other around when Barbara becomes dizzy. Bub says that she's pregnant. Later, Mike is a little nervous when Sally volunteers to watch a friend's 3 month old baby. Mike asks Steve if he thinks newlyweds are every ready to have children. Old friend Howard Sears (Beau Bridges) tells Mike that his wife, Francie (Indus Arthur), is going to have a baby at any time. Because he work's nights, Howard was wondering if Mike could make himself available to take Francie to the hospital should the baby come at night. A nervous Mike does wind up taking Francie to the hospital. Mike is in the waiting room with other husbands when he's told Francie had a baby girl. Howard shows up and Mike says he's never going through that again. Mike tells Steve he's breaking off the engagement because he's not ready for the stress. After Steve tells Mike about his experience when Mike was born, Mike decides he's still getting married. Janice Carroll as Night Nurse. Maxine Jennings as Second Nurse. Elsie Baker as Woman. Note: A pre-Petticoat Junction Mike Minor appears here as Herb.
131	20	"The Chaperone"	Gene Reynolds	Dorothy Cooper Foote	January 30, 1964	0148
Robbie needs a chaperone for a meeting at Betty McIver's (Quinn O'Hara) house where they'll decide what kind of birthday party she will have. Robbie convinces Bub to do it. When they get to the house, Bub meets all the kids. Bub gets a little strict about a couple dancing on the couch and everyone leaves. Back at home, Bub says he'll never chaperone again. Robbie is upset with Bub, but Steve makes him talk to Bub anyway. Steve tells Robbie that courtesy and respect are still important. Robbie brings Betty some flowers and suggests she have a costume party for her birthday. Betty is a bit dismissive and Robbie leaves. That night Robbie has a dream that he is in Victorian times and he calls on Betty. Everything is very prim and proper. Robbie, Betty and Mrs. McIver (Viola Harris) go for a ride in his horse and carriage. Mike, Chip and Bub drive up in a 1930's car and frighten the horse. Chip wakes Robbie up. The next day, Betty calls and tells Robbie that the other kids made fun of his costume party suggestion. Betty's friend Ethel Bigsby (Gail Gilmore) wants to play a trick on Robbie. They'll have Robbie bring over Bub as a chaperone and tell him that that gang decided to go with the costume party idea. Robbie and Bub will be the only ones in costume. The night of the party, Robbie and Bub arrive and find out they were tricked. Robbie doesn't think it's funny and starts to leave. Betty comes down the stairs in a Victorian dress and apologizes. Some party crashers show up, and Bub finds a way to get rid of them. All the kids are grateful and have a good time. Henry Z Jones Jr. as Jimmy Burns.
132	21	"My Fair Chinese Lady"	Gene Reynolds	John McGreevey	February 6, 1964	0153
Gloria Ruth is thrilled to be on a date with Robbie, but she suggests some changes in his appearance. Steve is with his friends Raymond (Benson Fong) and Mary Wong (Beulah Quo). Jimmy Soo (George Takei), a hip, young restaurateur, comes by and meets Steve. Jimmy is actually there to meet Chu Yin Tai, but Ray doesn't think the time is right. Ray explains to Steve that Yin Tai was groomed to marry a much older man in China, but he died. She is staying with Ray and Mary for now. Steve meets Yin Tai and she is very quiet and demure. Ray asks Steve to have Robbie help her adjust to America before meeting Jimmy. Meanwhile, Chip and Ernie try to change a girl they know, Ethel Mae, into a tom-boy. Robbie meets Yin Tai and asks her what she used to do for fun. She says she learned things to make her a better wife. Robbie gives her the nickname Sunny and starts to teach her the ways of young Americans. Robbie and Sunny get along very well and she learns much from him. Ray is going to have a party and will invite Jimmy. Sunny is a little anxious about meeting Jimmy. It's the night of the party and Sunny comes out acting all hip and obnoxious. She tells Ray she did it because she didn't want Jimmy to like her because he's much older than her. The party goes on and things work out. It's another day and Sunny and Robbie are at the malt shop. She suggests some changes in his appearance. Note: A pre-Star Trek George Takei appears here.
133	22	"House for Sale"	Gene Reynolds	Danny Simon and Milt Rosen	February 13, 1964	0157
Fred Gordon (Addison Richards) shows the family a film about Hawaii. Steve says the reason they saw the film is that he has a chance to do some work for Fred's company in Hawaii. The whole family can come along and they'll leave as soon as they sell the house. Mike doesn't want to go and leave Sally, but he couldn't say anything to Steve. Robbie's girlfriend Ina isn't happy either. Steve asks Bub if everyone is on board with the move and Bub says they are, but they really aren't. Steve flashes back to a talk about life he had with a young Chip. He then flashes back to an outdoor barbecue where Bub burned the meat and even Tramp wouldn't eat it. Steve then recalls when the family tried to put out a fire on the kitchen stove. The next day, Ina brings over a homemade surfboard for Robbie. She talks to Ernie about not wanting Robbie to leave. Mr. Gavin (Woodrow Parfrey) comes by and tells them he'll probably buy the house. Ernie makes up a bunch of things that are wrong with the house. Mr. Gavin changes his mind about the house. Next, Helen Taylor (Shelby Grant) really likes the house. But then her husband Harold comes in and says they're leaving. This time it was Ina that made up bad things about the house. It's been a week and the house hasn't sold. Real Estate agent Celia Evans tells Steve that she has another couple coming the next day. Ralph Proctor (Fredd Wayne) and his wife Florence (Jan Shutan) come by to look at the house. For some reason things are falling apart in the house and Steve tries to hide them. The Proctor's leave. Ina confesses to sabotaging the house and Steve learns that the family doesn't want to move. Note: In her first of 135 appearances, Tina Cole guest stars as Robbie's girlfriend Ina; three years later she'd appear as Katie Miller, Robbie's girlfriend and eventual wife.
134	23	"Stone Frog"	Gene Reynolds	Ed Jurist	February 20, 1964	0150
Chip and Ernie are walking down the street when Rajeet (Christopher Dark), a man from India, asks them for directions. The boys lead him to his cousin Siranee's (Kamala Devi) house. While Siranee gets some candy as a reward, the boys look at all the interesting things in her house. Siranee gives Chip a small stone frog and tells him it's magical. If one holds it and makes a wish, the wish will come true. At home, Chip wishes for some cherry ice cream. Bub comes home and says he bought chocolate, but when he looks at it, it's cherry. Chip asks Mike and Sally if they believe in magic and Mike says no. Something else that Chip wishes for comes true. Steve is walking with Chip and Chip sees Siranee. He wants Steve to ask her about the magic frog and she tells Steve the same thing she told Chip. Robbie wants to ask Dolores for a date and Chip tells him about the frog. Robbie then gets a call from Dolores and she wants to go out with him. Mike still insists there is no magic, but then another wish Robbie made comes true. Other things happen that keep Chip believing in the magic. Steve goes to speak with Siranee and meets Rajeet, Ankara and Sadi (Richard Hittleman). They help him understand the power of the mind. Siranee then talks to Chip and finds a way to explain that the magic is in the mind.
135	24	"Stage Door Bub"	Gene Reynolds	Story by : Robert Welch; Teleplay by : George Tibbles	February 27, 1964	0154
Bub goes backstage at a theater to see old friend Thelma Wilson (Pert Kelton). There he runs into Stage Manager Joe Fleck (Jerry Hausner). Bub knew Joe's parents. After her performance, Bub tells Thelma about how he takes care of the Douglas family. She tells him about the acting jobs she's had. Bub goes to see her perform almost every night for a week. He tells the family that he has invited Thelma over for dinner. Mike wonders if Bub has gotten the show-business bug again. At dinner, Thelma really envies Bub's life. Bub longs for the thrill of the stage. They decide to exchange jobs and talk Joe into it. Steve is not thrilled that Bub didn't tell them about this new arrangement and having a complete stranger move in. After his first performance, Bub comes by to pick up some things and tells Steve how much he enjoyed being on stage again. Both Thelma and Bub are having a hard time adjusting to their new lives. Robbie comes by to visit Bub and tells him the family is throwing him a farewell party before he goes on tour. Thelma tells Steve she wishes she were going on tour, but she doesn't want to spoil it for Bub. Bub says he doesn't want to go on tour because he'll miss the family too much. The two exchange jobs again.
136	25	"Fish Gotta Swim, Birds Gotta Fly"	Gene Reynolds	Austin Kalish and Elroy Schwartz	March 5, 1964	0151
Steve and the boys are going fishing. Mike says that, despite not knowing how to fish, Sally wants to go along. Mike knocks on Sally's door and wakes her up. By the time they get to the lake, all the good spots are taken. Steve tries to show Sally what to do, but things don't go smoothly. Sally gets frustrated. Steve catches a big fish and when Sally tries to net it, she lets the fish get away. It's the end of the day and Sally feels bad that things didn't go well. Sally tells her mother, Helen Morrison, that Mike expects her to go fishing with them every time and she's not looking forward to it. Helen suggests that every time Mike takes her fishing, she should make him do something that he wouldn't enjoy. Even though they know nothing about it, Helen suggests bird watching. Mike tells Steve that Sally expects him to go bird watching with her mother and sisters. Mike is not having a good time with Sally and the family. But then he reads something in a bird book and figures out that the women know nothing about bird watching and were just tricking him. Mike then pretends to be enjoying himself and leads the women all around the forest. Mike reveals that he knows they were tricking him and the women are not happy. Sally hasn't been answering Mikes calls. Steve tells Mike that Sally probably hates fishing and couples need to communicate more. Patricia Morrow as Nancy. Note: This is the first of eight appearances for Doris Singleton, two as Sally's mother and then six appearances in Season 11 as the mother of Chip's wife.
137	26	"Cherry Blossoms in Bryant Park"	Gene Reynolds	Story by : Kitty Buhler; Teleplay by : George Tibbles	March 12, 1964	0143
Bub reads a letter that says Kimiko, a woman Mike met in Tokyo, is coming for a visit. Bub is worried because Mike is with Sally now, but Steve isn't concerned. The letter also says that Kimiko is bringing her Chiyo with. Everyone wonders what a Chiyo is. Mike comes home from a field trip and Bub tells him Steve is picking up Kimiko from the airport. Mike doesn't know what he'll tell Sally. Steve arrives with Kimiko and it turns out Chiyo (Lisa Lu) is her Aunt. Sally meets Kimiko and Chiyo and then leaves. Sally won't answer Mikes calls. That night at dinner, Chiyo can't pronounce Bub, so she says Boob. Later, Mike shows Kimiko some of the town and he's a little uncomfortable. She tells Mike that she knows he's engaged and she says she's engaged as well. Sally and Kimiko have lunch together and Kimiko tells Sally how Japanese wives act. Mike and Sally go out and Sally starts acting a little subservient. Mike comes in the house and sees Kimiko and Chiyo giving Steve and Bub a neck rub. Mike learns that Kimiko told Sally that it's a wife's place to serve. Mike has some fun and makes Sally give him a back rub. She figures out what he's up to and they have a friendly pillow fight. Kimiko writes a thank you letter to the family when she gets back to Japan.
138	27	"What's the Princess Really Like?"	Gene Reynolds	Story by : Cynthia Lindsay; Teleplay by : Cynthia Lindsay & Gail Ingram Clement	March 19, 1964	0137
Steve once dated a woman named Joanne Norton. She moved to Europe and became a Princess after she married Prince Sundra (John van Dreelen). The two will now be visiting Bryant Park. Mr. Griffith (Tommy Farrell), a reporter, comes by and hopes to get a story from Steve, but Steve has nothing to say. As a result of the visit, the entire Douglas family receives formal invitation letters with an RSVP request for each. When Ernie and Wilson the dog come for a visit, Chip has some fun with writing the RSVP letter before he writes the real serious letter. When in a rush the next day, Chip accidentally hands Bub one of the joke letters, now on the way to the royal highness. Chip attempts to speak directly to the Prince and Princess to correct the mistake, and ends up unknowingly interacting with the Prince himself. Later that day, the Prince invites Chip inside where he is greeted with ice cream and cake. Despite these efforts, the Princess has requested the RSVP letters be delivered to her directly. Back home, nobody believes Chip when he tells of his adventure with the Prince. This is until the Prince and Princess Joanne arrive at the Douglas home, where Joanne proceeds to tell Chip that she thought the letter was very funny and not to worry. Sundra and Joanne stay dinner. Robert Patten as Hotel Manager. A pre-Sgt. Schultz John Banner has a bit part as Chief of Protocol.
139	28	"The People's House"	Gene Reynolds	Dorothy Cooper Foote	March 26, 1964	0122
Steve tells Bub that he'll be home late because it's the opening day of the aeronautical convention and he's on the welcoming committee. Steve meets Marta Robbins (Dianne Foster), who is an editor for a home decorators magazine. She was at another convention downstairs. Steve goes to the other convention hoping to run into Marta again. While there, he runs into Mike and Sally. Steve does find Marta and tries to make a date with her, but she seems to be very busy. He enters a magazine contest for distinctive homes because he learns that Marta comes to see the homes. Back at the house, Steve tries to set a romantic mood for when Marta arrives. But instead of Marta showing up, her secretary, Molly Dunbar (Jean Stapleton), shows up. Molly is an older woman. Molly tells Marta about meeting Steve's sons and Bub and about the house. Marta seems intrigued. Meanwhile, Bub and the boys are cleaning up the house for when the contest committee comes to judge the place. Bub really wants to win. Marta and the committee arrive. While Bub shows the committee the house, Steve introduces the boys to Marta. When the contest is over, the Douglas house doesn't even get mentioned. As a consolation, the boys give Bub a bust of himself that says "Champ Homemaker". John Alvin as Engineer.
140	29	"The Tree"	Gene Reynolds	Howard Snyder and Jack Harvey	April 2, 1964	0132
Steve finds a key and it's bothering him that he doesn't know what it's to. Mrs. Adams (Adrienne Marden) and Mrs. Hackett come by and ask Bub to sign a petition. Without knowing what it's for, Bub says no. Meanwhile, Robbie is seeing Juliet Johnson (Cheryl Holdridge). Her father has a tree at the end of his driveway that he wants the village to cut it down. The family learns that the petition that the women wanted Bub to sign was to save the tree. And Mrs. Elsie Martindale (Mary Adams) is one of the women. Because Bub likes Elsie, he is now interested in helping and goes to the Women's Betterment League. There he sits next to Elsie and makes an excellent suggestion to help their cause. The ladies and Bub picket in front the tree. Robbie is afraid about what Mr. Johnson will think when he finds out Bub is his grandfather. The next day, Bub stops Mr. Johnson from turning a hose on the ladies. Mr. Johnson does find out about Bub and Robbie and Juliet have to sneak around to see each other. Bub finds a way to have sentimental Mr. Johnson keep the tree. Mike finds a locked box in the attic and Steve's key opens it. Inside is another key. Templeton Fox as Genevieve. Note: In this episode we learn that Bub's late wife and the boys' maternal grandmother was named Mary. We also learn that the name "Bub" came from Chip's inability to say his real name, Bill.
141	30	"The Substitute Teacher"	Gene Reynolds	George Tibbles	April 9, 1964	0136
At dinner, Robbie mentions an essay he has to write for Mrs. Proctor's (Mabel Albertson) class. Mike remembers having her as a teacher. Robbie gets a phone call and is excited when he learns that Mrs. Proctor broke her leg and will be out for a while. The next day at school, attractive young Miss Martha Tinsley takes over as substitute teacher. The guys proceed to be very distracting in class and give her a hard time. This goes on for a couple weeks. While telling her friend, Mrs. Drake (Hope Summers), what the boys have been doing, Martha breaks down and cries. At home, Robbie tells the family what's been going on at school. Robbie gets an earful from both Steve and Mike after Mike recognizes Martha's name. The next day, Robbie tells the guys that he's going to leave Miss Tinsley alone. Robbie tells Steve that he went to Mrs. Proctor and asked her advice in helping Miss Tinsley. Now he feels funny about it, but Steve said he did the right thing. Mrs. Proctor goes to speak with Martha and teaches her how to handle the boys. Jimmy Boyd as Victor Peppitone. Danny Lockin as Jay Robinson. Bobby Diamond as Mickey. Linda Foster as Girl. Note: A pre-Peyton Place Christopher Connelly appears as Gil.
142	31	"Mike Wears the Pants"	Gene Reynolds	Douglas Tibbles	April 16, 1964	0125
Chip is sad when he learns that after Mike and Sally get married, Mike will move out. Mike would like to get married right away, but they would need money for an apartment. Because he wants to finish college, Mike suggests that Sally move into the Douglas house. Steve gives Mike the OK to have Sally move in, but he tells Bub he's not sure it's a good idea. Sally tells Bub she's not sure that moving in is a good way to start a marriage. Bub suggests she try it out for the weekend and she could have Mike's room for herself. Ernie is staying the weekend as well and things get a little hectic. Bub mentions to Sally that he's planned a wedding shower for Thursday. While Sally feels welcome, she would rather have some more privacy. Mike and Sally have dinner with their married friends, Howard and Francie Sears. Things don't go smoothly and Howard and Francie have a fight. Back at home, Mike thinks they should postpone the wedding. Not because of their friends fight, but because Mike thinks they should have their own apartment. This is exactly what Sally wanted to hear. Mike tells Chip that he's not getting married for a year and Chip is happy. Bub has to call everyone and cancel the wedding shower.
143	32	"The Guys and the Dolls"	Gene Reynolds	John McGreevey	April 23, 1964	0155
Mike is with some of his Air Force Reserve men. Randy Griggs' (Martin Sheen) father owns a toy company. They produced 10,000 defective dolls. Randy would like to go to a disaster area in South America and bring the girls there the dolls. Mike and the other guys aren't interested. Meanwhile, Chip and Ernie are supposed to do some good deeds. Chip helps old lady Mrs. Sowerby (Mary Young) across the street and carries her bags for her. Mike tells the family about Randy's idea and they think Mike should do it. Randy comes by and tells Mike that Colonel Kramer gave the mission the go ahead. The Reservists get to the flooded out town and start to distribute the dolls. Mike meets a little mute girl named Luise. Chip is wearing himself out doing things for Mrs. Sowerby. Mike wants to bring Luise back home to have the doctors there look at her. Steve gets a telegram to pick up Luise at the airport. The family thinks it's some young woman. They are surprised when Luise is a little girl. Mike arrives home and says that a doctor has volunteered his services. The operation is a success and Luise can now speak. To give Chip a break, Steve helps Mrs. Sowerby. Mike Minor as Carl Janson. James Victor as Pete.
144	33	"The Ballad of Lissa Stratmeyer"	Gene Reynolds	Story by : Glenn Wheaton & Mannie Manheim; Teleplay by : Glenn Wheaton & Mannie Manheim and Douglas Tibbles	April 30, 1964	0156
Robbie's school football team is losing game after game. Lissa Stratmeyer (Patricia Morrow), one of the cheerleaders and Robbie's girlfriend, tries to make him feel a little better. Apparently, the school is only letting boys with good grades play on the team and they are not always the best athletes. The team is very despondent and wants to forfeit the last game. Mike writes a song making fun of the team and Robbie likes it. The girlfriends of the team players decide to stage a boycott against the boys until they beat Freemont High at the last game. Even Lissa gives Robbie the ultimatum. The guys try other girls their age, but they want the team to win as well. The guys then decide to ask freshman girls to the victory rally the night before the game. Robbie asks Debbie Rogers. When he picks her up, Robbie meets Debbie's older sister Arlene and winds up taking her and Debbie to the rally. At the rally, Robbie is surprised when he learns Arlene and Lissa are old friends. Lissa talks Arlene into leaving with Debbie. The next day, the team tries hard but still loses. Steve finds a way to show Robbie the team won a moral victory. Tommy Ivo as Tom. Hank Jones as Don. Bobby Diamond as Mark. Heather Menzies as Mona. Note: A young Ann Jillian (It's a Living, Jennifer Slept Here) appears as Debbie Rogers.
145	34	"Tramp Goes to Hollywood"	Gene Reynolds	Glenn Wheaton and Mannie Manheim	May 7, 1964	0133
Jack Keeler, who works for Gordon Bernard (Phillip Pine) Productions of Hollywood, stops Steve as he's about to walk Tramp. Jack thinks Tramp would be great for the animal lead in a movie they're making. Bub, Robbie and Chip go out to Hollywood with Tramp so he can do a screen test. Jack greets them at the studio and introduces them to Gordon. They also meet the co-star in the film, Joanne Grant (Joy Harmon). Robbie has lunch with Joanne and Bub tries to get Gordon to audition Robbie. Chip winds up being a stand-in for child actor, Johnny VanBaron (Kevin Brodie). It's time for Tramp's screen test and things do not go smoothly. Robbie tries to get some audition time in as well. The next day they watch the film footage and Robbie realizes how poorly he did. Back at home, Chip gets a check in the mail for his stand-in work. They also get a letter from Gordon stating that Tramp didn't get the part.
146	35	"Adventure in New York"	Gene Reynolds	Ed James and Seaman Jacobs	May 14, 1964	0149
Mike and Robbie have been writing songs and sending them to publishers in New York. But they all get sent back because the publishers don't look at unsolicited items. Bub tells them they need to go to New York and submit the songs in person. Bub thinks his show business friend Charlie Turner (J. Pat O'Malley) could introduce the boys to someone. Steve reluctantly says the boys can go. Once in New York the boys meet Charlie. He tells them he's set up an appointment with big-time publisher Buddy Albert. But when they get to Buddy's office, he won't be able to see them until next week. The boys Cabbie, Eddie Fowler (Joe Mantell), wants to help them. Eddie finds a way for the boys and Buddy to ride together in his cab. The boys sing their song for Buddy. Although Buddy doesn't want the song, he gives them some real-life solid advice. Mike and Robbie later find out that Charlie's not the big shot in show business that Bub claimed he still is. Back at home, the boys don't want to hurt Bub, so they talk up Charlie. Sidney Clute as Frank. Sandra Gould as Receptionist. Charles Lampkin as Herman. Maurice Manson as George the Clerk. Note: The featured song, "A Broken Heart Knows Better", was written by (musician/singer) Don Grady and (lyricist) Gary Abrams. The song was not a hit at the time, but has since become a '60s retro-favorite.
147	36	"Huckleberry Douglas"	Gene Reynolds	George Tibbles	May 21, 1964	0145
Chip has to do a book report and gets the book Tom Sawyer from the library. Ernie checks out the book as well. That night, Chip and Ernie talk on the phone about how much they enjoy the book. After everyone is in bed, Ernie comes by the house and wants Chip to sneak out so they could go on an adventure like in the book. Ernie brought a table top they could use as a raft. They go to the creek, but it's too dry. The boys stay out all night. The next morning, Steve reads a note Chip left about going to the creek. Melinda sees Chip and Ernie with the table top. She's been reading Tom Sawyer as well and wants to join them, but they say no. The boys go to a river and Melinda shows up. She brought food so they go with her to look at a cave. While they're eating a bobcat shows up and the kids run away. They then see some men digging a hole and think they're going to bury someone. The kids run away when the men see them. The kids then run into a man named Jim (Joel Fluellen). They go with Jim to where the men were digging and he says the hole was for people with the water company. Mike and Robbie find them and they say goodbye to Jim. Back at home, Steve was not happy about Chip's adventures and wants to know where he's going from now on. Kim Hamilton as Librarian.
148	37	"Guest in the House"	Gene Reynolds	John McGreevey	May 28, 1964	0147
Steve is at the Engineer's Club Dinner where Judge Helen Weston (Sarah Selby) is the guest speaker. She is a judge of the Juvenile Division. Helen talks about a project where delinquents are placed in good homes for a while. Mr. Chandler (John Alvin) volunteers his home. Steve reluctantly agrees to his house as well. The boys are not thrilled about having a guest in the house for a week. Steve, at the last minute, has to go out of town. He calls Judge Weston and asks to postpone the boy's visit. Bub is on vacation and he calls Steve. He says that his friend's nephew, Gilbert Thornbury (Tony Dow), will be staying in his room at home for a few days. Steve leaves a note about Gilbert and then leaves. The boys think Gilbert is the delinquent. When Gilbert arrives, the boys are very stern with him. And they misinterpret much of what Gilbert says. More misunderstandings occur and a Policeman (Frank Gerstle) even gets involved with one of them. Some of Gilbert's friends come to visit him and Robbie kicks them all out. The boys find out who Gilbert really is and feel bad.

=== Season 5 (1964–65) ===
No. overall	No. in season	Title	Directed by	Written by	Original release date	Prod. code
149	1	"Caribbean Cruise"	James V. Kern	George Tibbles	September 17, 1964	0171
Robbie gets a job on a cruise ship going to the Caribbean. As it happens, Steve will be on the same ship for a business trip to establish business with a new company. The two meet Ray Davis (Walter Reed) at the dock, where Ray gives Steve the tickets and instructions for who Steve is to meet with. On the ship and finding him attractive, Jeri Schronk (Mary Wickes), Marie Pomeroy (Jane Dulo) and Claudia Marcus (Muriel Landers) strike up a conversation with Steve. And they continually find ways to run into him. It gets to the point where Steve tries to hide from them. Robbie is kept busy and occasionally runs into Steve. Even when the ship goes to port, the ladies find Steve. One night, it's costume night and the ladies tell Steve they've made a costume for him. Steve sees Jordan Martin, the man he's to make contact with. It turns out Mr. Martin doesn't speak English. Steve runs into Lois Wilson (Kathleen Crowley) and has a nice conversation with her. Robbie comes by with Carlotta Martin, daughter of Jordan. It turns out that Lois can speak Spanish and will interpret Steve and Jordan's conversation. The cruise is almost over and Steve and Lois enjoyed their time together very much. Back at home, Steve and Robbie tell the family they had a great time. Byron Morrow as Officer. Olan Soule as Sam.
150	2	"A Serious Girl"	James V. Kern	John McGreevey	September 24, 1964	0163
Robbie is on a date with Dottie at the Malt shop. Pete (Hank Jones) is there with Lorraine Pendleton (Marta Kristen). Pete gets along with Dottie better so they switch tables. Lorraine is happy to be with Robbie because she thinks Pete acts like a child. Meanwhile, Ernie tells Chip that he's hiding from Verna Mae Rittenhouse (Melody Thomas Scott). Steve tells Bub that a Mrs. Hamilton called for him. Bub says she's looking for a husband. Robbie has date with Lorraine and meets her parents, Carl (Russ Bender) and Margaret (Natalie Masters). Robbie learns that Lorraine is mature for her age and isn't interested in things like football games and dances. She talks about career, marriage and children. The next day, Robbie tells Steve and Mike how nice it is to be with a woman who treats him as an adult. Something happens with a ring and Robbie is trapped into an engagement with Lorraine. All of Chip's suggestions to Ernie on how to get rid of Verna Mae backfire and she likes Ernie even more. When Steve finds out what happened with Robbie, he and Bub go talk to Carl and Margaret. The four devise a plan to hopefully get Robbie and Lorraine to reconsider the idea of marriage. But later, Robbie tells Steve that he and Lorraine had broken off the engagement days before.
151	3	"The Practical Shower"	James V. Kern	Gail Ingram Clement	October 1, 1964	0159
Bub is talking about Mike and Sally's upcoming wedding shower. Mike and Sally are window shopping and she points out expensive things she would like. Mike tells Steve he's worried about having enough money. Mike says that they want to have a kitchen bridal shower and get practical gifts that they could use. Bub thinks they should have a romantic shower. Bub wants to buy a Persian cat that Sally liked until he hears the price. Sally visits Steve at work and tells him she wants to get Bub a gift. Steve suggests a gold chain Bub wanted for a key his wife gave him long ago. Steve tells Mike that there's nothing wrong with being impractical once in a while. Chip and Ernie trap a bunch of wild cats so Sally can pick one. It's the night of the shower and Sally is getting a lot of practical gifts. Tramp is barking because all the cats are in the basement. The cats escape and disrupt the shower. Bub had sold his key and bought Sally the Persian cat. Not knowing Bub sold the key, Sally gives him the gold chain. Mike winds up being impractical as well and bought back Bub's key and gives it to him. Shirley O'Hara as Miss Olander.
152	4	"Dublin's Fair City: Part 1"	James V. Kern	George Tibbles	October 8, 1964	0160
Bub wins the Irish Sweepstakes and wants to take the family to Ireland. Bub and his cousin Mickey O'Casey (Robert Emhardt) went in on the tickets together. Steve thinks Bub should spend the money on himself, but Mike talks Steve into it. In Ireland, Mickey tells Postman Brophy (John McLiam) that he doesn't want his mother, Kate O'Casey (Jeanette Nolan), to know he was gambling in the sweepstakes. The family arrives in Ireland and head to Mickey's place. Meanwhile, Mary Kathleen Connolly (Mariette Hartley) brings Kate her mail. A surprised Mickey sees the letter from Bub saying he's coming for a visit. The family shows up at Mickey's house. Mickey wasn't expecting them so soon and he tells Bub not to say anything about the sweepstakes to his Aunt Kate. Kate is 103 years old and thinks Bub is her brother. She thinks Chip is young William O'Casey. Despite Mickey hoping the family would go to a hotel, Kate invites them to stay. Later, Steve runs into Mary Kathleen. She finds him attractive and wants to show him around. Steve tells her that Bub was disappointed that there weren't a lot of O'Casey's around to greet him. Mary Kathleen manages to get a welcome party for Bub. Kate finds out about Mickey winning the sweepstakes and is actually happy about it. Ollie O'Toole as Paddy O'Casey. Dal McKennon as Cabbie.
153	5	"Dublin's Fair City: Part 2"	James V. Kern	George Tibbles	October 15, 1964	0161
Tom Grogan (Sean McClory), the Mayor, has come to take the O'Casey's to the parade. Mary Kathleen Connolly was engaged to Tom at one time, but does not care for him now. Bub then addresses a crowd and tells a few jokes. Steve and Mary Kathleen go for a bike ride and then rest by a pond. From behind a tree, Tom is watching them. It's dinner time and Steve is still out. When Steve shows up, Aunt Kate sends him to his room without dinner. The next morning Steve is about to ride into town on the bike. While Steve's talking to Aunt Kate, Tom lets the air out of one of the tires. Steve rides Kate's small bike into town. Mary Kathleen asks Steve if there's a woman in his life and Tom comes by and interrupts them. Steve and Mary Kathleen are at the pond again and Tom shoots chestnuts at Steve. Mary Kathleen sees Tom and he runs away. That night, Kate tells Steve that Mary Kathleen would marry anyone just to go to America. After a suggestion from Kate, Steve finds a way to have Mary Kathleen appreciate Ireland and Tom again. The family heads home.
154	6	"One of Our Moose is Missing"	James V. Kern	Seaman Jacobs & Ed James	October 22, 1964	0158
Steve has George Summers (Allyn Joslyn) over to the house to do some work over the weekend. Chip and Ernie remind Steve that he was to lead their Cub Scout adventure planned this weekend, doing a moose patrol. Steve completely forgot and promises to take the boys next weekend. George reluctantly agrees to go on the trip because he needs the plans done by Monday. At the campsite, George tries to teach the boys how to start a fire, while Steve works. George then takes them "Tracking and Trailing". Ernie keeps telling George he's not doing things according to the manual. That night, George tells the boys science fiction stories instead of ghost stories and the boys love it. The next morning Steve's work is interrupted because he needs to find more water. Steve finds a lake but then falls into a well and can't get out. George is tired of all the delays and goes to hitch a ride back. The boys go to look for Steve. They find a cow. They think they're lost but they eventually find Steve. The boys have a rope but can't pull Steve out. They use the cow to pull the rope. George comes back and they head for home. Back at the house, Steve gives George the finished plans. Steve was able to figure things out while he was in the well. Kevin Brodie as Larry.
155	7	"Lady President"	James V. Kern	Tom Adair & James B. Allardice	October 29, 1964	0168
Chip and Ernie tell Mike that Chip is running for class president. He's running against Kathy Bigelow. Meanwhile, Mr. Preston (Lewis Martin) would like Steve to entertain Congresswoman Barbara Maitland (Betsy Jones-Moreland) for a few days. Steve doesn't want to do it, but then he sees her and changes his mind. Kathy tells teacher Miss Fleming (Joan Vohs) that she doesn't think she can win because there are more boys in the class. Miss Fleming mentions that a Congresswoman is visiting town. Kathy goes to see Barbara and she agrees to help Kathy with her campaign. Barbara suggests Kathy challenge Chip to a debate, but Chip declines. Steve and Barbara are enjoying their time together. Barbara gives Kathy some more campaign suggestions. Barbara comes to the Douglas house for dinner. The subject of the class president comes up and Barbara mentions the cheap tactics the boy is using. She and Steve have no idea Chip is that boy. Later that evening, Chip confesses to Steve that he's the boy they were talking about and he feels bad now. The election winds up being a tie with 10 votes each. Miss Fleming runs a second vote with a show of hands. Chip votes for Kathy breaking the tie.
156	8	"A Touch of Larceny"	James V. Kern	Story by : Arnold and Lois Peyser; Teleplay by : Arnold and Lois Peyser & George Tibbles	November 5, 1964	0178
Robbie got more stamps from the grocery store than he should have and Chip wonders if it's fair to keep them. Mrs. Donaldson (Hope Summers), who's always trying to get a woman for Steve, comes by. She wants Steve to meet her cousin Maude and Steve lies and says he'll be busy. Chip witnesses this and Bub cheating at cards. Chip tells Steve about a boy at school that sometimes steals lunches and wants to know if that's OK. Steve tries to explain the difference between a "white lie' and real dishonesty. When Steve is almost going to write off a lunch with friends as a business meeting, he remembers his talk with Chip. At school, Chip and Ernie are about to try and steal their lunches, but then decide against it. When Steve's car is overparked, he's about to try and get away with it, but changes his mind. Steve tries to explain to the Policewoman why he was putting the chalk mark back on his tire. Chip and Ernie tell Steve that some of the boys that stole the lunches got caught. Chip and Ernie are glad they didn't go through with it. Steve reluctantly agrees to go out with Maude. Templeton Fox as Mrs. Rasmussen Donald Curtis as Fred. Carleton Young as Henry.
157	9	"Goodbye Again"	James V. Kern	John Considine & Tim Considine	November 12, 1964	0177
Ernie is pretending to be James Bond and Sally hires him to keep an eye on Mike. Robbie answers a phone call and it's Jean Pearson (Cynthia Pepper for her ninth and final appearance). She has returned to Bryant Park to visit her Grandmother and would like to reconnect with some old friends. Mike runs into Jean in town and Ernie sees them. They agree to have lunch the next day and Ernie sees them in the restaurant. The two flashback to the night Jean learned she was moving and they wondered if they're in love. Back to the present, Mike wants to tell Jean about Sally, but can't do it. Ernie tells Sally about Mike and Jean. That night, Sally hopes Mike will say something about Jean, but he doesn't. At work, Steve can tell something is bothering Sally. Mike confesses to Steve that he hasn't told Jean and Sally about each other. Mike's not sure how he feels about Jean now. Steve tells Mike that Sally told him about Jean. During the night, Mike goes to Sally's house and apologizes for not saying anything about Jean. He assures Sally that he still loves her and will tell Jean. The next day, Robbie calls Jean and wants to be her escort to dinner at the Douglas house. He doesn't know that Mike hasn't said anything yet and mentions how Mike will be with Sally. Jean is stunned to learn Mike is engaged and says she'll be leaving that day. As Jean is leaving, Mike comes by. She lies and says that she has someone waiting for her at home. They bid each other farewell, this time for good.
158	10	"The Coffee House Set"	James V. Kern	John McGreevey	November 19, 1964	0165
After school band practice, Robbie plays Sherry's (Tina Cole) guitar and she is impressed. She would like to get him an audition at a local coffee house. Meanwhile at work, Al (James Seay) asks Steve what he's doing for the weekend. Al's sister-in-law is in town and he thought Steve might want to spend some time with her. Steve politely declines as she is a little too wild for him. Robbie picks up Sherry to go to the audition in a suit and tie. Sherry tells him he can't wear something that "square". Robbie meets Itchy (Jamie Farr), the owner of the hip coffee house. The audience likes Robbie and he is given a job to play his guitar there some evenings. One night Steve goes to the coffee house and meets Lola (Gloria Talbott). She wants to paint his picture with mustard and jelly. Steve sees Robbie who now has a fake beard. The next day, Lola calls Steve several times, but he doesn't take the calls. The family all put on fake beards and try to show Robbie how silly he looks and acts. At first Robbie is upset, but then he finds the humor in it. Lola stops by Steve's office and he's surprised to see her dressed very conservatively. Carol Connors as Tonya.
159	11	"The Lotus Blossom"	James V. Kern	John McGreevey	November 26, 1964	0179
The Douglas' and Ray (Benson Fong) and Alice Wong (Beulah Quo) are having dinner at the Lotus Blossom restaurant. The Wong's daughter, Janie, is making eyes at Chip. The next day, Ray tells Steve that Mei Ling (Lisa Lu), the owner of the restaurant, will be selling and go back to Hong Kong. She's been running the place since her older husband died and it's the only life she knows. Ray would like Steve to try to convince her to stay as there are many great things to do in America. Meanwhile, Ernie lost all his prized marbles and would like Chip to try and win them back. It turns out that Ernie lost them to Janie. Steve tells the Wong's that Mei accepted an invitation to go to a party with him and his friends. Later, Mei tells Ray that she would like to back out of going to the party. Mei cherishes Steve's friendship and doesn't want to ruin it by not knowing how to act around his friends. Chip gets upset when Janie wins all of his marbles. She wants to return them, but he refuses. Steve picks up Mei for the party and she is beautiful. At first things are awkward for Mei, but it's not long before she fits right in and has a good time. At the end of the night, Mei thanks Steve. Janie finds a way for Chip to win his marbles back and they become friends. Mei tells Steve that because he gave her her confidence back, she's going to open a Chinese restaurant in Paris. Shelby Grant as Dorothy Maven.
160	12	"First, You're a Tadpole"	James V. Kern	Don Grady & Gary Abrams	December 3, 1964	0167
At the last minute, Mike has to go out of town for the Air Force Reserve. Mike asks Robbie to fill in and take Sally to a Jazz concert the next night. Robbie had a date with Ellen (Charla Doherty), but agrees to help Mike. Mike also asks Robbie to take Sally shopping the next morning. The next day while having lunch, Robbie asks Sally's advice about Ellen. He feels she may not be mature enough for him. The weekend is over and Mike returns. Robbie is paying a lot of attention to Sally and Mike notices. Sally plays along because she believes Rob is trying to make Ellen jealous. But it's not long before Sally thinks Robbie is developing feelings for her. She goes to talk to Steve about it. Steve says it's not uncommon for a boy to fall for a more mature woman. Sally wants to take Robbie to a progressive art exhibit so he sees he doesn't fit in with the "mature" crowd. But things backfire when Rob did some research and actually fits in. Steve tries to persuade Robbie to cope with his feelings for Sally. But it's something that Chip says that makes Robbie understand. Mike Minor as Stanley.
161	13	"You're in My Power"	James V. Kern	Dean Hargrove	December 10, 1964	0170
Chip and Bub are watching TV hypnotist Dr. Zoltan (Booth Colman) and Bub thinks it's all fake. Robbie is brought up from the audience to participate. Dr. Zoltan starts to hypnotize Robbie but then the TV picture goes out. It turns out that Bub also got hypnotized. Chip just happens to snap his finger and Bub comes out of the trance. For the next couple of days, Robbie's in his room practicing hypnosis. And every time someone whistles, Bub breaks out in a dance. At school, Robbie thinks he briefly hypnotized Marjorie Taylor (Sandy Descher), a girl he is interested in. Marjorie tells a friend she just played along with Robbie as a joke. That night, Marjorie invites Robbie over to her house. He doesn't know it, but she has friends over for a slumber party and wants to use him for entertainment. Marjorie tells Robbie she loves him and he confesses that he hypnotized her. She pretends to not believe it and wants him to prove his powers by hypnotizing her friends. All the friends play along and pretend to be hypnotized. Meanwhile, Mrs. Thompson (Barbara Perry), Ernie's mother, complains to Steve that Robbie hypnotized him. Ernie and Chip confess to just faking it. Mrs. Taylor (Evelyn Scott) comes home and is upset that Robbie hypnotized the girls. Robbie panics when he can't get them out of the trance. The girls start laughing and tell Robbie it was all a joke. Embarrassed, Robbie leaves. Steve takes Bub to Dr. Zoltan to stop his dancing. Steve makes Robbie feel a little better. At school, Marjorie apologizes to Robbie and they decide to go on a date.
162	14	"The In-Law Whammy"	James V. Kern	Danny Simon & Milt Rosen	December 17, 1964	0166
Robbie sees in the paper that Sally's father Tom Morrison (Sebastian Cabot), a famous, globe-trotting archaeologist, is coming to town. He's coming to meet Mike and will be here the next day. Mike doesn't seem to be anxious about it. But the more his family asks how he's doing, the more nervous Mike gets. Steve's co-worker, Mark Felson, belongs to an archaeology club and they would like to make Tom an honorary member. Mike meets Tom and becomes a clumsy, accident-prone bundle of nerves. Tom becomes the recipient of a series of messy but funny indignities. Tom and Sally are invited to the Douglas house for dinner, but Steve is still at work and doesn't know about it. Bub gets a call for Steve that the archaeology club banquet is being moved to a bigger room at the hotel. Tom and Sally arrive at the house and the accidents continue. Steve arrives home and accidentally causes Tom to be stuck in a closet. It's the night of the archaeology club banquet and Steve and Mike go to pick up Tom. Bub forgot to tell Steve about the room change. This results in Tom being initiated, unwillingly, into a wacky lodge while Steve and Mike are kept out of the room. Mark Felson finds Steve and tells him about the room change, but it's too late. The next day, good-natured Tom takes things in stride. Charles Fredericks as Club President. Gil Lamb as First Man.
163	15	"Robbie and the Nurse"	James V. Kern	Phil Davis	December 24, 1964	0172
Robbie has to go to the hospital after he fractures his leg on the football field. The family comes to see Robbie and they meet his nurse, Yvonne Philip (Danielle De Metz). She is an attractive woman from France and she spends a lot of time with Robbie. It's a few days later and Robbie is back home. Yvonne comes to visit him. While there, she continues to pamper Robbie. The family wonders why Yvonne is spending so much time with Rob. Chip and Ernie are playing football outside and Ernie meets Linda Sue Clark. She's new on the block and wants to show Ernie her pony. Chip is upset when Ernie leaves with her. It's been two weeks and Yvonne is still coming by. Bub thinks it's because of Steve. Steve asks Sally what she thinks and Sally agrees with Bub. Mike knows an Intern at the hospital and the Intern thinks Yvonne comes by because of Steve. Chip continues to refuse to talk to Ernie. Robbie has a bunch of his friends come by to meet Yvonne. Steve wants to talk to Yvonne to get her uninterested in him. Steve learns that as he was her first case, she really wanted to take good care of Robbie. Chip finds out that Ernie was spending time with Linda Sue because of the pony. Bobby Clark as Eddie.
164	16	"Divorce, Bryant Park Style"	James V. Kern	Earl Barrett	December 31, 1964	0174
Late at night, Mike's friend Howard Sears (Buck Taylor) wakes up Steve wanting to talk to Mike. Steve gets Mike. Howard and his wife Francie (Indus Arthur) have had a fight and he was wondering if he could spend the night. Howard tells Mike they've decided to get divorced. In the morning, Steve suggests the couple see a counselor. Mike and Sally go to see Francie about the counselor. Francie's parents, Mr. (Robert Shayne) and Mrs. Marfield (Templeton Fox) are there. They tell Francie she was too young to get married and have a child. Because Howard agreed to it, Francie will see a counselor with him. Francie talks to Dr. Maguire (Jocelyn Brando), the counselor, alone and tells her she believes that Howard hates their daughter Susan. It's Howard's turn and he complains that Francie never has any time for him. Mike and Sally have an argument over who's at fault for Howard and Francie's problems. Mike tells Steve he's worried about him and Sally working out. Steve tries to reassure Mike. At court, Howard, Francie, Mike and Sally witness another young couple getting a divorce. Later, Mike and Sally are watching Susan. Mike tells Sally he won't let the same thing happen to them. Howard and Francie come back saying they're not getting divorced. Charlotte Stewart as Young Wife.
165	17	"A Woman's Work"	James V. Kern	James Allardice & Tom Adair	January 7, 1965	0175
Bub decides to fly to Ireland to visit his 104-year-old aunt for her birthday. Steve says he'll be able to do the cooking and take care of the house. At dinner, Chip complains that Ruth Ellen McPhister, a girl a school, always ignores him. Mike tells Steve that there's more to running the house than Steve thinks. Steve thinks women make it seem harder than it really is. It's not long before Steve breaks the washing machine and the oven. Chip wants to join the school orchestra because Ruth Ellen is in it. Steve over bleached the bed sheets and now they all tear apart. Mike thinks they should hire someone to help. Chip invites Ruth Ellen over for dinner. Things are very chaotic in the kitchen as everyone tries to get the meal served. Ruth Ellen speaks very eloquently and has very serious manners. She does seem to be interested in Robbie. Steve burns the food and they have to order out. After Ruth Ellen goes home, Steve is afraid they ruined Chip's evening. Chip decides he no longer cares about Ruth Ellen. After Steve burns breakfast, the family decides to hire someone. Johnny Silver as Vendor. Note: This was William Frawley's 165th and final appearance as William Francis "Bub" O'Casey.
166	18	"Here Comes Charley"	James V. Kern	George Tibbles	January 14, 1965	0180
Bub is still in Ireland and Steve is unable to take care of the house and work also. Steve hires Fedocia Barnett (Reta Shaw) to keep house. Fedocia complains about everything and the boys don't get along with her. Steve tells Mike that they'll have to try and make it work with Fedocia. Things finally come to a head and Steve is about to tell her to leave. Just then the doorbell rings and it's Bub's brother Charley O'Casey. Charley was in the Merchant Marines. He'll be leaving for San Francisco to get on a boat to the Caribbean in a few days. Steve asks him to stay with them till then. When Fedocia hears Charley's staying, she says she's leaving. Mike, Robbie and Steve are doing the cooking. When they leave the kitchen, Charley tells some stories to Chip, throws away the food and starts cooking himself. Charley lets the guys think that it was their food. Steve needs to leave for a couple days on business. Steve calls and Chip tells him his school's open house is that evening. Chip knows Charley is leaving that night. But Charley's a little disappointed that Chip didn't ask him to go to the open house. Charley learns from Robbie that Chip wanted to ask him. Chip is thrilled when Charley shows up at the school. Charley decides to stay and help the family. Joan Vohs as Teacher. Note: William Demarest joins the cast in his first of 215 appearances as Bub's brother Charley O'Casey.
167	19	"Charley and the Kid"	James V. Kern	Story by : Kitty Buhler; Teleplay by : George Tibbles	January 21, 1965	0186
Steve's friend Frank (John Lupton) asks if Steve can watch his young Korean daughter Lee Ahn (Cherylene Lee) for a couple days until he can find a permanent caretaker. Frank has finally found her after her mother was killed and she had been lost during the war. Charlie is not happy about the idea. Lee Ahn shows signs of trauma as she is constantly stealing and hoarding things. Lee Ahn overhears Charlie tell Steve that she is nothing but trouble, so she runs away. Now Charlie is sick with worry. Everyone is out looking for her and Charlie finds her. Charlie and Lee Ahn become quite fond of each other. Charles Lampkin appears as a Police Sergeant.
168	20	"He Wanted Wings"	James V. Kern	Tom Adair & James B. Allardice	January 28, 1965	0164
Robbie buys an old small airplane which has seen better days, with plans to slowly rebuild it. He also knows it will impress a girl he likes, Vicki Curtis. Steve lets Robbie keep it as he doesn't believe Robbie will ever get it to fly. When Steve gets back from a business trip, he finds that his friend Ed Welch (Vaughn Taylor) has helped Robbie to actually get the plane running. Steve has a dream that they are back in WWI and that he and Robbie are fighter pilots. Robbie winds up shooting at Steve's plane instead of the enemy's plane. The next day, Steve sees the plane flying in the sky and is terrified that it is Robbie flying it. Robbie shows up and says he sold the plane to Mr. Welch and that is him up in the sky. Robbie now buys an old frog man suit.
169	21	"Be My Guest"	James V. Kern	Stanley Davis & Elon Packard	February 4, 1965	0181
Robbie's latest girlfriend Polly Andrews (Gigi Perreau) takes him to her father's country club and suggests that his father join. She says her father Jerry (Roy Roberts) will sponsor the whole family. When Robbie gets home, he tells Steve he should join the club because it is where the important people gather. The following Saturday, the whole family goes to check out the Club. Despite Jerry getting along with Steve, some of the rest of the family do not make a good impression. Jerry invites the family to the dinner dance that evening. After some of the other members voice their objections, they decide to give them one more chance that evening. At a poker game that night, a mix-up with jackets causes Steve to be accused of cheating. Later, Jerry finds out about the jackets being switched and apologizes to Steve. Jerry asks him to join the club, but Steve graciously declines. John Howard as Mr. Hargraves. John Hubbard as Ed. John Gallaudet as George Cleveland. Harold Peary as Otis Finch. Meredith MacRae as Sally Ann Morrison.
170	22	"Lady in the Air"	James V. Kern	Story by : Austin Kalish & Elroy Schwartz; Teleplay by : Austin Kalish & Irma Kalish	February 11, 1965	0182
Steve is asked to modify a plane for woman pilot Trudy Bennett (Dianne Foster), who wants to make a flight around the world. Meanwhile, Ernie tells Charley that there is a painting of him in the gallery window called "The Mean Old Grouch". Charley gets the boys to try and find out who painted it, but they can't. Trudy is happy with the way the plane turned out and Steve invites her over for dinner to celebrate. The next day she takes off on her flight. Charley finds out it was his milkman Elwood that did the painting and he's not as upset now. Trudy's plane goes missing. Steve finds out that she's stuck in New Guinea with a broken oil line. With the help of a ham radio operator, Steve tells her how to fix it. Trudy is able to complete her flight. Charley buys the painting. William Keene as Mr. Eames. George Takei has a small role as a ham radio operator.
171	23	"Hawaiian Cruise"	James V. Kern	Story by : Steve McNeil; Teleplay by : George Tibbles	February 18, 1965	0184
Steve was going to take a trip to Hawaii, but Chip gets sick and Steve decides to stay home. Everyone feels bad that Steve couldn't go on the trip and he's spending his vacation in the backyard. The family decides to surprise Steve and have a luau party in the backyard. Steve gets a call from his friend Joe (Carleton Young), who invites him to go fishing in the mountains. Charley overhears, and without ruining the surprise, tells Steve the boys have something planned for him and he should stay home. The boys decorate the backyard and get all dressed up as native Hawaiians. Steve is surprised and they have a great time until it starts to rain. Regardless, Steve says he had the best time ever. Coleen Gray as Miss Lovett. Bill Quinn as Dr. Miller. Olan Soule as Mr. Willis, Travel Clerk.
172	24	"The Teenagers"	James V. Kern	Story by : Dorothy Cooper Foote; Teleplay by : Joseph Hoffman	February 25, 1965	0190
Chip has a date with Eloise Patterson (Susan Gordon), who is a little older than he is. Chip asks Robbie's advice on how he should act. Meanwhile, Robbie is made head of the committee for decorating the school float for the Homecoming Parade. Chip's date doesn't go well and Eloise winds up dancing with an older boy. Despite being sad about how things went, when Eloise calls Chip and asks for another date, he gets all excited. Word gets out that Robbie came up with an idea for the float that seems very scandalous and lots of people are complaining. Chip's second date doesn't go well either. Eloise apologizes for leaving Chip alone on the first date, but says she only wants to be friends. Chip isn't as upset this time. Robbie's float was a success and it wasn't what people were thinking it would be. Viola Harris as Mrs. Harris. Henry Z Jones, Jr. as Pete.
173	25	"Mexico Olé"	James V. Kern	Douglas Tibbles	March 4, 1965	0162
Steve is at the home of Renaldo Romero in Mexico on business. Renaldo would like to show Steve some of the sights. But, it's been two weeks and Steve wants to get back to his family. As a surprise, Renaldo brings Steve's family to his house. Robbie falls for Renaldo's daughter Dolores. Robbie asks Dolores out on a date and Steve says he must be on his best behavior. Things are awkward at the dance because Dolores' Aunt and a boy named Filipe are there hovering over them. Filipe thinks Robbie insulted Dolores and challenges him to a duel. Instead of dueling with swords, Renaldo comes up with an unusual way for the boys to settle things. Alma Beltran as Senora Rosita Romero.
174	26	"The Fountain of Youth"	James V. Kern	Ray Brenner	March 11, 1965	0185
Charley is over worked and tired. He hears from Robbie that Margaret McSterling (Gloria Swanson) is in town to do a reading. Charley knew her from his vaudeville days on the stage and they were an item for a time. He figures in all that time she can't look as good anymore. When he goes with Robbie to the performance, he sees that she hasn't changed a bit. Margaret fails to recognize Charley and he is quite hurt. He figurines he just looks so old and she might have found the fountain of youth. Steve goes to see Margaret and she explains she didn't recognize Charley because she wasn't wearing her glasses. Margaret comes to see Charley and says she looks the way she does because she has to work at it with creams, mud packs and exercise. She says she'll make him look better and then he should rejoin show business. Margaret realizes Charley has something she never had and that's a family. Charley decides to stay the way he is and where he is.
175	27	"It's a Dog's Life"	James V. Kern	Dorothy Cooper Foote	March 18, 1965	0183
Charley wants to know who has been eating all the cookies. Mike and Sally have had a fight. Steve is to meet with British scientist Sir George Heather (Torin Thatcher) and bring him some important blueprints. However, Steve leaves the house without taking the blueprints. What no one knows is that Tramp is eating the cookies. Tramp somehow lets another dog into the house and it makes off with the blueprints. That dog brings the blueprints to Ernie, who throws them into a garbage can. Steve brings Sir George to the house to look for the prints. Meanwhile, a garbage truck picks up the garbage with the prints in them. The blueprints wind up falling out the truck and onto the street. Somehow, the other dog finds the prints and takes them. The dog brings them to Tramp, who brings them into the house. Steve finds them on the floor and is puzzled as he knows he has looked there already.
176	28	"The Sure Thing"	James V. Kern	Tom Adair & James B. Allardice	March 25, 1965	0187
Robbie is going to the racetrack with Anita, a new girl who moved into town. Her grandfather, Colonel Parker (Andy Devine), owns and trains race horses there. Uncle Charley wants to go with to meet him. Colonel Parker's horse, Leading Lady, is not running up to speed. Apparently her rabbit mascot ran away and the horse misses it. Robbie sings a song to Anita and the horse perks up. Robbie agrees to help Anita and Colonel Parker and be the horses mascot. Newspaper handicapper Bert Henderson (Sidney Clute) hears about Robbie and wants to do a story about him. Robbie doesn't want to story getting out and quits. After a talk with Steve, Robbie feels bad and heads out to the track. Even though the race has started, Robbie sings to the horse and Leading Lady wins. Bill Erwin as Steward. Stanley Clements as Johnny. Ned Glass as Muller.
177	29	"Chip, the Trapper"	James V. Kern	Joe Robert Leonard	April 1, 1965	0169
Mike and Robbie both have jobs during their vacation. Chip wishes there were something he could do. Ernie suggests that they trap animals and maybe they could make a fur coat or something. Chip builds a trap and they take it to the forest. While in the forest, Tramp gets sprayed by a skunk and runs away. Chip feels bad and decides to give up on trapping. Steve tells him not to give up just yet. Chip has a dream about being a trapper in the old west. Chip checks his trap in the woods and finds he caught a raccoon. After Steve tells Chip he would have to kill the raccoon to get the fur, Chip decides to let him go. An S.P.C.A. man finds Tramp and brings him home. Chip decides to look for gold in the local river.
178	30	"Steve and the Computer"	James V. Kern	Tom Adair & James B. Allardice	April 8, 1965	0191
The show starts off with a fantasy sequence where computers run the Douglas family's lives. Sally talks Mike into submitting their names for a computer love match program. Both she and Mike are surprised when the computer matches them up with someone else. Chip has Ernie inside a box made to look like a computer. Chip charges some local boys to have the computer answer their questions. Sally is now worried that the computer could be right. The computer picked Laura Lee Royce (Julie Parrish) for Mike. Sally wants him to go on a date with her to be sure there is nothing there. On the date, Mike finds he has a lot in common with Laura Lee, which he actually doesn't like. When he goes to tell Sally this, he finds her with the man the computer picked for her. To show Sally the computer is wrong, Mike asks Steve to submit profiles for Steve and Mom, hoping they wouldn't be paired up. But, the computer does match Steve with Mike's mom. Steve finds the solution to the problem in an old letter from Mom. Kip King as Al. Kaye Elhardt as Miss Baxter. John Pickard as Mr. Elroy.
179	31	"Tramp and the Prince"	James V. Kern	Don Grady & Gary Abrams	April 15, 1965	0192
Scared by a cat, Tramp runs away from home. Mike is in another part of town and sees a dog that he believes is Tramp. He brings him home, but the dog is acting differently. Meanwhile, wealthy Mrs. Briggs (Isobel Elsom) and her butler Potts (Burt Mustin) are looking for their dog, Prince. Prince and Tramp look alike, and when they see Tramp, they believe it to be Prince and take him home. Both families are bewildered by the personality changes of their pets. Steve tells Chip there is definitely something wrong with Tramp and they need to take him to a Veterinarian. Coincidentally, Mrs. Briggs has also gone to the Vet. Without realizing there was the initial switch, both families wind up getting their dogs back. James Griffith as Dr. Davis. Michael Whalen as Dr. Burke.
180	32	"Chip O' the Islands"	James V. Kern	Howard Merrill & Bill O'Halleren	April 22, 1965	0193
Joshua Quimby (Thomas Gomez), an old friend of Charley's from Australia, drops by. Charley always felt that Joshua was a bit of a cheat, but Joshua says he is now in a legitimate business developing land in the South Pacific. Joshua claims that a Native chief, who Charley once helped, left him some land on an island. Joshua would like to develop that land and put up a hotel for tourists. Charley, Robbie and Chip visit the tropical island that Charley's land is on. Joshua wines and dines Charley, who is starting to like the idea of developing his land. Chip and Robbie meet a young boy who explains to them that most of the natives do not want the hotel built. They believe it would destroy the friendly natives' dignity and traditional life. When Charley finds out, he sells his land to one of the natives so Quimby can't get it. Douglas Mossman as RiRi.
181	33	"The Glass Sneaker"	James V. Kern	Dorothy Cooper Foote	April 29, 1965	0176
Uncle Charley takes Chip with him when he goes to see Mr. Larkin, an old vaudevillian friend. At the hotel, Chip meets a girl named Alice Vail (Angela Cartwright). Alice says that she's in show business with her mother, Victoria Vail (Martha Stewart). Alice introduces Chip to another vaudevillian named Sammy Smaller (Billy Curtis). Sammy teaches Chip a magic trick that he performs when they go to a party in Mr. Bopper's (Vince Barnett) room. Mr. Bopper has a trained seal. Elsie Stepp (Maudie Prickett), the hotel manager, tells Mr. Bopper he must get the seal out of the hotel. Chip and Alice hide the seal in Mr. Larkin's room. It's late and Charley's in a hurry to leave, causing Chip to leave one of his shoes behind. The next day, Chip tells Steve about all the people he met and Steve has a hard time believing him. Alice and her mother bring the shoe back to Chip. Steve meets Victoria and finds out that everything Chip said was true.
182	34	"All the Weddings"	James V. Kern	John McGreevey	May 6, 1965	0188
Mike complains that Sally's mother Helen Morrison (Doris Singleton) is taking over all the wedding preparations. She set the date for two months away and has a long list of things that need to be done by then. Mike daydreams about how hard he has to work for Helen before he can marry Sally. Even Sally is getting tired of the things that have to be done. Mike suggests to Sally that they just elope. Just as they are about to go off to elope, something Steve says makes them change their minds. Then a phone call from the Reverend complicates things further. Buck Taylor as Howard Sears. Richard Reeves as Police Officer.
183	35	"The Leopard's Spots"	Tim Considine	Douglas Tibbles	May 13, 1965	0189
Sally's cousin Suzanne Boyer (Susan Seaforth Hayes) visits. Apparently, she's had trouble with her grades in three colleges. Since she is attractive, she thinks more about boys than grades. Sally tells her she needs to quit boys and study more. Uncle Charley says he can disguise her looks so men won't keep asking her out. And Robbie agrees to keep an eye on her so she keeps studying. Norman Quigley (Peter Helm), a nerdy looking boy, asks Suzanne out to a lecture. When he picks her up, she is pretty again. She winds up at a pizza place with a bunch of boys hovering around her. Robbie guilts her into going home to study. Robbie helps Norman and Suzanne get together and with Norman's help it looks as though Suzanne will get her diploma.
184	36	"Uncle Charley and the Redskins"	James V. Kern	Story by : Austin Kalish & Elroy Schwartz; Teleplay by : Austin Kalish & Elroy Schwartz & George Tibbles	May 20, 1965	0173
An Indian named Paul Owlfeather (Paul Picerni) comes to the Douglas home. He tells Charlie that their house is sitting on what was once Owanani tribal burial grounds. Paul says that he is the last Chief of his tribe. He also says that every 24 years there has to be a ceremony on the grounds. Charley sends him on his way. Mayor Hall (Hugh Sanders) now comes by with Paul and convinces Charley to allow the ceremony. Paul brings by his family and introduces them to Charlie. Charlie and Paul's mother Running Deer (Renie Riano) do not get along. Paul's family set up a camp in the back yard. Steve is away and sees a picture of the camp and Charlie in the paper. Because of an old tradition, Charlie unknowingly gets himself engaged to Running Deer. Steve comes up with a way to get Charlie off the hook. Note: Last episode on ABC and in Black and White.

=== Season 6 (1965–66) ===
Episodes now airing on CBS & filmed in color

No. overall	No. in season	Title	Directed by	Written by	Original release date	Prod. code
185	1	"The First Marriage"	James V. Kern	George Tibbles	September 16, 1965	0200
Mike and Sally are married as Tim Considine makes his last appearance on the show. Mike thanks Steve for everything before he and Sally head off to his new job out of state. Steve starts to think about getting old and tries to look up old friends. Robbie tries to assure Steve that he's not that old and should go out and make new friends, especially female ones. Back at home, the attention turns to Ernie, whose foster parents have to move to Japan, leaving Ernie at loose ends. Ernie stays at the Douglas house for a few days leaving his case worker searching for him. Robbie keeps giving Steve pick-up lines and even tries to show him some of the new dances. Ernie will have to be sent to a county home and he's worried about his dog, Wilson. Steve tells him that they will still see each other. Barbara Perry appears as Mrs. Thompson. Vera Miles appears in three episodes as Ernie's case worker, Ernestine Coulter, and Virginia Gregg appears twice as her supervisor, Mrs. Miller. Meredith MacRae makes her final appearance as Sally, Mike's wife.
186	2	"Red Tape Romance"	James V. Kern	George Tibbles	September 23, 1965	0201
With Mike & Sally married and gone, the family prepares for Ernie moving on to his new foster family. Chip asks his father if they could take Ernie in rather than a foster family. Steve is not sure it would be a good idea as Ernie and Charley don't always get along. Ernie's case worker, Ernestine Coulter, comes by to pick him up. Surprisingly, Charley is upset that Steve let Ernie go. Steve calls Ernestine about the prospect of becoming Ernie's foster home. They set up a lunch date to discuss it. Robbie continues to give Steve dating advice. Ernestine tells Steve that there could be a problem adopting Ernie as there's no woman in the house. Mrs. Miller tells Steve that they could have Ernie stay with them on a foster home trial basis. Robbie sets up another date for Steve and Ernestine.
187	3	"Brother Ernie"	James V. Kern	George Tibbles	September 30, 1965	0202
Chip and Ernie tell Charley that they got into a fight because someone called Ernie a "second hand kid". Charley asks Steve why they can't adopt Ernie. Steve reminds him that the county won't let them without a woman in the house. Robbie wonders if maybe Miss Coulter could find a loophole. Even Miss Miller doesn't think there's a way around the rules. But, later that evening, Miss Miller comes up with an idea that may work. Miss Miller, Miss Coulter, Steve and Charley talk to Judge Leland (John Gallaudet) and he believes there's a way for Ernie to be adopted. That evening, before a celebration dinner, Chip and Ernie have a fight over their dogs. When they get home, the dogs have made friends and so do Chip and Ernie. Note: "Goodnight, son" and "Goodnight, dad" are the last lines spoken by Steve and Ernie in this touching episode.
188	4	"Robbie and the Chorus Girl"	James V. Kern	Gail Ingram Clement	October 14, 1965	0195
Steve gets home late from a business trip and Uncle Charley tells him that Robbie left for a date at 11:30 p.m. Steve tells Charley not to worry because Robbie has a good head on his shoulders. Robbie is on a date with a chorus girl named Dawn O'Day (Pamela Austin). When they find out that Dawn is a chorus girl, Charley tells Steve he better have a talk with Robbie. Robbie tells Steve that he really likes her and he would like her to meet the family. Dawn comes by for dinner and everyone thinks she a nice girl. Charley, though, still has concerns about her and doesn't really trust her. He thinks she's after something. Dawn gives Steve a note saying she would like to talk to him. She tells Steve that Robbie is too nice of a boy and she doesn't want her job and where she works to be a bad influence on him. The next time Robbie comes to see Dawn, she has a guy named Danny pretend to be a boyfriend that has come back. When Robbie tells Steve, Steve doesn't say anything but knows she did it for Robbie's own good. Yale Summers appears as Phil. Arline Hunter appears as Beauty. Laurie Mitchell appears as Gala Girl.
189	5	"There's a What in the Attic?"	James V. Kern	James B. Allardice & Tom Adair	October 21, 1965	0197
Steve takes the boys to see the circus and they have a full day of entertainment. Chip and Ernie pretend to be big game hunters in the back yard. That night, while camping in the back yard, Ernie wakes up and sees a lion in the yard. Ernie wakes up Uncle Charley and tries to show him where the lion was. While he's doing this, the lion goes into the house. Charley tells Steve and Robbie and they feel it's just a bid for attention from his new family. The lion makes its way up into the attic. Hearing a noise, Ernie goes up into the attic and sees the lion. He tells Steve, who just plays along, and puts Ernie back to bed. Meanwhile, the lion goes into Steve's bedroom. Steve tries to trap the lion in various rooms but has no luck. Ernie manages to call the police and the lion trainer comes to get the lion. Ernest Anderson as Sergeant Foley. Quentin Sondergaard as Policeman.
190	6	"Office Mother"	James V. Kern	Danny Simon	October 28, 1965	0196
Chip and Ernie are playing baseball with a French boy named Pierre, who just moved into town. They tell Steve that Pierre isn't very good and won't make their team. Steve tells them that they should try and help Pierre get some experience. A distant relative of Charley's named Harriet Blanchard (an over-the-top Joan Blondell) visits. Charley tells Steve that she is all alone, misses her family and feels like she has nothing to do. She would like to find a job, but she has no real experience. The boys remind Steve what he said about Pierre and Steve agrees to try and get Harriet a job where he works. Steve talks to Dave Welch (John Howard) at the office and he makes Harriet Steve's secretary. Harriet cooks for people at the office and acts like everyone's mother. The office is in a shambles and Dave tells Steve to fire Harriet. Charley finds a way to get Harriet out of the office, but it isn't quite what Steve expected.
191	7	"Mary-Lou"	James V. Kern	John McGreevey	November 4, 1965	0194
Ernie tells Steve that Chip is crazy for Mary Lou Walker, who is one year ahead of him in school. Mary Lou, however, only has eyes for Robbie, who is older than her. Chip talks to Steve about Mary Lou, a Steve says he should try calling her and ask her on a date. When Chip calls Mary Lou to ask her out, she mistakenly believes it is Robbie and says yes. Chip decides he'll take her to a movie and Steve says he'll drive. Charley, Steve and Robbie each order a corsage for Mary Lou. Chip and Steve go to pick up Mary Lou. When Mary Lou sees it's Chip and not Robbie, she slams the door in his face. Steve knows her father, so he goes and talks to Frank (Rand Brooks) and Mary Lou. Steve finds out she was expecting Robbie. Mary Lou feels bad about the way she acted and decides to keep the date. After the date, Chip tells Steve she was nice, but he thinks she would prefer someone older. Morgan Brittany appears as Audrey.
192	8	"Monsters and Junk Like That"	James V. Kern	Frank Crow & Stanley Davis	November 11, 1965	0206
Ernie volunteers Steve for a father & son show at school. Chip tells Ernie that Steve really can't do anything, so now Ernie is worried about what they'll perform. Charley gives Ernie an idea of what they could do together. Unfortunately, Steve is supposed to be out of town that day. Charley agrees to fill in for Steve. On the day of the play, Steve changes his plans. Everyone goes to the school ahead of Steve, who is then stuck in a robot-like costume and cannot drive. After locking himself out of the house, Steve goes to a neighbors and calls for a cab, but they can't make it there in time. With the help of a Policeman (Quentin Sondergaard), Steve makes it to the show. He's a little late, but he surprises Ernie, who was expecting Uncle Charley. Joan Vohs as Mrs. King. Wayne Heffley as Harry. Kym Karath as Pammy. Stephen McEveety as Boy.
193	9	"Charley and the Dancing Lesson"	James V. Kern	Joseph Hoffman	November 18, 1965	0212
Uncle Charley provides the correct answer to a contest over the phone and wins one dance lesson. His instructor is pretty Helen Saunders (Joanna Moore), who is also skilled in lavish flattery. She talks Charley into three more lessons. Helen then talks him into life time lessons for $1000. Worried about Charley, Robbie goes to talk to Helen. She flatters him into several lessons. Steve gets a call about co-signing a loan for Charley. After finding out that both Charley and Robbie signed contracts, Steve decides to go and talk with Helen. He finds a way to get Helen to return the contracts. Charley realizes he was taken advantage of, but says it was fun while it lasted.
194	10	"My Son, the Ballerina"	James V. Kern	John McGreevey	November 25, 1965	0203
Robbie has trouble leaping the high hurdles in his Track tryouts. Cathy (Sharon Farrell), his current girlfriend, suggests he take some ballet to improve his coordination. Though embarrassed at the idea, Robbie goes to a class with Cathy. Meanwhile, Ernie pretends to be a spy like James Bond. Robbie takes several ballet lessons and now Madam Irina (Jeanette Nolan) expects him to perform at a recital. The lessons help and in his next tryout he makes the team. He tells Cathy he won't be taking any more lessons and won't be in the recital. Ernie tells Steve that Robbie has been taking ballet lessons. Steve talks to Madam Irina and then talks to Robbie. Robbie performs at the recital. William Boyett as Coach
195	11	"The Ernie Report"	James V. Kern	Dorothy Cooper Foote	December 2, 1965	0208
Every time Ernie makes plans with a member of the family, a girl or woman winds up getting in the way. Even Tramp has a girlfriend. Ernie asks Steve what is it that makes boys do goofy things when girls are involved. He wants to know if it will happen to him. At the soda shop, a young girl named Linda Lou starts sweet talking to Ernie. He winds up buying her an ice cream. Linda Lou calls and invites Ernie to her birthday party. Ernie feels out of place at the party and Linda Lou throws him over for a boy named Pete. When Ernie comes home depressed, Steve gets the rest of the family to cheer him up. Barbara Knudson as Linda Lou's Mother.
196	12	"The Hong Kong Story"	James V. Kern	George Tibbles	December 9, 1965	0209
Steve has to fly to Hong Kong for business, so he decides to take the entire family for a vacation. Everyone is excited except for Charley. Apparently he knew a girl there named Lucy (Frances Fong) and became quite fond of her. He doesn't want to bring back all those memories. Steve says he has to go as he might run into Lucy. After arriving, the family stays with Clive Atherton (Maurice Dallimore), a business associate. Charley is now excited about possibly finding Lucy. But when he actually sees her, he's afraid to talk to her. Charley thinks she looks the same and he is so old looking. Clive throws a formal party and has Charley dress in Naval Dress Whites. Clive also arranges for Lucy to be at the party and she recognizes Charley right away. They have a nice evening together. George Takei has a bit part in this episode as Won Tsun. Nancy Hsueh as Lo An.
197	13	"Marriage and Stuff"	James V. Kern	Dorothy Cooper Foote	December 16, 1965	0216
Steve brings home a Margie Milford (Chris Noel) and they are surprised to find an empty house. (Flashback to earlier.) Charley overhears Steve on the phone arranging a marriage. Robbie sees him at the jewelry store with a woman who gives him a kiss. Chip and Ernie see Steve coming out of a church with a woman. More coincidences occur, all pointing to Steve getting married. Robbie finds out Margie's name and address and goes to see her. After talking with her, he is even more convinced Steve is marrying her. To not disrupt Steve's new life, Charley plans to go back to sea. Robbie decides to move to a dorm. Mike and Sally say that Chip and Ernie can live with them in Arizona. (Back to the present.) Steve gets a call from Mike and learns that the family are all leaving. Steve finds everyone at the airport restaurant. He explains that Margie is marrying a Jim Johnson and he was just helping them with the arrangements.
198	14	"Douglas A Go-Go"	James V. Kern	Austin and Irma Kalish	December 23, 1965	0205
Robbie tells Chip that teenage parties are the best. Chip asks Steve if he could throw his own party, with girls. Ernie is not invited since he is too young. Steve starts to get phone calls from mothers worried about their daughters going to the party. A Mrs. Hargrove (Jean Engstrom) even comes to Steve's office to voice her concerns. It's the night of the party and everything starts off fine. But after a while the record player breaks and there's no more music. Ernie comes up with a way to stop the party from breaking up. Steve, Robbie, Ernie and Charley provide the music. John Howard as Dave Welch.
199	15	"Charley the Pigeon"	James V. Kern	Story by : Ray Brenner; Teleplay by : Ray Brenner & Joseph Hoffman	December 30, 1965	0218
Steve has to go away for a business trip. He gives Robbie $50 to pick up his golf clubs. Robbie goes to the Golf shop and finds it's closed for lunch. To kill some time, Robbie goes to a pool hall. There he meets Carol and Donna (Quinn O'Hara). They act naive about how to play the game and ask Robbie to show them how. Turns out they are pool sharks and win all of Robbie's money. Robbie confesses to Charlie what happened. Charley plays pool shark and wins the money back. Booth Colman as Kramer.
200	16	"What About Harry?"	James V. Kern	Cynthia Lindsay	January 6, 1966	0207
Ernie leaves the door open when he goes to a friends house. A large shaggy dog wanders into the house and takes an instant liking to Steve. Steve manages to get the dog out, but then it just howls by the door. Steve lets the dog back in until he can figure out what to do with him. The next day, Steve says he'll put an ad in the paper about the dog. The boys name the dog Harry (after Harry Bailey from It's a Wonderful Life). Linda Allen (Linda Watkins) comes by and says she will find a home for Harry. When Steve comes home, he says he will go get the dog and find its owner. Steve goes to Linda Allen's home and speaks with her niece Phyllis (Lee Meriwether) and Linda. He brings the dog home, and it still howls whenever Steve leaves. Mr. Franklin (Gil Lamb), a rummage collector, comes by and Harry takes a liking to him and leaves with him. Steve is a little sad that Harry doesn't need him anymore.
201	17	"From Maggie with Love"	James V. Kern	Bill O'Hallaren	January 13, 1966	0213
Maggie Bellini (Dana Wynter), a wealthy businesswoman, promises to match the money that Bryant Park raises to build an art center. She meets the Douglas family and is interested in Steve. Wherever Steve and Maggie go, she is recognized. She also starts giving gifts to the other family members. Maggie even sends her chef, butler and maid to the Douglas house. Steve takes Maggie out to dinner and says that the family cannot accept her gifts. Maggie realizes that her jet-set lifestyle is not for Steve. Noel Drayton as Miggins. Jonathan Goldsmith as Photographer.
202	18	"Robbie and the Slave Girl"	James V. Kern	John McGreevey	January 20, 1966	0214
Robbie saves Terry Wong (Irene Tsu) from getting hit by a car. Terry tells Robbie that according to Chinese custom, she must do everything for him now. Meanwhile, Steve and Ernie visit Ray Wong (Benson Fong) and his wife Alice (Beulah Quo) to pick up some blueprints. Ray gives Ernie a Chinese lucky cricket. Ernie embraces the Chinese lifestyle. The next day, Terry shows up to the Douglas house and proceeds to be Robbie's slave girl. He enjoys the attention at first, but it soon becomes awkward. Robbie tells Steve about Terry, who happens to be Ray's cousin, and he wants to know what to do. Steve says he'll ask Ray for help. Ray has Terry speak to Grandpa Wong, who makes her see things in a different light. Sherry Alberoni as Ruth. Hank Jones as 1st Student.
203	19	"Steve and the Huntress"	James V. Kern	Dorothy Cooper Foote	January 27, 1966	0198
Robbie meets Eleanor Evans (Terry Moore) when her car runs out of gas and he offers to get her some. Eleanor stops by the Douglas house, because she forgot to pay Robbie for the gas. The family meets her and she is invited for dinner. They find out that Eleanor has been exploring in Africa. That night Ernie dreams that he and Steve go exploring in the jungle. While she is still in town, Steve and Eleanor go out on several dates. Eleanor is leaving for Africa again and she asks Steve if he would like to go with. Despite the boys insisting he go, Steve declines the offer. Eleanor says she understands and hopefully one day they will see each other again.
204	20	"Robbie the College Man"	James V. Kern	Joseph Hoffman	February 3, 1966	0199
Robbie is going to college and he gets a job at a sorority house. He asks Steve if it's OK to move into the dorm at college with his friend Bert Parker (After Bert the Cop from It's a Wonderful Life) (Tim Rooney). Steve thinks it's an added expense considering they live 5 minutes from the campus, but Robbie gets to do it. Between his job and having different schedules with Bert, Robbie starts to realize that dorm life is difficult for him. The family at various times drops in on Robbie to see how he's doing. Steve gets a call and Robbie asks that the family stop coming around. Steve and Charlie find out from Bert that Robbie is actually home sick. Before Steve can come up with a way to get Robbie home, Robbie moves back. Barbara Pepper as Mrs. Brand. Hank Jones as Art.
205	21	"Whatever Happened to Baby Chip?"	James V. Kern	Story by : Doug Tibbles; Teleplay by : Doug Tibbles & Gail Ingram Clement	February 10, 1966	0220
Steve is coming back from a six week trip. During that time Chip was letting his hair grow long, so Charley sends him to get a hair cut. Chip's friend Jeff Welch (Jay North) convinces Chip to not get his hair cut short. Steve is surprised when he sees Chip, but doesn't say anything about his hair. Steve tells Charley that Chip is just going through a phase. At the office, Dave Welch tells Steve that he consulted psychologist Dr. Clark (Ivan Bonar) about Jeffs long hair. Chip has now dyed his hair blonde. He did it because all the guys in a club he wants to get into are growing their hair. There are also some pranks to be done as part of the initiation. It's not long before Chip decides he doesn't want to just follow the crowd. Harold Peary as Joe. Charles Herbert as Ed. Michael Rupert as John.
206	22	"Robbie and the Little Stranger"	James V. Kern	James B. Allardice & Tom Adair	February 17, 1966	0225
Robbie lets Steve know that he is going steady with Joanne Edwards (Tina Cole), who he met a couple weeks ago. He also says that even though they are in love, they will finish school before getting married. Robbie finds out that an old friend of his, Borden Gray (Hal Stalmaster), is married and has a child. Borden tells Robbie that he has no trouble juggling married life and school. Borden and his wife Eileen had plans for the weekend. When Borden's babysitter cancels, Robbie volunteers to watch little Jimmy. Robbie and Joanne find babysitting and possibly married life isn't as easy as they thought it would be and they start to fight. Robbie brings the baby home and realizes he's too young to be married.
207	23	"Call Her Max"	James V. Kern	James B. Allardice & Tom Adair	February 24, 1966	0211
Steve is to interview a female engineer named Maxine Bentley (Kipp Hamilton) for a new project. She shows up in dirty overalls and tells Steve to call her Max. Georgie Potter (Terry Burnham), a female student, signs up for the boys' track team at school. Chip and the other boys let her try out as they figure she won't be good enough anyway. Georgie winds up being faster than any of the boys and makes the team. Ernie suggests to Chip that he go out for the girls' field hockey team. That would show them that girls should play with girls and boys with boys. Chip makes the team, but has to wear a girls' uniform. Plus he gets roughed up at the first practice. Georgie tells Chip that she's quitting track and Chip says he'll quit hockey. Maura McGiveney as Gladys. Kaye Elhardt as Katherine. Seymour Cassel as Coach Gregson.
208	24	"Kid Brother Blues"	James V. Kern	John McGreevey	March 3, 1966	0217
Robbie is on a date with Charlene Wilson and having dinner at her house. Turns out that Chip is friends with her younger brother Tim (Donald Losby). They are at the house as well and they keep annoying Robbie and Charlene. Later, Chip has a date with Shelly Parkhurst (Susan Gordon) and goes over to her house. Robbie comes up with an idea to teach Chip a lesson. He sends Ernie over to play with Shelly's younger brother and get in Chip and Shelly's way. Chip complains to Steve and Steve reminds him that he did the same thing to Robbie. Ernie tells Chip that it was Robbie's idea to have him go to Shelly's house. Chip gets back at Robbie one more time before the brothers come to a truce. Steve has a date with Helen Logan (Elaine Devry). She has two extra tickets to the event she and Steve were going to and offers them to her niece, Norma Sue. Turns out Norma Sue's date for the night is Robbie.
209	25	"Robbie's Double Date" "Robbie's Double Life"	James V. Kern	Doug Tibbles	March 10, 1966	0204
Uncle Charley tells Steve that Robbie is going steady with Mary Sue Carver (Lori Martin) and Rebecca Martin. Steve talks to Robbie, but Robbie says he can handle it as one girl goes to high school and the other goes to college. Robbie believes that they could never run into each other. Meanwhile, Chip gets Ernie to do a lot of his work so that Ernie can earn Chips train set. Mary Sue and Rebecca do run into each other and find out they are both seeing Robbie. They come up with a plan to teach Robbie a lesson. The girls have Robbie juggling a date with each of them on the same night.
210	26	"Our Boy in Washington"	James V. Kern	Austin and Irma Kalish	March 17, 1966	0224
After learning about the Statue of Liberty in school, Ernie decides to write a thank you letter to the French Ambassador in Washington DC. The Ambassador (Maurice Marsac) calls and speaks to Ernie, and invites the Douglas family to visit in Washington. No one believes that Ernie really spoke to the Ambassador. Then Ernie receives airlines tickets to Washington. At first, the rest of the family all have reasons not to go but then Steve decides that it's too important to Ernie. The Ambassador and Ernie try to find things to keep the family entertained. At a dinner party given by the Ambassador, the family makes some new friends and Steve even makes a business deal. Susan Silo as Janine. Tol Avery as Paul McGiveney.
211	27	"Ernie and That Woman"	James V. Kern	John McGreevey	March 24, 1966	0215
Fourth-grader Ernie becomes friends with a sixth-grade girl named Melissa. It seems they have stamp collecting in common. Chip tells Ernie to be careful, as he thinks Melissa might be after something. Apparently Chip was taken advantage of once by Melissa. Chip confronts Melissa and says that she should stop seeing Ernie. Meanwhile, Robbie is working on a school project but he has girls do all the work. Melissa tricks Ernie into giving her a colorful exotic stamp from his album. Once she has the stamp she wants, the friendship is over. Chip finds a way to get Ernie's stamp back from Melissa.
212	28	"The State vs. Chip Douglas"	James V. Kern	Leo and Pauline Townsend	March 31, 1966	0222
Ernie notices that a rare coin in his collection is missing and accuses Chip of using it to pay for a postage due. Chip insists that he knows what the rare coin looks like and he didn't take it. Ernie is mad because he thinks everyone is taking Chips side. An impromptu trial is held with a jury of the boys friends. While the jury is deliberating, Ernie finds the coin in his room and realizes Chip was innocent all along. Ernie tells Steve he found the coin and Steve says they need to go tell Chip. Before they can do that the jury comes back and Chip is acquitted. Ernie thinks Chip will be really mad at him when he finds out about the coin, but Chip isn't. Flip Mark as Fitzgibbons. Charles Herbert as Ralph.
213	29	"A Hunk of Hardware"	James V. Kern	Gail Ingram Clement	April 7, 1966	0210
Steve comes home with a trophy he won at a golf outing and sets it on the trophy mantle. Ernie realizes the every member of the family has a trophy except him. Even Tramp has a trophy. Ernie decides to try and win one at an upcoming track meet, but he comes in last. He tells Steve that he's a born loser and he'll understand if they don't want him in the family anymore. Robbie and Chip stage a race that will guarantee Ernie wins and he brings home a giant trophy. Steve knows that Robbie and Chip meant well, but he feels he has to tell Ernie the truth. Ernie does eventually win a trophy on his own. Stephen McEveety as a Boy.
214	30	"The Wrong Robbie"	James V. Kern	George Tibbles	April 14, 1966	0221
A lot of people at school seem to be mad at Robbie, and he doesn't know why. Robbie is trying to figure out who or what is behind it, but he keeps coming up empty. Then he spots another student named Douglas Frasier who looks exactly like him. Douglas even admits that he is the one causing all the trouble. Robbie's plan to talk and dress like Doug and get him in trouble backfires. Both boys are brought before the Dean of Men (Walter Reed). Douglas tells the Dean that he got Robbie in trouble for the fun of it. In the end, they find out why Douglas rebels the way he does. Mike Minor provided the deep voice of Robbie's mischievous doppelgänger. Fredd Wayne as Dr. Killebrew. Sarah Selby as Dean of Women. Eve McVeagh as Clara Frasier. Melinda Casey as Julie.
215	31	"The Wheels"	James V. Kern	John McGreevey	April 21, 1966	0223
To impress campus queen Linda June Mitchell (Sherry Jackson), Robbie lets her drive his car. She winds up getting a ticket for going through a red light. So Linda June's dad doesn't ground her, Robbie offers to pay the ticket. With Steve out of town, Robbie borrows the $16 for the ticket from Uncle Charley. Charley will give him the money, but to teach Robbie to be more responsible, he won't be able to use his car for a week. Robbie is now afraid that he will lose Linda June to Brad Parmenter, who has a fancy new car. Though she's hesitant at first, Robbie convinces Linda to let him walk her home. They actually both have a very nice time. Robbie and Linda June soon discover that dating without a car can be as equally fun as driving.
216	32	"London Memories"	James V. Kern	George Tibbles	April 28, 1966	0219
The family has returned from London and since then Steve has been acting depressed. Robbie has a talk with Steve and suggests that he is under too much pressure at work. This goes on for a while and the family keeps trying to figure out what's wrong with Steve. Chip finds a picture of Louise Allen (Anna Lee), a beautiful widow that Steve met in London. Steve spent a lot of time with her and became quite fond of Louise. Chip realizes Steve's sad mood is because he misses her. Chip gives Steve some advice that actually makes Steve feel better. Nora Marlowe as Mrs. Carsten. Ben Wright as Sir Walter Marsden.

=== Season 7 (1966–67) ===
No. overall	No. in season	Title	Directed by	Written by	Original release date	Prod. code
217	1	"Stag at Bay"	James V. Kern	Elroy Schwartz	September 15, 1966	0229
Steve attends a bachelor party for older co-worker Fergie (William Keene) and is expecting just a simple dinner. However, a girl dancer named Flame LaRose (Leslie Parrish) was hired. Just as Steve and Dave Welch (John Howard) want to leave, the party is raided by the police. Steve reluctantly helps Flame slip out the back and takes her to her hotel. When Steve finds out that Flame can't get into her room because she owes the hotel money, he takes her home. There he learns that her real name is Margaret Smith and he gives her money. Ernie sees her and the next morning Steve has to explain what happened. Margaret comes by to thank Steve for his help and tells him that she is going to straighten her life out. Gil Lamb as Tom.
218	2	"Fly Away Home"	James V. Kern	James B. Allardice & Gail Ingram	September 22, 1966	0235
Steve is preparing to fly to Kansas City for a business trip. He realizes he could drive and take time to stop at the town where he grew up. Steve decides to take the whole family on the trip with him. While visiting the house he grew up in, Steve runs into old friend Betty Reynolds (Ann McCrea), who lives there now. Chip and Ernie wander around town asking people if they remember Steve. Steve dines with his old girlfriend Ellen Kiefer (Virginia Grey), her surly husband Ed (Dave Willock) and their obnoxious children in their messy house. Charles Herbert as Eddie. Burt Mustin as Elderly Man. Percy Helton as Second Man. Irene Tedrow as Mrs. Travers. Pamelyn Ferdin as Roseann. Note: Mike is referred to by name for the last time in the series.
219	3	"Forget Me Not"	James V. Kern	Joseph Hoffman	September 29, 1966	0233
Steve gets a letter from Florence Glendenny (Joan Caulfield) who he supposedly dated a long time ago who says she'll be in town and would like to get together. She appears to remember an awful lot about Steve including his likes and dislikes, and keeps calling him Stevie. On the other hand, try as he might, Steve does not remember her at all. Florence mentions that she is a widower and she wonders what life would've been like had she married Steve. After a few dates, Florence tells Steve the reason she came to town was to decide if she will marry a man named Howard or marry Steve. A panicked Steve is about to tell Florence that he doesn't remember her, when she says she's decided to marry Howard. Florence tells Steve that she hopes he'll be able to forget her.
220	4	"Good Guys Finish Last"	James V. Kern	Henry Garson & Edmund Beloin	October 6, 1966	0242
The Father and Son dinner at the Junior High is coming up. Dave Welch suggests as after dinner entertainment a Father and Son quiz show. Dave, Steve and Ray Wong (Benson Fong) are to compete against theirs sons Chip, Dave Welch Jr. (Jay North) and Preston. The sons easily beat the fathers. Mr. Reynolds (John Hubbard) from the local TV station heard about the quiz and would like to televise a rematch. The fathers decide that they need to study so as not to be embarrassed again. Because they are confident that they will win, the boys decide to lose on purpose so the fathers won't look bad on TV. During the quiz, Steve begins to suspect that the boys are letting the fathers win. During a break, Steve tells the boys to play to win and that's what they do. Joan Vohs as Miss Terry.
221	5	"Arrivederci Robbie"	James V. Kern	John McGreevey	October 13, 1966	0232
Robbie's friend Joe invites him to a family party to meet his cousin Nina from Italy. Not quite familiar with the Italian customs, Robbie finds himself engaged, after walking Nina through a park unchaperoned. Meanwhile, Chip goes through a rigorous initiation for a secret society only to learn that there is no secret society. His friend Floyd (Donald Losby) pulled a prank on him. Joe's father Vincenzo Marino (Jay Novello) comes over to speak with Steve and Robbie. Vincenzo says it's a matter of family honor and Steve says that the choice should be made by Robbie and Nina. Vincenzo gets a call telling him that Nina has run off because she doesn't want to marry Robbie. Nina finds a way to stay in the country without getting married. Renata Vanni as Anna.
222	6	"If at First"	James V. Kern	Edmund Beloin & Henry Garson	October 20, 1966	0226
Steve is getting a parking ticket from meter maid Vickie Malone (Yvonne Craig). Turns out Vickie and Robbie go to school together and she is coming over for dinner that night. Despite that, she gives Steve a second ticket for having an expired license. When he goes to renew his license, Steve fails the written test. Robbie lends Steve a driving manual to study. Steve fails the test a second time. Chip and Ernie try to cheer Steve up. Robbie tells Steve that he flunked the second time because he gave Steve an old manual. Steve is happy because his sons still like and respect him even though he failed. Kathryn Minner as Old Lady.
223	7	"Robbie's Underground Movie"	James V. Kern	John McGreevey	November 3, 1966	0230
Robbie and Gina Rose (Linda Foster) are taking a cinema class together. Robbie is having a hard time understanding the very avant garde films the classmates are making. Robbie and Gina Rose decide to make a movie together and use the Douglas family as their subject. They will film all the dull conformities that go on in the house and then film Gina Rose as the interesting part of life. While editing the film, Robbie realizes that all the scenes with Gina are really bad and need to be cut. Robbie asks Steve how should he tell Gina and Steve tells him to just be honest. Everyone in the class really likes the family film, except Gina Rose, of course. Johnny Washbrook as Davidson. Paul Sorensen as Policeman.
224	8	"Fiddler Under the Roof"	James V. Kern	Austin & Irma Kalish	November 10, 1966	0248
For entertainment, the family decides to play music together. Everyone has an instrument to play, except for Ernie. Steve and Charley feel bad that Ernie is left out. Charley decides to teach Ernie how to play the violin. After two months, Ernie shows no improvement. Charley then takes Ernie to Professor Lombardi (Leon Belasco), a professional violin teacher. Things don't go any better there. To cheer Ernie up, Chip sets up a recital and makes sure the kids know to applaud a lot. Ernie finds out the kids were told to applaud and feels even worse. Steve finds a way to make Ernie feel better. Jerry Hausner as Mr. Sprankle.
225	9	"Happy Birthday, World"	James V. Kern	John McGreevey	November 17, 1966	0247
Steve is away on a business trip but wants to be home by the 12th as that is his birthday. Robbie decides to earn extra money by starting a birthday cake delivery service at his college. When he starts to get overwhelmed with orders, Robbie asks Chip and Ernie to help make deliveries. Charlie says that he can bake the cakes for less money, but things get too busy for him as well. Steve comes home and is confronted by Mr. Rhodes (Richard Bull) from the Health Department. Steve learns that Robbie has hired employees and a lawyer for his business. Meanwhile the family has forgotten Steve's own birthday. Things get out of hand, there's a cake and pie tossing fight in the Douglas' kitchen, and Robbie decides to give up the business. Brenda Benet as Elyse Haines. Carleton Young as Mr. Haines. Mimi Gibson as Carol.
226	10	"The Awkward Age"	James V. Kern	Joseph Hoffman	December 1, 1966	0252
Robbie isn't doing well in his chemistry class and hires a tutor recommended by his professor, Terrence Baker (Robert Brubaker). The tutor turns out to be a beautiful older woman named Jeri Harper (Susan Oliver). Jeri is out on a date with Don Lennox (Laurence Haddon) and winds up meeting Steve. Steve tells Robbie that he has a date with Jeri, even though she is a little younger. Robbie doesn't say anything, but he is not happy because he is attracted to Jeri, despite her being a little older. Steve is stuck at the office and asks Robbie to fill in for his date with Jeri. Robbie asks Jeri how she feels about people marrying despite differences in age. Jeri mentions this to Steve as she thought Robbie meant she and Steve getting married. Both Steve and Robbie decide to not see Jerri anymore.
227	11	"A Real Nice Time"	James V. Kern	Elroy Schwartz	December 8, 1966	0240
Chip wins a date with teen movie star Nan Summers (Sherry Alberoni), thanks to Ernie, who had requested a photo of her as a birthday present for Chip. The perky actress comes to the Douglas's house with the studio's publicity man Bob Jonley (Tommy Noonan). They take a lot of pictures where Chip has to look excited to meet her. Later, when Nan arrives for the date, Bob brings along the camera man and a noisy group of fans. Chip becomes disenchanted by all the attention she is getting and doesn't really have a good time on the date. The next day Nan comes to the house by herself. She tells Chip that she knows he didn't have any fun on the date and would he like to do something with her now. Chip has a great time with Nan and tells the family what a really nice girl she is.
228	12	"A Falling Star"	James V. Kern	Story by : Dorothy Cooper Foote; Teleplay by : Dorothy Cooper Foote & Joseph Hoffman	December 15, 1966	0256
While on a business trip, Steve and Dave Welch go to see a lounge singer named Claudia Farrell (Jaye P. Morgan). Steve and Dave are old fans of hers and are surprised how small the audience is. Claudia tells Steve that the club is letting her go because her style of music just isn't popular anymore. Steve talks her into coming to Bryant Park to learn a hipper music style from Robbie's band. At first Robbie is not thrilled with the idea, but he agrees to work with her. The band invites her onstage at their next gig. The kids in the audience are skeptical at first, but soon dig the new singer.
229	13	"Tramp or Ernie"	James V. Kern	Gail Ingram Clement	December 22, 1966	0228
Ernie learns that the person with the least seniority at his father's company has been laid off. Steve says that it is unfortunate, but that is just how it goes sometimes. After sneezing all day, the family thinks that Ernie may be allergic to Tramp. Steve takes Ernie to see Dr. Parker (Bill Quinn), who confirms Ernie's allergy. Because Tramp has seniority with the family, Ernie decides to leave home. Ernie sees Mrs. Willis (Shirley O'Hara) at the Family Service Center hoping to find a new family to adopt him. Steve tells Ernie there's no seniority when it comes to family and they'll work something out.
230	14	"Grandma's Girl"	James V. Kern	Dorothy Cooper Foote	December 29, 1966	0234
It seems everyone in the family can pick up the phone and get a date, except Chip. Chip wants to take Gail, a girl from school, to a party but her old-fashioned Grandma (Jeanette Nolan) thinks she's too young to date. Charley rents a horse and buggy for Chip when they learn Grandma doesn't think cars are safe. Chip comes by and visits with Grandma but finds that once he stirs up her old memories, it's not going to be easy to get out of the house. Chip calls up Charley and hints that he come by and help. Charley drops by, spends time with Grandma, and Chip and Gail go to the party. Terry Burnham plays the girl, Gail McGee, the granddaughter and Chip's interest.
231	15	"You Saw a What?"	James V. Kern	Story by : James Allardice; Teleplay by : Eugene Thompson & Joseph Hoffman	January 5, 1967	0250
Ernie's excited reports of seeing a flying saucer are received with skepticism. The next day he not only sees the weird vehicle again, but he snaps some pictures of it. After Steve gets them developed, he immediately takes the photos to the government. Gen. Carstairs (Alan Baxter) explains that what Ernie saw was a new top secret Air Force project that had a malfunction. Carstairs would like Steve to tell Ernie that there is nothing on the pictures as they want the project kept quiet. Steve wants to tell Ernie the truth and explain that he can't say anything about the project. Meanwhile, Ernie had made plans to go on TV and show the pictures. Ernie does the TV interview with Jim King (Del Moore). Ernie tells Jim that the pictures didn't turn out, but he saw a flying saucer with little green men inside. Ernie gets teased at school, but he knows he did the right thing.
232	16	"Both Your Houses"	James V. Kern	John McGreevey	January 12, 1967	0251
A new family moves in next door to the Douglases. A widowed mother and her three children, plus Aunt Maude. It's not long before the Douglas family members are at odds with their next-door-neighbor counterparts. However, Robbie is delighted when he finds out that college classmate Peggy has moved in next door. The pair immediately go to work on a joint assignment for their Shakespeare class. Robbie plays Romeo to her Juliet when a feud between the two families seems imminent. The two families believe that Robbie and Peggy may have eloped. But in fact the two set Shakespearean dialog into modern songs and play them for the families. Jackie DeShannon, Kevin Corcoran, Constance Moore and Elvia Allman play the neighbors in this episode.
233	17	"My Pal Dad"	James V. Kern	Phil Leslie	January 19, 1967	0254
Steve and Robbie each make plans for Saturday. They both forget that trout season starts then, which means it's time for their annual fishing trip together. Charley reminds Steve about the fishing. Robbie hates fishing, but can't bring himself to tell his dad, who loves it. Meanwhile, Ernie would love to go along. Steve tells him his chance will come some time in the future. Robbie and Chip talk about how much each of them hate fishing. A reluctant Robbie goes on the trip and Ernie learns that he is considered a true Douglas family member because he can wait his turn.
234	18	"TV or Not TV"	James V. Kern	John McGreevey	January 26, 1967	0257
Steve is away at a seminar. Robbie tells the family that he is producing a TV show at college. The current shows are not doing well, so they need to come up with something better. At a meeting about the shows, a cynical Vanessa Harrington (Jenny Maxwell) suggests doing a show with more reality to it. Meanwhile, after Chip and Ernie argue about what to watch, Charley bans TV for one week. As the days go by, Charley starts to have second thoughts about the TV ban. The family reality show that Vanessa wrote is a flop with viewers. Robbie tells Vanessa that if the show is what her family is really like, he feels sorry for her. Johnny Washbrook as Ferris.
235	19	"My Dad, the Athlete"	James V. Kern	Ray Singer	February 2, 1967	0253
Ernie's friends brag about what great athletes their fathers are, and agree to compare sports trophies. The only trophy Ernie can find is one Steve got for debating. The boys decide that the fathers will compete in a 2-mile cross country race on Saturday. Steve tells Ernie that he won't race. Joe Linden (Herbert Anderson) tells Steve that he doesn't want to race either, but his son really expects him to. Ernie finally talks Steve into running. The fathers get together to discuss the race. As they are all out of shape, they come up with a plan to make it look as though they ran the whole race. But, the boys throw a wrench in the plan when they decide to ride along on their bikes. Ernie understands when Steve lets Joe win the race since his son needs the boost in self esteem more than Ernie. Bill Zuckert as Harry McCracken.
236	20	"The Good Earth"	James V. Kern	Tom Adair & John Elliotte	February 9, 1967	0245
The family has been doing things for Uncle Charley and he would like to do something for them. He sees an add in the paper for a vacation lot a new real estate development. When the family drives up to see the lot that Charley bought, they realize that nothing has been built yet. They wander around the forest and open land and Charlie twists his ankle. Robbie finds what they believe is Charley's lot, and surprisingly, it has an old cabin on it. Turns out it's belongs to Jesse Prouty (Doodles Weaver) and his country family and Charley's lot is next to it. Charley signed a contract, but Steve finds a way to get out of it. Herb Vigran as Caretaker. Kaye Elhardt as Receptionist.
237	21	"My Son, the Bullfighter"	James V. Kern	Elroy Schwartz	February 16, 1967	0255
Robbie's Spanish class is introduced to Manuello (Alejandro Rey), a bullfighter. Robbie becomes jealous when his girlfriend Gretchen Williams (Heather North) is infatuated with Manuello. Gretchen, Robbie and Manuello go to a farm to see a bull. Robbie tries to impress Gretchen by confronting the killer bull with no knowledge about the sport whatsoever. When the bull charges at him, Robbie runs away. Word gets around about what happened and Robbie is embarrassed. After practicing at home and to prove he is not a coward, Robbie goes back to the farm. What he does not know is that this time he is trying out his skills on the farmer's pet bull, who is tame, completely harmless and uninterested. But, Robbie walks away with an air of courage and confidence. Walter Sande as Art. William Boyett as Cowboy.
238	22	"The Best Man"	James V. Kern & James Sheldon	Edmund Beloin & Henry Garson	February 23, 1967	0227
Robbie prepares to ask exchange student Denise Dubose (Marianna Hill), who he has fallen in love with, to marry him. Robbie tells his teacher and friend Tom Hayden that Steve has found a part time job for him. Just as Robbie is about to ask Denise, she tells him that Tom popped the question the night before, and she accepted. Tom asks Robbie to be best man at the wedding. Without Robbie knowing, the Douglas home will host the wedding and Steve will give the bride away. The day of the wedding Robbie has a talk with Denise. He wants to know if he had asked first, would she have said yes to him. Denise tells Robbie that she loves him, but as a brother. Robbie feels better knowing that Tom did not steal Denise away from him.
239	23	"Now, in My Day"	James V. Kern & James Sheldon	Story by : Doug Tibbles; Teleplay by : Gail Ingram Clement & Doug Tibbles	March 2, 1967	0249
Chip has been going steady with Debbie Martin. Chip's class is having a school dance with a 1930s theme. The boy students are supposed to bring their mother and the girls their father. Chip's friend Frank is dating Marcia Billings (Susan Gordon) who does not have a father. Chip and Frank come up with the plan to have Chip go with Marcia's mother, Nancy Billings (Mary LaRoche), and Marcia to go with Steve. Problems arise when Chip has a few dances with Marcia and they start to like each other. Chip tells Frank that he will not see Marcia again. But, they get thrown together when Nancy comes over to discuss another class dance with Steve. At the next dance, Chip winds up with Marcia and Frank winds up with Debbie. Sidney Clute as Milt. Marcia Mae Jones as Vera Billings.
240	24	"Melinda"	James V. Kern & James Sheldon	Joseph Hoffman	March 9, 1967	0241
Steve would like to take out Natalie Hendricks (Coleen Gray), who has a teenage daughter, Melinda (Morgan Brittany). Steve asks Chip to go on a double date with Melinda. Afterwards, Chip tells Ernie that Melinda was kind of "spooky". Chip is supposed to go to the dance with Geraldine. But, pushy Melinda tells Chip that the two of them are going steady and he is taking her. Chip pretends to get along with her, so that Steve has an easier time when dating Natalie. Natalie calls Steve and tells him she thinks Chip and Melinda are to young to go steady. Knowing it will break Chip's heart, Steve still tells him he should not go out with Melinda. A thrilled Chip explains to Steve why he was putting up with Melinda.
241	25	"Charley O' the Seven Seas"	James V. Kern & James Sheldon	Joseph Hoffman	March 16, 1967	0244
Ernie's teacher, Verna Benson (Jan Clayton), treats him like a teacher's pet and Ernie does not like it. Because Steve is out of town, Ernie hopes that Charley can find a way for Miss Benson to be mad at him. Ernie had earlier written a report about all of Charlie's seaman stories. When Charlie goes to see Verna, they wind up talking about his travels and not Ernie. Charlie agrees to tell his seafaring stories to a group of teachers and he exaggerates a bit. Verna tells Charley that she quit her job and asks him to marry her and travel to Pango Pango. Charley lets her know that he cannot do it because of the Douglas family. Because it is the chance of a lifetime for her, Verna decides to go by herself. She thanks Charley for the inspiration. Lillian Bronson as Mrs. Benson.
242	26	"Help, the Gypsies Are Coming!"	James V. Kern & James Sheldon	Cynthia Lindsay	March 23, 1967	0238
Ernie's new schoolmate Lazlo is a gypsy whose family lives in a camp outside of town. Ernie invites Lazlo over for dinner. When Lazlo arrives, he brings along his father, Boris Chaputnik (Kurt Kasznar), and grandmother, Madame Olga. Boris and Olga accept the Douglas family into their tribe. The Gypsy tribe then camps out on the Douglas lawn. After Lazlo thanks Steve, Steve decides to let them stay the night. When Steve comes home from work the next day, many things are missing from the house. The Gypsies come back with everything they had taken. Turns out they were just repairing the items. Steve feels bad for doubting the Gypsies, but Boris forgives him. Stuart Nisbet as Policeman.
243	27	"Ernie's Folly"	James V. Kern & James Sheldon	Austin and Irma Kalish	March 30, 1967	0231
Ernie has to come up with a project for the school science fair and is counting on Steve's help. Ernie is disappointed when Steve refuses to help him. He decides to make a battery powered clock. Ernie thinks he's finish the clock, but it doesn't work. Steve tells him to stick with it. At the science fair one can tell that all the other kids had their parents help them. Even though his clock didn't work, Ernie was the only one that could explain how it was put together. Afterwards, Steve tells Ernie that he should still be proud, because he tried and did it himself. Teddy Eccles as Greg.
244	28	"Ernie's Crowd"	James V. Kern & James Sheldon	John McGreevey	April 6, 1967	0243
When Chip and a friend want to visit some girls, Ernie tags along and the girls spend most of their time with him. Robbie takes Ernie out for a soda. Robbie's friend Carole (Julie Parrish) sits with them and finds Ernie very charming. The next time Robbie goes to see Carole, Ernie tags along. Robbie and Chip now try to avoid Ernie. Steve takes Ernie bird watching with Helen Mitchell (Lynn Borden). Helen enjoys having Ernie with them. Now Steve tries to avoid Ernie. Charlie takes Ernie to a movie with Frieda. Frieda likes having Ernie around. Charlie tells Ernie to quit tagging along with everyone. Feeling bad, the family cancel their individual plans and spend the evening with Ernie. Bobby Diamond as Scuba.
245	29	"Ernie and the O'Grady"	James V. Kern & James Sheldon	Dorothy Cooper Foote	April 13, 1967	0237
Ernie meets homeless man Edward Alexander O'Grady (Eddie Foy Jr.) in the park. The next day, Ernie invites Edward over for dinner. Steve and Charley are a little surprised by Ernie's guest. Charley sees Edward for the vagabond that he is, but Steve says they can be polite to him for one night. Ernie invites Edward to stay the night and Edward hints that he may stay a couple weeks. Steve comes up with a plan to get Edward to leave. Steve has Ernie suggest to Edward that he do some work around the house. The plan works and Edward sneaks out without saying goodbye. Ernie comes to realize the kind of man Edward is and the things he is missing by not being in a family. Paul Sorensen as Policeman Kelly.
246	30	"The Sky Is Falling"	James V. Kern	Danny Simon	April 20, 1967	0246
Robbie runs into Al Morgan (Steve Franken), who dropped out of school the year before. Al offers Robbie a job as a part-time real estate agent. Robbie starts to do really well, but it takes up a lot of his time. Steve learns that Robbie is now flunking some of his classes. To Steve's dismay, Robbie tells him that he is quitting school. Robbie is about to make another sale when a torrential rain storm revealed that the home he is showing has a hidden flaw. He decides it's better to be honest and shows the couple the problem. Afterwards, Robbie tells Steve he's going back to school. Betty Lynn as Lois Bradley. Victoria Carroll as Gwen. Catherine Ferrar as Eloise.
247	31	"So Long Charley, Hello"	James V. Kern	Edmund Beloin & Henry Garson	April 27, 1967	0236
Cappy Engstrom (James Gregory), an old merchant marine shipmate, comes to visit Charley. He's going into the charter boat fishing business in Florida and wants Charley to join him. Charley wants to go, but realizes the Douglas family needs him. Steve tells the family that they should make Charley feel as though it's OK for him to go. At the airport, Charley has second thoughts and decides to stay home. Thinking that Charley still wants to go, Steve tells the family to pretend that they are fully capable of taking care of themselves. But before Charley can leave again, Ernie says he wants him to stay. The rest of the family agrees. Charley stays home and confesses he was only leaving because he thought the family wanted him to. Elsie Baker as Spinster.
248	32	"Weekend in Paradise"	James V. Kern	George Tibbles & Edmund Hartmann	May 11, 1967	0239
Steve's company sends him and the entire family on a business trip to Hawaii. At the hotel Robbie runs into Judy Leslie (Susan Seaforth Hayes), a girl he knew back home. Charley looks up Nani, a girl he knew back in his merchant marine days. He has forgotten that she has aged quite a bit since he last saw her. After she mentions marriage, Charley quickly leaves. Ernie is selling pineapple juice he got from the hotel until a Policeman (Mel Prestidge) tells him to stop. Nani and her two brothers find Charley at a Luau and Charley makes another quick exit. Even at the airport, Charley is afraid of being caught by Nani. Richard Loo as Mr. Chang.

=== Season 8 (1967–68) ===
No. overall	No. in season	Title	Directed by	Written by	Original release date	Prod. code
249	1	"Moving Day"	Fred de Cordova	George Tibbles	September 9, 1967	2245–0651
Steve gets transferred to California. They soon feel that the people in California, including their neighbors, are not very friendly. Steve reminisces about the early days at their old home. Robbie meets a very friendly Katie Miller (Tina Cole) at his new college. Steve finally talks to Jan Dearing (Joan Vohs), his neighbor. It turns out that they had just moved in as well. The two families have a barbecue together and Robbie has a vision of Katie in a wedding dress. Kathleen Freeman as Lady Checker. Don Brodie as Male Driver. Note: My Three Sons moved from Thursdays to Saturdays on CBS.
250	2	"Robbie Loves Katie"	Fred de Cordova	George Tibbles	September 16, 1967	2245–0663
Charley feels that Robbie is taking things too seriously with Katie and thinks he should see other girls. Steve has a talk with him and Robbie says he'll tell Katie they should see other people. But, instead of breaking up, Robbie proposes and Katie accepts. Robbie has second thoughts, but still can't find a way to end it with her. Deep down Robbie still cares for Katie. Robbie asks Steve for his help. Even Steve can't bring himself to say something to Katie. Because of something that Ernie says, Katie finds out what Rob's original intent was and runs off. Steve tells Katie how Robbie really feels and the two are back together.
251	3	"Inspection of the Groom"	Fred de Cordova	George Tibbles	September 23, 1967	2245–0653
Katie informs her sorority sisters that she is marrying Robbie in two weeks. The girls decide to do some research into him and come up with some mis-leading information. Katie's mother arrives from out of town. She arranges a get together with Robbie and some of Katie's family members. Steve explains that they will be looking him over to see if he is good enough for Katie. Katie's Grandma Collins gives Robbie her seal of approval. Note: Joan Tompkins makes her first of nine appearances as Katie's mother and Kathryn Givney the first of four appearances as Katie's grandmother.
252	4	"Countdown to Marriage"	Fred de Cordova	George Tibbles	September 30, 1967	2245–0658
It's the day before Robbie and Katie's wedding and things start to go wrong. Tramp runs away and can't be found. The dressmaker sends the wrong gown and bridesmaids dresses to the Douglas house. Then that evening, Robbie and Katie have a fight and decide to call off the wedding. Steve goes to talk to Katie but doesn't get too far. After Robbie comes by, Katie's grandmother intercedes, asking each if they love each other. Katie doesn't respond, but Robbie says he loves Katie. That's all Katie needs to hear. They reconcile and the wedding is back on. Meanwhile, Clark (Gil Rogers), Robbie's best man, falls ill and Chip is recruited to take his place. Mimi Gibson as Ellie.
253	5	"Wedding Bells"	Fred de Cordova	George Tibbles	October 7, 1967	2245–0668
The Douglas clan oversleeps on Robbie and Katie's wedding day and chaos reigns as they get ready. They do, however, make it to the church on time. Tramp was missing but arrives at the church just in time for the ceremony. The wedding goes off without a hitch. At the reception at the Douglas house, Ernie catches the wedding bouquet. Later in Robbie's empty room, Steve and Charley reflect on how fast Robbie has turned into a man.
254	6	"The Homecoming"	Fred de Cordova	Lois Hire	October 14, 1967	2245–0652
Robbie and Katie return from their honeymoon. Both Katie and the Douglas clan have to make some adjustments now that Katie has moved in. But it seems that Katie is having a harder time fitting in. Steve has a talk with Katie about how it was when he was first married and she feels much better.
255	7	"My Wife, the Waitress"	Fred de Cordova	Henry Garson & Edmond Beloin	October 21, 1967	2245–0655
Ernie lets it slip to Katie that Robbie is buying her a gift for their four-week anniversary. To raise money to buy Robbie a nice gift, Katie gets a part time job as a waitress. But she has to keep it a secret from Robbie. On her first day at work, Katie has to fill in for the cigarette girl and wear a skimpy outfit. Robbie's friend Tom has won a free lunch at the restaurant. Robbie blows his top when he sees how Katie is dressed and leaves. At home, the two have an argument. Steve intervenes to patch things up between the newlyweds. Dick Wilson as Maitre D'. Kaye Elhardt as Sharon, the Hat Check Girl.
256	8	"The Chameleon"	Fred de Cordova	Douglas Tibbles	October 28, 1967	2245–0660
Steve leaves for a business trip and leaves Robbie and Katie in charge. Ernie is having a hard time finding a friend. Ernie meets Mike at school. Mike likes to pull childish pranks that upset the Douglas family. Everyone thinks that Ernie should stop seeing Mike, but Katie wants to give him another chance. Mike reveals to the family the she is a girl named Michelle. Now that Ernie knows Mike is a girl, he wants nothing to do with her. Robbie goes to talk to Mike's parents only to learn that Mike doesn't have a mother. Michelle's father Jack (Paul Picerni) treats her like his son rather than his daughter. Katie helps Michelle bring out her feminine side and Ernie decides to be friends with her.
257	9	"Designing Woman"	Fred de Cordova	Paul West	November 4, 1967	2245–0670
Chip's friend Trudi has been doing a lot of favors for him. Harve Gregory (Tyler McVey) assigns attractive lady engineer Eileen Talbot (Oscar-winner Anne Baxter) to help Steve on a rush project. Everyone in the family really likes Eileen. Only level-headed Katie recognizes her as a manipulating woman. At work, Steve mentions his birthday is Saturday and asks Eileen to stop by. She says he should be with family. Trudi wants to go to see a band and Chip needs money. Charley tells him that's why she's been doing things for him. Katie tries to subtly explain to Steve how she feels about Eileen. It's Saturday and Steve's birthday. The project that Steve and Eileen were working on gets the go ahead from Ed Shelton (Robert Carson), the executive vice president of the company. Steve mentions that Ed will stopping by the house before dinner and Steve thinks Eileen should be there. That night Steve introduces Eileen to Ed. Steve must have known what Katie was trying to say, because Eileen immediately fawns all over Ed. The rest of the family now see what Katie meant.
258	10	"Ernie, the Bluebeard"	Fred de Cordova	Douglas Tibbles	November 11, 1967	2245–0662
Ernie innocently gives Connie Farmer his picture. She assumes they are going together and wants him to take her to the upcoming "Gym Dandy" school dance. Because he traded something with Sylvia Walters (pre-Brady Bunch Maureen McCormick), she expects the same thing. Chip suggests Ernie be honest and tell the girls he doesn't want to go to the dance with them. Ernie has a Romeo and Juliet dream. Mrs. Farmer comes by, talks to Ernie and insists he take Connie to the dance. Jim Walters (John Bryant) calls Steve and wants Ernie to take Sylvia. Ernie learns that both girls are showing up at the Douglas home the night of the dance. Chip steps in to escort Connie, who is thrilled to be with an older man. Ernie then escorts Sylvia. After the dance, Steve tells Chip how proud he is of him.
259	11	"The Heartbeat"	Fred de Cordova	Bernard Rothman	November 18, 1967	2245–0665
Steve is away on a business trip. The rest of the Douglas men are going to a sporting event and Robbie tells Katie they'll be home by 11:00. Katie is awoken by a late night storm and realizes it's after 1:00 am. She calls the stadium and the Night Watchman (Guy Wilkerson) tells her everyone was out of there by 11:00. Katie then hears what seems to be a loud heartbeat sound. She calls Steve in a panic, but he calms her down. The Douglas men finally come home and Katie tells them what she heard. Later that night, everyone else also hears the heartbeat. Charlie learns that the original owner died in the home. The next night there is another storm and the heartbeat noise returns. This time it's the Douglas men that panic. Steve returns home and after hearing the sound, he has a simple explanation for it. Olan Soule as Dr. Smallwood.
260	12	"The Computer Picnic"	Fred de Cordova	Douglas Tibbles	November 25, 1967	2245–0667
Chip's class uses a computer to get dates with kids from another school for the upcoming "computer picnic". Meanwhile, Ernie takes Tramp to obedience school. Chip is excited to be matched up with a Marlene Hendrix. That all changes when he meets her and sees that she's a foot taller than he is. Steve says that Chip shouldn't hurt Marlene's feelings and still go to the picnic with her. Marlene can tell Chip is uncomfortable with the situation and suggests that they could trade dates. So Chip and his buddies get together and swap their dates. Chip ends up trading dates with his much taller friend, Marv. Chip gets along great with his new date, Angela Mason. Ernie uses his own money to get a little boy a dog. The boy's father comes by to thank Ernie. Kevin Brodie as Carl Murchinson. Paul O'Keefe as Norman. Billy Booth as Jack. Note: Ed Begley Jr. makes his first screen appearance in a bit part as Chip's classmate Marv.
261	13	"The Aunt Who Came to Dinner"	Fred de Cordova	William Raynor & Myles Wilder	December 2, 1967	2245–0654
Katie's snooty Aunt Cecile Blackman (Marsha Hunt) visits the Douglas home. Katie doesn't say it, but she is clearly not thrilled to have her aunt visit. Steve has to go away on business, so Charley offers Steve's room to Cecile. It's not long before Cecile rearranges their furniture and annoyingly disrupts their lives. She even starts to cause some friction between Katie and Robbie. Katie finally tells Cecile that though she means well, her meddling is causing problems. Cecile now feels bad. Charley has a talk with her and tells her how when he first moved in, he did the same things. Cecile comes to realize she doesn't have to over do things and everything will be much better.
262	14	"Leaving the Nest"	Fred de Cordova	Peggy Elliott	December 9, 1967	2245–0656
Everyone in the Douglas household finds that they are getting in each other's way a lot more often. This causes minor and major irritations to arise. Robbie and Katie move temporarily into a borrowed apartment while their friends are away. The family comes to visit and finds the apartment quite cramped. Robbie and Katie's life is complicated by the absence of a coffee pot, a pull-down bed that won't go up, and the lack of a television set, among many other things. Robbie and Katie wind up coming back to the Douglas household many times to borrow things. It's not long before they find that they miss what they had at home and move back.
263	15	"You're Driving Me Crazy"	Fred de Cordova	George Tibbles	December 16, 1967	2245–0679
Chip is so nervous about taking his driving test that Katie decides to help by taking the test with him. Katie asks Rob to teach her to drive, but she has a hard time learning from him. Katie then asks Steve to teach her. When Steve goes out with Chip, Chip drives like a maniac. Both eventually pass their driving tests. Steve lets each of them borrow his car. A mysterious huge scratch winds up on the car and neither Chip nor Katie are willing to take the blame. Roy Wells (George N. Neise) comes by with his son Roger and tells Steve that Roger is responsible for the scratch. The Douglases are taken aback at the way the Roy berates his son for being so careless. Chip thanks Steve for not acting the way Roy did.
264	16	"Liverpool Saga"	Fred de Cordova	Freddy Rhea	December 23, 1967	2245–0661
Chip is practicing with his rock band for a local band contest. Chip's neighbor Barbara tells him that her cousin Paul Drayton (Jeremy Clyde of Chad and Jeremy fame) is visiting from Liverpool and he plays guitar. The band hope to have Paul join them. But when they hear him play, he has a much more laid back, folk style. Chip and the band now avoid seeing Paul. Paul offers to fix Joey's motor scooter and Chip and Paul bond while doing it. Chip invites Paul to the band contest. At the contest the MC recognizes Paul as a rising folk star from England and introduces him to the audience. Paul playing with Chip's band helps them win the trophy. Chip lets Paul keep the trophy.
265	17	"The Chaperones"	Fred de Cordova	Paul West	December 30, 1967	2245–0674
Robbie and Katie serve as chaperones for three high school couples, including Chip, on an overnight trip to a park cabin. With Robbie as a chaperone, Chip thought that the couples could get away with whatever they wanted to do. Chip soon finds that not to be the case. Katie insists that Robbie follow and supervise as the couples separately go hiking outside and to a lake. The couples are annoyed when every time they turn around, Robbie is there. In the evening the group plan to sneak out and borrow Robbie's car to drive to a tavern, but Robbie purposely disables the car so it won't start. Back at home, Robbie feels bad that he ruined the kids trip. Chip actually thanks Robbie for what he did. Kevin Brodie as Gordy. Annette O'Toole as Tina.
266	18	"Green-Eyed Robbie"	Fred de Cordova	Lois Hire	January 6, 1968	2245–0666
Katie becomes a tutor to earn some extra money. She is surprised to learn that her first student is a male. Meanwhile, Charlie asks out Sally (Shirley Mitchell) from the diner. When Katie's student shows up, he turns out to be Craig Benson (Charles Knox Robinson billed as Charles Robinson), a handsome ex-boyfriend of hers. Robbie meets Craig, but doesn't know about his and Katie's past. Katie asks Charlie if she should tell Robbie about Craig and Charlie says no. Ernie overhears this and lets is slip to Robbie. Robbie gets upset when he catches Katie and Craig having dinner together. Robbie and Katie have a fight, but quickly make up.
267	19	"Charley's Tea"	Fred de Cordova	Paul West	January 13, 1968	2245–0657
Katie complains to Robbie when Uncle Charley makes her feel unnecessary in the Douglas household. Meanwhile, Chip is on a five-man school committee; four of the 'men' are girls. Katie wants to have some of her friends over for tea, but is now afraid of what Charley might say. At the first committee meeting the girls frustrate Chip by ignoring his ideas. Charley continues to make Katie feel useless. Steve speaks to Charley who is flabbergasted at the accusation, but immediately wants to do something nice for her. Charley offers to throw the tea party for Katie. Chip tells the girls of the committee how Charley is going decorate for the tea with party balloons and donuts. The girls decide to show Charley how to really decorate for a tea. Much to Katie's surprise, the tea party turns out to be huge success.
268	20	"Ernie, the Jinx"	Fred de Cordova	Austin Kalish & Irma Kalish	January 20, 1968	2245–0678
Ernie's baseball team breaks their 11-game losing streak after he sits out for the game. Ernie now believes that he is a jinx. The family try to assure Ernie that there is no such thing as a jinx, but things still seem to go wrong. Ernie has a dream that he is sailing on the Titanic. Robbie and Chip start to think Ernie might be a jinx. Ernie has a dream that he helped cause the great Chicago fire. Bad things continue to happen wherever Ernie is. Even the fortune teller that Ernie visits to break the jinx is affected when she gets arrested by the police as Ernie leaves. Ernie has a dream that he joins General Custer and his men. Steve tells Ernie that the family still loves him, no matter what.
269	21	"Ernie and Zsa Zsa"	Fred de Cordova	Bill Kelsay	January 27, 1968	2245–0669
Ernie and Tramp are left alone at home on a day off from school. Steve tells Ernie not to go wandering off and be good. Ernie gets bored so he decides to take Tramp and ride his bike in Beverly Hills to look for movie star homes. Ernie gets thirsty, so he climbs over a retaining wall and he falls in a swimming pool belonging to Zsa Zsa Gabor. She brings Ernie in to dry off. Zsa Zsa then invites Ernie to spend the day with her at the movie studio. Tramp returns home alone and Charley starts to look for him and then tells Steve. Ernie does try to call home several times, but no one ever is around. Steve calls the police. As Ernie heads back home, a boy (Stephen McEveety) tells Ernie that "some dumb kid" got lost in the hills, so Ernie decides to stay and watch. He then runs into Steve and Charlie. At home, no one believe Ernie's story, until Zsa Zsa shows up at the Douglases home to check up on him. Janice Carroll as Michelle. Vince Howard as Police Officer.
270	22	"A Horse for Uncle Charley"	Fred de Cordova	Edmund Beloin & Henry Garson	February 3, 1968	2245–0676
Charley has been feeling down in the dumps lately. Dave Clayburn (Don Brodie) comes by and tries to talk Charley into buying an 11-year-old trotting horse named Gypsy King. In the hopes of capturing old racing glories and the potential purses that the horse could win, Charlie does wind up buying the horse. The family is happy that Charley is excited about something again. With Charley driving the sulky, the horse wins his qualifying race, but wasn't fast enough to actually qualify. Realizing that the horse's racing days are over, Charley makes a deal with trainer Doc Wetherford (James Westerfield) to retire Gypsy King at his stable. Ernie can then ride him whenever he wants.
271	23	"Dear Enemy"	Fred de Cordova	George Tibbles	February 10, 1968	2245–0673
Charley, Chip and Ernie are going camping at Yosemite. Robbie goes to Camp Roberts for two weeks military reserve training. Robbie calls and tells Katie that she can stay at a nearby motel because he's sure he'll get some time off. During a walk, Katie winds up in the mock battlefield and gets arrested by Robbie's unit. Charley writes Steve to say they will be going to a lake near Robbie. Of course, the family must also traipse through the same woods, and by happenstance or misadventure each member of the family is inadvertently caught as a military prisoner. Steve drives to where Charley is, hoping to prevent the family from also interfering. There he manages to get captured first by the aggressor team, then by the defender team. Robert L. Crawford Jr. as Stan Burrows. Preston Hanson as Major. William Boyett as Captain. Kenneth Washington as Corporal.
272	24	"Uncle Charley's Aunt"	Fred de Cordova	George Tibbles	February 17, 1968	2245–0682
The Douglas family perform Downtown (Petula Clark song) in their living room. Charley is entertainment director for Frolics Night at his lodge, but he's having trouble lining up the entertainment. Charley and his friends perform as Florodora girls in the show. After the show, Charley falls asleep and is forced to walk home dressed as the Lady for a Day character Apple Annie after he is locked out of the dressing room. While resting on a park bench, an elderly man (Charles P. Thompson) mistakes Charley for a woman and begins flirting with him. Charley gets arrested for hitting the man. Gil Lamb as Ted Dollinger. Larry J. Blake as Police Sergeant. Rolfe Sedan as Doctor. Frank J. Scannell as Master of Ceremonies.
273	25	"The Standing Still Tour"	Fred de Cordova	George Tibbles	February 24, 1968	2245–0675
Steve is on a business trip to Amsterdam, Robbie is in the South Pacific for military reserve training, Chip is on a school trip to Mexico and Katie is visiting her mother. Ernie and Uncle Charley are left home alone. Charley runs into old shipmate Toby Chambers (Douglas Fowley) and invites him over for dinner. Charley doesn't know that Toby is now a famous star acting in a TV western. When Toby arrives at the house, Ernie recognizes him right away. Toby invites Ernie and Charley to the television studio to watch the filming. Meanwhile, Steve is stuck in his hotel room working, Robbie can't leave camp to visit the local town, and Chip gets tonsillitis and misses out on seeing Mexico. Toby gives Charley and Ernie bit parts in Toby's show. Victor Brandt as Frank Brown. Fred de Cordova as First Director. Harry Fleer as Second Director.
274	26	"Honorable Guest"	Fred de Cordova	Austin Kalish & Irma Kalish	March 2, 1968	2245–0677
Ernie is looking forward to a family camping trip, but he thinks something will go wrong and they won't be able to leave. The Wong family from Bryant Park drop in on the Douglases unexpectedly while on their way to Hong Kong. Since it is late, Steve invites the Wongs to stay overnight. Of course this means the trip is canceled. Daughter Lisa spends the day with Ernie while Steve shows Alice (Beulah Quo) and Ray Wong (Benson Fong) around town. The Wongs are too polite to tell Steve that they were to spend the weekend with Uncle George (Philip Ahn) in Chinatown. Lisa finally tells Ernie that they were supposed to be with Uncle George. Steve still insists that they don't mention the camping trip. Steve straightens things out with Uncle George and George brings the family party to the Douglas house.
275	27	"The Perfect Separation"	Fred de Cordova	James Brooks	March 9, 1968	2245–0664
This is the first time Katie and Robbie entertain at home. They invite a married couple, Denise (Lynn Loring) and Larry Robinson (Robert Dunlap), over. Instead of playing a board game, Denise, a psychology student, suggests that they tell the others what he or she dislikes about them. She calls it "Form of Honesty". Rob and Katie are uncomfortable with the idea, and Denise criticizes Katie for her comments about Rob. Larry starts to feel that Denise is just being rude. He tells her off and Denise suggests that they separate. Rob and Katie hope to get them together and invite them over again. Charley tells off Denise and she is about to leave. Katie talks to Denise and at first she doesn't like what Katie says. But then she comes around and asks everyone to forgive her, especially Larry. Charley sees Denise and Larry hugging and thinks it was because of what he said.
276	28	"Gossip, Incorporated"	Fred de Cordova	Lois Hire	March 16, 1968	2245–0672
Steve is promoted to head of the helicopter division. The secretaries all find Steve attractive. They look into his personnel file and are happy to learn he is single. Katie would like to visit the plant, so Steve tells her to let people know that she's "Mrs. Robbie Douglas". Charley brings his helicopter-loving girlfriend Sally (Shirley Mitchell) for a plant tour. At first Sally is not allowed in. Charley pretends that Sally is Mrs. Douglas and she then gets in. Katie shows up and is announced as Mrs. Douglas. The secretaries are confused and suspect that their new boss is a bigamist. Not knowing that Sally is posing as Mrs. Douglas, Steve doesn't understand why his co-workers suddenly act cold to him. That night Steve learns how Sally got into the plant. The next day, Steve subtly explains to his secretary Janet Ingram (Abby Dalton) who the two women were. Marvin Kaplan as Joe. Jane Dulo as Jane Allen. Marcia Mae Jones as Mary. Gail Fisher as Carla. John Alvin as Al. William Forrest as Ed Hoffman. Paul Sorensen as Guard #1.
277	29	"The Masculine Mystique"	Fred de Cordova	George Tibbles	March 23, 1968	2245–0681
Ernie has a new friend named Shorty and they are spending a lot of time together. Meanwhile, Chip is upset when a friend steals his girlfriend. Charley says that Chip should hit the guy, but Steve says he should talk to the boy. Shorty tells Ernie that he is taking Anita to a Sunday Matinee. Shorty later calls Ernie to tell him that his mother is making him visit his aunt and he can't go to the movie. Anita innocently asks Ernie to walk with her to the movies since he was going anyway. Shorty sees Ernie and Anita walking together and believes that Ernie is stealing his girlfriend. Shorty stops talking to Ernie. Even Chip is upset with Ernie. Shorty helps Katie in with groceries and Robbie pretends that he thinks that Shorty is flirting with his wife. Shorty understands the message and becomes friends with Ernie again.
278	30	"The Tire Thief"	Fred de Cordova	Douglas Tibbles	March 30, 1968	2245–0671
Charley reads that there have been several burglaries in the neighborhood. Ernie's friends, Clifford and Gordon, convince him to sell two worn out tires found in the Douglas' storage room to get money to buy more powerful squirt guns. Ernie still feels funny about taking the tires. Charley notices the tires are missing and calls the police. The boys see the police at Ernie's house. Ernie and Clifford tell Clifford's mother, Mrs. Crawford (Ann McCrea), what they did. She tells Ernie to let someone in his family know before it gets any worse. A guilty-feeling Ernie confesses to Katie who then tells Steve. As punishment, Steve makes Ernie go down to the police station to admit to what he did. Joel Fluellen as Sergeant Powers.

=== Season 9 (1968–69) ===
No. overall	No. in season	Title	Directed by	Written by	Original release date	Prod. code
279	1	"The Great Pregnancy"	Fred de Cordova	George Tibbles	September 28, 1968	2245–0683
The family is doing some spring cleaning. Katie gets a letter from her mother, Lorraine Miller (Joan Tompkins), asking her how she is. Katie does a lot of heavy lifting and faints on her bed. She tells Chip that she was just resting. Katie then does some cleaning with ammonia and faints again. Lorraine arrives and says her woman's intuition tells her Katie is pregnant. Robbie has a hard time believing Lorraine can predict something like that. Even Steve's secretary Janet Dawson (Betty Lynn ) has a feeling Katie is pregnant. The test results confirm Katie is going to have a baby. Grandma Collins (Kathryn Givney) tells Steve everyone will pamper Katie, but to also take care of Robbie.
280	2	"Dr. Osborne, M.D."	Fred de Cordova	George Tibbles	October 5, 1968	2245–0684
Katie and Robbie must choose a doctor to see them through her pregnancy. A lot of people recommend their doctor. Katie's mother makes an appointment for her to see their family doctor, Roy Osborne. Robbie is skeptical because he is a G.P. and not a specialist. He is also not happy that he basically works out of his house. Dr. Osborne says Katie is fine, but then diagnoses Robbie with a sudden chest infection. Katie likes Dr. Osborne. Robbie is called last minute to go to his new job. He asks Steve to sit in for him at baby class. Robbie does eventually come to like Dr. Osborne as he recovers from his illness. and recommends him to a friend who is also having a baby. Venerable character actor Leon Ames in his first of four appearances as Dr. Osborne. Lurene Tuttle as Natalie Corcoran. Robert L. Crawford Jr. as Tod Springer. Lillian Powell as Housekeeper. Note: Chip and Ernie do not appear. This also marks the first time Robbie becomes sick. This is the second episode Chip is absent and the first where Ernie is absent.
281	3	"Life Begins in Katie"	Fred de Cordova	George Tibbles	October 12, 1968	2245–0685
Ernie's says that his friend Gordon's dog Francis is going to have babies. Francis and Tramp have been "going steady". Meanwhile, Katie and Robbie feel the baby move for the first time. Ernie asks Steve if he should be more involved with Francis having puppies as Tramp is the father. Robbie wonders whether he's ready for the responsibility of fatherhood. He decides it's time for him to mature and take life more seriously. Robbie starts dressing in suit and tie and starts tutoring students. Katie talks to Steve about Robbie maybe acting a little too mature. Francis has her babies. Robbie realizes he doesn't need to be a "stuffed shirt" to be a good father. Joan Vohs as Jan Dearing. Butch Patrick makes his first of seven appearances as Ernie's best pal Gordon Dearing.
282	4	"The Grandfathers"	Fred de Cordova	Lois Hire	October 19, 1968	2245–0686
Steve tells his secretary Janet how excited he is to become a grandfather. Steve is to meet with hard-boiled Air Force General Striker (Arthur O'Connell) to sell a company product. Meanwhile, Ernie is running for student council. Janet and other co-workers throw Steve a grandfather shower at the office. Striker and Major Bowers (Herbert Anderson) arrive during the shower. Striker is a grandfather as well and he would like to meet Katie. They go to the Douglas house where Striker determines by the way she walks that Katie will have a boy. The next several times Steve and Striker meet, the General talks more about his grandson than the product Steve is selling. Striker winds up leaving without placing an order with Steve. Ernie loses his bid for student council. The General later calls and orders Steve's product and still talks about his grandson. Yvonne Lime as Linda. Larry Gelman as Man.
283	5	"The Baby Nurse"	Fred de Cordova	George Tibbles	October 26, 1968	2245–0701
Charley would like to be Rob and Katie's baby nurse, but Steve doesn't think he has enough experience. Charley hints to the two that he's available, but they don't make the connection. He decides to take on some baby sitting jobs to gain experience. Charley panics in his first attempt with an actual baby and calls Katie to help him. It's not long before Charley gains his confidence and gets many more jobs. Rob and Katie still don't ask Charley to be the baby nurse. After a while, Rob and Katie figure out why Charley was taking all the jobs. Then it's a combination of them asking and Charley volunteering to become the baby nurse. Ann McCrea as Mrs. Masters. Robert Broyles as John Hawkins.
284	6	"Big Ol' Katie"	Fred de Cordova	Lois Hire	November 9, 1968	2245–0690
Robbie and his friend Bryant Colfax tease their pregnant wives about how big they're getting. Katie feels she is even bigger than Lisa Colfax, who is over due. Lisa has her baby. Katie thinks that Robbie is ashamed of how she looks. Robbie is going away on military reserve training for two weeks. Steve takes Katie to see Dr. Osborne and he tells her she is having more than one baby. Besides Steve, Katie doesn't want anyone to know before she can tell Robbie. Everyone notices how happy Katie is now and want to know what's changed. Katie isn't due for a couple weeks, but she starts to get labor pains and Robbie cannot be contacted. Georgia Schmidt as Minnie.
285	7	"My Three Grandsons"	Fred de Cordova	George Tibbles	November 16, 1968	2245–0688
Robbie is still away on Army maneuver training and he's unaware that Katie is expecting multiple births. Katie tells Steve that it's time to go to the hospital. At the hospital, Steve is a bundle of nerves. Charley is trying to get a hold of Robbie. Robbie is told by a Sergeant that he is being sent home because Katie is at the hospital. At the hospital, rules only allow two people in the waiting room per expectant mother. Charley, Chip and Ernie each try to get in claiming to be the father. Robbie finally arrives just as Katie is giving birth. Steve is about to tell everyone that Katie is having more than one baby. Nurse Rogers (Patience Cleveland) comes in and gets Robbie. In this touching episode, Katie surprises everyone by giving birth to identical triplet sons. Sarah Selby as Admissions Clerk. Note: At the end of the episode, the new mother asks her husband "What are you thinking?" and Robbie replies "I'm thinking about how much I love you... and my three sons," followed by big smiles and a tender kiss.
286	8	"Tea for Three"	Fred de Cordova	George Tibbles	November 23, 1968	2245–0689
Everyone goes to pick up Katie and the babies from the hospital. Katie and Robbie named the boys Robert Jr., Steven and Charles. Robbie is still adjusting to having three boys. Rob soon tires of all the attention that the triplets get and the repeated questions that everyone is asking like "How do you tell them apart?" Katie and Robbie have a fight over what he perceives as the boys being put on exposition. Katie has a talk with Steve and feels better. It's not long before Robbie enjoys the attention the babies get. Yale Summers as Young Man. Mittie Lawrence as Nurse. Mimi Gibson as Sorority Girl in Red Dress.
287	9	"Back to Earth"	Fred de Cordova	George Tibbles	November 30, 1968	2245–0693
Robbie decides to quit school, get a job, and move his family into their own place. He feels there's no room for them at home and he's creating an extra burden. Rob's college counselor, Wendell Walters (Vince Howard), urges him to think it over before making any decision. After seeing some of the problems that are caused at home, Robbie is determined to leave. Katie wants to stay and questions Robbie's motives. Robbie tells Steve his plans. Steve had planned on remodeling their room, but tells Rob whatever he decides is OK. Counselor Walters asks the administration office to delay Robbie's paperwork until the weekend is over. Rob discovers that despite the financial burden placed on his father, Steve enjoys taking care of the boys. Rob decides to stay and Steve shows him the design plans for their room.
288	10	"First Night Out"	Fred de Cordova	Rocci Chatfield	December 7, 1968	2245–0694
Katie wants to go to her high school class reunion on friday night and needs someone to watch the babies. It seems that everybody but Ernie has plans for that night. They are reluctant to leave Ernie alone with the babies, so they hire a nurse recommended by Dr. Osborne. Nurse Genevieve Goodbody (Rose Marie) arrives. Each of the worried family members calls to check in on Genevieve. Because she is busy with the babies, Genevieve finally takes the phone off the hook. But now the constant busy signal worries everyone even more. Everyone rushes home only to find that everything is fine. Jack Smith as John. Don Brodie as Henry.
289	11	"Casanova O'Casey"	Fred de Cordova	Ramey Idriss	December 14, 1968	2245–0697
Charley goes to pick up his girlfriend Sally. He finds out from her boss Joe (Horace McMahon), that she ran off to Las Vegas to get married. Charley comes home depressed and Katie knows there's something seriously wrong. She leaves a note for Steve. The next day, Charley tries to get to know the new waitress at the dinner, but she's not interested. Charley takes the triplets out to the park and he perks up when a group of women show up to fawn over the babies. He starts taking the boys to the park everyday. Charley meets Cora Dennis (Amzie Strickland) in the park and tells her that he is the grandfather. He starts to spend time with Cora and several other ladies. But going out with several women backfires on Charley. Charley meets a Librarian (Patience Cleveland) and they get along great. Lois January as Woman. Johnny Silver as Customer.
290	12	"Expendable Katie"	Fred de Cordova	Lois Hire	December 21, 1968	2245–0705
The triplets are teething and Katie is exhausted from taking care of them and from lack of sleep. Katie's mother Lorraine comes by and calls Dr. Osborne. He recommends that Katie stay with Lorraine a few days in Santa Barbara and rest. Katie feels guilty that the family has to take care of the babies. After she calls home and Charley says everything is OK, Katie starts to feel unneeded. The noise and chaos caused by Ernie and his friends overwhelm Charley, Robbie and the babies. The house is starting to look like a disaster area. So a three-woman cleaning crew is hired to restore the home to its usual state. Steve and Katie return home and find the house surprisingly spotless. Katie feels even more useless. Steve tells her that he found a receipt for the cleaning women in the kitchen. Flip Mark as Jim. Kevin Brodie as George. Jon Walmsley as First Boy. Stephen McEveety as Second Boy.
291	13	"The New Room"	Fred de Cordova	George Tibbles	December 28, 1968	2245–0707
Steve wants to have Robbie and Katie's bedroom enlarged to include a nursery. Steve, Robbie and Katie are going over the plans with Carl Storffman (Ed Begley), the contractor. Cantankerous Carl locks horns with Steve and Robbie, but when Katie suggests something, he goes along with it. While doing the work, Carl continues to not get along with anyone but Katie. Katie says that because of the dust and noise, she and the babies will stay at her grandmothers. Charley worries that she won't be around to calm down Carl. David Storffman (Gary Clarke), Carl's son, comes looking for him, as he hasn't come home. David tells them that Carl has nine sons, and his grandchildren are all boys. He also mentions that their mother and only sister died a few years ago. David's wife is expecting another baby. The next day, David tells Carl that he's been blessed with a granddaughter.
292	14	"The Fountain of Youth"	Fred de Cordova	George Tibbles	January 4, 1969	2245–0709
Steve is going to dinner at a friends house where, as Ernie says, "They always set him up with some clunky lady". Meanwhile, Katie has a couple girl cousins coming to visit. Robbie would like Chip and Ernie to entertain them. Chip and Ernie are not interested. Steve meets attractive Carol Whiting (Wanda Hendrix) going into the friends house. Steve arranges to see Carol again. Charley is concerned that Carol will think Steve is too old when she sees the family and the babies. Carol meets Ernie and now doesn't answer Steve's calls. When Katie asks Chip and Ernie about the cousins, they reluctantly agree. Turns out that Katie's cousins don't want to meet Chip and Ernie. Carol finally comes over again and meets the rest of the family. Seems Carol was concerned that Steve wouldn't be interested in her when he found out she was a grandmother.
293	15	"Three's a Crowd"	Fred de Cordova	George Tibbles	January 11, 1969	2245–0708
Some in the family start to doubt that Katie is accurate in identifying the triplets. Meanwhile, Ernie tells everyone how a lot of the kids at his school are having their lunches stolen. Steve is babysitting for the evening. Katie panics when Steve tells her he bathed the boys. Apparently, she put ink dots on the babies feet to help her tell them apart and now the ink is washed off. Katie and Charley take the babies to the hospital to match them to their footprints. At school, Ernie tries to catch the lunch thief, but winds up being sent to the principal. Katie decides to put name tags on the babies clothes. Not knowing this, Steve changes the babies clothes and ruins the new ID method. So Steve takes them back to the hospital and this time gets identification bracelets. Ernie says that the lunch thief finally got caught. Sarah Selby as Third Nurse.
294	16	"Chip and Debbie"	Fred de Cordova	Aljean Harmetz & Diane Johnson	January 18, 1969	2245–0702
Ernie is taking a cooking class in school because the other electives were full. Chip has new girlfriend Debbie Hunter (Angela Cartwright) over for dinner and he wants everyone to make a good impression. Charley and Robbie tell Steve that they think things might be progressing too quickly between Chip and Debbie. Steve isn't concerned. Chip and Debbie announce that they are engaged and Debbie shows off her ring. Steve goes to talk with John (Walter Reed) and Harriet Hunter (Margaret Field), Debbie's parents. After an awkward start to the conversation, Steve and the Hunter's agree that the children are too young. They won't interfere with the kids for now, hoping it will just pass. One day Katie suddenly faints and Robbie has to take her to see the doctor. Chip and Debbie are left alone to take care of the triplets. After some time with the babies, the couple decide to call off the engagement.
295	17	"What Did You Do Today, Grandpa?"	Fred de Cordova	Henry Garson	January 25, 1969	2245–0703
Charley thinks Steve is stuck in a rut. At work, Steve meets Air Force Major Lodge (Forrest Compton) and is told he'll be leaving for New York immediately. In New York, Steve meets with General Winters (Henry Hunter). Steve is told he is being recruited to be a double agent willing to sell secrets to America's enemy. He'll be protected at all times and if all goes as planned, he'll be home for dinner. Steve's contact turns out to be attractive Mrs. Carstairs (Anne Jeffreys). Steve bungles his way through with Mrs. Carstairs. She suspects Steve is not genuine and leads him through a series of tests. He is led around a New York City full of eccentric characters, including Hugo (Mike Mazurki) and Mr. X (Johnny Haymer). Steve is chased into a hotel bathroom where Mr. X shoots through a shower curtain that Steve was hiding behind. Just then the good guys arrive to arrest everyone. Steve is OK and is sent home. Charley asks him what he did today, but Steve can't tell the family the truth. Morgan Jones as McAllister.
296	18	"Chip on Wheels"	Fred de Cordova	Lois Hire	February 1, 1969	2245–0696
Chip is interested in buying his friend Wayne's (Kevin Brodie) hot rod. His girlfriend Marilyn is not impressed with the car. Chip almost has enough money to buy it. Steve reminds him about insurance and other costs. Knowing that Chip's birthday is coming up, Steve buys him a 30-year-old Tin Lizzie. Robbie sees that Chip is disappointed with the "old ladies" car, but Chip says it's great. Chip is embarrassed to be seen in the car. Robbie tells Chip he better not let Steve know how he feels about the car. Wayne comes by and is impressed by the genuine antique car in original condition. He offers to trade his hot rod for it plus some cash. Chip turns him down and says he's keeping the car because his dad gave it to him.
297	19	"Honorable Expectant Grandfather"	Fred de Cordova	George Tibbles	February 8, 1969	2245–0698
Robbie is to appear on college TV to discuss the triplets. Steve's is surprised to learn former Bryant Park co-worker, Ray Wong (Benson Fong), has transferred to Los Angeles. Ray tells Steve that his daughter Gloria is married and going to have a baby. He also mentions that he can't stand his son-in-law Henry because he's a long-haired hippie. Henry is intelligent but has no direction in life. Robbie and Katie invite Gloria and Henry over. Henry visits where Steve and Ray work in case he would like to work there. An excited Ray calls Steve to tell him Gloria had twin boys. Now Ray doesn't mind Henry so much. Note: This episode is Benson Fong's seventh and final appearance.
298	20	"The Other Woman"	Fred de Cordova	Dennis Whitcomb	February 15, 1969	2245–0700
Ernie sees Robbie driving down the street with an attractive young woman. Meanwhile, Mrs. Murdock would like Charley to sign a petition against the councilman's plan to widen the streets. Steve tells Charley to talk to the councilman first, but Charlie doesn't. Ernie tells Chip about what he saw and Chip tells Ernie to not mention it to anyone. Chip answers a call from Louise (Leslie Michaels), who thinks she's talking to Robbie. She was the woman in the car, and she wants to meet up with Robbie again because she thinks her husband is getting suspicious. Chip gives Robbie the message. Chip and Ernie follow Robbie and see Louise kiss Robbie. They tell Steve what they saw and he says that he trusts Robbie. Charley finds out from a Traffic Department Man (Ollie O'Toole) that the councilman is only having the crosswalks painted. Chip and Ernie find out that Louise was just a friend who Robbie was helping make plans for a surprise anniversary party for her husband. Steve takes delight in telling both Charley and the boys, "I told you so".
299	21	"Goodbye Forever"	Fred de Cordova	Doug Tibbles	February 22, 1969	2245–0706
Ernie is upset that his best friend and next-door-neighbor Gordon will be moving away. Gordon doesn't even know where the family is moving to. Steve tells Ernie to spend as much time with Gordon as he can. Robbie suggests having a going away party for Gordon. At the party, Ernie is anxious about giving a going away speech. The next day the two friends say their final good-byes and exchange mementos. Gordon gets into the moving van with the two moving men. While having dinner, the family tries to cheer Ernie up. Suddenly, Gordon walks in and tells Ernie that he just moved to the next block. Ernie tells Steve that he's a little upset because of what he went through, only to have Gordon still here. Ernie comes around and calls Gordon.
300	22	"The O'Casey Scandal"	Fred de Cordova	Lois Hire	March 1, 1969	2245–0699
Ernie and his friend Janet want to go to the Battle of the Bands, but they need a ride. Ernie gets Uncle Charley to drive them. When Charley brings Janet home, he is introduced to Janet's Grandmother, Beatrice Brady (Irene Hervey). Charley and Beatrice hit it off right away and they go out on a date. Both Janet and Ernie think Charley and Beatrice are too old to be having that kind of fun. Ernie tells the rest of the family that Charley is disgracing them. Janet tells Beatrice she's not acting like a grandmother. Janet says that Ernie better think of something as the whole thing is his fault. Charley and Beatrice take Ernie and Janet to a square dance. Ernie and Janet can barely keep up with the old folks. Steve tells Ernie he shouldn't worry about people acting their ages.
301	23	"Ernie's Pen Pal"	Fred de Cordova	Doug Tibbles	March 8, 1969	2245–0695
As a school assignment, Ernie has to write to Latin American pen pal Maria in spanish and she has to write back in English. Ernie doesn't know what to write, so Steve tells him to write as if she was a good friend. Knowing it won't happen, Ernie writes Maria and invites her to dinner. Ernie receives a cablegram saying that Maria excepts his invitation and will be arriving shortly. Carlos Oriana (Valentin de Vargas) tells Charley that Maria is the Ambassador's daughter. Carlos is just checking things out to make sure the Ambassador will be safe. Carlos drops off Maria and her Aunt Enriquetta. The Ambassador couldn't make it. Despite early nervousness, the dinner goes well. But then Ernie mentions he only wrote Maria to get good grades. And Charley doesn't speak Spanish as well as he thought and winds up insulting Enriquetta. The two abruptly leave. The next day, the two come back, realizing that Ernie and Charley didn't mean anything bad. Gil Rogers as Delivery Boy.
302	24	"Ernie the Transmitter"	Fred de Cordova	Dorothy Cooper Foote	March 15, 1969	2245–0692
Ernie's teacher Mr. Kranzman (Booth Colman) is discussing ESP. Ernie believes he has ESP, when he's the only person in his class to guess the correct color of a card held up by his teacher. In the course of the next few days, Ernie goes on to correctly predict several more things. Ernie fantasizes about becoming famous because of his ESP. Robbie tries to tell the family that Ernie just made some lucky guesses. Ernie tells Katie that there will be a disaster if she keeps a doctor's appointment for the babies tomorrow. Robbie and Katie have a fight when she says she's not going to the doctor. They do wind up going to the doctor and nothing bad happened.
303	25	"The Matchmakers"	Fred de Cordova	Doug Tibbles	March 22, 1969	2245–0691
Charley wants to send in a picture of the triplets for a contest, but Katie and Robbie say no. Steve's new co-worker and golf buddy Harry Palmer (Don DeFore) can be a little loud and boisterous. Harry suggests that Steve, Chip and Ernie go to the company picnic with himself and his son Frankie (Teddy Eccles) and daughter Laurie. Harry says that the kids will get along great. At the picnic, the kids develop an immediate dislike for each other. That evening, both Steve and Harry are surprised when their children say they couldn't stand the others. Steve and Harry won't admit to each other that things didn't go well. The men force Chip and Laurie to go out again. Because of the other couple they're with, Chip and Laurie get picked up by the police for a curfew violation. Steve and Harry finally admit that their children don't like each other. But then both learn that Chip wants to take Laurie out again. Marcia Mae Jones as Mother.
304	26	"Ernie Is Smitten"	Fred de Cordova	Doug Tibbles	March 29, 1969	2245–0687
Ernie tells Steve that he really likes Margaret Crookshank (Julia Benjamin), but that she refuses to give him a second look. Steve suggests maybe changing his appearance to help break the ice. Ernie comes to school the next day with his hair slicked back, but Margaret still ignores him. However, Iris (Jennifer Edwards) seems to like Ernie, but he doesn't talk to her. The next day, Ernie tries to impress Margaret with a transistor radio, which doesn't work. Ernie and Margaret are to recite a poem together for class. When it comes time to do their poem, Ernie completely messes up. Chip visits Margaret's sister Gloria and asks Margaret if she likes Ernie. She says no. Chip tells Ernie that he should give Iris a chance, which he does.
305	27	"Two O'Clock Feeding"	Fred de Cordova	George Tibbles	April 5, 1969	2245–0710
The Crawfords from Bryant Park move into the neighborhood. Ernie invites them over for a Bar-B-Que. Parents Jerry (Larry Thor) and Marge (Marjorie Stapp) arrive with daughter Susan (Kimberly Beck). Robbie asks where married couple Johnny (Johnny Washbrook) and Betty (Beverly Lunsford) are. Johnny and Betty just had a baby. Marge says they'll be coming later. When they arrive, Johnny tells Robbie that Betty and him fight all the time and are separating. Robbie asks Steve to talk to Johnny. Steve learns that the stress of the baby and not much money is causing tension between the couple. Johnny sees how hectic things are around the Douglas household. Johnny has Betty talk to Steve the next day. Betty sees how hectic things are and realizes that she and Johnny should be able to handle one baby.
306	28	"Teacher's Pet"	Fred de Cordova	Freddy Rhea	April 19, 1969	2245–0704
Ernie's writing ability lands him in an advanced special English class. The class is taught by a strict teacher named Miss Houk (Sylvia Sidney). Ernie is having a hard time with his first assignment and winds up getting a failing grade on it. Next he has to recite some Shakespeare with a girl named Bunny (Lisa Eilbacher). Ernie doesn't do well with that either. Ernie wants to do something to prove to Miss Houk that he's not a bad student. He writes a really good paper, but Miss Houk thinks he copied it from somewhere. Ernie gets upset and tears the paper up in front of her. Miss Houk comes by the Douglas house to apologize to Ernie.

=== Season 10 (1969–70) ===
No. overall	No. in season	Title	Directed by	Written by	Original release date	Prod. code
307	1	"The First Meeting"	Fred de Cordova	George Tibbles	October 4, 1969	2245–0711
Robbie has graduated from college. Robbie and Katie and their three sons move out of the Douglas home and into their own apartment not far away. Katie feels Steve needs a woman in his life. She would like him to meet a friend of her mother's, Millicent Sawyer (Elaine Devry). Ernie tells Steve that his substitute teacher, Barbara Harper, would like to have a talk with him. Steve goes to Katie's and Robbie's to meet Millicent. Millicent calls Katie to inform her that while Steve is nice, she isn't interested in him. Steve meets Barbara in a high-school corridor, and the two are quickly attracted to each other. She is also a widow and she has a daughter. The two spend the rest of the day together. Robbie and Katie come by to tell Steve about Millicent and they find out he's seeing Barbara. Note: Beverly Garland's first appearance as Barbara Harper.
308	2	"Instant Co-Worker"	Fred de Cordova	George Tibbles	October 11, 1969	2245–0712
Steve's romance with Barbara continues to grow. Robbie is thinking of taking a job at Steve's firm, but would like to talk to Steve first. Robbie tells Steve to not recommend him as he wants to avoid the appearance of nepotism. Meanwhile, Barbara's mother asks if she is in love with Steve. Bob Anderson (John Gallaudet) tells Steve that he hired Robbie as a structural engineer. Bob was very impressed with Robbie. Betty Lynn as Janice Dawson, Steve's secretary. Naomi Stevens as Mama Rossini. Dawn Lyn is introduced as Barbara's daughter Dodie, and familiar character actress Eleanor Audley is cast as Barbara's mother, Mrs. Vincent.
309	3	"Is It Love?"	Fred de Cordova	George Tibbles	October 18, 1969	2245–0713
The family knows Steve is very interested in Barbara, but are surprised at the non-romantic conversations he has with her. Steve and Barbara go to Mama Rossini's restaurant, where Mama also drops a few romantic hints. Steve is home on a Friday night. Katie speaks with Steve about why he isn't out with Barbara and she suggests marriage. Steve says it's a big step. Even Barbara's mother, Mrs. Vincent, is trying to push the romance along when Barbara doesn't call Steve. Mrs. Vincent calls Steve and gets him to come over. Steve and Barbara anxiously spend the rest of the day together. That evening, Barbara finally tells Steve that if he doesn't make a move, she will. The episode ends with their first kiss.
310	4	"A Ring for Barbara"	Fred de Cordova	George Tibbles	October 25, 1969	2245–0714
Steve has bought an engagement ring and is ready to propose to Barbara. Steve gets the family together to make sure they approve of him marrying Barbara. The family is thrilled. Steve takes Barbara to Mama Rossini's restaurant. He is about to propose when the violinist starts playing at their table. Steve then takes her for drive and parks. They are interrupted by a Police Officer (Buck Young). Because Steve fits the description of a burglar in the area, he is taken to the police station. While talking to Sgt. Perkins (Stafford Repp), Steve lets it slip that he's been trying all evening to propose to Barbara. She overhears and says yes.
311	5	"The Littlest Rebel"	Fred de Cordova	George Tibbles	November 1, 1969	2245–0715
Barbara tells Steve that she would like to talk to the members of his family to make sure she and Dodie will be welcome. Everyone assures Barbara she will be more than welcome. Barbara's Mother tells her what she needed to worry about is how Dodie will feel. Dodie is not so sure she wants to share her mother. Steve comes by and Dodie shows him a picture of her real father. Steve tells Barbara that they shouldn't marry until Dodie accepts him. Steve spends the day with Dodie, but she is still very cold and distant. At the ice cream parlor, Steve lights his pipe. Dodie tells Steve that he's a nice man. Later, Barbara says that Dodie's father smoked a pipe and ate ice cream with her. Dodie starts to warm up to the idea of her mother getting married.
312	6	"Two Weeks to Go"	Fred de Cordova	George Tibbles	November 8, 1969	2245–0720
Charley reminds Steve that the wedding is two weeks away and there is still a lot to do. Steve is thinking of a small wedding with a Justice of the Peace. What he doesn't know is that Barbara is planning a large wedding with a lot of family and friends. Meanwhile, Ernie is trying to get some expert advice about Florine Dixon, a girl he is interested in. Katie learns about Barbara's large wedding plans and calls Barbara's mother to see if she has mailed the invitations yet. While at Mama Rossini's, Barbara and Steve find out each others plans. Mama overhears Barbara's call to her mother about not mailing the invitations and thinks the wedding is off. Mama eventually talks to Steve and he decides to go along with the big wedding. Barbara's mother comes up with a compromise. Ernie gets his date with Florine. Cathleen Cordell as Marcia Cummings.
313	7	"One Week to Go"	Fred de Cordova	George Tibbles	November 15, 1969	2245–0722
It's one week until the wedding. Steve and Barbara are discussing the service with Reverend Glassel (Maurice Manson). Both Steve and Barbara are starting to get the jitters. Meanwhile, Ernie, as a school project, is conditioning plants. Barbara tells Robbie and Katie that there are so many things she doesn't know about Steve. Robbie tells her things can get pretty noisy at the house, but she'll get used to it. With tensions rising, Barbara and Steve have a fight while he's giving her a golf lesson. They claim they are too set in their ways and call off the wedding. It's the middle of the night and Barbara comes over to the Douglas house. She tells Charlie she made a stupid mistake and would like to talk to Steve. But, Steve went to Barbara's house to talk to her. They finally connect and make up.
314	8	"Came the Day"	Fred de Cordova	George Tibbles	November 22, 1969	2245–0725
The Douglas men are having dinner at Mama Rossini's the night before Steve's wedding. They reminisce about how hectic things were the day of Robbie's wedding. Steve receives a touching gift from the family. The next morning the men get up early and get dressed. Robbie goes to check on the Chapel. When he returns to the house, everyone is asleep. Tramp runs off again. The men arrive at the Chapel and Steve is very nervous. Charlie, Chip and Ernie decorate Steve's car. On their way, Robbie and Katie see Tramp and pick him up. When he gets to the Chapel, Robbie asks a local boy to take the decorations off the car. The ceremony starts. The local boy lets Tramp out of Robbie's car and the dog goes into the chapel. After the service, Steve and Barbara leave for their honeymoon.
315	9	"Mexican Honeymoon"	Fred de Cordova	George Tibbles	November 29, 1969	2245–0729
Steve and Barbara arrive in a quaint village in Mexico which Steve had previously visited on a fishing trip. They expect to find the same quiet place Steve remembers and have the place virtually to themselves. They are surprised to find the village has been "put on the map" by a travel magazine and the obscure little hotel, whose name has changed from Moon Hotel to Honeymoon Hotel, is filled to capacity with young newlyweds. The Douglases are continually put upon by the young couples around them for help with everything from homesickness, to settling quarrels to ordering food. Finally, the arrival of a bottle of Champagne from the family back in California, tips off the hotel guests to the fact that Steve and Barbara are themselves newlyweds. They give them the restaurant to themselves that evening and the romantic honeymoon they anticipated finally begins. Paul Petersen as Ted Winks. Ricky Kelman as Josh Odam. Nacho Galindo as Pepe.
316	10	"After You, Alphonse"	Fred de Cordova	Lois Hire	December 13, 1969	2245–0718
Katie asks Robbie to speak to Charley about being more respectful and polite with a new woman in the house. Steve and Barbara arrive back home from their honeymoon. Charley is now overly polite to Barbara. Meanwhile, Dodie must get used to the idea of sleeping in her own room and not with Barbara. Barbara asks Katie if Charley resents her being part of the family now because he isn't acting as himself. Katie tells Robbie to have Charley to try even harder. Steve has a talk with Dodie and she starts to call him Daddy. Charley decides he can be fake polite for only so long. And Barbara is happy to have the old Charley back.
317	11	"Rough on Dodie"	Fred de Cordova	Douglas Tibbles	December 20, 1969	2245–0716
Dodie discovers that the boys can be a little rough. Barbara tries to explain to her that boys are just that way. Barbara isn't sure she should go with Steve on a planned trip to Phoenix. Steve says he'll talk to Charley and the boys. The boys try to reassure Barbara that everything will be fine while she's gone. Dodie is afraid Barbara may not come back from the trip. Dodie gets knocked down when the boys play catch in the house. She tells Katie that she hates boys. Katie has a talk with her and Dodie begins to understand.
318	12	"Silver Threads"	Fred de Cordova	Douglas Tibbles	December 27, 1969	2245–0724
Dodie tells Barbara that she is worried about going into the second grade. Meanwhile, Robbie is playfully chasing Katie around the Douglas house. Charlie, Barbara and Dodie go to Robbie's house for dinner. Charlie points out that Katie has some gray hairs. Katie now worries about getting old. Katie takes Dodie to the market where Dodie is mistaken for her daughter. Katie then runs into old high school classmate Marvin Horndiffer (Lou Cutell), who is now bald. Now Katie worries even more about old age and thinks about having a plan for retirement. Dodie says she's not going to second grade and she sneaks out of the house. She winds up at Robbie's house. After talking to Dodie, Katie realizes she should live in the present and not worry about the future so much.
319	13	"It's a Woman's World"	Fred de Cordova	Si Rose	January 3, 1970	2245–0721
Chip babysits the triplets while Robbie and Katie go to the movies. When the couple return, Robbie is angry. Katie only agreed to see the movie because she wanted to go to a shoe sale near the movie theater. Robbie tells Steve that women know how to manipulate men. Barbara invites Steve to meet her and Dodie for lunch. When he arrives at the "Pink Parakeet" he realizes he is the only man in the very feminine restaurant. Dodie tells Steve she's needs a male family member to be a tree in a school play. When none of the other guys will do it, Steve volunteers to be the tree. Robbie still thinks Steve was manipulated, but Steve says when love's involved it doesn't matter.
320	14	"Table for Eight"	Fred de Cordova	Bob Touchstone	January 10, 1970	2245–0723
Steve mentions to Barbara that she hasn't met any of his executive friend's wives. Barbara suggests he invite some of them over for dinner. But she immediately starts to worry as she wants everything to be perfect. Barbara has a dream about getting ready for the dinner, with things going wrong and Charley as a fussy maid. As the day of the dinner approaches, Barbara gets more and more anxious. While at work, Steve learns that he and Bob Anderson (John Gallaudet) will have to fly out for a project and the dinner will have to be cancelled. Due to bad weather, the flight gets cancelled. Steve suggests that the men still bring their wives over for dinner. Barbara now has about an hour to prepare the meal. Everyone pitches in to help. Steve's friends and their wives all have a wonderful evening.
321	15	"Double Jealousy"	Fred de Cordova	Rocci Chatfield	January 17, 1970	2245–0717
Robbie arrives at the office and is in need of a technical secretary for some work he has to do. Attractive Maureen Morgan (Brenda Benet) shows up to help Robbie. Robbie is at first taken by her sex appeal, but learns she is quite efficient. Katie has Charley look after the triplets so she can have lunch with Rob. Katie arrives and finds Maureen fussing over Rob, who has completely forgotten lunch. That night Katie and Robbie have a fight. Barbara tells Katie she's making too much of the situation. Maureen is now assigned to help Steve with a project. Meanwhile, Steve develops gout in his foot and will have to stay in bed for a few days. Maureen shows up at the house to work with Steve. Barbara catches Maureen fussing over Steve and now it's Barbara's turn to be jealous. Steve is finally back at the office and Barbara comes by. Maureen tells Barbara that she's being transferred. Barbara gives her some advice and Maureen winds up staying.
322	16	"Dodie's Tonsils"	Fred de Cordova	Doug Tibbles	January 24, 1970	2245–0728
Rob and Katie are going on vacation in Mexico, so they leave the triplets with Barbara and Charley. Dr. Roy Conlin (Roy Roberts) drops by the Douglas house to check Dodie's tonsils. Dr. Roy says Dodie will go to the hospital the next day to have them removed. Dodie asks Steve if he will stay with her at the hospital. Meanwhile in Mexico, all Katie can do is worry about the babies. On the way to the hospital, Steve sprains his ankle. The Welcome Lady (Jane Dulo) of the hospital visits Dodie. Later that evening, Steve is surprised by the family and the triplets in the hospital. Dr. Conlin says it's just respiratory congestion and it would be easier to treat them in the hospital. Dodie's operation is successful. Days later, Robbie and Katie come home and everyone is fine. Sarah Selby as Nurse #1. Ann McCrea as Nurse #2. Virginia Capers as Nurse #3.
323	17	"Who Is Sylvia?"	Fred de Cordova	George Tibbles	January 31, 1970	2245–0734
Steve's old friend Sylvia Cannon (Jane Wyman), now a rich divorcee, comes to town. She learns that Steve is now married. Steve would like Sylvia to meet Barbara. Everyone in the family is thrilled to see Sylvia, making Barbara feel out of place. Sylvia mentions that she'll be living in town from now on. Steve is going to play golf with Sylvia and Barbara is starting to get jealous. Even Katie wonders why Robbie speaks so fondly of Sylvia. Barbara finally sees that Sylvia really seems to be "one of the boys" and not a potential rival.
324	18	"You Can't Go Home"	Fred de Cordova	George Tibbles	February 7, 1970	2245–0733
Phil Rankin (Yale Summers), an old friend from Bryant Park, asks Rob to be best man at his marriage. Rob asks Barbara and Charley to watch the triplets. Robbie is looking forward to showing Katie the town and his old friends. Steve thinks Rob's going to be disappointed because things never stay the same. When Robbie and Katie get to the hotel, Robbie recognizes Everett Mindermann (Olan Soule) the clerk, but he doesn't remember Rob. The town seems smaller to Robbie. The next day Rob takes Katie to his old high school. They run into a teacher of Rob's, Mrs. Showfield (Natalie Masters), but she doesn't really remember him. Many other things in town have changed. Phil comes by and tells Rob that the wedding is off. Before they leave for home, Rob takes Katie to his old house. Rob is happy to see that it hasn't changed. Turns out it's now owned by old friends Hal and Julie Cornell, who actually recognized Robbie. Burt Mustin as Old Man. Robert Broyles as Policeman. Charles Lampkin as Mailman. Gary Grimes as Student.
325	19	"Guest in the House"	Fred de Cordova	Lois Hire	February 14, 1970	2245–0731
Steve leaves on another business trip. Barbara's mother notices that when Steve is gone, the boys go to Charley for everything. Barbara says it's normal that the boys don't think of her as their mother. But, she does feel left out. Meanwhile, Chip has been studying with Sally Crane, who is very smart. Mrs. Henson, their teacher, thinks that Chip may have cheated on a test when his answers are almost exactly like Sally's. She does believe them when they explain that they are studying together. Barbara still dwells on the fact that the boys never consult her. Another teacher, Joan Terry, accuses Chip of cheating. Right in front of Barbara, Chip asks Robbie's advice about Mrs. Terry's accusation. Bill Crane (William Mims), Sally's father, tells Barbara that he's not happy about Chip getting Sally in trouble at school. Mrs. Terry gives both Chip and Sally a failing grade for the semester. Barbara confronts Mrs. Terry, loses her composure and insists that Chip didn't cheat. Steve and Barbara later learn that Mrs. Terry backed down and Chip calls Barbara "mom" for the first time.
326	20	"Charley's Cello"	Fred de Cordova	Ramey Idriss	February 21, 1970	2245–0732
It's a Saturday night and Charley is home alone, playing his cello. Barbara and Dodie return from a movie and listen to some of Charley's playing. Barbara mentions to Steve that she thinks Charley is lonely. Barbara finds Effie Springer (Winifred Deforest Coffin), a woman violist, to play with Charley. Charley tells Rob and Katie that he isn't thrilled with Effie. Though unimpressed with the music, Rob and Katie urge Charley to keep playing. Barbara tells Steve that she has formed "The O'Casey String Quartet" and she will get them some jobs. Charley tells Steve to talk to Barbara, because he is not interested in playing in the group. But then Charley meets Monica Bradley, one of the violinists, and is quite taken with her. Charley learns that Monica is engaged. When there's a conflict over the tempo of a song, Effie tells Barbara that she is kicking Charley out of the group. Barbara finally gets up the nerve to tell Charley. Charley plays with Rob, Chip and Ernie in a jazzy up-tempo quartet.
327	21	"The Honeymoon Is Over"	Fred de Cordova	George Tibbles	February 28, 1970	2245–0736
A special project at the plant keeps Steve and Robbie working long hours and they come home exhausted every night. They even have to work over the weekend. Steve can't complain to the boss because he's the supervisor of the project. Barbara is thrilled when Steve calls and says they are going out to dinner with Robbie and Katie. Barbara and Katie get dressed up and leave to meet the men at Mama Rossini's restaurant. The men arrive late and tired and the women take them home without eating. The next day the project is almost finished. Steve's secretary Janice decides to throw a celebration party. Barbara and Katie decide to surprise the men and bring them some food. But they are the ones surprised when they see the party going on. The women leave angry. The men come home, explain the party and the wives make up with them. Robert Brubaker as Carl Jason.
328	22	"Baubles, Bangles and Beatrice"	Fred de Cordova	Doug Tibbles	March 7, 1970	2245–0735
Barbara is called in to work as Chip's substitute history teacher. Meanwhile, Dodie's brings home her 6-year-old friend Beatrice (Victoria Paige Meyerink). After meeting Ernie, Beatrice develops a case of puppy-love for him. Ernie tries to talk to Steve about Beatrice, but she keeps calling him. Chip tells Steve how strict Barbara is in class and he's not sure how to act as everyone knows she's his mother. During class, Barbara keeps putting Chip on the spot. Beatrice is invited to stay at the Douglas house for the weekend. While there, she follows Ernie everywhere. Steve tells Chip to discuss his how he feels with Barbara. Arthur Morgan, a delivery boy, comes by and recognizes Barbara as a teacher he once had. He tells Chip she was strict, but she was the only teacher he actually learned anything from. Chip decides to not say anything to Barbara. While Ernie is asleep, Beatrice kisses him. She now says she's fallen out of love with him.
329	23	"Mister X"	Fred de Cordova	Lois Hire	March 14, 1970	2245–0719
Mark Tanner (Charles Bateman) puts Steve on a Top Secret project. Mark wants Steve to work on it from home. If Steve sees anyone suspicious, he is to call Mark immediately. When Steve comes home, Ernie jokes about a secret project. Chips thinks Ernie's seen too many spy movies. The next day Ernie spots a man in a car and thinks he's watching the house. Later, the man finds Charley in the park and asks a lot of questions about Steve. While looking for a pencil in Steve's room, Dodie finds a model of the secret project and takes it. Steve gets the model back from Dodie. Ernie shows Steve the man watching the house from the car. Steve calls Mark about the man and Mark comes by the house. As Mark is about to leave, the man shows up at the doorstep. The man turns out to be Barbara's former father-in-law, Professor Harper (Lew Ayres). He just wanted to see what kind of family Barbara married into.
330	24	"Dodie's Dilemma"	Fred de Cordova	Lois Hire	March 21, 1970	2245–0727
Judge Markham (Jon Lormer) presides over Steve formally adopting Dodie. At school, Dodie is harassed by a mean-spirited girl named Victoria Lewis. One morning, Dodie pretends to be sick. Barbara finds a way to get her to go to school. Chip and Ernie figure out that Dodie is being picked on and speak to her. Chip and Ernie have a little talk with Victoria and say that they'd hate to see anyone picking on Dodie. Dodie now uses the big brother defense to make Victoria and the other girls afraid of her. Pauline Lewis (Patience Cleveland), Victoria's mother, comes to speak with Barbara. Pauline believes that Victoria is afraid of Dodie and it's causing her bad dreams. Steve and Barbara find out that Chip and Ernie had something to do with the problem. The boys find a way to make things right and Dodie and Victoria become friends. Note: Erin Moran, who would become famous as Joanie Cunningham on Happy Days, guest stars.
331	25	"Love Thy Neighbor"	Fred de Cordova	Gwen Bagni & Paul Dubov	March 28, 1970	2245–0730
Rob and Katie meet their new neighbors, Joe (Jerry Mathers) and Eve Lawrie (Lori Martin). They have a daughter named Katie. While having dinner at Steve's house, Rob and Katie can talk about nothing but how much they like Joe and Eve. Meanwhile, Dodie is sad that her "sister" Katie doesn't have time to play with her. It doesn't take long for tensions to develop between the two couples. Rob tells Steve that they may have to move because of the Lawrie's. Steve, Barbara and Dodie go to Rob's place for dinner. Steve asks Rob if there were any way to patch thing up with the Lawrie's. Katie apologizes to Dodie for not acting more like a sister. Joe and Eve come by and the two couples make up.
332	26	"J.P. Douglas"	Fred de Cordova	B.W. Sandefur	April 4, 1970	2245–0726
Chip talks to members of the family about high finance, earning money and saving money. Chip shows his financial growth chart to Steve and Barbara. Ernie tells Charley that Chip has become boring and annoying. Beside money from his rock band, Chip takes a job at a local movie theater. But soon, some unforeseen expenses pop up and Chip winds up with very little money. On his way home, Chip finds a wallet full of money. Mr. Garrison stops by the Douglas house and talks to Steve. He tells Steve what an honest boy Chip is, because he returned the wallet to him.

=== Season 11 (1970–71) ===
No. overall	No. in season	Title	Directed by	Written by	Original release date	Prod. code
333	1	"The First Anniversary"	Fred de Cordova	George Tibbles	September 19, 1970	2245–0737
Chip meets Polly Williams at college and introduces her to the family. Rob asks Steve and Barbara what they are going to do for their one year anniversary. Steve says their just going to have a quiet dinner together. Meanwhile, Polly's father, Tom, worries that she is spending too much time with Chip. Dodie decides she wants to give Steve and Barbara a surprise party. But she does not tell anyone where it is at, or what time. The morning of the anniversary, Dodie lets it slip to her parents that she is having a party. Everyone has other plans, but Steve tells them he doesn't want Dodie hurt and they have to show up. At the party, Dodie sees all the nice presents the family brought and runs off. She is sad because her present was homemade, but Steve and Barbara tell her they love it. Note: Ronne Troup joins the cast as Chip's girlfriend Polly, and Doris Singleton and Norman Alden appear as her strict parents, Tom and Margaret Williams.
334	2	"The Once Over"	Fred de Cordova	George Tibbles	September 26, 1970	2245–0739
Chip and Polly are dating. Everyone but Steve thinks the couple are getting serious. Polly's father Tom goes to Steve's office and introduces himself. Steve has a meeting to go to, so there's no time to talk. Barbara wonders why Tom came by and Steve mentions how Tom made a bad first impression. After speaking to Ernie about Chip and Polly, Barbara tells Steve they might be worrying over nothing. Margaret calls Barbara and asks would she and Steve come to dinner. Polly is afraid her strict father will ruin things for her and Chip. At dinner, Steve and Tom have an uncomfortable talk about Chip and Polly. Steve says he trusts Chip. Meanwhile, Chip is shaken when Polly suggests they elope. Chip tells Steve what happened and that he told Polly the idea was weird. Chip says that he's not getting married, but the idea doesn't bother him anymore. Steve has another uncomfortable conversation with Tom. Steve flashes back to when Chip was younger.
335	3	"The Return of Albert"	Fred de Cordova	George Tibbles	October 3, 1970	2245–0738
Barbara receives a call from an old college boyfriend named Albert Conway (Craig Stevens). Albert also talks to Steve who proceeds to invite him over for dinner. Barbara is anxious and Steve is curious to see what Albert is like. Albert shows up and is as handsome as ever. At dinner, Steve asks Albert if he would like to join him in a golf game. When alone, Albert asks Barbara if she would have married him if he had come back from Vietnam right away. She tells him she doesn't know. While Steve and Albert are golfing, Rob and Katie ask Barbara how the dinner went. After meeting Albert, Katie mentions how good looking he is and Rob says that Steve must like him. Steve learns Barbara and Albert actually have know each other since junior high. The more Barbara and Albert reminisce about the past, the more annoyed and jealous Steve gets. Later, Steve admits to a little jealousy. "Welcome to the human race" Barbara tells Steve with a smile as they snuggle up together.
336	4	"The Non-Proposal"	Fred de Cordova	George Tibbles	October 10, 1970	2245–0744
Chip gives Polly a necklace and locket for her birthday. Chip tells Barbara and Steve that he and Polly are going steady. Polly thinks that she and Chip are engaged and tells her mother. Polly and Margaret agree not to mention anything about the engagement to her father. Chip goes to lunch with Polly and Margaret. Margaret asks him about his and Polly's "arrangement", which he takes to mean about them going steady. Tom sees them at the restaurant and becomes suspicious. Tom confronts Steve once again at work and says he thinks Chip and Polly are engaged. While on a date, Polly mentions to Chip that they are engaged, surprising Chip. Chip feels better after getting some advice from Steve and Barbara. Tom comes over to the Douglas house and says they need to break Chip and Polly up. Barbara tells him off.
337	5	"Polly Wants A Douglas"	Fred de Cordova	George Tibbles	October 17, 1970	2245–0746
Chip gets a job as a box boy at a supermarket. Barbara wonder's why he needs the extra money. Meanwhile, Tom is still not happy with the amount of time Chip and Polly spend together. Margaret tells Barbara that Chip and Polly have opened a joint bank account. Margaret doesn't want Tom to find out about it. When Tom finds out that Chip has a job, he confronts Polly. They have a fight and Polly tells him about the bank account. She leaves and goes to the Douglas' home with a suitcase. Chip and Polly have a fight when Chip turns down her offer to elope. Polly sneaks back into her house and tells her father she never wants to see Chip again. Chip gets some advice from Katie about what he should do about Polly. Rob tells Katie they're going to Rome. Tom comes to the Douglas house to tell Steve and Barbara that Chip and Polly have broken up. But then the young couple walk in hand in hand.
338	6	"The Cat Burglars"	Fred de Cordova	George Tibbles	October 31, 1970	2245–0745
Bob Anderson's wife Sylvia is having a costume party for the executives at the office. Barbara rents cat costumes for her and Steve. Katie rents the same costumes for her and Rob. Polly tells Chip that there is so much fun and love in the Douglas family and she wants to be part of it. The two are doing homework late into the night. Tom calls wanting Polly home. Charley tells Tom off. After the costume party, the two couples find that the car is out of gas. Steve decides to walk to a gas station. Along the way, Steve stops at a couple houses asking to use the phone, but the people just slam the door in his face. Rob discovers that the car had a clogged fuel line and gets it running. Steve is stopped by the police. He doesn't have any identification because it is with Barbara. Rob, Katie and Barbara look for Steve and when they can't find him, they head home. The police take Steve to Bob's house where Bob tells the police who Steve is. Steve finally makes it home.
339	7	"The Elopement"	Fred de Cordova	George Tibbles	November 7, 1970	2245–0747
Chip and Polly are parked in his car having a conversation. They notice a man (Sidney Clute) parked near them and realize they've seen him a couple times before. When the man follows the couple back to the Douglas house, Steve confronts him. They find out he's a Private Detective, but he won't say who hired him. The Detective says he's taking himself off the case and they won't see him anymore. Chip and Polly agree to elope. Chip tells Steve their plans. Steve reluctantly gives his permission, but says that they should mention it to Tom as well. Chip goes to the Williams home and finds out that Tom had him and Polly followed. Chip leaves without mentioning the elopement and Margaret is mad at Tom. That night, Chip goes to pick up Polly and leaves a note for his parents. Much later that evening, Tom calls Steve. Steve tells him Chip and Polly eloped and Tom and Margaret come over. Tom says he'll have it annulled, but Margaret tells him she gave the couple her permission.
340	8	"The Honeymoon"	Fred de Cordova	George Tibbles	November 14, 1970	2245–0754
Chip and Polly are married and on their way to Mexico for their honeymoon. They encounter some car trouble. As a wedding present, the mechanic doesn't charge them too much. Back home, Steve reminisces to Barbara about the time Chip as a child had a girlfriend. Chip's car runs out of gas. A man named Paco (Natividad Vacío) comes by and tells them that gas is far away. Paco does help them get to their destination. Rob and Katie find out that Chip eloped. Chip and Polly will be staying at the same hotel Steve and Barbara stayed on their honeymoon a year earlier. When they try to get their room, they find out the hotel is now a singles hotel. They have to spend their first married night in separate rooms. The next day, Pepe the manager arranges for Chip and Polly to have a room together. Chip talks to a Harold Fletcher who says his 4 year marriage has not been great. Harold says he got married too young and Chip should "run for the hills". But something Chip says makes Harold decide to give his marriage a chance. Veronica Cartwright as Ruth Fletcher. Robert Broyles as Max. Bobby Diamond as Mike Wiggins. Note: In a remembrance by Steve, long forgotten son Mike is sort of mentioned.
341	9	"One By One They Go"	Fred de Cordova	George Tibbles	November 21, 1970	2245–0755
Chip and Polly are expected home from their honeymoon soon. The families are giving them a surprise welcome back party, but the couple are running late. Everyone is there except Tom. The couple finally arrives. The next day, Chip packs his things to move into the college dorm with Polly. Tom is still upset that Polly eloped. Chip and Polly have Steve and Barbara over for dinner. Polly is sad that her father hasn't spoken to her since they've been back. Chip goes to speak with Tom. Tom says that while he loves Polly, he's been hurt. Margaret is not happy with the way Tom acted. That night, Tom comes by the dorm. He claims that his car broke down not far away. Tom notices that Polly has a picture of him up. He admits that his car didn't break down and he and Polly hug. Note: Final appearance of Polly's parents.
342	10	"My Four Women"	Fred de Cordova	Bob Touchstone	November 28, 1970	2245–0751
Barbara volunteers to organize a fashion show for a local woman's club. Barbara needs a male model. Katie asks Rob. He reluctantly agrees, not knowing he'll have to walk the runway. The day before the show, Rob comes down sick. Believing he only has to pose for some pictures, Steve tells Barbara he'll do it. Edie Trunchell (Dorothy Green) and Mr. Felix (Maurice Marsac) come by to measure Steve. Steve arrives at the show and is made to wear a very lacy and ruffled outfit. He learns from Mr. Felix that he'll be walking the runway. Steve tells Barbara he will not do it. The waiter fills in for Steve and the show goes well. Later, after learning about a misunderstanding, Steve feels bad and apologizes to Barbara. Yvette Vickers as First Model.
343	11	"The Bride Went Home"	Fred de Cordova	George Tibbles	December 5, 1970	2245–0761
Polly calls Barbara and tells her how sick Chip is after eating Polly's dinner the night before. Barbara tells her that if Chip isn't better after a while, call the doctor. Steve calls and tells Polly that Chip was allergic to green beans when he was younger. Turns out that what Polly fed him. The next day Polly talks to Katie and sees Katie and Rob have a little issue. After a talk with Ernie, Polly feels maybe Chip got married only to be polite. Chip tells Polly that while at school, he passed out and they had to pump his stomach. The next day, Chip is sick again. Doctor Anderson (Carleton Young) comes by and tells Polly not to worry. Polly tells Chip she's no good for him. Polly talks to Steve and says that because she's no good for Chip, she's leaving him. That night after Chip falls asleep, Polly writes him a note and leaves the dorm room. She only takes a few steps before she goes back.
344	12	"The Power of Suggestion"	Fred de Cordova	Doug Tibbles	December 12, 1970	2245–0740
Dr. Anderson comes by to look at Charley's sprained big toe. He tells Charley to get a cane. Meanwhile, Ernie is working on a psychology project with Paula Harvey. It's about the power of suggestion and Ernie uses some of the family as guinea pigs. Ernie tries to make Dodie believe her doll Myrtle is now a book. That night Dodie can't sleep and Steve tells Ernie to bring Myrtle back. Ernie can't find the doll. Ernie cuts Charley's cane a little bit at a time, and Charley thinks he is getting taller. Ernie now wants to try to make Steve believe that the ketchup is sweeter. Paula thinks Ernie is going to far. At dinner, Ernie mentions how farmers are growing a sweeter tomato. Steve asks who put the sugar in the ketchup. Steve catches Ernie cutting Charley's cane. Ernie finds Myrtle and then has to explain to Steve about his project. Steve finds a way to teach Ernie a lesson.
345	13	"St. Louis Blues"	Fred de Cordova	Lois Hire	December 19, 1970	2245–0748
Rob and Katie's anniversary is coming up and the triplets are wearing them down. As a present, Katie's mother, Lorraine, offers to take the triplets with her to St. Louis for a month. Despite Rob and Katie going out for several nights, Charley says within two weeks they'll want the kids back. Steve and Barbara spend several nights with Rob and Katie. Steve and Barbara can't keep up that pace and they miss the boys. Katie wonders how the boys are doing. Meanwhile, Lorraine has her hands full with the triplets. Steve has to take a business trip that will take him by St. Louis. Steve stops by Lorraine's house and they both agree it's time for the boys to come home. Lorraine brings the boys home and Rob and Katie are thrilled. Note: Joan Tompkins' final appearance as Katie's mom Lorraine.
346	14	"The Liberty Bell"	Fred de Cordova	Doug Tibbles	January 2, 1971	2245–0749
Charley complains about the family being in a dull routine. Rob's childhood friend Jim Bell (Sal Mineo) stops by the Douglas house. Jim is quite the free-spirit and just rode his motorcycle up from Mexico. He is surprised to learn that Rob has a job as an engineer, is married and has triplets. Jim visits Steve and Rob at their job. Jim regales Rob with exciting tales of traveling the world and seeing the sights. Katie is not as impressed with Jim's stories as Rob is. Rob tells Katie that he is going to take a week-long motorcycle trip to the Colorado River with Jim. Katie is not happy about the trip, but lets Rob go. Rob and Jim leave for their trip, but it's not long after that Jim drops Rob off back home.
347	15	"The Love God"	Fred de Cordova	Doug Tibbles	January 9, 1971	2245–0743
It's Dodie's first day in the upper-second grade. Dodie's class has a new teacher named Mike Turley (Peter Brown). All the girls think he's handsome and Dodie develops a real crush on him. Dodie tries making some cookies for Mr. Turley, but it doesn't go well. Steve talks with Dodie about Mr. Turley. At school, Dodie gets her head stuck between two fence bars. Mr. Turley comforts her while the janitor frees her. Barbara comes to the school and realizes that she used to teach Mike when he was younger. Barbara invites him over for dinner. Dodie is all excited and dressed up for Mr. Turley. When Mike arrives he introduces his fiancée Ann Carter (Linda Foster). At dinner, Mike mentions how he had a crush on Barbara when he first met her. Dodie's crush fades when Mike kisses Ann. Note: A young Jodie Foster and Victoria Paige Meyerink appear as two of Dodie's classmates.
348	16	"The New Vice-President"	Fred de Cordova	Lois Hire	January 16, 1971	2245–0752
Steve wonders why he is excluded from a board meeting at work. What he doesn't know is that they are discussing making him vice-president. But there must be an investigation first. Barbara thinks she knows what's going on and is concerned about Charley being questioned. Meanwhile, Barbara believes a vice-president should have a new suit. But there are conflicting opinions on what color it should be. Barbara is worried about getting together with the wives of the board members. Katie gives her some information on each that she got from Rob's secretary. After tea with the wives, Barbara believes that Steve will get the job. Two weeks pass and Steve hasn't been told anything. Bob Anderson speaks to Charley and verifies that Charley was in a lot of trouble while in the Merchant Marines. Despite this, the board informs Steve that he is made vice-president. Byron Morrow as Joe Marvin. Jeanne Bates as Dr. Louise Larson. Rolfe Sedan as Gus Sommers.
349	17	"Robbie's Honey"	Fred de Cordova	Arthur Sheekman	January 23, 1971	2245–0753
Rob comes home very late from work one night. At breakfast, Rob tears off a piece of newspaper because he spilled honey on it. Katie and Barbara find out it was an article about a raid at a bachelor party and wonders why Rob would tear it out. Rob's secretary Cynthia tells him she'll be going to Hawaii to get married and will be quitting her job. Rob gives her a congratulations kiss and Steve happens to see him. Cynthia gives Rob the phone number of the girl that will be replacing her. A slightly suspicious Steve asks Rob to lunch. Rob mentions Cynthia and is about to tell Steve her news when he is interrupted by another man. Katie notices that Rob doesn't have his wedding ring on, but won't let Rob explain why. The next day at Steve's house, Rob tries to tell Katie he was having the ring enlarged, but she again won't listen to him. Katie finds the phone number of Rob's new secretary. She has Barbara call and they hear a woman's voice. Steve and Rob piece together why Katie might be mad at Rob. Steve then explains the innocent misunderstandings and unspoken accusations to Barbara and Katie.
350	18	"Ernie Drives"	Fred de Cordova	Paul West	January 30, 1971	2245–0756
Ernie tells Steve about an upcoming school dance and wants to know if he could borrow the car. Ernie says that he and his friend "Yo-Ho" Crocker (Butch Patrick) are taking their driving tests on Friday. Yo-Ho comes by the house and Ernie introduces him to the family. Yo-Ho turns out to be quite the smooth talker. Later, Yo-Ho has no trouble asking Marilyn out. Ernie has a hard time asking Nina to the dance, but thanks to Yo-Ho a date is made. Ernie and Yo-Ho make plans for the night of the dance. Yo-Ho has to show Ernie how to slow dance. Barbara takes the boys for their drivers test. Ernie and Yo-Ho fail the written part of the test. Because no one else knows they flunked, Yo-Ho comes up with a plan to make it look as though they're letting the girls drive. After the dance, Ernie has a hard time giving Nina a kiss. What Yo-Ho didn't figure into his plan was how to get back home with the car. An Officer (John Carter) comes by and Ernie explains the situation. The Officer drives the boys home.
351	19	"Dodie Goes Downtown"	Fred de Cordova	Doug Tibbles & Dennis Whitcomb	February 6, 1971	2245–0742
Steve and Barbara are going for the weekend to San Francisco for a golf tournament. Charley will be going to a music festival on Saturday. Ernie is left in charge of watching Dodie. Dodie's friend Priscilla Webber (Tracie Savage) comes over. Priscilla is a bit of an instigator. Ernie agrees to let the two go to the store for ice cream. The girls decide to take a bus downtown and do some shopping. Four hours later, Ernie calls Rob and Katie who go looking for them. The girls spend all their money. Mrs. Webber (Ann McCrea) calls Ernie about Priscilla and finds out the girls are missing. Ernie has notified the police and Steve and Barbara come back from their trip. Mrs. Webber comes by quite upset. The girls ask a Cabbie (Vince Howard) if he could take them home. Despite not knowing their address, the Cabbie manages to get them home.
352	20	"The Recital"	Fred de Cordova	Doug Tibbles	February 20, 1971	2245–0757
Dodie is taking piano lessons from Mrs. Pomeroy (Ann Doran). Meanwhile, Ernie's friend Neal (Jon Walmsley) speaks to Barbara about his shyness problem. Barbara thinks Neal is hiding behind his long hair. Dodie and her friends Susan and Margaret rehearse at the Douglas house, but their off-key playing drives everyone crazy. Dodie tells Steve and Barbara that her trio will be in a recital. At the recital rehearsal, Dodie's trio practices first. All the other children laugh at them, but Mrs. Pomeroy tells them to keep playing. Dodie tells Barbara that she won't play at the recital. Neal tells Dodie something that changes her mind. The night of the recital, Susan and Margaret get stage fright and can't perform. Steve and Barbara talk Dodie into playing anyway. Ernie and Neal show up to the recital. Because Dodie can overcome her fear, Neal has had his hair cut to overcome his shyness. Dodie performs with Steve and Charley. Note: Jodie Foster and Victoria Paige Meyerink appear (barely) as members of Dodie's group.
353	21	"Debbie"	Fred de Cordova	Doug Tibbles	February 27, 1971	2245–0760
Ernie is involved in a fender-bender, when teenage girl Debbie O'Riley (Brooke Bundy) hits his car. She fender is banged up, but Ernie's car is OK. When Ernie introduces himself, she makes a big deal out of meeting "the" Ernie Douglas. Debbie comes by the house and fawn's all over Ernie, Steve and Charley. They invite her to dinner. Barbara tells Steve that Debbie seems a bit fake. Barbara won't say anything to Ernie because he clearly likes her. The Douglas men offer to fix Debbie's car. The Douglas women see through Debbie's act. After the car is fixed, Ernie asks Debbie out, but she says she can't and leaves. Ernie tells the men he's in love. Ernie calls Debbie several times, but she doesn't return any of his calls. A John Corey comes by the Douglas house and thanks them for fixing the car. He tells them that he is engaged to Debbie. Ernie realizes that they were all manipulated.
354	22	"Fit the Crime"	Fred de Cordova	George Tibbles	March 6, 1971	2245–0759
Rob, Chip and Ernie are trying to fix a guitar amplifier. Barbara is going out shopping and wants Ernie to keep an eye on Dodie. Dodie asks if she can visit a friend and, while still busy with the amplifier, Ernie says OK. Meanwhile, a girl Ernie's been trying to get a date with, finally says yes. Barbara comes home and asks where Dodie is. Ernie can't remember which friend she went to see. When Ernie remembers the name, Barbara is mad because Dodie would have to cross 3 streets to get to that house. Ernie is about to leave for his afternoon date, but Barbara confines him to his room for the rest of the day. Dodie gets confined to her room as well. Dodie catches Ernie sneaking out of his room. After he is gone, Barbara catches Dodie trying to sneak out of Ernie's room as well. Barbara is there waiting for Ernie when he sneaks back in from his date. That night, Barbara has a dream that the roles are reversed. Dodie tells Steve to watch over Barbara. Barbara asks Steve if she can go to a friends house. The dream goes on the same way the real life situation happened, except Steve and Barbara don't get punished. When she wakes up, Barbara wonders whether she did the right thing, but realizes she did.
355	23	"The Return of Terrible Tom"	Fred de Cordova	Lois Hire	March 13, 1971	2245–0741
Charley looks forward to a visit from his former shipmate Tom Kubinsky (Arthur Hunnicutt). Charley tells Barbara and Dorothy Danson what a rowdy guy Tom was. Barbara says he may have changed after all this time, but Charley doesn't believe it. Tom arrives and Charley is stunned to see how well dressed and polite he is. Charley has Tom stay at the Douglas house. That night, Tom tells Charley he's just too old for the things they used to do. He doesn't even like to dwell on the past. After Dorothy and Charley play a duet, Tom tells Charley how nice Dorothy is. Dorothy tell Barbara how much she likes Tom. Charley shows up at Rob and Katie's house saying he's moved out. Tom tells Steve that he'll try and rectify his difference with Charley. Charley realizes he's in the way at Rob's house and goes to Chip's place. Chip tells Charley he knows he left the house because Tom stole Dorothy away from him. Charlie wants to fight Tom, but Steve tells them to talk it out. Charlie and Tom reminisce about old times.
356	24	"After the Honeymoon"	Fred de Cordova	George Tibbles	March 20, 1971	2245–0762
Robbie is laid off at the plant. He tells Steve that he's been given another job in San Francisco. Charley is upset because the triplets are moving away. In San Francisco, Rob and Katie are having a hard time finding an apartment until they meet Cleo Mortensen (Pat Carroll). They meet their new neighbor Clark Sullivan (Mike Minor), who is in show business as a singer. Willis Mortenson (Richard X. Slattery), Cleo's husband, is not thrilled about the triplets. Every time he wants to bring it up to Rob, Rob shows him things that are wrong with the apartment. Katie is worried that she and the boys are putting an extra burden on Rob. Katie meets Ellie Kopsing (Sherry Alberoni), Tracy Lee, Wilma Chambers and Sherry Cross (Karen Carlson). Rob has a rough first day at work and Katie again gets worried. Something Sherry says makes Katie worry even more. Steve makes a surprise visit and Katie tells him how she feels. Steve makes Katie feel better. Notes: This was intended to be a pilot for a spin off series that CBS passed on. Final appearance of Don Grady as Robbie.

=== Season 12 (1971–72) ===
No. overall	No. in season	Title	Directed by	Written by	Original release date	Prod. code
357	1	"The Advent of Fergus"	Earl Bellamy	George Tibbles	September 13, 1971	2245–0764
Steve tells co-worker Tom that Robbie has taken a job in Peru. Katie and the triplets have moved in with the Douglas family. Steve's cousin Fergus McBain Douglas, who looks just like him, arrives from Scotland. Fergus asks a surprised Barbara where his room is. Charley meets Fergus and learns that Fergus will be rooming with him. Charley doesn't quite like Fergus and his condescending ways. Fergus stops by Steve's office and tells him he's concerned because he doesn't have an heir. He came to America in search of a wife to take back with him. Charley gets upset when Fergus asks his girlfriend Dorothy personal questions. Despite not liking him very much, Katie is surprised to see how well Fergus interacts with her triplets. Note: Fergus is played by MacMurray, with an uncredited Alan Caillou dubbing his Scottish burr.
358	2	"Fergus for Sale"	Earl Bellamy	George Tibbles	September 20, 1971	2245–0765
Charley asks Fergus what kind of woman he would like for a wife. Terri Dowling (Anne Francis) arrives at the Douglas house and speaks with Steve. Terri says she's a waitress at a local bowling alley. Steve has no idea why she is there until she asks him if he's the one looking for a wife. As Fergus is asleep, Terri will have to come back. Barbara and Katie find out Charley put an add in the local paper seeking a wife for Fergus. It's not long before there's a whole room full of women wanting to see Fergus. None of those women appealed to Fergus. Barbara tells him he needs to find someone he loves. Terri comes back and she thinks she's talking to Steve again, but it's actually Fergus. Fergus tells Steve he would like to see Terri again. Fergus overhears Charley tell Barbara that he would do anything to get rid of Fergus. Fergus is about to leave, but he and Charley come to an understanding. Lois January as Second Woman.
359	3	"Lady Douglas"	Earl Bellamy	George Tibbles	September 27, 1971	2245–0766
Terri comes by and says to Steve that she can tell he doesn't think much of her. She says he shouldn't worry because she really likes Fergus. Barbara and Katie meet Terri and think she's nice. Steve is not convinced. Fergus and Terri go to the bowling alley, where she works, and have dinner. After dinner, Terri drives Fergus to a quiet romantic place. Fergus shows Terri a ring with his family crest on it. She tells Fergus she can't except it. Fergus tells her that he loves her and she kisses him. Steve goes to the bowling alley and speaks to Jonas Tevron (Frank De Vol), a friend of Terri's. Steve asks him about Terri and finds out some concerning things. Terri comes by and hears Steve's objections about her and Fergus. She shows Steve that she is wearing Fergus' ring. Terri comes by the house. She thinks she talking to Fergus, but it's Steve, and confesses a lot of bad things about herself. Despite loving him, she doesn't think she is worthy of him. Steve tells her to put the ring back on because she is worthy of being Lady Douglas. Janice Carroll as Magda. Charles Lampkin as Chef Harry West.
360	4	"Goodbye Fergus"	Earl Bellamy	George Tibbles	October 4, 1971	2245–0768
The Douglas family is preparing for Fergus and Terri's wedding at the house. Reverend MacDougal (John McLiam) comes by and they rehearse the wedding. The rehearsal doesn't go smoothly. Barbara's not sure about the decorations, but Terri loves them. The day of the wedding, Fergus goes out for a walk. Barbara starts to worry when it gets close to wedding time and Fergus isn't back yet. Fergus shows up, but he has a concern. He tells Terri that she shouldn't expect a palace with a lot of servants. He lives in an old house with one old servant. Terri doesn't care. Fergus and Terri tie the knot in a lovely ceremony in the Douglas living room. Terri's friends at the bowling alley chipped in and are sending the couple to Las Vegas for 3 days. Fergus and Terri come back to thank everyone before they head off for Scotland.
361	5	"Four for the Road"	Earl Bellamy	Bob Fisher & Arthur Marx	October 18, 1971	2245–0763
The rest of the family are going to the county fair. The triplets will be staying with Steve, Barbara and Charley. Barbara forgot she volunteered at the hospital and has to leave. Charley has tickets to a ball game leaving the boys with Steve. Chuck Fenady (Robert Brubaker) calls Steve and asks him to come to his office because there is a problem with a project. Having no choice, Steve takes the triplets and Tramp to Chuck's office. Steve leaves the kids with Chucks secretary, Betty Barham. At the end of the day, Chuck and Steve are still working. Betty offers to take the kids home until Steve is finished. The men are finally finished, but the paper that had Betty's address and phone number is accidentally destroyed. Steve is home and tells the family what happened. When Betty finally calls, she says that the boys and Tramp have gone out the front door and cannot not be found. A Cab Driver (Ralph Manza) arrives at the house with the boys and Tramp. The driver found Steve's address on Tramp's collar. Herb Ellis as Security Officer.
362	6	"Polly the Pigeon"	Earl Bellamy	Austin and Irma Kalish	October 25, 1971	2245–0774
Steve and Barbara are going to Chip and Polly's for dinner. Charley makes fun of Polly's cooking. Chip asks Polly to stop buying useless things as their apartment does not have enough room. Polly says she feels sorry for the salesmen, that's why she buys all their stuff. Door-to-door salesman Milton Baxter (David Ketchum) comes to the door just as Steve and Barbara show up. Polly tells Milton she can't talk to him right now. Dinner doesn't go too well. Milton comes by to see Polly again. He talks Polly into hosting a dinner party for eight people to promote his cookware. Polly tells Barbara what she did and she's worried because her place is too small. Barbara offers her house and Charley reluctantly agrees to let Milton use his kitchen. Instead of finding 8 friends, the Douglas family will eat the meal. The next day, Milton talks Steve into hosting another dinner. Polly sees she is not the only one to be taken in by a salesman.
363	7	"Happy Birthday, Anyway"	Earl Bellamy	George Tibbles	November 1, 1971	2245–0770
Charley goes on vacation to San Francisco. Chip and Polly will stay in his room for a visit. Steve's secretary, Janet, reminds him it's Barbara's birthday the next day. As he is swamped at work, Steve asks Janet to buy something. Polly mentions to Barbara that her birthday is a day after Barbara's. Polly tells Chip she doesn't want a present as they need to save money. Ernie tells Chip that he thinks Polly really wants a gift. Steve's gift arrives at home and Barbara loves it. Steve tries to find out what the gift was without letting anyone know he doesn't know what it is. Barbara tells Steve she knows that he doesn't know what the gift was. Robbie sends Katie a gift from Peru. Now Polly is upset that she doesn't have a gift. Katie finds out that her gift was a birthday gift. She gets upset because her birthday is five months away. Barbara gets upset when she learns that Janet picked out the present and not the store. The men try to make things right with their wives by sending them flowers. Charley comes home upset because no one remembered the anniversary of when he joined the family.
364	8	"Proxy Parents"	Earl Bellamy	Doug Tibbles	November 8, 1971	2245–0773
Polly visits Steve at the plant. She asks him if Chip and her should have children. He says she should really discuss it with Chip. They then talk about Steve and Barbara's upcoming camping trip. Later, Chip visits Steve and asks the same question about children. Steve, Barbara and Charley leave for their trip. Katie gets a chance to fly to Peru to spend some time with Robbie. She leaves the triplets and Dodie with Chip and Polly. Meanwhile, at the campsite, Barbara is not adjusting very well. Polly and Chip learn that being parents is more difficult than they thought. Then to top it off, Dodie invites her friends Margaret Spencer (Victoria Paige Meyerink) and Priscilla Hobson (Jodie Foster) to stay over. The weekend is over and everyone is home. Polly tells Steve that despite the problems, she still wants children.
365	9	"The Enthusiast"	Earl Bellamy	George Tibbles	November 15, 1971	2245–0782
Bob Anderson (John Gallaudet) asks Steve to join the executive bowling league despite the fact that Steve has never bowled. Bob tells Steve it doesn't matter as they always lose anyway. Meanwhile, Dodie gets into a fight with her friend Margaret because of something that happened at school and yells at her over the phone. Steve and Barbara go to a dinner party with some of the executives and their wives. Barbara is embarrassingly enthusiastic while playing a word game. Back at home, Barbara apologizes to Steve and says she won't act that way again. The next day, Charley tries to teach Steve how to bowl. At the bowling tournament, Barbara really restrains herself and remains quiet. Steve doesn't bowl well. When the other team's wives cheer for their husbands, Barbara finally does it as well. Steve bowls a little better. The executives still lose, but it's the closet it's been in years. Irene Hervey as Sylvia Anderson. Paul Sorensen as Joe Landacre. John Alvin as Bill Congriff.
366	10	"Katie's Career"	Earl Bellamy	George Tibbles	November 22, 1971	2245–0772
Katie auditions as a singer at a small coffee house called Osserpse. Later, she tells Steve that she misses Rob. Also, she wants to do more than just stay at home with the triplets. Katie tells Steve about the coffee house and she doesn't think she did well. Frankie Leslie (Anthony Caruso), the owner of the coffee house, comes by. Frankie tells Katie to come the next day to audition again. Steve and Charley don't much care for Frankie. Katie gets the job and the audiences like her. Charley and Steve still worry about Frankie and his possible motives. Charley and Steve go to see Katie perform. They meet Frankie's wife Leona and start to realize that they don't have to worry about Katie. It's not long though, before Katie quits, telling Frankie she needs to take care of her kids. Note: The song Katie sings, "The Fountain", was written by Don Grady.
367	11	"Polly's Secret Life"	Earl Bellamy	Doug Tibbles	November 29, 1971	2245–0785
Ernie tells Katie that he's in love with a girl a little older than him and she goes to college with Chip and Polly. Meanwhile, an old friend of Chip's, Nancy Shindelbower, has transferred to his college. Chip introduces Nancy to Polly. Some other girls ask Chip to tutor them. Polly mentions how all the girls Chip knows are pretty. Polly starts to feel that she's not that attractive. Ernie sees Polly going out a lot without Chip and he start to think there is something wrong with their marriage. Even Chip starts to notice that something is going on with Polly and mentions it to Steve. Steve tells Ernie to stop spreading gossip. Polly comes by the Douglas house with a new hairstyle, makeup and outfit. Turns out she's been going to charm school. Everyone is amazed at how good she looks. Chip comes by and loves the way she looks.
368	12	"The Sound of Music"	Earl Bellamy	Robert Pirosh	December 6, 1971	2245–0779
Charley is upset when Dorothy breaks a date with him. Later, Dorothy wants Barbara to ask Charley if he'll be a substitute teacher in a cello music class. Once he hears he'll be paid, Charley accepts. The students are rehearsing for a recital. Dorothy and the students do not approve of his method of teaching. The night before the recital, a Mrs. Cagle (Mitzi Hoag) comes to the Douglas house looking for Charley. She wants Charley to let up on her son Albert. Father O'Hara (Paul Langton) comes by to also complain about Charley's teaching style. Dorothy calls and tells Barbara that the faculty is going to fire Charley. Steve tells Charley and Charley says he just wanted the children to be the best they could be. Charley now sits in his room, dejected. Mrs. Cagle and Charley's three students come to the house. Mrs. Cagle tells Steve that the cello students won a trophy for their recital performance. The students give Charley the trophy.
369	13	"TV Triplets"	Earl Bellamy	George Tibbles	January 13, 1972	2245–0786
Barbara and Katie go shopping at the supermarket with the triplets. Jack Lorning (Bob Hastings), a talent scout, thinks the boys would be perfect for a product he wants to sell. He would like to use them in a commercial. Katie's not sure about it, but she takes the boys to the studio anyway. Jack introduces Katie to Perry Perigrine (Michael Dante), the director. Perry reprimands Katie for being late. The boys meet Blake Willerson (Jon Lormer), who is to be the boys grandfather in the commercial. While trying to film, the boys act out, wander off and break things. Perry grows increasingly irritated. Later, Jack comes by the house. He says that even though they didn't get any footage they could use, the boys looked good on film. Because the boys didn't really get along with Blake, Jack comes up with the idea to have Steve play the part. Even though things don't go smoothly, they do get a commercial they can use. Notes: This was the last episode filmed. My Three Sons returned from Mondays to Thursdays on CBS.
370	14	"Three for School"	Earl Bellamy	Lois Hire	January 20, 1972	2245–0776
Katie has a chance to take a temporary secretarial job. She tells Steve and Barbara that she will put the boys in nursery school. Charley fumes when he hears about the boys. Everyone tells Charley it will be good for the boys. At work, Katie meets assistant office manager, John Wilkes (Anthony Eisley). Katie then befriends fellow secretary, June Mosfitt. Charley leaves for the afternoon, not telling anyone where he's going and comes home in a great mood. Barbara wonders what he's up to. At work, John and mail-boy Richard fawn all over Katie. Something Dodie says, makes Barbara think Charley is seeing a red head every day. It's Katie's last day at work and she gets off early to pick up the boys. She sees Charlie at the school and finds out he's been helping there every day. Shirley O'Hara as Elsa Zettsil. Note: Carolyn Stellar, Dawn Lyn's real-life mother, appears as Katie's co-worker, June Mosfitt.
371	15	"Alfred"	Earl Bellamy	Doug Tibbles	January 27, 1972	2245–0767
Barbara has a chance to substitute teach at a high school. Third grader Dodie mentions to the family that she has first grader Alfred Hoover following her everywhere. Apparently he has quite the crush on her and Dodie is not happy about it. Mrs. Hoover (Barbara Perry) comes to the Douglas house. Dodie said something to Alfred and now he's locked in the bathroom. To try and smooth things over, Charley invites Alfred over for dinner. At dinner, Alfred spends the whole time staring at Dodie. Dodie says she feels sick and goes up to her room. Later that evening, Mrs. Hoover calls to say Alfred has run away. Steve discovers the front door open. When they go up to Dodie's room, they find Alfred sleeping at the base of Dodie's bed. He says he didn't want Dodie to die. Barbara substitute teaches Alfred's class. He now gives Barbara a love letter.
372	16	"Buttons and Beaux"	Earl Bellamy	Joe Connelly	February 3, 1972	2245–0778
A Norman Downs comes by the Douglas house. He tells Charley that he was working with Robbie down in Peru. Norman gives Katie some movies of Robbie. That night they watch the films. But it turns out that Robbie took the films so he's not actually in any of them. Katie is sad. Barbara asks Steve to take Katie out to dinner to try and cheer her up. The next night, Charley takes Katie out and winds up going to the same restaurant. Katie doesn't tell Charley she was there before. The Headwaiter is a little surprised to see Katie with a different man. Ernie takes Katie to the same restaurant the next night. Dodie collects money from the family for something special. Ernie finds out it's to take Katie out for dinner. The next night the whole family takes Katie to the same restaurant.
373	17	"Peanuts"	Earl Bellamy	Dick Conway	February 17, 1972	2245–0771
Dodie and her friends Margaret and Priscilla are going to help raise money for Korean orphans by selling peanuts. Ernie comes home with a large sack of peanuts. Apparently, the peanuts are to be put into smaller bags to sell at a fundraiser. Meanwhile, a classmate named Rita Purcelli has been trying to get a hold of Ernie. Charlie is told the peanuts are raw and need to be roasted. Plus, it has to be done by that night as the fundraiser is the next day. Ernie calls Rita and she says she wants to hang out with him. Rita comes by and meets the family. Barbara and Katie believe that beautiful Rita is just using Ernie to help her with her homework. The family and Katie's friends start bagging the peanuts. The adults wind up working late into the night bagging the peanuts. Ernie realizes that he was being used by Rita. The next morning, Steve finds out the fundraiser was a week ago. Wayne Heffley as Jim Hobson.
374	18	"Bad Day for Steve"	Earl Bellamy	George Tibbles	February 24, 1972	2245–0784
Ernie's school project is to see how the phases of the moon affect people. He has the whole family on a chart to keep track of them for 48 hours during a full moon. Ernie wants to see if any of them come into some bad luck. Charley thinks the whole thing is stupid. The next morning, Charley drops a bottle of milk. At work, some little accidents start happening to Steve. Bob Anderson asks Steve to speak at a contractors dinner the next evening. Steve is having a hard time writing a speech. Even at home, accidents keep happening to Steve. The next morning, Steve gets laryngitis and won't be able to give the speech. Bad things continue to happen to Steve. Ernie informs Steve and Barbara he made a mistake. There wasn't a full moon for the last two days, but it will start tonight.
375	19	"Second Banana"	Earl Bellamy	Lois Hire	March 2, 1972	2245–0775
Steve is pre-occupied with a time-consuming project at work and doesn't have time for Barbara or the family. Charley tells Barbara about a Bar-B-Que cooking contest that he's entering. Katie tells Barbara that she entered Barbara's recipe for "Tangy Tidbits" to the contest. Barbara gets a letter from the contest saying she's one of the finalists. She wins a trip to Hawaii for the final cook-off. Charley got a letter as well, but he only won a years supply of charcoal. Barbara asks Steve to go with, but he can't. Barbara arrives in Hawaii. Back at home, Steve is finally finished with his project. Charley tells him to go meet up with Barbara. Barbara is thrilled to see Steve, but now she's the one too busy to spend time with him. Barbara wins third place. Linda Haynes as Cindy. Clarence Lung as Hotel Clerk. C. Lindsay Workman as Dan McCullough. Rand Brooks as Ed Henson.
376	20	"Bad Day for Barbara"	Earl Bellamy	Lois Hire	March 16, 1972	2245–0769
Barbara wakes up not feeling well and Steve tells her to stay in bed. But Katie had to go somewhere and Charley's leg is bothering him. Barbara is now saddled with the responsibility of looking after things in the house. The triplets come in the house all covered in mud which Barbara must now clean up. When she tries to lay down for a while, Charley practices his cello and Ernie gets in the way with a project of his. Barbara then learns that she'll have to go to the market as Charley can't. Polly comes by with a problem that Barbara straightens out. Then Barbara has to take Tramp to the vet because the dog got into a fight with a cat. Steve comes home and complains about the rough day he had at work. When Steve says how easy Barbara must have had it laying in bed all day, she leaves the house. Steve tries to figure out what caused her to leave, but everyone says nothing happened all day. It's getting late and Steve starts to worry. Barbara finally comes home and says she just had a bad day.
377	21	"The Birth of Arfie"	Earl Bellamy	Doug Tibbles	March 23, 1972	2245–0781
After he lets Tramp out on the back porch for the evening, Charley wonders how the dog winds up in Dodie's room. This has happened several times. Dodie confesses to letting him in. It's because she's afraid of the shadows in her room and knows Tramp will protect her. That night, Tramp finds his way out of the porch and goes outside. Steve tells Dodie not to worry because Tramp always comes back. It's been several days and Tramp hasn't come back. When Dodie grows increasingly worried, Barbara takes her to Dr. Fredericks (Booth Colman), a child psychologist. Dr. Fredericks gives Barbara some advice about Dodie and says there is nothing seriously wrong with her. On the way home from school, Dodie sees a little dog and has it follow her home. Dodie is happy she has another dog until the real owners come and claim it. Charley makes her a doggy rag-doll and names it Arfie. But, he has second thoughts about giving it to her and has Ernie throw it in the garbage. Katie finds it and brings it in the house. Charley sees Dodie sleeping with Arfie and she tells Charley she really likes the doll. Tramp comes home. Peter Robbins as Jeffrey Fredericks.
378	22	"Lonesome Katie"	Earl Bellamy	George Tibbles	March 30, 1972	2245–0777
Dodie wants to have a slumber party with her friends Margaret and Priscilla, but Charley is against it. Jewel Marsenick (Elaine Giftos) comes by the house and says her husband Carl is a friend of Robbie's. They are working together in Peru. But Jewel hasn't heard anything in 5 weeks. Jewel and Katie make plans to have dinner and talk. Dodie asks Barbara about the slumber party, but she says no. At dinner, Jewel mentions how she hasn't seen Carl in 2 years and he hasn't even met his young son. Jewel complains that Carl loves it in Peru. Every time she asks him to come home, he comes up with a reason not to. Jewel says that she's leaving Carl and asks if Katie could have Robbie tell him. Dodie has Steve read a composition she claims she wrote for school about a slumber party. Katie becomes disillusioned about life without Robbie and talks to Steve. Dodie gets to have her slumber party. But when Margaret and Priscilla come over, neither one knows what a slumber party entails. Katie decides her marriage is worth keeping. Yale Summers as Bill Miller.
379	23	"Barbara Lost"	Earl Bellamy	Doug Tibbles	April 6, 1972	2245–0783
Polly comes by hoping to talk to Steve, as she's having a problem with Chip. But Steve is away on business. Polly says that Chip's boyhood friend Brian Lipsker (Micky Dolenz of The Monkees) is visiting. Brian is now a big rock star going by the name John Simpson. Chip is thinking of giving up his studies and becoming a rock star, too. Charley invites John over for dinner. John talks about all the places he's been. He also mentions that he's married and expecting his second child. He brings the family with him when he tours. Chip believes that kind of life is for him. John mentions that he makes $2 million a year. Polly really wants Chip to pursue his chemical engineering degree. Even Steve thinks a music career might not be bad. Polly decides to back Chip's decision. But, after a talk with Steve, Chip decides to continue his studies. Johnny Silver as Plumber. Note: These are the final appearances of Chip, Polly and Dodie.
380	24	"Whatever Happened To Ernie?"	Earl Bellamy	George Tibbles	April 13, 1972	2245–0780
Steve's boss, Bob Anderson, asks him if Ernie is being rebellious at age 17. Steve says not really. Bob and his wife Sylvia come over to Steve's house to talk about their son Gordon. They wonder what Steve did right to have Ernie turn out so well. The next day Steve calls Barbara and tells her that the Anderson's would like to have them over that evening. Bob would like Ernie to come along. Ernie has a date but he does give Steve some advice about Gordon. Ernie says that Bob should talk to Gordon rather than order him to do things. Bob introduces Gordon to Steve and Barbara. Gordon clearly isn't happy to be there and Bob is very strict with him. Bob suspects that Gordon has fallen into drug use. Ernie comes back from his date and decides to go over to the Anderson's. Ernie realizes who Gordon is and tells the Anderson's that they have nothing to worry about as far as Gordon is concerned.

== TV special ==
No.	Title	Directed by	Written by	Original release date
1	"Thanksgiving Reunion with The Partridge Family and My Three Sons"	Perry Rosemond	Bo Kaprall	November 25, 1977
A one-hour celebration featuring the casts of The Partridge Family and My Three Sons discussing their current lives and memorable moments from their past shows.
