= Men into Space =

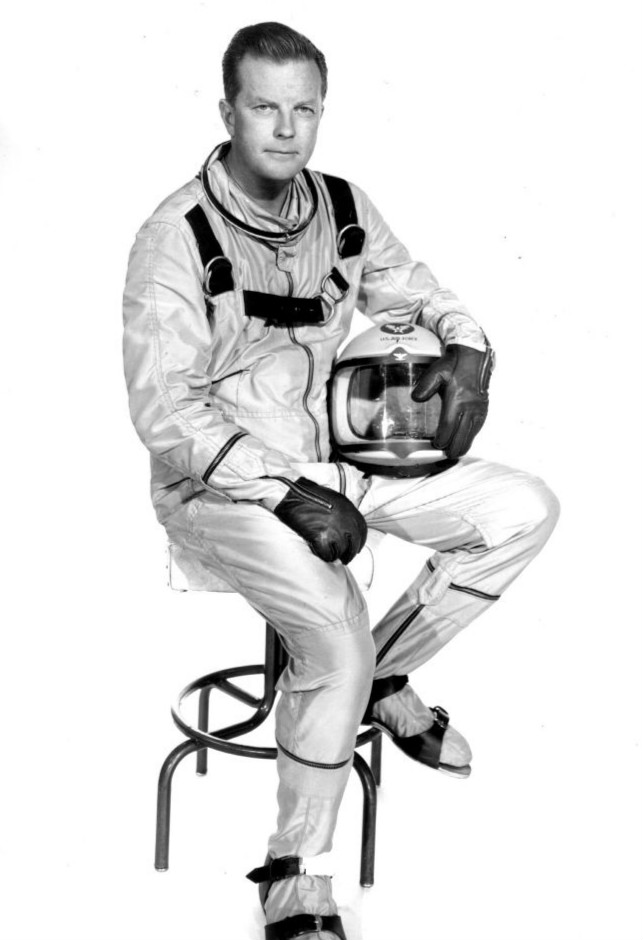
- William Lundigan as Edward McCauley.
- Also known as: Space Challenge
- Genre: Science fiction
- Created by: Lewis J. Rachmil
- Written by: Jerome Bixby; Stuart J. Byrne; James Clavell; Meyer Dolinsky; David Duncan; Sidney Kalcheim; Robert Warnes Leach; Ib Melchior; Marianne Mosner; Michael Plant; Francis Rosenwald; William Templeton; Arthur Weiss
- Directed by: William Conrad; Alan Crosland, Jr. Walter Doniger; Alvin Ganzer; Jack Herzberg; Herman Hoffman; Nathan H. Juran; Otto Lang; Lee Sholem; Herbert L. Strock
- Starring: William Lundigan; Tyler McVey
- Theme music composer: David Rose
- Country of origin: United States
- Original language: English
- No. of seasons: 1
- No. of episodes: 38

Production
- Executive producer: Maurice Ziv
- Producers: Sol Dolgin; Lewis J. Rachmil
- Cinematography: Edward Cronjager; William P. Whitley
- Running time: 30 minutes
- Production company: Ziv Television Programs

Original release
- Network: CBS
- Release: September 30, 1959 – September 7, 1960

Men into Space (a.k.a. Space Challenge in later American syndication) is an American black-and-white science fiction television series, produced by Ziv Television Programs, Inc., that was first broadcast by CBS from September 30, 1959, to September 7, 1960. The series depicts future efforts by the United States Air Force to explore and develop outer space. The series' star, William Lundigan, played Col. Edward McCauley.

== Scenarios ==
Men into Space was not set in a specified time period, but clues dropped in the scripts indicated that it took place between the mid-1970s and mid-1980s. The first Moon landing would have occurred circa 1975. Some props were futuristic (such as a forerunner of today's real-life LCD TVs), but the show's Earth clothing and environs, including automobiles, telephones, and other machines, were decidedly late 1950s. The program aired in the year just prior to the beginning of human spaceflight, with Vostok 1 and the Project Mercury launching crewed spacecraft in 1961.

Men into Space was somewhat unusual for a TV action series in that it had numerous recurring characters, but only one protagonist, Col. Edward McCauley (William Lundigan), who was in all 38 of the series' episodes. Tyler McVey appeared in seven episodes as Major General Norgath. Ron Foster appeared five times as Lieutenant Neil Templeton. Joyce Taylor had a recurring role in eight episodes as Col. McCauley's wife, Mary McCauley.

McCauley was a sort of "everyman" character who was viewed in the show as the most experienced and illustrious astronaut. As depicted in the scripts, the low-key but decisive McCauley was ubiquitous, assigned to every important space mission over at least a decade, including the earliest human flights, the first flight to the Moon, many additional lunar landings and Moon base construction missions, construction of a space station, and two flights to Mars (neither succeeded, and folklore has it that plans for a never-aired second season would have focused on further missions to Mars and beyond).

In many episodes, the astronauts were faced with accidents or technical problems that required innovation. The program was not idealistic; missions sometimes failed and astronauts sometimes died. For example, a scientist-astronaut stricken with a coronary thrombosis while exploring the Moon was not expected to survive the G-forces of the return flight, so his comrades stowed the space-suited patient in a steel drum filled with water, to cushion him during launch. A "Space Race" episode involved spacecraft from the United States and the Soviet Union starting out almost simultaneously on the first Mars mission, with the American spacecraft aborting its effort in order to rescue the Soviet crew after their spacecraft experienced problems.

The series included an episode whose plot essentially paralleled the ill-fated Apollo 13 mission's explosion in space more than a decade later and another that was an uncanny foretelling of the accident that befell the real Gemini 8 mission in 1966.

Scripts often considered the human factor, and while action was the show's forte, humor and romance were part of the mix. Men into Space predicted women astronauts and scientists, as well as married couples in space.

== Production ==
The program was produced by Ziv Television Programs, Inc., whose other notable series included Sea Hunt. The theme and recurring background music were written and conducted by David Rose. The series was produced by Lewis J. Rachmil. Special effects were created by Thol Simonson, Louis Dewitt, Irving Block, and Jack Rabin, including miniature models of spacecraft.

Among the guest stars was Keith Larsen of the CBS series Brave Eagle and The Aquanauts. Joyce Taylor played the role of Mary McCauley in the series, but Angie Dickinson played the role in the original pilot episode. Other guest stars include James Best, Whit Bissell, Paul Burke, James Coburn, Paul Comi, James Drury, Joe Flynn, Arthur Franz, Nancy Gates, Allison Hayes, Murray Hamilton, Brett King, Werner Klemperer, Gavin MacLeod, Joe Maross, Donald May, Bek Nelson, Simon Oakland, Denver Pyle, Robert Reed, William Schallert, Warren Stevens, Marshall Thompson, Harry Townes, and Robert Vaughn.

The pilot episode used real, high-altitude pressure suits developed by the United States Navy, but most of the space suits used in the series were US Air Force designs.

In the UK, Men into Space was shown on the BBC as a children's series. It was programmed in an early Saturday evening slot that was later filled by Doctor Who.

== Prediction of later technologies ==
Men into Space used for its plots many technical and human problems anticipated by engineers and planners. For example, the show depicted attempts to refuel spacecraft by tanker in orbit, construction of a space telescope, an experiment to dispose of high level atomic waste by launching it into the Sun, the search for life-sustaining frozen Lunar water, and exploration and destruction of an asteroid whose orbit threatened Earth. In two different episodes, the series even speculated about exo-fossil extraterrestrial life discovered while exploring a distant asteroid and about ancient Earth-orbiting spaceship debris belonging to a non-human, space-faring civilization. Although the series was modestly budgeted, it was cleverly mounted with what, for its era, were very good special effects helmed by Louis DeWitt. Even decades later, the series can still be watched and appreciated for its attention to detail and accurate physics.

== Scientific accuracy ==
A narrator explained in nearly every episode why the astronauts needed magnetic boots to walk in or upon their free-falling spacecraft, how a jet thruster backpack could propel an astronaut through the vacuum of space, why a wrong angle of attack could doom a spacecraft upon atmospheric re-entry, and so forth. The spacecraft in the program were shown gliding to a powerless landing on a dry lake bed, just like the real Space Shuttle nearly 25 years later. Footage of these landings used documentary film of the SM-64 Navaho cruise missile landing at Edwards AFB.

On the other hand, dramatic license held sway on soundtracks, which repeatedly depicted sound in the airless vacuum of space: airlocks hummed, rockets roared, explosions boomed, and footsteps on the Moon's surface could be heard. Spacesuits being worn by the actors did not expand when exposed to the vacuum of space, as they would later during actual space walks.

== Design and visuals ==
Men into Space was advertised as being (for its era) an extremely accurate preview of human spaceflight, based on scientific studies and buttressed by technical assistance from the USAF's ballistic missile and space medicine offices. The spacecraft designs, however, veered inconsistently between early 1950s Wernher von Braun concept vehicles, and later on, totally scaled-down and more practical spacecraft proposals. Visual backdrops and conceptual designs of spacecraft, space stations, and a Moon base depended somewhat on contributions from notable astronomical and science fiction artist Chesley Bonestell.

The series also utilized extensive documentary footage of early missile launches, notably the Atlas missile. It evoked the earlier Disney space exploration documentaries, which in turn owed their look and feel to a widely read, early 1950s series on the subject in the old Collier's Weekly magazine, where Bonestell's art also held sway. At one point in production, a scale model and poster of an Atlas-derived missile design was built with the series spacecraft as its payload, with publicity photos of Lundigen holding the model in front of the large poster. Several scenes used documentary footage from the canceled Navaho missile program to depict spacecraft landings on the desert runway. The distinctive design of the North American X-10 (different from the close up depictions of the series spacecraft) can be seen in the desert landing sequences.

== Episode list ==
No.	Title	Original release date
1	"Moon Probe"	September 30, 1959
2	"Moon Landing"	October 7, 1959
3	"Building a Space Station"	October 21, 1959
4	"Water Tank Rescue"	October 28, 1959
5	"Lost Missile"	November 4, 1959
6	"Moonquake"	November 11, 1959
7	"Space Trap"	November 18, 1959
8	"Asteroid"	November 25, 1959
9	"Edge of Eternity"	December 2, 1959
10	"Burnout"	December 9, 1959
11	"First Woman on the Moon"	December 16, 1959
12	"Christmas on the Moon"	December 23, 1959
13	"Quarantine"	December 30, 1959
14	"Tankers in Space"	January 6, 1960
15	"Sea of Stars"	January 13, 1960
16	"A Handful of Hours"	January 20, 1960
17	"Earthbound"	January 27, 1960
18	"Caves of the Moon"	February 3, 1960
19	"Dateline: Moon"	February 10, 1960
20	"Moon Cloud"	February 17, 1960
21	"Contraband"	March 2, 1960
22	"Dark of the Sun"	March 9, 1960
23	"Verdict in Orbit"	March 16, 1960
24	"Is There Another Civilization?"	March 23, 1960
25	"Shadows on the Moon"	March 30, 1960
26	"Flash in the Sky"	April 6, 1960
27	"Lunar Secret"	April 13, 1960
28	"Voice of Infinity"	April 20, 1960
29	"From Another World"	April 27, 1960
30	"Emergency Mission"	May 4, 1960
31	"Beyond the Stars"	May 11, 1960
32	"Mission to Mars"	May 25, 1960
33	"Moon Trap"	June 1, 1960
34	""Flare Up"	August 17, 1960
35	"Into the Sun"	August 24, 1960
36	"The Sun Never Sets"	August 31, 1960
37	"Mystery Satellite"	September 7, 1960
38	"Flight to the Red Planet"	September 14, 1960

== Novelization ==
A paperback novelization of the TV series, written by science fiction writer Murray Leinster, was published in 1960.

== In popular culture ==
Spacesuit costumes and special-effects footage of space vehicles (shot with miniature models) from the series were later re-used in The Outer Limits, the science fiction film The Phantom Planet, and the 1969 drama Midnight Cowboy (the space picture playing on the movie screen during Joe Buck's tryst with a young man is footage from Men into Space episode 1).

In the early 1960s, Ideal Toy Company manufactured and sold a toy space helmet styled after the one worn by the main character, Col. Edward McCauley. Dell Comics as part of their TV Adventure series published a Men into Space comic book in March 1960, with three stories based on television episodes, illustrated by artist Murphy Anderson. Also in 1960, the Milton Bradley Company produced a Men into Space board game, inspired by the television program and designed for ages 9 to 14, Aladdin Industries offered a "Colonel Ed McCauley Space Explorer" metal lunchbox and thermos, and Multiple Products Corporation put out a "Colonel McCauley Space Unit" plastic toy set with miniature astronaut action figures and a rocket.
