= The Man and the Challenge =

- Promotional poster
- Genre: Adventure fiction
- Starring: George Nader
- Country of origin: United States
- Original language: English
- No. of seasons: 1
- No. of episodes: 36

Production
- Producer: Ivan Tors
- Running time: ca. 25–26 mins.
- Production company: Ivan Tors-Ziv Television Programs

Original release
- Network: NBC
- Release: September 12, 1959 – June 11, 1960

The Man and the Challenge is an American adventure fiction television series about a scientist who tests problems of human survival. It stars George Nader and aired on NBC during the 1959–60 television season.

== Synopsis ==
Dr. Glenn Barton is an athlete, explorer, adventurer, and former United States Marine who has become a physician and a research scientist for the Institute of Human Factors, a U.S. government agency that designs and conducts experiments to study human endurance and its limits. His wide-ranging curiosity and interests suit him well for his assignments, which involve him testing equipment and personnel under conditions of extreme stress in a variety of research areas. He frequently subjects himself to the tests before allowing others to participate. Emergencies often arise which force Barton or his test subjects to go past the limits of previous tests in an attempt to save the situation. Lynn Allen is his assistant.

== Cast ==
- George Nader as Dr. Glenn Barton
- Joyce Meadows as Lynn Allen

== Production ==
The Man and the Challenge was an Ivan Tors-Ziv Television Programs production, and Ivan Tors produced the series. Episodes were filmed at Ziv Studios in Hollywood. Each episode tells its story in a semi-documentary format. Alternate sponsors were Winston cigarettes and the Chemstrand Corporation.

Episodes were filmed on location rather than in a studio. Experts from government agencies coached the actors about activities with regard to specific subjects.

== Broadcast history ==
The Man and the Challenge premiered on September 12, 1959, and 36 episodes were produced. It aired on NBC on Saturdays at 8:30 p.m. Eastern Time against ABC's Leave it to Beaver and CBS's Wanted: Dead or Alive. The show was cancelled after a single season, and its last new episode was broadcast on June 11, 1960. Prime-time reruns of The Man and the Challenge then aired in its regular time slot until September 3, 1960.

== Episodes ==
No.	Title	Directed by	Written by	Original release date
1	"The Sphere of No Return"	Andrew Marton	Lee Erwin	September 12, 1959
Barton joins two other man in testing human stamina in a balloon at very high altitudes. After one of the men panics and fails the required standards, a woman replaces him — and the other man reacts negatively to her assignment to the balloon crew. Guest stars: Paul Burke, Raymond Bailey, Keith Vincent, and Frank Kirby.
2	"Maximum Capacity"	Unknown	Unknown	September 19, 1959
To determine the best way to train people for high-security jobs in the Arctic, Barton sends two men into the Arctic to test their endurance in extreme levels of cold and isolation. Guest stars: James Best, Mike Masters, Robert Conrad, Paula Raymond, and Robert Karnes.
3	"Odds Against Survival"	Unknown	Unknown	September 26, 1959
Barton investigates the human capacity for living for an extended period in a small enclosed space, starting with an underwater habitat. Guest stars: Robert Clarke, Bethel Leslie, and Whit Bissell.
4	"Sky Diving"	Unknown	Unknown	October 3, 1959
The U.S. Government is interested in the effects of gravity on potential astronauts, so Barton goes to France to study it by learning free-fall parachuting from Suzanne and Georges Bolet, a brother-and-sister skydiving team. Guest stars: Danielle Aubrey, John Van Dreelen, and Alberto Morin.
5	"Experiments in Terror"	Unknown	Unknown	October 10, 1959
David Mumford is a brilliant, well-known scientist who holds a grudge against Barton, so he and his secretary plot to kill the unsuspecting Barton and make it look like his death was an accident. Guest stars: Otto Kruger, Julia Adams, and Logan Field.
6	"Invisible Force"	Unknown	Paul King	October 17, 1959
An official from Washington, D.C., asks Barton to form a clandestine athletic unit to free three Americans being held captive in a hostile country. Guest stars: Debra Paget, William Conrad, Carol Thurston, and Patrick Waltz.
7	"Escape from Nepal"	Unknown	Unknown	October 24, 1959
A new drug called U2-21 is intended to increase a human's ability to retain oxygen at high altitudes, and to see how well it works, Barton puts a group of mountaineers through a rigorous test in the Rocky Mountains before sending them to the Himalayas for a final test. Guest stars: Myron Healy, John Maxwell, and Joan Granville.
8	"Border to Border"	Unknown	Unknown	October 31, 1959
To prove that a team can overcome obstacles which one man cannot handle alone, Barton enters two jet pilots who are antagonistic toward each another in a Mexican auto race in which they face a grueling challenge from a professional driver. Guest stars: Edward Kemmer and Don Kennedy.
9	"Trial By Fire"	Unknown	Unknown	November 7, 1959
Barton and two newly-married geologists go to an active volcano to test a new type of fire suit — and almost lose their lives. Guest stars: H. M. Wynant and Joyce Taylor.
10	"White Out"	Unknown	Unknown	November 14, 1959
Hoping to develop a way to freeze astronauts to help them withstand interplanetary travel, Barton travels to Antarctica and researches hypothermia by reducing the body temperature of two doctors. Guest stars: Jan Shepard, Philip Terry, and Don Eitner.
11	"The Breaking Point"	Unknown	Unknown	November 28, 1959
Barton conducts a test in which a volunteer is subjected to psychological torment while sealed in a cell for 30 days in order to find his breaking point. Guest stars: Alfred Ryder, John Marley, and Tony Monaco.
12	"Jungle Survival"	Unknown	Unknown	December 5, 1959
Barton travels to the Amazon Basin to test jungle survival techniques while searching for four missing aviators. Guest stars: Dean Harens, Mike Masters, and Marcia Henderson.
13	"I've Killed Seven Men"	Unknown	Unknown	December 12, 1959
Barton selects a ski patrol sergeant as the subject of an experiment to see how long a human can last without sleep. Guest stars: Lin McCarthy and Jean Allison.
14	"Man Without Fear"	.	Unknown	December 19, 1959
Barton administers a dose of an experimental mixture of chemicals intended to reduce fear in humans called LSD to a firefighter at the scene of a raging forest fire to see if it will make him more courageous. The man exhibits greater bravery, but the experiment demonstrates that fear is a necessary part of courage. Guest stars: John Day, Tracey Roberts, Frank Gerstle, and Nick Nicholson.
15	"The Visitors"	Unknown	Unknown	December 26, 1959
Barton and two of his associates use restricted U.S. Government property to test the best type of clothing for use on other planets. Guest stars: Bert Remsen, Fuzzy Knight, Robert J. Wilke, Len Lesser, and Jack Ging.
16	"The Storm"	Unknown	Unknown	January 2, 1960
Barton is asked to clear the reputation of a marine scientist who died under mysterious circumstances. Guest stars: Fred Gabourie, Roberta Haynes, Lee Johnson, and Byron Morrow.
17	"Killer River"	Unknown	Unknown	January 9, 1960
Barton rescues a pilot who became caught on a cliff above the Colorado River after parachuting from his plane. Guest stars: John Archer and Michael Keith.
18	"Rodeo"	Unknown	Unknown	January 23, 1960
A female rodeo rider helps Barton investigate the effects of a new rocket belt. Guest stars: Ann Robinson, Myron Healy, Neil Grant, Larry Mann, and Chuck Parkerson.
19	"The Windowless Room"	Unknown	Unknown	January 30, 1960
After an accomplished test pilot crashes his aircraft, he suffers from a self-induced paralysis that slowly destroys his career and marriage. Barton comes to his aid, using hypnosis to restore his confidence. Guest stars: Jack Ging, Sue Randall, Raymond Bailey, Doris Fesete, and Michael Keith.
20	"Nightmare Crossing"	Unknown	Unknown	February 6, 1960
Barton uses a difficult crossing in a small boat to test candidates for command positions aboard spacecraft. Guest stars: Keith Larsen, Tony Monaco, Mike Keene, Pat McCaffrie, and Jack Catron.
21	"The Lure of Danger"	Unknown	Unknown	February 13, 1960
To test his theory that individuals who crave danger may subconsciously want to destroy themselves, Barton goes to the bullfights in Mexico. Guest stars: Miguel Landa, Felipe Turich, Abel Franco, Robert Mercy, and Edward Colmans.
22	"Recovery"	Unknown	Unknown	February 20, 1960
After one of Barton's experiments ends in tragedy, a newspaper columnist criticizes his handling of it. Guest stars: Eloise Hardt, John Archer, and Jack Catron.
23	"Buried Alive"	Unknown	Unknown	February 27, 1960
Barton experiments with yoga to see if it is helpful in averting tragedy. Guest stars: Robert Gothie, Robert Bice, Don Eitner, and Don Harvey.
24	"Recondo"	Unknown	Unknown	March 5, 1960
After four escaping convicts kidnap a warden's daughter and take her with them as a hostage, Barton devises a way to free her unharmed. Guest stars: Jack Harris, Marianna Hill, Arvid Nelson, Jay Douglas, and Bern Bassey.
25	"Flying Lab"	Unknown	Unknown	March 12, 1960
Barton flies an airplane into a hurricane without informing part of the crew as an experiment to see how fear induced by ignorance of causes can affect human performance. Guest stars: Keith Vincent, Jack Hamilton, Robert Knapp, and Page Slattery.
26	"Hurricane Mesa"	Unknown	Unknown	March 19, 1960
Barton conducts a test on a pilot to prove to him that he can still have an important function when he is switched from flying to a desk job. Guest stars: Jack Ging and Robert Bice.
27	"Astro Female"	Unknown	Unknown	March 26, 1960
Barton pits four women against four men to prove that women can perform as well as — and perhaps better than — men as astronauts. Guest stars: Maureen Leeds, Adrienne Hayes, Joan Granville, and Ethel Jensen.
28	"The Extra Sense"	Unknown	Unknown	April 2, 1960
Barton parachutes from a high precipice to demonstrate that emotional stress promotes telepathy. Guest stars: Frank Maxwell and Paul Comi.
29	"Man in the Capsule"	Unknown	Unknown	April 9, 1960
Barton conducts a test of a survival capsule by locking two men in it while it floats on the surface of the ocean for three days. Guest stars: Darryl Hickman, Fred Beir, Dick Jeffries, and Donald Gamble.
30	"The Dropper"	Unknown	Unknown	April 23, 1960
A psychopathic killer has rigged the trunk of his car to eject logs onto the highway to kill or injure pursuing motorcycle policemen, so Barton develops a new drug that speeds up human perception so that the motorcycle policemen can maneuver out of the way of the deadly debris and apprehend the killer. Guest stars: Jack O'Brien, Arthur Heller, Jerry Summers, Tyler McVey, Howard McLeod, and Mike Masters.
31	"High Dive"	Unknown	Unknown	April 30, 1960
An attractive female Olympic high diver helps Barton test a theory about the cause of a loss of equilibrioception. Guest stars: Olive Sturgess, Charles Alvin Bell, Michael Keith, Vernon Rich, and Charles R. Keene.
32	"Daredevils"	Unknown	Unknown	May 7, 1960
In the belief that the secret to survival lies in chemical reactions in the human body, Barton puts the top suit driver through an extremely dangerous test. Guest stars: Don Kennedy, Christine White, Ted Knight, and Doris Fosette.
33	"Shooter McLaine"	Unknown	Unknown	May 21, 1960
Ignoring his own physical limits and Barton's warnings, a scientist misreads important test instruments, almost killing Barton. Guest stars: John Milford, Mala Powers, Dick Rich, and Charles Tannen.
34	"Early Warning"	Unknown	Unknown	May 28, 1960
Barton fears that a single-minded scientist could be working himself to death. Guest stars: Philip Ober, Bethel Leslie, Andy Thompson, and Marshall Kent.
35	"Breakoff"	Unknown	Unknown	June 4, 1960
Barton tries to help a pilot who experiences excessive anxiety at high altitudes. Guest stars: Karl Swenson and Miranda Jones.
36	"Highway to Danger"	Unknown	Unknown	June 11, 1960
Barton researches the phenomenon of highway hypnosis by subjecting himself to driving conditions that have killed five truck drivers. Guest stars: Karen Scott, Hank Patterson, and Barney Biro.

== Critical response ==
Critic Jack Gould summarized an episode of The Man and the Challenge as "Quickie hokum" in a two-paragraph review in The New York Times. He also commented that the episode "began at 8:30 and for some reason persisted until 9."
