= William Crowell =

William Crowell may refer to:

- William P. Crowell (born 1940), Deputy Director of the National Security Agency, 1994–1997
- William C. Crowell (1871–1951), American architect and builder
