= Playset =

Collection of similar toys designed to work together

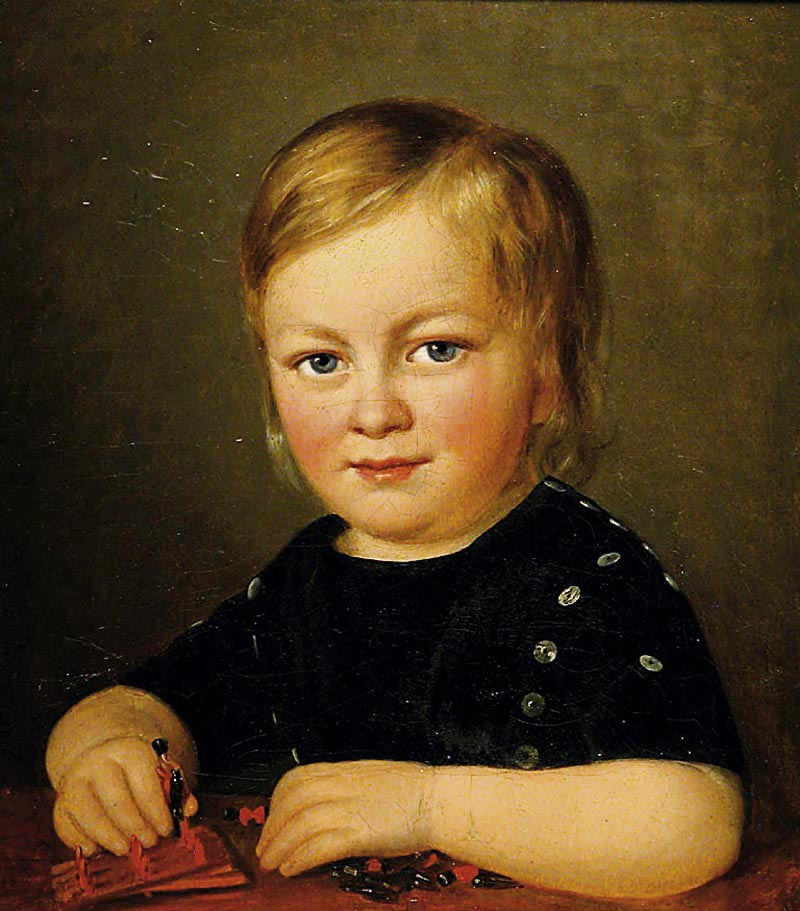
Child playing with toy (tin) figures

Playsets, or play sets, are themed collections of similar toys designed to work together to enact some action or event. The most common toy playsets involve plastic figures, accessories, and possibly buildings or scenery, purchased together in a common box. Some sets during the 1960s and 1970s were offered within metal "suitcase" containers that also functioned as part of the playset.

First pioneered by metal figure manufacturers around the turn of the 20th century, usually as military "play" figures with simple accessories, the concept of the playset was further developed by companies like Marx Toys, Superior Toy, Remco, Deluxe Reading, Multiple Toymakers (MPC) and others throughout the Baby Boomer era. Several manufacturers continue to produce playsets today.

== Popular playsets ==
Several popular playsets by Marx were:

- Battle of the Blue and Gray (1958)
- Battleground
- Ben-Hur
- Desert Fox
- Fort Apache (1951)
- The Alamo
- The Guns of Navarone
- Johnny Tremain

Popular playsets based on television series were:

- The Adventures of Rin Tin Tin
- The Adventures of Robin Hood (TV series)
- Captain Gallant of the Foreign Legion
- Daniel Boone
- Davy Crockett
- The Flintstones
- The Gallant Men
- Tom Corbett
- Gunsmoke
- Jungle Jim later recycled as Daktari
- Johnny Ringo
- The Rifleman
- The Roy Rogers Show Mineral City (1952) (the first "branded" playset)
- The Untouchables
- Zorro

== See also ==
- Toy soldiers
