= Marshall Kent =

Marshall Kent may refer to:

- Marshall Kent (actor) (1908−1985), actor
- Marshall Kent (bowler) (born 1992), American ten-pin bowler
