= Una Nixson Hopkins =

American art director

- Born: November 17, 1869; Denison, Iowa
- Died: September 8, 1956 (aged 86); Los Angeles, California
- Other name: Una Nixon Hopkins
- Occupations: Art director in silent films, writer, designer
- Children: George James Hopkins

Una Nixson Hopkins (November 17, 1869 – September 8, 1956) was an American writer and designer, and an art director who worked in silent films.

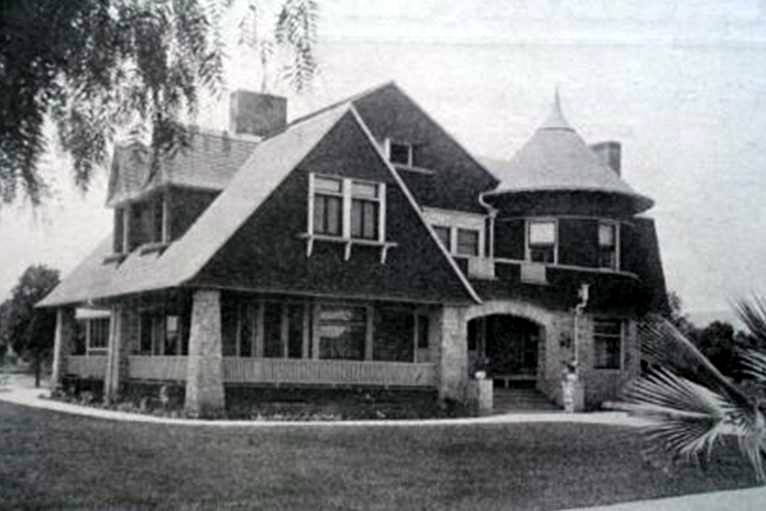
UN Hopkins Residence in Pasadena, 1899; built by Joseph Blick

== Early life ==
Una B. Nixson was born in Denison, Iowa, the daughter of William H. Nixson (or Nixon) and Mariam Hoxsie Nixson (later Amsden).

== Career ==
Hopkins was widowed in her twenties, and lived in a Pasadena bungalow built by Joseph Blick in 1899. She wrote, and did interior design, and worked as an art director in Hollywood, sometimes described as "the first woman art director in motion pictures". "No trouble is too great for her to take," a 1908 profile explained of her interior decorating work, "and she often spends weeks hunting the shops for some shade or texture to give the needed bit of sheen or color to a room."

In 1915 Hopkins was hired as art director for the Oliver Morosco Photoplay Company. Hopkins had credits on twelve silent films: The Spirit of Romance (1917), More Deadly than the Male (1919), Judy of Rogue's Harbor (1920), Nurse Marjorie (1920), Jenny Be Good (1920), Food for Scandal (1920), A Full House (1920), Burglar Proof (1920), Oh, Lady, Lady (1920), Her First Elopement (1920), Ducks and Drakes (1921), and The Wise Virgin (1924). Several of the films she worked on are now considered lost; two were directed by William Desmond Taylor. After her film career ended, she continued supporting her son, George James Hopkins, in his film work.

== Selected publications ==
The Los Angeles Herald described Hopkins in 1910 as "one of the successful women writers of the West," adding that she was helping to promote Southern California to Eastern audiences. She published a novel, A Winter Romance in Poppy Land (1911). She also contributed short stories and articles on interior design to magazines, especially Ladies' Home Journal, House Beautiful, The Craftsman, and Country Life in America. "Hopkins seemed especially interested in the problems that single working women faced in obtaining suitable housing," noted architectural historian Leland M. Roth. She was a member of the Southern California Press Club.

=== Fiction ===
- "Johnny's Cookies" (1904, short story, The Los Angeles Times)
- "The Banks Woman" (1906, short story, The Pacific Monthly)
- A Winter Romance in Poppy Land (1911, novel)
- "The Bride Who Wouldn't Have a Servant" (1910, short story, Ladies' Home Journal)

=== Non-fiction ===
- "John Brown's Family — The Man of Harper's Ferry Fame — His Sons and Daughter. Visit to Their Homes in Pasadena. California. One Who Has Suffered Intensely and Lived Above the Petty Annoyances of Life" (1893, The Inter Ocean newspaper)
- "A House Facing West" (1904, House Beautiful)
- "Small Houses and their Decoration" (1904, House Beautiful)
- "The California Bungalow" (1906, The Pacific Monthly)
- "Possibilities in a Southern Clime" and "In Regard to Cottages" (1906, The Book of a Hundred Houses)
- "A House of Fine Detail" (1907, The Craftsman)
- "Plaster Homes in the Southwest" (1908, The Craftsman)
- "A Home Built About its Trees" (1909, Country Life in America)
- "The Small House for Less than $1000" (1909, Ladies' Home Journal)
- "A House Built for Children" (1909, Ladies' Home Journal)
- "A Family Clubhouse" (1910, Good Housekeeping)
- "For the Bride Who Does Her Own Work" (1910, Ladies' Home Journal)
- "A Bedroom With a Sleeping Porch" (1911, Ladies' Home Journal)
- "A Semi-Detached Bungalow Development in California" (1912, Country Life in America)
- "A Picturesque Court of 30 Bungalows" (1913, Ladies' Home Journal)
- "What Three Women Did With Their House" (1913, Ladies' Home Journal)
- "The Young Folks' First Bungalow" (1913, Ladies' Home Journal)'
- "A Home and Bookbindery in One" (1913, Country Life in America)
- "How You Can Live Outdoors" and "New Ideas in Children's Playhouses" (1913, Ladies' Home Journal)
- "Some Phases of Domestic Architecture in the Southwest" (1914, The International Studio)
- "The Joys of Girls' Camps" (1915, Ladies' Home Journal, with Mary Harrod Northend)
- "Pasadena, California, in Mid Winter" (1915, Harper's Bazaar)

== Personal life ==
Una Nixson married George J. Hopkins; he died in 1896, at age 30, the same year their only son, his namesake, was born. Her son, George James Hopkins, was an Oscar-winning set designer and interior decorator. Una Hopkins died in Los Angeles in 1956, aged 86 years.
