= Beauty and the Beast (1962 film) =

1962 film

- Directed by: Edward L. Cahn
- Screenplay by: George Bruce; Orville H. Hampton
- Based on: Beauty and the Beast by Jeanne-Marie Leprince de Beaumont
- Produced by: Edward Small (executive); Robert E. Kent
- Starring: Joyce Taylor; Mark Damon
- Cinematography: Gilbert Warrenton
- Edited by: Robert Carlisle
- Music by: Hugo Friedhofer
- Color process: Technicolor
- Production company: Harvard Film
- Distributed by: United Artists
- Release date: December 8, 1962
- Running time: 77 minutes
- Country: United States
- Language: English

Beauty and the Beast is a 1962 American romantic fantasy horror film directed by Edward L. Cahn and starring Joyce Taylor and Mark Damon. It is based on the 18th century fairy tale Beauty and the Beast written by Jeanne-Marie Leprince de Beaumont and features title creature make-up by the legendary Jack Pierce.

Shot in Technicolor and distributed by United Artists, the film is the first English language live action screen adaptation of the fairy tale story. Edward Small, the film's executive producer, described it as a "fairytale for everybody - no messages, no menace."

== Plot ==
Set in the Middle Ages; Lady Althea (Joyce Taylor) travels to the castle of Duke Eduardo (Mark Damon), the heir to the throne, where the two of them are to be married. But the handsome Eduardo has a horrible secret: A sorcerer's curse—an alchemist, killed by Eduardo's late father—transforms him into a terrifying, wolf-like beast every night. When Eduardo's scheming rival, Prince Bruno (Michael Pate), who also has ambitions for the throne, learns of this secret, he tries to seize the throne by stirring up the townspeople, revealing the beast's presence to them, turning them against the beast and setting them-up to kill Eduardo for him. Only the love of Lady Althea can save the duke and break the power of the curse.

== Cast ==
- Joyce Taylor as Althea
- Mark Damon as Eduardo
- Merry Anders as Sybil
- Walter Burke as Grimaldi
- Eduard Franz as Orsini
- Alexander Lockwood as Man
- Dayton Lummis as Roderick
- Michael Pate as Prince Bruno
- Herman Rudin as Pasquale
- Jon Silo as Benito
- Charles Wagenheim as Mario
- Meg Wyllie as Woman

== See also ==
- List of American films of 1962
