= George James Hopkins =

American set designer (1896–1985)

George Hopkins
- Born: George James Hopkins; March 23, 1896; Pasadena, California, US
- Died: February 11, 1985 (aged 88); Los Angeles, California
- Occupations: Set designer, playwright and production designer
- Years active: 1917-1975
- Parent: Una Nixson Hopkins

George James Hopkins (March 23, 1896 – February 11, 1985) was an American set designer, playwright and production designer.

1917 Jan 5 Los Angeles Evening Express ad for world premiere of The Play of Everyman with sets and costumes designed by 20-year-old Hopkins

Hopkins was a native of Pasadena, California; his mother Una Nixson Hopkins was a magazine writer and an art director on at least a dozen silent films. Hopkins got his start designing scenery on stage after studying design in college. He moved to films in 1917, working as an art director for various studios. During his long career, Hopkins was nominated for thirteen Academy Awards and won four.

== Connection to the murder of William Desmond Taylor ==
Hopkins had a professional and intimate relationship with silent film director William Desmond Taylor, whose unsolved murder was one of early Hollywood's biggest scandals.

On the 1922 morning that Taylor's body was found, Charles Eyton instructed Hopkins to remove a basket of documents from the murder scene, and Hopkins obeyed. Hopkins' unpublished 1981 autobiography, Caught in the Act, was used as a major source for Charles Higham's book on the Taylor murder.

== Filmography as Art Director ==
- The Day of the Locust (1975)
- 40 Carats (1973)
- Dirty Little Billy (1972)
- 1776 (1972)
- The Love Machine (1971)
- R.P.M. (1970)
- On a Clear Day You Can See Forever (1970)
- The Cheyenne Social Club (1970)
- Hello, Dolly! (1969)
- Wait Until Dark (1967)
- Hotel (1967)
- Not with My Wife, You Don't! (1966)
- Who's Afraid of Virginia Woolf? (1966)
- Inside Daisy Clover (1965)
- The Great Race (1965)
- None But the Brave (1965)
- My Fair Lady (1964)
- Palm Springs Weekend (1963)
- Rampage (1963)
- Island of Love (1963)
- Days of Wine and Roses (1962)
- The Chapman Report (1962)
- The Music Man (1962)
- Portrait of a Mobster (1961)
- A Fever in the Blood (1961)
- Sunrise at Campobello (1960)
- The Dark at the Top of the Stairs (1960)
- Cash McCall (1960)
- Auntie Mame (1958)
- Too Much, Too Soon (1958)
- Sincerely Yours (1955)
- East of Eden (1955)
- A Star Is Born (1954)
- Dial M for Murder (1954)
- So Big (1953)
- I Confess (1953)
- The Iron Mistress (1952)
- The Story of Will Rogers (1952)
- This Woman Is Dangerous (1952)
- I'll See You in My Dreams (1951)
- A Streetcar Named Desire (1951)
- Strangers on a Train (1951)
- Dallas (1950)
- The Breaking Point (1950)
- This Side of the Law (1950)
- Perfect Strangers (1950)
- The Lady Takes a Sailor (1949)
- Task Force (1949)
- Life with Father (1947)
- Deception (1946)
- Of Human Bondage (1946)
- Suspense (1946)
- One More Tomorrow (1946)
- My Reputation (1946)
- Mildred Pierce (1945)
- Roughly Speaking (1945)
- Janie (1944)
- Passage to Marseille (1944)
- Princess O'Rourke (1943)
- This Is the Army (1943)
- Mission to Moscow (1943)
- Casablanca (1942)
- The Hidden Hand (1942)
- The Soul of Youth (1920)
- Salomé (1918)
- Cleopatra (1917)

== Academy Awards ==
Over the course of his career, Hopkins was nominated 13 times for an Academy Award, all in the category of Art Direction. Today, the award is named Best Production Design, but during the 1940s and 1950s, this award recognized both Art Directors and Set Decorators with the same award. Also, prior to 1967, the Art Direction category was typically separated into different categories, one containing only Color films and the other with only Black-and-White films (the exceptions being 1957 and 1958).

Wins

- 1951 - A Streetcar Named Desire (Black-and-White)
- 1964 - My Fair Lady (Color)
- 1966 - Who's Afraid of Virginia Woolf? (Black-and-White)
- 1969 - Hello, Dolly! (Color)

Nominations

- 1943 - Mission to Moscow (Black-and-White)
- 1943 - This Is the Army (Color)
- 1947 - Life With Father (Color)
- 1954 - A Star Is Born (Color)
- 1958 - Auntie Mame (Color)
- 1960 - Sunrise at Campobello (Color)
- 1962 - Days of Wine and Roses (Black-and-White)
- 1962 - The Music Man (Color)
- 1965 - Inside Daisy Clover (Color)
