= Palm Springs Weekend =

1963 film directed by Norman Taurog

- Theatrical poster
- Directed by: Norman Taurog
- Written by: Earl Hamner Jr.
- Produced by: Michael A. Hoey
- Starring: Troy Donahue; Connie Stevens; Ty Hardin; Stefanie Powers; Robert Conrad; Jack Weston; Carole Cook; Jerry Van Dyke
- Cinematography: Harold Lipstein
- Edited by: Folmar Blangsted
- Music by: Frank Perkins
- Distributed by: Warner Bros. Pictures
- Release date: November 5, 1963
- Running time: 100 minutes
- Country: United States
- Language: English
- Budget: $1,565,000

Palm Springs Weekend is a 1963 Warner Bros. bedroom comedy film directed by Norman Taurog. It has elements of the beach party genre (AIP's Beach Party became a smash hit in July, while Warner Bros. was still putting this film together) and has been called "a sort of Westernized version of Where the Boys Are" by Billboard magazine. It stars Troy Donahue, Stefanie Powers, Robert Conrad, Ty Hardin, and Connie Stevens.

== Plot ==
A group of college students from Los Angeles travel to Palm Springs to spend the Easter weekend there. Student Jim Munroe (Troy Donahue) falls for Bunny Dixon (Stefanie Powers), the daughter of the overprotective Palm Springs police chief (Andrew Duggan). Munroe's roommate Biff Roberts (Jerry Van Dyke) and plain-jane Amanda North (Zeme North) try to seduce each other, while hampered by having to babysit an inquisitive young boy (the son of hotelier Naomi Yates, who has just met and is romancing the group's chaperone, coach Fred Campbell). Spoiled rich playboy Eric Dean (Robert Conrad) and Hollywood stuntman from Texas Doug Fortune (Ty Hardin) compete for the attentions of a pretty girl (Connie Stevens) from Beverly Hills. A wild auto chase between Eric and Doug ensues after an evening at a folk music club in Las Vegas. Doug is injured in a serious crash, but recovers. The group returns to Los Angeles.

== Cast ==
- Troy Donahue as Jim Munroe
- Connie Stevens as Gail Lewis/Jane Hoover
- Ty Hardin as Doug 'Stretch' Fortune
- Stefanie Powers as Bunny Dixon
- Robert Conrad as Eric Dean
- Andrew Duggan as Police Chief Dixon
- Jack Weston as Coach Fred Campbell
- Carole Cook as Naomi Yates
- Jerry Van Dyke as Biff Roberts
- Zeme North as Amanda North
- Bill Mumy as 'Boom Boom' Yates (the son of hotelier)
- Dorothy Green as Cora Dixon
- Robert Gothie as Gabby
- Greg Benedict as Hap
- Gary Kinkaid as Fred
- Mark Dempsey as Mike
- Jim Shane as Dave
- Rafael Guzman-Sanchez as Waiter
- Mel Blanc as Bugs Bunny Doll (voice) (uncredited)
- Dabbs Greer as Boys' Club Leader (uncredited)
- Tina Cole as Ruth Stewart (uncredited)

=== Cast notes ===
- Syndicated columnist, radio and television talk show host and personality Shirley Eder makes a cameo as herself in the record store scene.
- Mike Henry plays the parking valet at the Riviera Hotel.
- Dawn Wells and Linda Gray appear as featured extras in non-speaking roles.
- Connie Stevens, Robert Conrad, Tina Cole, and Troy Donahue all appeared in the 1959–63 TV series Hawaiian Eye.

== Production notes ==
=== Development ===
Jack L. Warner was impressed by the success of Where the Boys Are (1960). He wanted to make a similar film about the influx of teenagers into Palm Springs during the Easter vacation break, using the large number of young actors they had under contract. The studio had the title, Palm Springs Weekend even before they had a script.

In June 1962, Warner gave the job of producing to Michael A. Hoey, who had never produced before, but had impressed Warner through his work as an editor at the studio over four years, most recently The Chapman Report. The studio signed Hoey to a contract as producer and Palm Springs Weekend was going to be his first movie.

Earl Hamner Jr., whose novel Spencer's Mountain had just been bought by Warners, was hired to write the screenplay. Hamner:

They gave the screenplay duties [on Spencer's Mountain] to someone else, and I think Mr. Warner thought that he owed me one. He called me one day and asked me what I thought of Palm Springs. I was just newly arrived from New York, and I told him that I'd never been there. He said, 'I want you to go there over Easter Weekend and poke around and see if you come back with a movie.' ... I suppose since he'd just done Spencer's Mountain, he trusted that I could write about young people.

When Norman Taurog signed to direct, he felt the script needed some work, so the studio hired David Schwartz, who had just adapted Sex and the Single Girl. They did not like his work so another writer was hired, Danny Arnold, to do a weekly polish.

There was some criticism of the script from Palm Springs public officials.

=== Casting ===
The lead actors were all under contract to Warner Bros, apart from Stefanie Powers and Jerry Van Dyke. Tuesday Weld was originally considered for the role of Gail, before Connie Stevens was cast. Troy Donahue was always considered for the part of Jim Munroe. Donahue says he refused to play the role – "nobody thought this was the kind of movie that would be particularly advantageous to our careers" – but the studio put him on suspension. He ran out of money and agreed to make the film.

Ty Hardin's character was written especially for him as Hoey was impressed by his work in The Chapman Report. Steve Trilling of Warners wanted the part of Eric to be played by Edd Byrnes but Hoey went with Robert Conrad instead. "Palm Springs Weekend was an incredible break for me", said Conrad later. "I saw an opportunity to do some real acting."

Some reports say that Donahue's wife Suzanne Pleshette was considered to play Bunny, but Hoey says this was never the case as she was too mature; Stefanie Powers was borrowed from Columbia for the part.

=== Shooting ===
Filming went from February 10 through May 16, 1963. It was filmed on location in Palm Springs, as well as in the studio at Warners.

Troy Donahue later recalled:

The best thing about the film was that it was being made in Palm Springs. And I was there to drink and get laid. I remember that a friend of mine and I started at opposite ends of town. Halfway through the movie, we crossed paths. I got everything he got going in his direction, and he got everything I got coming in mine. I mean, the picture was tame compared to the reality.

Connie Stevens later said "By far, that film was one of the most fun times of my life."

The two resorts seen in the film are the Riviera Hotel on North Indian Canyon Drive; and the Desert Palms Inn – seen onscreen as "Las Casa Yates" – on Jones Road in Cathedral City. The two hotels served as location for much of the film, both the actual locations and their soundstage replicas. Set design was by George Hopkins.

The car that Eric Dean drives is a silver 1963 Ford Thunderbird, while Doug Fortune's car is shown as a red 1957 Mercury Montclair. When Fortune's car is wrecked, however, he is pulled from a red 1954 Mercury Monterey.

Cora Dixon's dialogue regarding Easter vacation ("I don't know how your father is going to stand all those teenagers – and the income tax deadline – all in the same week") appears to indicate that the film's setting is specifically April 1963, when Easter Sunday fell on April 14, the day before Tax Day.

=== Music ===
Frank Perkins composed the score for the film. Larry Kusik and Paul Evans wrote one song that appears in the finished film, "Live Young." It is sung over the opening credits by Troy Donahue, an instrumental version is heard during the party scene at Ruth Stewart's house.

The Modern Folk Quartet appear as themselves in the sequence at Jack's Casino and are shown singing two songs, "The Ox Driver's Song" and one unidentified song.

Ty Hardin sings an a cappella version of the traditional "The Yellow Rose of Texas", and sings with Jerry Van Dyke on Ray Henderson and Mort Dixon's standard, "Bye Bye Blackbird."

Musical excerpts from the film soundtrack were released as a long-playing vinyl recording in 1963. The album was reissued on compact disc by Intrada Records in 2017.

== Release ==
The film was released to decent reviews. It was not a major success at the box office but made a profit for the studio.

Reviewing the film in the present day, Rod Lott wrote:

Palm Springs Weekend packs itself with so many people and so many storylines, it fails to give accurate time to let any of them play out to a point we recognize as "plot." And that’s okay, because it’s a helluva good time. When your big set piece is Biff accidentally spilling a bottle of detergent into the hotel pool ... your movie isn’t aiming any higher than the funny bone.

The movie had a long life on television and video. Earl Hamner later recalled, "When the phone rings around midnight, I know it's someone calling to tell me, 'Earl, Palm Springs Weekend is on'."

Robert Conrad says his performance impressed Warners enough for them to keep him under contract for a number of years. Troy Donahue later complained that the film was "really bad ... a beach movie set in the desert".

A book of the same title by Marvin H. Albert was released by Dell Publishing at the same time.

=== Home media ===
The DVD was released in 2009. The DVD is part of the Warner Bros. Romance Classics Collection, which also contains three other films starring Troy Donahue: Parrish (1961), Rome Adventure (1962) and Susan Slade (1961).

== Novelization ==
Slightly in advance of the film's release, as was the custom of the era, a paperback novelization of the film was published by Dell Books. The author was renowned crime and western novelist Marvin H. Albert, who also made something of a cottage industry out of movie tie-ins. He seems to have been the most prolific screenplay novelizer of the late '50s through mid '60s, and, during that time, the preeminent specialist at light comedy.

== See also ==
- List of American films of 1963
