= Robert Gothie =

American actor

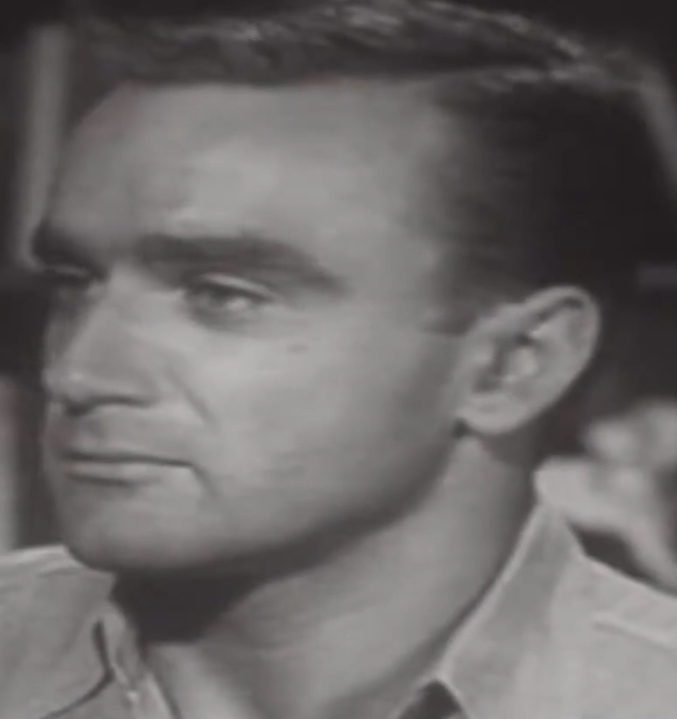
- Gothie in an episode of Lock-Up (1959)
- Born: October 2, 1929; Hazleton, Pennsylvania
- Died: June 18, 1993 (aged 63); San Francisco, California
- Occupation: Actor
- Years active: 1957–1965

Robert Gothie (October 2, 1929 – June 18, 1993) was an American actor from Hazleton, Pennsylvania who appeared on television, in the movies and on Broadway in the 1950s and 1960s.

== Career ==
Originally from Hazelton, Pennsylvania, Gothie played guest roles in TV series such as Sugarfoot, Sea Hunt, My Three Sons and The Virginian. He got a chance at a regular role as Private Sam Hanson in the short-lived World War II series The Gallant Men.

== Filmography ==
- This Man Dawson (1959)
- The Man and the Challenge (1960)
- Sea Hunt (1960 (1 episode)
- The Life and Legend of Wyatt Earp (1960) (1 episode)
- The Aquanauts (1960) (1 episode)
- Sanctuary (1961)
- Lock-Up (1959-1961)
- My Three Sons (1961) (1 episode)
- Room for One More (1962) (1 episode)
- 77 Sunset Strip (1962) (1 episode)
- The Everglades (1962) (1 episode)
- The Gallant Men as Sam Hanson (1962–1963)
- Palm Springs Weekend (1963)
- The Virginian (1 episode) (1964)
- Wendy and Me (1 episode) (1965)
