= Scottish Rite Cathedral (Pasadena, California) =

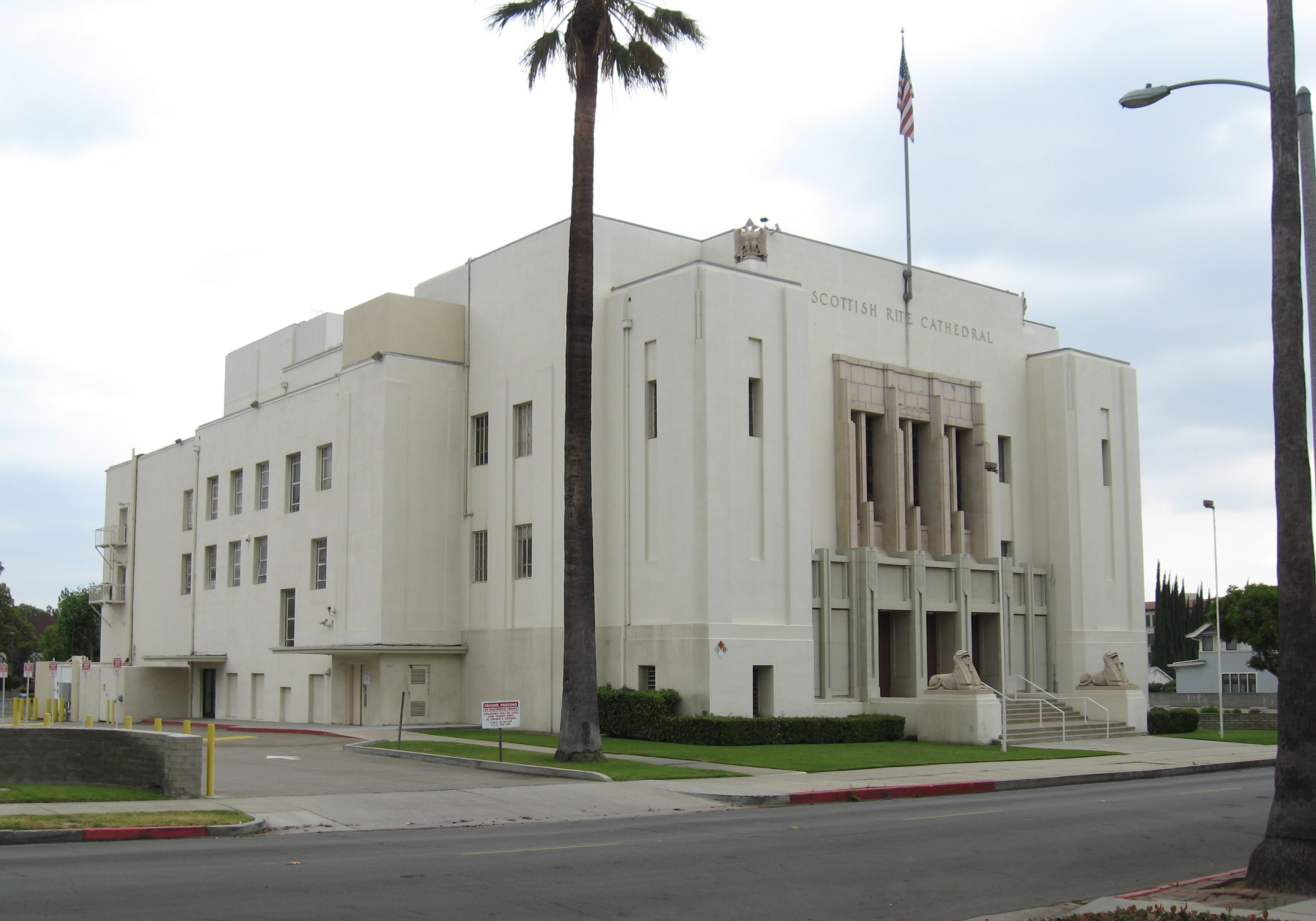
- Interactive map of the Scottish Rite Cathedral area

General information
- Architectural style: Moderne, Zig Zag Moderne
- Location: 150 N. Madison Ave., Pasadena, California
- Coordinates: 34.148456°N 118.138041°W
- Completed: 1925

Design and construction
- Architects: Blick, Joseph J.; Crowell, W.C.

Scottish Rite Cathedral in Pasadena, California was built in 1925 in a Moderne and/or Zig Zag Moderne style.

Architecturally significant in greater Los Angeles as a pre-PWA Classical Moderne building with distinctive decorative guardian sphinxes, the Scottish Rite Cathedral is associated strongly with the social history of Pasadena, in particular with the Scottish Rite, an appendant body associated with Freemasonry.

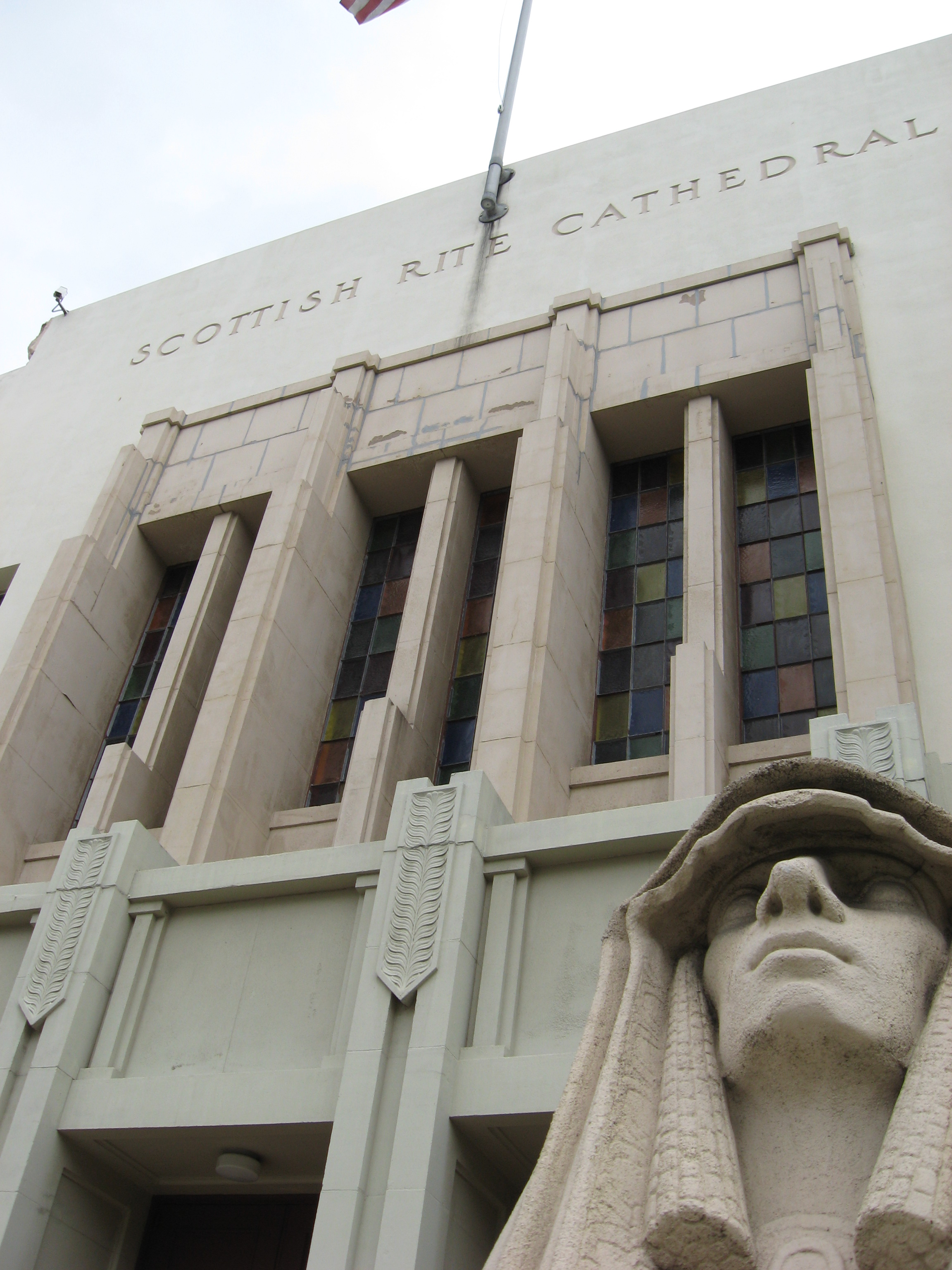
Detail of one of the sphinx-like statues and facade, in 2009

The building was designed and/or built by Joseph J. Blick and W.C. Crowell. Joseph Blick is remembered for the Scottish Rite Cathedral and designed many homes in Pasadena.

In 1984, the building was deemed eligible for listing on the National Register of Historic Places based on its importance and documentation thereof, but the building was not finally listed (NRIS reference number 84003894, decision date October 3, 1984). The listing was cancelled due to owner objection, which under terms of the National Register program, vetoes the listing.

The building was built in 1925. It cost approximately $300,000, was described as magnificently furnished and was dedicated at a ceremony on February 18, 1925 attended by approximately 1700 high-degree masons and their families.

As of 2020, the building is still in use by the Scottish Rite organization.
