= Ring of Fire (Duane Eddy song) =

Single by Duane Eddy
- B-side: "Bobbie"
- Released: May 1961
- Genre: Rockabilly
- Length: 2:20
- Label: Jamie Records 1187
- Songwriter(s): Duane Eddy

Duane Eddy singles chronology
"Theme from Dixie" (1961)	"Ring of Fire" (1961)	"Drivin' Home" (1961)

"Ring of Fire" is a song written and performed by Duane Eddy. The song reached #17 on the UK Singles Chart and #84 on the Billboard Hot 100 in 1961.

The song appears in the 1961 movie Ring of Fire.
