= The Gallant Men =

Television series

- William Reynolds and Robert McQueeney in The Gallant Men
- Created by: Richard Bluel
- Starring: William Reynolds; Robert McQueeney
- Theme music composer: Howard Jackson
- Country of origin: United States
- No. of seasons: 1
- No. of episodes: 26

Production
- Executive producer: William T. Orr
- Running time: 60 minutes

Original release
- Network: ABC
- Release: October 5, 1962 – March 30, 1963

The Gallant Men is a 1962–1963 ABC Warner Bros. Television series which depicted an infantry company of American soldiers fighting their way through Italy in World War II.

== Description ==
The Gallant Men dramatized the experiences of the fictional Able Company within the 36th Infantry Division, Fifth Army, beginning with the division's amphibious landing at Salerno, Italy, on September 9, 1943. The pilot episode was directed by Robert Altman.

The company's commander was Capt. Jim Benedict, played by William Reynolds, who later appeared in the series, The F.B.I. Their exploits were narrated by a newspaper correspondent — Conley Wright, played by Robert McQueeney — who accompanied them on their missions. The show lasted only one season. It succumbed to tough competition from the other networks and tepid responses from critics and audiences. The show also faced unfavorable comparisons with ABC's other World War II series launched the same year, Combat!.

The Gallant Men tended to be formulaic in plotting and characterization, with such stereotypes as ladies' man PFC Pete D'Angelo (played by Eddie Fontaine), hard-as-nails Sgt. John McKenna (Richard X. Slattery), and inseparable buddies Pvt. Ernie Lucavich (Roland La Starza) and Pvt. Sam Hanson (Robert Gothie). The regular cast would unrealistically dispatch large numbers of German troops while experiencing minimal or no injuries themselves in the Italian campaign, where historically the Allies suffered heavy casualties from determined German resistance that lasted until the end of World War II in Europe. Although promotional materials for the series promised a dramatization of the Italian campaign from Salerno to Rome, the series played out nearly in real time. Its 26 episodes take place between September 1943 and early spring 1944.

The series blended original footage with shots from wartime newsreels and stock footage from Warner Bros. war films such as Force of Arms, Darby's Rangers and A Walk in the Sun.

== Regular cast ==
- William Reynolds as Capt. Jim Benedict
- Robert McQueeney as Conley Wright
- Robert Ridgely as Lt. Frank Kimbro
- Richard X. Slattery as 1st Sgt. John McKenna
- Eddie Fontaine as PFC Pete D'Angelo
- Roland La Starza as Pvt. Ernie Lucavich
- Roger Davis as Pvt. Roger Gibson
- Robert Gothie as Pvt. Sam Hanson

== Episodes ==
No.	Title	Directed by	Written by	Original release date
1	"Battle Zone"	Robert Altman	Story by : James Merriam Moore; Teleplay by : Halsted Welles	October 5, 1962
2	"Retreat to Concord"	Richard C. Sarafian	Story by : Leonard Brown; Teleplay by : William Bruckner	October 12, 1962
3	"And Cain Cried Out"	Charles R. Rondeau	Ken Pettus	October 19, 1962
4	"The Ninety-Eight Cent Man"	Richard C. Sarafian	Richard L. Adams	October 26, 1962
5	"One Moderately Peaceful Sunday"	Richard C. Sarafian	Montgomery Pittman	November 2, 1962
6	"Lesson for a Lover"	Charles R. Rondeau	Story by : Richard M. Bluel; Teleplay by : Richard Landau & Jerry Davis	November 9, 1962
7	"And the End of Evil Things"	Richard C. Sarafian	David Lang	November 16, 1962
8	"Some Tears Fall Dry"	Charles R. Rondeau	Don Tait	November 23, 1962
9	"Fury in a Quiet Village"	Richard C. Sarafian	Stephen Lord	November 30, 1962
10	"Signals for an End Run"	Richard C. Sarafian	Story by : Arthur Fitz-Richard & William D'Angelo; Teleplay by : David Giler & Berne Giler	December 7, 1962
11	"Robertino"	Charles R. Rondeau	Herman Groves	December 14, 1962
12	"A Place to Die"	Charles R. Rondeau	Herman Groves	December 21, 1962
13	"Advance and Be Recognized"	Robert Totten	James O'Hanlon & George O'Hanlon	December 29, 1962
14	"To Hold Up a Mirror"	Charles R. Rondeau	Charles B. Smith	January 5, 1963
15	"Boast Not of Tomorrow"	Charles R. Rondeau	Ken Pettus	January 12, 1963
16	"The Dogs of War"	Charles R. Rondeau	Story by : Jason Wingreen]] Teleplay by : Jason Wingreen & Ken Pettus	January 19, 1963
17	"The Bridge"	Richard C. Sarafian	Herman Groves	January 26, 1963
18	"The Leathernecks"	Charles R. Rondeau	Teleplay by : Ken Pettus; Based on a play by : Andrew Rosenthal	February 2, 1963
19	"Next of Kin"	Robert Sparr	Ken Pettus	February 9, 1963
20	"Operation Secret"	Richard C. Sarafian	Teleplay by : Richard Landau; Magazine Story by : Elton Floring	February 16, 1963
21	"The Warriors"	Richard C. Sarafian	Teleplay by : Richard Landau; Magazine Story by : Richard Macaulay	February 23, 1963
22	"One Puka Puka"	Leslie H. Martinson	David Lang	March 2, 1963
23	"Ol' Buddy"	Richard L. Bare	William Koenig	March 9, 1963
24	"A Taste of Peace"	Richard C. Sarafian	Ken Pettus	March 16, 1963
25	"The Crucible"	Charles R. Rondeau	Story by : William L. Stuart; Teleplay by : Don Tait	March 23, 1963
26	"Tommy"	Charles R. Rondeau	James O'Hanlon & George O'Hanlon	March 30, 1963

== Development ==
Warner Bros. television producer William T. Orr tried as early as 1960 to generate interest in a weekly dramatic series set in World War II. The early concept was called Battle Zone. The reception he found from the three major TV networks was lukewarm at best. "It wasn't that the networks were hostile to the idea," Orr told The New York Times in 1962. "They seemed to be in a kind of morass of indecision about it." Orr also predicted that, if Gallant Men were successful, networks would warm to more series set during the war. Looking for more original programming in its 1962-63 TV season, ABC gave the green light to Battle Zone, which was re-titled The Gallant Men.

The pilot episode was budgeted at $170,000 ($1.46 million in 2020 dollars). In preparation for shooting, director Robert Altman and story editor Richard Bluel screened John Huston's 1945 documentary The Battle of San Pietro. Eight days were spent on production, broken down into one day each for tests and post-production, and six shooting days. Primary filming took place in December 1961 and January 1962. Warner Bros. offered Altman a contract to continue directing the series, but the director found himself dissatisfied with Warner's production style and accepted an offer from Combat! executive producer Selig J. Seligman instead.

Members of the principal cast received basic military training on the Warner backlot over the spring of 1962, led by two veterans of the Italian campaign, Maj. Richard Lauer and SFC Robert McClintic. The cast familiarized themselves with action sequences using trenches and bomb craters dug by studio special effects personnel.

In May 1962, Army Lt. Col. David Sisco was tapped to be the series' military adviser. By coincidence, Sisco was friends with. Maj. Homer Jones, the technical adviser for Combat! Sisco served in the 36th Infantry Division in Italy, the group depicted in The Gallant Men. His job wasn't just limited to teaching the actors how to properly shoot; at times, Sisco and his Army superiors nixed or altered storylines so as not to cast soldiers or the Army itself in a negative light. At least one television critic said such changes weakened the show.

== Cancellation and syndication ==
In December 1962 ABC cancelled The Roy Rogers and Dale Evans Show, opening an hour-long gap (7:30 – 8:30 p.m. ET) in the network's Saturday primetime schedule. Gallant Men was moved into that timeslot. By February 1963, doubtful reports began to circulate about The Gallant Men's future. Late that month, ABC announced it would not order a second season, and the same week William T. Orr was removed as head of Warner's television division. Warner Bros. then tried to sell commissioned but unproduced episode scripts to Combat! That effort may have borne fruit, as three episodes from the second season of Combat! are credited to Gallant Men writers.

Before the year was out, Warner Bros. was selling the series' 26 episodes to local stations across the country as part of its syndicated program offerings. A magazine ad in February 1964 claimed Gallant Men reruns beat first-run network programming in the New York City television market, and that the series was running in 20 markets across the United States. The series remained part of Warner Bros.' television syndication package until at least 1968.

== Home media ==
On July 24, 2012, Warner Bros. released The Gallant Men: The Complete Series on DVD in Region 1 via their Warner Archive Collection. This is a Manufacture-on-Demand (MOD) release, available exclusively in the US and only through Warner's online store.

== Tie-ins ==
- Eddie Fontaine sang lyrics to Sy Miller's end title song "My Heart Belongs to You" on one episode with Warner Bros. Records releasing the song on 45 rpm
- Louis Marx and Company released a 1963 military playset with character figures from the show joining the usual American toy soldiers.
- In 1966, Senator Everett McKinley Dirksen recorded the song "Gallant Men." It became a hit in the U.S., reaching #29 on the Billboard Hot 100 during the winter of 1967. It also reached #100 in Canada.
- In 1963, Dell Publishing produced one issue of a comic book based on the show. The comic book contained two original standalone stories not drawn from the broadcast episodes.
