= Ring of Fire (1961 film) =

1961 American film directed by Andrew L. Stone

- Directed by: Andrew L. Stone
- Screenplay by: Andrew L. Stone
- Produced by: Andrew L. Stone
- Starring: David Janssen; Joyce Taylor; Frank Gorshin
- Cinematography: William H. Clothier
- Edited by: Virginia L. Stone
- Music by: Duane Eddy
- Production company: Metro-Goldwyn-Mayer
- Distributed by: Metro-Goldwyn-Mayer
- Release date: June 14, 1961
- Running time: 91 minutes
- Country: United States
- Language: English

Ring of Fire is a 1961 American Metrocolor drama film directed by Andrew L. Stone and starring David Janssen, Joyce Taylor and Frank Gorshin. The film was shot in Vernonia, Oregon and Wynoochee River, Washington, featuring footage from two real forest fires. The title song was written and performed by Duane Eddy.

== Plot ==
Deputy sheriff Steve Walsh and his partner encounter a trio of young people in Washington between Shelton and Aberdeen. After being taken hostage when the girl, Bobbie, produces a gun, the two deputies are forced by their captors into rural Mason County forests as the group flees an ever-growing search party. Bobbie later tries to seduce Walsh - twice her age - who resists. One of her companions, Roy, tries to push Walsh off a cliff, but plummets to his own death instead.

When the search party comes to Walsh's rescue, Frank, the other captor, accuses Walsh of improper relations with Bobbie, who is a minor. Before the matter can be resolved, all realize that Frank's carelessly tossed cigarette has set the forest ablaze, threatening the town.

Walsh leads an evacuation of the townspeople and herds them aboard a train that leads across a bridge to safety. Frank, trying to flee, falls from the trestle and is killed. The bridge collapses, and the train goes down with it. The movie ends as Walsh tells Bobbie that she is special to him and professes his love by kissing her.

== Cast ==
- David Janssen as Sergeant Steve Walsh
- Joyce Taylor as Bobbie 'Skidoo' Adams
- Frank Gorshin as Frank Henderson
- Joel Marston as Deputy Joe Pringle
- Jim Johnson as Roy Anderson
- Ron Myron as Sheriff Tom Niles, Mason County
- Marshall Kent as Deputy
- Doodles Weaver as Mr. Hobart

== See also ==
- List of American films of 1961
