= Atlantis, the Lost Continent =

1961 film by George Pal

- Theatrical release poster
- Directed by: George Pal
- Screenplay by: Daniel Mainwaring
- Based on: Atalanta, a Story of Atlantis; 1949 play by Gerald Hargreaves
- Produced by: George Pal
- Starring: Anthony Hall; Joyce Taylor; John Dall; William Smith; Edward Platt; Frank DeKova
- Narrated by: Paul Frees
- Cinematography: Harold E. Wellman
- Edited by: Ben Lewis
- Music by: Russell Garcia
- Distributed by: Metro-Goldwyn-Mayer
- Release date: May 3, 1961
- Running time: 90 minutes
- Country: United States
- Language: English
- Box office: $1.5 million

Atlantis, the Lost Continent is a 1961 American science fiction film in Metrocolor produced and directed by George Pal and starring Sal Ponti (under the screen name of Anthony Hall), Joyce Taylor, and John Dall. The film was distributed by Metro-Goldwyn-Mayer. It was the last film for John Dall.

The film's storyline concerns the events leading up to the total destruction of the mythical continent of Atlantis during the time of Ancient Greece.

== Plot ==
The Greek fisherman Demetrios and his father rescue Princess Antillia from a shipwreck without knowing that she is from the technologically advanced civilization of Atlantis. After rescuing the princess, Demetrios must travel beyond the Pillars of Hercules to take her home. After they are picked up at sea near Atlantis by a giant fish-like submarine boat, Demetrios, expecting to receive a reward for returning Antillia, is instead enslaved and forced to work in the crater of the volcano that dominates the center of the continent.

King Cronus is being manipulated by an ambitious usurper, Zaren, collaborating with the court sorcerer, Sonoy the Astrologer, who wishes to use the resources of Atlantis to conquer the known world. From deep within the continent's volcano, the slaves of Atlantis have been mining unique power crystals which absorb the sun's rays and can be used to fire heat ray beams. The crystals were once used to produce light and heat, but due to its arrogance, corruption, and moral laxity, Atlantis has made the crystals into a deadly heat ray weapon. It has become "an abomination before Heaven".

Taken to the House of Fear, where a mad scientist turns slaves into mindless beast-humans, Demetrios is saved by being given the chance to undergo the "ordeal of fire and water". He fights with a giant ogre in a pit of burning coals. Demetrios outmaneuvers his clumsy opponent, setting fire to the ogre's hair. The fight contrasts with the uproarious laughter coming from the massive crowd in the coliseum, cheering on the spectacle. Later, after killing the ogre in a rising pool of water, Demetrios is declared a free citizen of Atlantis.

Impending doom hangs heavy in the air of Atlantis. The birds, animals, and even the insects are fleeing what appears to be the coming destruction of the continent. With the help of a kindly high-priest named Azar, who explains these signs of the apocalypse to him, Demetrios is later able to rescue Princess Antillia after helping the slaves to escape the coming destruction. Azar explains and demonstrates two small versions of the power crystal device. He also informs Demetrios that a huge crystal ray projector, a thousand times more powerful, is nearing completion. On the next full moon, Zaren plans to begin his campaign of conquest.

Demetrios pretends to ally himself with Zaren, supposedly working among the slaves to ensure that the crystal is completed on schedule. In fact, he is working with the slaves to sabotage the process. The crystals are formed deep within the volcano, hastening the impending destruction of Atlantis.

On the full moon, the now-completed crystal ray projector is displayed to the people of Atlantis. Just at that moment, however, the skies darken, the ground begins to shake, and the destruction of Atlantis begins. The volcano undergoes a cataclysmic eruption, and the continent proceeds to tear itself apart. The people of Atlantis panic, striving to escape their impending doom. Demetrios and Princess Antillia attempt to escape through the fleeing multitude. Zaren attempts to kill them, using the crystal ray projector, but instead kills many other citizens.

Azar attacks Zaren, using Zaren's own knife, leaving the large crystal to swing back and forth, out of control, firing bursts of energy at random. As Zaren finally overcomes Azar, he is himself destroyed by the weapon's energy beam. As lightning flashes and thunder roars, the entire continent begins sinking. Suddenly, and very quickly, it begins to rise; then, just as quickly, the sea bottom collapses. Atlantis suddenly plunges beneath the waves once and for all. The large crystal device atop the capital's large pyramid, the main power source for the entire continent, is inundated with seawater, short-circuits, and a massive explosion follows.

Various groups of survivors, including Demetrios and Antillia, flee to Greece and other parts of the world, where they are absorbed into other cultures, and the legend of Atlantis is spread through the many peoples and nations that follow down through the centuries.

== Cast ==
Actor	Role
Sal Ponti (as Anthony Hall)	Demetrios
Joyce Taylor	Princess Antillia
John Dall	Zaren
William Smith	Captain of the Guard
Edward Platt	Azar the High Priest
Frank DeKova	Sonoy the Astrologer
Berry Kroeger	Surgeon
Edgar Stehli	King Cronus [Kronos]
Wolfe Barzell	Petros, Demetrios' Father
Jay Novello	Xandros the Greek Slave
Paul Frees	Narrator/multiple voices

== Production ==
=== Development ===
In the late 1950s George Pal signed a deal with MGM to make Tom Thumb. The movie was a success and in May 1958 Pal announced his intention to make a series of follow up movies for the studio, including The Time Machine, The Brothers Grimm, Lost Eden (about Captain Cook), and a film about Atlantis.

In May 1960 the film was officially put on MGM's production slate by head of production Sol C. Siegel - it was the first movie announced at the studio since the resolution of the actors' strike. The script by Daniel Mainwaring had already been completed.

In June 1960 Paul announced that Italian sword and sandal actor Fabrizio Mioni, best known for his portrayal of Jason in Hercules had been signed as the lead. Jon Dall, who had just been in Spartacus was cast as the villain. Then Mioni's work visa expired and he had to leave the U. S. so he was replaced by Sal Ponti (called Anthony Hall).

Other actors considered were Richard Chamberlain and William Shatner.

=== Shooting ===
Filming started in July 1960. The film had several sequences filmed off Santa Catalina Island, California.

The film is notorious for its inclusion of stock footage from other films, including the Oscar-winning Quo Vadis and The Naked Jungle. Props from other film productions were also reused, including the large temple idol from The Prodigal, Krell instrument gauges from Forbidden Planet, and wardrobes from Diane and Ben-Hur. When pointed out to George Pal that there were thousands of years of difference between the various costumes and props, he replied "Who knows"?

The special effects and miniature work for Atlantis, the Lost Continent, which uses ancient Greek and Roman-style buildings, temples, the giant crystal ray weapon, the volcano, and showcased the destruction of Atlantis, were the work of the special effects production company Project Unlimited. These were supervised by Gene Warren, Wah Chang, and Jim Danforth, along with the MGM production staff supervised by A. Arnold Gillespie. They coordinated their work with George Pal, who worked closely with the production designer and art director George W. Davis and William Ferrari.

The film's prologue, describing the legend of Atlantis, utilizes stop motion animation by producer George Pal that he had developed earlier in his career for his innovative Puppetoons series.

Voice actor Paul Frees provides the opening and closing narration and is also heard as the dubbed voice of the hero's father, as well as the ruler of Atlantis; unusually for the era, he is given billing in the opening credits.

== Reception ==
The film generally received poor reviews and was described by film critic Leonard Maltin in his 2002 Movie & Video Guide as "Pal's worst film", writing that it had "poor effects" and that it was: "Occasionally funny – but not on purpose". Author David Wingrove had similar criticisms in his Science Fiction Film Source Book: "No expense was spared in buying up footage from Quo Vadis to give it true period flavour. Avoid".

At a preview screening for the film, questionnaires were handed out to the audience asking what scene was their favorite. One person, apparently recognizing the footage taken from Quo Vadis, wrote "The scene where Robert Taylor saved Deborah Kerr from the fire".

== Comic book adaptation ==
- Dell Four Color #1188 (May 1961)
