= Joyce Taylor =

American actress (1937–2024)

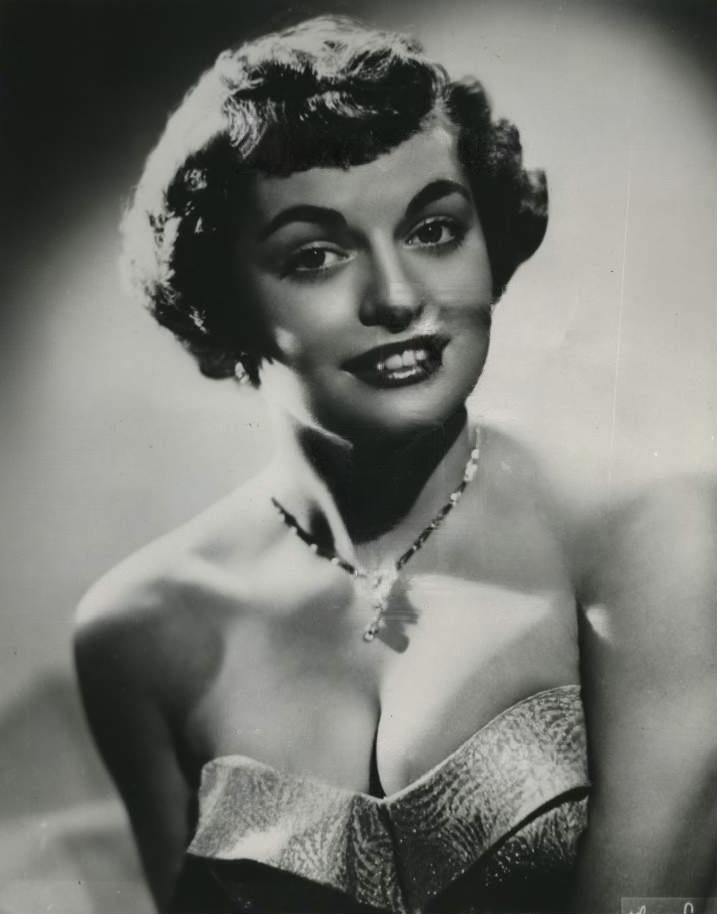
- Taylor in 1964
- Born: Joyce Crowder; September 14, 1937; Taylorville, Illinois, U.S.
- Died: January 2024 (aged 86); Fort Collins, Colorado, U.S.
- Other names: Joyce Bradley
- Occupation: Actress
- Years active: 1953–1971
- Spouse(s): Edward Bellinson (m. 1961; div. 19??); Richard Hinnant (m. 19??)

Joyce Taylor (born Joyce Crowder; September 14, 1937 – January 2024) was an American actress. She starred in feature films and television primarily during the 1950s and 1960s.

== Early life ==
Born in Taylorville, Illinois on September 14, 1937, she based her stage name on her hometown. A coal miner's daughter, she attended public schools in Taylorville and was the top baton twirler at Taylorville High School. Her performance in a school talent show led to a recording contract.

== Career ==
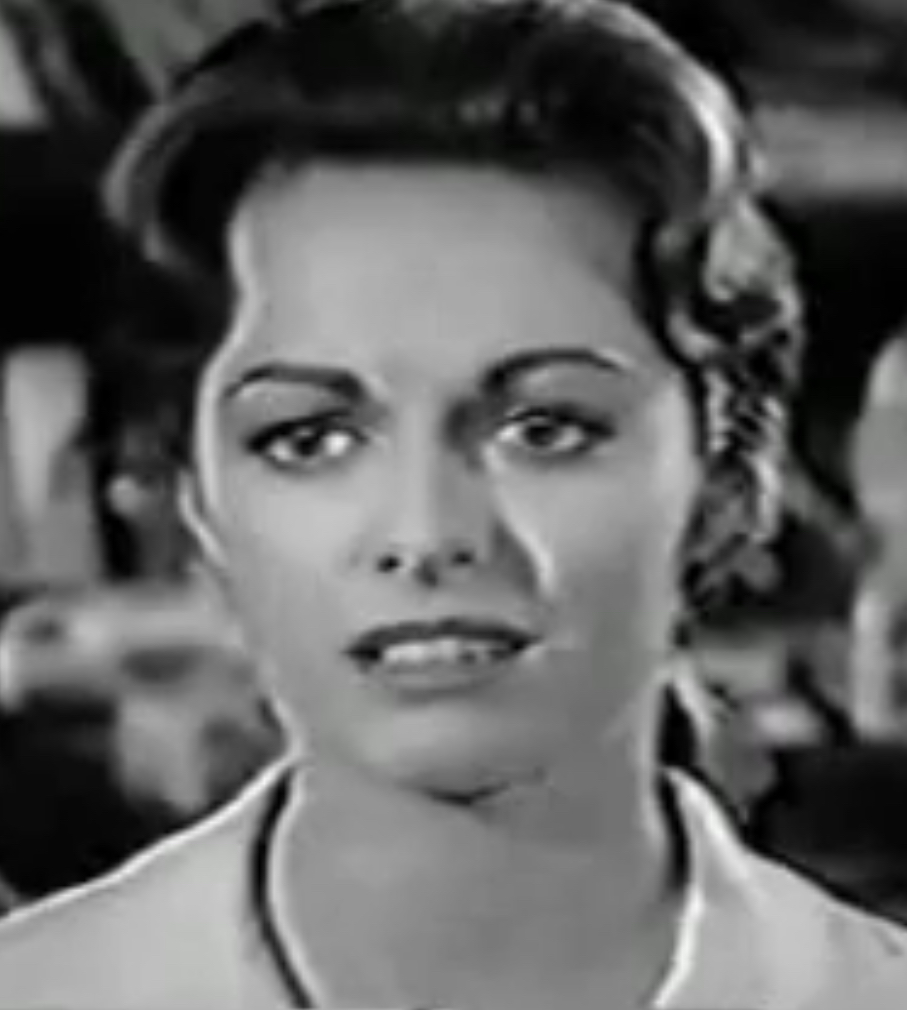
Taylor in an episode of Lock-Up (1959)

Taylor sang in amateur shows at age 10 and turned professional at age 15, signing with Mercury Records (billed as Joyce Bradley). When she was 16, she was singing at Chez Paree nightclub in Chicago and other similar venues.

She was under contract to Howard Hughes-owned RKO Pictures in the 1950s, but he only allowed her to act in one movie (a small part in Beyond a Reasonable Doubt in 1956). When her seven-year contract ended, she became a regular on the science-fiction adventure TV series Men into Space (1959–1960) as well as acted in many other TV shows and several feature films.

== Personal life and death ==
Taylor married stockbroker Edward Bellinson. She later married Richard Hinnant. Taylor died in Fort Collins, Colorado in January 2024, at the age of 87.

== Selected filmography ==
=== Film ===
- 1956: Beyond a Reasonable Doubt
- 1959: The FBI Story
- 1961: Atlantis, the Lost Continent
- 1961: Ring of Fire
- 1962: Beauty and the Beast
- 1963: Twice-Told Tales

=== Television ===
- 1958: The Real McCoys
- 1958: 77 Sunset Strip
- 1959: Sea Hunt
- 1959: Lawman
- 1959: Lock-Up
- 1959: The Adventures of Ozzie and Harriet
- 1959: The Gale Storm Show
- 1959–1960: Men into Space
- 1960: Bat Masterson (episode: “Cattle and Canes” as Rancher Jane Taylor)
- 1960: The Untouchables
- 1960–1962: Tales of Wells Fargo
- 1962: Bonanza (episode: "The War Comes to Washoe" as Morvath Terry)
- 1962: Wagon Train
- 1963: 13 Frightened Girls
- 1964: The Man from U.N.C.L.E.
- 1964–1965: The Littlest Hobo
