= Joseph Blick =

American architect (1867–1947)

Joseph James Blick
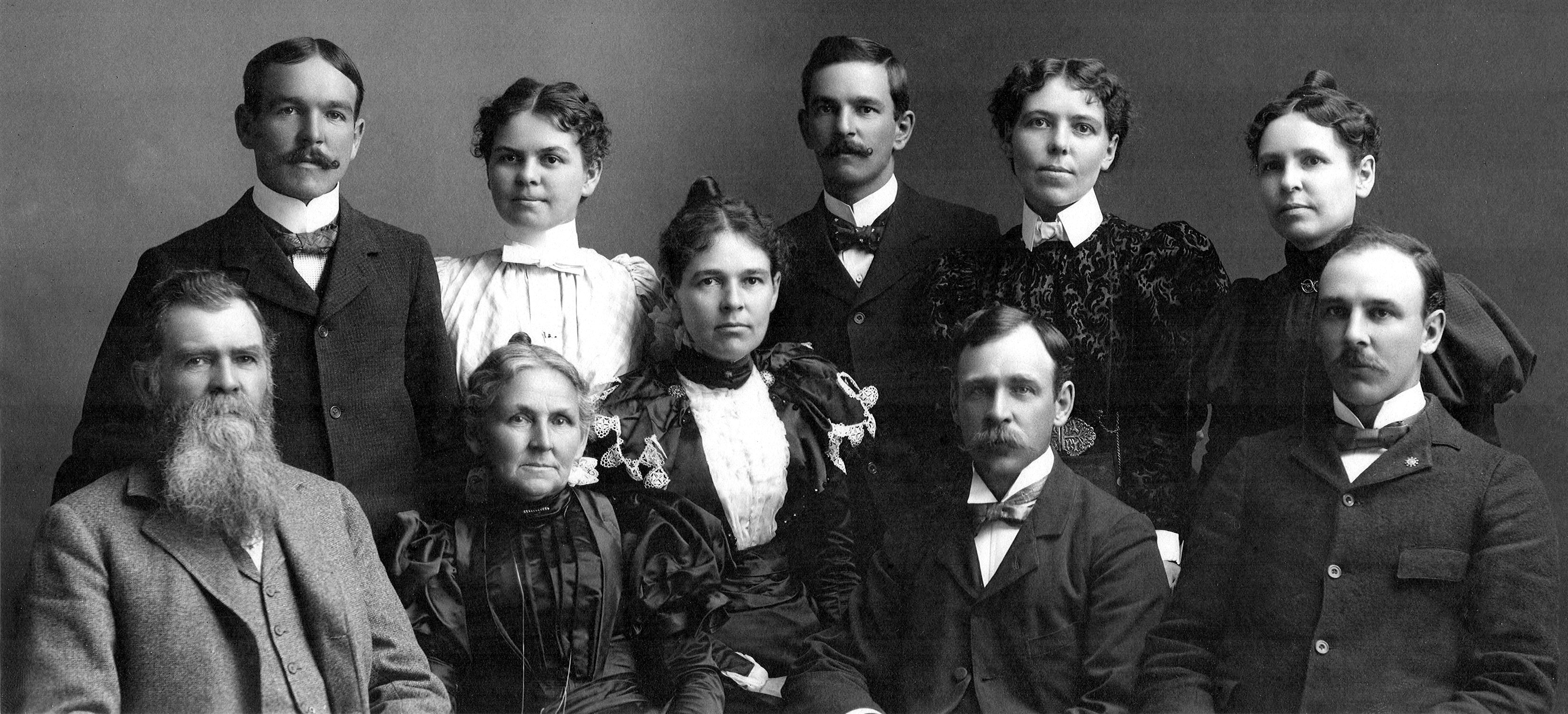
- Blick family c. 1892, Joseph: front right
- Born: September 20, 1867; Clinton, Iowa, U.S.
- Died: September 5, 1947 (aged 79); Pasadena, California, U.S.
- Occupation: Architect
- Spouse: Daisy Russell Blick
- Buildings: Scottish Rite Cathedral (Pasadena, California); Pasadena Star-News Building; George S. Patton residence; A. Kingsley Macomber-Lunkenheimer residence; Hiram Wadsworth residence; Frederick Russell Burnham residence; Hall of Justice

Joseph James Blick (September 20, 1867 – September 5, 1947), sometimes credited as Joseph J. Blick, was an American architect who worked on commercial and residential projects and is best known for diverse residences in Southern California ranging from Mission to Modern styles. Born and raised in Clinton, Iowa, his father James Shannon Blick was a building contractor. The Blick family moved to Pasadena, California in 1887 soon after his sister Blanche married Frederick Russell Burnham, the celebrated scout and long time resident of California. Blick began working in Pasadena as a contractor with his father and in 1889 he apprenticed with T. William Parkes, a member of the Royal Institute of British Architects. In 1891, he married Daisy Russell, a first cousin of Frederick Russell Burnham. After completing his apprenticeship, Blick and Lester S. Moore founded their own architecture firm, Blick & Moore, in Los Angeles in 1895, where he continued to work until his retirement in 1937. Several of his commercial buildings and residences have been listed with the National Register of Historic Places.

== Works ==
=== National Register of Historic Places ===
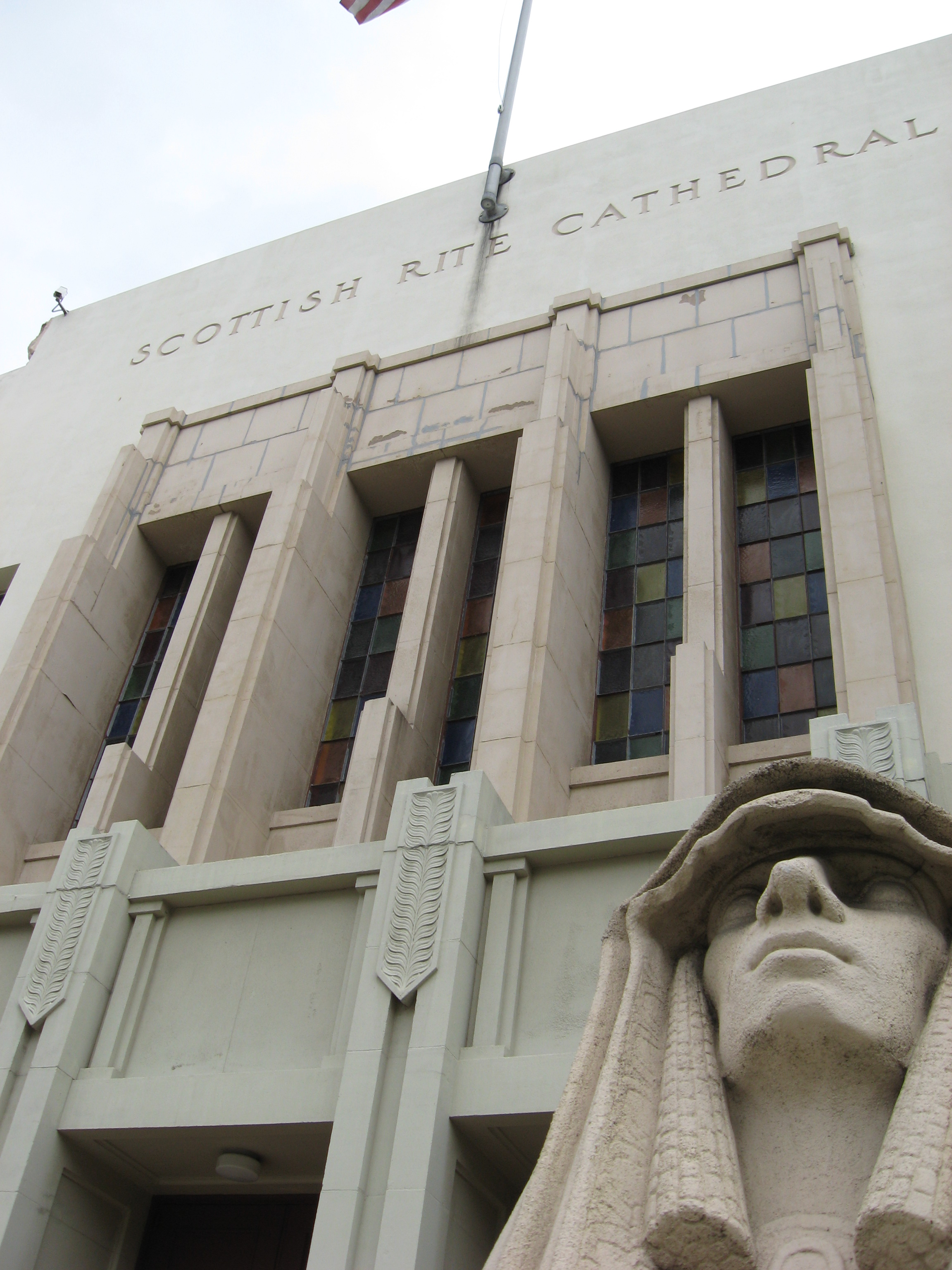
Scottish Rite Cathedral (Pasadena, California).

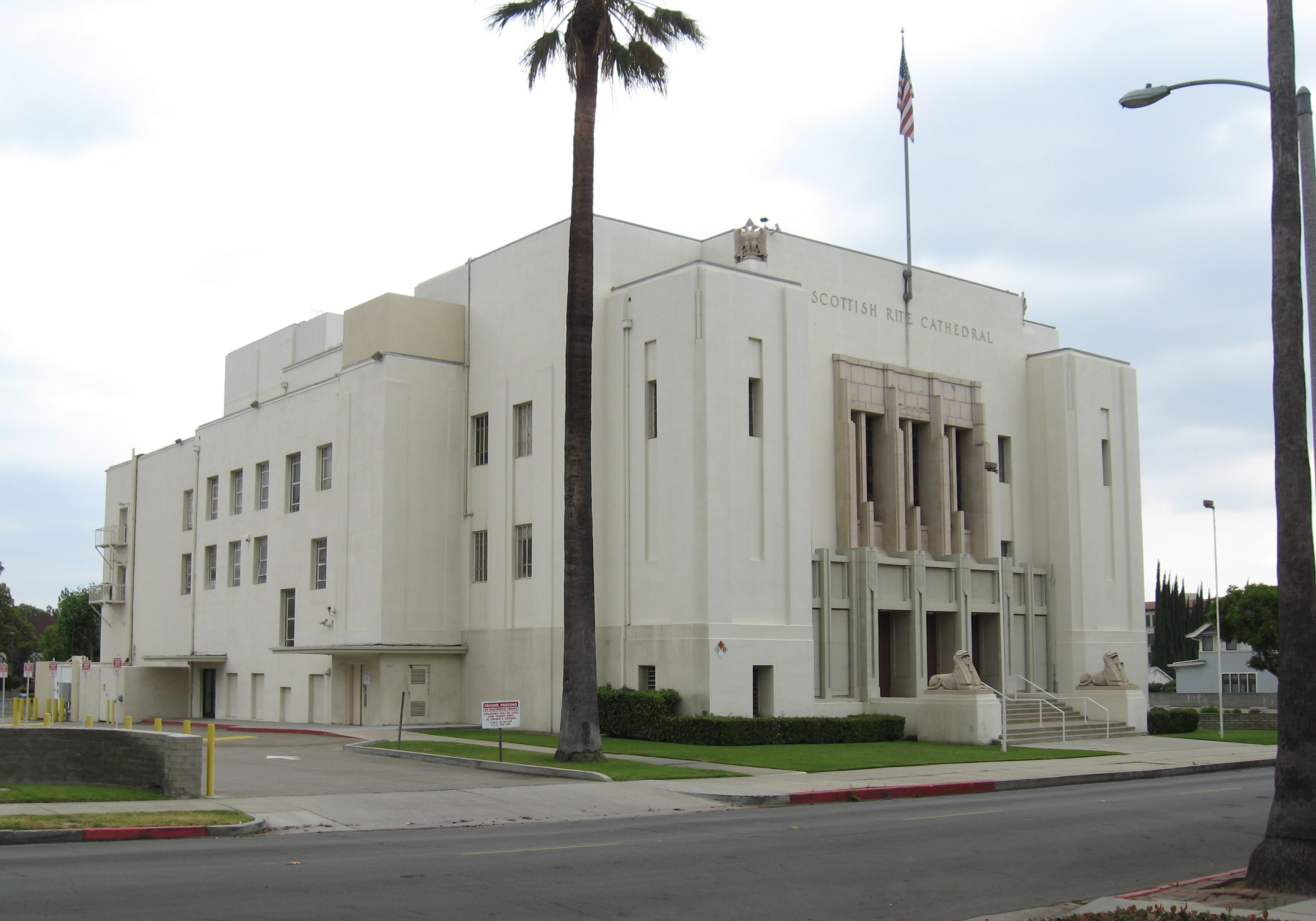
On the National Register of Historic Places.

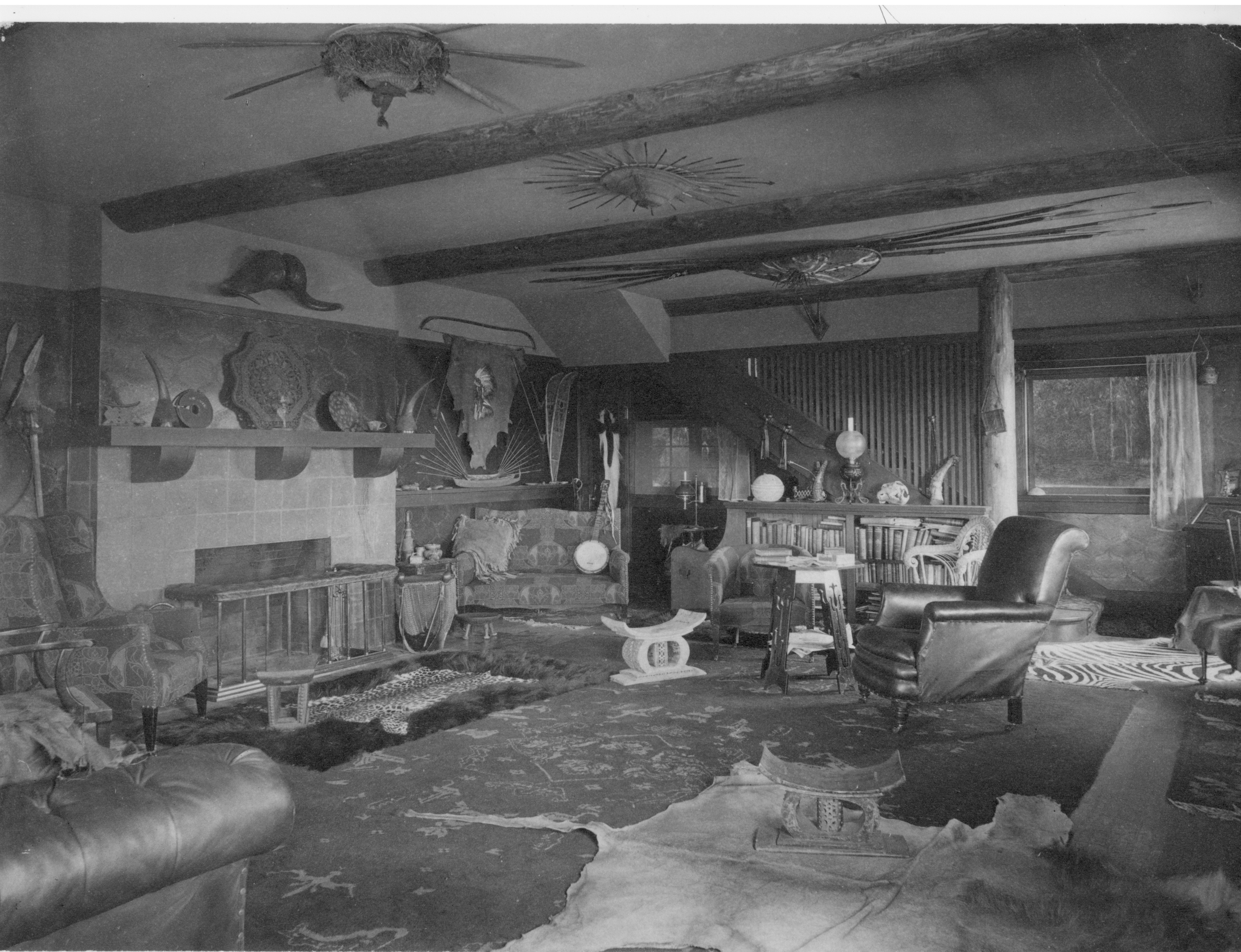
Frederick Russell Burnham residence, 1906

Pasadena Star-News building, Pasadena, California. National Register of Historic Places.

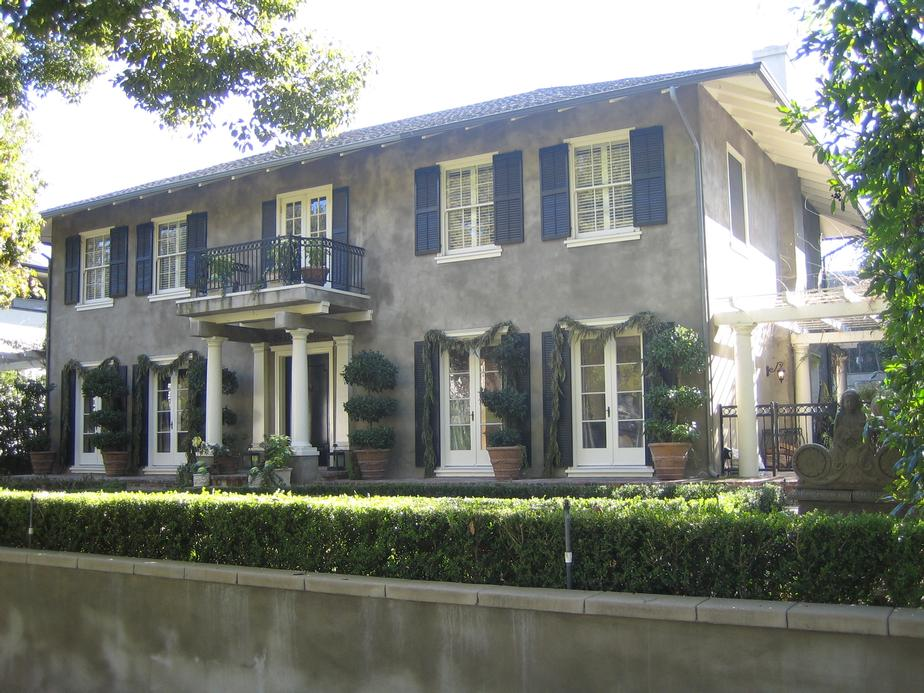
Historic M.H. Reed residence. National Register of Historic Places.

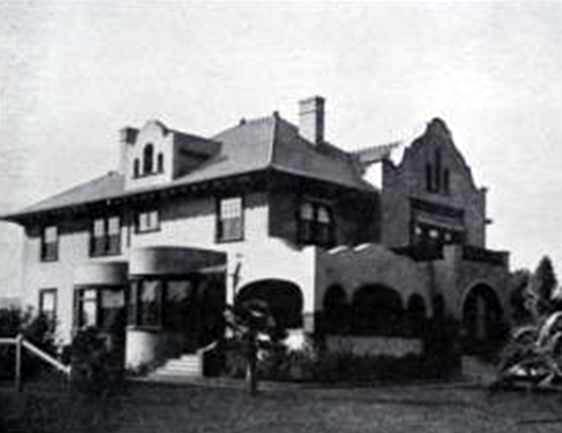
HB Sherman Residence, 1899.

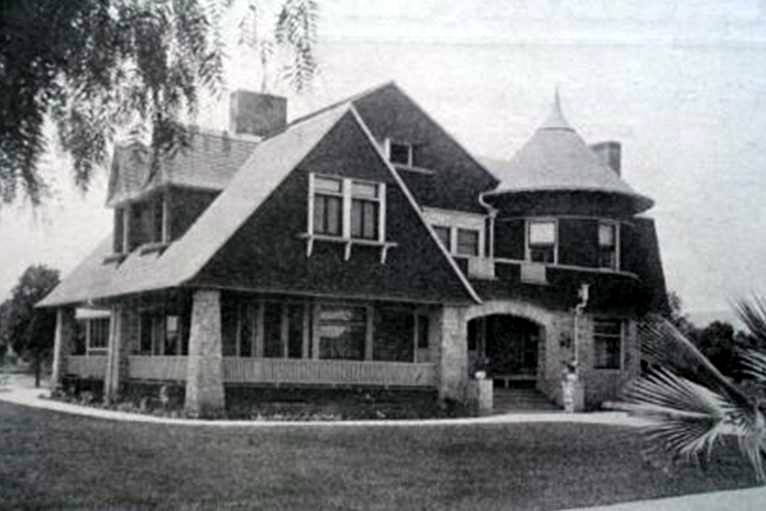
UN Hopkins Residence, 1899.

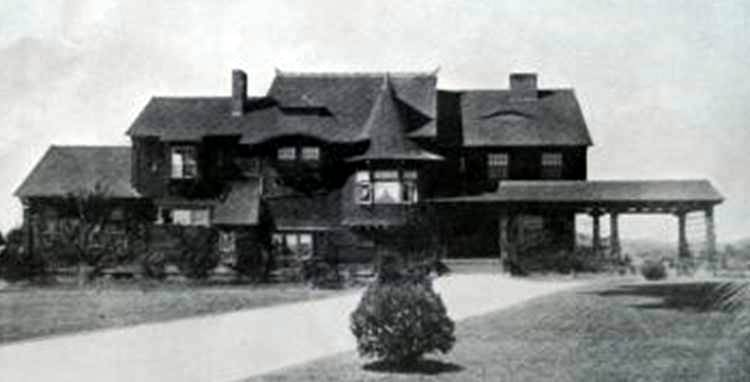
Jason Evans Residence, 1899.

- 268 S. Orange Grove Boulevard (1892)-- Colonial Revival style.
- Henry T. Fuller residence (1894)-- 268 Bellefontaine Street, Pasadena, California. Shingle, English Cottage revival style.
- Residence (1902)--440 La Loma Rd, Pasadena, California. Craftsman (Arts and Crafts) style.
- Adams & Turner Funeral Home (1895)--95-97 N. Raymond, Pasadena, California. Vernacular Masonry style. A two-story stucco-over-brick commercial building with a cut-off corner.
- Benjamin Folsom residence (1903)--445 Bellefontaine Street, Pasadena, California. Folk Victorian style.
- George B. Post residence (1903)--360 South Grand Avenue, Pasadena, California. Arts and Craft interior. Shingle style home features curved walls flanking the row of third floor windows in its front gable.
- Residence (1904)--270 Oakland Avenue, Pasadena, California.
- Residence (1904)--144 N Grand Avenue, Pasadena, California. Craftsman (Arts and Crafts) style.
- Residence (1904)--280 S Grand Avenue, Pasadena, California. Craftsman (Arts and Crafts) style.
- Marie Fisk residence (1906)--510 W. California Blvd, Pasadena, California. Craftsman (Arts and Crafts) style.
- Commercial (1905)-- 60-64 N. Raymond, Pasadena, California. Vernacular Masonry style. A two-story brick commercial building.
- Residence (1905)--556 Prospect Blvd, Pasadena, California.
- Bekins Co Roof Sign, aka, Standard Fireproof Storage Company Roof-top Sign (1906)--511 S. Fair Oaks Avenue, Pasadena, California.
- Residence (1906)--260 S. Orange Grove Boulevard, Pasadena, California. Craftsman, Arts and Crafts period style.
- Residence (1906)--676 S. Madison Avenue, Pasadena, California. Arts and Crafts style.
- Residence (1909)--515 W. California Blvd, Pasadena, California. Craftsman (Arts and Crafts) style.
- Union Building (1911)-- 109-121 E. Union, Pasadena, California. Vernacular Masonry style. Two-story red brick commercial building. Since 1924 the building has been the home of Pasadena Hardware Co., Pasadena's oldest hardware store.
- M.H. Reed residence (1911)--450 Bellefontaine Street, Pasadena, California. Italianate, Arts & Crafts Period.
- Residence (1913)--511 W. California Blvd, Pasadena, California.
- J.C. Brainerd residence (1914)--625 Prospect Blvd, Pasadena, California.
- Engine Company #34, aka, Fire Station 4 (1917)--541 S. Oak Knoll Ave, Pasadena, California. Mediterranean Revival style. Closed in 1989 and rehabilitated as a single family residence in 2000.
- Residence (1920)--540 N Holliston Ave, Pasadena, California. Period Revival Architecture.
- B.F. Thurston residence (1922)--535 Bellefontaine Street, Pasadena, California. Period revival style.
- Scottish Rite Cathedral (1924)--150 N. Madison Ave, Pasadena, California. Streamline Moderne style.
- The Pasadena Star-News building (1924)--525 E. Colorado Blvd, Pasadena, California.
- Commercial (1927)--42 S. De Lacey Avenue, Pasadena, California. Vernacular Masonry style.
- Hall of Justice (1930)--131 E Holly Street, Pasadena, California.

=== Other buildings and residences ===
- Horatio West residence (1897)--412 E. Calaveras St., Altadena
- Robincroft Castle, Col. W.H. Harrison residence (1900)--275 Robincroft Drive, Pasadena, California.
- Joseph J. Blick residence (1901)--275 Madeline Drive, Pasadena, California. The home of Joseph Blick from 1901 until his death in 1947.
- Charles Richardson residence (1903)--397 El Molino Avenue, Pasadena, California.
- Marian M. Brown residence (1903)--515 West California Street, Pasadena, California
- Frederick Russell Burnham residence (1904)--500 South San Rafael avenue, San Rafael Heights, Pasadena, California.
- William C. Baker residence (1904)--341 Palmetto Dr, Pasadena, California. Arts and Crafts period style.
- Residence (1904)--595 South Pasadena Avenue, Pasadena, California.
- Commercial (1904)--24 E. Union, Pasadena, California. Two-room store, single-story brick structure.
- Paul & Maude Honberger residence (1905)--340 S. Madison Avenue, Pasadena, California.
- A. Kingsley Macomber-Lunkenheimer residence (1906)--1215 Wentworth Ave. Oldest house in Oak Knoll–Mission Revival, Arts & Crafts period style.
- Henderson residence (1906)--795 Oak Knoll Circle, Pasadena, California.
- Residence (1907)--555 S Grand Avenue, Pasadena, California. Arts and Crafts style.
- Residence (1908)--919 N. Raymond Avenue, Pasadena, California.
- Holloway Stuart residence (1910)--875 La Loma Rd, Pasadena, California. Arts and Crafts period style.
- Fire Station 5 (1909)-- 900 S. Pasadena Avenue, Pasadena, California. Now a residence.
- Newcomb House, "El Roble" (1910)-- Craftsman style.
- George S. Patton residence (1910)--1220 Patton Ct., San Marino
- Commercial (1910)--39 Mills Place, Pasadena, California. A grouping of three single-story painted brick buildings constructed separately and now joined.
- Albert H. Gates residence (1911)--499 Monterey Road, Pasadena, California. Tudor-Craftsman chalet with Mission touches style.
- V.E. Sweazy residence (1911)--895 S. Madison Avenue, Pasadena, California. Arts and Crafts period style.
- Gates Family Estate, residence (1911)--1209 Indiana Ave, South Pasadena, California
- Residence (1911)--1215 Indiana Ave, South Pasadena, California
- Hiram Wadsworth residence (1912)--1090 Rubio St., Altadena, California. Wadsworth became the first mayor of Pasadena and this home was used in the films Risky Business, How Stella Got Her Groove Back, The Baby-Sitters Club, Can't Hardly Wait, and the pilot for TV series 7th Heaven.
- Residence (1912)--222 S Grand Avenue, Pasadena, California. Arts and Crafts style.
- Residence (1913)--630 Hillside Ter, Pasadena, California.
- Residence (1913)--435 N. Raymond Avenue, Pasadena, California.
- Residence (1913)--685 Oak Knoll Cir, Pasadena, California. Arts and Crafts period style.
- Residence (1913) 1133 Buena Vista Street, South Pasadena
- Residence (1913)--203 Bellefontaine Street, Pasadena, California.
- Charles H. and Mabel Prisk residence (1922)-- 1425 Hillcrest Avenue, Oak Knoll, Pasadena, California.
- Frederick Russell Burnham residence (1923)--Hollywood, California
- Residence (1930)--610 Lechner Place, Hollywood, California. English-Tutor style.
- Pasadena city jail (1930)--Pasadena, California.
- Frederick Russell Burnham residence (1936)--3579 Griffith Park Blvd, Los Angeles, California.
- Residence (1937)-- 210 Woodruff Ave, Los Angeles, California

== Bibliography ==
Blick authored the following works:

- Blick, Joseph J.; Leonard Abbott (1907). Pasadena Homes. Pasadena, California. OCLC 19102412.

== Notes ==
Source notes
