= William C. Crowell =

American architect and builder

William C. Crowell (1871–1951) was an American architect and builder.

Buildings which he designed or built include:

- Scottish Rite Cathedral (Pasadena, California), built in 1925
- Kindel Building, 1095 E. Colorado Blvd., Pasadena, California, built in 1928, and listed on the National Register of Historic Places
- The Atheneum and many other buildings on the Caltech campus
- Huntington Library

Crowell was born in 1871 near Argyle, Nova Scotia, Canada. He studied architecture in Seattle, Washington.

== Career ==
In 1894, Crowell became a carpenter in Pasadena, California.

Crowell opened and ran the William C. Crowell Company in Pasadena, California, from 1897 to 1939, at which date he turned operation over to one of his sons.

== Personal life ==
Crowell married Iva Grace Nickerson of Nova Scotia in 1899, and they had eight children.

In 1931, Crowell built his French Period Revival home in San Marino, California.It was designed by architect Thomas Mulvin.
