= Marshall Kent (actor) =

American actor (1908–1985)

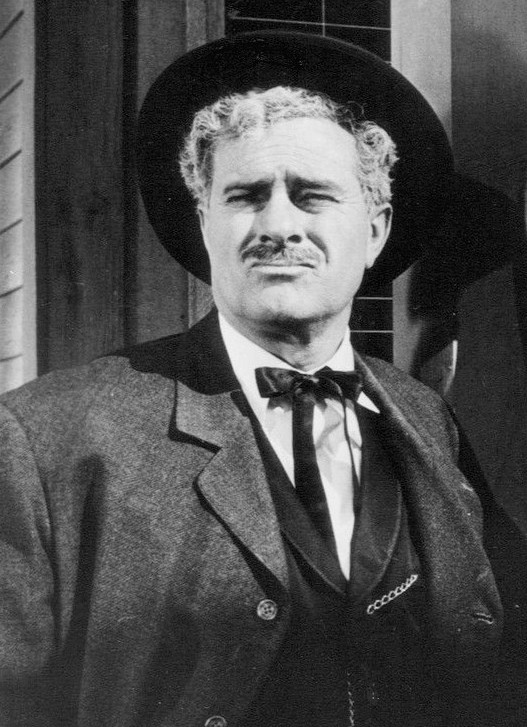
- Kent in Maverick (1958)
- Born: October 6, 1908; Lamar County, Texas, U.S.
- Died: January 15, 1985 (aged 76); Los Angeles, California, U.S.
- Occupation: Actor
- Years active: 1956–1977

Marshall Kent (October 6, 1908 – January 15, 1985) was an American television and film actor who appeared in 30 television series or films between 1956 and 1977. He was best known for his role as "Doc" in the 1958 spoof of Gunsmoke presented as an episode of Maverick starring James Garner entitled "Gun-Shy."

== Career ==
Kent appeared in various other television series including Dragnet with Jack Webb, Perry Mason with Raymond Burr, The Deputy with Henry Fonda, The Gray Ghost with Broderick Crawford, Dennis the Menace with Robert Young, Room 222, The Wonderful World of Disney and Little House on the Prairie. He was also a supporting player in films including The Decks Ran Red with James Mason and Dorothy Dandridge, Ring of Fire with David Janssen, and The Last Voyage with Robert Stack and Dorothy Malone.

== Filmography ==
=== Film ===
Year	Title	Role	Notes
1957	Teenage Thunder	Mr. Palmer	
1958	The Decks Ran Red	Sammy	
1959	-30-	Mr. Jason	
1960	The Last Voyage	Quartermaster	
1960	The Last Voyage	Quartermaster	
1961	Ring of Fire	Deputy	
1970	Beyond the Valley of the Dolls	Dr. Downs	

=== Television ===
Year	Title	Role	Notes
1956	Navy Log	Admiral	1 episode
1957	General Electric Theater		1 episode
1957	Panic! (TV series)	Circus Exhibitor	1 episode
1957	The Gray Ghost		1 episode
1958	Highway Patrol	Jimmy Withers	1 episode
1959	Maverick	Doc Stucke	1 episode
1958-1959	Dragnet		2 episodes
1959	Pete Kelly's Blues	Doc Stucke fact	1 episode
1959	The Millionaire	Doctor	1 episode
1960	The Deputy	Guest	1 episode
1960	Alcoa Theatre	Mr. Stacey	1 episode
1960	The Loretta Young Show	Mr. Wycoff	1 episode
1960	The Man and the Challenge	Pentagon Chief	1 episode
1961	Lock-Up	Ralph Trindle	1 episode
1961	Shannon	Frank Latham	1 episode
1961	Window on Main Street	Mr. Palmer	1 episode
1961	Dennis the Menace	Wilbur	1 episode
1962-1966	Perry Mason	Ed Thomas / Man	2 episodes
1965	The Third Man		1 episode
1969	The Doris Day Show	Elderly Man at Market	1 episode
1970	The Good Guys	Customer #1	1 episode
1974	The Wonderful World of Disney	City Engineer	2 episodes
1977	Little House on the Prairie	Dr. Quimby	1 episode
