= Multiple Toymakers =

American toy company

Multiple Toymakers was an American toy company. They were one of the first toy companies to license the use of DC Comics' Superman, producing a Superman-shaped water gun in 1967.

== History ==
Multiple Toymakers, originally founded as Multiple Products Corporation (MPC) around 1950, began its operations in postwar New York City as a producer of plastic toy figures. By the mid-1950s, the company had expanded its range of offerings to include army men, "ring hand" figures featuring pirates, farmers, and various historical subjects, and accessories and vehicles.

Facing financial pressures and increased competition, MPC underwent significant ownership changes beginning in the mid-1960s. In 1965, the company was sold to Loral Corporation, an aerospace manufacturer, and operated under the name "Multiple Products Co., a Division of the Loral Corporation." However, Loral quickly divested from the toy industry, and by 1967, MPC was acquired by Miner Industries, at which point packaging transitioned to "Multiple Products Corp, a Division of Miner Industries" and the name "Multiple Toymakers" became more prominent, eventually replacing the original branding.

Miner Industries encountered financial difficulties and declared bankruptcy in 1979, subsequently emerging with a new partnership under Toy Major. Multiple Toymakers' operations dwindled through the early 1980s, and the company ultimately ceased production around 1984-1985. Many of its original molds were later acquired by other firms.
