= Arabian Knights =

- Title card
- Genre: Fantasy
- Directed by: Joseph Barbera; William Hanna
- Voices of: Henry Corden; Paul Frees; Frank Gerstle; Shari Lewis; Don Messick; Jay North; John Stephenson
- Country of origin: United States
- Original languages: English; French
- No. of seasons: 1
- No. of episodes: 18

Production
- Production company: Hanna-Barbera Productions

Original release
- Network: NBC
- Release: September 7, 1968 – January 4, 1969

Arabian Knights is an animated segment of The Banana Splits Adventure Hour, created by Hanna-Barbera Productions. Its setting is very loosely based on the Arabian Nights, a classic work of Middle Eastern literature. The cast includes Jay North, Shari Lewis, Henry Corden, Paul Frees, Frank Gerstle, and John Stephenson.

== Plot: Secret origins ==
Once a peaceful country, Persia was overrun by the powerful forces of the evil conqueror Bakaar the Black Sultan. When all the states of Persia were overthrown, Bakaar invaded the capital city of Baghdad. Bakaar and his forces breached the royal palace and forcibly claimed the throne from Prince Turhan and ordered the prince to be killed.

Prince Turhan fled the palace, pursued by the guards of Bakaar. In his escape, the prince is helped by a magician named Fariik who with his magic slipped away from the guards. On their way to the state of El-Rabaul to seek aid from his uncle the Caliph, Turhan and Fariik meet Raseem the Strong while being chased by the guards in the Caves of Doom. Raseem tells them that Bakaar's forces have already usurped the throne of El-Rabaul and imprisoned the Caliph and his daughter Princess Nida. The trio then heads to El-Rabaul on Raseem's donkey Zazuum.

In El-Rabaul, they rescue Princess Nida who is about to be sold into slavery. There, Princess Nida demonstrates her mastery of disguise and voice mimicry by tricking the guards, but they soon find themselves cornered by Bakaar's men. There Bez the Beast, a shapeshifter, jumps into the scene, changes into an elephant, charges through the guards, and carries everyone to safety. In the Caves of Doom, they decide to form a heroic band and swear to protect their land from the tyranny of Bakaar, thus forming an alliance called the Arabian Knights.

== Series direction ==
Arabian Knights was one of several animated miniseries used as filler segments for Hanna-Barbera's Banana Splits Adventure Hour show. Each episode ran between 9 and 10 minutes in length. For the most part, it competed with the other series, namely the animated The Three Musketeers, the part live action, part animated Micro Ventures, and the live action Danger Island segments.

The Arabian Knights adventures often involve the Knights trying to effect some action against Bakaar's soldiers, finding a means to further complete their goal of turning the tables on the evil dictator. They may also deal with another villain set within the Knights' universe.

The adventures have a semi-serious slant, with a good portion of action and comedy mixed in. Hardly anyone is injured or harmed, save for Bakaar's minions (with a usually comic effect), and the episodes usually have an upbeat, happy ending for the Knights.

== Characters ==
=== The Arabian Knights ===
- Prince Turhan (voiced by Jay North) – The prince of Baghdad and rightful heir to the throne of the Sultan, Turhan is a young and handsome teenage boy. Apart from being brave and bold, he is an agile acrobat, an athlete, and a master swordsman. Turhan gathers a small group of friends to lead a revolt against the tyranny of Bakaar and reclaim his throne to restore the peace and prosperity in his state. Turhan is the de facto leader of the Knights and the driving force behind fighting Bakaar and ending the usurper's reign. He owns a magic scimitar that can be thrown and returns like a boomerang, in unique ways. It is speculated he was a prototype for Scooby Doo's Fred Jones.
- Princess Nida (voiced by Shari Lewis) – Daughter of the Caliph of El-Rabaul, Princess Nida is a beautiful teenage girl who is the cousin of Prince Turhan. She is a master of disguise and an expert of voice mimicry. Nida is also skilled in martial arts and can hold her own in the Knights' battles.
- Fariik the Magician (voiced by John Stephenson) – A short, tubby, jolly little man, Fariik is a skilled practitioner and spell-master of the mystical arts who lends a magical hand when needed. To cast his spell, Fariik would say his magic words, "Rosan Kobar." He has done variations of that incantation, such as “Rosan Korkapukus” to conjure corks plugging the ears of guards. He is the first to have offered aid to Turhan after Prince Turhan is deposed by Bakaar. Sometimes, the magic gets very difficult and can take a lot of energy out of him. Fariik can animate carpets and pillows for the occasional airborne transport of the team. Fariik can render himself and others invisible for stealth or camouflage purposes. At times, he can dissolve himself and others into smoke to make an escape from narrow places. He can levitate objects, alter the size of things and persons, create things out of thin air, and alter the form of one thing into another.
- Raseem the Strong (voiced by Frank Gerstle) – A tall muscular man with brief costume and fez, Raseem is the powerhouse of the team with incredible physical strength, endurance, and stamina. He first met Turhan and Fariik when they hid in the Caves of Doom that he occupies. Raseem mistakes them for Bakaar's men and attacks them. However, upon learning they are against Bakaar, he befriends them, and he goes with them to find the Caliph (to get his aid against Bakaar). He often boasts of his strength, saying he is as strong as 30 men. At one time, Raseem said he was as strong as seven elephants. Strong enough to shatter stone walls, lift and catch boulders, catch and throw back cannonballs, and fight off scores of Bakaar's soldiers at a time, Raseem's power makes for a good equalizer in the Knights' battles. He is very similar to the portrayal of Porthos from the other Banana Splits cartoon The Three Musketeers, both are characterised as being inhumanly strong and have deep booming voices.
- Zazuum (voiced by Don Messick, originally incorrectly attributed to Paul Frees) – Raseem's faithful little donkey with long ears, Zazuum was first used by Turhan, Fariik, and Raheem to get to El-Rabaul. Zazuum is quite an intelligent donkey as he aids his fellow team members. Zazuum can spin himself so fast he becomes like a destructive miniature tornado that can defeat any enemy or destroy anything coming his way. He does not like his tail to be pulled, as it enrages him to the point of being a berserk loose cannon that can shatter rocks into pebbles. In addition, Zazuum can smell gold with great sensitivity.
- Bez the Beast (voiced by Henry Corden) – A dark-skinned man with a turban and green clothing, Bez can shapeshift into any animal, bird, or aquatic creature, from a mighty elephant to a tiny mouse. Often, he triggers this ability by speaking the phrase “Size of a —!” and naming the animal or bird he wishes to turn into, followed by a loud boom that proclaims his transformation. Sometimes the magical phrase is followed by clapping his hands together. If the creature is small enough, Bez can turn into many versions of it such as turning into a million bees. Bez is known to turn into some larger animals which often serve as alternate modes of transportation for the Arabian Knights, like an elephant or a camel for land transportation. He can also transform into mythical creatures like a winged stallion or a roc for the occasional airborne transportation. His shapeshifting makes him a handy spy for the Knights in order to find out what Bakaar is planning.

=== Villains ===
- Bakaar the Black Sultan (voiced by John Stephenson) – The corrupt conqueror and nemesis of the Arabian Knights, Bakaar usurps the throne of Turhan's father and takes control of Baghdad. Clearly wishing to command all of the kingdoms that bow to Baghdad, he sets all of his forces to the goal of capturing Turhan (and later all of the Knights) to secure his place on the throne. While cruel, Bakaar does not usually involve himself directly in the fight against the Knights. He prefers to let his soldiers and minions to do the job. Bakaar's distinctive manner of dress—a single-spiked, fur-lined helmet in place of a crown—hints at ancestry from the Mongols.
  - Vangore (voiced by Paul Frees) – Bakaar's enforcer and captain of his guards. Often hatches plots to capture the Knights. Apparently, Vangore's father was a camel driver. He has red hair shaved to a topknot (which would historically be an indication of Galatian ancestry and of being enslaved).
  - Sundar – Bakaar's court magician.

== Episodes ==
Nº	Title	Original release date
1	"Joining of the Knights"	September 7, 1968
Joining Of The Knights tells the secret origins of Bakaar's invasion of Baghdad and how the Arabian Knights came into hiding.
2	"The Ransom"	September 14, 1968
After saving Prince Raji (Dick Beals) from the minions of Bakaar, the Arabian Knights go to help his father the Caliph of al-ʻArish who is being held captive for ransom. Vangore takes the Caliph to Baghdad just as the Arabian Knights attack his camp.
3	"A Trap for Turhan"	September 21, 1968
Vangore tricks Raseem and captures him to set a trap to lure Prince Turhan and his friends to rescue Raseem and fall into Bakaar's evil scheme: a public execution of the Arabian Knights as enemies of the state.
4	"The Great Gold Robbery"	September 28, 1968
Bakaar frames the Arabian Knights for the gold robbery from the local treasury to lure them into a deadly trap awaiting them.
5	"The Wizard Ramnizar"	October 5, 1968
Bakaar hires an evil wizard named Ramnizar to wipe out the Arabian Knights from the face of the Earth.
6	"Sky Raiders of the Desert"	October 12, 1968
Nida is kidnapped by raiders on flying horses. The Arabian Knights are attacked by giant bats, but they fight them off and manage to infiltrate the Sky Raiders' fortress.
7	"The Challenge"	October 19, 1968
When Bez brings news of Bakaar holding a contest for the strongest man, Raseem cannot help but take the bait, getting him and Turhan captured. The Arabian Knights stealthily infiltrate the camp and deliver to Bakaar a humiliating loss.
8	"Isle of Treachery"	October 26, 1968
Vangore captures Queen Shaheera and her son Ahmed to lure the Arabian Knights into a trap. Raseem and Bez quietly dispose of the guards to free the others and drive Vangore and his forces away from the palace.
9	"The Sultan's Plot"	November 2, 1968
Abaddon, the Sultan of Darkness, takes away the city of Kilibad from its Caliph for denying him tribute. Abaddon then has the Arabian Knights trapped in his darkened kingdom. Using a donkey trick, the Arabian Knights cast sunlight on Abaddon's amulet, rendering his power useless.
10	"The Reluctant Empress"	November 9, 1968
The ruler Shiraz has the means to take Nida to make her his empress by force, but she puts up an active resistance to his seduction with a heroic spirit. The Arabian Knights follow her to the city of Abadon and battle Shiraz and his men.
11	"The Coronation of Bakaar"	November 16, 1968
Vangore steals the crown of Araby for Bakaar. The Arabian Knights must reclaim the crown before the coronation ceremony takes place.
12	"The Great Brass Beast"	November 23, 1968
Vangore is intent on destroying Jiwara with a brass war machine in the form of a war elephant. The war machine seems to be unstoppable for the Arabian Knights.
13	"The Fabulous Fair"	November 30, 1968
The Arabian Knights go undercover to Bakaar's town fair. Each event the Arabian Knights win incites more rebellious murmurings against Bakaar, especially the horse race where Zazuum poses as an Arabian zebra for a disguised Nida to ride on.
14	"The Desert Pirates"	December 7, 1968
Vangore overpowers and captures Nida and Raseem with his land pirate ship. The remaining Arabian Knights mislead Vangore to Nazir to ambush him.
15	"The Jewels of Joowar"	December 14, 1968
Vangore has ransacked Joowar and stolen its magical jewels. Turhan and Raseem are caught trying to retrieve the jewels, but the other Arabian Knights release them and proceed to fight off Vangore.
16	"The Spy"	December 21, 1968
The Arabian Knights foil Vangore's plunder, but not without losing Zazuum to him. Bakaar's court magician Sundar impersonates Zazuum to find the Arabian Knights' hideout. Sundar's disguise does not go unnoticed and the Arabian Knights repel Bakaar's attack while Zazuum returns.
17	"The Prisoner"	December 28, 1968
With Vangore out to kidnap Princess Tasmin, Nida takes her place, getting herself and Zazuum captured. They both escape and with the rest of the Arabian Knights, fight off Bakaar's guards and briefly take Bakaar prisoner.
18	"The Royal Visitor"	January 4, 1969
Prince Kamal visits Baghdad unaware that it is under Bakaar's rule. He gets trapped in a pyramid which the abilities of Raseem and Bez have no effect on. Fariik provides the access to enter the pyramid. After going through the labyrinth and rescuing the prince, everyone escapes the pyramid.

== Home media ==
The first episode, "Joining of the Knights", was released on the DVDs Saturday Morning Cartoons 1970s Vol. 2 and Saturday Morning Cartoons: 1960s-1980s Collection.
