= Ronne Troup =

American actress and educator

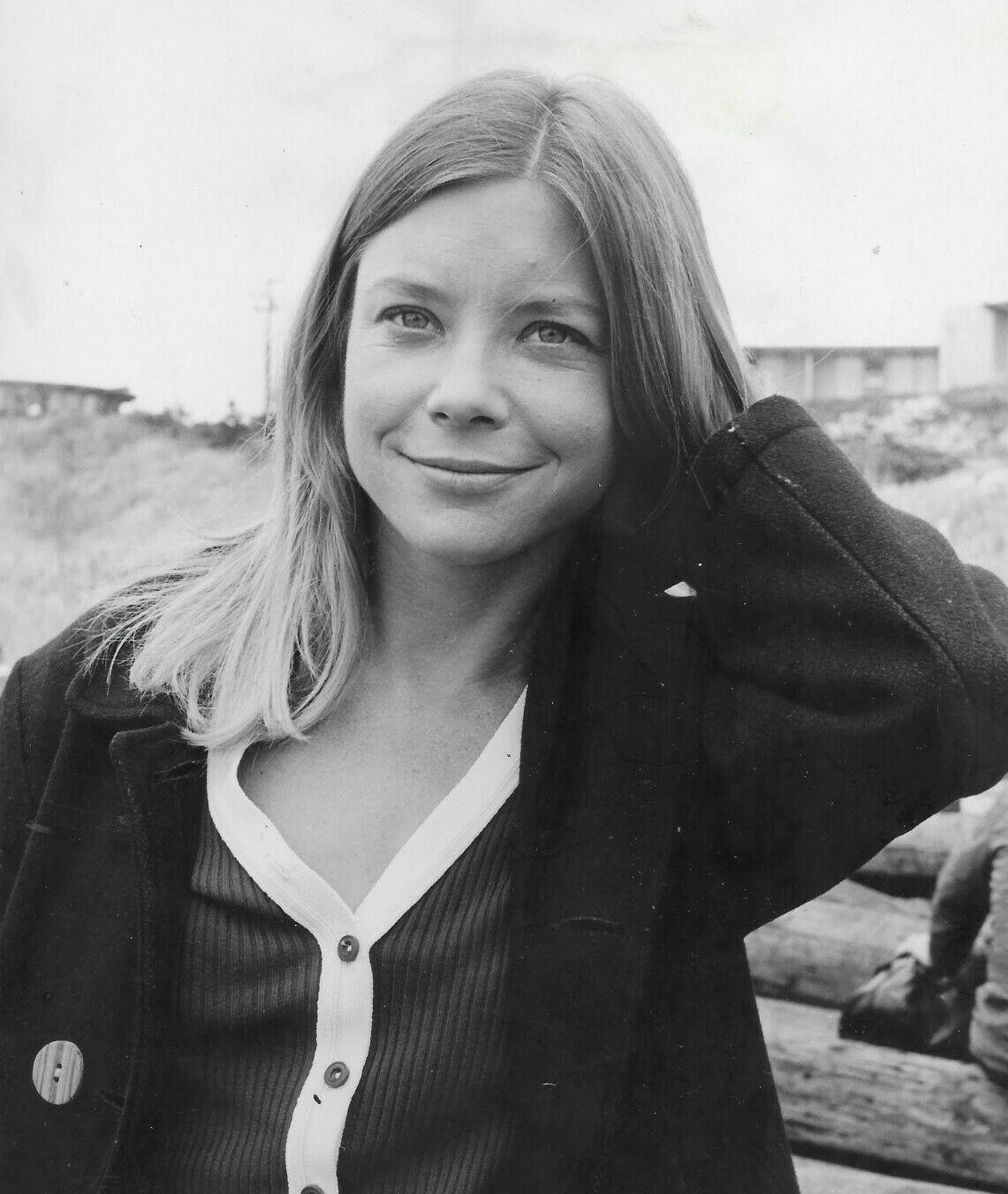
- Ronne Troup in a publicity photo in 1974
- Occupation: Actress
- Years active: 1964–2010
- Television: My Three Sons
- Spouse: Bob Bayles
- Children: 2
- Father: Bobby Troup

Ronne Troup is an American actress and educator whose acting roles include Pauline "Polly" Williams Douglas on the sitcom My Three Sons.

== Biography ==
Troup is the daughter of musician and actor Bobby Troup, and his first wife, Cynthia Hare, and the stepdaughter of actress/singer Julie London. She attended North Hollywood High School and is a graduate of UCLA, where she studied English and elementary education.

Troup's current husband is Bob Bayles.

== Career ==
In 1964, Troup was working as a television background extra appearing (uncredited) in some fourth-season black-and-white episodes of My Three Sons in classroom scenes featuring co-star Don Grady. She later worked as an uncredited extra in classroom scenes on Gidget (1965).

She appeared, uncredited, as a club patron in the James Darren film For Those Who Think Young (1964). She appeared, in another uncredited role, as a teen party guest in the Bob Hope film I'll Take Sweden (1965). In 1966, she made her film debut as part of the all-girl ensemble in Columbia Films' The Trouble with Angels, where she is prominent in the graduation scene. In December 1966 (at age 21), she was cast as Sister Bertrille and had begun filming the pilot for The Flying Nun when she was dropped after the studio's first choice, Sally Field, finally agreed to accept the role.

In 1968, she played the role of Leslie Hayden in Danger Island, the cliffhanger serial that was featured on the Banana Splits Adventure Hour children's program on Saturday mornings.

She appeared on Family Affair in 1970 in the episode "Desert Isle: Manhattan Style". She was subsequently offered the role of Polly Williams Douglas, wife of Chip Douglas on My Three Sons, a role she played for two years (1970–72). In the Season 4 episode of The Partridge Family entitled "Hate Thy Neighbor" (1973), she appeared as Donna Stevens, the daughter of the new family who move next door to the Partridges.

She then appeared often on popular dramas Emergency! (in which her stepmother and father co-starred), Marcus Welby, M.D., The Rookies ( 1972 series), Cannon, S.W.A.T. and Adam-12 (3/18/1975). From 1987 to 1990, she portrayed "Barbara" on the CBS show Knots Landing. In more recent years, Troup has appeared in guest roles on Strong Medicine, The West Wing, and Cold Case.

On June 19, 2010, Troup appeared with her My Three Sons co-stars at a 50th anniversary celebration of the classic series at the Paley Center for Media in Beverly Hills.

Troup's acting experience included making commercials. Among the products that she promoted were Kool-Aid, cheese-filled Combos, and Aim toothpaste. She often made commercials while her children were in school and said, "My kids don't even know I'm working."
