= Frank Gerstle =

American actor (1915–1970)

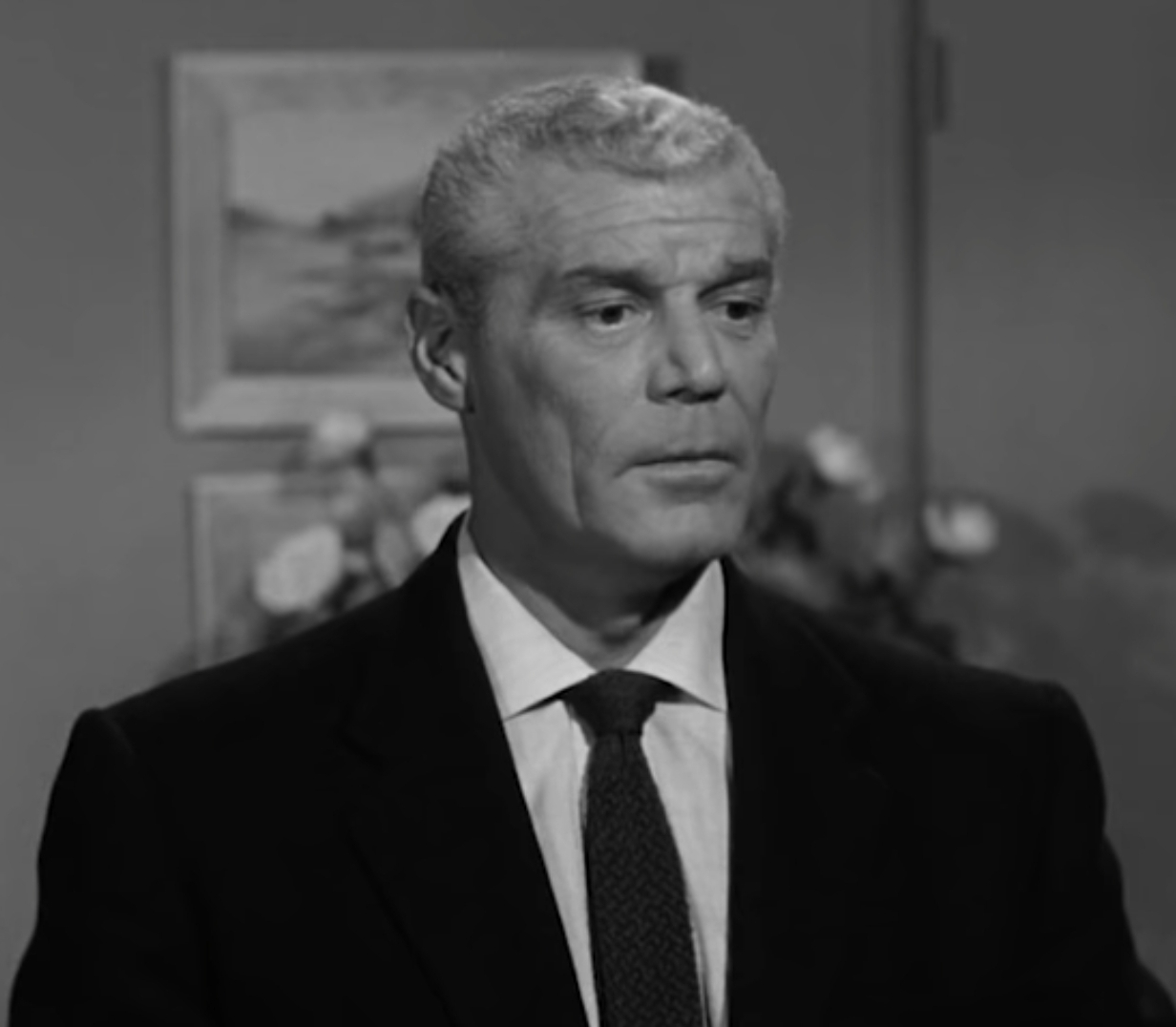
- Gerstle in The Wasp Woman (1959)
- Born: Francis M. Gerstle; September 27, 1915
- Died: February 23, 1970 (aged 54); Santa Monica, California, U.S.
- Occupation: Actor
- Years active: 1943–1970

Francis M. Gerstle (September 27, 1915 – February 23, 1970) was an American character actor who appeared in supporting roles in numerous films, radio programs and TV shows following World War II.

== Biography ==
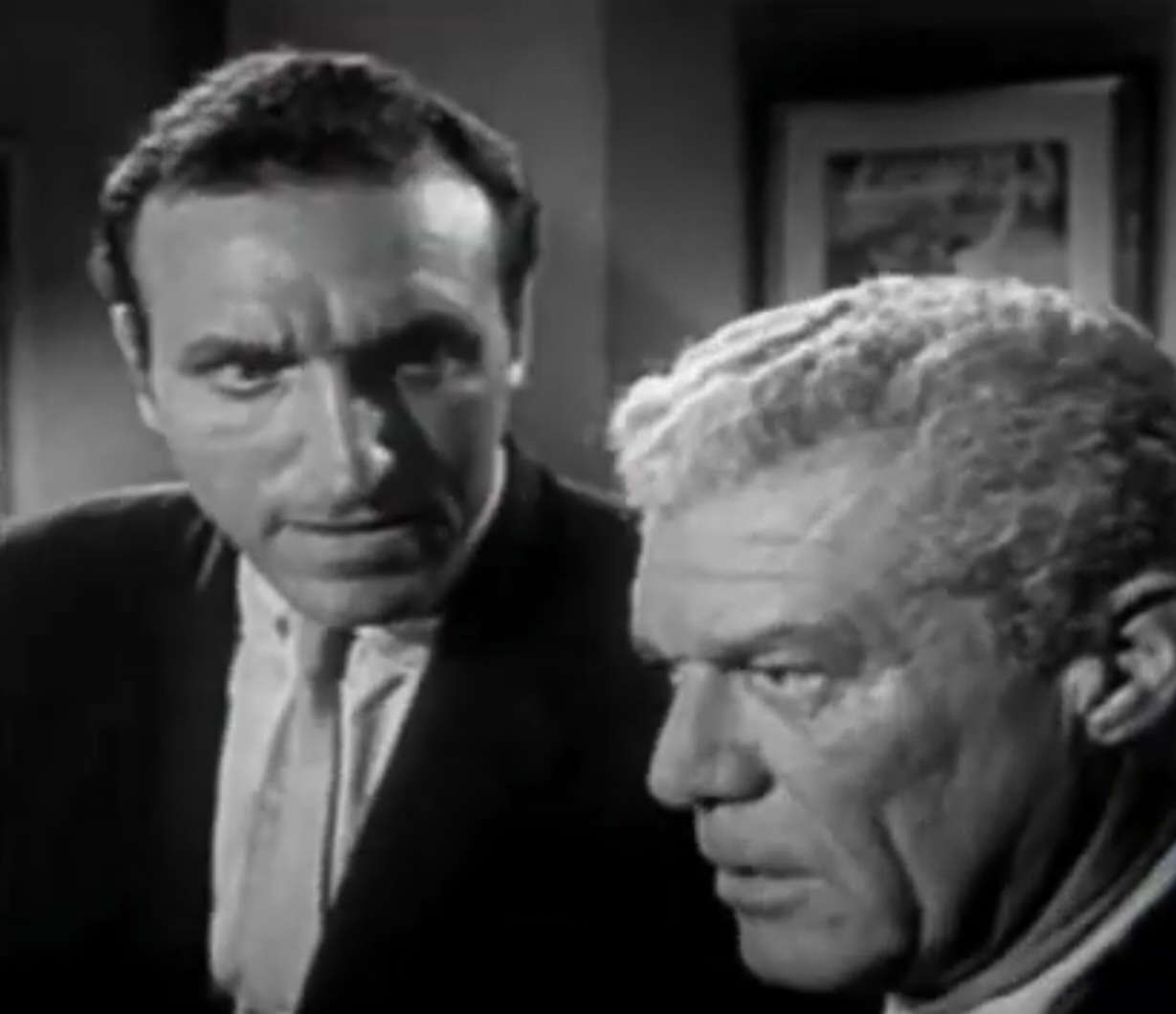
Len Lesser and Frank Gerstle in the television series Lock-Up, episode "The Seventh Hour" (1960)

Gerstle's notable appearances included Outside the Wall. In television, he portrayed Saloon Owner Ganly on The Life and Legend of Wyatt Earp, in an episode known as A Good Man. His final appearance was in the episode San Francisco International in San Francisco International Airport which aired on September 29, 1970.

== Death ==
Gerstle died of cancer in Santa Monica, California on February 23, 1970, at age 54.

== Filmography ==
=== Film ===
- D.O.A. (1949) - Dr. MacDonald
- Outside the Wall (1950) - Stick-Up Man (uncredited)
- My Friend Irma Goes West (1950) - Doctor (uncredited)
- The Next Voice You Hear... (1950) - Plant Worker in Locker Room (uncredited)
- A Life of Her Own (1950) - Birthday Party Guest (uncredited)
- Three Guys Named Mike (1951) - Joe Allison, Radio Dispatcher (uncredited)
- I Was a Communist for the FBI (1951) - Tom Cvetic (uncredited)
- Strictly Dishonorable (1951) - Charlie, Dempsey's Photographer (uncredited)
- Little Egypt (1951) - Globe Reporter (uncredited)
- You Can Never Tell (1951) - Detective
- The Blue Veil (1951) - Doctor (uncredited)
- The Unknown Man (1951) - News Photographer in Bucknor's Office (uncredited)
- Young Man with Ideas (1952) - Bill Collector (uncredited)
- Blackhawk: Fearless Champion of Freedom (1952, Serial) - Dawson, New Fuel Demonstrator [Chs. 7-8] (uncredited)
- The Bad and the Beautiful (1952) - Gabby Agent at Party (uncredited)
- Above and Beyond (1952) - Staff Sergeant Wilson (uncredited)
- The Magnetic Monster (1953) - Colonel Willis
- Call Me Madam (1953) - Newspaper Reporter (uncredited)
- The Lady Wants Mink (1953) - Frank, Office Worker (uncredited)
- The Glory Brigade (1953) - Major Sauer (uncredited)
- The Neanderthal Man (1953) - Mr. Wheeler, Hunter
- Vicki (1953) - Detective (uncredited)
- Killers from Space (1954) - Dr. Curt Kruger
- The Long, Long Trailer (1954) - Gas Station Attendant (uncredited)
- Drum Beat (1954) - Grant's Officer (uncredited)
- Tight Spot (1955) - Jim Hornsby (uncredited)
- I Cover the Underworld (1955) - Dum-Dum Wilson
- 5 Against the House (1955) - Robbery Suspect (uncredited)
- It's Always Fair Weather (1955) - Mug (uncredited)
- The McConnell Story (1955) - American Soldier in Korea (uncredited)
- Slightly Scarlet (1956) - Detective Lieutenant Dave Dietz (uncredited)
- The Killer Is Loose (1956) - Holdup Man (uncredited)
- The Steel Jungle (1956) - Kadinski
- The Proud Ones (1956) - Tim (uncredited)
- Autumn Leaves (1956) - Ramsey
- Magnificent Roughnecks (1956) - Chuck Evans
- Between Heaven and Hell (1956) - Colonel Miles (uncredited)
- Top Secret Affair (1957) - Sergeant Kruger
- The River's Edge (1957) - Harry Castleton
- Under Fire (1957) - Colonel Dundee
- No Down Payment (1957) - Verdun (uncredited)
- Ambush at Cimarron Pass (1958) - Captain Sam Prescott
- Onionhead (1958) - Officer at Inquiry (uncredited)
- Submarine Seahawk (1958) - Captain Boardman
- I Mobster (1959) - District Attorney
- Inside the Mafia (1959) - Julie, the killer
- The Wasp Woman (1959) - Les Hellman
- The Four Skulls of Jonathan Drake (1959) - Lee Coulter
- Beloved Infidel (1959) - Frank, Reporter (uncredited)
- Vice Raid (1959) - Captain William Brennan
- Hell to Eternity (1960) - Drunken Officer (uncredited)
- The Andy Griffith Show (1960) S1, E2, Tursley, a prison escapee
- A Thunder of Drums (1961) - Trooper Drortmander (uncredited)
- The Nun and the Sergeant (1962) - Sergeant in Charge of the Brig
- 13 West Street (1962) - Mr. Johnson
- Kid Galahad (1962) - Romero's Manager (uncredited)
- Shock Corridor (1963) - Lieutenant Kane
- Monstrosity (1963) - Dr. Frank
- The Quick Gun (1964) - George Keely
- Young Dillinger (1965) - Watchman
- Marriage on the Rocks (1965) - Assistant (uncredited)
- The Silencers (1966) - Frazer
- The Wild Angels (1966) - Hospital Policeman
- Murderers' Row (1966) - Furnas (uncredited)
- Hell on Wheels (1967) - Ben
- If He Hollers, Let Him Go! (1968) - Sergeant
- Bullitt (1968) - (voice, uncredited)
- The Bamboo Saucer (1968) - Technician at Radio (uncredited)
- The Christine Jorgensen Story (1970) - Newspaper Reporter at Airport

=== Television ===
- The George Burns and Gracie Allen Show (1951-1955, 3 episodes) - Charlie Hawthorne / Sergeant McDuff
- Dick Tracy (1952, 1 episode) - Influence
- Dangerous Assignment (1952, 1 episode)
- Racket Squad (1952, 1 episode)
- Dragnet (1952-1958, 8 episodes) - Jake / Harry Talmadge
- Big Town (1953, 2 episode) - Duke Barker
- I Married Joan (1953, 2 episodes) - Dr. Griswald / Tom
- Four Star Playhouse (1953-1954, 2 episodes) - Mr. Braun / Tender
- I Love Lucy (1953-1956, 2 episodes) - Helicopter Pilot / Short Indian
- Our Miss Brooks (1954, 1 episode) - Jailor
- The Pepsi-Cola Playhouse (1954, 1 episode) - George Harper
- The Whistler (1954, 1 episode) - Max Fenner
- The Adventures of Kit Carson (1954, 2 episodes)
- Schlitz Playhouse of Stars' (1954-1956, 3 episodes) - Joe Garson / Corporal Williams / Frank Pierce
- General Electric Theater (1954–1962, 2 episodes) - Dan Farrol / Hugo
- Treasury Men in Action (1955, 1 episode) - Detective Sergeant Draper
- The Man Behind the Badge (1955, 1 episode) - Bernie
- Star Stage (1955, 1 episode)
- Highway Patrol (1955, 1 episode) - Sergeant Betts
- Science Fiction Theatre (1954-1956, 2 episodes) - Joe Garson / Corporal Williams / Frank Pierce
- Alfred Hitchcock Presents (1955) (Season 1 Episode 9: "The Long Shot") - Police Sergeant Mack
- Disneyland (1955-1958, 2 episodes) - George McShane / Rocket Ship Crew
- Adventures of Falcon (1956, 1 episode) - Mike Poggin
- Crusader (1956, 1 episode) - Ben Kelder
- Cavalcade of America (1956, 1 episode) - Brigadier General N. D. Cota
- Crossroads (1956, 2 episodes) - Tito Krackow
- The Adventures of Dr. Fu Manchu (1956, 1 episode) - Ivan Thor
- Studio 57 (1956-1957, 1 episode) - Marshal
- On Trial (1955-1957, 2 episodes) - Vinnie / Williams
- The Life and Legend of Wyatt Earp (1956-1960, 8 episodes) - Dick Gurd / Ganly / Whitey Rupp
- Jeff's Collie aka Lassie (1956-1967, 2 episodes) - Ken Hubbard
- Alfred Hitchcock Presents (1957) (Season 3 Episode 11: "The Deadly") - Police Sergeant Thompson
- The New Adventures of Charlie Chan (1957, 1 episode) - Lieutenant Stutz
- Whirlybirds (1957, 1 episode) - Captain Brown
- Father Knows Best (1957, 1 episode) - Foreman
- Jane Wyman Presents the Fireside Theatre (1956-1957, 3 episodes)
- Telephone Time (1957, 1 episode) - Pierre
- The Silent Service (1957, 1 episode) - First Squailfish Captain
- Code 3 (1957, 1 episode) - Lieutenant Carl Harrison
- The Californians (1957) - 1 episode
- The Millionaire (1957-1959, 3 episodes) - Ross Marshall / Sergeant / Captain Wylie
- Alfred Hitchcock Presents (1958) (Season 3 Episode 30: "Death Sentence") - Police Chief Walt Haney
- Navy Log (1958, 1 episode) - Commander Thompson
- Man Without a Gun (1958, 1 episode)
- Alcoa Theatre (1958, 1 episode) - Colonel
- Jefferson Drum (1958, 1 episode) - Hardy
- Steve Canyon (1958, 1 episode) - General Hall
- Death Valley Days (1958, 2 episodes) - Sam Walton / Charlie Parkhurst
- Sugarfoot (1958, 1 episode) - Bartender
- Rescue 8 (1958,1 episode) - Building Inspector
- Tales of Wells Fargo (1958-1962, 2 episodes) - Tim / John Curtis
- Wagon Train (1958-1962) - 3 episodes
- Mike Hammer (1959) - 1 episode
- The Fat Man: The Thirty Two Friends of Gina Lardelli (1959) - TV movie
- Cimarron City (1959) - 1 episode
- Behind Closed Doors (1959) - 1 episode
- The Third Man (1959, 1 episode) - Captain Gallifa
- Richard Diamond, Private Detective (1959, 1 episode) - Lieutenant
- Tombstone Territory (1959, 1 episode) - Deputy Marshal Bledsoe
- Have Gun - Will Travel (1959, 1 episode) - Bartender
- Leave It to Beaver (1959, 1 episode) - Police Sergeant
- The Man and the Challenge (1959, 1 episode) - Ed Burke
- U.S. Marshal (1959, 1 episode) - Max
- The Untouchables (1959-1960, 2 episodes) - Police Captain / Schultz Man
- Peter Gunn (1959-1961, 2 episodes) - Frank Clanton / Jake Lynch
- Bat Masterson (1960, 1 episode) - Sheriff
- Goodyear Theatre (1960, 1 episode) - Pat Harris
- Tightrope (1960, 1 episode) - Charlie
- Colt .45 (1960, 1 episode) - Ed Garrick
- Hawaiian Eye (1960, 1 episode) - Major Dunham
- Bourbon Street Beat (1960, 1 episode) - Sergeant Steve Travis
- The Andy Griffith Show (1960, 1 episode) - Derekson
- Lock-Up (1960, 1 episode) - Johnny Gibson
- The June Allyson Show (1960, 1 episode) - Judge
- Dan Raven (1960, 1 episode) - Harrow
- 77 Sunset Strip (1960-1961, 3 episodes) - Captain Devon / John Carter / Bennie Cannon
- The Jack Benny Program (1960-1963, 4 episodes) - Sound Man / Deli Clerk / Larry Hawkins / Lockup Policeman
- Wanted: Dead or Alive (1961) - 1 episode
- Rawhide (1961) (Season 3 Episode 11: "Incident of the Broken Word") – Bartender
- Checkmate (1961) - 1 episode
- The Case of the Dangerous Robin (1961) - 1 episode
- Lawman (1961) - 1 episode
- The Americans (1961) - 1 episode
- The Best of the Post (1961, 1 episode) - Steve
- Angel (1961, 1 episode: The Wedding) - Mr. Butler
- The McGonigle (1961, TV Movie) - Captain Amboy
- Cheyenne (1961, 1 episode) - Hammond
- The Everglades (1961, 1 episode) - Rafe
- Shotgun Slade (1961, 1 episode)
- Laramie (1961, 1963, 2 episodes) - Judge Wheeler / Sheriff Aikens
- Perry Mason (1961-1964, 3 episodes) - Sergeant Steve Toland / Detective Steve Toland / Allen
- 87th Precinct (1962, 1 episode) - Ed Bennett
- Bonanza (1962-1967, 2 episodes) - Strand / Jake Weber
- G.E. True (1963, 1 episode) - William J. Burns
- Glynis (1963, 1 episode) - Manny
- McHale's Navy (1963-1965, 2 episodes) - Captain Cummings / Captain Dawson
- Channing (1964, 1 episode) - Policeman
- Vacation Playhouse (1964, 1 episode)
- The Donna Reed Show (1965, 1 episode)
- Mr. Novak (1965, 1 episode) - Adams
- The Virginian (1965-1966, 2 episodes) - Milt Shiffman / Clint Koski
- Branded (1966, 1 episode) - Major Meade
- Laredo (1966, 1 episode) - Farmer
- The Loner (1966, 1 episode) - Miner
- The Patty Duke Show (1966, 1 episode) - Man
- Honey West (1966, 1 episode) - Director
- The Green Hornet (1966, 1 episode) - Mel Hurk
- Hogan's Heroes (1967, 1 episode) - General Aloysius Barton
- Dragnet (1967, 1 episode) - Albert Marks
- Ironside (1967–1968, 2 episodes) - Buck Dennison / Eddie Burns
- Fantastic Four (1967–1968) - Blastaar (voice)
- Gomer Pyle, U.S.M.C. (1967, 1969, 2 episodes) - Plainclothes Man / Driver
- Arabian Knights (1968) - (voice)
- The Banana Splits Adventure Hour (1968-1969, 8 episodes) - Raseem
- Lancer (1969, 1 episode) - Lem Cable
- Mannix (1970, 1 episode) - Harry C. Armitage
- San Francisco International Airport (1970, 1 episode: San Francisco International) - Congressman (final appearance)

=== Radio ===
- Escape
