= Kim Kahana =

American actor and stunt performer (1929–2024)

Kim Kahana Sr.
- Born: Kim Kahana; October 16, 1929; Lanai City, Hawaii Territory, U.S.
- Died: August 12, 2024 (aged 94); Groveland, Florida, U.S.
- Occupations: Stunt performer; actor; martial arts instructor
- Years active: 1953–2024
- Spouse: Sandy Kahana (m. 2005)
- Children: 4
- Website: http://kahanastuntschool.com

Kim Kahana Sr. (October 16, 1929 – August 12, 2024) was an American actor, stunt performer, and action choreographer of Hawaiian and Japanese descent. He worked on stunts for over 300 films and television programs and ran a stunt school in Groveland, Florida, that has trained over 15,000 students.

== Early life and military service ==
Kim Kahana was born in Lanai City, Hawaii, on October 16, 1929. Unable to read or write, Kahana dropped out of school in third grade. At age 13 he hitchhiked across the United States by himself, sometimes stealing in order to eat. His performing career began as a knife and fire dancer in a stage show called Samoan Warriors.

Kahana served as a paratrooper in the Korean War where he was captured and shot by an enemy firing squad. Feigning death, he was left by his captors in a mass grave from which he escaped. A hand grenade explosion also rendered him sightless for two years and permanently blind in his left eye. The U.S. Army awarded Kahana a Silver Star and two Bronze Star Medals, as well as two Purple Hearts for his services.

In 1955, Kahana survived a plane crash in the state of Texas that killed the other 32 people on board. Surviving this crash and his experiences in Korea imbued Kahana with a personal life philosophy of, "Maybe I'm right where I ought to be."

== Film, television and stunt career ==
Kahana entered film after the Korean War, working as an extra, playing a motorcycle rider in 1953's The Wild One. When he saw that stunt performers were paid more than extras, he pursued a stunt career, training with Yakima Canutt and John Eppers. By the 1960s and throughout the '70s and '80s, he worked steadily as a stuntman for many films including Cool Hand Luke (1967), Planet of the Apes (1968), Che! (1969), Patton (1970), The Omega Man (1971), Joe Kidd (1972), Soylent Green (1973), Burt Reynolds' Smokey and the Bandit franchise, and the disaster films of Irwin Allen. Kahana also doubled for Charles Bronson in his films for over 20 years.

Kahana also performed and coordinated fight scenes and stunts (often uncredited) for numerous TV shows, including 28 episodes of Kung Fu, and made numerous appearances on other programs, including Mission: Impossible; The Six Million Dollar Man; Vega$; Magnum, P.I.; Charlie's Angels; Quincy, M.E.; Fantasy Island; The Brady Bunch; and Nickelodeon GUTS. Because of his size (5 ft 7 in (170 cm)) Kahana frequently acted as stunt double for female actors, including Stefanie Powers of The Girl from U.N.C.L.E. and Sally Field on The Flying Nun.

In 1968, Kahana played a leading role in the Hanna-Barbera children's adventure serial Danger Island, a live-action serialized adventure story that appeared as part of The Banana Splits Adventure Hour. His character, Chongo, was a mute castaway from a shipwrecked merchant marine vessel who communicated only using hand signs and bird calls. As the comedic sidekick to fellow castaway Elihu Morgan (played by Rockne Tarkington), Chongo's antics prompted his friend to call out, "Uh-oh Chongo!". The catchphrase became popular with children during the following decade, and inevitably followed Kahana in his work and personal life. Because Danger Island aired weekly and Kahana worked both as an actor and as a stunt performer, he was one of the highest paid stunt people in the business.

Over his first three decades of work as a stunt performer, Kahana broke his bones more than 60 times. By the 1980s, Kahana had moved away from doing "life-threatening" stunts while still continuing to coordinate action scenes and perform his own stunt work.

Kahana served as a member of the Stuntmen's Association of Motion Pictures and spent eight years on the Screen Actors Guild's Safety Investigative Team and the Stunt Safety Committee. He ran a production company called Stunt Action & Safety Coordinator, Inc. that ran second unit production for major motion pictures. He opened the Kahana Stunt School in 1972 to train performers in stunt work and safety, as well as how to navigate the motion picture and television industries.

== Other work ==
Kahana studied martial arts in Japan where he earned six black belts in karate, aikido and jujutsu. In addition to teaching stunts, he is a martial arts and hand-to-hand combat instructor and weapons expert. Kahana has also run a bodyguard agency, employing as many as 30 people at once.

== Personal life and death ==
Kim Kahana had three sons, Tony, Rick, and Kim Jr., and one daughter, Debbie. All of them teach at Kahana's school, hold black belts in karate and have also performed in numerous blockbuster films. In 2005 Kahana Sr. married his wife Sandra, who works as the lead administrator for the stunt school.

On July 24, 2012, Kim Kahana lost his son Rick Kalua Kahana, who died at his home in Canoga Park, California.

Kim Kahana died at his home in Groveland on August 12, 2024, at the age of 94.

== Selected filmography ==
- Jeepers Creepers (2001) Actor, Stunt Player
- Matinee (1993) Stunts
- Nickeloden GUTS (1992–1995) Stunt Director, Stunt Coordinator
- Passenger 57 (1992) Stunts
- Street Soldiers (1991) Stunt Director, Stunt Coordinator
- Revenge (1990) Stunts
- Mind Games (1989) Stunts
- Exterminator 2 (1984) Actor
- Smokey and the Bandit II (1980) Stunts
- Buck Rogers in the 25th Century (1979) Stunts
- Up (1976) Stunt Coordinator
- The Killer Elite (1975) Stunts, Actor, Advisor
- Table for Three Stunt Coordinator
- Danger Island on the Banana Splits Adventure Hour (1968–69) as Chongo
