= The Banana Splits =

American children's television variety show

- Original title card
- Also known as: The Banana Splits Adventure Hour; The Banana Splits and Friends Show
- Genre: Psychedelia; Comedy; Adventure; Fantasy; Musical
- Developed by: William Hanna; Joseph Barbera
- Directed by: Richard Donner (season 1); Tom Boutross (season 2)
- Presented by: Fleegle; Bingo; Drooper; Snorky
- Starring: Jeff Winkless (as Jeffrey Brock); Ginner Whitcombe (as Fleegle 2008); Terence H. Winkless (as Terence Henry); Dan Winkless (as Daniel Owen); James "Jimmy" Dove; Steve Kincannon
- Voices of: Paul Winchell; Daws Butler; Don Messick; Allan Melvin
- Theme music composer: Nelson B. Winkless Jr. (credited to Ritchie Adams & Mark Barkan)
- Opening theme: "Tra La La (One Banana, Two Banana)"
- Composers: Ted Nichols; David Mook
- Country of origin: United States
- Original language: English
- No. of seasons: 2
- No. of episodes: 31 (+ shorts)

Production
- Executive producers: William Hanna; Joseph Barbera
- Producer: Edward J. Rosen (season 1)
- Running time: 45–48 minutes
- Production company: Hanna-Barbera Productions

Original release
- Network: NBC
- Release: September 7, 1968 – September 5, 1970

Related
- The Skatebirds; Cattanooga Cats

The Banana Splits is an American children's television variety show produced by Hanna-Barbera Productions and featuring the Banana Splits, a fictional rock band composed of four costumed animal characters in red helmets with yellow crests. The costumed hosts are Fleegle (guitar, vocals), Bingo (drums, vocals), Drooper (bass, vocals), and Snorky (keyboards, effects).

The series ran for 31 episodes on NBC on Saturday mornings from September 7, 1968, to September 5, 1970, and in syndication from 1970 to 1982. The show features the Banana Splits band as live-action costumed characters, who host both live-action and animated segments within their program. The costumes were constructed by Sid and Marty Krofft from designs by Hanna-Barbera artists, and the series' sponsor was Kellogg's Cereals.

A feature-length comedy horror film adaptation, The Banana Splits Movie, premiered at San Diego Comic-Con on July 18, 2019, and was released worldwide on August 13, 2019.

== History ==
In 1967, William Hanna and Joseph Barbera approached Sid and Marty Krofft to build the costumes for a television show featuring animated and live-action segments, hosted by a bubblegum rock group of anthropomorphic animals. The show's format of fast-paced blackout gags was loosely based on Rowan & Martin's Laugh-In, so much so that Barbera and Hanna hired that show's head writers, Phil Hahn and Jack Hanrahan. (The Banana Splits later appeared as guests on Laugh-In on November 18, 1968.)

The Banana Splits Adventure Hour premiered on NBC on September 7, 1968. In his autobiography, Barbera said that the show was originally going to be called The Banana Bunch, but permission could not be obtained from the author of a children's book by that same title.

The Krofft brothers credit the series' success for making possible their own entry into television, H.R. Pufnstuf. NBC picked up the Krofft series, which was launched on August 30, 1969, during an hour-long special hosted by the Banana Splits.

The show's live-action segment Danger Island, a cliffhanger serial, as well as the short-lived Micro Ventures, an animated series consisting of only four episodes, ran alongside the animated segments Arabian Knights and The Three Musketeers. Actors Jan-Michael Vincent (billed as Michael Vincent) and Ronne Troup appeared in the live-action component Danger Island. All the live-action material filmed for the series' first season, including the Banana Splits and Danger Island segments, was directed by Richard Donner.

Jason Ankeny of AllMusic has blamed the show's drastic ratings drop during its second season on the production staff's failure to change backgrounds or set designs, which misled young viewers into thinking that they were watching reruns instead of new episodes.

== Synopsis ==
Each show represented a meeting of the Banana Splits Club, and the wraparounds featured the adventures of the club members, a musical quartet meant to be reminiscent of The Monkees.

The Splits' segments, including songs of the week and comedy skits, served as wraparounds for a number of individual segments.

For the first season, some of the live-action segments—specifically those used during the musical segments—were shot at Six Flags Over Texas, an amusement park in Arlington, Texas. For the second season, filming took place at the Coney Island amusement park in Cincinnati, Ohio. In many episodes, the Banana Splits were seen riding the many rides at Six Flags and Coney Island.

The Banana Buggies, mentioned in the theme song, were customized vehicles driven by each live-action character. The buggies were customized Amphicat six-wheel drive all-terrain vehicles, each decorated to resemble the character who drove it. Plastic 1/25 scale model kits were issued by Aurora Plastics Corporation (catalog number 832) beginning in 1969. They were never reissued by Aurora, but have since been released as high-end resin-based kits.

The Banana Splits was one of the first two Hanna-Barbera series in 1968 for which Hanna and Barbera received executive producer credits, the other being The New Adventures of Huckleberry Finn; Edward Rosen was the producer on both series. It was also one of the first Saturday morning shows to use a laugh track, but only during the live-action comedy segments. In its first year, the cartoons were adventure-based and did not have laugh tracks (the first Saturday-morning cartoon with a laugh track was Filmation's The Archie Show).

== Characters ==
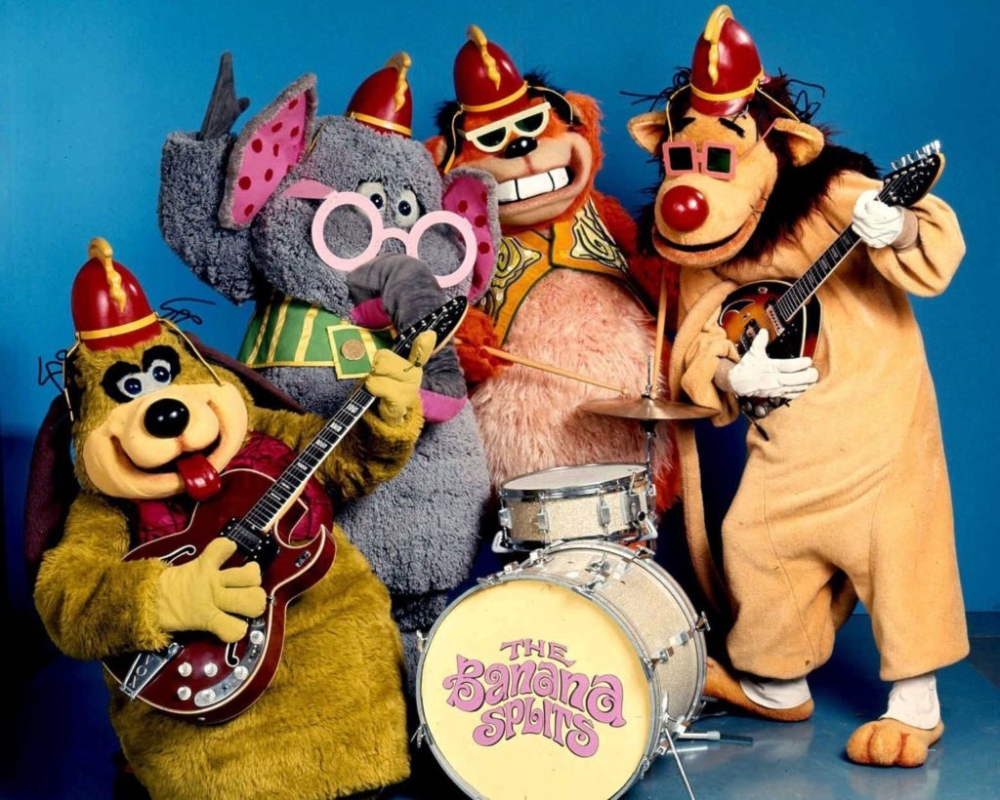
(L–R) Fleegle, Snorky, Bingo, and Drooper

- Fleegle – A beagle with a lisp and the Splits' self-proclaimed leader. Performed on-screen in the original series by Jeff Winkless (1968) and voiced by Paul Winchell (1968–1972). Later performed by Ginner Whitcombe and Keith Scott (2008), Terry Sauls and Eric Bauza (2019 film), and Paul F. Tompkins (in Jellystone!).
- Bingo – A nasal-voiced orangutan wearing white-framed sunglasses and a yellow vest. Performed on-screen in the original series by Terence H. Winkless (1968) and voiced by Daws Butler (1968–1972). Later performed by Casey Hadfield and Keith Scott (2008), Buntu Plam and Eric Bauza (2019 film), and Jim Conroy (in Jellystone!).
- Drooper – A Southern-accented lion with a long tail, wearing yellowish-orange-framed sunglasses. Performed on-screen in the original series by Anne W. Withrow (1968) and voiced by Allan Melvin (1968–1972). Later performed by Adam Grubner (2008) and voiced by Karl Wiedergott (2008), Kori Clarke and Eric Bauza (2019 film), and C.H. Greenblatt (in Jellystone!).
- Snorky – An elephant wearing pink-framed sunglasses who communicates through honking noises. Originally covered in shaggy fur, he was redesigned for the second season to more resemble a regular elephant. Performed on-screen in the original series by James Dove (1968). Later performed by Robert Towers (2008) and Brandon Vraagom (2019 film).

=== Secondary ===
- Announcer – an unseen narrator who introduced the Banana Splits and certain acts. Voiced by Allan Melvin (1968–1972) and Eric Bauza (2019 film).
- The Banana Vac – A blue moose-like head with brown hair and light bulbs on his head. He hangs over the entrance of the clubhouse making various comments and often helps the Splits introduce segments. Voiced by Allan Melvin.
- Cuckoo Clock – A clock with a blue and yellow bird head inside that gave snarky answers when asked "What time is it?", and helped the Splits introduce segments. Voiced by Paul Winchell.
- Gopher Goofy – A gopher who lived in a flower pot. Voiced by Paul Winchell, he was created for the show's second season.
- Mildred the Robot - An invention of Fleegle's that could grant wishes, often literally. "Performed" by Robby the Robot
- The Sour Grapes Bunch – A group of silent, human girl characters who were all named Charley (played by Debra Thibodeaux, Colette Chenault, Julie Graham, Kathy O'Dare, and Shirley Hillstrom). The Splits' rivals, they took turns bringing written notes to the Splits. They danced one song with the title characters. In the first season, on October 5, 1968, the song "Doin' the Banana Split" had all five girls appear with the hosts.
- The Dilly Sisters – Two Latina girls who played acoustic classical guitars and sang two songs: "The Mexican Hat Dance" and "Ta-ra-ra Boom-de-ay". They became such a running gag that the viewer didn't even have to see them—one of the Splits would open a door and the first line of "Ta-ra-ra Boom-de-ay" would issue from behind the door. The Dilly Sisters were really Miriam and Nelly Nuñez, who recorded pop songs in their native Mexico from 1965 through 1983.

== Segments ==
The show had four segments:

- Arabian Knights – Prince Turhan (voiced by Jay North), his cousin Princess Nida (voiced by Shari Lewis), and their allies Fariik the Magician (voiced by John Stephenson), Raseem the Strong (voiced by Frank Gerstle), his donkey Zazuum (voiced by Don Messick), and shapeshifter Bez (voiced by Henry Corden) work to free Persia from the evil Bakaar the Black Sultan (voiced by John Stephenson) and his enforcer Vangore (voiced by Paul Frees).
- The Three Musketeers – Based on the novel of the same name. Athos (voiced by Jonathan Harris), Porthos (voiced by Barney Phillips), Aramis (voiced by Don Messick), and D'Artagnan (voiced by Bruce Watson) partake in new adventures fighting the enemies of the crowned heads of France King Louis XIII (voiced by Don Messick) and Queen Anne (voiced by Julie Bennett). They are sometimes assisted by a queen's handmaid named Lady Constance Bonacieux (voiced by Julie Bennett) and her young nephew Tooly (voiced by Teddy Eccles).
- Micro Ventures – A four-episode segment where Professor Carter (voiced by Don Messick) and his children Jill (voiced by Patsy Garrett) and Mike (voiced by Tommy Cook) use a shrinking machine to shrink themselves and their dune buggy to miniature size to explore and experience the world from the perspective of an insect.
- Danger Island – The show's only live-action segment. This adventure serial depicts archaeologist Professor Irwin Hayden (portrayed by Frank Aletter), his assistant Lincoln "Link" Simmons (portrayed by Jan Michael Vincent), and his daughter Leslie (portrayed by Ronne Troup) having adventures on an unnamed island chain with a shipwrecked merchant mariner named Elihu Morgan (portrayed by Rockne Tarkington) and his sidekick Chongo (portrayed by Kim Kahana) as they avoid a group of bumbling yet heavily armed modern day pirates led by Captain Mu-Tan (portrayed by Victor Eberg).

In the second season, The Three Musketeers segments were replaced with reruns of The Hillbilly Bears, a cartoon segment that had previously appeared on The Atom Ant Show (1965–1968).

The Banana Splits was syndicated in 1970 to local stations, reformatted as a half-hour show under the title The Banana Splits and Friends Show. The Banana Splits formed a framework for episodes from three of Hanna-Barbera's animated series (The Atom Ant Show, The Secret Squirrel Show, and The Adventures of Gulliver) and the live-action The New Adventures of Huckleberry Finn. All the original Banana Splits episodes were included in this package, with Paul Winchell providing new, spoken introductions for the added components in the series.

== Music ==
The show's theme song, "The Tra La La Song (One Banana, Two Banana)", was credited to Ritchie Adams and Mark Barkan, but that was merely contractual. It was written by Nelson B. Winkless Jr., on the upright piano in his living room—a piano that also spawned the "Snap, Crackle, Pop" jingle, among other successful themes. Adams and Barkan were the show's music directors. The song, a single attributed to the Banana Splits, peaked at #96 on Billboard's Top 100 in February 1969. The version included on the We're the Banana Splits album is the same heard at the beginning of the show, while the single version is an entirely different arrangement and recording, with an additional verse.

The Banana Splits' bubblegum pop rock and roll was provided by studio professionals, including Joey Levine ("I Enjoy Being a Boy", "It's a Good Day for a Parade"); Al Kooper ("You're the Lovin' End"); Barry White ("Doin' the Banana Split"); Gene Pitney ("Two Ton Tessie") and Jimmy Radcliffe, who provided his songs ("I'm Gonna Find a Cave", "Soul", "Don't Go Away Go-Go Girl", "Adam Had 'Em" and "The Show Must Go On") but did not contribute vocals to Splits recordings.

The music director was music publisher Aaron Schroeder; production duties were mainly handled by David Mook. When a heavier R&B vocal was needed, the music producers usually turned to singer Ricky Lancelotti, who was credited under his stage name Rick Lancelot. He went on to record several songs with Frank Zappa. In 1968, the Banana Splits released an album on Decca Records titled We're the Banana Splits.

=== Covers ===
US punk rock act The Dickies covered the theme song in 1978 as "Banana Splits (Tra La La Song)". It reached #7 on the UK charts and appeared as a bonus on the CD reissue of their 1979 album The Incredible Shrinking Dickies.

The song was also covered as the first track on the album Saturday Morning: Cartoons' Greatest Hits by Liz Phair with Material Issue in 1995.

== Comics ==
The Banana Splits' adventures continued in comic books. Gold Key began publishing a comic version in June 1969, releasing eight issues through October 1971. Drawn by Jack Manning, these stories followed the musicians either trying to find work or on the road between gigs.

The Banana Splits had a crossover with the Suicide Squad in Suicide Squad/Banana Splits #1 on March 29, 2017.

== Other projects ==
=== Made-for-television film ===
Hanna-Barbera produced The Banana Splits in Hocus Pocus Park, a televised feature film, for ABC in 1972 that has the group rescuing a girl from an evil witch.

=== Educational films ===
- Hanna-Barbera Educational Filmstrips
  - The Banana Splits: Healthy and Happy (1978)
  - The Banana Splits: We Have Five Senses (1978)
  - The Banana Splits: Safety First (1978)
  - The Banana Splits: It's a Sense-sational World (1979)
  - The Banana Splits: Meet the Microbes (1980)
- Learning Tree Filmstrip Set
  - Learning About Holidays with The Banana Splits (1982)

=== 2008 revival ===
In August 2008, Warner Bros. Consumer Products announced a multi-platform release featuring new comedy shorts/series and music videos. It debuted on Cartoon Network on September 2, 2008. Keith Scott voiced Fleegle, Bingo and the announcer, and an unknown actor voiced Drooper. The series included a live show and a website, as well as a CD and a DVD featuring 13 new songs, released by Universal Records.

A child-themed area, Banana Splitsville, was also installed at Myrtle Beach, South Carolina's Hard Rock Park rock-and-roll theme park, which later became Freestyle Music Park before closing permanently in 2009.

=== 2016 revival pilot ===
In 2016, Warner Bros. teamed up with Christian Jacobs' production company Awesome Forces! to create a pilot for another potential revival of the series. Despite using the designs and costumes from the 2008 revival, it looked to capture the spirit and tone of the original series. Parts of the pilot were filmed on location at Castle Park in Riverside, California.

Despite claims that Warner Bros. loved the pilot, the idea for a full series was shelved, leaving the pilot completed, yet unreleased.

=== 2019 comedy horror film ===
On February 19, 2019, Warner Bros. Television Group's Blue Ribbon Content division announced that it was collaborating with Blue Ice Pictures on producing a film adaptation of the Banana Splits television series collectively named The Banana Splits Movie, which would serve as an R-rated slasher film. Danishka Esterhazy was hired to direct the film, based on a script written by Jed Elinoff and Scott Thomas. On June 13, 2019, Syfy Wire released the official trailer for the film. The film was released worldwide on August 13, 2019.

=== Jellystone! ===
The Banana Splits appear in Jellystone! which was released HBO Max on July 29, 2021 with Fleegle voiced by Paul F. Tompkins, Bingo voiced by Jim Conroy, and Drooper voiced by show creator C. H. Greenblatt. They are portrayed as cartoonishly effective criminals and the enemies of El Kabong.

== Home media ==
The first episode "The Littlest Musketeer" was released on the DVDs Saturday Morning Cartoons 1970s Vol. 2 and Saturday Morning Cartoons: 1960s-1980s Collection.

On September 21, 2009, Warner Home Video released the complete first season on DVD in Region 2. The six-disc set consists of 36 edited half-hour episodes of The Banana Splits and Friends Show. The series was also released on VHS.

== Reruns ==
The Banana Splits and Friends series appeared in reruns from 1972 to 2013. The series has aired on TBS, Cartoon Network, and Boomerang.

== See also ==
- List of works produced by Hanna-Barbera Productions
- List of Hanna-Barbera characters
