= Micro Ventures =

1968 American animated TV series

- Genre: Educational
- Voices of: Don Messick; Patsy Garrett; Tommy Cook
- Country of origin: United States
- Original language: English
- No. of episodes: 4

Production
- Executive producers: William Hanna; Joseph Barbera
- Running time: 4 minutes
- Production company: Hanna-Barbera Productions

Original release
- Network: NBC
- Release: November 9 – December 21, 1968

Micro Ventures is an American animated television series created by Hanna-Barbera Productions which originally aired as a four-minute segment on The Banana Splits Adventure Hour. It ran for only four episodes from November 9, 1968 to December 21, 1968 on NBC.

== Summary ==
In each episode, Professor Carter and his two teenage kids, Mike and Jill, use a shrinking machine (the micro-reducer) to shrink themselves and their dune buggy to miniature size to explore and experience the world from the perspective of an insect.

== Voices ==
- Don Messick – Professor Carter
- Patsy Garrett – Jill Carter
- Tommy Cook – Mike Carter

== Episodes ==
No.	Title	Original release date
1	"The Tiny Sea"	November 9, 1968
Professor Carter, Mike and Jill change to micro-size near a pond so that they can get a closer look at a bullfrog, unaware that a predacious hawk is tailing them.
2	"The Dangerous Desert"	November 23, 1968
Professor Carter, Mike and Jill change to micro-size by the wreckage of a rocket in order to locate a minuscule microchip, but a Gila monster stands in their way.
3	"The Backyard Jungle"	December 7, 1968
Professor Carter, Mike and Jill change to micro-size in their backyard to help Jill with her entomology project. There is much danger on the journey, especially from a cat.
4	"Exploring an Ant Colony"	December 21, 1968
Professor Carter, Mike and Jill change to micro-size to observe an ant colony. Then an Amazon ant attack on the colony occurs.
