= Danger Island (TV series) =

Television series

- Title card
- La Isla del Peligro
- Genre: Adventure
- Directed by: Richard Donner
- Starring: Frank Aletter; Jan-Michael Vincent; Ronne Troup; Rockne Tarkington; Kim Kahana; Victor Eberg
- Narrated by: Frank Aletter
- Theme music composer: Nelson B. Winkless Jr. Ritchie Adams; Mark Barkan
- Opening theme: "Danger Island Main Theme"
- Composers: Ted Nichols; David Mook
- Countries of origin: United States; Mexico
- Original languages: English; Spanish; Nahuatl
- No. of episodes: 36

Production
- Executive producers: Joseph Barbera; William Hanna
- Producer: Edward J. Rosen
- Production locations: Acapulco, Guerrero, Mexico
- Running time: 10 minutes (per episode)
- Production company: Hanna-Barbera Productions

Original release
- Network: NBC
- Release: September 7, 1968 – January 11, 1969

Related
- The Banana Splits Adventure Hour; Mystery Island

Danger Island (Spanish: La Isla del Peligro) is an American-Mexican live-action adventure serial produced by Hanna-Barbera Productions and originally broadcast on NBC during the 1968–69 season, as a segment of The Banana Splits Adventure Hour. It was filmed in Mexico, directed by future Superman, The Goonies and Lethal Weapon director Richard Donner, and featured Jan-Michael Vincent as Lincoln 'Link' Simmons.

The series comprises a six-hour adventure yarn broken down into 36 short chapters. Each chapter is roughly ten minutes long and includes a suspenseful cliffhanger ending that is resolved in the next installment. The live-action segment was created to cut production costs on the mostly-animated hour-long show.

== Plot ==
Inspired by the 1964 series Jonny Quest (also produced by Hanna-Barbera), Danger Island depicted the adventures of a trio of explorers in an unnamed tropical island group: Prof. Irwin Hayden, an archaeologist; Lincoln "Link" Simmons, the professor's youthful assistant; and Leslie, the professor's daughter, who serves as both a love interest for Link and the series' token damsel in distress.

Several years earlier, the professor's brother (also an archaeologist) disappeared in the same island chain while searching for the mythical lost city of Tobanya. They are joined on their quest by Elihu Morgan, a shipwrecked merchant mariner, and his sidekick Chongo, who speaks only in a series of monkey-like chatters and birdcalls. They are pursued by a group of bumbling, but heavily armed, modern-day pirates led by the murderous Captain Mu-Tan, and by three tribes of cannibal natives known as "the Headhunters", "the Skeleton Men" and "the Ash Men". The show spawned a popular catchphrase, "Uh-oh, Chongo!", among children of that time.

== Characters ==
=== Main characters ===
- Prof. Irwin Hayden – Frank Aletter
- Lincoln 'Link' Simmons – Jan-Michael Vincent (as Michael Vincent)
- Leslie Hayden – Ronne Troup
- Elihu Morgan – Rockne Tarkington
- Chongo – Kim Kahana (as Kahana)

=== Villains ===
- Captain Mu-Tan – Victor Eberg
- Chu – Rodrigo Arrendondo

== Home media ==
The first episode was released on the DVDs Saturday Morning Cartoons 1970s Vol. 2 & Saturday Morning Cartoons: 1960s-1980s Collection.
