= The Three Musketeers (American TV series) =

1968 American animated television series by Hanna Barbera

- Genre: Adventure
- Created by: William Hanna; Joseph Barbera
- Based on: The Three Musketeers; by Alexandre Dumas
- Directed by: William Hanna; Joseph Barbera
- Voices of: Julie Bennett; Teddy Eccles; Jonathan Harris; Don Messick; Barney Phillips; Bruce Watson
- Country of origin: United States
- No. of episodes: 18

Production
- Producers: William Hanna; Joseph Barbera
- Running time: 10 minutes
- Production company: Hanna-Barbera Productions

Original release
- Network: NBC
- Release: September 7, 1968 – May 31, 1969

The Three Musketeers is an American Saturday morning cartoon produced by Hanna-Barbera Productions for NBC. It premiered in 1968, running for 18 episodes as a segment on The Banana Splits Adventure Hour. The cartoon is based on the 1844 novel The Three Musketeers by Alexandre Dumas.

Lady Constance appears in the third season of Jellystone!

== Premise ==
Athos (voiced by Jonathan Harris), Porthos (voiced by Barney Phillips), Aramis (voiced by Don Messick), and D'Artagnan (voiced by Bruce Watson) partake in new adventures fighting the enemies of the crowned heads of France King Louis XIII (voiced by Don Messick) and Queen Anne (voiced by Julie Bennett).

The musketeers are sometimes assisted by a queen's handmaid named Lady Constance Bonacieux (voiced by Julie Bennett) and her young nephew Tooly (voiced by Teddy Eccles). A recurring theme has Tooly trying to prove himself worthy of becoming a Musketeer but the Musketeers will not allow him into their services because of his age. Tooley, who has a white horse, named Lightning, does get a present from the Musketeers, a mule for his birthday. Several of the cartoons end with the slogan "All for one, and one for all".

== Episodes ==
No.	Title	Original release date
1	"The Littlest Musketeer"	September 7, 1968
Count Douvac is intent on making Spain declare war on France. The Musketeers ride to save the Spanish envoy and arrest Count Douvac.
2	"The Jewel of India"	September 14, 1968
The Musketeers deliver the Jewel of India for the Queen of Spain, but the Jester steals it. The Musketeers follow him, fight off the corrupt Duke and recover the jewel.
3	"A Letter of Peril"	September 21, 1968
The Musketeers intercept a letter from Duke Lavauh plotting treachery against the king. The Duke kidnaps Constance, the Queen's handmaiden, to exchange for the return of his letter. The Musketeers attempt to rescue Constance and stop the Duke.
4	"The Ring"	September 28, 1968
While visiting the King, Prince Abdhul has his pet monkey, Habib, steal the King's ring. He then uses the ring to order all the guards and Musketeers away while he loots the King's treasury. It's then up to Tooly to inform the Musketeers.
5	"The Plot of the Puppetmaster"	October 5, 1968
Lazaraque the puppetmaster and his little people steal the royal crown. It's then up to the Musketeers and Tooly to get it back.
6	"The Moorish Galley"	October 12, 1968
The Musketeers are captured by "His Excellency" and must escape.
7	"The True King"	October 19, 1968
After the King is taken prisoner and replaced by his long, lost evil twin brother, the evil king abolishes the Musketeers by decree. With Tooly's help, the Musketeers rescue the true King, but the evil twin gets away.
8	"The Pirate Adventure"	October 26, 1968
While trying to stop a pirate named The Black Corsair from capturing the King's ship, the "Man of War", Tooly and Porthos are taken prisoner. Tooly escapes to get the Musketeer's help to come and rescue Porthos.
9	"The Evil Falconer"	November 2, 1968
The Falconer trains his falcon, Diablo, to kidnap the Prince to be held hostage. Diablo kidnaps Tooly by mistake and the Musketeers must save him.
10	"The Mysterious Message"	November 9, 1968
Tooly is captured while trying to help a woman named Marie, who is being held prisoner by her brother. When Constance and the Musketeers get worried the Musketeers go looking for him.
11	"The Challenge for the Crown"	November 16, 1968
Baron Barok attempts to take the crown.
12	"The Red Duke"	November 23, 1968
After the mysterious Red Duke steals the defense plans for the castle, the musketeers must recover the plans and uncover the identity of the thief.
13	"The Outlaw Archer"	November 30, 1968
The Musketeers try to catch the Outlaw Archer, but their plans are temporarily foiled by the "helpful" Tooly.
14	"Tooly's Dream"	December 7, 1968
As the Musketeers go on their latest mission, Constance puts Tooly to bed where he dreams that he is a Musketeer.
15	"The Haunted Castle"	December 14, 1968
When the Musketeers investigate a haunted castle, all get captured but one. But the one committing the thefts and hiding out as ghosts at the castle turns out to be Martineau, the Highwayman.
16	"A Fair Day for Tooly"	January 4, 1969
Tooly attends a fair where he is kidnapped during a plot to steal the Queen's jewels. The Three Musketeers must then free Tooly, and recover the stolen jewels.
17	"Tooly's Treasure Hunt"	January 11, 1969
The Three Musketeers come to the aide of Tooly, who inadvertently discovers the thief that stole the gold Bando from the King's carriage.
18	"Tooly's Surprise"	May 31, 1969
Tooly receives a surprise from the Musketeers (a young pony named Bon Bon). Lightning gets jealous and must help Tooly and Bon Bon when they are attacked by a large bull.

== See also ==
- The Three Musketeers (1973)
- List of works produced by Hanna-Barbera Productions
- List of Hanna-Barbera characters
