= Gilman =

Gilman may refer to:

== Places ==
=== United States ===
- Gilman Ranch, California
- Gilman, Colorado
- Gilman, Illinois
- Gilman, Iowa
- Gilman, Minnesota
- Gilman, Montana
- Gilman, Vermont
- Gilman, Washington, former name of Issaquah
- Gilman, Pierce County, Wisconsin
- Gilman, Taylor County, Wisconsin
- Gilman Lake, a lake in South Dakota
- Gilmanton, New Hampshire
- Gilmanton, Buffalo County, Wisconsin
- Gilmanton Township, Benton County, Minnesota

=== Other ===
- Gilman, Federated States of Micronesia, an administrative division of the Federated States of Micronesia
- Gilman Street, a street in Central, Hong Kong

== Other uses ==
- Gilman (name)
- Gilman reagent, any of a group of reagents discovered by Henry Gilman
- Gilman Paper Company, former paper producer
  - Gilman Paper Company collection, photo archive in the Metropolitan Museum of Art
- Gilman School, a private boys school in Baltimore, Maryland
- 924 Gilman Street, a collectively run music venue in Berkeley, California

== See also ==
- Gillman (disambiguation)
