= Gilman (name) =

Gilman is both a surname and a given name. Notable people with the name include:

== Surname ==
- Alfred G. Gilman (1941–2015), Nobel Prize–winning scientist
- Alfred Gilman Sr. (1908–1984), American pharmacologist
- Alohi Gilman (born 1997), American football player
- Anne Gilman (born 1953), American artist
- Arthur Gilman (1821–1882), Boston architect
- Arthur Gilman (educator) (1837–1909), American educator from Massachusetts
- Benjamin Gilman (1922–2016), American politician from New York
- Benjamin Ives Gilman (1852–1933), American museum curator
- Benjamin Ives Gilman (1766) (1766–1833), American shipbuilder and politician from Ohio
- Billy Gilman (born 1988), country singer
- Caroline Howard Gilman, United States author
- Charlotte Perkins Gilman, feminist author
- Charles Gilman (disambiguation), several persons
- Daniel Coit Gilman, American educator
- Daniel Hunt Gilman, American railroad builder
- Don Gilman (1934–2005), American politician
- Dorothy Gilman, American author
- Family Gilman, organ builders from Kornelimünster
- Felix Gilman, American author
- Franklin Gilman (1825–1880), American politician and farmer
- Fred Gilman, American academic
- George G. Gilman, pseudonym of Terry Harknett (1936–2019), British author of Western novels
- Harold Gilman (1876–1919), British artist
- Henry Gilman, American organic chemist
- Howard Gilman, industrialist and philanthropist
- Jackson Gilman (born 2004), American soccer player
- James Gilman (cricketer) (1879–1976), English cricketer
- John Taylor Gilman (1753–1828), American politician from New Hampshire
- John M. Gilman (1824–1906), American politician and lawyer
- Joseph Gilman (1738–1806), American judge from Ohio
- Kip Gilman (born 1946), American actor
- Laura Anne Gilman, American author
- Laurence Gilman (born 1965), Canadian ice hockey executive
- Lawrence Gilman (1878–1939), American author and music critic
- Marcus D. Gilman (1820–1889), American politician and businessman
- Nicholas Gilman, American politician from New Hampshire, US Constitution signatory
- Phoebe Gilman, American children's book author
- Ronald Lee Gilman, American judge
- Sam Gilman (1915–1985), American actor
- Sander Gilman (born 1944), cultural and literary historian
- Sarah Gilman (born 1996), American actress
- Theodore P. Gilman, American comptroller
- Thomas Gilman (disambiguation)
- Tristram Gilman (1735–1809), minister
- Wilma Anderson Gilman (1881–1971), American pianist, music teacher, clubwoman
- Winthrop Sargent Gilman (1808–1884), American banker and abolitionist

== Given name ==
- Gilman Marston, American politician from New Hampshire
- Gilman Louie, venture capitalist
- George Gilman Fogg, American politician New Hampshire
