= Gilman Paper Company collection =

The Gilman Paper Company collection is an archive of original photographic prints and negatives, and it was donated to the Metropolitan Museum of Art. The collection was formed over the course of two decades (roughly 1977–1997) by Howard Gilman (1924–1998), chairman of the Gilman Paper Company.

== Collection ==
The collection before it was donated to the Metropolitan Museum of Art included a series of photographs of Virginia Oldoini, Countess of Castiglione taken in the 1890s. Virginia Elisabetta Luisa Antonietta Teresa Maria Oldoini received the title Contessa of Castiglione after her marriage to Count Francesco Verasis Asinari of Castigliole d’Asti and Castiglione Tinella. The Contessa of Castiglione commissioned photographer, Pierre-Louis Pierson of Mayer and Pierson, the official photographers of the Imperial Court of Napoleon III, to take the photographs.

== Publication ==
A bound folio of the collection was published as Photographs from the Collection of the Gilman Paper Company by The White Oak Press, 1985. The edition was limited to 1200 copies. The images were curated by Pierre Apraxine and the plates were made by master printer and photographer Richard Benson.

The curated images in Photographs from the Collection of the Gilman Paper Company consist of iconic images from the era of daguerreotypes to 1960's images by Robert Frank and Diane Arbus.

Richard Benson's print work for the publication is described as "the magisterial Photographs from the Collection of the Gilman Paper Company (1985), are the apex of black-and-white, offset lithography presswork."
