= John Howard Benson =

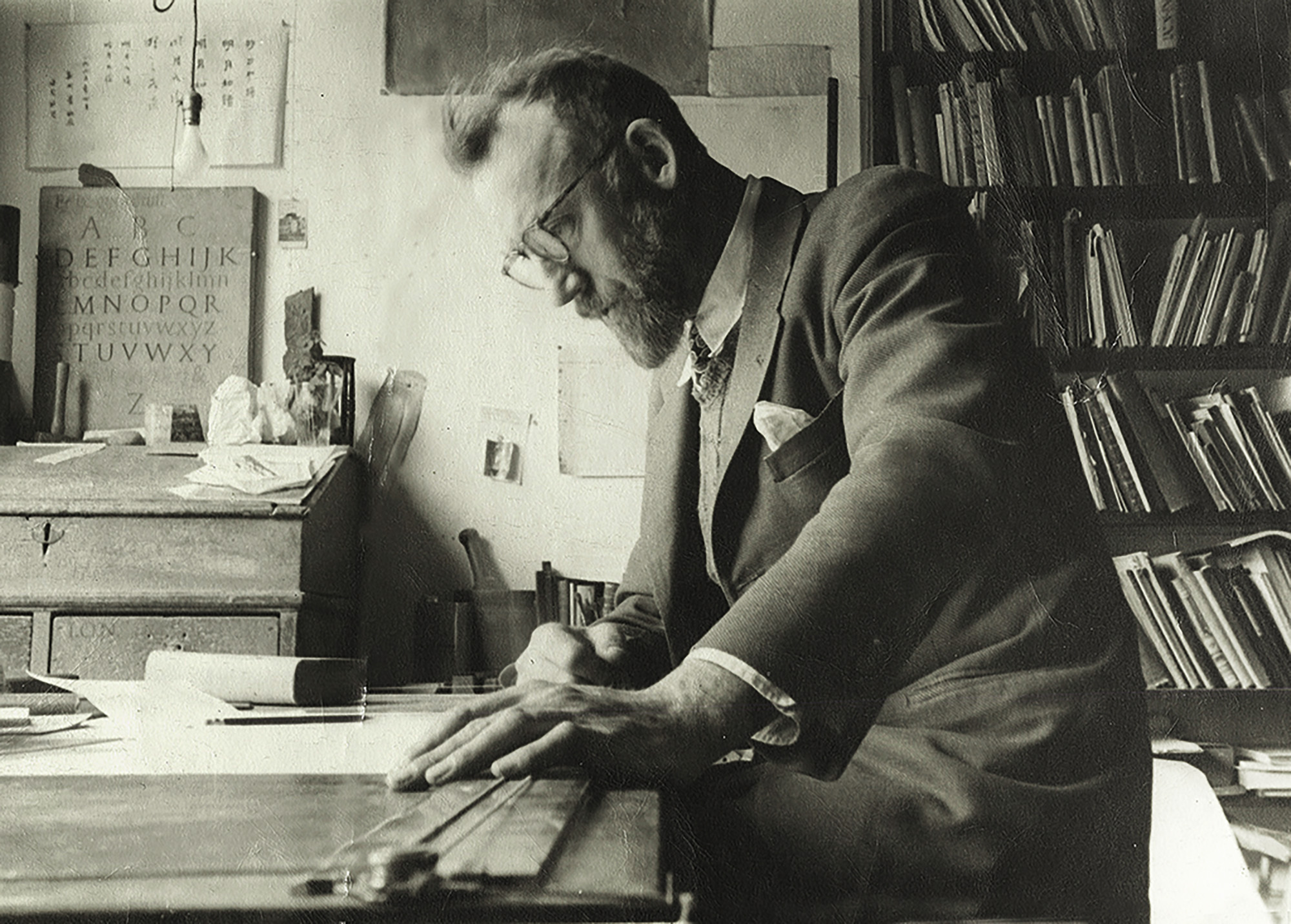
John Howard Benson J.H.B. in The John Stevens Shop circa 1950
- Born: July 6, 1901
- Died: February 23, 1956 (aged 54)
- Occupations: calligrapher, stonecarver, sculptor, letter form designer, author, and educator

John Howard Benson (July 6, 1901 – February 23, 1956) was an American calligrapher, stonecarver, incised letter designer, author, and educator.

== Career ==
He was educated at Rogers High School, the National Academy of Design, and the Art Students League. Benson was a professor of Sculpture and Calligraphy + Design Theory at the Rhode Island School of Design from 1931 to his death in 1956. He did carvings for Rhode Island School of Design, Groton School, Phillips Exeter Academy, and the Metropolitan Museum of Art. Benson designed the school's diploma and seal, in use to this day, as well as the seal of The Wheeler School. Benson was the author of The Elements of Lettering with coauthor Arthur Graham Carey. He was elected to the American Academy of Arts and Sciences in 1955. Robert J. Flaherty began a documentary film on the sculptor.

=== Rhode Island Tercentenary half dollar coin ===
Benson co-designed the 1936 commemorative Rhode Island Tercentenary half dollar with Arthur Graham Carey.

== Personal life ==
Benson was the originator of a long line of stone carving masters in his family. He is the father of John Everett "Fud" Benson and grandfather of Nicholas Benson, the current director of The John Stevens Shop, which was purchased by John Howard in 1927. Benson's youngest son Richard Mead Atwater Benson taught print making and photography at Yale, later becoming the Dean of the Yale School of Art.

One of Benson's many legacies is that Richard and Nick both received MacArthur fellowships, making the Benson family only one of a handful to receive multiple MacArthur awards.

== Bibliography ==
- John E. Benson. The Letter Cutter: The Life and Work of John Howard Benson. Santa Fe: The Fisher Press, 2018. 295 pages. 9780578419084
