= Gillman =

Gillman may refer to:

== People ==
- Gillman (surname)

== Other ==
- Gillman, South Australia, a suburb of Adelaide
- Gill-man, a fictional creature from the 1954 film Creature from the Black Lagoon and sequels
- Gillman Barracks, former army base in Singapore.

== See also ==
- Gillman v. Holmes County School District, a court decision regarding gay rights
- Gilman (disambiguation)
