= Sondra Gilman =

Sondra Minette Gilman Gonzalez-Falla (née Golden, November 26, 1926 – May 26, 2021) was a curator and patron of the arts. Throughout her lifetime, Gilman amassed a sizeable collection of modern art and photography, which included works by Agnes Martin, Andy Warhol, and Robert Mapplethorpe.

Gilman founded and oversaw the Whitney Museum's Photography Acquisition Committee. The photography gallery and the study center are named in her honor. She served as a chair and patron on the Aperture board. In addition to her devotion to photography, Gilman produced, advocated for theater education, and was actively involved with the American Theater Wing. She was a trustee of the Lincoln Center Theatre, and the Patron's Room in the lobby is named after her husband Chris Gilman and herself. As a producer of the critically acclaimed Broadway musical Sophisticated Ladies, she received a Tony nomination.

== Life and career ==
Sondra Gilman was born to Lester and Rose Golden in New York, New York. After graduating from Syracuse University with a bachelor's in art history, she worked as an assistant for journalist Walter Cronkite.

On August 19, 1960, she married Charles "Chris" Gilman Jr., and they raised two children, Hadley and Charles. Her husband became president of the Gilman Paper Company after the death of his father Charles Gilman Sr. in 1967.

The Gilman family's 7,500-acre White Oak Plantation in Yulee, Florida was later transformed into the White Oak Conservation, a conservation preserve and conference center. Gilman and her husband hosted parties and entertained famous guest at the estate. Bob Colacello, former editor of Andy Warhol's Interview magazine, recalled a visit to the property in the September 1975 issue:

Got up early and drove to the Gilmans' estate, "White Oaks," on the St. Mary's River, which is the border between Florida and Georgia. Sandy and Chris Gilman were waiting for us at the entrance to their ultramodern concrete-and-glass house surrounded by thousands of acres of pinelands. They have a beautiful Frank Stella over the couch and a beautiful swimming pool which winds its way under the house. We had champagne and orange juice and then piled into a couple of Cadillacs to drive across the estate to the stables. The Gilmans have 52 thoroughbreds, some for racing and some for hunting.

Following the death of her husband in 1982, Gilman sold her 50 share in the Gilman Paper Company to his brother, Howard Gilman.

=== Photography collection and theater career ===
In 1974, after seeing the work of photographer Eugene Atget an exhibition at the Museum of Modern Art in New York, Gilman started collecting photographs. She purchased three prints for $250 for each.

As a producer of the musical Sophisticated Ladies, Gilman was nominated for a Tony Award for Best Musical in 1981.

In 1986, Gilman married Celso Gonzalez-Falla, a fellow collector of photographs. Governor George W. Bush appointed Gonzalez-Falla to the position of Texas Art Commissioner, which he held from 1997 to 2003.

In 1990, after years of advocating for the Whitney Museum of American Art to start collecting photographs, the institution contacted Gilman for assistance in starting a photography department.

In 1991, Gilman and her husband created the Gilman & Gonzalez-Falla Theatre Foundation.

In 1998, Gilman founded the Sondra Gilman Gallery at the Breuer Building and the Sondra Gilman Curator of Photography.

Gilman and Gonzalez-Falla were named one of the top 10 photo collectors in the world by ARTnews in 2011. They worked together to support the photography community and created an extensive collection. Gillman described their shared commitment in the exhibition In Shared Vision: The Sondra Gilman and Celso Gonzalez-Falla Collection of Photography (2011): "We are custodians, and we feel an obligation to the photographer—to the artist who created the work—to allow it to be seen and exposed as much as it can. We don’t own it. Nobody owns art. It’s passing through us, and we have to take care of it." Their collection served as the focal point of an exhibition at the Museum of Contemporary Art Jacksonville. Gilman's son Charles Gilman III, is a member of the museum's board.

In 2012, Gilman—who was the longest-serving member of the Whitney Museum's board of trustees—was honored at a gala for her contributions, which included donations of artwork and more than $5.8 million.

In 2015, Gilman founded the Sondra Gilman Study Center, a state-of-the-art storage and research facility at the Whitney Museum.

== Death ==
On May 26, 2021, Gilman died from natural causes, in her Kingsland, Georgia, home in The Lakes.
