= John Hegnauer =

American stone carver

John Hegnauer is an American stone carver.

== Life ==
John Hegnauer studied Biology at Chicago's Northwestern University. He came to Newport, Rhode Island, in 1962 to work with John "Fud" Benson in The John Stevens Shop. Together they worked on the inscriptions on the John F. Kennedy memorial at the Arlington National Cemetery. In 1979 Hegnauer left the shop and set up his own shop in Portsmouth, Rhode Island. His work appears on the Robert F. Kennedy memorial in Arlington National Cemetery, Dallas Museum of Art, Massachusetts State House, Virginia Museum of Art, and Boston City Hall among other sites. At Harvard University he designed plaque to commemorate Harvard's Indian College., and a sundial at Lamont Library. He also taught courses in lettering and has had student apprentices from the Rhode Island School of Design. He has since retired and now lives in Newfoundland.
