= Avijit Lahiri =

Avijit Lahiri is a British cardiologist and medical researcher..

== Career ==
He graduated from the Calcutta National Medical College, then affiliated with the University of Calcutta in India. He completed his internship and training at the Northwick Park Hospital, in London. He was a consultant cardiologist and director of cardiac research Institute of Medical Research in Northwick Park Hospital and St. Marks, Imperial College London for over 20 years.

Lahiri is the Director of the Cardiac Imaging and Research Department in Wellington Hospital, London.

Lahiri's research interests are mainly in diagnostic imaging and therapeutics in cardiovascular medicine. He was previously Director of Cardiovascular Research at Northwick Park Hospital, where he performed clinical therapeutic trials, and developed cardiac imaging protocols and techniques.

== Research and trials ==
He has published over 270 peer-reviewed scientific publications 16 book chapters and has presented over 290 invited lectures.

He has contributed to a number of clinical trials, including the first trials of Carvedilol, in heart failure and acute myocardial infarction; the first clinical trial of 7E3 (and its chimeric form), in patients with coronary artery disease; the first clinical trial of Ranolazine in stable angina. He also developed TC-99m tetrofosmin (Myoview) for myocardial perfusion imaging in man in conjunction with Amersham International (now GE).

Founder/Co-president- International Congress of Nuclear Cardiology (ICNC), 1993

Introduced Cardiac CT imaging (Coronary Artery Calcium Scanning) in the UK. Contributed in early diagnostic imaging in asymptomatic diabetes. Referenced in the guidelines of imaging in diabetes- American Heart Association,/American College of Cardiology, European Society of Cardiology and NICE Guidelines.

== Awards and recognition ==
- Honorary member, Royal College of Physicians
- The Howard Gilman Foundation Distinguished Visiting Scholar of Cornell University Medical School
- C Merit awarded by Northwick Park and St. Mark's Hospital
- Director, British Cardiac Research Trust, UK
- The honorary International Professor, Apollo Hospitals Group, India
