= Gidman =

Gidman is a surname. Notable people with the surname include:

- Alex Gidman (born 1981), English cricketer and coach
- John Gidman (born 1954), English footballer
- Will Gidman (born 1985), English cricketer

== See also ==
- Gilman (disambiguation)
