= Gilgan =

Gilgan is a surname. Notable people with the surname include:

- Hugh Gilgan (1852–1887), Irish baseball player

== See also ==
- Gilman (name)
