= Ye Antientist Burial Ground (New London, Connecticut) =

Cemetery in Connecticut

Coordinates: 41°21′33″N 72°6′1″W

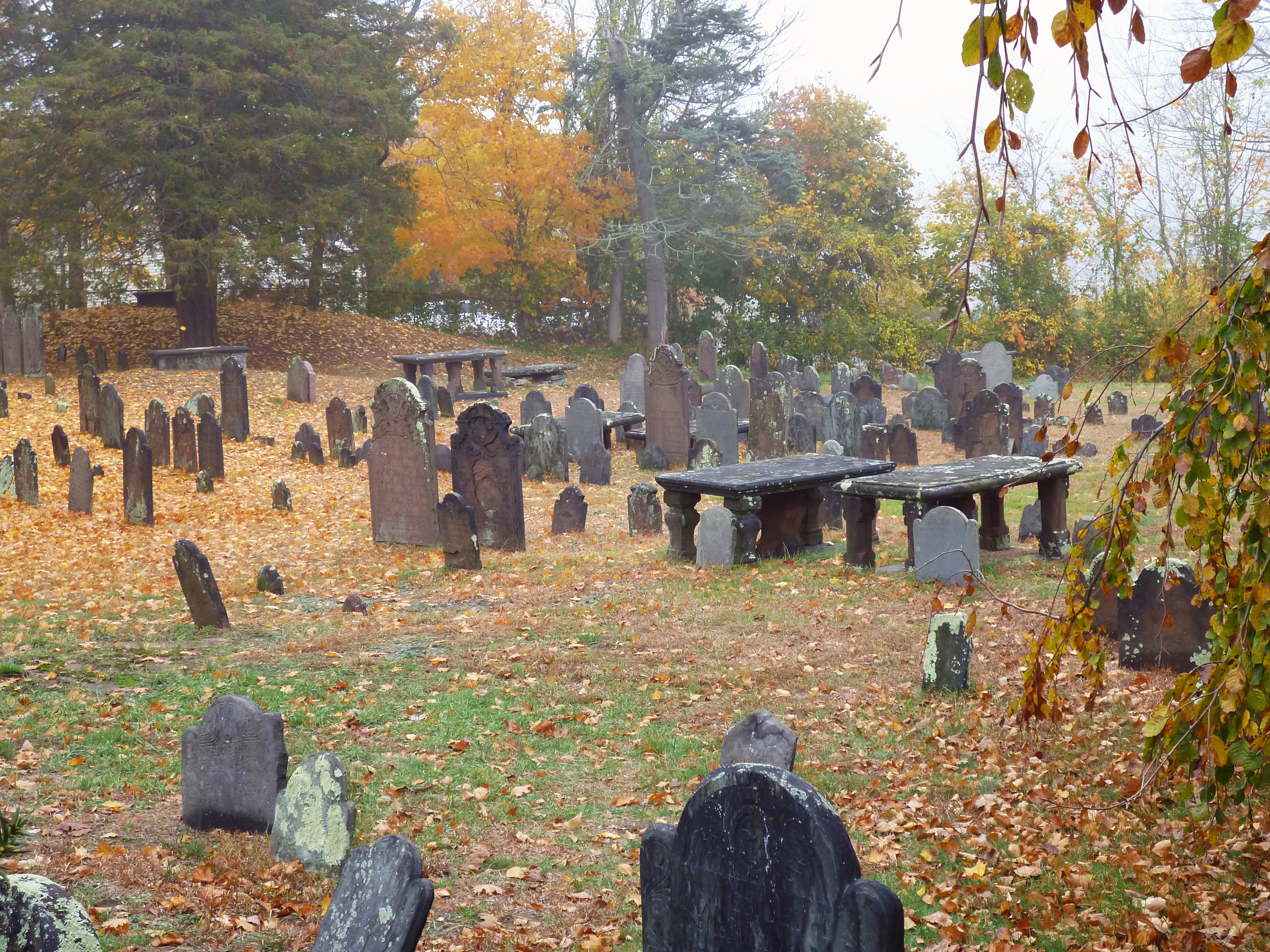
Ye Antientist Burial Ground: "In this ancient cemetery, the graves are irregularly disposed, crowding upon each other without avenues or spaces between families, and most of the head stones are either rude in form and material, or quaint and grotesque in the workmanship and inscription." (Prentis & Caulkins 1899)

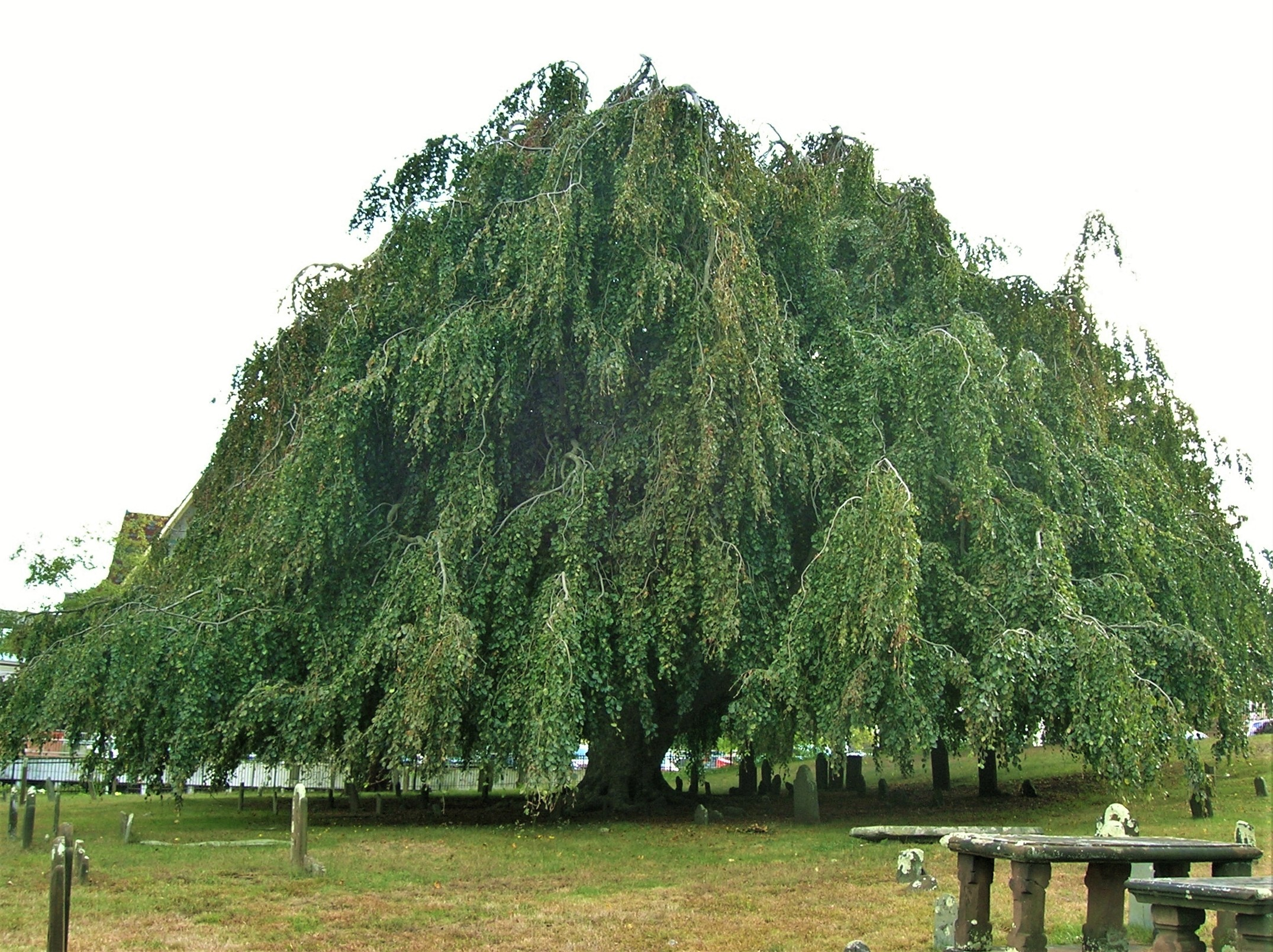
Weeping European Beech (Fagus sylvatica) at Ye Antientist Burial Ground

Ye Antientist Burial Ground is a cemetery in New London, Connecticut, bounded by Hempstead Street on the west and Huntington Street on the east, running from Granite Street to approximately Bristol Street. It has been known by several names over the years, many spelling variations on Ancient Burial Ground. It is one of the earliest graveyards in New England and the oldest colonial cemetery in New London County. The hillside lot of 1.5 acres (6,000 m^{2}) and adjoins the site of New London's first meeting house. The settlement at the time was called "Pequot Plantation" until the name changed in 1658. From the burial grounds, the visitor has a broad view to the east of the Thames River and, on the far shore, the heights of Groton, Connecticut.

== History ==
The lot had been reserved for a burying ground and recorded as such in the summer of 1645. The first decedent "of mature age" was duly interred there in 1652. But it is the ordinance of June 6, 1653 that legally sets the place apart and declares, "It shall ever bee for a Common Buriall place, and never be impropriated by any."

A later record notes the appointment of the sexton:

Whose work is to order youth in the meeting-house, sweep the meeting-house, and beat out dogs, for which he is to have 40s. a year : he is also to make all graves; for a man or woman he is to have 4s., for children, 2s. a grave, to be paid by survivors (Caulkins 1860, p. 111).

17th century New London was yet a rough and isolated corner of early colonial Connecticut. Private interments were not customary, and this was the only common burial place.

The dead were brought in from a distance of six or seven miles (11 km), either carried in hurdles, or borne on a bier upon men's shoulders; large companies assembling, and relieving each other at convenient distances (Prentis & Caulkins 1899, p. 7).

Few of the early graves ever had inscribed markers. The New London of that time possessed no skilled stonecutters, and those early planters simply had not the means. A few surviving families did, however, seek to address the deficiency in later years. At least four stones dated in the 17th century have been found that could not have been placed before 1720 (Slater 1987, p. 221).

If the best man in the community was struck down, his companions could do no more to testify their regret, than to lay him reverently in the grave, and seal it with a rude granite ... broken with ponderous mallets from some neighboring ledge and wearily dragged with ropes to the place and laid over the remains to secure them from disturbance, and mark the spot where a brother was buried (Prentis & Caulkins 1899, p. 6).

As time wore away the unadorned burial hillocks, the older were "covered over with fresh deposits of the dead, so that the numbers here cannot be estimated by the evidences that now remain. ... Yet here undoubtably [sic] were deposited nearly the whole generation of our first settlers" (Prentis & Caulkins 1899, pp. 5, 7).

== Gravestones ==
The oldest grave marker in the yard is dated 1662, and is a brownstone table slab by George Griswold of Windsor, Connecticut. The marker despite holding the distinction of being the oldest grave marker on the eastern side of the Connecticut River is in serious decay. During the early 1700s, Grave Carvers such as John Hartshorne who moved from Massachusetts to Franklin, Connecticut and James Stanclift of Portland, Connecticut were carving quality grave markers that were placed in the yard. Many wealthy families purchased slate tombstones imported from the Boston area or coastal Rhode Island, delivered through the New London Port. The work of carvers such as the Lamsons of Charlestown Massachusetts, the John Stevens Shop of Newport Rhode Island, William Codner of Boston, and George Allen of Providence, Rhode Island can be found in this cemetery. Eastern Connecticut carvers such as Josiah Manning, David Lamb, Gershom Bartlett, and Johnathan Loomis carved stones of granite schist and carvers from the Portland/Middletown region such as the Thomas Johnson Family and later generations of Stanclifts carved markers of brownstone that can be seen in the yard today. Around 1784 Chester Kimball trained by his father, moved to New London and quickly became the most popular gravestone carver around. His career extended into the 19th century, eventually shifting into the urn and willow style.

== Notable burials ==
Note: There is no way of ascertaining which of the founding colonists might have unmarked graves in this burial ground.

- Sarah Kemble Knight (1666–1727): Author (1704) of The Journal of Madame Knight. (ISBN 1-55709-115-3).
- Gurdon Saltonstall (1666–1724): Governor of the Colony of Connecticut, 1708-1724.
- Lucretia Harris Shaw (1737–1781): Wife of Captain Nathaniel Shaw, Jr. She turned her home into a hospital and nursed wounded and sick soldiers returning from the infamous British prison ships at Wallabout Bay (Shiel 2004). As a result, she contracted the Gaol Fever herself and succumbed. The New London chapter of the Daughters of the American Revolution is named in her honor, and her house, the Shaw-Perkins Mansion, has been preserved as the headquarters of the New London County Historical Society since 1907 (Claghorn 2003).
- Thomas Short (1682–1712): Printer (1710) of The Saybrook Platform.

== Gallery ==
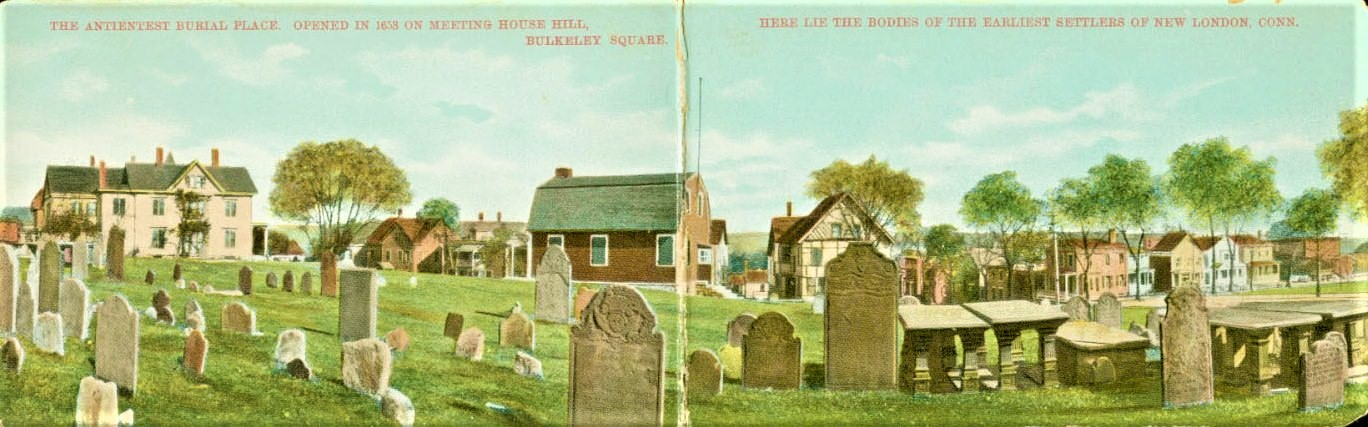
Early 20th-century postcard showing the cemetery

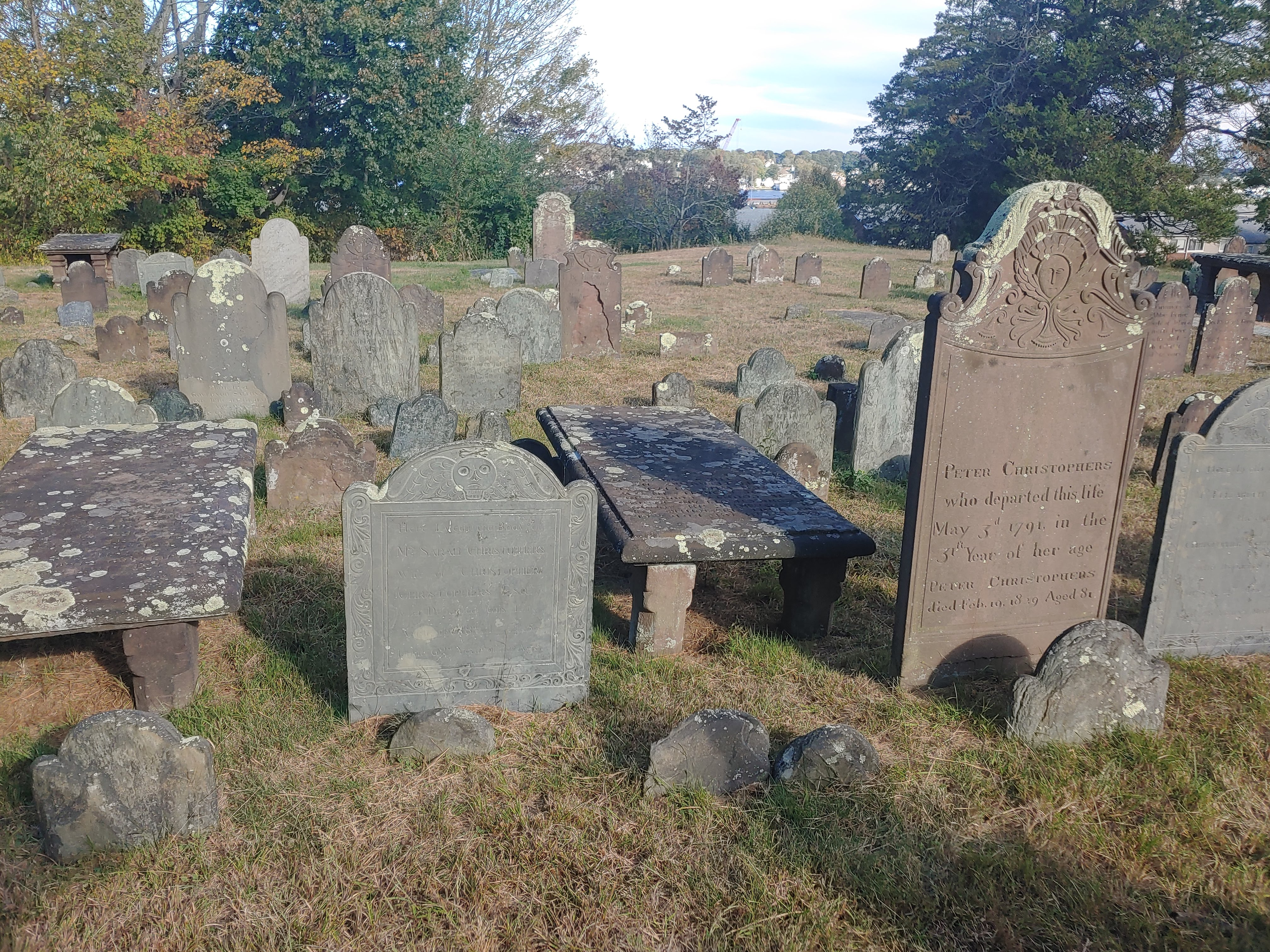
View of the Burial Ground.

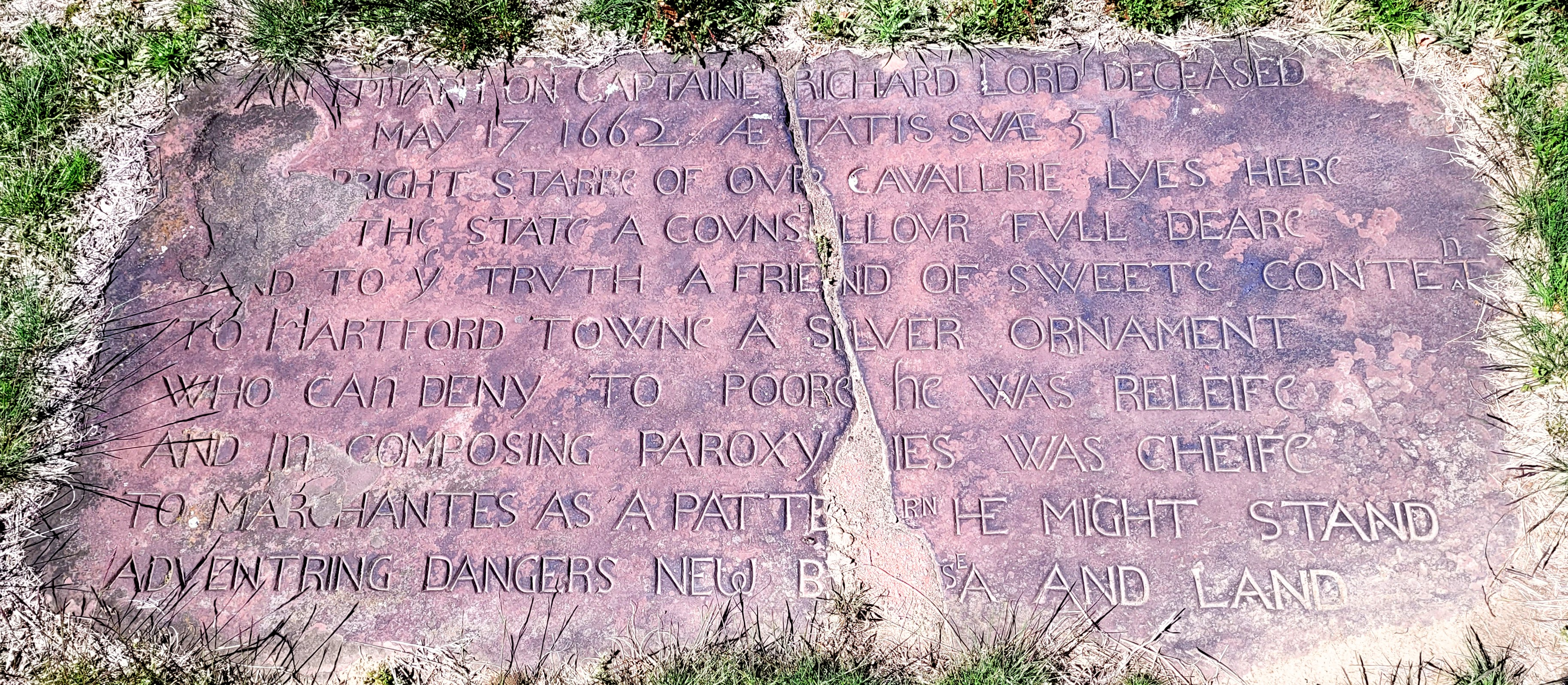
The oldest gravestone in Eastern Connecticut.

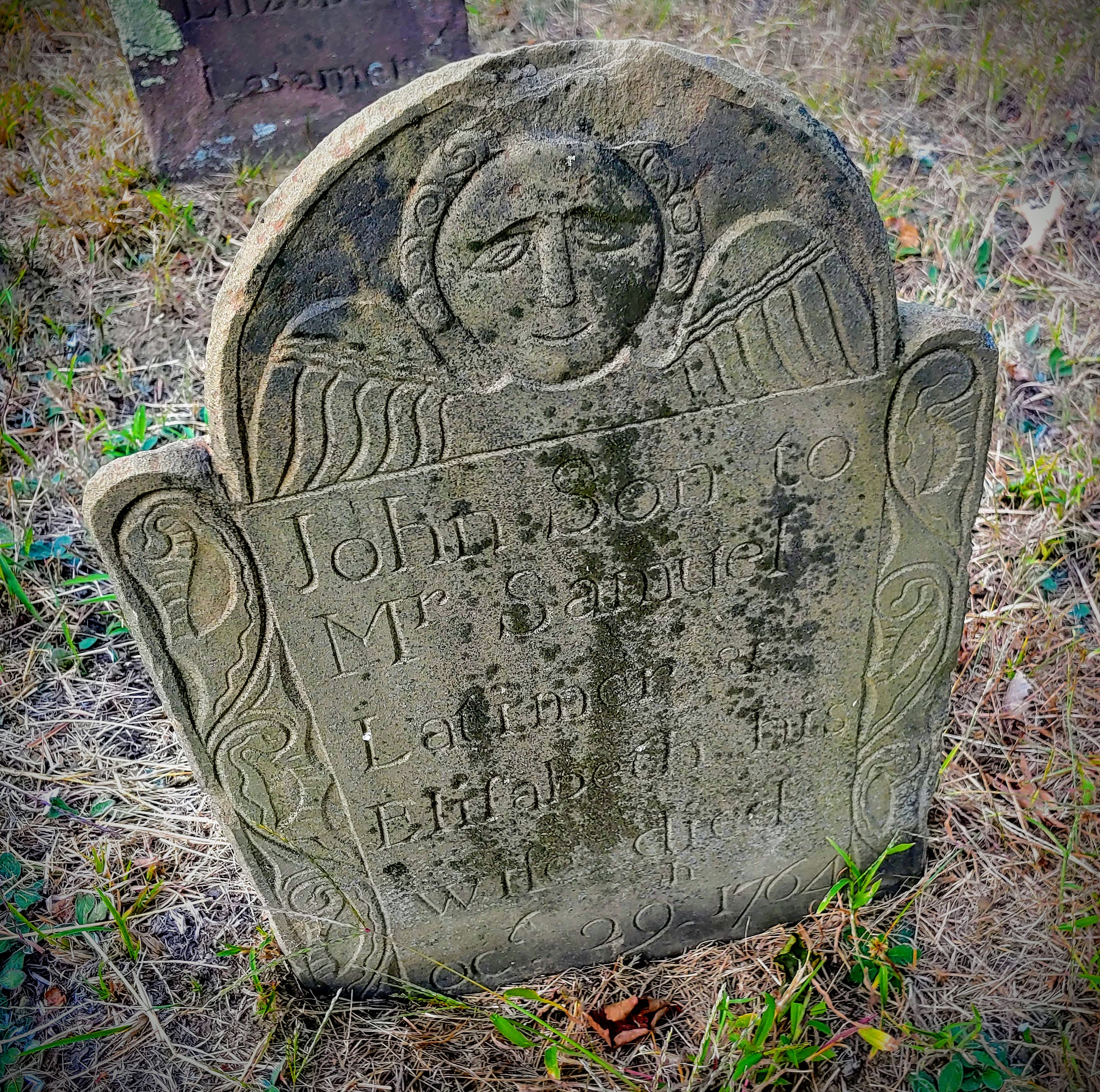
Gravestone dated 1764, carved by David Lamb of Norwich

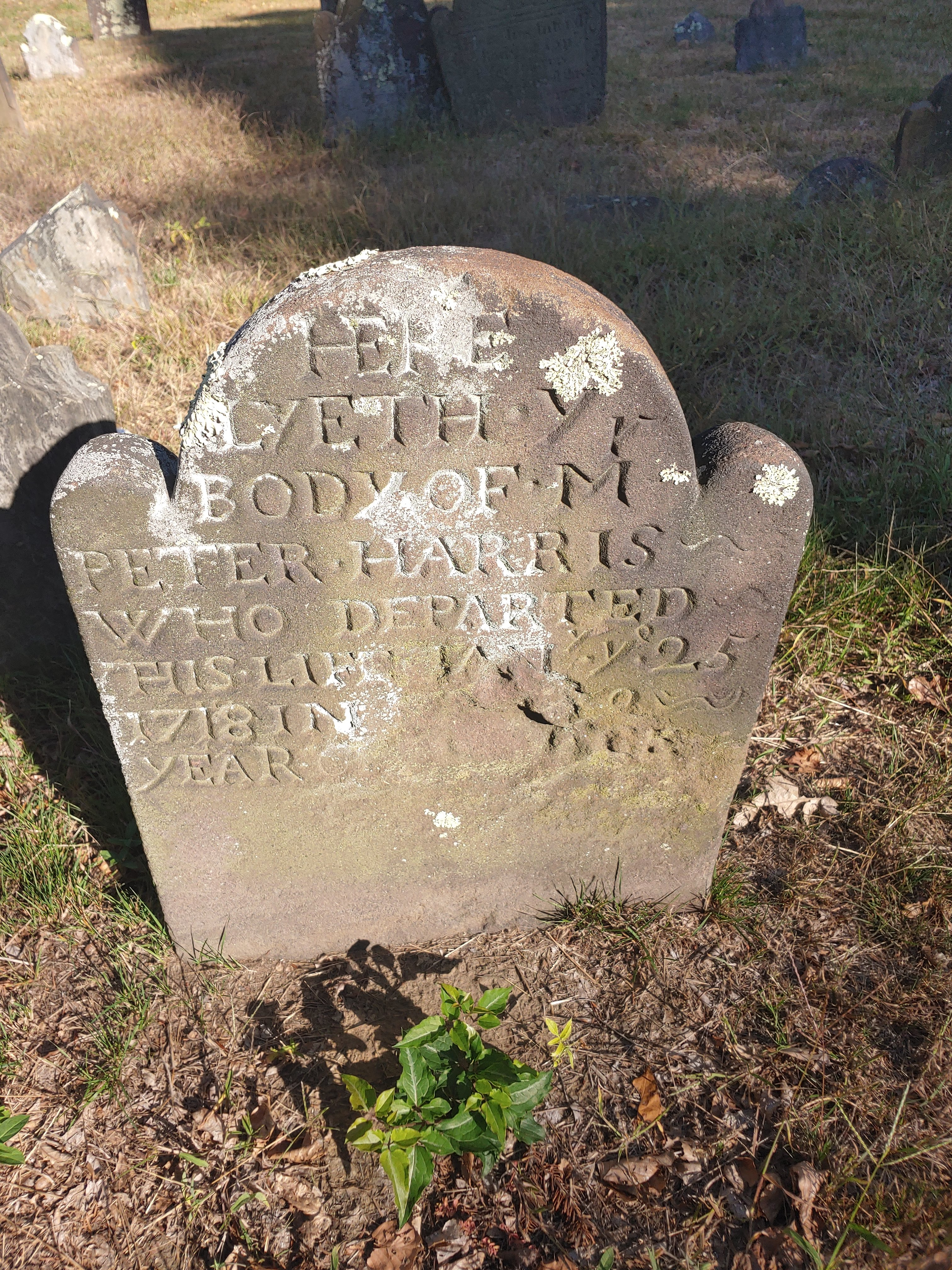
Brownstone gravestone carved by William Stanclift of Portland, dated 1718.

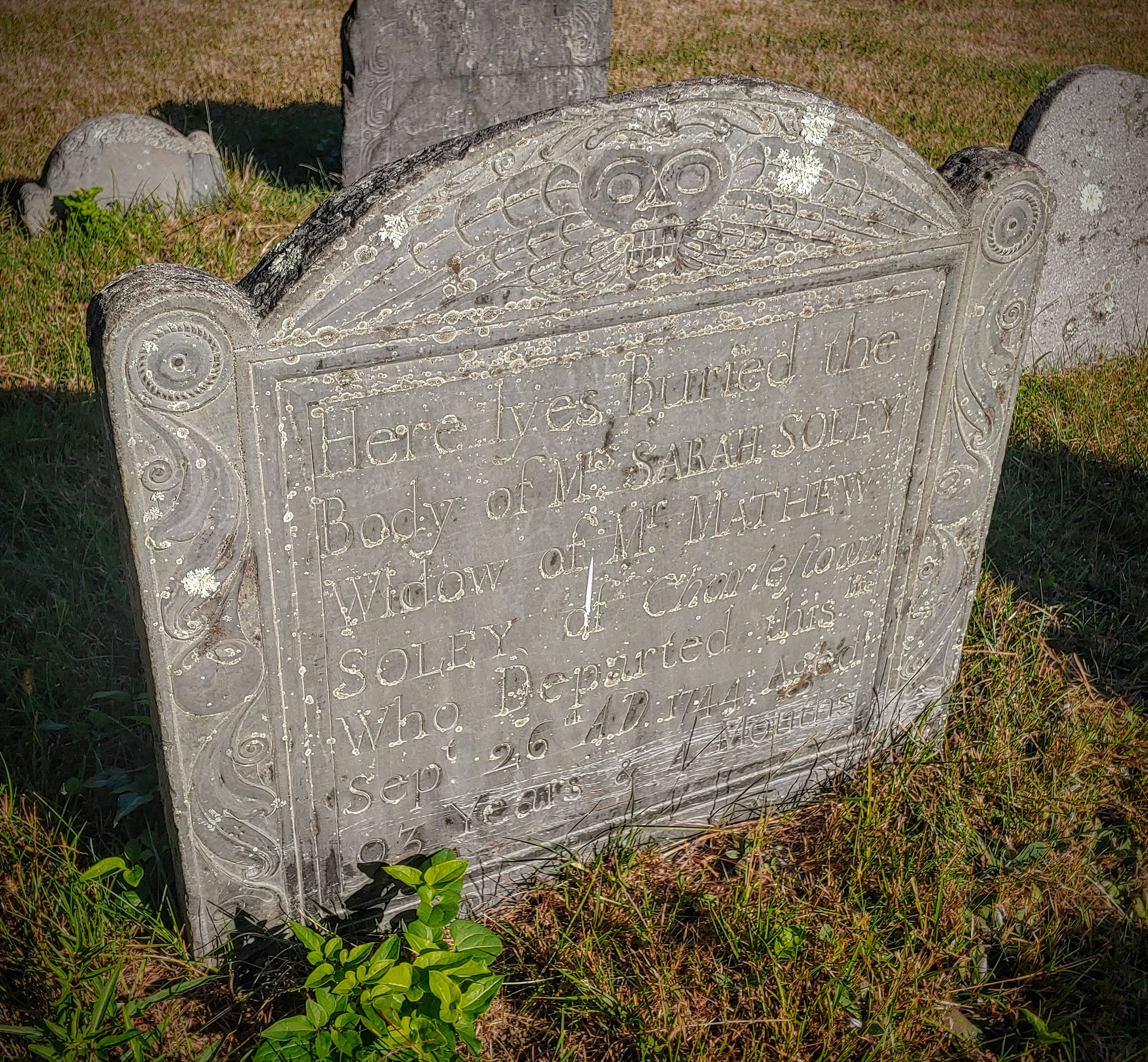
Slate Gravestone carved by Nathaniel Lamson of Charlestown Mass

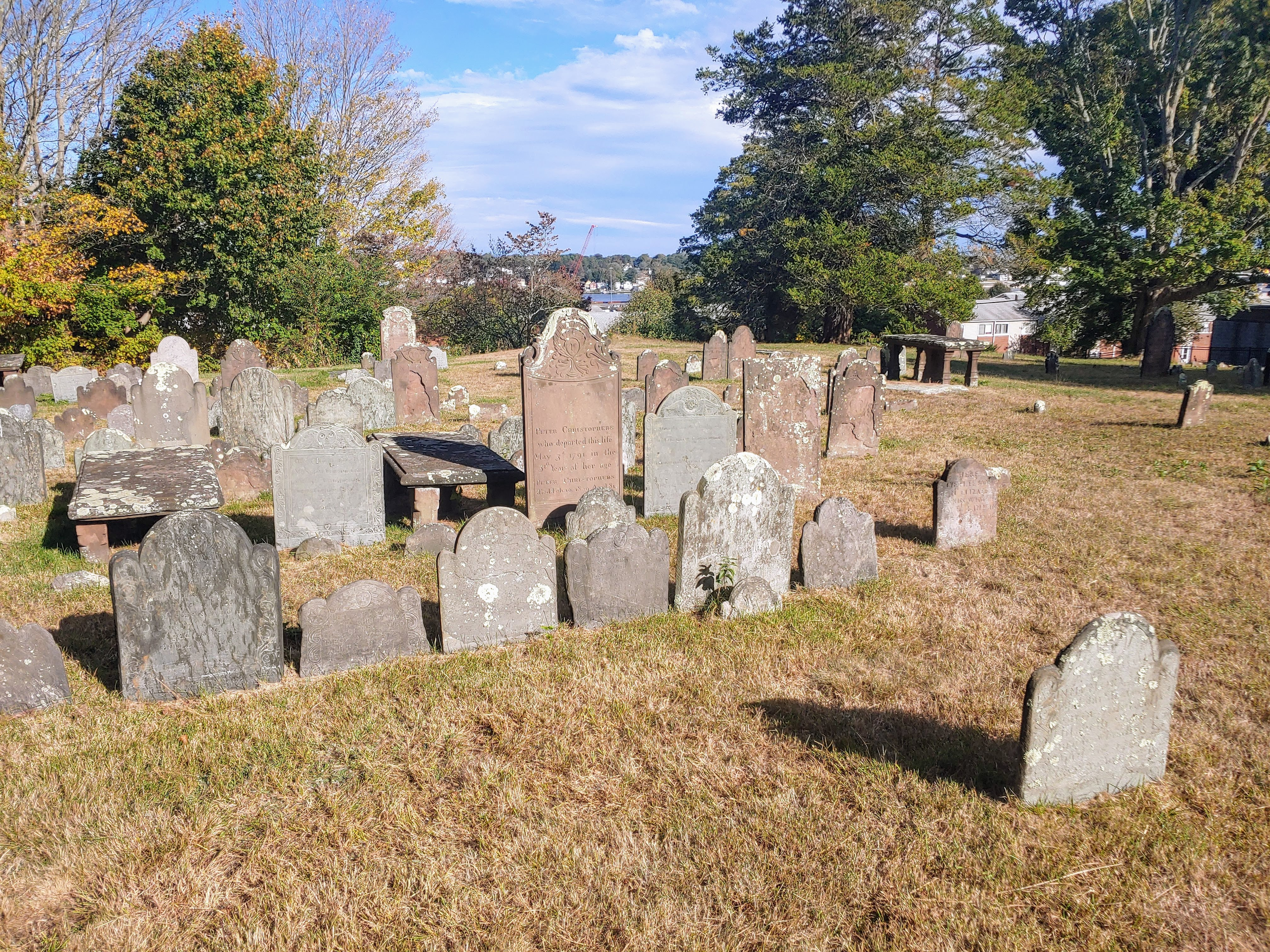
View of the rear part of the Burying Ground.

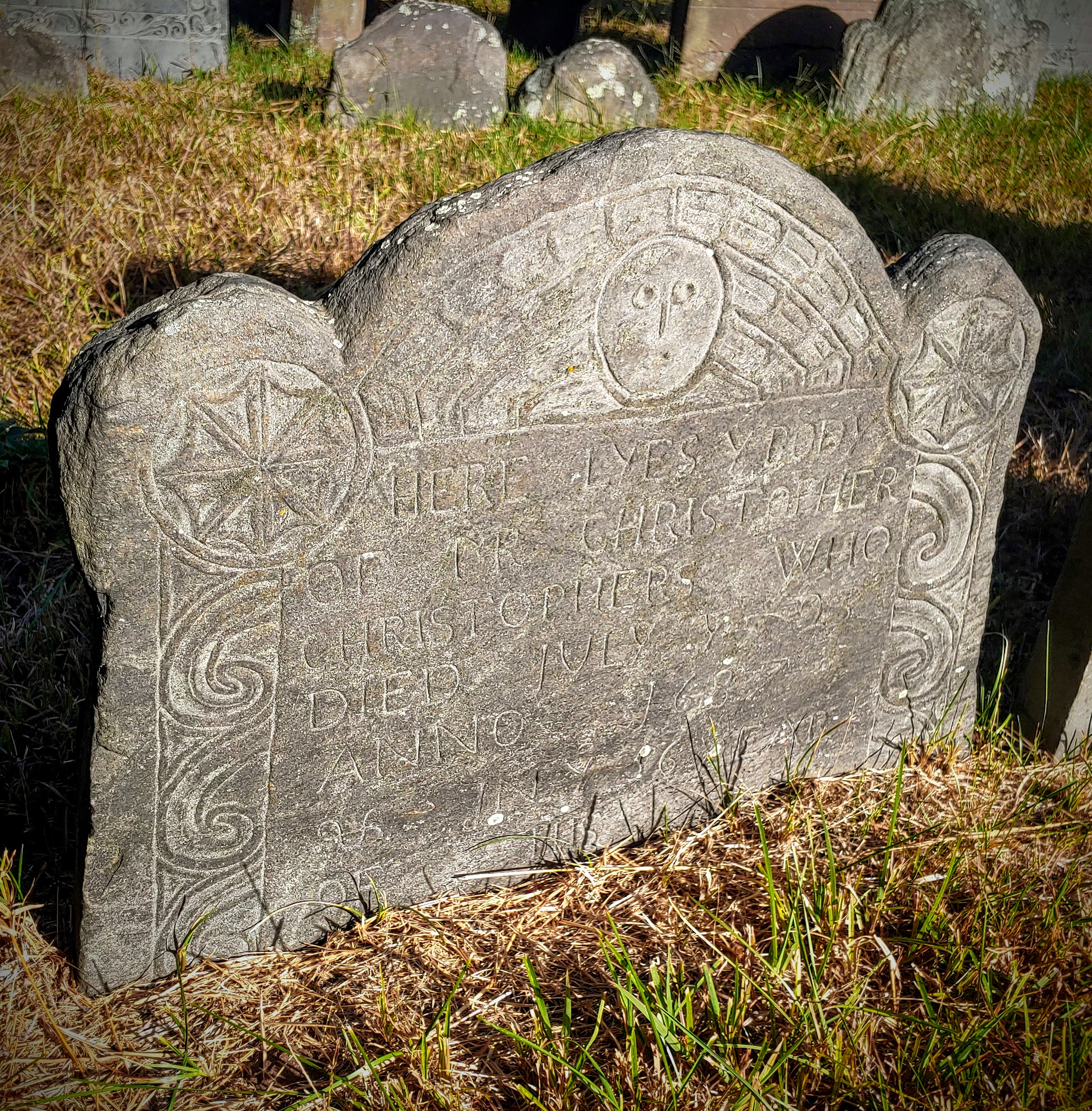
Early schist grave marker carved by John Hartshorne

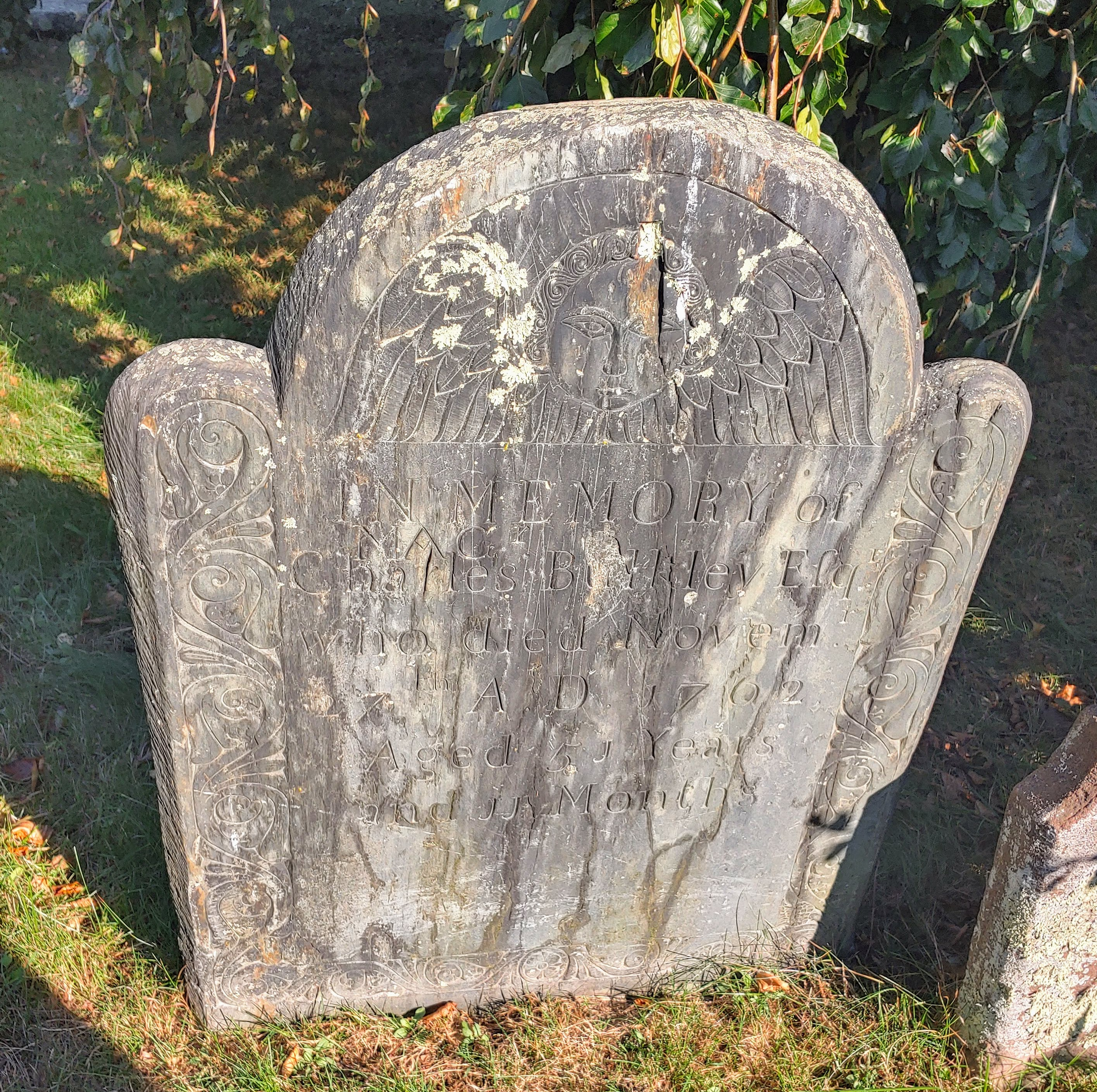
Slate marker carved by the John Stevens Shop of Newport

== See also ==
- New London, Connecticut
