= Judith Dupré =

American writer and historian

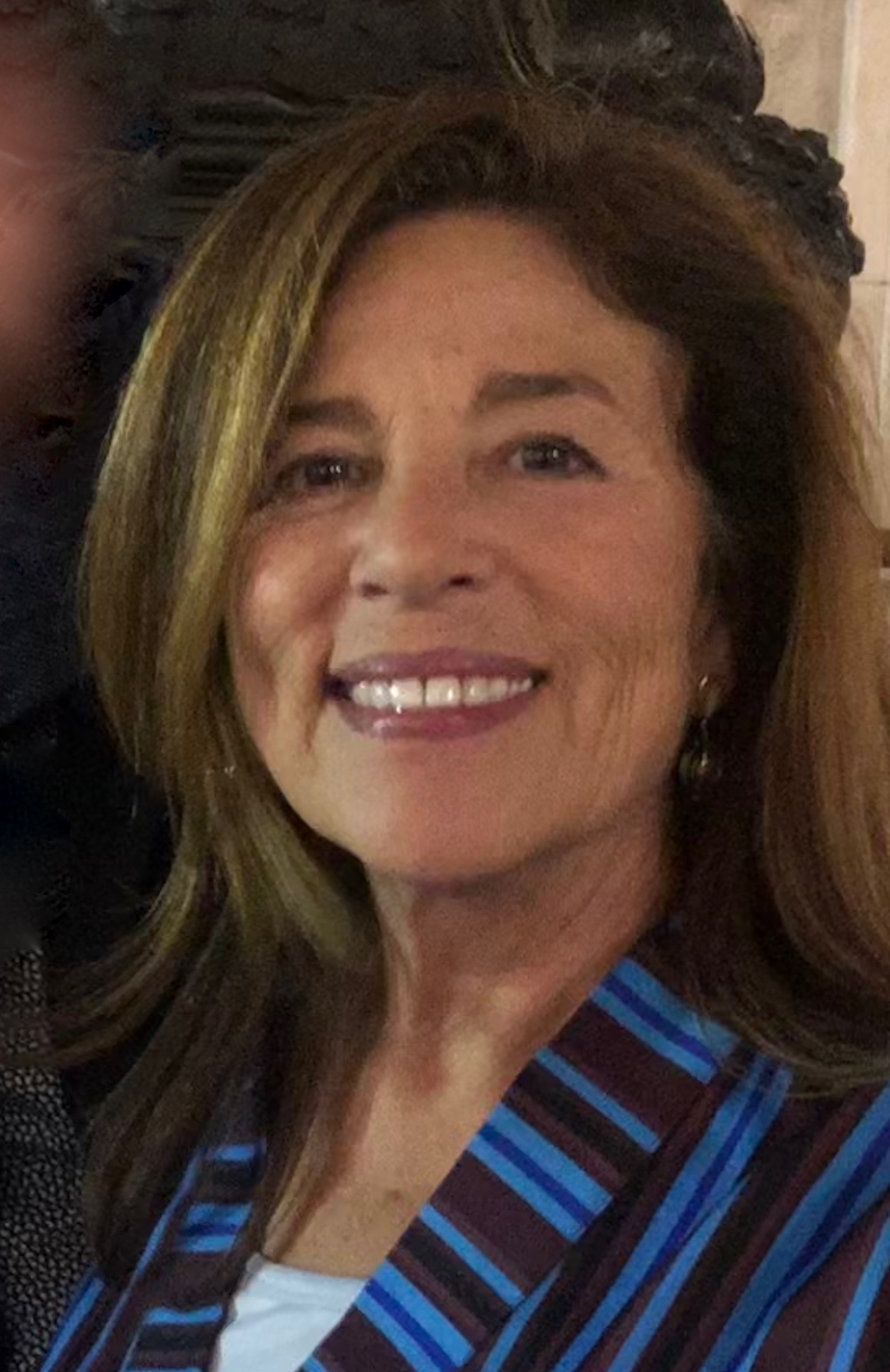
- Born: Providence, Rhode Island, U.S.
- Occupation: Author
- Website: judithdupre.com

Judith Dupré (born in Providence, Rhode Island) is an American writer, structural historian, and public speaker. She is the New York Times bestselling author of several works of narrative nonfiction on art, design, and architecture. She has been described as "a scholar with a novelist's eye for detail and a journalist's easy style."

== Life and career ==
Dupré was born in Providence, Rhode Island into a family of architectural preservationists. She earned a M.Div. from Yale Divinity School in 2011. She is a fellow of Saybrook College at Yale University and a Dominique de Menil scholar at the Institute of Sacred Music, also at Yale. She received her undergraduate degree from Brown University in 1978 and did postgraduate work at Hunter College and the Open Atelier of Design and Architecture, both in New York City.

Dupré serves on the editorial board of Faith & Form, a journal of the American Institute of Architects' Interfaith Forum on Religion, Art and Architecture. She has curated and consulted on numerous contemporary art exhibitions, including an installation of temporary refugee housing on Sterling Quad at Yale Divinity School in 2007. From 1979 through 1990, she curated the Harry N. Abrams Art Collection, an important collection of Pop Art assembled by the art book publisher Harry Abrams.

=== Publications ===
Her books have been translated into fourteen languages. Their unusual shapes and bindings echo their subject matter, and honor the tradition and material presence of the illuminated book. Skyscrapers is 18" high. Bridges is a yard-wide when open, to accommodate its panoramic photos of the longest structures. The cover of Churches is split down the center so that it opens like the doors of a cathedral. The cover of Monuments: America's History in Art and Memory is a replica, in raised relief, of ancient stones; its title lettering was drawn for the book by Nicholas Benson. Page designs include deep-captioned photographs, floating quotations, timelines, and sidebar explorations. The page layouts suggest a kinetic reading experience beyond the turning of successive pages, and have been designed to create individualized reading experiences, where the reader chooses how to engage the array of images, essays and marginal commentaries.

She is the author of the 2016 book titled One World Trade Center: Biography of the Building and official biographer of One World Trade Center. Dupré is the only author given unfettered access to the Trade Center site, team, and archives by The Port Authority of New York & New Jersey. She presents the story of the new World Trade Center in its entirety: from Mayor Rudy Giuliani's vow to rebuild on September 12, 2001, through the complex, often contentious interactions between multiple public and private agencies with a stake in the project, to the placing of One World Trade Center's spire in 2013. The book incorporates over seventy interviews with major participants, including architects David M. Childs, Daniel Libeskind, Santiago Calatrava, and Michael Arad.

== Awards ==
The National Endowment for the Humanities named Dupré an inaugural Public Scholar in 2015. She has received awards and fellowships from Yale University, New York State Council on the Arts, Institute of Museum and Library Services, and the New York Foundation for the Arts. She is a Fellow of the MacDowell Colony, the oldest artists' colony in the U.S. In 2004, the Westchester Arts Council awarded her the Artists Award, the county's highest cultural honor, citing her as a "champion of the arts and literacy."

== Bibliography ==
- One World Trade Center: Biography of the Building (2016). Little, Brown and Company. ISBN 0316336319
- Skyscrapers (2013, 2008, 1997). Black Dog & Leventhal. 2013 ed.: ISBN 978-1-57912-942-2 / 2008 ed: ISBN 1-57912-787-8 / 1996 ed.: ISBN 978-1-884822-45-2
- Bridges: A History of the World's Most Spectacular Spans (2017, 1997). Black Dog & Leventhal. 2017 ed.: ISBN 978-0316507943 / 1997 ed.: ISBN 978-1-884822-75-9
- Churches (2001). HarperCollins. ISBN 0-06-019438-3
- Monuments: America's History in Art and Memory (2007). Random House. ISBN 978-1-4000-6582-0
- Full of Grace: Encountering Mary in Faith, Art and Life (2010). Random House; ISBN 1-4000-6585-2
