= Sarah Kemble Knight =

British teacher and businesswoman (1666 – 1727)

- Born: April 19, 1666; Boston, Massachusetts Bay Colony, British America
- Died: September 25, 1727 (aged 61); Norwich, Connecticut Colony, British America
- Occupations: Teacher; business woman; court scrivener
- Spouse: Richard Knight (d. 1703)
- Children: 1

Signature
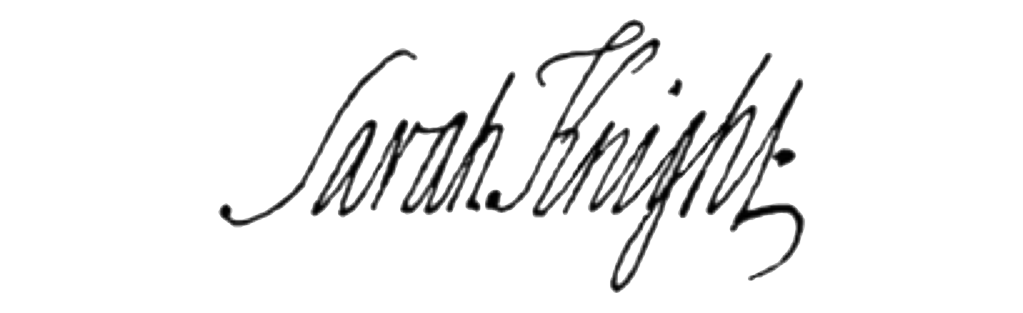

Sarah Kemble Knight (April 19, 1666 – September 25, 1727) was an American teacher and businesswoman, who is remembered for a brief diary of a journey from Boston, Massachusetts Bay Colony, to New York City, Province of New York, in 1704–1705, which provides us with one of the few first-hand-accounts of travel conditions in Connecticut during colonial times.

== Biography ==
Knight was born in Boston to Captain Thomas Kemble, a merchant of Boston, and Elizabeth Trerice. In 1689, she married Richard Knight. They had one child, Elizabeth. Having been left a widow after her husband's death in 1703, Knight assumed the responsibility of managing her household.

When she composed the journal, Knight was a 38-year-old married woman and keeper of a boarding house in Boston with some experience as a copier of legal documents. She was on her way to New Haven (and later to New York City) to act on behalf of a friend in the settlement of her deceased husband's estate. Knight kept a journal of her trip, and it provides us with one of the few first-hand-accounts of travel conditions in Connecticut during colonial times.

== Journey from Boston to New York ==
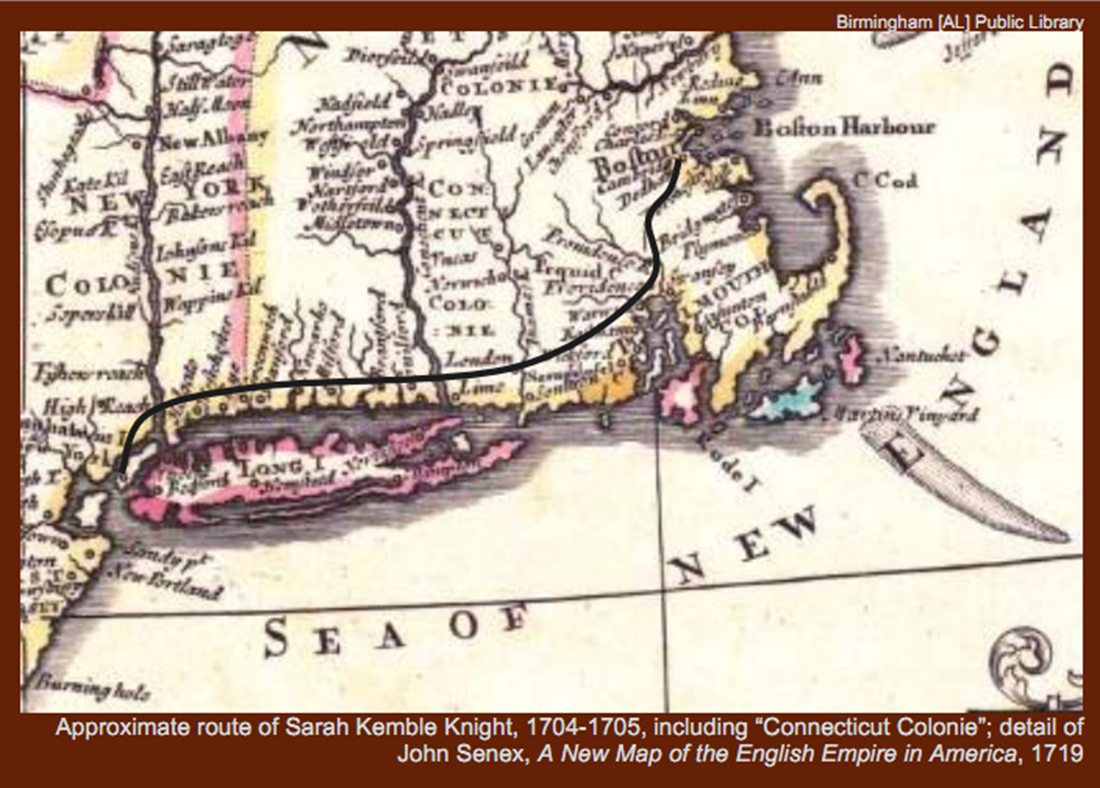
Approximate route of Sarah Kemble Knight's Journey, 1704-1705

Knight chose to travel with a post rider or other reliable guide, so she was never alone on the road. Still, the difficulties she encountered speak volumes about the physical dangers of long-distance travel by horseback in that era. In crossing the Thames River in a ferry boat that carried both passengers and their horses, she wrote in an entry dated “Thirsday, Octobr ye 5th”: “Here, by reason of a very high wind, we met with great difficulty in getting over—the Boat tos’t exceedingly, and our horses capper’d at a very surprising Rate, and set us all in a fright.”

The following day, after traveling for miles over roads that were “very bad, incumbered with rocks and mountainous passages,” Sarah Knight came to “a bridge under which the river ran very swift, my horse stumbled, and very narrowly escaped falling into the water, which extremely frightened me.”

As for room and board, Sarah Knight spent an evening with the Congregationalist minister in New London, “where I was very handsomely and plentifully treated and Lodg’d.” The minister, she noted, was “the most affable, courteous, Genero’s and best of men.”

Such experiences, however, were offset by others less wholesome. In Saybrook, where Madam Knight stopped for a mid-day dinner, she complained of the landlady: “Shee told us shee had some mutton wch shee would broil, wch I was glad to hear; […] but it being pickled and my Guide said it smelt strong of head sause, we left it, and pd sixpence apiece for our Dinners, wch was only smell.”

Further on, at a public house in Fairfield, Ms. Knight was likewise unable to eat the meal prepared for her and went to bed supperless. On being shown to her room, “a little Lento Chamber furnisht amongst other Rubbish with a High Bedd and a Low one […] down I laid my poor Carkes (never more tired) and found my Covering as scanty as my Bed was hard.”

Before crossing a particularly hazardous river, Knight cannot rid herself of thoughts of drowning, writing, "The concern of mind this relation sett me in: no thoughts but those of the dang'ros River could entertain my Imagination, and they were as formidable as varios, still Tormenting me with blackest Ideas of my Approaching fate–Sometimes seeing my self drowning, otherwhiles drowned, and at the best like a holy Sister just come out of a Spiritual Bath in dripping Garments." This is not the last danger water presents during Knight's journey. Near the end of the journey, she has a rather close call when she writes, "But in going over the Causeway at Dedham the Bridge being overflowed by the high waters coming down I very narrowly escaped falling over into the river Hors and all wch twas almost a miracle I did not." In addition to the danger posed by the rivers, Knight writes about the less than ideal roads on which she must travel. She explains in her straightforward manner that "[t]he Rodes all along this way are very bad, Incumbred with Rocks and mountainos passages, wch were very disagreeable to my tired carcass." These examples provide just a sampling of the dangers faced by Knight on her journey as chronicled in her journal.

Knight persevered and after six days on the road arrived in New Haven, where she visited with relatives before resuming her trip to New York, which took an additional three days of hard travel.

=== Journal ===
She recounted her experiences during the five-month journey in the “journals” that have made her known to students of American colonial literature and history. The small diary of her Boston–New York journey passed into private hands and lay undiscovered until 1825 when it was published posthumously as The Journal of Mme Knight by Theodore Dwight. The Journal of Madam Knight has subsequently been reprinted by others with additional biographical information.

Her journal remains noteworthy both for its larger-than-life central character (Knight) and its telling of a trying journey not normally undertaken by a woman. The discomforts of primitive traveling are described with much sprightliness and not a little humor, including poems of gratitude and relief about finding moonlight, and poems of frustration about the loud sounds of drunken men late at night. The journal is valuable as a history of the manners and customs of the time, and is full of graphic descriptions of the early settlements in New England and New York. At the same time, it is interesting for its original orthography and interspersed rhymes.

==== Relevance and reception ====
Since its publication, The Journal of Madam Knight has been valued as both an historical and literary document. As a travel narrative, it recounts the dangerous and primitive conditions of travel in the colonies at this time period. Furthermore, Knight's detailed descriptions of New York, New Haven, and the many small settlements she travels through across Connecticut, shed light on colonial life at the turn of the 18th century. She documents eating habits, architecture, religious diversity, and various fashions of the people of New York and New Haven, as well as the living conditions found in rural settlements between Boston and New York.

Knight's diary has also been important in the field of women's history and literary recovery, both of which are movements that seek to recover narratives often forgotten or neglected in favor of more mainstream, canonized works. As a woman's diary, The Journal of Madam Knight represents a deviation from the traditional masculine canon. While her status as a feminist figure remains open for debate, Knight's diary has merited study for its record of an unusual situation (a woman traveling alone through the New England wilderness); for its uncharacteristically outward focus (as opposed to the typical, inwardly reflective, Puritan diary); and for the unique judgements and strong personality contained within it.

While many critics and scholars have praised Knight's Journal as an historical account, some scholars, such as Robert O. Stephens, believe it should also be read as an imaginative and creative work. Stephens asserts that "By recognizing the mythic implications of Madam Knight's Journal, even at the expense of its mimetic and outwardly historical impact, we are able to place the work more clearly in the fruitful tradition of colonial American, and particularly New England, literature...Identification of the individual mythic allusions is only a matter of reading, but seeing the tantalizing pattern they fall into is an indication that this innocent and rough-mannered journal has meanings that a literal reading cannot guess at." By reading the Journal as a mythical account, Stephens hopes to align Knight's work with the narrative style of Nathaniel Hawthorne.

==== Structure ====
Knight's journal is largely a ledger of the places and people she encountered during each day of her trip. The extended scenes highlight remarkable or memorable interactions, usually with people that Knight has strong opinions about.

For example, early in the journal, crosses a swamp with a man she sarcastically describes as "honest John." She recounts of how he embellishes the stories of his adventures to appear to her as "a Prince disguis'd." Upon reaching the next stop, Knight is confronted with this man's eldest daughter, who interrogates her with "silly questions" referring to the unusualness of a woman being on such a journey, to which Knight responds curtly, calling her rude. These instances of hyperbole and character judgment contrast with other, apparently less remarkable interactions, such as the following account of a transaction between two postmen (one of which was her guide), in which she does not even name her guide: "About 8 in the morning, I with the Post proceeded forward without observing any thing remarkable; And about two, on, Arrived at the Post's second stage, where the western Post mett him and exchanged Letters." This account, however, is immediately followed by a detailed description of a meal Knight was served, which appears to have been notable for its unpleasant appearance and aftermath. Extended scenes describing Knight's unpleasant encounters with food occur often throughout her journal.

Some moments during the journey appear to have had a profound impact on Knight. These experiences are marked by distinct poetic interludes in her journal, in which she abandons the conventions of prose and resorts to metrical composition. In one instance, Knight finds herself riding her horse in the pitch-dark woods alone late at night. She feels intensely fearful until the moon reveals itself and lights her way, after which she experiences a transcendental sense of relief and gratitude toward the moon. She unpacks this tightly bound moment with the following solvent prose:

Fair Cynthia, all the Homage that I may
Unto a Creature, unto thee I pay;
In Lonesome woods to meet so kind a guide,
To Mee's more worth than all the world beside.
Some Joy I felt just now, when safe got or'e
Yon Surly River to this Rugged shore,
Deeming Rough welcomes from these clownish Trees,
Better than Lodgings with Nereidees.
Yet swelling fears surprise; all dark appears–
Nothing but Light can dissipate those fears.
My fainting vitals can't lend strength to say,
But softly whisper, O I wish 'twere day.
The murmer hardly warma the Ambient air,
E' re thy Bright Aspect rescues from despair:
Makes the old Hagg her sable mantle loose,
And a Bright joy do's through my Soul diffuse.
The Boistero's Trees now Lend a Passage Free,
And pleasant prospects thou giv'st light to see.

Later, she encounters a very poor family, for whom she seemingly pretends to have an overwhelming sense of empathy (a convention of verse at the time). She draws out the emotional nuances of this vision as follows:

Tho' Ill at éase, A stranger and alone,
All my fatigues shall not extort a grone.
These Indigents have hunger wth their ease;
Their best is worn behalfe then my disease.
Their Misirable butt wch Heat and Cold
Alternately without Repulse do hold;
Their Lodgings thyn and hard, their Indian fare
The mean Apparel which the wretches wear,
And their ten thousand ills wch can't be told,
Makes nature er'e 'tis middle age'd look old.
When I reflect, my late fatigues do seem
Only a notion or forgotten Dreem.

Although written as a journal and despite her occasional poetic flights, Knight's writing is primarily focused outward, concerned with taking inner stock of her external surroundings as she travels both inwardly and outwardly. In one instance, she notes that some of her experiences and stories are "not proper to be Related by a Female pen," suggesting that even though she wrote privately, Knight was aware of the possibility her work might be read by an external party. However she made no effort to publish and seems to have forgotten to have the journal destroyed before she died, as was common at the time.

==== Danger, courage, and determination ====
Knight's journey was a difficult one for a woman of her station, and both the perils and her courage and recklessness throughout the journey are illustrated in multiple moments throughout her journal. Knight's knowledge of business and determination is apparent early in her account of her journey when she writes about an exchange concerning payment for an escort. She tells the woman attempting to get more money from her simply that she “would not be accessary to such extortion.” In the end, Knight stands her ground and is able to bypass the negotiator, deal directly with the would-be escort, and arrange a price she feels is fair. Knight must traverse some rather dangerous landscapes unfamiliar to her. Along the way, Knight may seem to feel fear or apprehension.

==== Humor ====
Despite the hardships of her journey, Knight infused humor into her journal as she traveled. In addition, many scholars of American Literature cite Knight's picaresque characterizations and her satirical tendencies as reasons to consider her an early precursor to "the sort of broad humor and characterization that would be typical of later American writers," such as Mark Twain.

==== Racism and class concerns ====
Sarah Kemble Knight was a complex human being with early American racial and class sensibilities. Knight refers to racial interactions between slaves and whites with white supremacist's observations: "But too Indulgent (especially ye farmers) to their slaves: suffering too great familiarity from them, permitting ym to sit at Table and eat with them, (as they say to save time,) and into the dish goes the black hoof as freely as the white hand." Knight also demonstrates racist judgment of Native Americans: "There are every where in the Towns as I passed, a Number of Indians the Natives of the Country, and are the most salvage of all the salvages of that kind that I had ever Seen: little or no care taken (as I heard upon enquiry) to make them otherwise."

Knight comments that a certain country gentleman is animal-like and uncouth. She says that country people, like cows, "seldom Loose their Cudd." She also describes the previously mentioned country gentleman as "spitting a Large deal of Aromatick Tincture, he gave a scrape with his shovel like shoo, leaving a small shovel full of dirt on the floor, made a full stop, Hugging his own pretty Body with his hands under his arms, Stood staring rown'd him, like a Catt let out of a Baskett." Clearly, Knight's account of the strangers she met on her journey would conflict with more modern understandings of how we should treat our fellow human beings. However, as an early American writer, Knight's writings offer scholars a view into the controversial complexities of 18th-century life.

== Later life ==
In 1706 she opened a boarding house and taught school, which gained some reputation in Boston. She is described as “excelling in the art of teaching composition.” In 1713, Knight's daughter married John Livingston, of Connecticut, and the son of Robert Livingston the Elder, and Madam Knight moved with them to New London, where she continued her business and land dealings. Madam Knight, as she was generally called as a mark of respect, spent the rest of her life either in New London or Norwich, Connecticut. She owned several farms in New London, and had a home in Norwich. She ran an inn out of the Livingston farm in New London.

In the widowed years of her life, Sarah Kemble Knight left Boston for good and moved to New London to live near her married daughter. There, she owned a tavern and an inn, engaged in the buying and selling of land for speculation and became a respected member of her church. Sarah Kemble Knight died at age 62 and is buried in New London at Ye Antientist Burial Ground, New London.
