= John Benson (artisan) =

American artisan and artist (1939–2024)

John Everett Benson
- Carving words on stone at the Franklin Delano Roosevelt Memorial in Washington, D.C.
- Born: October 8,1939; Newport, Rhode Island, U.S.
- Died: June 13 2024 ( aged 84 ) Newport, Rhode Island, U.S.
- Education: Rhode Island School of Design
- Known for: Stone carving, calligraphy, type design, sculpture
- Notable work: John F. Kennedy Eternal Flame; National Gallery of Art; Franklin D. Roosevelt Memorial; Vietnam Memorial; Civil Rights Memorial
- Spouse: Karen Augeri (m. 1988)
- Father: John Howard Benson
- Family: Christopher, Nicholas
- Awards: Frederic W. Goudy Award; 2019
- Website: www.johnstevensshop.com

John Everett Benson (October 8, 1939 – June 13, 2024), known as Fud, was an American calligrapher, stonecarver, typeface designer and sculptor who created inscriptions for monuments including the John F. Kennedy memorial at Arlington National Cemetery, the National Gallery of Art, the Franklin Delano Roosevelt Memorial, and the Vietnam Memorial in Washington, DC.

== Life and work ==
John Everett Benson was born in Newport, Rhode Island, in 1939. His mother, Esther Fisher Smith Benson, spoke using the archaic pronouns of Quaker "plain speech." Benson began working for his father, John Howard Benson, at the age of fifteen at The John Stevens Shop, which his father had purchased. He studied sculpture at Rhode Island School of Design. He specialized in Roman lettering. In 1964, Benson and John Hegnauer were commissioned to design and carve the inscriptions on the John F. Kennedy memorial at Arlington National Cemetery. In Rhode Island, Benson carved a number of inscriptions at the University of Rhode Island's Robert L. Carothers Library and Learning Commons.

His mallet was engraved with BY HAMMER& HAND after the old craftmans proverb "By hammer and hand do all things stand".

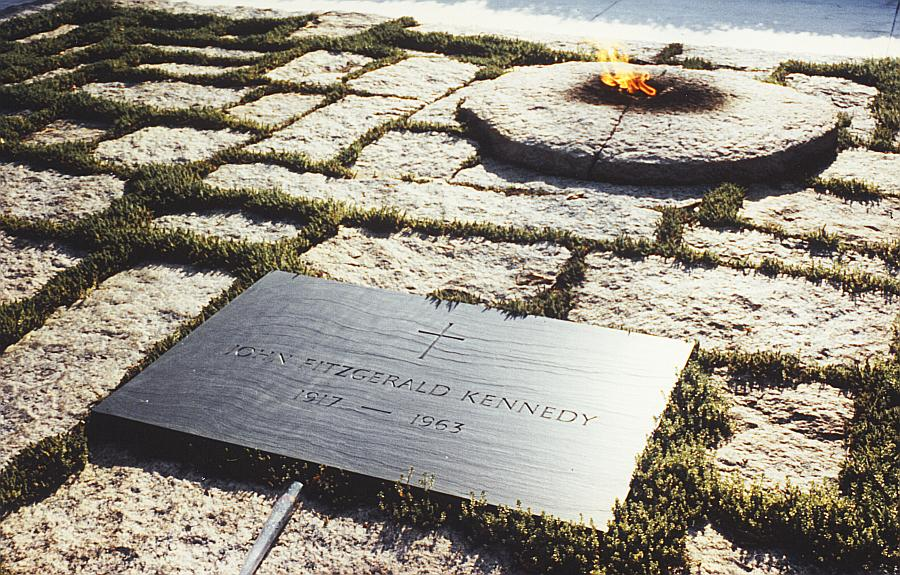
Hand-carved gravestone at Kennedy memorial, Arlington National Cemetery

He designed and carved gravestones for Tennessee Williams, Lillian Hellman, Rachel Lambert Mellon and George Balanchine.

Benson created monumental architectural inscriptions for famous buildings such as the Prudential Center in Boston, the National Gallery of Art, the Dallas Museum of Art, Rockefeller Center, Chicago Mercantile Exchange Center, the Armand Hammer Museum of Art in Los Angeles and the Boston Public Library. He lettered the date stones of the Vietnam Memorial in Washington, DC, the Civil Rights Memorial in Montgomery, Alabama, the Franklin Delano Roosevelt Memorial in Washington, DC, and the Federal Courthouse in Boston. He designed the National Geographic Society headquarters lintel, West Point's MacArthur Monument, and the reverse of a medal for the National Gallery of Art.

He drew various photo-typefaces for architectural applications and a titling typeface, called Aardvark, for The Font Bureau in Boston, Alexa, Balzano, and Caliban.

In 1993, he left the direction of The John Stevens Shop to his son, Nicholas "Nick" Benson and returned to sculpting full-time.

Latterly Benson was doing portrait and figurative work in clay and bronze at his studio in Newport, Rhode Island. He died in Newport on June 13, 2024, at the age of 85.

== Awards ==
- Frederic W. Goudy Award, 2019
