= Wyman Westberry =

American businessman, conservationist, union activist

Wyman Westberry (born May 25, 1941) is an American businessman, conservationist, and United States Army veteran, who came to public attention in the 1970s when he raised concerns about the Gilman Paper Company's corporate practices related to environmental pollution, tax evasion, and political corruption. He subsequently provided testimony and materials to federal law enforcement, and his revelations were instrumental in multiple government investigations and federal suit against Gilman Paper Company (United States of America, Plaintiff-appellee, v. George W. Brumley, Sr., Robert W. Harrison, and William Thomas, Defendants-appellants, 560 F.2d 1268). His successful lawsuit was a key case in Georgia highlighting wider concerns about oversight and small-town vulnerability to the unchecked power of private corporations. It is the subject of James Fallows and Ralph Nader's publication, The Water Lords. Westberry is also one of the subjects of Fallows' More Like Us and national bestseller, Our Towns: A 100,000-Mile Journey into the Heart of America. Former United States Senate Press Secretary Stephan Lesher chronicled the events in Media Unbound: The Impact of Television Journalism on the Public.

== Early life ==
Born on May 25, 1941, in Wayne County, Georgia, Westberry was the sixth of ten children. He graduated from Wayne County High School and attended college in Savannah, Georgia and the City College of New York (CCNY – also part of the City University of New York), prior to being drafted to the U.S. Army to serve as an engineer. After his career in the army, he relocated to St. Marys, Georgia, where he worked as a millwright at Gilman Paper Company, the largest privately held paper company in the United States. Westberry was later elected as president of the labor union.

== Gilman Paper Company litigation ==
In 1970, members of Ralph Nader's "Nader's Raiders" were located in the nearby city of Savannah conducting the study regarding the influence of large companies on pollution, tax evasion, and economic peonage of surrounding areas. Westberry contacted the project's members to bring attention to the 18 million gallons of wastewater that Gilman Paper Company generated daily and discharged into the St. Marys River without treatment. He also voiced concerns regarding the mill's social and political influence, which he felt resulted in the civil right infringement of the residents of St. Marys and employees of the mill.

Those employed by Gilman Paper Company included local politicians, such as the City of St. Marys mayor Richard Daly and Georgia State Representative Robert W. Harrison. Harrison also served as the attorney for the St. Marys mill; the attorney for the surrounding cities of St. Marys, Kingsland, and Folkston; the attorney for the local school board and the hospital authority; and the attorney for Camden and Charlton Counties. At its peak, the mill's executive vice president and general manager, George W. Brumley, reported that Gilman Paper Company was the only major Georgia industry south of Brunswick and east of Waycross, estimating 75 percent of the economy of Camden County to be directly dependent on Gilman Paper Company. According to Nader associate and journalist James Fallows:

The result was a climate of suspicion and fear. Wyman Westberry drew all the shades in his house before he would talk with us – and this was a marvel of courage. Another man would talk with outside visitors only after he had turned out every light and waited for the visitors to creep into his dark and apparently vacant house. Most others would not consider talking at all.

Following his contact with Nader's Raiders, Westberry provided internal documents and a series of detailed interviews to journalists. In March 1970, he was fired from Gilman Paper Company.

=== Georgia's Democratic Primary of 1970 ===
After his termination, Westberry encouraged his friend and local physician, Carl Drury, to run for the office of state representative from the 66th District, which included Camden, Brantley, and Charlton counties. Since 1965, the position had been held by Gilman Paper Company's vice president and attorney Robert Harrison. Using leaked documents provided by Westberry, Drury's campaign became a vocal critic of Harrison's involvement with Gilman Paper Company and received statewide attention.

After winning the election, state representative Drury requested investigation of Gilman Paper Company's affairs, ranging from taxes to pollution control. The director of the Georgia Watershed Protection Branch ordered Gilman Paper Company to adhere to strict anti-pollution efforts. The Georgia attorney general ruled that the tax arrangement between Gilman Paper Company and St. Marys was unconstitutional. The legislature passed a law requiring cities to use the county tax valuations, which must be approved by the state, triggering an exponential increase in Gilman Paper Company's annual taxes. A federal grand jury was convened to investigate irregularities in the county's politics.

=== Fallout ===
In the spring of 1972, Westberry disclosed his identity as the whistleblower in Harper's Magazine article, Democracy and the Good Life in a Company Town. Newsweek and The Washington Post also published articles chronicling Westberry's activities in St. Marys, in addition to several regional and statewide publications. Later that spring, Mike Wallace and the film crew of CBS Evening News 60 Minutes visited St. Marys to interview Gilman Paper Company's executive vice president and general manager, George Brumley, and report on the allegations waged by Westberry and Drury.

With national publicity and activity in the state legislature at its peak, Gilman Paper Company supervisor, William (Tommy) Thomas, offered his fellow mill employee, Lawrence Brown, $50,000 to kill Westberry. According to his later testimony, Brown never intended to follow-through with the contract, but instead warned Westberry of the solicitation. The FBI and the Georgia Bureau of Investigation provided Brown with covert listening devices to record his conversations with Gilman Paper Company's supervisor Thomas, manager Brumley, and attorney Harrison. On the evidence gathered, a federal grand jury convened to take testimony about the murder plot in May 1972.

On October 15, 1975, the United States grand jury, sitting at Savannah, indicted George W. Brumley, Vice President and resident manager of the Gilman Paper Company at St. Marys, Georgia; Robert W. Harrison, longtime attorney, former legislator, and local counsel for Gilman Paper Company; and William (Tommy) Thomas, an employee of Gilman. A nine-day jury trial resulted in the conviction of all three defendants on all pending counts, including conspiracy to commit murder. Also in 1975, 13 employees of Gilman Paper Company successfully sued the company regarding pollution-control equipment.

== Subsequent career ==
In the 1980s, Westberry established Mom & Pop Stores, Inc. In 1992, he founded ATN, Inc. He serves as chairman of the board of ATN, Inc. and AmTel, Inc. Both companies have been subject to criticism by Prison Rights Movement organizations, such as the Prison Policy Initiative.

== Personal life ==
Westberry has remained a resident of St. Marys, Georgia. He has one daughter, Alexandra Westberry.
