= Alexa (typeface) =

- Category: Script
- Designer: John Benson
- Foundry: Adobe Systems
- Date created: 1995
- Sample

Alexa is a typeface. It was designed for Adobe Systems in 1995 by John Benson, a United States carver of inscriptions, including those at the John F. Kennedy Memorial in Arlington National Cemetery. Benson modeled the friendly, casual script after his own handwriting and named it after his niece. Although based on the cancelleresca style of 16th-century Italian writing masters, Alexa has no swash terminals or ligatures. The absence of these features and its pronounced slope give this typeface a distinctly modern look for lively lines and pages. One can use Alexa for both text and display sizes.
