= Richard Benson (photographer) =

American photographer and printer

Richard Mead Atwater Benson
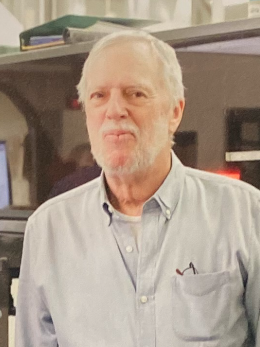
- Born: Richard Mead Atwater Benson; November 8, 1943; Newport, Rhode Island, U.S.
- Died: June 22, 2017 (aged 73); Providence, Rhode Island, U.S.
- Other name: Chip (nickname)
- Education: Brown University
- Occupation: Photographer

Richard Mead Atwater Benson (November 8, 1943 – June 22, 2017) was an American photographer, printer, and educator who used photographic processing techniques of the past and present.

"He is perhaps best known for his innovations in photographic offset printing techniques and, later, ink-jet printing."

Benson was awarded two Guggenheim Fellowships and a MacArthur Fellowship. His work is held in the collections of Los Angeles County Museum of Art, Metropolitan Museum of Art, San Francisco Museum of Modern Art and Whitney Museum of American Art.

== Biography ==
Born in Newport, Rhode Island, Benson attended the St. George's School, then spent three months at Brown University before dropping out and joining the United States Navy. He learned about lenses and optics in his time in the navy. He then worked as a printer, primarily in printing photographs, first in Connecticut and then in Newport.

Benson began teaching photography at Yale University in 1979 and was dean of the Yale School of Art from 1996 to 2006. Benson had a broad range of interests in the photographic print: aluminum, silver, platinum, palladium, and ink. Working in these different mediums, sometimes learning forgotten crafts and sometimes creating new ones, by the 1970s he was convinced that ink and the modern photo offset press—with its ability to make multiple passes that build an image from multiple layers of ink—possessed a potential for photographic rendition beyond anything else previously known. By the 1990s he began working on the relationship between the computer and traditional photographic imagery, and applied the lessons from this in the production of long-run offset books of work by different photographers, in both black and white and color.

He was the uncle of stone carver Nicholas Benson, the owner of The John Stevens Shop. Nick Benson was named a MacArthur Fellow in 2010, making the Bensons one of two families with multiple MacArthur fellows.

== Publications ==
- Lay This Laurel. Eakins, 1973. Co-authored with Lincoln Kirstein. ISBN 978-0871300362.
- Photographs from the Collection of the Gilman Paper Company. White Oak, 1985. OCLC 14377747. With acknowledgements by Howard Gilman, an introduction by Pierre Apraxine, notes to the plates by Lee Marks and an afterword by Benson. Benson made multiple halftone films from each photograph, exposed those films to plates, and printed the plates on a single-color sheet-fed offset printing press.
- A Maritime Album: 100 Photographs and Their Stories. Newport News, Virginia: Mariners' Museum; Yale University Press, 1997. Co-authored with John Szarkowski. ISBN 9780300073423.
- A Yale Album: The Third Century. A Yale Tercentennial Book. Yale University Press, 2001. ISBN 978-0300087239.
- The Printed Picture. Museum of Modern Art, 2008. ISBN 978-0870707216. Exhibition catalog of an eponymous 2008–2009 exhibition at MoMA, co-curated with Peter Galassi.

== Awards ==
=== Honors and awards given to him ===
- 1978: Guggenheim Fellowship, John Simon Guggenheim Memorial Foundation
- 1981: National Endowment for the Arts Photography Fellowship
- 1986: MacArthur Fellowship, MacArthur Foundation
- 1986: Guggenheim Fellowship, John Simon Guggenheim Memorial Foundation
- Two National Endowment for the Arts publication grants, Federal government of the United States
- Rhode Island Governor's Medal for the Arts

=== Honors and awards in honor of him ===
- Richard Benson Prize, Yale School of Art: annual prize awarded for leadership in the photography program

== Collections ==
Benson's work is held in the following permanent collections:

- Los Angeles County Museum of Art, Los Angeles, CA: 3 prints (as of March 2019)
- Metropolitan Museum of Art, New York: 70 prints (as of March 2019)
- Museum of Modern Art, New York: 21 prints (as of March 2019)
- San Francisco Museum of Modern Art, San Francisco, CA: 11 prints (as of March 2019)
- Whitney Museum of American Art, New York: 8 prints (as of March 2019)
