= Gilman & Gonzalez-Falla Theatre Foundation =

Giver of awards to new song & book writers

Gilman & Gonzalez-Falla Theatre Foundation give awards to new songwriters and book writers. The foundation was created by American Theatre Wing Board Member, Sondra Gilman, and Texas Art Commissioner, Celso Gonzalez-Falla. The Musical Theatre Award is accompanied by a grant of $25,000. A number of smaller grants (between $1,000- $5,000) are also awarded at the ceremony. To qualify the "writers must have had at least one musical produced in either a commercial or a professional non-profit theatre in America."

== Previous Musical Theatre Award winners ==
Year	Winner(s)
1991	Craig Carnelia
1992	Louis Rosen
1993	Jeffrey Lunden and Arthur Perlman
1995	Jeanine Tesori and Brian Crawley
1996	Jason Robert Brown and Ray Leslee
1998	Robert Lindsay Nassif (author of Honky Tonk Highway & Ellior Ness in Cleveland).
1999	Doug Cohen and Polly Pen
2000	Kirsten Childs
2001	Andrew Lippa
2003	Matthew Sklar and Chad Beguelin

== Other Winners ==
- Michael John LaChiusa
- Robert Lindsay Nassif
- Andrew Lippa

== Grants ==
The Foundation also gives out commendations of $1000–$5000. Previous winners include:

- Kirsten Childs
- Martin Sylvestri
- Joel Higgins
- John Bucchino
- David Evans
- Bill Russell (lyricist)
- Lynn Ahrens
- Stephen Flaherty
- Jonathan Larson
