= Gillman (surname) =

Gillman is a surname. Notable people with the surname include:

- Benjamin H. Gillman (1870–1945), South Australian railways official
- Gustave Gillman (1856-1922), British ingenior and photographer who made a large contribution to railways in Southern Spain
- Henry Gillman (1833–1915), American ethnologist
- Herbert Webb Gillman (1832-1898), British/Ceylonese judge and historian
- Leonard Gillman (1917–2009), American mathematician
- Mariette Gillman, American slalom canoer
- Neil Gillman (1933–2017), American rabbi and philosopher
- Peter Gillman (born 1942), British writer and journalist
- Robert Gillman Allen Jackson (1911–1991), United Nations administrator
- Sid Gillman (1911–2003), American football coach
- Tricia Gillman (born 1951), British artist
- Webb Gillman (1870–1933), British Army General during World War I
