= Charles Gilman =

Charles Gilman may refer to:

- Charles J. Gilman (1824–1901), U.S. Representative from Maine
- Charles A. Gilman (1833–1924), Minnesota legislator
- Charles W. Gilman (1862–1938), Wisconsin legislator

== See also ==
- Charles Gilman Norris, U.S. novelist
