= Nicholas Benson =

American stone carver and typeface designer

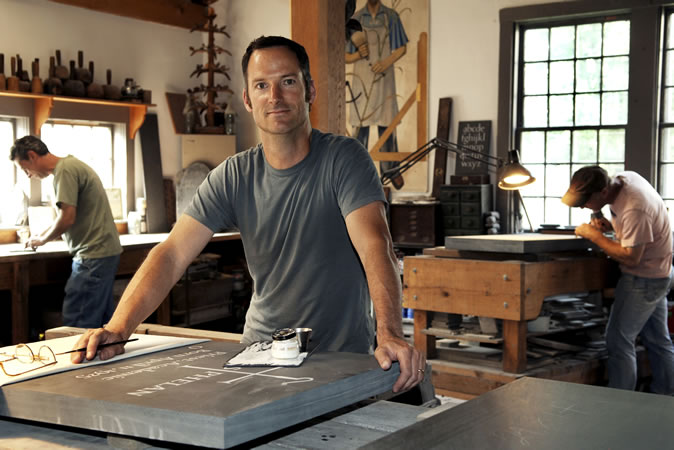
- Benson in 2007
- Born: August 19, 1964 (age 61)
- Education: State University of New York at Purchase, Schule für Gestaltung Basel
- Known for: Stone carving, Typography
- Awards: MacArthur Fellow; National Heritage Fellowship

Nicholas Waite "Nick" Benson (born August 19, 1964) is a third generation American stone carver, stone letterer and owner of The John Stevens Shop in Newport, Rhode Island. He was named a 2010 MacArthur Fellow.

== Early life ==
Nick Benson began working in his family business, The John Stevens Shop at age fifteen for his father, John Everett Benson. Nick is a third generation stone carver and letterer. He studied Drawing and Design at State University of New York at Purchase in 1986. Benson spent 1987 at the Schule für Gestaltung Basel in Basel, Switzerland where he studied calligraphy, type design, typography, and drawing under Andre Gurtler, Christian Mengelt and Armin Hofmann.

He returned to the U.S. in 1988 and continued to work under John Benson in The John Stevens Shop. His father passed on the business to him in 1993. Benson expands the traditional arts of hand lettering and stone carving through his designs. He is also committed to teaching young artisans, in the hopes that they will go on to create their own works and thereby ensure that the legacy of this centuries-old artistic practice endures. He has had several design students, especially from nearby Rhode Island School of Design, and apprentices work with him in the shop and on projects.

His uncle was the American photographer Richard Benson. Richard Benson was named a MacArthur Fellow in 1986, making the Bensons one of two families with multiple MacArthur fellows.

== Work ==
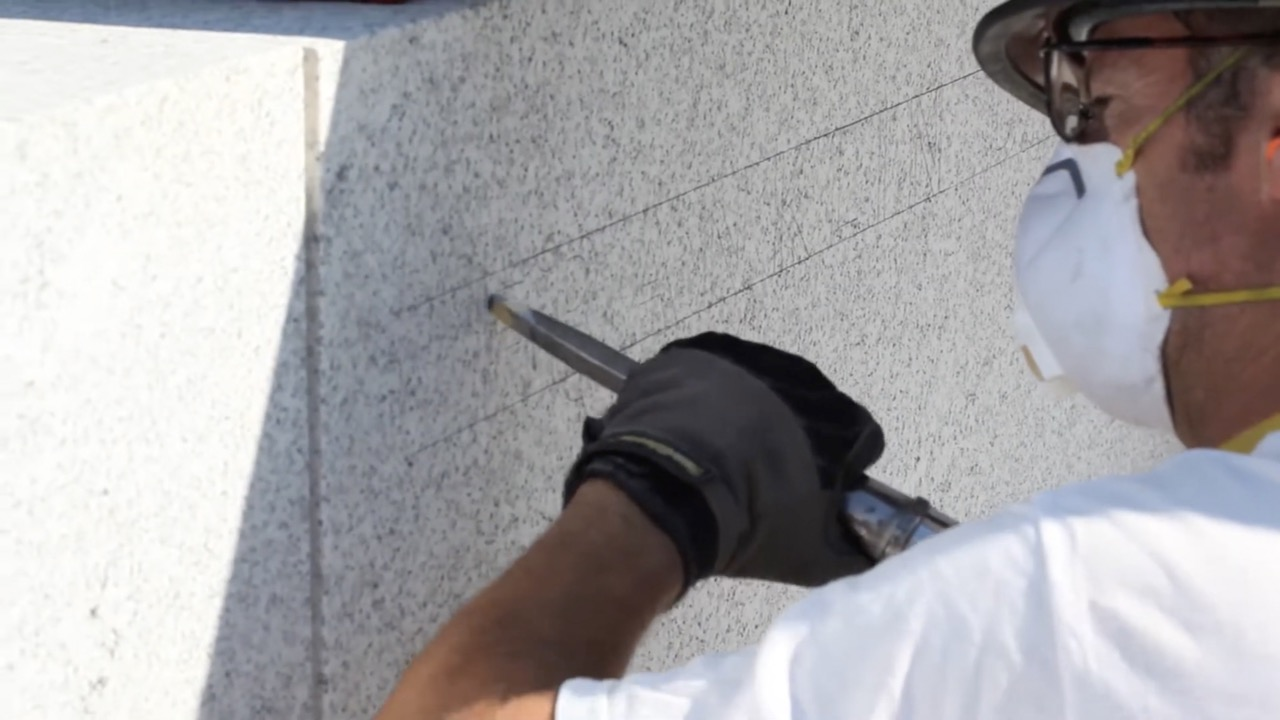
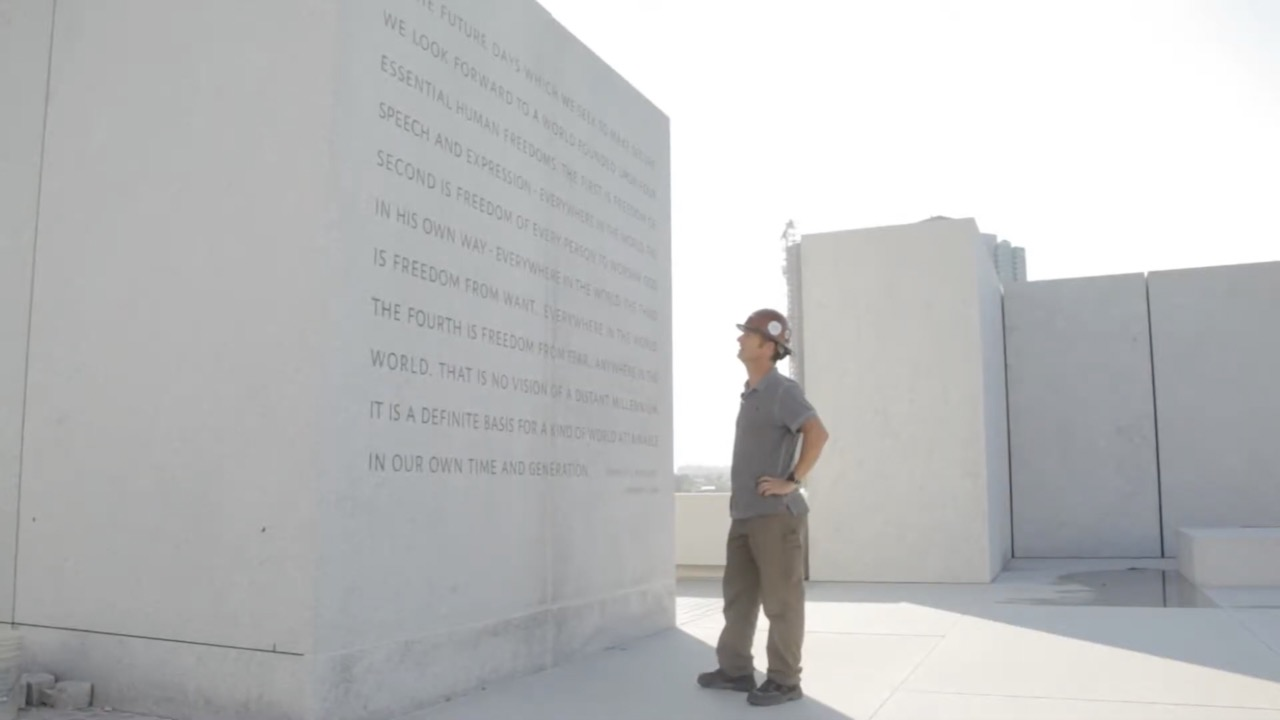
Benson working on lettering at Four Freedoms State Park, 2020

Benson has created a distinctive architectural lettering for these architectural and monumental commissions, with careful attention to the effects that large scale, shifting light, and long-term weathering have on the letters, as well as carefully crafting very small details of each letter. "The entire composition is key," he explained in an interview with the architectural historian Judith Dupré, "but the proportion of the letter, the design of the particular letter form itself, is extremely important too. Equally important is the cadence of the text, how counterspace is used, word spacing, line spacing—all of that is absolutely crucial to good inscriptional carving." He developed an original font that draws on both classical Greek letter forms and contemporary sans serif lettering for the Martin Luther King, Jr. Memorial, on the National Mall.

Benson's work at The John Stevens Shop has also included personal gravestones and tomb markers. Benson's father, grandfather and his predecessors at the Shop have created individual gravestones on materials including grey slate and Rhode Island granite.

His carvings can be found in the National Gallery of Art, the Yale University Art Gallery, at Brown University, and in Washington D.C., the National World War II Memorial and the Dwight D. Eisenhower Memorial.

He is a recipient of a 2007 National Heritage Fellowship awarded by the National Endowment for the Arts, which is the United States' highest honor in the folk and traditional arts.

== Family ==
Benson lives in Jamestown, Rhode Island, with his wife and two children.
