= Tricia Gillman =

British artist (born 1951)

- Born: 1951 (age 74–75); Johannesburg, South Africa
- Education: University of Leeds; University of Newcastle upon Tyne
- Known for: Painting
- Website: Tricia Gillman

Tricia Gillman (born 1951) is a British artist known for her brightly coloured abstract paintings.

Gillman was born in Johannesburg and studied at the University of Leeds from 1970 to 1974 and at the University of Newcastle upon Tyne between 1975 and 1977. She had her first solo exhibition in 1978 at the Parkinson Gallery in Leeds. Subsequent solo exhibitions took place at the Arnolfini in Bristol in 1985 and later at the Benjamin Rhodes Gallery in London and at the Laing Art Gallery in Newcastle. Gillman took part in a number of group shows in Liverpool starting in 1982, was represented in the Forces of Nature exhibition at Manchester City Art Gallery in 1990 and was part of a British Council exhibition that toured eastern Europe in 1990.

Gillman's work is included in the UK Government Art Collection, the New Hall Art Collection, the Herbert Art Gallery & Museum and the Victoria Gallery & Museum.

== Bibliography ==
- Tricia Gillman Paintings 1991-93 (1993), with essay by Keith Patrick
- Catalogue for Fictive Models (2012), with essay by Teresa Drace-Francis
