= Thomas Gilman =

Thomas Gilman may refer to:

- Thomas Gilman (miner) (1830–1911), American freedman, miner, farmer, and businessperson
- Thomas Gilman (wrestler) (born 1994), American freestyle wrestler

== See also ==
- List of contributors to Project 2025#Authors refers to Project 2025 contributor Thomas F. Gilman
