= Howard Gilman Foundation =

American nonprofit organization

- Formation: 1981
- Type: Charitable organization
- Headquarters: New York City, United States
- President: Mary C. Farrell
- Key people: Joseph M. Samulski
- Revenue: $4,820,120 (2015)
- Expenses: $14,438,036 (2015)
- Website: www.howardgilmanfoundation.org

The Howard Gilman Foundation is a charitable organization started by Howard Gilman.

- Howard Gilman Memorial Park
- Howard Gilman Opera House at the Brooklyn Academy of Music
- White Oak Plantation in Jacksonville, Florida
