= Anne Gilman =

Artist

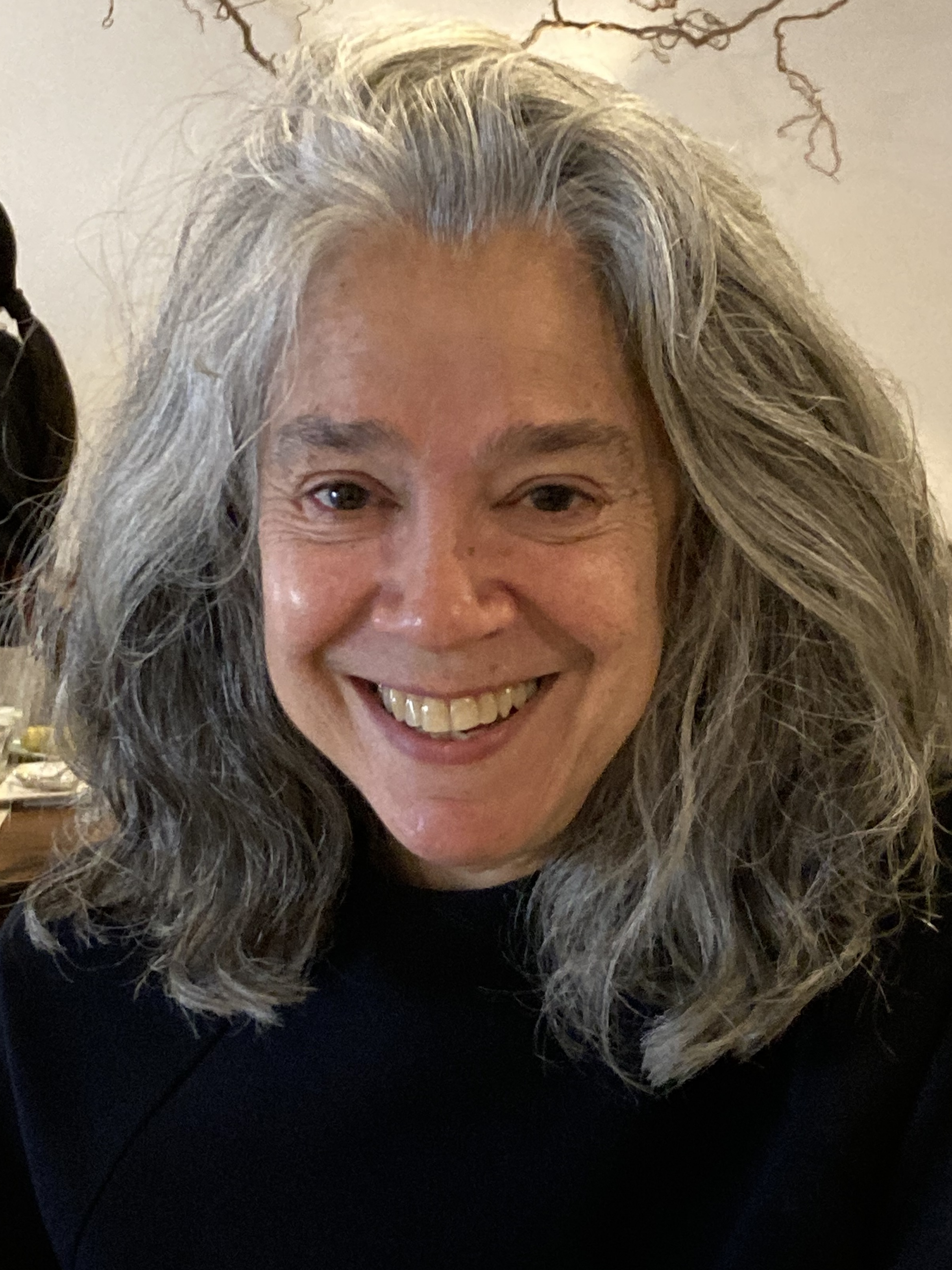
Anne Gilman in 2022

Anne Gilman (born 1953) is a Brooklyn-based artist known for making large-scale drawings with layers of pencil, ink, graphite, matte medium, BIC ballpoint pen, as well as tape and other media elements, evoking a sense of passage, navigation, documentation, and landscape.

== Early life and education ==
Gilman received a BFA from State University of New York at New Paltz and an MFA in Painting and Drawing from Brooklyn College where she studied with the artist Lee Bontecou.

== Career ==
Gilman's work has been featured in Bomb Magazine, Hyperallergic, Vasari21, Art Spiel, Guernica (magazine), Publishing Perspectives, and Red Fez. Her artist book, Bordes deshilachados/Frayed Edges, was published as a bilingual book by Ediciones Vigía, in Matanzas/Cuba, in January/2001.

She has been the recipient of many residencies and grants, including MacDowell (artists' residency and workshop) in 2012, The Edward F. Albee Foundation, in 2010, Cultural Space Subsidy Program, in Dumbo, Brooklyn, 2017–2020, The Ruth and Harold Chenven Foundation Award in 2015 and Faculty Development Grants, from Pratt Institute in 2022, 2014, 2011, 2007, 2004, and 2001.

She is a tenured adjunct professor, CCE, in the Fine Arts Program at Pratt Institute where she has taught for over 20 years and was the subject of an article on her non-traditional artist books in Prattfolio.
