= The John Stevens Shop =

Stone carving business in Rhode Island, US

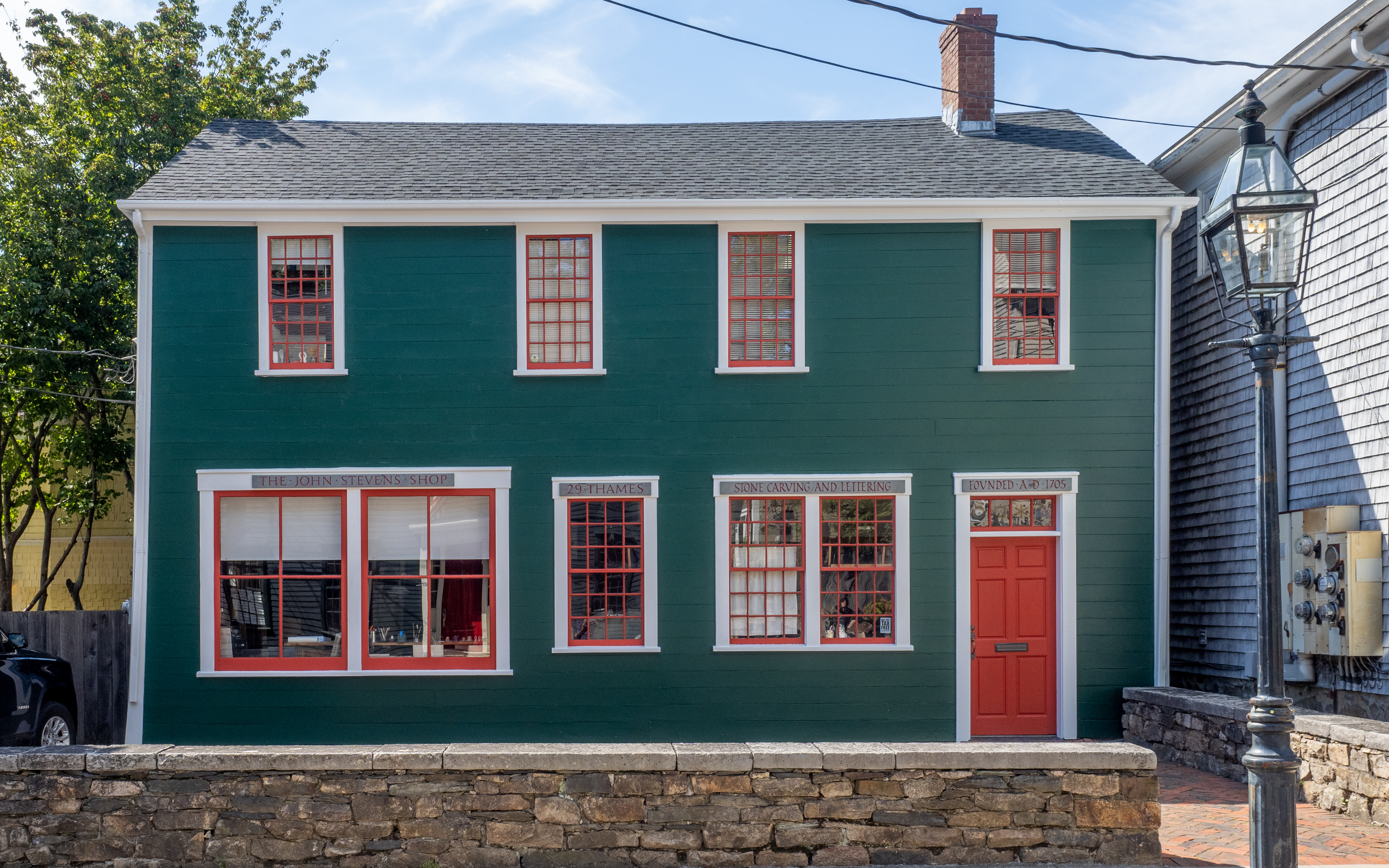

General information
- Architectural style: Colonial
- Location: Newport, Rhode Island, US
- Address: 29 Thames Street
- Coordinates: 41°29′33.88″N 71°18′56.09″W
- Owner: Nicholas Benson

The John Stevens Shop, founded in 1705, is a stone carving business on Thames Street in Newport, Rhode Island, that is one of the oldest continuously operating businesses in the United States.

== History ==
John Stevens was born in Oxfordshire, England. He immigrated to the American Colonies in 1698 and lived in Boston for several years before moving to Newport, where he set up shop at 30 Thames Street in 1705. The shop moved across the street to 29 Thames Street in the mid-eighteenth century. John Stevens, his sons John II and William, and his grandson John III produced arguably some of colonial America's most beautiful gravestones, many of which still sit in the nearby Common Burying Ground. The Stevens family ran the Shop for more than 220 years. In 1927, it was purchased by John Howard Benson.

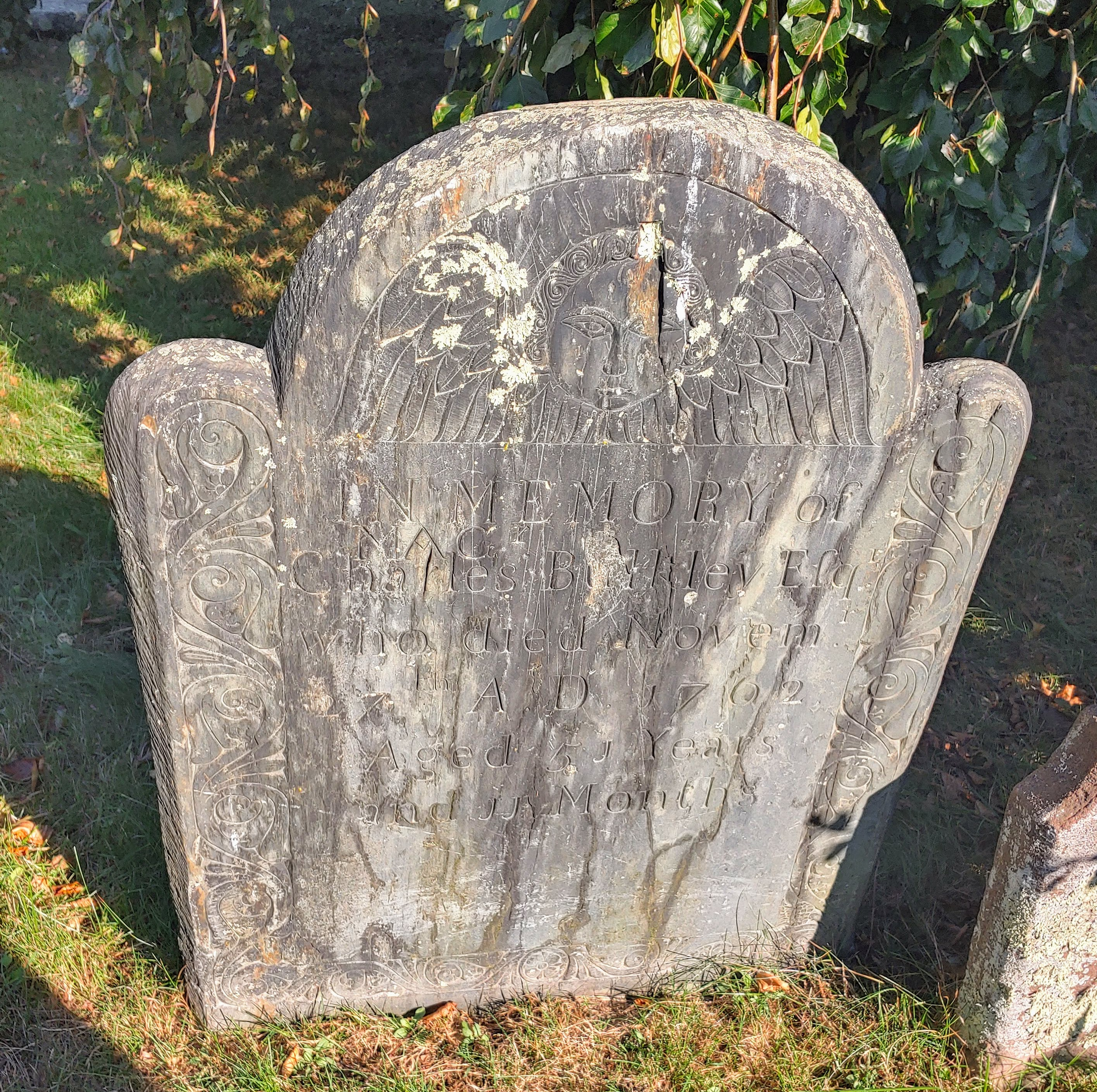
Grave marker carved by the John Stevens Shop in 1762. Stone located in Ye Antientist Burial Ground, New London

A Newport native, Benson studied at the Newport Art Association, the National Academy of Design, and the Art Students League of New York. He became an internationally renowned stone carver, designer, and calligrapher. He taught at the Rhode Island School of Design and, along with his business partner, Graham Carey, published the instructional book The Elements of Lettering in 1940. He designed and carved inscriptions for Yale University, Harvard University, and Brown University and designed the inscriptions on the Iwo Jima Memorial in Arlington National Cemetery. In 1955, he was awarded the Craftsmanship medal by the American Institute of Architects. He died in 1956, passing the business to his son John Everett Benson.

The younger Benson began working for his father at 15. He received a BFA in sculpture at the Rhode Island School of Design in 1961. In 1964, he was commissioned to design and carve the inscriptions for the John F. Kennedy Memorial in Arlington National Cemetery. He carved gravestones for Tennessee Williams, Lillian Hellman and George Balanchine; designed and carved inscriptions for the Prudential Center in Boston, the Boston Public Library, the National Gallery of Art, the Dallas Museum of Art, the Chicago Mercantile Exchange Center and the Armand Hammer Museum of Art in Los Angeles; and carved the date stones of the Vietnam Memorial in Washington, D.C. He designed site-specific fonts and incised inscriptions on the Civil Rights Memorial in Montgomery, Alabama; the Franklin Delano Roosevelt Memorial in Washington, D.C.; and the Federal Courthouse in Boston. During his 40 years at the John Stevens Shop, Benson was awarded the Craftsmanship medal by the American Institute of Architects, the National Pell Award for Distinguished Achievement in the Arts. In 1985 he was awarded an honorary doctoral degree by the Rhode Island School of Design. In 2000, he received the Presidential Design Award for Excellence in the Arts for his work on the FDR Memorial. In 1993, he turned over the business to his son Nicholas Benson, who continues to produce hand-carved inscriptions in stone.

In 2007, Nicholas Benson was awarded the National Endowment for the Arts National Heritage Fellowship and in 2010 he was awarded a MacArthur Fellowship from the John D. and Catherine T. MacArthur Foundation.

== Notable Inscriptions ==
- World War II Memorial
- Martin Luther King Jr. Memorial
