= Howard Gilman =

American businessman (1924–1998)

- Born: 15 February 1924; Manhattan
- Died: 3 January 1998 (aged 73); Florida
- Occupation: Industrialist
- Parent: Sylvia Gilman

Howard Gilman (February 15, 1924 – January 3, 1998) was an American business magnate and philanthropist. He was a descendant of Isaac Gilman, who had founded the Gilman Paper Company in 1884.

== Biography ==
Gilman was born and raised on Manhattan's Upper East Side. He attended Horace Mann School in the Bronx, New York, and received his bachelor's degree in 1944 from Dartmouth College, where he was elected to Phi Beta Kappa. He served in the Navy during World War II.

His father Charles Gilman, was the president of the Gilman Paper Company. After his death in 1967, Gilman's brother Charles "Chris" Gilman Jr. became president and Gilman, who was the older brother, became a senior officer. His relationship with his brother deteriorated due to envy and resentment about the company's control. When their mother Sylvia Gilman sided with his brother in 1979, Gilman was disinherited and his brother took over the company. Through a deal wherein the two brothers received 50% of Gilman for free from the trust that managed their father's estate, Gilman's attorney was able to regain his share of the paper company. After his brother died from a heart attack in 1982, his widow Sondra Gilman sold him her share of the company.

Gilman invested $300 million on his charities and other projects between 1988 and 1997. The largest project was spending $154 million transforming the White Oak Plantation in Yulee, Florida—which was acquired by the Gilman family in 1938—into a conservation preserve and conference center.

Gilman died in 1998 of a heart attack at age 73, at his White Oak estate near Jacksonville, Florida. He had $1.1 billion in assets, and $550 million of debt. As he was childless, he donated his assets to the Howard Gilman Foundation. The Brooklyn Academy of Music has the Howard Gilman Opera House. The Howard Gilman Gallery houses his extensive collection at the Metropolitan Museum of Art and the Howard Gilman Theater is located at Lincoln Center. The position of director of the arts center at Dartmouth was endowed by the Howard Gilman Foundation and is entitled the Howard L. Gilman '44 Executive Director.
