= Gilman Paper Company =

American paper company

The Gilman Paper Company was an American paper producer founded by Isaac Gilman in the 1880s in the village of Fitzdale, Vermont, which would later be renamed Gilman, Vermont.

== History ==
Gilman Paper Company's founder, Isaac Gilman, emigrated from Ukraine and began working in the paper manufacturing business in 1881. In 1921, Gilman Paper Company purchased the Fitzdale Paper Company. From 1921 to 1924, a period of major renovations and construction occurred. The steam plant, built in 1901, was demolished and replaced with four Stirling boilers and a 225-foot-high chimney. Two buildings were erected to house the paper machines and the grocery bag department. During this period, most of the employee residences in the nearby village were built and provided with fire, sewer, and water systems. Over the next decade, Gilman Paper Company expanded manufacturing in the paper converting field, opening a Kraft bag department, a gummed tape department, and a department that produced twisted yarn made from paper.

In the 1940s, Isaac Gilman's son Charles Gilman built an additional mill in St. Mary's, Georgia. The company was capable of producing 2.6 million pounds of paper per day, employed 1,100 workers and 1,500 independent contractors, with headquarters at 111 West 50th Street, New York. Gilman Paper Company grew to become the largest privately held paper company in the United States. In addition to the pulp mill in St. Marys, Georgia, Gilman Paper Company acquired extensive timberland in Florida and Georgia, including 7,400 acres in Nassau County, Florida that would become White Oak Conservation. A short-line railroad was built to haul trees, pulp, and paper. In 1969, Gilman Paper Company's Vermont mill was sold to Georgia-Pacific Corporation.

At the death of Charles Gilman in 1967, the company was run by his two sons, Charles (Chris) Gilman, Jr. and Howard Gilman. The article, The Fall of The House of Gilman, published in Forbes Magazine in 2003, described Gilman Paper Company's management under Charles and Howard Gilman:

Their relationship became strained, riven by jealousy and bitterness over control of the company, according to friends and family. In 1979, their mother, Sylvia, sided with Chris, disinheriting Howard and leaving Chris with control of the business.

With the assistance of attorney Bernard D. Bergreen, Howard Gilman was able to reinstate his stake in Gilman Paper Company. At the death of Charles Gilman, Jr., in January 1982, Howard Gilman bought the balance of the company from Charles's estate. Howard Gilman later died of a heart attack at his White Oak Conservation in Yulee, Florida, in 1998. At the time of his death, the Gilman family fortune was estimated to be $1.1 billion in assets, with $550 million in debts.

The paper mill was subsequently sold to Durango Products of Mexico. In 2002, Durango entered into bankruptcy, and the paper mill was shut down in September 2002.

== Environmental and legal record ==
=== St. Marys, Georgia ===
Gilman Paper Company began operation of a mill in St. Marys, Georgia, in 1941. By the 1970s, the location produced 900 tons of paper a day. Of the 4,000 residents of St. Marys, Gilman Paper Company employed between 1,500 and 2,000 individuals. At its peak, the mill's manager, George W. Brumley, reported:

Gilman Paper Company is the only major Georgia industry south of Brunswick and east of Waycross. It can safely be stated that not less than 75 percent of the economy of Camden County is directly dependent on Gilman Paper Company.

Of those employed by Gilman Paper Company was Georgia State Representative Robert W. Harrison, who served as the attorney for the St. Marys mill; the attorney for the surrounding cities of St. Marys, Kingsland, and Folkston; the attorney for the local school board and the hospital authority; and the attorney for Camden and Charlton Counties. Disputes that arose over Gilman Paper Company's obligation to pay city and county taxes were resolved by Robert Harrison, who spoke on behalf of Gilman Paper Company, the city, and the county.

Gilman Paper Company's 1958 tax arrangement with the city of St. Marys guaranteed that the valuation placed on its assets for property tax purposes remained frozen at its 1958 level. The agreement also exempted Gilman Paper Company from paying city tax on any new land purchases. The mill's value was listed on the St. Marys 1970 tax digest as $3 million, in contrast to the Camden County digest, which required approval by the state of Georgia, and placed the value at $15.4 million.

==== Statewide and national publicity ====
In 1970, members of Ralph Nader's “Nader’s Raiders” were located in nearby Savannah, Georgia, conducting the study, The Water Lords, regarding the influence of large companies on the pollution, tax evasion, and economy of surrounding areas. Gilman Paper Company's labor union president, Wyman Westberry, contacted the project's members to bring attention to the 18 million gallons of wastewater the mill generated daily and was discharging into the St. Marys River without treatment.

In May 1972, Ralph Nader associates, Harrison Wellford and Peter Schuck, published an article in Harper's Magazine about Gilman Paper Company's St. Marys location, titled Democracy and the Good Life in a Company Town. Later that spring, Mike Wallace and the film crew of CBS Evening News 60 Minutes visited St. Marys to interview the mill's manager, George W. Brumley, and report on Gilman Paper Company's tax arrangements and involvement in local politics. Newsweek also featured a column detailing Gilman Paper Company's presence in St. Marys, Georgia.

During the September 1970 primary election for the office of the Georgia state representative from the 66th District, local physician and Camden County resident, Carl Drury, successfully campaigned against Gilman Paper Company's attorney and incumbent state legislator, Robert W. Harrison. However, in October 1970, ten days before the general election, Carl Drury was approached by a Gilman Paper Company employee with an accusation of medical misconduct. Carl Drury was informed that the accusation would be withdrawn if he would agree to end his campaign. Carl Drury refused to end his campaign, his medical license was suspended, and a grand jury was convened to investigate the charges. Nonetheless, Carl Drury won the general election and took office as state legislator in February 1971. The grand jury issued a report clearing Carl Drury of the charges, after investigation revealed that the eyewitness affidavit had been signed in the office of opponent Robert W. Harrison by an individual who claimed never to have read it.

After winning the election, state representative Carl Drury requested investigation of Gilman Paper Company's affairs, ranging from taxes to pollution control. The director of the Georgia Watershed Protection Branch ordered Gilman Paper Company to increase its anti-pollution efforts. The Georgia attorney general ruled that the tax arrangement between Gilman Paper Company and St. Marys was unconstitutional. The legislature passed a law requiring cities to use the county tax valuations, which are approved by the state, in determining city taxes. Gilman Paper Company's annual taxes in St. Marys rose from $45,000 to $227,000. A federal grand jury was convened to investigate irregularities in the county's politics.

Following the increased environment regulation, tax assessments, and negative publicity in 1972, a Gilman Paper Company supervisor, William (Tommy) Thomas, offered fellow mill employee, Lawrence Brown, $50,000 to kill the labor union president, Wyman Westberry. According to his later testimony, Lawrence Brown never intended to follow-through with the contract, but instead warned Wyman Westberry of the solicitation. Westberry and Brown drove across the state line to Florida, where they contacted the FBI. The FBI and the Georgia Bureau of Investigation provided Lawrence Brown with covert listening devices to record his conversations. Lawrence Brown proceeded to meet with George W. Brumley, Vice President and resident manager of the Gilman Paper Company; Robert W. Harrison, longtime attorney, former legislator, and local counsel for Gilman Paper Company; and William (Tommy) Thomas, an employee of Gilman. On the evidence gathered, a federal grand jury convened to take testimony about the murder plot in May 1972.

During Lawrence Brown's testimony, he repudiated his story and stated that the account of solicitation had been a mistake. After release, Brown continued to express that he was forced to renounce his story from fear of the Gilman Paper Company executives. By summer 1972, Lawrence Brown was reported missing. The Atlanta Journal-Constitution ran the front-page story for September 19, 1972, Offered $1,500 to Kill – Now He’s Missing.

October 15, 1975, the United States grand jury, sitting at Savannah, indicted George W. Brumley, Vice President and resident manager of the Gilman Paper Company at St. Marys, Georgia; Robert W. Harrison, longtime attorney, former legislator, and local counsel for Gilman Paper Company; and William (Tommy) Thomas, an employee of Gilman. A nine-day jury trial resulted in the conviction of all three defendants on all pending counts, including conspiracy to commit murder.

Gilman Paper Company's mill in St. Marys, Georgia, was the subject of the CBS Evening News 60 Minutes documentary Company Town, released in 1972. The film alleges that improper waste disposal, political corruption, and tax arrangements by the Gilman Paper Company resulted in the civil right infringement of the residents of St. Marys, Georgia, and employees of the mill.

== Gallery ==
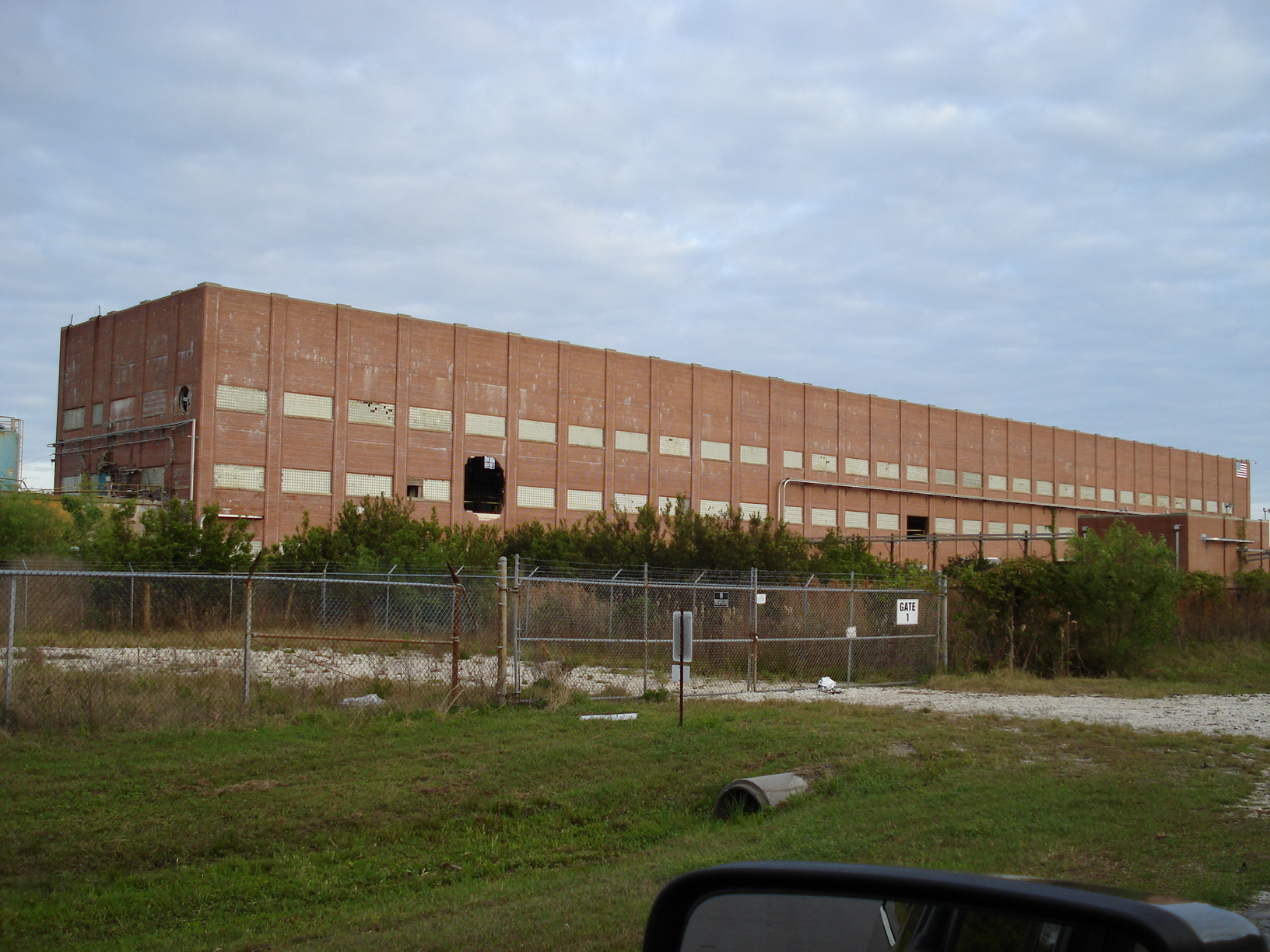
Gilman Paper Company

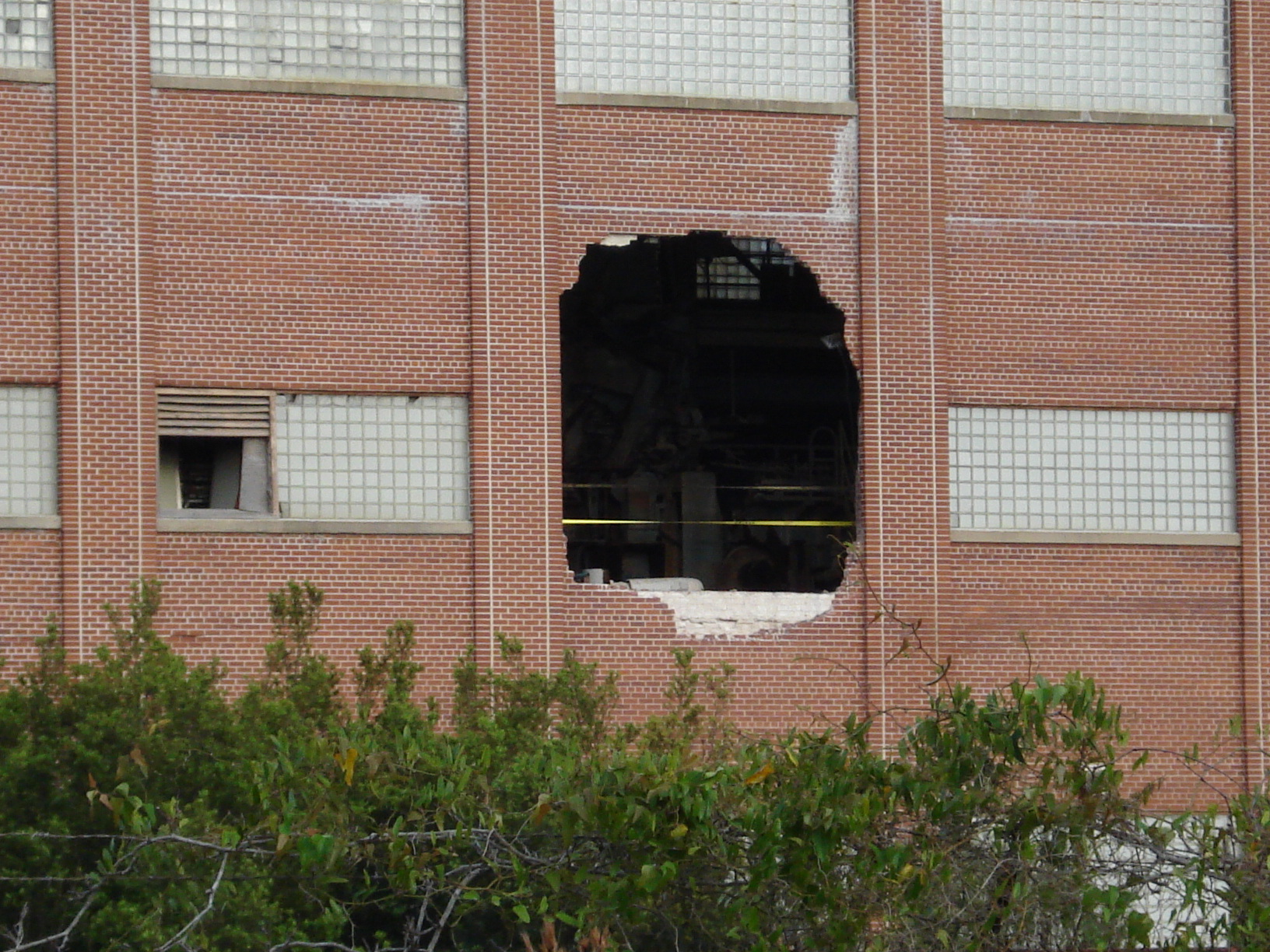
Gilman Paper Company
