= Joy Davidson =

American opera singer (1937–2023)

Joy Davidson (born Joyce Elaine Ferguson, August 18, 1937 – February 5, 2023) was an American mezzo-soprano, actress, and pedagogue. She had an international opera career from 1965 to 1995. Afterwards she performed periodically as a stage actress into the 2010s. She was the founder of the opera program of the New World School of the Arts in Miami, Florida where she taught from 1989 until her retirement in 2002.

== Early life and education ==
The daughter of Clarence W. Ferguson and his wife Jessie E Ferguson, Joyce Elaine Ferguson was born in Fort Collins, Colorado on August 18, 1937. She was a graduate of Fort Collins High School. She earned a Bachelor of Arts degree from Occidental College in 1959. While a student there she trained as a contralto under voice teacher Howard Swan. In August 1959 she married Robert Scott Davidson.

She worked briefly as an elementary school music teacher before pursuing graduate studies in opera at Florida State University with Elena Nikolaidi. She attended the UCLA Summer Opera Program where she was a student of Jan Popper. She later studied with Irma McDaniels and Daniel Harris in Miami.

== Singing career ==
Davidson made her professional opera debut in 1965 in the title role of Rossini's La Cenerentola with the Miami Opera. That same year she was engaged by the Metropolitan Opera National Company with whom she toured the United States in performances for the next two years. Among the roles she portrayed with the company was the title role in Benjamin Britten's The Rape of Lucretia.

In 1967 Davidson won first prize in the Sofia International Opera Singers Competition. In 1969 she made her debut at the New York City Opera (NYCO) as Kontschakowna in Borodin's Prince Igor and made her first appearance at the San Francisco Opera as The Secretary in Menotti's The Consul. That same year she portrayed Sister Jeanne in the United States premiere of The Devils of Loudun at the Santa Fe Opera. In 1970 she returned to San Francisco to portray the title heroine in Bizet's Carmen (with Plácido Domingo), and appeared at Philharmonic Hall as the First Angel in Mendelssohn's Elijah with the New York Philharmonic under conductor Lukas Foss.

In 1971 Davidson made her debut at La Scala as Delilah to Pier Miranda Ferraro's Samson in Samson and Delilah. That same year she returned to the NYCO to portray Carmen to Michele Molese's Don José under Julius Rudel in Tito Capobianco's production.

She portrayed The Secretary again for her debuts at the Festival dei Due Mondi and the Spoleto Festival USA in 1972. In 1974 she made her debut at the Vienna State Opera as Carmen and was also seen at that house as Preziosilla in La forza del destino.

In 1976 Davidson created the role of Hannah Bilby in the world premiere of Carlisle Floyd's Bilby's Doll at the Houston Grand Opera. That same year she made her debut at the Lyric Opera of Chicago as Clarice in The Love for Three Oranges and her debut with the Metropolitan Opera as Adalgisa in Norma (opposite Shirley Verrett). She returned to Chicago in 1978 to create the role of Sin in the world premiere of Penderecki's Paradise Lost, which was subsequently seen at La Scala. In 1979 she created the title role in Garland Anderson's Soyazhe at the Central City Opera.

Engagements in leading roles with opera houses internationally followed, including the Baltimore Opera, the Bavarian State Opera, Dallas Opera, the Dutch National Opera, the Edmonton Opera, the Fort Worth Opera, Opera Guild of Greater Miami (Carmen, opposite Franco Corelli and Norman Treigle in his last Escamillo, 1973), the Liceu, the Maggio Musicale Fiorentino (Agnese di Hohenstaufen, with Leyla Gencer, conducted by Riccardo Muti, 1974), the New Orleans Opera (Carmen), the Sofia National Opera, the Opéra National de Lyon, the Seattle Opera, the Teatro di San Carlo, the Teatro Regio Turino, the Teatro Nacional de São Carlos, Tulsa Opera, and the Welsh National Opera among others.

Davidson's operatic farewell occurred in 1995, at the Florida Grand Opera, as Gertrude in Roméo et Juliette.

== Later life and death ==
Davidson founded the opera program at the New World School of the Arts in 1989. She taught there until her retirement in 2002. In 2008 she taught a masterclass at William Paterson University.

In her later life she worked periodically as a dramatic actress. She portrayed Maria Callas in multiple plays at multiple locations; appearing as Callas in Terrence McNally's Master Class and Alma H. Bond's Maria: The Life and Loves of Maria Callas. In 2011 she portrayed the Nurse in the Florida Repertory Theatre's production of Euripides's Medea (Jeffers version).

She died in Florida in February 2023.
