= Thomas Paul (bass) =

American bass and voice teacher (born 1934)

Thomas Warburton Paul (born February 22, 1934) is an American bass and voice teacher who had an active performance career during the second half of the 20th century. While more frequently heard in oratorios and other concert literature, Paul also appeared in operas during his career with companies like the New York City Opera, the San Francisco Opera, and Washington National Opera. In 1964 he created the role of Jack Spaniard in the world premiere of Robert Ward's The Lady From Colorado at the Central City Opera. In 1976 he portrayed Jared Bilby in the world premiere of Carlisle Floyd's Bilby's Doll at the Houston Grand Opera. He was a full time professor of voice at the Eastman School of Music at the University of Rochester from 1973 through 1998, and also taught at the Aspen Music Festival and School.

Paul has made recordings with The Cleveland Orchestra, the Philadelphia Orchestra, the Robert Shaw Chorale, and the Speculum Musicae chamber ensemble among other music groups. Along with mezzo-soprano Jan DeGaetani, he was nominated for the Grammy Award for Best Chamber Music Performance at the 33rd Annual Grammy Awards (1991) for his performance on the Juilliard String Quartet's 1990 recording of Joseph Haydn's The Seven Last Words of Christ. Paul collaborated with DeGaetani numerous times during his career and several composers created new music for the duo; including composers Elliott Carter, Bernard Rands, and Edgard Varèse. In 1991 he was named Mu Phi Epsilon's Musician of the Year.

== Early life and education ==
Born Thomas Warburton Paul in Chicago on February 22, 1934, Paul began his musical training as a child as a violinist and violist. He studied violin, viola, and conducting in both his undergraduate and graduate studies; earning a Bachelor of Arts from Occidental College in Los Angeles in 1956 before pursuing graduate work at the Juilliard School in 1956–57. At Occidental College his teachers included Robert Arthur Gross (viola) and Howard Swan (voice), and at Juilliard he studied conducting with Jean Morel and Frederic Waldman.

Paul's path reoriented towards singing when he became a member of the U.S. Army Chorus in 1957; singing with the group for two years. During these two years in Washington D.C. he studied voice with Themy Georgi. After leaving the U.S. Army Chorus in 1959 to pursue a solo career, he began performing under the name Thomas Paul in 1961 when he relocated back to New York City. In New York he continued to pursue vocal studies, first with Austrian tenor and Juilliard School voice teacher Hans Joachim Heinz (1961–1964), and then Beverley Peck Johnson (1964–69). He continued to periodically study singing throughout his career with teachers like Gibner Kind, Cornelius L. Reid, and Ted Puffer; the latter of whom he began studies with in 1999.

== Singing career ==
In 1961 Paul made his debut at Carnegie Hall performing with the Cantata Singers and conductor Thomas Dunn as Gobryas in George Frideric Handel's Belshazzar with soprano Saramae Endich as Nitocris of Babylon, Florence Kopleff as the prophet Daniel, Betty Allen as Cyrus the Great, and tenor Charles Bressler in the tile role. He performed with Dunn again at Carnegie Hall later that year as the bass soloist in Johann Sebastian Bach's Mass in B minor. That same year he was a soloist in Beethoven's Symphony No. 9 with the Long Beach Symphony Orchestra and Marilyn Horne as a fellow vocalist.

In 1962 Paul made his debut at the New York City Opera (NYCO) as Sparafucile in Giuseppe Verdi's Rigoletto. He returned to the NYCO numerous times over the next ten years where his roles included The Commendatore in Mozart's Don Giovanni (1962), Don Marco in Gian Carlo Menotti’s The Saint of Bleeker Street (1963), Pimen in Boris Godunov (1964), Zuniga in Carmen (1964), Colline in Giacomo Puccini's La bohème (1964), and Tiresias in Igor Stravinsky's Oedipus rex (1964). He also sang the latter role with the New York Philharmonic in 1966 with Shirley Verrett as Jocasta. Paul notably portrayed Tolomeo in the NYCO's lauded 1971 production of Handel's Giulio Cesare; a production which turned Beverly Sills into an international superstar.

Paul performed in several productions with the San Francisco Opera in the 1960s, including the roles of the Speaker in Mozart's The Magic Flute (1963), Sparafucile in Giuseppe Verdi's Rigoletto (1963), Colline in Giacomo Puccini's La bohème (1964), and Nourabad in Georges Bizet's Les pêcheurs de perles (1964). In 1964 he created the role of Jack Spaniard in the world premiere of Robert Ward's The Lady From Colorado at the Central City Opera. That same year he returned to Carnegie Hall to portray Daniel Webster in Virgil Thomson's The Mother of Us All with the American Opera Society, was the bass soloist in both Bach's Gott fähret auf mit Jauchzen, BWV 43 and Schubert's Mass No. 6 in E flat with the Musica Aeterna Orchestra and conductor Frederic Waldman at the Metropolitan Museum of Art, and was heard again in the Mass in B minor, this time with the Masterwork Chorus and conductor David Randolph at Lincoln Center's Philharmonic Hall.

Paul is the bass soloist in The Cleveland Orchestra's 1961 recording of Beethoven's Missa solemnis, and in the Robert Shaw Chorale's 1966 recording of Handel's Messiah; both made for RCA Victor with conductor Robert Shaw. He was also the bass soloist in the Philadelphia Orchestra's 1970 recording of Bach's St John Passion with Eugene Ormandy conducting. On July 19, 1968 he was a soloist in Beethoven’s Ninth Symphony for the grand opening of the Blossom Music Center with soprano Phyllis Curtin, mezzo Jane Hobson, tenor Ernst Haefliger, conductor George Szell and The Cleveland Orchestra. He performed with that orchestra again in 1970 as Friar Lawrence in Hector Berlioz's Roméo et Juliette with tenor George Shirley, mezzo Anna Reynolds, and conductor Pierre Boulez. In 1973 he portrayed Polyphemus in Handel's Acis and Galatea at Lincoln Center's Mostly Mozart Festival.

In 1976 Paul portrayed Jared Bilby in the world premiere of Carlisle Floyd's Bilby's Doll at the Houston Grand Opera. In 1978 he performed in the world premiere of Elliott Carter's Syringa, a work dedicated to British music critic William Glock and using English words by the American poet John Ashbery in addition to text by Ancient Greek writers like Homer and Plato. The concert and composition was funded by the National Endowment for the Arts. Conductor Harvey Sollberger led the premiere's musical's forces which in addition to Paul included mezzo-soprano Jan DeGaetani and the Speculum Musicae chamber ensemble. Carter had specifically composed the work for Paul and DeGaetaini, who in addition to being fellow voice teachers at the Eastman School of Music, were frequent collaborators as performing artists. In 1982 the duo recorded Carter's Syringa; once again with Sollberger and the Speculum Musicae. They were both nominated for the Grammy Award for Best Chamber Music Performance at the 33rd Annual Grammy Awards (1991) for their performance on the Juilliard String Quartet's 1990 recording of Joseph Haydn's The Seven Last Words of Christ.

In 1980 Paul gave a recital at Alice Tully Hall; his first in New York City. In 1981 he starred in Rossini's Mosè in Egitto with the Opera Company of Philadelphia. From 1981-1986 he performed regularly with the Bach Aria Group. In 1983 he performed the role of the King of Egypt in Verdi's Aida at the San Diego Opera with Gilda Cruz-Romo in the title role. In 1986 he returned to the San Francisco Opera as Le Comte des Grieux in Jules Massenet's Manon with Sheri Greenawald in the title role. That same year he performed the role of Arkel in Claude Debussy's Pelléas et Mélisande in a concert version of the opera with the Philadelphia Orchestra and conductor Dennis Russell Davies.

In 1993 Paul was the bass soloist in the world premiere of Bernard Rands's Canti dell'Eclisse which he performed and recorded with the Philadelphia Orchestra under conductor Gerard Schwarz. In 1995 he was a featured performer in a concert of the works of composer Amy Beach at Alice Tully Hall. In 1994 he was a featured soloist at the Shenyang International Music Festival in China. In 1995 he was the bass soloist in Handel's Messiah with the National Symphony Orchestra at the Kennedy Center. In 1996 he performed the role of Le Bailli in the Washington National Opera's production of Jules Massenet's Werther. In 1997 he performed the role of Rocco in a concert version of Beethoven's Fidelio with The New Haven Symphony and Chorale at Yale University.

== Teaching career ==
In 1970 Paul joined the voice faculty at the Aspen Music Festival and School; a position he maintained for more than a decade. His work at Aspen included both teaching as well as performing, and he enjoyed his experience doing both so much that he decided to pursue a career as a music educator while maintaining his performance career. He joined the voice faculty at the Eastman School of Music at the University of Rochester in 1973. He was a full time professor at Eastman until his retirement in 1998.
