= Blossom Music Center =

Outdoor amphitheatre in Cuyahoga Falls, Ohio

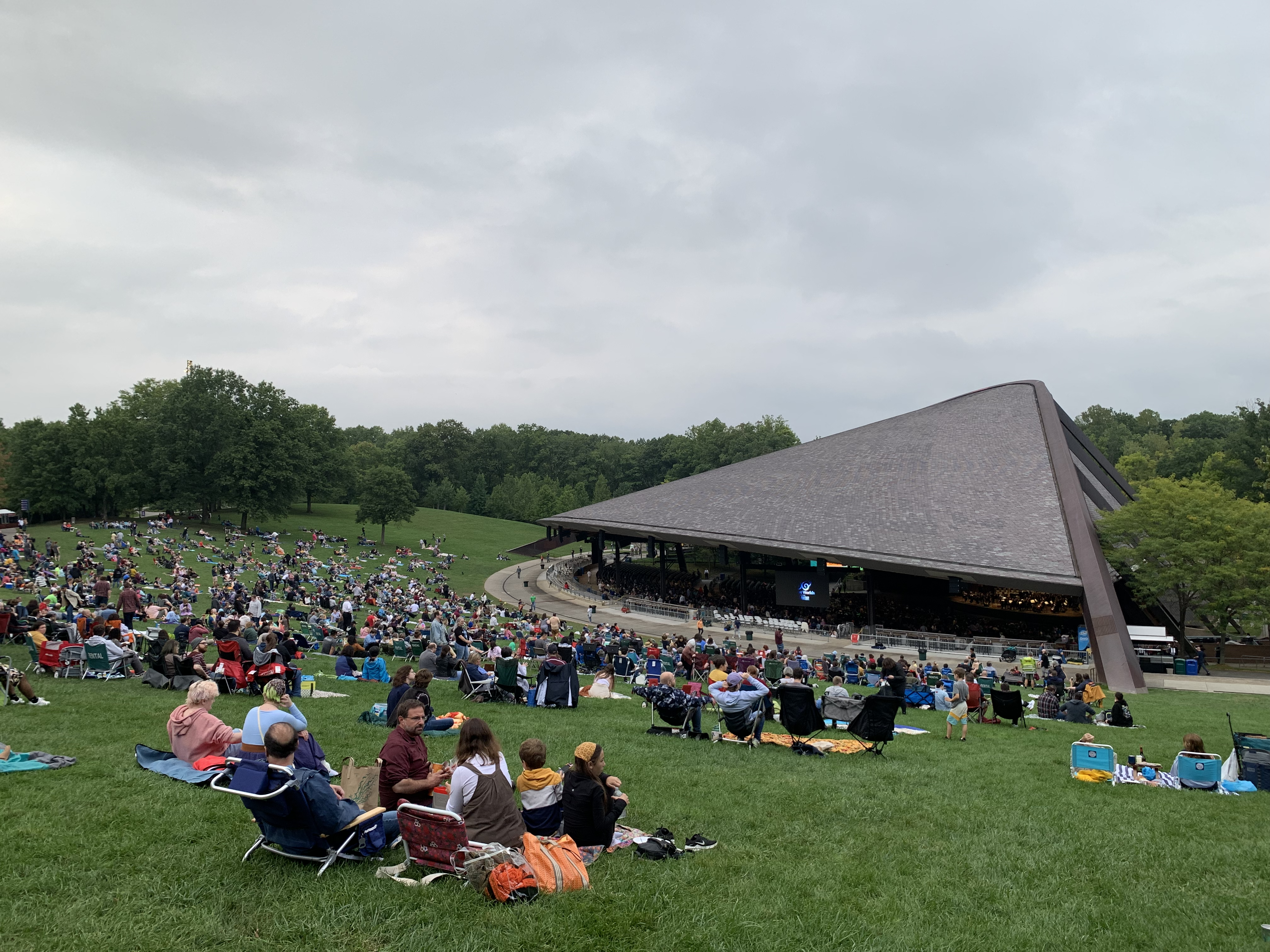
- Interactive map of Blossom Music Center
- Address: 1145 W Steels Corners Rd.
- Location: Cuyahoga Falls, Ohio
- Coordinates: 41°11′29″N 81°33′38″W
- Owner: Musical Arts Association
- Operator: Musical Arts Association; Live Nation Entertainment
- Capacity: 23,000
- Type: amphitheater

Construction
- Opened: 1968

Website
- clevelandorchestra.com/discover/blossom-music-center/

Blossom Music Center, locally referred to simply as Blossom, is an outdoor amphitheatre in Cuyahoga Falls, Ohio, United States. The venue is the summer home of The Cleveland Orchestra and the site of the ensemble’s annual Blossom Festival. Blossom Music Center is owned by the Musical Arts Association, the Orchestra’s parent organization.

== History ==
The Blossom Music Center is named after the families of Dudley S. Blossom Sr., and Dudley S. Blossom Jr. The former had served as the president of the Musical Arts Association from 1936 to 1938, and his widow Elizabeth and daughter-in-law Emily continued to support the Musical Arts Association after Dudley Jr.’s death in 1961. The Board’s president, Frank E. Joseph, felt that the Blossom family was “more deserving of the honor than any other Cleveland family.” The pavilion is constructed of slate and tubular steel, and seats 6,051 people. Behind the pavilion is a general-admission lawn section, which can seat an additional 15,000 audience members. The venue is also host to a full summer schedule of popular music acts and symphonic performances. Blossom’s natural parabolic setting, the pavilion’s sloping slate roof, and the countryside’s wooded surroundings distinguish it from other contemporary amphitheaters.

For many years, members of The Cleveland Orchestra had struggled to gain year-round employment playing music. During the early 1950s, summer performances were held at Public Hall in downtown Cleveland and, on occasion, in the outfield of Cleveland Stadium before Indians’ games. In the mid-1960s, music director George Szell was driven to find employment for his musicians throughout the summer months. Beginning in 1965, the Musical Arts Association began to investigate possible sites on which to build the Orchestra’s new summer home. Szell had a clear vision in mind: “It is of course IMPERATIVE to have such an installation for the summer, it seems to me even more important to have it turn out to be exceptional, absolutely first rate, terribly attractive...”

In July 1966, the Musical Arts Association decided to purchase 571 acres (231 ha) of land near in what was then Northampton Township, approximately 10 miles (16 km) north of Akron and about 30 miles (48 km) south of Cleveland. Eventually, more land was acquired to bring the total amount owned by the Musical Arts Association to 800 acres (320 ha). By 1967, the Musical Arts Association would launch its “Half Century Campaign” to raise money for the construction of Blossom’s pavilion. The initial collaboration included Connecticut-based acoustician Christopher Jaffe and Cleveland architectural firm Shafer, Flynn and Van Dijk, which oversaw the modeling and building of the amphitheater. As construction proceeded, Jaffe was replaced by German recording engineer Heinrich Heilholz, whom Szell preferred. The fundraising campaign reached its goal of $6.6 million, and ground was broken on July 2, 1967.

The Blossom Festival’s inaugural concert, featuring Beethoven’s Ninth Symphony conducted by Szell, took place on July 19, 1968, with a live television broadcast on WKYC-TV3. Soloists in the 9th included soprano Phyllis Curtin, mezzo Jane Hobson, tenor Ernst Haefliger, and bass Thomas Paul. The following year the Orchestra hosted its first Fourth of July concert at Blossom — led by Meredith Willson, who composed The Music Man.

In 2003, Blossom underwent a $17 million renovation intended to enhance a number of areas across the venue, including the sound system, stage, guest services, parking lots, and landscaping. In a transaction designed to give the Orchestra a financial boost and protect Blossom’s natural surroundings, the Musical Arts Association sold 580 acres of the site’s undeveloped land to Cuyahoga Valley National Park in 2011.

Blossom is also widely used for popular music events, especially folk, rock, and country. The largest recorded show attendance at Blossom was for a Blood, Sweat and Tears concert in 1969, just one year after the venue's opening, totaling in 24,364. An unofficial estimate to a Pink Floyd concert in 1973 claims 32,000 were in attendance. The amphitheater has played host to many music festivals, Lollapalooza, Mayhem Festival, Ozzfest, and Vans Warped Tour. The Michael Stanley Band, intensely popular in Northeast Ohio, but virtually unknown elsewhere, set an attendance record, of 74,404, with four sold-out shows, on August 25–26 and 30–31, 1982. Rock artist James Taylor was the first artist to play double nights at the amphitheater in 1979, with a combined attendance of over 42,000.

== See also ==
- List of contemporary amphitheatres
- Live Nation
