= Dolora Zajick =

American mezzo-soprano opera singer

Dolora Zajick (born 24 March 1952) is an American mezzo-soprano opera singer who specializes in the Verdian repertoire. Zajick has been described as having "one of the greatest voices in the history of opera".

== Early life ==
Born in Salem, Oregon, but raised in Nevada, Zajick was a pre-med student at the University of Nevada, Reno and member of the Nevada Opera chorus, when her talent was first noticed. Zajick had taken a chorus class as an elective at UNR. She then studied voice with Ted Puffer, conductor of Nevada Opera, whom she credits with developing her vocal technique and guiding her in career moves, especially early in her performing career.

Zajick attended South Tahoe High School in South Lake Tahoe, California, and is a Wall of Honor Recipient. She graduated from the University of Nevada with a Bachelor's and a master's degree in music before going to New York for further music studies at the Manhattan School of Music. In 1982 she won the bronze medal at the 7th International Tchaikovsky Competition in Moscow, the only non-Soviet medalist that year and the first American musician to place in the contest in over twelve years. After this and graduating from the Manhattan School of Music, she was offered a place in the San Francisco Opera's Merola Program, she debuted with the San Francisco Opera as Azucena in Il Trovatore in 1986, which launched her to international acclaim.

== Career ==
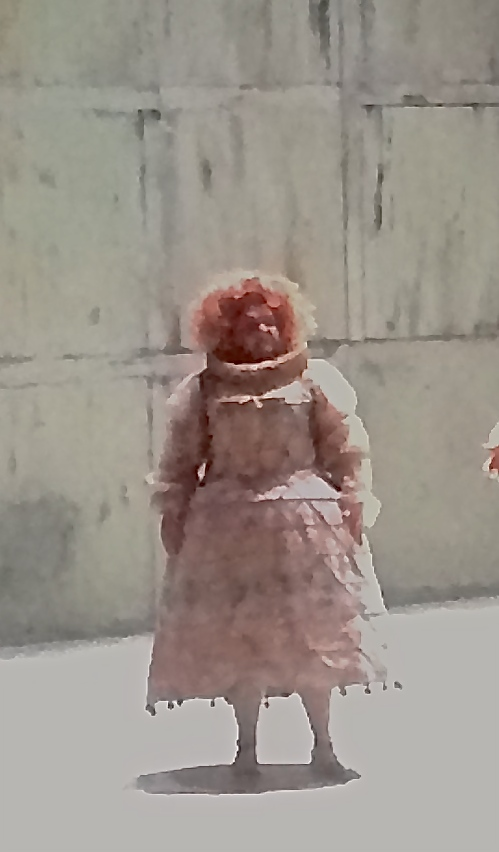
Zajick, performing one of her signature roles, the gypsy woman Azucena in Il Trovatore, Berlin, July 2016

In addition to the role of Azucena, Zajick is well known for her interpretations of Amneris and Eboli (in Verdi's Aida and Don Carlos respectively). Zajick has also performed in other Verdi roles, including Ulrica in Un ballo in maschera and Lady Macbeth in Macbeth. She has also appeared as the Princess in Cilèa's Adriana Lecouvreur, Marfa in Moussorgsky's Khovanshchina, Ježibaba in Dvořák's Rusalka, Joan of Arc in Tchaikovsky's The Maid of Orleans, Santuzza in Mascagni's Cavalleria rusticana, Adalgisa in Bellini's Norma, Dalila in Saint-Saëns' Samson et Dalila, the title role in Massenet's Hérodiade and Léonor in Donizetti's La favorite.

In 2005, she created the role of Elvira Griffiths in Tobias Picker's An American Tragedy at the Metropolitan Opera, New York. In recent years, while continuing to sing her established repertoire, she has added the roles of the Countess in Tchaikovsky's The Queen of Spades, La Zia Principessa in Puccini's Suor Angelica, made her Wagner debut as Ortrud in Lohengrin, her Poulenc debut as Madame de Croissy in Dialogues des Carmélites), and her Britten debut as Mrs. Grose in The Turn of the Screw.

== Composer ==
In August, 2014 Zajick's first public composition, an opera scene titled "Roads to Zion" was premiered at The Cathedral Basilica of St. Joseph in San Jose, CA. The work was written for performance during the celebrations by the Carmelite Order of the 500th anniversary of the birth of St Teresa of Avila and is available in a commercial recording. It sets a text derived from Psalm 84 and is in three parts: 1) "A Soul Yearns", 2) "A Soul Takes Flight" and 3) "A Soul Returns". The first and third parts contain dialogues between soloists and choir, while the middle movement is purely instrumental.

Reviewers praised the "accomplished vocal and instrumental writing ... that delivered its message in a resonant, almost beatific, glow" and noted that "this music created an intense experience. Its impressive orchestration and unified architectural design made it a most fascinating piece".

A second work, "Birdsong", was premiered by Chanticleer in March 2015 at the 2nd National Youth Choral Festival in San Francisco's Davies Symphony Hall. This piece is a setting of a poem from the anthology I Never Saw Another Butterfly.

== Recordings ==
Recording dates are used, rather than release dates.

=== CD ===
- 1986: Verdi's La forza del destino (Preziosilla) Orchestra e Coro del Teatro alla Scala, Riccardo Muti. EMI
- 1987: Verdi's Messa da Requiem Orchestra e Coro del Teatro alla Scala Riccardo Muti. EMI
- 1990: Verdi's Aida (Amneris) Metropolitan Opera Orchestra and Chorus, James Levine. Sony
- 1991: Verdi's Il trovatore (Azucena) Metropolitan Opera Orchestra and Chorus, James Levine. Sony
- 1991: Prokofiev's Ivan the Terrible/Alexander Nevsky (Nevsky) London Symphony Orchestra and Chorus, Mstislav Rostropovich. Sony
- 1992: Verdi's Don Carlo (Eboli) Metropolitan Opera Orchestra and Chorus, James Levine. Sony
- 1994: Massenet's Hérodiade (Hérodiade) San Francisco Opera Orchestra and Chorus, Valery Gergiev. Sony
- 1996: Metropolitan Opera Gala: James Levine's 25th Anniversary. Deutsche Grammophon CD
- 1998: Dvořák's Rusalka (Ježibaba) Czech Philharmonic Orchestra, Sir Charles Mackerras. Decca
- 1999: Dolora Zajick The art of the dramatic mezzo-soprano Royal Philharmonic Orchestra, Charles Rosenkrans. Telarc
- 2014: Living Water: celebrating St Teresa of Avila's 500th Birthday (including Roads to Zion), CD available from Carmel of Reno website

=== DVD and streaming video ===
- 1988: Verdi's Il trovatore (Azucena) with Eva Marton as Leonora. Metropolitan Opera, James Levine. Met Opera on Demand SD streaming video; also Deutsche Grammophon DVD
- 1989: Verdi's Aida (Amneris) with Aprile Millo as Aida. Metropolitan Opera, James Levine. Met Opera on Demand SD streaming video; also Deutsche Grammophon DVD
- 1996: James Levine's 25th Anniversary Metropolitan Opera Gala, Metropolitan Opera, James Levine. Deutsche Grammophon DVD B0004602-09
- 1998: Pavarotti's 30th Anniversary Gala. Metropolitan Opera, James Levine. Met Opera on Demand SD streaming video
- 2008: Verdi's Don Carlo (Eboli) Teatro alla Scala Orchestra and Chorus, Daniele Gatti. Hardy Classic Video
- 2009: Verdi's Aida (Amneris) with Violeta Urmana as Aida. Metropolitan Opera, Daniele Gatti. Met Opera on Demand HD streaming video; Decca DVD
- 2011: Verdi's Il trovatore (Azucena) with Sondra Radvanovsky as Leonora. Metropolitan Opera, Marco Armiliato. Met Opera on Demand HD streaming video; also Deutsche Grammophon DVD
- 2014: Dvořák's Rusalka (Jezibaba) with Renée Fleming as Rusalka. Metropolitan Opera, Yannick Nézet-Séguin. Met Opera on Demand HD streaming video
- 2015: Verdi's Il trovatore (Azucena) with Anna Netrebko as Leonora. Metropolitan Opera, Marco Armiliato. Met Opera on Demand HD streaming video
