= Soyazhe =

- Opera by Garland Anderson
- Librettist: Jamie Lee Cooper
- Language: English
- Premiere: July 28, 1979; Central City Opera, Denver

Soyazhe is an opera in one act by Garland Anderson. The opera uses an English language libretto by Jamie Lee Cooper and premiered at the Central City Opera in Denver, Colorado on July 28, 1979, with Joy Davidson in the title role. The opera tells a tale of necromancy and betrayal among a Navajo tribe. Music critic Bill Zakariasen wrote in his review of the opera in Musical America, "This muddled tale of necromancy among the Navajos only turned our understanding of these people back to a wigwam one. Anderson's music, despite its lack of authentic racial atmosphere, proved well-orchestrated, smoothly developed, and firmly attuned to the dramatic action."

== Roles ==
- Soyazhe (mezzo-soprano)
- Ruins, Soyazhe's father (tenor)
- Witch Slayer, a witch doctor (baritone)
- Bitter Water, Soyazhe's mother (soprano)
- Stands Alone, a young brave and Soyazhe's husband (tenor)
- Crier (tenor)
