= JaffeHolden Acoustics =

American consulting firm

JaffeHolden
- Industry: consulting firm
- Founded: 1968
- Founder: Christopher Jaffe
- Headquarters: Norwalk, Connecticut

JaffeHolden Acoustics, Inc. is a consulting firm which delivers Architectural Acoustics, Audio and Video Systems, and Information Technologies design services. Its clientele includes performance venues, houses of worship, educational institutions, museums, cruise ships, and legislative buildings.

== About Jaffe Holden ==
=== History ===
In 1968, Jaffe Holden Acoustics was founded by acoustician Christopher Jaffe in Norwalk, Connecticut. The company first grew from Jaffe’s discovery that lightweight tunable reflector panels placed in the reverberant stage towers of multi-use theatres increased orchestral liveness, intimacy and warmth. Since these designs allowed acousticians to place overhead ceiling reflectors closer to the musicians, the shells improved on stage hearing to the benefit of orchestral ensemble and sectional balance. Some early challenges for JaffeHolden were designing a shell for the Youth Symphony concerts on the South Lawn of the White House sponsored by Jacqueline Kennedy; renovations of Lewisohn Stadium for the Metropolitan Opera and the Hollywood Bowl for the Los Angeles Philharmonic; and the design for the first touring symphonic stage used by the New York Philharmonic for their innovative series of free parks concerts in 1965.

Early in the company’s history, while working on a grant for the National Endowment for the Arts, Jaffe realized that the elitist image of orchestral performance and the formal seating arrangement of the typical concert hall were actually reducing attendance at these events. Researching older halls such as the Concertgebouw in Amsterdam, JaffeHolden designed the first surround concert hall in the Western hemisphere, Sala Nezahualcoyotl Hall in Mexico City. JaffeHolden also developed the use of electronic reflections to provide needed aural information in specialized circumstances where physical acoustic solutions alone could not meet the required symphonic criteria due to budget constraints, building landmark restrictions and/or operational flexibility. Also known as ERES (Electronic Reflected Energy System), these systems have been successfully implemented in theaters and halls throughout the United States. Jaffe and current CEO Mark Holden’s "Concert Hall Shaper" revolutionized multi-use theater design in providing mixed-use theaters with the level of acoustic parameters found in a dedicated concert hall. This was first utilized in the Tokyo International Forum, and subsequently at the Bass Performance Hall in Fort Worth, Texas and the Thelma Gaylord Theater at the Oklahoma City Civic Center.

=== Recent Business ===
In 2008, Jaffe Holden Acoustics, Inc. expanded its consulting services to include information technology services. Services include the areas of telecommunications, data, voice and cable infrastructure and network technologies.

=== Current CEO ===
In 2005, Mark Holden became chairman of Jaffe Holden Acoustics, Inc. Educated at Duke University with a Bachelor of Science in Electrical Engineering, Mr. Holden has authored numerous papers and columns for major trade publications. He has lectured at Harvard University and the University of Miami. He is a member of the National Council of Acoustical Consultants and was elected Fellow of the Acoustical Society of America in 2004.

=== Principals ===
- Mark Holden, FASA, CEO, Acoustics
- Russell Cooper, Acoustics
- Mark Reber, PE, Acoustics

=== Locations ===
Jaffe Holden Acoustics Inc. has two main office locations:

- Norwalk, CT (Headquarters)
- Houston, TX

== Projects ==
=== Completed Projects ===
- Bass Performance Hall, Fort Worth, TX
- Detroit Orchestra Hall, Detroit, MI
- Kennedy Center Concert Hall and Opera House, Washington, DC
- McCaw Hall, Seattle, WA
- Severance Hall, Cleveland, OH
- Tokyo International Forum, Tokyo, Japan
- Zankel Hall at Carnegie Hall, New York, NY
- Alice Tully Hall, Lincoln Center for the Performing Arts, New York, NY
- Ford's Theatre, Washington, DC
- Guild Hall, East Hampton, NY
- Henry Miller Theater, New York, NY
- Juilliard School, Lincoln Center for the Performing Arts, New York, NY
- Richmond Hill Theatre, Richmond Hill, ON
- Virginia Performing Arts Center, Richmond, VA
- Bethel Woods Museum, Bethel, NY
- Broad Theatre, Santa Monica, CA
- The Grand Theatre, Kingston, Ontario
- Kaufman Center, New York, NY
- Kennedy Center, Eisenhower Theater, Washington, DC
- Long Center for the Performing Arts, Austin, TX
- Mark Taper Forum, Los Angeles, CA
- New Albany Performing Arts Center, New Albany, OH
- Sun Valley Pavilion, Sun Valley, ID

=== Notable Projects In Progress ===
As of 2013:

- Academy of Motion Picture Arts and Sciences Museum, Los Angeles, CA
- Museum of Westward Expansion inside the Gateway Arch, St. Louis, MO
- Federal Way Performing Arts Civic Center, Federal Way, WA
- Utah Performing Arts Center, Salt Lake City, UT

== See also ==
- Architectural acoustics
- Room acoustics
- Acoustical Society of America
