= Alan Opie =

British opera singer

Alan Opie OBE (born 22 March 1945) is a British baritone, primarily known as an opera singer.

== Education ==
Opie was born in Redruth, Cornwall, and attended Truro School. He went to Gonville and Caius College, Cambridge University as a choral student in 1963. He also studied at the Guildhall School of Music and Drama and the London Opera Centre before joining the Sadler's Wells Opera (now the English National Opera, ENO). He became a Principal baritone there while still a student.

== Opera career ==
Opie has also sung with the other major UK opera companies Scottish Opera, Opera North, Welsh National Opera, Glyndebourne Festival Opera and the Royal Opera House, Covent Garden. Internationally, he has performed in the opera houses of Paris, Amsterdam, Vienna, Brussels, Berlin, Chicago and Santa Fe and regularly appears at the Bayerische Staatsoper in Munich. In 1978, he sang Messias in Lyric Opera of Chicago's World Premiere production of Penderecki's Paradise Lost, which was also presented at La Scala in January 1979. He has also sung at the Bayreuth Festival. In 1996, Opie switched his status at the ENO from company member to regular guest, enabling him to make his début at La Scala, Milan. There he created the role of Outis in the opera of the same name by Luciano Berio.. In 2011 he performed Frank in Die Fledermaus for Welsh National Opera.

In March 2017, he performed the role of Arbace in Mozart's Idomeneo at the Metropolitan Opera in New York.

He has recorded for CBS, EMI, Hyperion, Chandos and Decca, winning Grammy Awards in 1996 and 1998 for his involvement in, respectively, recordings of Britten's Peter Grimes and Wagner's Die Meistersinger von Nürnberg.

== Awards ==
In 1997, his performance in the title role of Verdi's Falstaff earned Opie a nomination for the 1998 Laurence Olivier Award for Outstanding Achievement in Opera. He was appointed Officer of the Order of the British Empire (OBE) in the 2013 Birthday Honours for services to music.

== Personal life ==
Opie and his wife Kathleen (married since 1970) have a son and a daughter.

== Operatic roles ==
Performed and/or recorded, listed alphabetically:

Role	Opera	Composer
Aristæus I	The Mask of Orpheus	Birtwistle
various	Death in Venice	Britten
Balstrode	Peter Grimes	Britten
Beckmesser	Die Meistersinger von Nürnberg	Wagner
Chairman Mao	Madame Mao	Bright Sheng
Don Alfonso	Così fan tutte	Mozart
Don Carlo	Ernani	Verdi
Diomede	Troilus and Cressida	Walton
Eisenstein, Falke	Die Fledermaus	Johann Strauss II
Enrico	Lucia di Lammermoor	Donizetti
Falstaff, Ford	Falstaff	Verdi
Faninal	Der Rosenkavalier	Richard Strauss
Faraone	Mosè in Egitto	Rossini
Faust	Doktor Faust	Busoni
Fieramosca	Benvenuto Cellini	Berlioz
Figaro	Il Barbiere di Siviglia	Rossini
Forester	The Cunning Little Vixen	Janáček
Germont	La Traviata	Verdi
Malatesta	Don Pasquale	Donizetti
Marcello	La Bohème	Puccini
Marquis de la Force	Dialogues of the Carmelites	Poulenc
Melitone	La Forza del Destino	Verdi
Messias	Paradise Lost	Penderecki
Miller	Luisa Miller	Verdi
Montano	Otello	Verdi
Nabucco	Nabucco	Verdi
Outis	Outis	Berio
Papageno	Die Zauberflöte	Mozart
Paolo	Simon Boccanegra	Verdi
Rigoletto	Rigoletto	Verdi
Sancho Panza	Don Quichotte	Massenet
Sharpless	Madam Butterfly	Puccini
Sid	Albert Herring	Britten
Smirnov	The Bear	Walton
Der Spielmann	Königskinder	Humperdinck
Stiva	Anna Karenina	Hamilton
Taddeo	L'Italiana in Algeri	Rossini
Tonio	Pagliacci	Leoncavallo
Ulisse	Ulisse	Dallapiccola
Valentin	Faust	Gounod

== Selected concert works ==
(performed and/or recorded, listed alphabetically)

Work	Composer
Ein Deutsches Requiem	Brahms
Das Klagende Lied	Mahler
Elijah	Mendelssohn
Ezio	Handel
Hugh the Drover	Vaughan Williams
Oedipus Rex	Stravinsky
Requiem	Fauré
The Dream of Gerontius	Elgar
Ultima Rerum	Gerard Victory

== Selected discography ==
Grammy Award-winning recordings in bold.

Year	Work/s	Composer/s	Artists	Label
1991	Otello	Verdi	Chicago Symphony Orchestra et al. cond. Sir Georg Solti	Decca
1993	Bethlehem	Boughton	City of London Sinfonia et al. cond. Alan Melville	Hyperion
1994	Hugh the Drover	Vaughan Williams	Corydon Orchestra and Singers et al. cond. Matthew Best	Hyperion
1996	**Peter Grimes**	Britten	City of London Sinfonia et al. cond. Richard Hickox	Chandos
1997	**Die Meistersinger von Nürnberg**	Wagner	Chicago Symphony Orchestra and Chorus cond. Sir Georg Solti	Decca
1998	Pagliacci	Leoncavallo	London Philharmonic Orchestra et al. cond. David Parry	Chandos
2000	The Barber of Seville	Rossini	ENO Orchestra and Chorus cond. Gabriele Bellini	Chandos (recorded 1994)
2000	Rigoletto	Verdi	ENO Orchestra and Chorus cond. Mark Elder	Chandos
2002	Death in Venice	Britten	London Sinfonietta cond. Graeme Jenkins	Kultur DVD
2003	Peter Grimes	Britten	ENO Orchestra and Chorus cond. David Atherton	Kultur DVD
2003	Classical Brubeck	Dave Brubeck	Dave Brubeck Quartet et al.	Telarc
2004	Alan Opie sings Bel Canto Arias	various		Chandos

== Sources ==
- Sadie, Stanley, ed. (1992). The New Grove Dictionary of Opera vol 3, p. 714 article by Elizabeth Forbes. Oxford: Oxford University Press. ISBN 978-0-19-522186-2.
