= A Mirror for Witches =

1928 book by Esther Forbes

- Title page of the 1928 first edition
- Author: Esther Forbes
- Language: English
- Genre: Historical fiction
- Publication place: United States

A Mirror for Witches is a 1928 novel by American author Esther Forbes, dealing with the witch hunt in 17th Century New England. The book, which precedes by decades the more famous The Crucible by Arthur Miller, is still popular and remains in print. It pretends to be an authentic seventeenth century chronicle of a witch's life, based on contemporary sources.

The book has also been adapted for the stage, including as a ballet by Denis ApIvor (1952) and as an opera, Bilby's Doll by Carlisle Floyd (1976).

== Synopsis ==
Doll Bilby is a young girl, denounced by a relative as being a witch, and then caught up in the hysteria of the Salem witch trials.

== See also ==
- Cultural depictions of the Salem Witch Trials
