= William Stone (baritone) =

American opera singer

William Stone (born March 12, 1944, Goldsboro, North Carolina) is an American operatic baritone. He is a graduate of Duke University (B.A., 1966) and University of Illinois at Urbana-Champaign (M.M. 1968, D.M.A. 1979). He made his professional operatic debut in 1975 and his international debut in 1977.

He was inducted as a National Patron of Delta Omicron, an international professional music fraternity on April 1, 2003.

William Stone is a Vocal Instructor at the Academy of Vocal Arts in Philadelphia, Pennsylvania and the Curtis Institute of Music. He was Professor of Voice and Opera at the Boyer College of Music and Dance, Temple University, from September, 2005 through June, 2010.

== Debuts ==
- Lyric Opera of Chicago, world premiere of Paradise Lost, (Adam), 29 November 1978.
- New York City Opera, La traviata (Giorgio Germont), October 1981.
- Seattle Opera, Don Carlos (Rodrigue), July 1993.
- Metropolitan Opera, Roméo et Juliette (Capulet), 8 April 1998.

== Recordings ==
- Mozart: Mass in C minor - Edith Wiens (soprano), Delores Ziegler (mezzo-soprano), John Aler (tenor), William Stone (baritone), Atlanta Symphony Orchestra and Chorus, Robert Shaw (conductor). Label: Telarc.
- Schubert: Mass no 2 in G major, D 167 - Dawn Upshaw (soprano), David Gordan (tenor), William Stone (baritone), Atlanta Symphony Orchestra and Chorus, Robert Shaw (conductor). Label: Telarc.
- Walton: Belshaazar's Feast - William Stone (baritone), Atlanta Symphony Orchestra and Chorus, Robert Shaw (conductor). Label: Telarc.

== Notes and references ==
- Bargreen, Melinda (July 25, 1993). "Verdi's 'Don Carlos' Is Lengthy But Luscious". The Seattle Times.
- Henahan, Donal (October 18, 1981). "City Opera: 'Taviata' with Diana Soviero". The New York Times.
- Metropolitan Opera Archives, "Stone, William (Baritone)", MetOpera Database. Retrieved on 26 December 2008.
- Ross, Alex, "Comfortable Shoes and Other Tricks of a Baritone", New York Times, 29 September 1992. Retrieved on 26 December 2008.
- Swan, Annalyn, "Heavenly Bore", Time Magazine, 11 December 1978. Retrieved on 26 December 2008.
