= Bilby's Doll =

- Opera by Carlisle Floyd
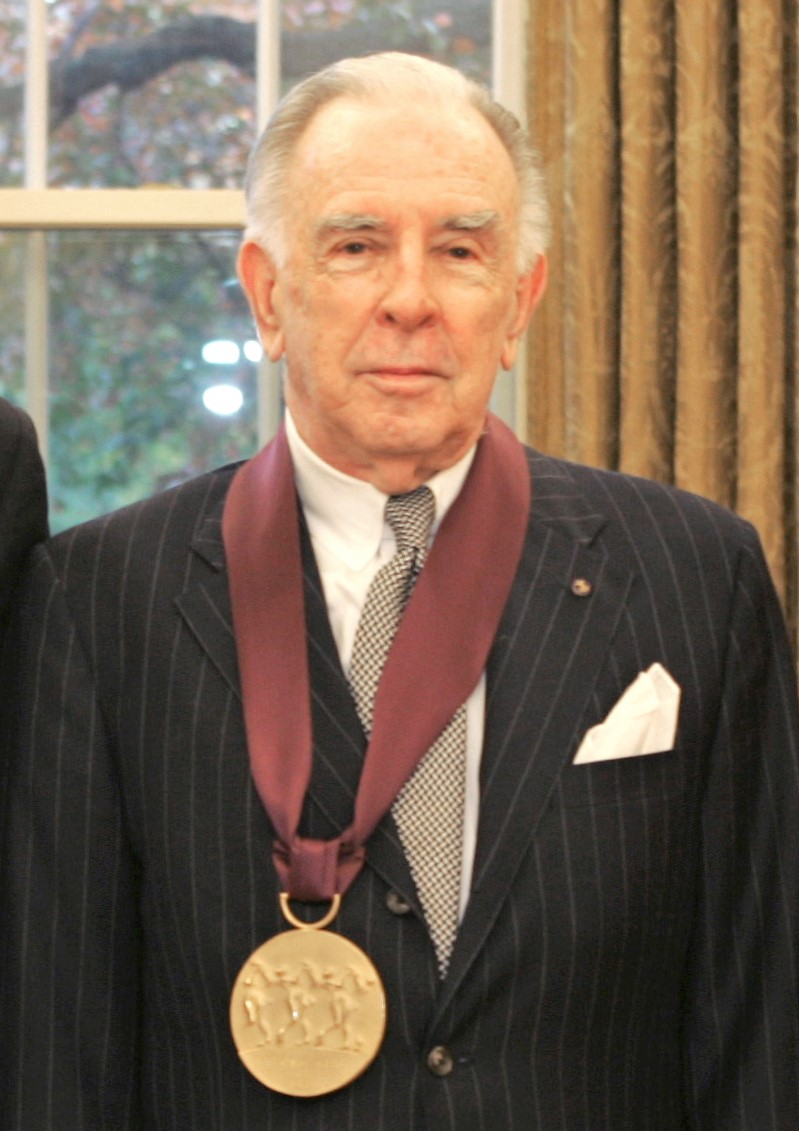
- Carlisle Floyd in 2004 with the National Medal of Arts
- Librettist: Floyd
- Language: English
- Based on: A Mirror for Witches by Esther Forbes
- Premiere: February 27, 1976; Houston Grand Opera

Bilby's Doll is an opera in three acts composed by Carlisle Floyd. The libretto is based on the 1928 American novel A Mirror for Witches by Esther Forbes.

Bilby's Doll was Floyd's eighth opera. It had its premiere on February 27, 1976, at the Houston Grand Opera in a production by David Pountney with sets by Ming Cho Lee. The original cast, conducted by Christopher Keene, included Catherine Malfitano, Joy Davidson, Thomas Paul, and Jack Trussel. Houston Grand's general director David Gockley commissioned the work in honor of the US Bicentennial.

== Synopsis ==
Bilby's Doll is the story of Doll Bilby, a French orphan whose spirituality and imagination collide with the hostility and practical ideals of the Puritan colony where she is raised by her foster parents.

Doll was brought to Massachusetts from France by Jared Bilby, her foster father. She declines a marriage proposal from Titus Thumb, a young ministerial student, saying that her natural parents were burned as witches in France and she worries that she might also become a witch. Instead, she meets and marries a man who pretends he is a demon, but who is later revealed to be the estranged and opportunistic son of the minister Zelley, Doll's friend and supporter.

Although she is at first devastated by the revelation of her lover as a mortal, Doll's belief that her husband is a demon is restored as she dies giving birth in a jail cell.

== Roles ==
Role	Voice type	Premiere cast, 27 February 1976
Jared Bilby (a former sea captain)	bass	Thomas Paul
Doll Bilby (the Bilbys' foster daughter)	soprano	Catherine Malfitano
Hannah Bilby (Jared Bilby's wife)	mezzo-soprano	Joy Davidson
Deacon Thumb (a prosperous farmer)	tenor	Thomas Page
Titus Thumb (his son)	baritone	Alan Titus
Mr. Zelley (a clergyman)	bass-baritone	Tom Fox
Goody Goochy (the village midwife-undertaker)	contralto	Nell Evans
Mrs. Thumb (wife of Deacon Thumb)	soprano	Barrie Smith
Shad	tenor	Jacque Trussel
Mr. Increase Mather	bass	David Cornell
Silas (the tavern keeper)	baritone	Jon Enloc
Town Crier	tenor	
Sorrow (twin daughter of Deacon and Mrs Thumb)	soprano	
Labour (twin daughter of Deacon and Mrs Thumb)	soprano	
First Suitor (suitor of the widowed Hannah Bilby)	tenor	
Second Suitor (suitor of the widowed Hannah Bilby)	baritone	
Mr. Kleaver (the village doctor)	baritone	
Captain Buzzey (the local constable)	baritone	
Young Boy	non-singing	
Goody Greene	non-singing	
A Servant Boy	non-singing	
Judge Bride	non-singing	
Judge Lollimour	non-singing	
People of Cowan Corners and Salem, Deputies, Judges' retinue
