= Tom Fox (baritone) =

American operatic baritone

Tom Fox is an American operatic baritone who has had an active international performance career that has spanned five decades. He has sung leading roles at many of the world's major opera houses, including the Berlin State Opera, La Scala, and the Metropolitan Opera. While he has performed a diverse range of roles in numerous languages during his career, he has become particularly associated with the works of Richard Wagner.

== Education and career ==
Fox was trained at the University of Cincinnati – College-Conservatory of Music where he was a pupil of Italian bass Italo Tajo. He began his stage career performing in the opera chorus and in smaller secondary roles at the Cincinnati Opera from 1972 to 1980. He was a member of that company's Young Artist Program from 1978 to 1980. He progressed to leading roles in Cincinnati; including portrayals of Basilio in The Barber of Seville, Dulcamara in L'elisir d'amore, Escamillo in Carmen, Scarpia in Tosca, Sharpless in Madame Butterfly, and Timur in Turandot. Most recently he was seen with the Cincinnati Opera in 2010 as Iago in Verdi's Otello.

Fox's first performance of note came in 1975 at the Houston Grand Opera when he created the role of Mr. Zelley in the world premiere of Carlisle Floyd's Bilby's Doll. In 1981 he made his European debut at the Frankfurt Opera as Orestes in Elektra. That same year he portrayed the title role in Mozart's Don Giovanni at the Hessisches Staatstheater Wiesbaden. Debuts in leading roles with other international opera houses followed, including the Hamburg State Opera (1983), the Welsh National Opera (1985), the Canadian Opera Company (1986), the Berlin State Opera (1987), the Teatro Colón (1987), the Théâtre des Champs-Élysées (1988), the Seattle Opera (1989), and the Pittsburgh Opera (1989) among others.

In 1990 Fox made his debut at the San Francisco Opera as Alberich in The Ring Cycle. In 1991 he returned to the SFO to portray Ryuji Tsukazaki in the United States premiere of Hans Werner Henze's Das Verratene Meer. That same year he made his debut at the Teatro Regio Torino as Giancotto in Zandonai Francesca da Rimini. In 1993 he made his debut at the Metropolitan Opera as Alberich in Siegfried, and appeared for the first time at the Lyric Opera of Chicago as Scarpia to Maria Guleghina's Tosca. He returned to the Met several times over the next two decades, most recently as Dr. Kolenaty in The Makropulos Affair in 2012.

In 1994 Fox made his debut at the Teatro Comunale di Bologna as Baron Jaroslav Prus in The Makropulos Affair. In 1995 he made his first appearances at the Salzburg Festival (Lulu), the Bavarian State Opera (as Klingsor Parsifal), and at the Municipal Theatre of Santiago (as Wotan in Die Walküre). In 1996 he returned to Santiago as The Wanderer in Siegfried and portrayed Pizarro in Fidelio at the Salzburg Festival. In 1998 he made his debut at the Los Angeles Opera as Jokanaan in Salome.

More recent engagements for Fox include The Speaker in The Magic Flute at the Metropolitan Opera (2011), Klingsor in Parsifal at the English National Opera (2011) and the BBC Proms (2012), the title role in Giorgio Battistelli's Richard III at the Grand Théâtre de Genève, (2012), Wotan in The Ring Cycle at the Grand Théâtre de Genève (2013-2014), the Water Sprite in Rusalka at the North Carolina Opera (2014), and Alexander Petrowitsch Gorjantschikow in From the House of the Dead at the Berlin State Opera (2014). His scheduled 2015 engagements include the roles of Abraham Lincoln / Lyndon B Johnson in Philip Glass' Appomattox at the Washington National Opera, Barone Douphol in La traviata at the Festspielhaus Baden-Baden, and The Old Duke in Guntram with the Washington Concert Opera.

== Personal life ==
Fox resides in Pawleys Island, South Carolina with his wife, ballet and modern dancer Ilka Doubek. They are the parents of model Lida Fox.
