= Ted Puffer =

American singer, voice teacher and translator

Merle "Ted" Puffer (15 October 1928 – 22 October 2003) was an American singer, voice teacher and translator.

He taught the mezzo-soprano Dolora Zajick when she was launching her career.

With his wife Deena Puffer, he translated The Merry Widow into English, producing a libretto favored by some singers.

He was the founder of the Nevada Opera, and its artistic director through the 1998/99 season. He taught in the music department of the University of Nevada, Reno from 1966 to 1994, and served as chair of the department. In 1965, Puffer recorded two albums of Charles Ives Songs on Folkways Records. From 1994 until his death in 2003 he was on the voice faculty of the Manhattan School of Music in New York City. He also founded the Boston Comic Opera, The Milwaukee Opera, and the Salt Lake Opera in Logan, Utah. His nickname was Johnny "Opera" Seed for growing so many companies.

The Puffers' daughter, Monica Harte, sings professionally and teaches singing, and co-directs the Remarkable Theater Brigade.

== Selected discography ==
- Charles Ives Songs, Vol. 1: 1894-1915 (Folkways, 1965)
- Charles Ives Songs, Vol. 2: 1915-1925 (Folkways, 1965)
