= Paradise Lost (Penderecki) =

Opera by Krzysztof Penderecki

- Opera by Krzysztof Penderecki
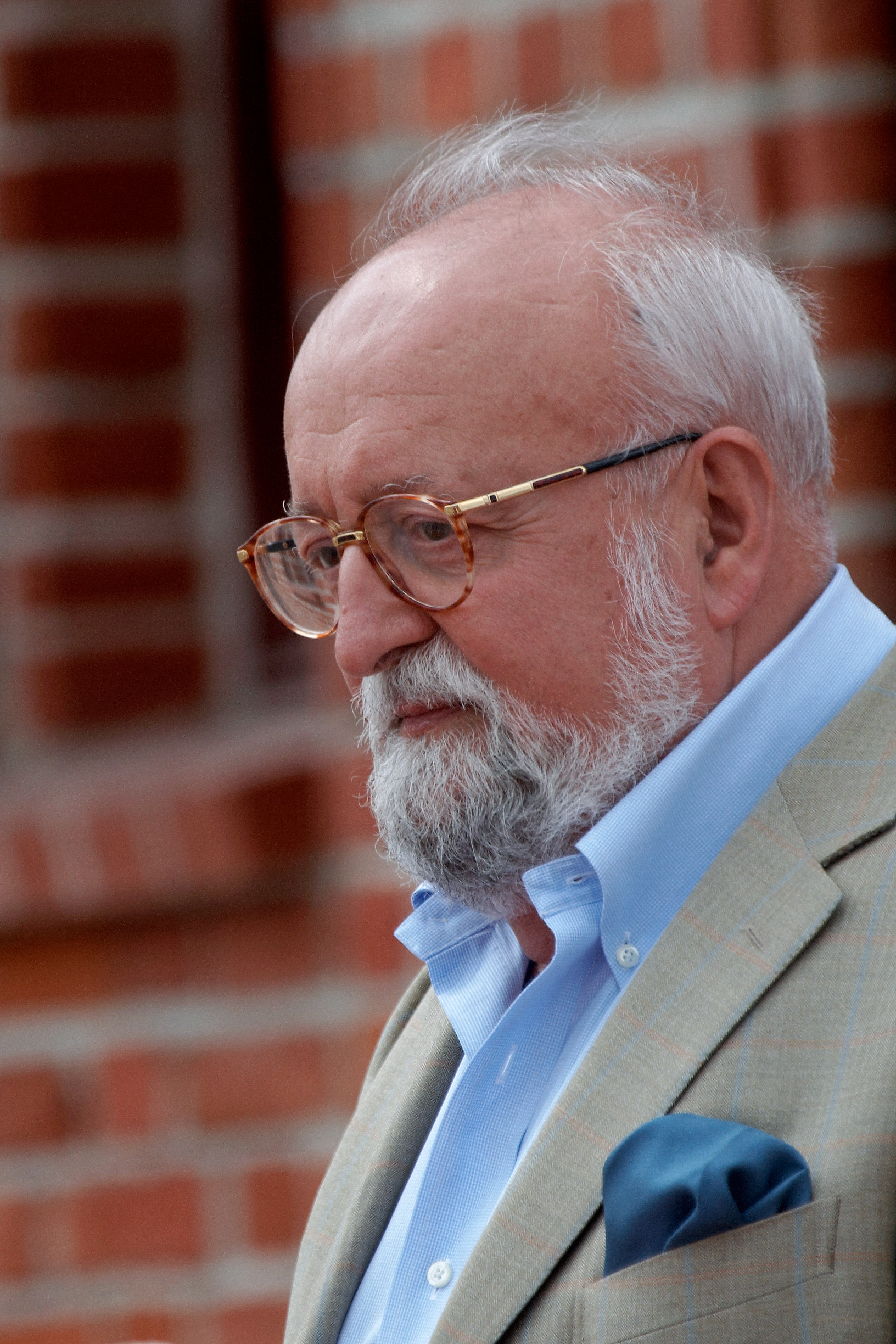
- The composer in 2008
- Description: Sacra Rappresentazione
- Librettist: Christopher Fry
- Language: English
- Based on: "Paradise Lost" by John Milton
- Premiere: 29 November 1978; Lyric Opera of Chicago

Paradise Lost is an opera in two acts with music by Krzysztof Penderecki and an English libretto by Christopher Fry. The opera is based on the 1667 epic poem of the same name by Milton. Penderecki himself characterized the work as a Sacra Rappresentazione (sacred representation) rather than an opera. He wrote the opera on commission for the 1976 US Bicentennial celebrations. The first performance took place on 29 November 1978, at the Lyric Opera of Chicago. The same production was presented at La Scala, Milan, on 31 January 1979.

The opera is set in heaven, hell, and on earth at the dawn of creation, and is divided into 42 scenes.

== Roles ==
Role	Voice type	Premiere cast, 29 November 1978 (Conductor: Bruno Bartoletti)
John Milton	speaker	Arnold Moss
Adam	baritone	William Stone
Eve	soprano	Ellen Shade
Satan	bass-baritone	Peter Van Ginkel
Beelzebub	tenor	Michael Ballam
Moloch	baritone	William Powers
Belial	tenor	Melvin Lowrey
Mammon	baritone	Edward Huls
Death	countertenor	Paul Esswood
Sin	mezzo-soprano	Joy Davidson
Zephon	soprano	Susan Brummell
Ithuriel		John Patrick Thomas
Gabriel	tenor	James Schwisow
Raphael		Dale Terbeek
Messias	baritone	Alan Opie
Michael	tenor	Frank Little
Voices of God		John Brandstetter
Voices of God		David Howell
Voices of God		Edward Huls
Voices of God		Daniel McConnell
Voices of God		William Mitchell
