= Howard Swan =

American choral conductor

Howard Shelton Swan (March 19, 1906 – September 19, 1995) was an American choral conductor, tenor, music educator, and writer on music. A highly influential figure in American choral music during the 20th century, Swan was sometimes referred to as the "Dean of American Choral Directors" during his lifetime. A choral director and professor of voice at Occidental College from 1934 through 1971, his choirs at Occidental gained international critical acclaim. Conductor Robert Shaw stated about Swan's choral work at Occidental that it was "the most distinguished and varied choral repertoire at the highest level of performance in American collegiate history."

After retiring from Occidental in 1971, Swan worked as the coordinator of graduate music studies at California State University, Fullerton from 1971-1977, and after that as a lecturer in choral music and conducting at the University of California, Irvine. The book Conscience of a Profession: Howard Swan, Choral Director and Teacher (Chapel Hill, N C, 1987) is a collection of his speeches and writings from 1945 through 1986. In 1987 the national conference of the American Choral Directors Association was a dedicated symposium on Howard Swan and his work as a choral director and writer on music. In 1995 he was the recipient of the Robert Shaw Choral Award.

He died in Irvine, California on September 18, 1995.

== Early life and education ==
Born Howard Shelton Swan in Denver, Colorado, Swan was the son of D. Shelton Swan and Ethel Katherine Miller Swan. His father was a math teacher who eventually became the principal of Fairfax High School in Los Angeles, California The family moved to Southern California before Howard began elementary school, and in 1913 the family established a residence in Hollywood, California. Howard attended Hollywood High School (HHS) where he studied violin and sang in the choir.

After graduating from HHS, Swan entered Pomona College in 1923 where he majored in history and minored in political science. At Pomona he sang in the university's choir and studied singing with Ralph Lyman. In his senior year he became the director of the college's glee club while the faculty member who usually directed the ensemble was on a year long sabbatical. After graduating from Pomona with a bachelor's degree in history, he entered Claremont Graduate University where he earned a Master of Science degree in Psychology and Education.

During both his undergraduate and graduate studies, Swan supported himself financially through his work as a tenor soloist in churches and synagogues. While in graduate school he studied singing with John Smallman, the founder and conductor of both the Los Angeles Bach Festival and the Los Angeles Oratorio Society. He began to sing professionally as a member of Smallman's vocal quartet on the radio, and as a tenor soloist in concerts at Los Angeles venues like the Hollywood Bowl and on the radio. During this time he studied the writings of vocal pedagogues William Vennard and Douglas Stanley; both of whom greatly influenced his own vocal technique and philosophy towards singing instruction later in his career. In summers of 1933 and 1934 he studied choral conducting with the Catholic priest Father William J. Finn, founder of the Paulist Choristers and a nationally recognized choir conductor of the early 20th century, at Loyola College.

At the age of 27, Swan contracted a virus which paralyzed one of his vocal folds which ended his singing career. Four years later, in the summer of 1937, he studied choral conducting with John Finley Williamson, the founder of Westminster Choir College, at his masterclasses in San Francisco. Williamson took an interest in Swan due to the unique vocal issues he was having, and he began to work with Swan to regain his singing voice and improve his speaking voice. The two men developed a close friendship, and Williamson became Swan's mentor with Swan observing hundreds of voice lessons given by Williamson over many years. In 1969, Swan regained the use of his once paralyzed vocal fold after receiving teflon injections which greatly improved the richness and quality of his voice.

== Choral conducting ==
Swan's career as a choral conductor began at Eagle Rock High School in Los Angeles, where he was hired as a social studies teacher in 1929. He became director of the school's boys glee club and established the first mixed SATB chorus at the school. Two years after establishing the former group, he founded the first high school choral festival in Southern California. One of his students in these choirs at Eagle Rock was Robert Shaw, who grew up to become a world renowned conductor in his own right. From 1933-1940 Swan served as the choir director of Highland Park Presbyterian Church in Los Angeles. And later served as the music director at the large and influential Pasadena Presbyterian Church. Swan's association with Occidental College began in 1933, when he was invited to have his choir from Highland Park perform at the college's commencement ceremony after the college's own choir was unable to perform due to a medical emergency suffered by their musical director. Many of the college's faculty members sang in this chorus, and the good will established from this event led to Swan being hired as a non-faculty member in 1934 to direct the Men's and Women's Glee Clubs at the college. In 1935 he joined the music faculty at Occidental as a full time professor; at which point he left his post as a teacher at Eagle Rock High School. He remained a professor at the college until his retirement in 1971 where his work included directing multiple choirs at the college, teaching courses on choral conducting, choral literature, and church music, and teaching voice. One of his voice students at Occidental was Grammy Award nominated bass Thomas Paul who would later have a distinguished career in operas and concerts in addition to working as a voice teacher on the faculty at the Eastman School of Music.

After retiring from Occidental in 1971, Swan worked as the coordinator of graduate music studies at California State University, Fullerton from 1971-1977, and after that as a lecturer in choral music and conducting at the University of California, Irvine. The book Conscience of a Profession: Howard Swan, Choral Director and Teacher (Chapel Hill, N C, 1987) is a collection of his speeches and writings from 1945 through 1986. In 1987 the national conference of the American Choral Directors Association was a dedicated symposium on Howard Swan and his work as a choral director and writer on music. In 1995 he was the recipient of the Robert Shaw Choral Award.
