= Carnegie Hall =

Concert venue in Manhattan, New York

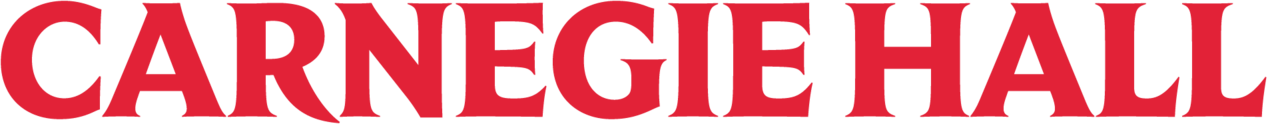

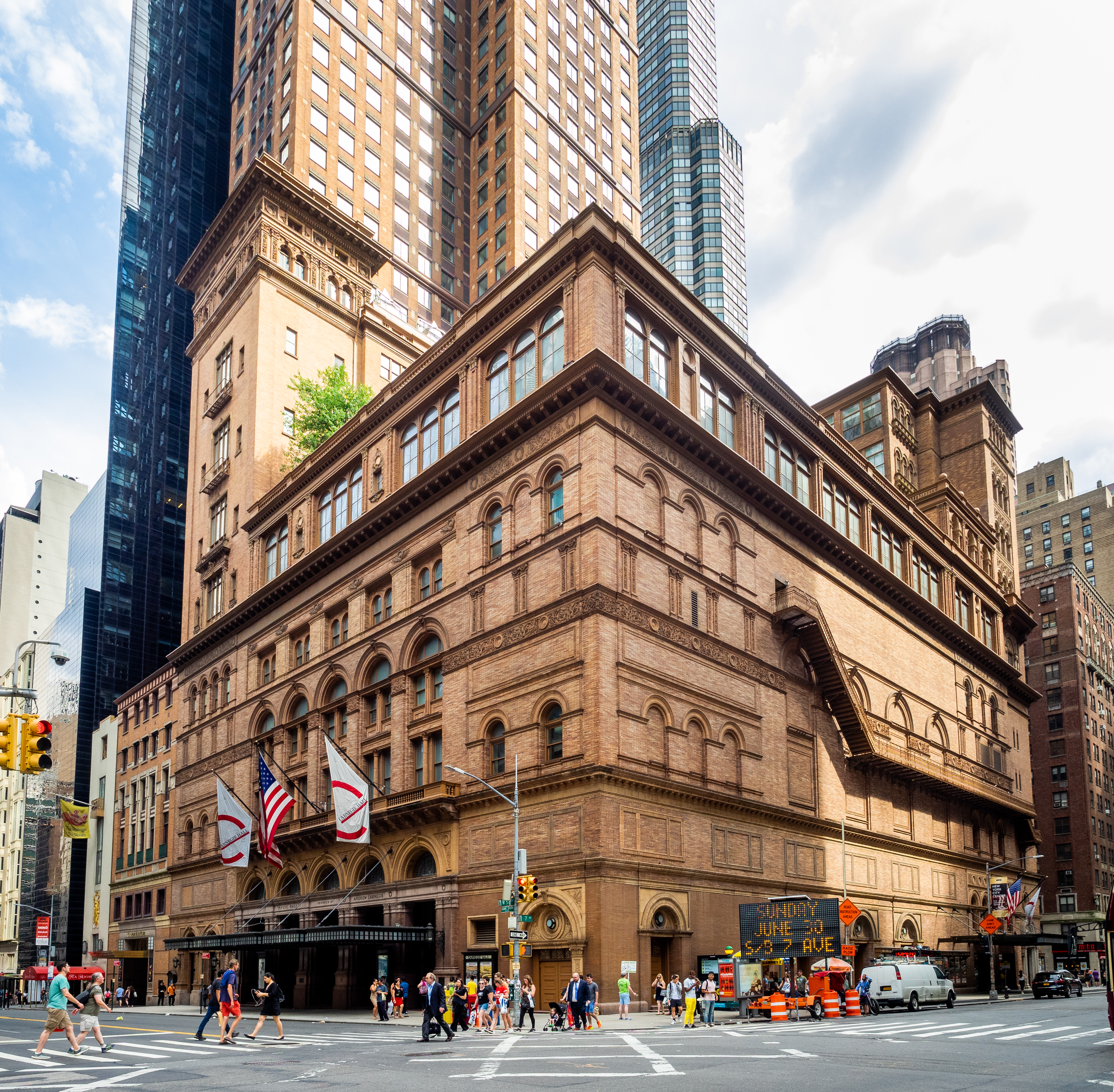
- Carnegie Hall in 2019
- Interactive map of Carnegie Hall
- Address: 881 Seventh Avenue (at 57th Street); Manhattan, New York; United States
- Coordinates: 40°45′54″N 73°58′48″W
- Owner: Government of New York City
- Operator: Carnegie Hall Corporation
- Capacity: Stern Auditorium: 2,790; Zankel Hall: 599; Weill Recital Hall: 268
- Type: Concert hall
- Public transit: Subway: 57th Street–Seventh Avenue

Construction
- Opened: April 1, 1891; 135 years ago (first facility); May 5, 1891; 135 years ago (official opening)
- Architect: William Tuthill
- Builder: Andrew Carnegie

Website
- carnegiehall.org
- Carnegie Hall
- U.S. National Register of Historic Places
- U.S. National Historic Landmark
- New York State Register of Historic Places
- New York City Landmark
- Architectural style: Renaissance Revival
- NRHP reference No.: 66000535
- NYSRHP No.: 06101.000409
- NYCL No.: 0278

Significant dates
- Added to NRHP: October 15, 1966
- Designated NHL: December 29, 1962
- Designated NYSRHP: June 23, 1980
- Designated NYCL: June 20, 1967

Carnegie Hall (/ˈkɑːrnɪɡi/ KAR-nig-ee) (Note: Although founder Andrew Carnegie pronounced his surname /kɑːrˈnɛɡi/ kar-NEG-ee, with the stress on the second syllable, the building is pronounced with the stress on the first syllable of Carnegie.) is a concert venue at 881 Seventh Avenue, between 56th and 57th Streets, in Midtown Manhattan, New York City. Designed by architect William Burnet Tuthill and built by its namesake, industrialist and philanthropist Andrew Carnegie, the venue is one of the most prestigious in the world for both classical music and popular music. Carnegie Hall has its own artistic programming, development, and marketing departments and presents about 250 performances each season. It is also rented out to performing groups, though it has not had a resident company since the New York Philharmonic moved to Lincoln Center in 1962.

The Carnegie Hall complex has three auditoriums. The largest one is the Stern Auditorium, a five-story auditorium with 2,790 seats. Also part of the complex are the 599-seat Zankel Hall, located below ground on Seventh Avenue, as well as the 268-seat Joan and Sanford I. Weill Recital Hall on 57th Street. Besides the auditoriums, Carnegie Hall contains offices on its top stories.

Carnegie Hall, originally the Music Hall, was constructed between 1889 and 1891 as a venue shared by the Oratorio Society of New York and the New York Symphony Society. The hall was owned by the Carnegie family until 1925, after which Robert E. Simon and then his son, Robert E. Simon Jr., became owners. Carnegie Hall was renovated multiple times throughout its history, including in the 1940s and 1980s. It was proposed for demolition in the 1950s when the Philharmonic's planned relocation to Lincoln Center was announced, but was saved by a public campaign led by Isaac Stern. Carnegie Hall is a National Historic Landmark and a New York City designated landmark.

== Site ==
Carnegie Hall is on the east side of Seventh Avenue between 56th Street and 57th Street, two blocks south of Central Park, in Midtown Manhattan, New York City. The site covers 27,618 square feet (2,565.8 m^{2}). Its lot is 200 feet (61 m) wide, covering the entire width of the block between 56th Street to the south and 57th Street to the north, and extends 150 feet (46 m) eastward from Seventh Avenue.

Carnegie Hall shares the city block with the Carnegie Hall Tower, Russian Tea Room, and Metropolitan Tower to the east. It is cater-corner from the Osborne apartment building. It also faces the Rodin Studios and 888 Seventh Avenue to the west; Alwyn Court, The Briarcliffe, the Louis H. Chalif Normal School of Dancing, and One57 to the north; the Park Central Hotel to the southwest; and CitySpire and New York City Center to the southeast. Right outside the hall is an entrance to the New York City Subway's 57th Street–Seventh Avenue station, served by the N, Q, R, and W trains.

Carnegie Hall is part of a former artistic hub around a two-block section of West 57th Street between Sixth Avenue and Broadway. The hub had been developed during the late 19th and early 20th centuries. Its opening in 1891 directly contributed to the development of the hub. The area contains several buildings constructed as residences for artists and musicians, such as 130 and 140 West 57th Street, the Osborne, and the Rodin Studios. In addition, the area contained the headquarters of organizations such as the American Fine Arts Society, the Lotos Club, and the American Society of Civil Engineers. By the 21st century, the artistic hub had largely been replaced with Billionaires' Row, a series of luxury skyscrapers around the southern end of Central Park.

== Architecture and venues ==
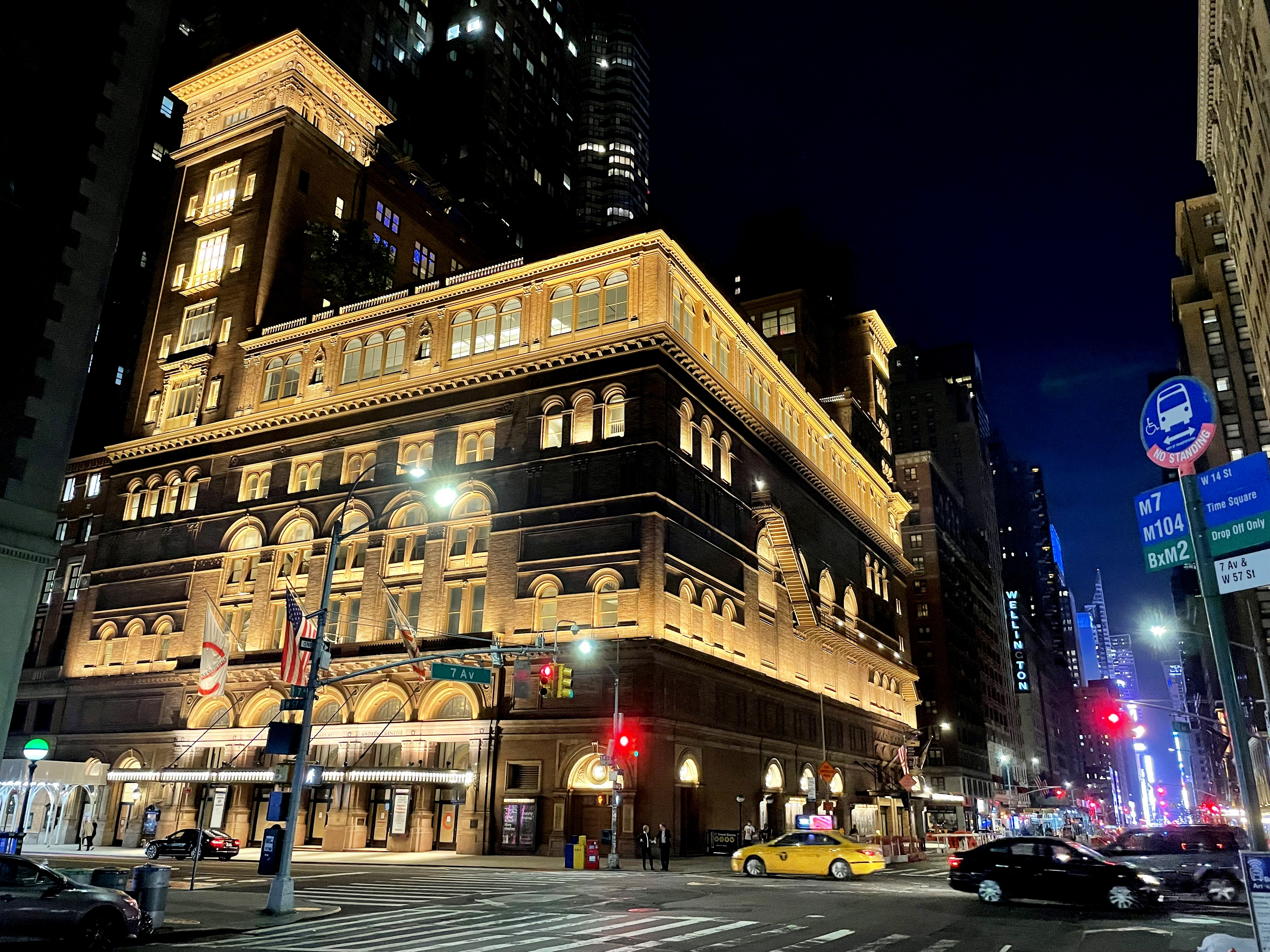
Original building at night

Carnegie Hall was designed primarily by William Tuthill, with assistance from Richard Morris Hunt and Adler & Sullivan, in a modified Italian Renaissance style. While the 34-year-old Tuthill was relatively unknown as an architect, he was an amateur cellist and a singer, which may have led to him getting the commission. Dankmar Adler of Adler & Sullivan—with his extensive experience in designing music halls and theaters, having just completed Chicago's Auditorium Building—was the acoustical consultant. Carnegie Hall was constructed with heavy masonry bearing walls, as lighter structural steel framework was not widely used when the building was completed. The walls measure 4 feet (1.2 m) thick in some places, while the floor slabs, 2 feet (0.61 m) thick, are made of cement and hollow tiles.

Carnegie Hall is composed of three structures arranged in an "L" shape; each structure contains one of the hall's performance spaces. The original building, which houses the Isaac Stern Auditorium, is an eight-story rectangular building at the corner of Seventh Avenue and 57th Street, measuring 150 feet (46 m) along the street and 175 feet (53 m) along the avenue. The 16-story eastern wing contains the Weill Recital Hall and is located along 57th Street. The 13-story southern wing, at Seventh Avenue and 56th Street, contains Zankel Hall. Except at the eighth floor, all three structures have floor levels at different heights.

=== Facade ===
Carnegie Hall was designed from the outset with a facade of Roman brick. The facade was decorated with a large number of Renaissance details. Most of the exterior walls are covered in reddish brown brick, though decorative elements such as band courses, pilasters, and arches are made of architectural terracotta originally by the New York Architectural Terra-Cotta Company. As originally designed, the terracotta and brick were both brown, and the pitched roof was made of corrugated black tile, but this was later replaced with the eighth floor.

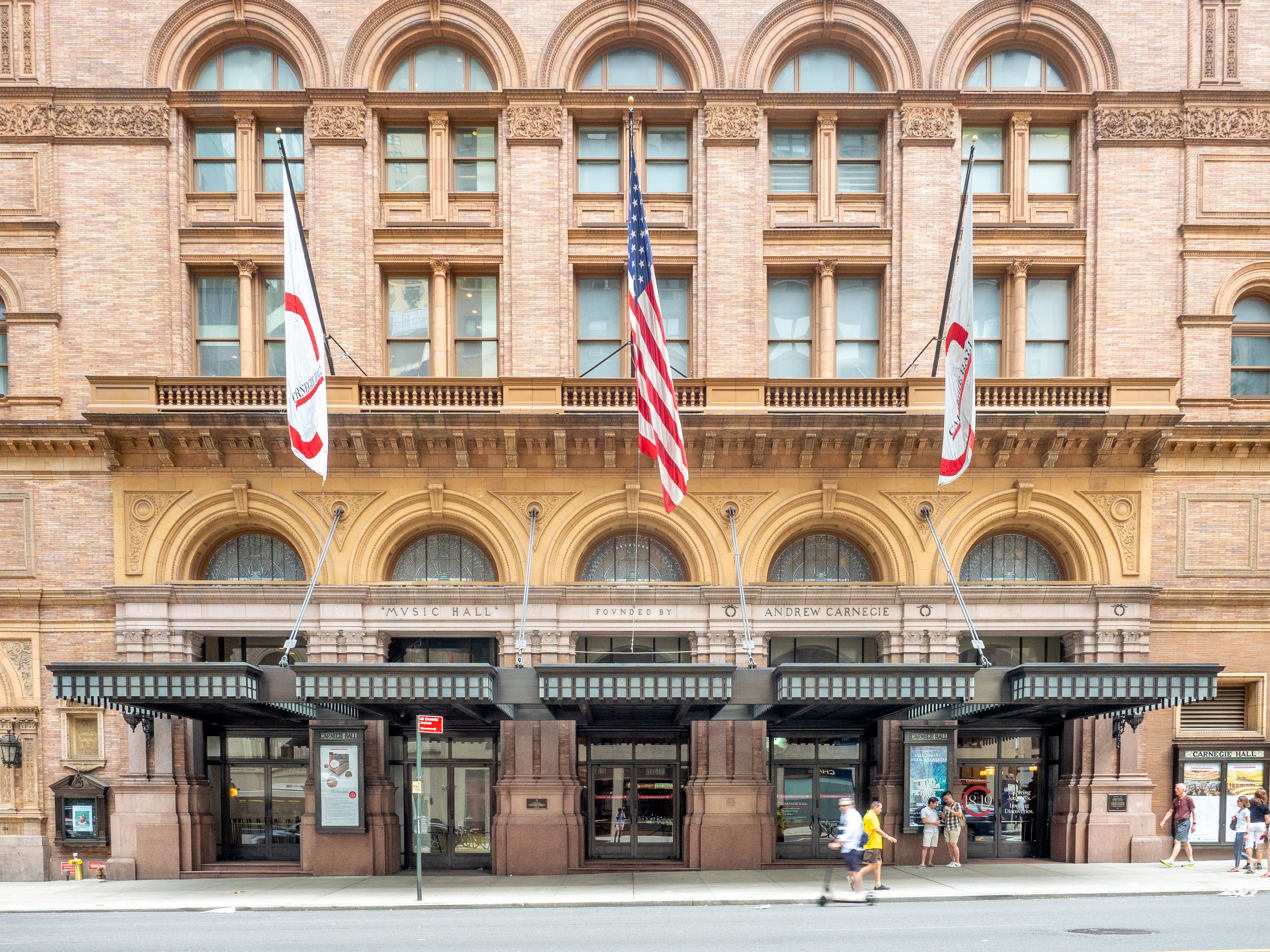
The main entrance has five arches at the first floor and its mezzanine, with another arcade above it.

The original section of the building is divided into three horizontal sections. The lowest section of the building comprises the first floor and the first-floor mezzanine, above which is a heavy cornice with modillions. The main entrance of Carnegie Hall is placed in what was originally the center of the primary facade on 57th Street. It consists of an arcade with five large arches, originally separated by granite pilasters. An entablature, with the words "Music Hall Founded by Andrew Carnegie", runs across the loggia at the springing of the arches. The center three arches lead directly to the Stern Auditorium's lobby, while the two outer arches lead to staircases to upper floors. On either side of the main entrance are smaller doorways (one on the west and two on the east), topped by blank panels at the mezzanine. There are five similar doorways on Seventh Avenue. The original backstage entrance is at 161 West 56th Street.

On the third and fourth floors, above the main entrance, is a two-and-a-half story arcade on 57th Street with five round-headed arches. A balcony with a balustrade is carried on console brackets in front of this arcade. Each arch has a horizontal terracotta transom bar above the third floor; two third-floor windows separated by a Corinthian column; and two fourth-floor windows separated by a pilaster. A broad terracotta frieze runs above the fourth floor, at the springing of the arches. To either side of the arcade, there are two tall round-arched windows on the second floor; those on the east flank a blind arch. There are pairs of pilasters on the fourth-floor mezzanine, above which is a string course. The Seventh Avenue facade is similar in design, but the openings are filled with brick, and the arcade at the center of the Seventh Avenue facade has four arches.

The sixth floor, at the center of the 57th Street facade, contains five square openings, each with a pair of round-arched windows. On either side of these five openings, there are round-arched windows, arranged as in a shallow loggia. There are four arched windows on the eastern portion of the sixth floor, as well as two arches on the west portion, which flank a blind arch. A frieze and cornice run above this floor. The seventh floor was originally a mansard roof. As part of an 1890s alteration, the mansard was replaced with a vertical wall resembling a continuous arcade. The seventh floor is topped by balustrades with decorated columns. The flat roof was converted into a roof garden with kitchen and service rooms. Carnegie Hall was also extended to the corner of Seventh Avenue and 56th Street, where a 13-story addition was designed in a similar style as the original building. The top of this addition contains a main dome, as well as smaller domes at its four corners.

=== Venues ===
==== Main Hall (Stern Auditorium/Perelman Stage) ====
The Stern Auditorium is six stories high with 2,790 seats on five levels. Originally known as the main auditorium, it was renamed after violinist Isaac Stern in 1997 to recognize his efforts to save the hall from demolition in the 1960s. The main auditorium was originally planned to fit 3,300 guests, including two tiers of boxes, two balconies, and a parquet seating 1,200. The main hall accommodated the performances of the New York Philharmonic from 1892 to 1962, when the Philharmonic moved to Lincoln Center.

Its entrance is through the Box Office Lobby on 57th Street near Seventh Avenue. When planned in 1889, this entrance was designed with a marble and mosaic vestibule measuring 25 feet (7.6 m) high and 70 feet (21 m) long. The entrance lobby is three stories high and had an organ loft at the top, which was converted into a lounge area by the mid-20th century. The lobby ceiling was designed as a barrel vault, containing soffits with heavy coffers and cross-arches, and was painted white with gold decorations. At either end of the barrel vault were lunettes. The walls were painted salmon and had pairs of gray-marble pilasters supporting an entablature. The cross-arches had decorated cream-colored tympana. The lobby was originally several feet above street level, but it was lowered to street level in the 1980s. The rebuilt lobby contains geometric decorations evocative by the work of Charles Rennie Mackintosh, as well as Corinthian-style capitals with lighting fixtures. The design also includes ticket windows on the south wall of the lobby. Past that, stairs on either side lead to the auditorium's parquet level; previously, stairs continued straight from the lobby to the parquet level.

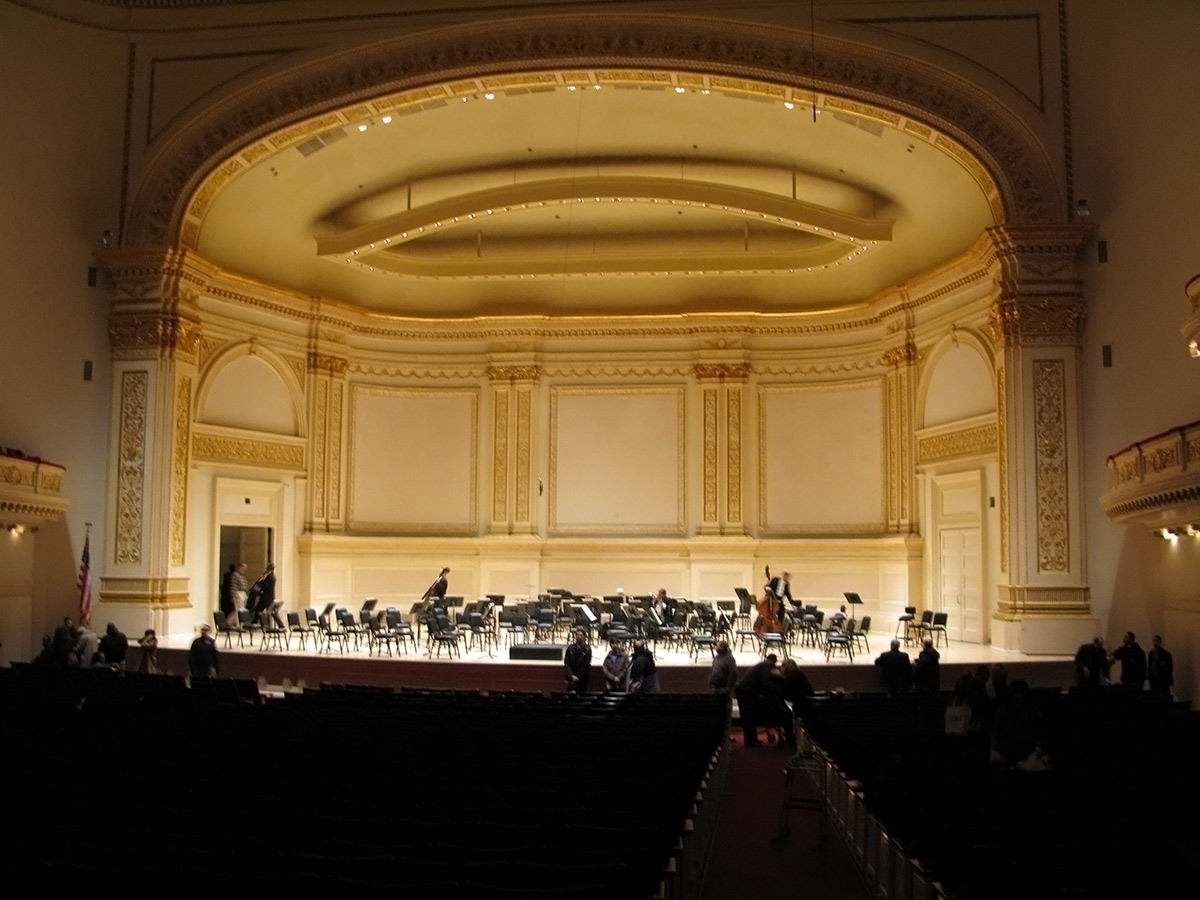
Isaac Stern Auditorium

All but the top level can be reached by elevator; the top balcony is 137 steps above parquet level. The lowest level is the parquet level, which has twenty-five full rows of thirty-eight seats and four partial rows at stage level, for a total of 1,021 seats. The parquet was designed with eleven exits to a corridor that entirely surrounded it; the corridor, in turn, led to the main entrance vestibule on 57th Street. The first and second tiers consist of sixty-five boxes; the first tier has 264 seats, eight per box, and the second tier has 238 seats, six to eight per box. As designed, the first tier of boxes was entirely open, while the second tier was partially enclosed, with open boxes on either end. The third tier above the parquet is the Dress Circle, seating 444 in six rows; the first two rows form an almost-complete semicircle. The fourth and the highest tier, the balcony, seats 837. Although seats with obstructed views exist throughout the auditorium, only the Dress Circle level has structural columns. An elliptic arch rises from the Dress Circle level; along with a corresponding arch at the rear of the auditorium, it supports the ceiling.

The Ronald O. Perelman Stage is 42 feet (13 m) deep. It was originally designed with six tiers that could be raised and lowered hydraulically. The walls around the stage contain pilasters. The ceiling above the stage was designed as an ellipse, and the soffits of the ceiling were originally outfitted with lights. Originally, there were no stage wings; the backstage entrance from 56th Street led directly to a small landing just below the stage, while the dressing room was above the stage. During a 1980s renovation, a stage wing, orchestra room, and dressing rooms were added and the access to the stage was reconfigured.

==== Zankel Hall ====
Zankel Hall, located below ground on the Seventh Avenue side of the building, is named after Judy and Arthur Zankel, who funded a renovation of the venue. Originally called simply Recital Hall, this was the first auditorium to open to the public in April 1891. It had a balcony, elevated side galleries, a beamed ceiling, and removable seats. The space was an oratorio hall capable of accommodating over 1,000 people, and it could double as a banquet hall. There was a full kitchen service, as well as a dais on either side. The space was originally designed with dimensions of 90 by 96 feet (27 by 29 m). Following renovations made in 1896, it was renamed Carnegie Lyceum. It was leased to the American Academy of Dramatic Arts in 1896, then converted into the Carnegie Hall Cinema in May 1961. The venue became a performance space in 1997.

The completely reconstructed Zankel Hall opened in September 2003. It is accessed from Seventh Avenue, where there is a marquee. Two escalators lead down to the balcony and orchestra levels. The venue can be configured with the stage at either one end of the hall or in the center. This is accomplished through the division of the floor into nine sections, each 45 feet (14 m) wide with a separate lift underneath. There are 599 seats in Zankel Hall, spread across two levels. The parterre level seats a total of 463 and the mezzanine level seats 136. Each level has several boxes perpendicular to the stage; there are 54 seats in six boxes on the parterre level and 48 seats in four boxes on the mezzanine level. The boxes on the parterre level are raised above the level of the stage. Zankel Hall is wheelchair-accessible. Its stage is 44 feet (13 m) wide and 25 feet (7.6 m) deep.

Due to the limited space available on the land lot, the construction of Zankel Hall required excavating 8,000 cubic feet (230 m^{3}) of additional basement space, at some points only 10 feet (3.0 m) under the Stern Auditorium's parquet level. The excavations descended up to 22 feet (6.7 m) below the original space's floor and came as close as 9 feet (2.7 m) to the adjacent subway tunnel. This also required the removal of twelve cast-iron columns holding up the Main Hall. In its place, a temporary framework of steel pipe columns, supporting I-beam girders and thick Neoprene insulation pads, was installed. JaffeHolden Acoustics installed the soundproofing, which filters out noise from both the street and the subway. An elliptical concrete wall, measuring 12 inches (300 mm) wide, surrounds Zankel Hall and supports the Stern Auditorium. The elliptical enclosure measures 114 feet (35 m) long and 76 feet (23 m) wide. The walls are sloped at a 7-degree angle and contain sycamore paneling. The lighting and sound equipment is mounted from twenty-one trusses.

==== Weill Recital Hall ====
The Joan and Sanford I. Weill Recital Hall is named after Sanford I. Weill, a former chairman of Carnegie Hall's board, as well as his wife Joan. This auditorium, in use since the hall opened in 1891, was originally called Chamber Music Hall and was placed in the "lateral building" east of the main hall. The space later became the Carnegie Chamber Music Hall, and the name was changed to Carnegie Recital Hall in the late 1940s. The venue was renamed after Joan and Sanford I. Weill in 1986, reopening in January 1987.

The recital hall is served by its own lobby, which contains a pale color palette with red geometric metalwork. Prior to a 1980s renovation, it shared a lobby with the main auditorium. The Weill Recital Hall is the smallest of the three performance spaces, with a total of 268 seats. The orchestra level contains 196 seats in fourteen rows, while the balcony level contains 72 seats in five rows. The modern-day recital hall contains off-white walls and blue seats. In the mid-20th century, the recital hall was decorated with red and gold, which was replaced in the 1980s with Palladian arches similar to those in the hall's original design. A proscenium arch made of plywood, as well as a paneled wall behind the stage, were installed after the recital hall's completion but were removed in the 1980s to improve acoustics. The room has three chandeliers, which also amplify the room's acoustics.

=== Other facilities ===
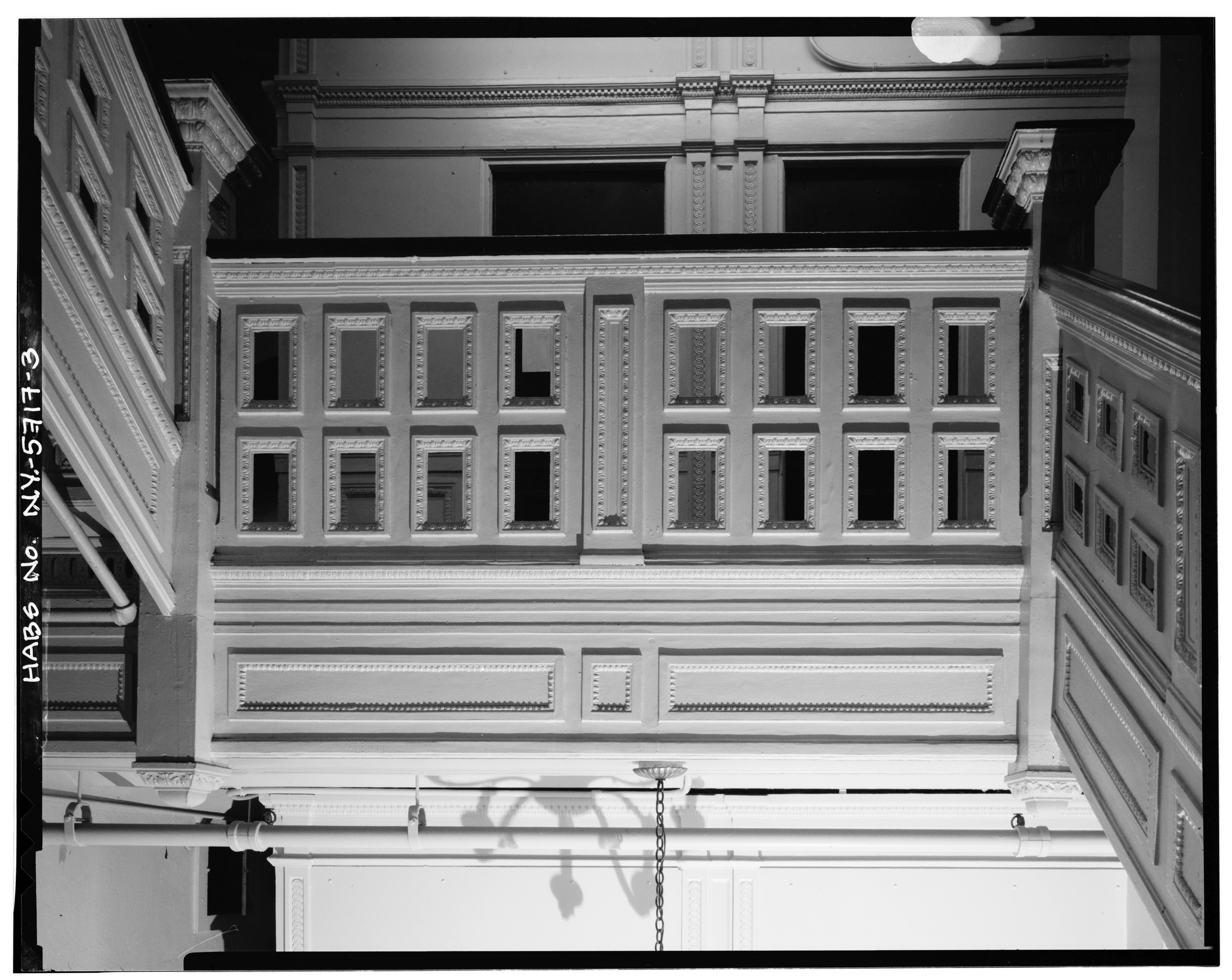
Architectural details in Carnegie Hall, documented in the Historic American Buildings Survey

A boiler room was placed under the sidewalk on Seventh Avenue. A small electric generation plant for 5,300 lamps was also planned. At the ground level of the main hall was a lobby with gray marble pilasters and salmon-colored walls. Stores were added to the lobby in the 1940s. The storefronts, as well as a restaurant at the corner of 57th Street and Seventh Avenue, were removed in a 1980s renovation. Originally, there was a 150-seat dining room on the ground level below the Chamber Music Hall. Above the dining room, but below the venue itself, were parlors, cloak rooms, and restrooms.

Above the Chamber Music Hall was a large chapter-room, a meeting room, a gymnasium, and twelve short-term "lodge rooms" in the roof. The 56th Street side of Carnegie Hall was designed with rooms for the choruses, soloists, and conductors, as well as offices and lodge rooms. On the roof of the 56th Street section were janitors' apartments. Three elevators, two on the 57th Street side and one on the 56th Street side, originally served the building. The addition at the corner of 56th Street and Seventh Avenue was arranged with offices, studios, and private music rooms.

The eighth floor of the main hall, which contained studios, was installed after the complex was completed. There were a total of 133 or 150 studios, many of which doubled as living quarters. Over the years, personalities such as Leonard Bernstein, Isadora Duncan, Martha Graham, and Norman Mailer lived in the studios. The spaces were designed for artistic work, with very high ceilings, skylights and large windows for natural light. Documents showed that Andrew Carnegie had always considered the spaces as a source of income to support the hall and its activities. After 1999, the space was re-purposed for music education and corporate offices. In 2007, the Carnegie Hall Corporation announced plans to evict the 33 remaining studio residents, including celebrity portrait photographer Editta Sherman and fashion photographer Bill Cunningham. The last resident, poet Elizabeth Sargent, moved out during 2010.

The building also contains the Carnegie Hall Archives, established in 1986, and the Rose Museum, which opened in 1991. The Rose Museum is east of the first balcony of the Stern Auditorium and has dark makore and light anigre paneling with brass edges, as well as columns with brass capitals, supporting a coffered ceiling. The Rose Museum space is separated from two adjacent rooms by sliding panels.

== History ==
The idea for what is now Carnegie Hall came from Leopold Damrosch, the conductor of Oratorio Society of New York and the New York Symphony Society. The Oratorio Society had been looking for a permanent performance venue ever since it was founded in 1873. Though Leopold died in 1885, his son Walter Johannes Damrosch pursued his father's vision for a new music hall. While studying music in Germany in 1887, the younger Damrosch was introduced to the businessman Andrew Carnegie, who served on the board of not only the Oratorio Society but also the New York Symphony. Carnegie was originally uninterested in funding a music hall in Manhattan, but he agreed to give $2 million after discussions with Damrosch. According to architectural writer Robert A. M. Stern, the Music Hall was "unique in that it was free of commercial sponsorship and exclusively dedicated to musical performance". At the time, New York City's performance halls were mainly clustered around 14th Street, as well as around Union Square and Herald Square. The area around 57th Street was still mostly residential.

=== Development and opening ===
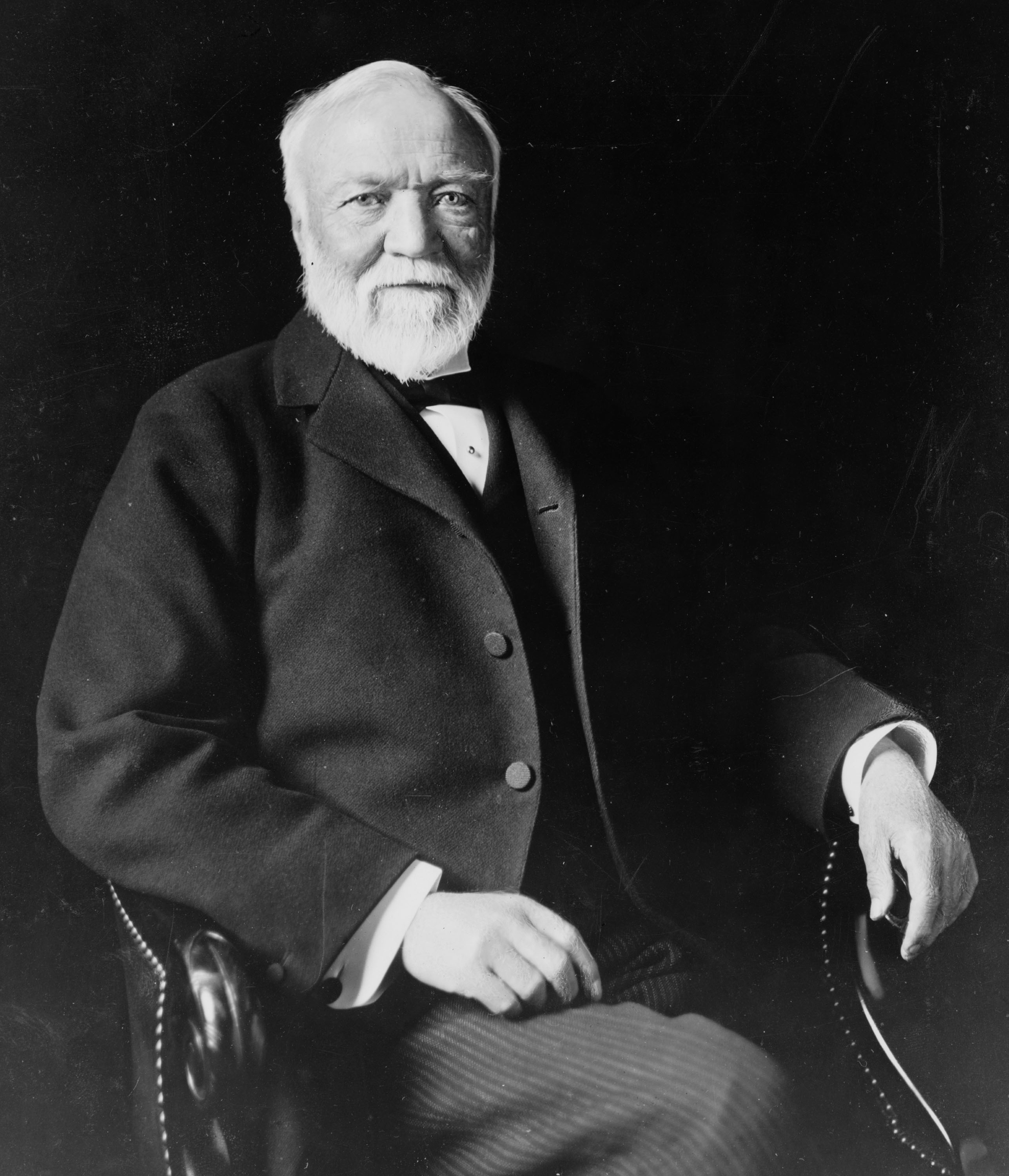
Andrew Carnegie, the venue's namesake

In early March 1889, Morris Reno, director of the Oratorio and New York Symphony societies acquired nine lots on and around the southeast corner of Seventh Avenue and 57th Street. William Tuthill had been hired to design a "great music hall" on the site. The Music Hall, as it was called, would be a five-story brick and limestone building, containing a 3,000-seat main hall with and several smaller rooms for rehearsals, lectures, concerts, and art exhibitions. The New York Times said "The location for the music hall is perhaps rather far uptown, but it is easily accessible from the 'living' part of the city." The Music Hall Company was incorporated on March 27, 1889, with Carnegie, Damrosch, Reno, Tuthill, and Stephen M. Kneval as trustees. Originally, the Music Hall Company intended to limit its capital stock to $300,000, but this was increased before the end of 1889 to $600,000, of which Carnegie held five-sixths. The cost of the building was then projected to be $1.1 million, including the land.

By July 1889, Carnegie's company had acquired additional land, with frontage of 175 feet (53 m) on 57th Street. The architectural drawings were nearly completed and excavations for the music hall had been completed. The Henry Elias Brewery owned the corner of Seventh Avenue and 56th Street and originally would not sell the land, as its proprietor believed the site had a good water source. Plans for the Music Hall were filed in November 1889. Carnegie's wife Louise laid the cornerstone for the Music Hall on May 13, 1890. Andrew Carnegie said at the time that the venue was to not only be "a shrine of the goddess of music" but also a gathering hall. Isaac A. Hopper and Company was the contractor in charge of building the Music Hall. The Real Estate Record and Guide praised the building's design as "harmonious, animated without restlessness, and quiet without dullness." In February 1891, Damrosch announced that he had created a subscription fund for a "permanent orchestra" that would perform mainly in the new Music Hall.

The Recital Hall opened in March 1891 for recitals of the New York Oratorio Society. It was around this time that tickets for the official opening of the Music Hall were being sold. The oratorio hall in the basement opened on April 1, 1891, with a performance by Franz Rummel. The Music Hall officially opened on May 5, 1891, with a rendition of the Old 100th hymn, a speech by Episcopal bishop Henry C. Potter, and a concert conducted by Walter Damrosch and Russian composer Pyotr Ilyich Tchaikovsky. During the performance, Tuthill looked at the crowds on the auditorium's top tiers and reportedly left the hall to consult his drawings. He was uncertain that the supporting columns would withstand the weight of the crowd in attendance, but the dimensions turned out to be sufficient to support the weight of the crowd. Tchaikovsky considered the auditorium "unusually impressive and grand" when "illuminated and filled with an audience". The New York Herald praised the auditorium's acoustical qualities, saying "each note was heard". The Music Hall had cost $1.25 million to construct and was the second major performance hall in New York City, after the Metropolitan Opera House.

=== Late 19th to mid-20th century ===
==== 1890s to 1910s ====
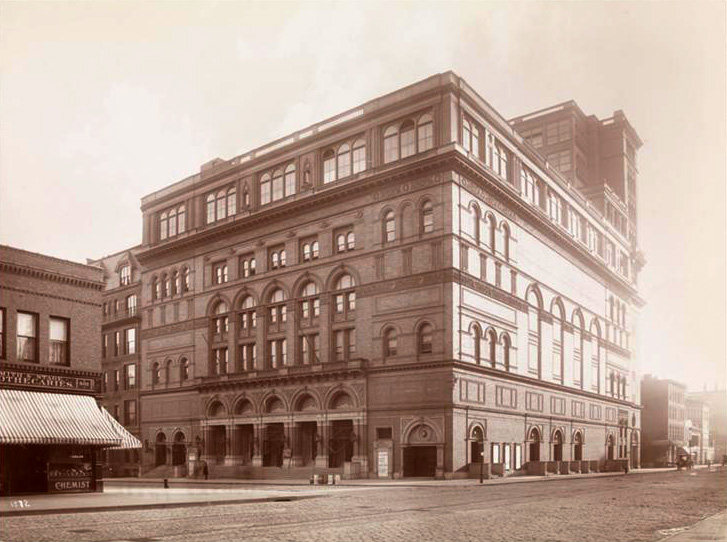
Carnegie Hall in 1895

The Philharmonic did not play at the Music Hall during the venue's initial operating season. Nonetheless, almost from the outset, scalpers resold tickets to the hall's shows at greatly inflated prices, and ushers began selling off tickets to unoccupied seats at the start of each concert. For an inflated fee, the ushers allowed latecomers to sit down during the middle of a show, to the consternation of existing ticket holders. In May 1892, the stockholders of the Music Hall Company of New York discussed expanding the Music Hall into the site of a brewery at Seventh Avenue and 56th Street, which they had purchased about three months previously. The Music Hall Company also discussed enlarging the main auditorium's stage so it could accommodate operas.

By September 1892, the Music Hall's stockholders planned to enlarge the hall to accommodate operatic performances, following a fire that severely damaged the Metropolitan Opera House. At the time, Morris Reno said the stage could not be modified until at least early 1893. The Music Hall Company filed plans for alterations in December 1892. The plans called a tower of about 240 feet (73 m) at the corner of Seventh Avenue and 56th Street. In addition, the original building's mansard roof would become a flat roof, and the seventh story would be converted into a full story. The Philharmonic Society moved into the Music Hall in November 1892, drawing further crowds. The studios atop the building were constructed shortly afterward, from 1894 to 1896.

The American Academy of Dramatic Arts moved into the basement recital hall in 1896, leasing the basement recital hall for the next fifty-four years. Also during the mid-1890s, the Music Hall was renamed Carnegie Hall for its main benefactor. According to Carnegie Hall archivist Gino Francesconi, the renaming occurred "so that it shouldn't be confused by European artists with a vulgar music hall". During the early 20th century, Carnegie Hall accommodated many recitals and concerts because of its acoustic qualities. Until World War I, though, the venue hosted few events related to the predominating "artistic, intellectual and experiential strains" of society, as one writer put it.

==== 1920s to 1940s ====
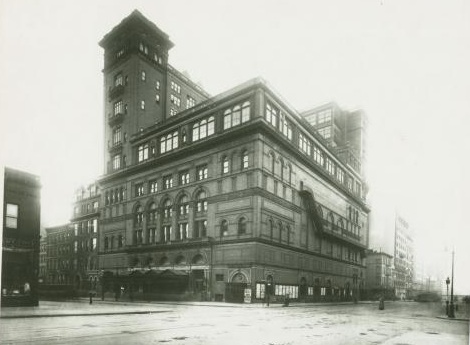
Carnegie Hall in 1910

Carnegie Hall officials renovated the building in 1920, replacing its porte-cochère, overhauling the Philharmonic Society's office, and removing staircases for about $70,000. By late 1924, the Carnegie Foundation was considering selling the hall to a private developer because of increasing financial deficits, which amounted to $15,000 a year. At the time, the site was valued at $2.5 million, and another performance venue in midtown, Aeolian Hall, had been sold for redevelopment. In February 1925, Carnegie's widow sold the hall to a real estate developer, Robert E. Simon. The sale agreement included a clause requiring that either Carnegie Hall would continue to operate as a performance venue for at least the next five years, or another performance venue would be erected on the site. Simon said the hall would continue to operate for as long as it was profitable, and he wished to restore the basement recital hall as well.

Under Simon's ownership, a new organ was installed in Carnegie Hall and dedicated in December 1929. An art gallery was installed at street level in 1932. After Robert Simon died in 1935, Murray Weisman succeeded Simon as president of Carnegie Hall's board of directors, while the late owner's son Robert E. Simon Jr. became the vice president. A bust of the senior Simon was installed in the lobby in 1936.

The main hall was modified around 1946 during filming for the movie Carnegie Hall. A hole was made in the stage's ceiling to allow the installation of ventilation and lights for the film. Canvas panels and curtains were placed over the hole, but the acoustics in the front rows became noticeably different. In 1947, Robert E. Simon Jr. renovated the hall to designs by Kahn and Jacobs.

=== Preservation ===
By the 1950s, changes in the music business prompted Simon to sell the hall. In April 1955, Simon negotiated with the New York Philharmonic, which booked a majority of the hall's concerts each year. The orchestra intended to move to Lincoln Center once it had been built (at the time, plans to build it were still at an early stage). Simon notified the Philharmonic that he would terminate the lease by 1959 if it did not purchase Carnegie Hall. In mid-1955, longtime employee John Totten organized a fundraising drive to prevent the demolition of Carnegie Hall. Meanwhile, the Academy of Dramatic Arts had moved out of the basement recital hall in 1954. The Academy's former space was rented for the time being to other tenants.

Simon sold the entire stock of Carnegie Hall, Inc., the venue's legal owner, to a commercial developer, the Glickman Corporation, in July 1956 for $5 million. With the Philharmonic ready to move to Lincoln Center, the building was slated to be replaced by a 44-story skyscraper designed by Pomerance and Breines. The replacement tower would have had a red facade and would have been constructed on stilts, with art exhibits and other cultural facilities at the base. However, Glickman was unable to come up with the $22 million that the construction budget for the skyscraper called for. This, combined with delays in Lincoln Center's construction, prompted Glickman to decline an option to buy the building itself in July 1958.

Meanwhile, soon after the sale, Simon started planning how to preserve the hall, and approached some of its resident artists-in-residence for help. Violinist Isaac Stern enlisted his friends Jacob M. and Alice Kaplan, as well as J. M. Kaplan Fund administrator Raymond S. Rubinow, for assistance in saving the hall. In 1959, two hundred residents of Carnegie Hall's studios were asked if they wanted to buy the building. Stern, the Kaplans, and Rubinow ultimately decided that the best move would be for the city government to become involved. The move gained support from mayor Robert F. Wagner Jr., who created a taskforce to save Carnegie Hall in early 1960, but Simon and his co-owners still filed eviction notices against some studio tenants. The same year, special legislation was passed allowing the city government to buy the site from Simon for $5 million, and Simon used the money to establish Reston, Virginia.

The city leased the hall to the Carnegie Hall Corporation, a nonprofit organization formed to run the venue. For 15 years, the Carnegie Hall Corporation paid the New York City government $183,600 in cash. Afterward, the corporation started paying the city through benefit concerts and outreach programs. Carnegie Hall was designated a National Historic Landmark in 1962. The landmark status was certified in 1964, and a National Historic Landmark plaque was placed on the building. The New York City Landmarks Preservation Commission also designated Carnegie Hall as a city landmark in September 1967.

=== Deterioration and renovation ===
==== 1960s and 1970s ====
A minor renovation of Carnegie Hall's interior, as well as a steam-cleaning of the facade, took place in mid-1960. The basement recital hall became a movie theater called the Carnegie Playhouse. A screen was installed at the front of the former stage, while the balconies and side galleries were sealed. The Carnegie Hall Cinema opened in May 1961 with a showing of the film White Nights by Luchino Visconti. Carnegie Hall received a concert organ from the Netherlands in 1965, although the stage had to be renovated before the organ could be installed. The installation of the organ was delayed several times, as opponents feared that the changes would damage the hall's acoustics. Meanwhile, Carnegie Hall was profitable by the late 1960s, having consistently hosted about 350 shows a year during that decade.

Carnegie Hall became a more popular destination in the 1960s and 1970s, in part because of complaints over acoustics in the new Philharmonic Hall. The deficiencies with Carnegie Hall's facilities became more prominent after the latter's renovation. Carnegie Hall began to deteriorate due to neglect, and the corporation faced fiscal deficits. By the mid-1970s, the venue suffered from burst pipes and falling sections of the ceiling, and there were large holes in the balconies that patrons could put their feet through. At the same time, operating costs had increased from $3.5 million in 1977 to $10.3 million in 1984, and the deficits had also risen accordingly. Carnegie Hall's equipment included a rundown air-conditioning system that did not work in the summer.

In 1977, the Carnegie Hall Corporation decided to stop allowing new residents for its upper-story studios; existing residents were allowed to continue living there. The studios were instead offered mainly to commercial tenants, who could afford to pay higher rents. This prompted protests from the existing tenants. In 1979, the board of Carnegie Hall Corporation hired James Stewart Polshek and his firm, Polshek Partnership, to create a master plan for Carnegie Hall's renovation and expansion. Polshek found that Carnegie Hall's electrical systems, exits, fire alarms, and other systems were not up to modern building codes. The next year, the Carnegie Hall Corporation and the New York City government signed a memorandum of understanding, which would permit the development of the adjacent site to the east, a parking lot. In 1981, the federal government gave Carnegie Hall $1.8 million for the renovation; the city and Astor Foundation had previously given $450,000.

==== 1980s ====
The first renovations started in February 1982 with the restoration and reconstruction of the recital hall and studio entrance. The lobby was lowered to street level, the box office was relocated behind the main auditorium, and two archways were added to the 57th Street facade. A new lobby and dedicated elevator for the recital hall were also created. The Carnegie Hall Corporation was also looking to develop a vacant lot immediately east of Carnegie Hall. The renovation was complicated by the loss of parts of the original plans. A controversy also emerged when the Carnegie Hall Corporation started evicting longtime tenants of the upper-story studios, particularly those who refused to pay steeply increased rents. The first phase of the renovation was completed in September 1983 for $20 million. A second phase included upgrades to mechanical systems, such as air-conditioning and elevators.

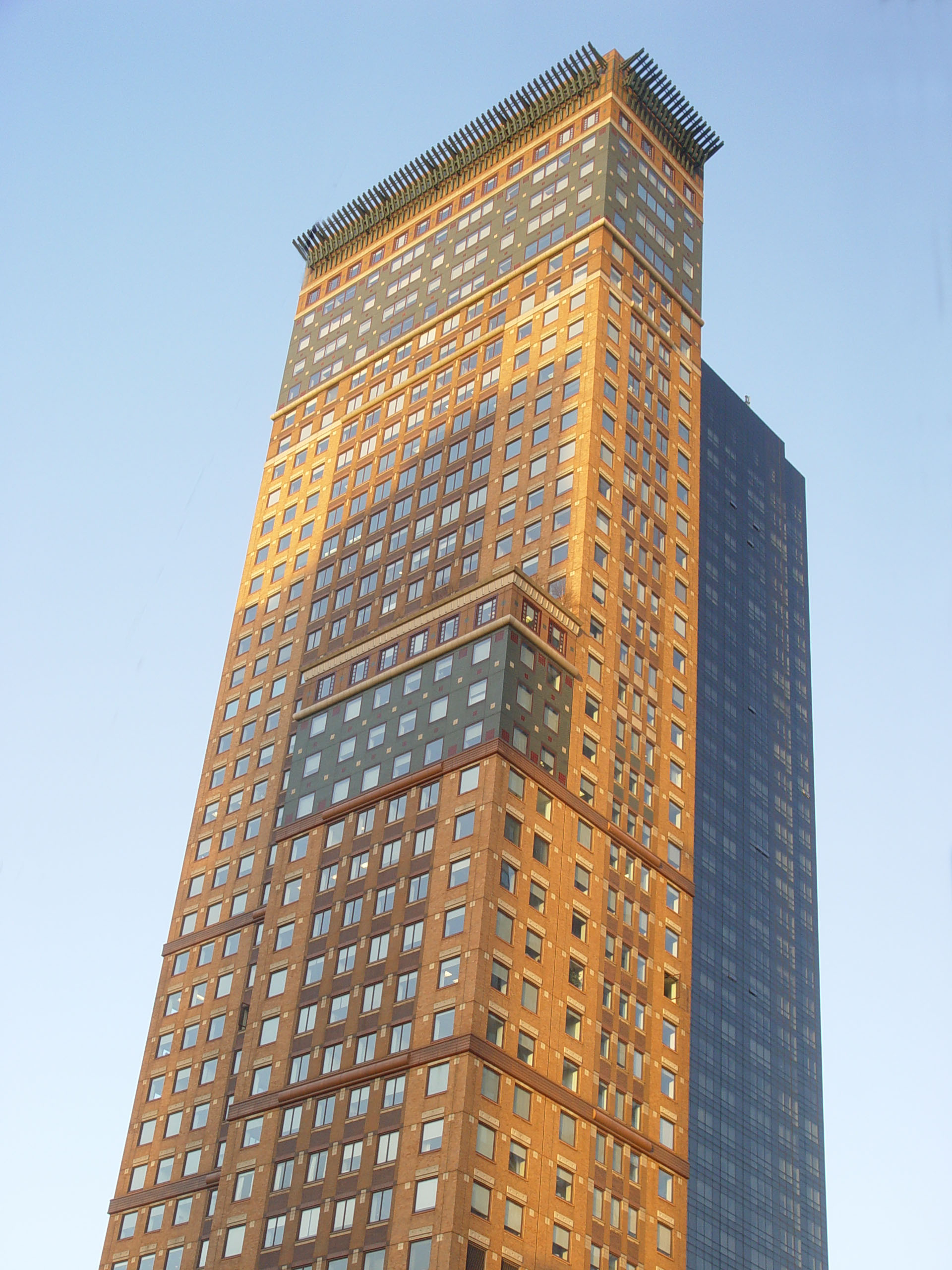
Carnegie Hall Tower next to Carnegie Hall

As part of the third phase of renovations, a recording studio called the Alice and Jacob M. Kaplan Space was built within the old chapter room on the fifth floor, directly above the main hall. The Kaplan Space opened in March 1985. The corporation announced in May 1985 that the main hall and recital hall would be closed for several months. The corporation also started a fundraising drive to raise the $50 million needed to fund the renovation; more than half of the funding had already been raised at the time. A new structure designed by César Pelli, later to become the Carnegie Hall Tower, was planned for the lot immediately east of Carnegie Hall. Further upgrades, which required the main and recital halls' closure, included upgrades to both halls, the lobby, the facade, backstage areas, and offices. The lobby was lowered to street level and doubled in size.

The Landmarks Preservation Commission approved the proposed renovation in July 1985. Renovation work began afterward. The project was complicated by the need to schedule construction around performances, the lack of a freight elevator, and the requirement that materials be replaced with close or exact replacements. In April 1986, Carnegie officials announced their intent to sublease the vacant lot to Rockrose Development for the construction of Carnegie Hall Tower. The following month, the hall closed completely for a seven-month renovation. The hall's plaster decorations were restored, although the carpeting and seats were replaced. That November, Carnegie Hall announced it would rename the recital hall after Joan and Sanford I. Weill, who not only were major donors to the renovation but also enlisted other donors to fund the project. The Weill family had donated $2.5 million, more than any other donor in the hall's history.

The main hall (including the Stern Auditorium) was reopened on December 15, 1986, with a gala featuring Zubin Mehta, Frank Sinatra, Vladimir Horowitz, and the New York Philharmonic. The Kaplan Rehearsal Space was also created in 1986, and the Weill Recital Hall opened in January 1987. A month after the main hall reopened, New York Times music critic Bernard Holland criticized its acoustics, saying: "The acoustics of this magnificent space are not the same." The Weill Recital Hall also received complaints about its acoustics, prompting Carnegie Hall officials to test out noise-absorbing panels in that space. Several noise-absorbing panels were installed in the main hall in 1988, but complaints continued for several years. Critics alleged there was concrete underneath the stage, but Carnegie Hall officials denied the allegations. Isaac Stern offered to disassemble the stage on the condition that the critics pay for the repairs if no concrete was found. Polshek Partners won the American Institute of Architects' Honor Award in 1988 for its renovation of the hall.

==== 1990s and early 2000s ====
During the late 1980s, Carnegie Hall had begun collecting items for the opening of a museum in the under-construction Carnegie Hall Tower. The Rose Museum was founded in April 1991, with its own entrance at 154 West 57th Street. The East Room and Club Room (later renamed Rohatyn Room and Shorin Club Room, respectively) were created the same year. Though the East and Club rooms were in Carnegie Hall Tower, they were connected to the original Carnegie Hall. This represented the first new space added to Carnegie Hall since the studios were added in the late 1890s. At the parquet level, Cafe Carnegie was also renovated.

The stage of the main hall had begun to warp by the early 1990s, and officials disassembled the stage in 1995, where they did in fact discover a slab of concrete. John L. Tishman, president of Tishman Realty & Construction, which had renovated the stage in 1986, alleged that the concrete was there before the renovation. The concrete was removed in mid-1995 while Carnegie Hall was closed for the summer; soon afterward, critics described a noticeable change in the acoustics, generally said to be improvement.

In the basement, the Carnegie Hall Cinema operated separately from the rest of Carnegie Hall until 1997, when the hall's management closed the cinema, along with two shops on Seventh Avenue. In late 1998, Carnegie Hall announced that it would turn the basement recital hall into another performance venue, designed by Polshek Associates. The project was to cost $50 million; the high cost was attributed to the fact that the work would require excavations under the basement while concerts and other events were ongoing. In recognition of a $10 million grant from Arthur and Judy Zankel, the new space was renamed after the Zankels in January 1999; the auditorium proper was named after Judith Arron, who donated $5 million. Construction took place without disrupting performances or the nearby subway tunnel. Zankel Hall had been planned to open in early 2003, but the opening date was postponed due to the city's economic difficulties after the September 11 attacks in 2001. The excavations also raised the budget to $69 million.

=== 2000s to present ===
In June 2003, tentative plans were made for the Philharmonic to return to Carnegie Hall beginning in 2006, and for the orchestra to merge its business operations with those of the venue. However, the two groups abandoned these plans later that year. Zankel Hall opened in September 2003. Music critic Anthony Tommasini praised Zankel Hall's flexibility, though he said "the builders did not quite succeed in insulating the auditorium from the sounds of passing trains". Architecturally, the space was described by critic Herbert Muschamp as "a luxury version of a black-box theater, the hall has the feel of a broadcasting studio, which it partly is". Though Zankel Hall's large capacity was highly publicized, it was only reconfigured once in its first two and a half years of operation. The Stern Auditorium's stage was renamed in March 2006 after Ronald Perelman, who had donated $20 million to Carnegie Hall.

At the end of 2005, Carnegie Hall formed a partnership with the neighboring City Center. The agreement would have allowed the venues to host each other's dance, music, and theater programs; however, the partnership was canceled in early 2007. Carnegie Hall Corporation announced later in 2007 that it would evict all the remaining tenants of its upper-story studios so the corporation could convert the space into offices. By 2010, the last tenant had moved out. In 2014, Carnegie Hall opened its Judith and Burton Resnick Education Wing. The new wing houses 24 music rooms, one of which is large enough to hold an orchestra or a chorus. The $230 million project was funded with gifts from Joan and Sanford I. Weill and the Weill Family Fund, Judith and Burton Resnick, Lily Safra and other donors, as well as $52.2 million from the city, $11 million from the state, and $56.5 million from bonds issued through the Trust for Cultural Resources of the City of New York. The American Institute of Architects gave an architectural award to the project in 2017.

Carnegie Hall closed temporarily in March 2020 due to the COVID-19 pandemic in New York City. The hall reopened on October 6, 2021, with a performance by the Philadelphia Orchestra. Carnegie Hall returned to hosting a full schedule of programming during the 2022–2023 season. A new cafe at Carnegie Hall, the Weill Cafe, opened in January 2024. Although Carnegie Hall was recording record-high box-office revenue by the 2023–2024 season, inflation and ongoing renovations had reduced the venue's operating surplus to $2 million, compared with $10 million in 2019.

== Events and performances ==
Over the years, Carnegie Hall has hosted a wide variety of performances. One source called it "by all measures the most prestigious concert hall in the city throughout the twentieth century".

=== Orchestral performances ===
Symphony No. 9, opus 95, "From the New World" by Antonín Dvořák, performed on December 16, 1893, was the first world premiere at Carnegie Hall. By the 1900s, conductors such as Richard Strauss, Ruggero Leoncavallo, Camille Saint-Saëns, Alexander Scriabin, Edward Elgar, and Sergei Rachmaninoff were staging or performing their own music at Carnegie Hall. In its early years, Carnegie Hall hosted the New York Philharmonic and Symphony, as well as the Boston Symphony Orchestra, the Philadelphia Symphonic Orchestra, and other visiting orchestra companies. In particular, the Boston Symphony Orchestra regularly performed at Carnegie Hall after its first concert in 1893, and Leopold Stokowski of the Philadelphia Symphonic Orchestra regularly performed at the hall for six decades.

The hall also hosted recitals by solo performers such as pianists Arthur Rubinstein and Mieczysław Horszowski, who both debuted at Carnegie Hall in 1906 and continued performing there until 1976 and 1989, respectively.

The NBC Symphony Orchestra, conducted by Arturo Toscanini, frequently recorded in the Main Hall for RCA Victor. On November 14, 1943, the 25-year-old Leonard Bernstein had his major conducting debut when he had to substitute for a suddenly ill Bruno Walter in a concert that was broadcast by CBS. In late 1950, the NBC Symphony Orchestra's weekly broadcast concerts were moved there, remaining until the orchestra disbanded following Toscanini's retirement in April 1954.

=== Other concerts and recitals ===
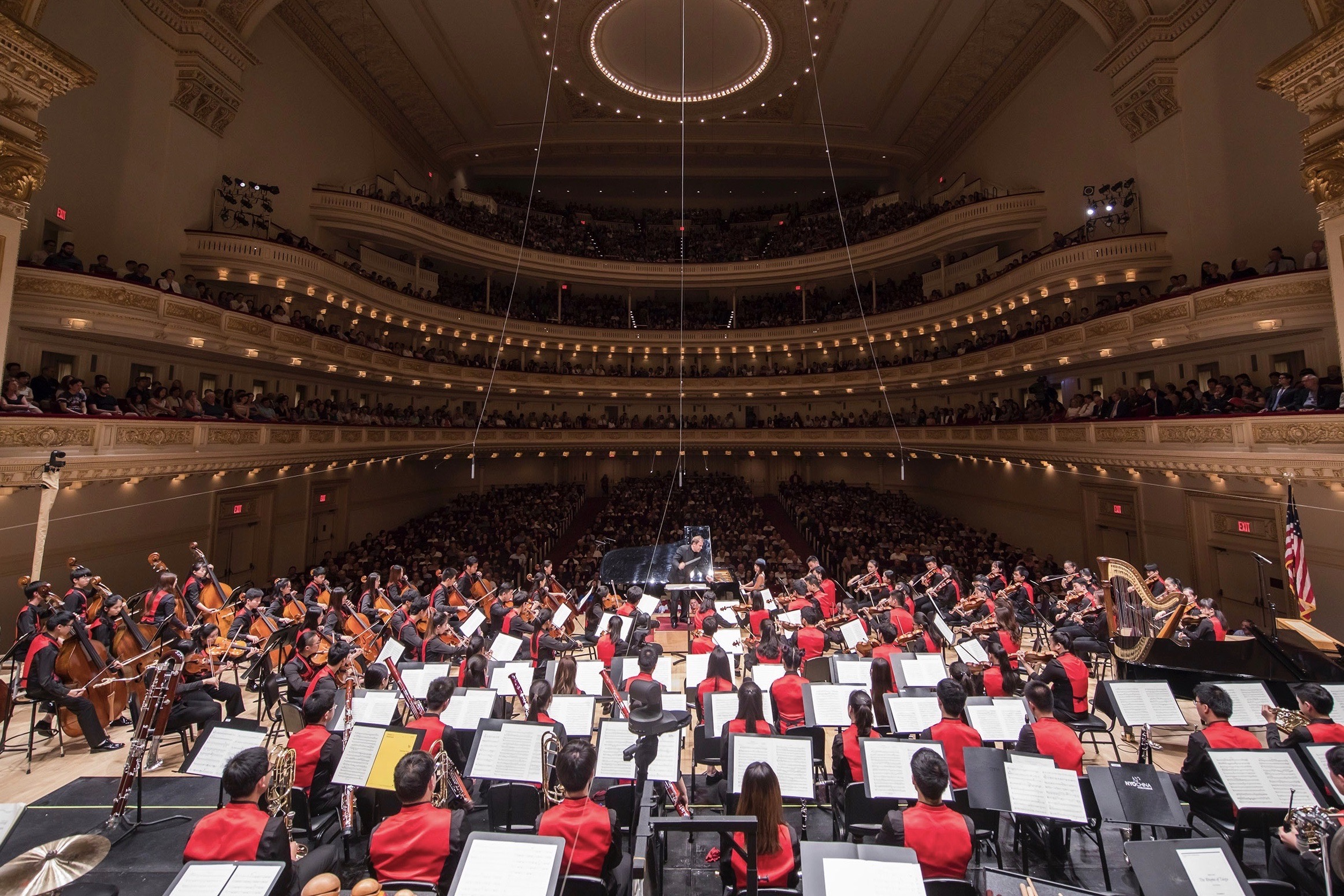
A performance at Carnegie Hall

Carnegie Hall was desegregated from its opening, in contrast to other music venues like the National Theatre, which remained segregated well into the 20th century. Sissieretta Jones became the first African-American to sing at Carnegie Hall on June 15, 1892, less than a year after the hall opened.

The hall was used for popular music as early as 1912, when James Reese Europe's Clef Club Orchestra performed a "proto-jazz" concert there. Many jazz performers have also given performances at Carnegie Hall, including Benny Goodman, Fats Waller, Duke Ellington, Norman Granz, Louis Armstrong, Dizzy Gillespie, Ella Fitzgerald, Charlie Parker, Billie Holiday, Miles Davis, Gil Evans, Nina Simone. Mary Lou Williams, Cecil Taylor, Paquito D'Rivera, Arturo Sandoval, and Chucho Valdés. The Benny Goodman Orchestra gave a sold-out swing and jazz concert on January 16, 1938, with guest performers such as Count Basie and members of Duke Ellington's orchestra. Judy Garland's multi-Grammy-winning live album Judy at Carnegie Hall was recorded at the venue on April 23, 1961.

Rock and roll music first came to Carnegie Hall when Bill Haley & His Comets appeared in a variety benefit concert on May 6, 1955. Rock acts were not regularly booked at the Hall however, until February 12, 1964, when The Beatles performed two shows during their first trip to the United States. Promoter Sid Bernstein convinced Carnegie officials that allowing a Beatles concert at the venue "would further international understanding" between the United States and Great Britain. Two concerts by Led Zeppelin were performed on October 17, 1969. Since then many rock, blues, jazz and country performers have appeared at the hall every season. Some performers and bands had contracts that specified decibel limits for performances, an attempt to discourage rock performances at Carnegie Hall. Jethro Tull performed a benefit concert at Carnegie Hall in November 1970, which was recorded and subsequently issued in several parts. Ike & Tina Turner performed a concert April 1, 1971, which resulted in their album What You Hear Is What You Get – Live at Carnegie Hall. Chicago recorded its four-LP box set Chicago at Carnegie Hall in 1971.

European folk dance music first came to Carnegie Hall when Tanec performed a concert on January 27, 1956, becoming the first dance company from Yugoslavia to perform in America. In 2024, Puerto Rican singer Ivy Queen became the first reggaeton artist to headline a concert at the Carnegie Hall.

=== Other events ===
In its early years, Carnegie Hall hosted other events, including conferences and speeches. For example, Irish nationalists met there in 1899 for a protest, and Winston Churchill gave a speech there in 1900 as a young journalist. The hall has also been the site of lectures, including the Tuskegee Institute Silver Anniversary Lecture by Booker T. Washington, and the last public lecture by Mark Twain, both in 1906. In addition, the venue hosted a peace conference in 1907. Florence Foster Jenkins, a socialite infamous in the mid-20th century for her poor singing ability, gave a sold-out performance at Carnegie Hall on October 25, 1944. The hall was also used for commencement ceremonies, including those of the City College of New York, the New York Law School, and the Juilliard School.

To celebrate the 125th anniversary of the hall, during the 2015–2016 season, Carnegie Hall officials commissioned 125 new works, including "Fifty for the Future" from Kronos (25 by female composers and 25 by male composers). For the United States Semiquincentennial in 2026, Carnegie Hall hosted several American-history and classic American works as part of its United in Sound: America at 250 program.

== Management and operations ==
As of 2021, the Executive and Artistic Director of Carnegie Hall is Sir Clive Gillinson, formerly managing director of the London Symphony Orchestra. Gillinson started serving in that position in 2005. Robert F. Smith has been the chairman of Carnegie Hall's board since 2016.

=== Carnegie Hall Archives ===
It emerged in 1986 that Carnegie Hall had never consistently maintained an archive. Without a central repository, a significant portion of Carnegie Hall's documented history had been dispersed. In preparation for the celebration of Carnegie Hall's centennial in 1991, the management established the Carnegie Hall Archives that year. The collections were renamed the Carnegie Hall Susan W. Rose Archives in 2021, after a longtime trustee and donor to the Archives and Rose Museum.

== Folklore ==
=== Famous joke ===
Rumor is that a pedestrian on Fifty-seventh Street, Manhattan, stopped Jascha Heifetz and inquired, "Could you tell me how to get to Carnegie Hall?" "Yes," said Heifetz. "Practice!"

This joke has become part of the folklore of the hall, but its origins remain a mystery. Although described in 1961 as an "ancient wheeze", its earliest known appearances in print date from 1955. Attributions to Jack Benny are mistaken; it is uncertain if he ever used the joke. Alternatives to violinist Jascha Heifetz as the second party include an unnamed beatnik, bopper, or "absent-minded maestro", as well as pianist Arthur Rubinstein and trumpeter Dizzy Gillespie. Carnegie Hall archivist Gino Francesconi favors a version told by the wife of violinist Mischa Elman, in which her husband makes the quip when approached by tourists while leaving the hall's backstage entrance after an unsatisfactory rehearsal. The joke is often reduced to a riddle with no framing story. According to The Washington Post, the joke "shows how firmly the building [...] has lodged itself in American folklore".

=== Other lore ===
Other stories have been attributed to the folklore of Carnegie Hall. One such story concerns a performance on the unusually hot day of October 27, 1917, when Heifetz made his American debut in Carnegie Hall. After Heifetz had been playing for a while, fellow violinist Mischa Elman mopped his head and asked if it was hot in there. Pianist Leopold Godowsky, in the next seat, replied, "Not for pianists."

While the Elman/Godowsky anecdote was confirmed to be true, other accounts about Carnegie Hall may have been apocryphal in nature. One such story involved violinist Fritz Kreisler and pianist Sergei Rachmaninoff, who were supposedly performing a Beethoven sonata when Kreisler lost track of what he was playing. After a few minutes of improvisation, Kreisler allegedly asked "For God's sake, Sergei, where am I?", to which Rachmaninoff was said to have responded, "In Carnegie Hall."

== See also ==
- Alliance for the Arts, advocacy organization for Carnegie Hall
- Kleinhans Music Hall, another NHL-designated music hall in New York state
- List of museums and cultural institutions in New York City
- List of National Historic Landmarks in New York City
- List of New York City Designated Landmarks in Manhattan from 14th to 59th Streets
- National Register of Historic Places listings in Manhattan from 14th to 59th Streets
