= Garland Anderson (composer) =

American composer and pianist

Garland Anderson (April 10, 1933 Union City, Ohio – 2001) was an American composer and pianist. He studied with Hans Gal and Roy Harris. In 1976 he was awarded a grant by the National Endowment for the Arts's Composer Assistance Program. This grant enabled Anderson to work on his opera Soyazhe which was given its world premiere at the Central City Opera in Denver in 1979. He lived most of his life in Indiana and is chiefly remembered for his jazz and ragtime compositions, in particular his work Streetsyncs: Eleven Ragtime Pieces for Piano. He composed his Piano Concerto No. 2 for concert pianist John Kozar who has performed the work on a number of occasions.
