= Ralph Lyman =

American music professor (1883–1954)

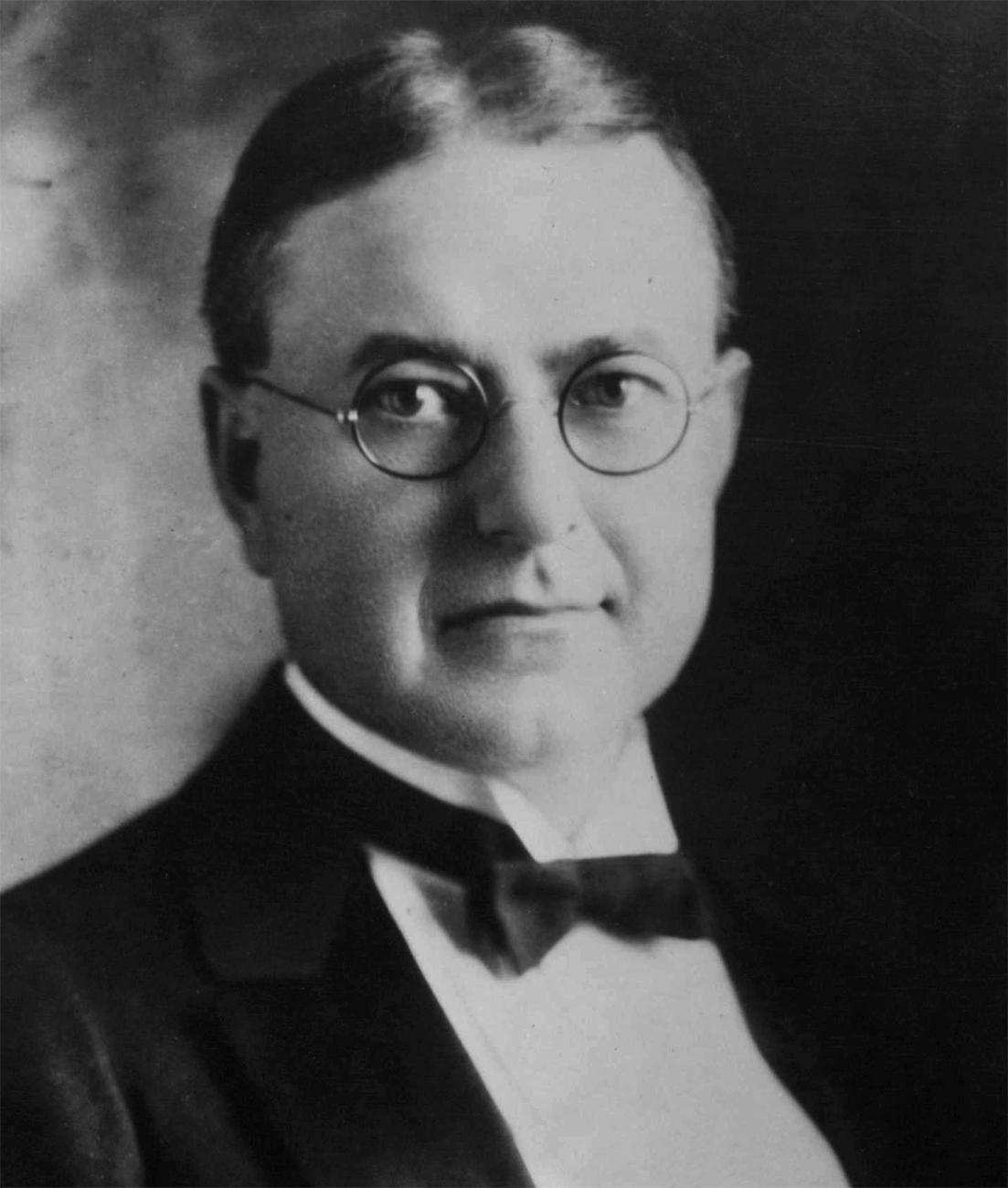
Lyman in the 1920s

Ralph Haine Lyman (1883 – March 15, 1954) was an American music professor. He was the dean of the school of music at the University of Oregon and then head of the department of music at Pomona College in California.

== Early life and education ==
Lyman was born in Madrid, Iowa, and earned a bachelor's degree in music from Grinnell College in 1907. He was the soloist in the glee club for most of his time at Grinnell, and was subsequently known for his work with choruses.

== Career ==
He began his career as director of the music school of Franklin Academy in Nebraska. After two years, he worked for a year as a vocal instructor at Grinnell, then studied voice in Berlin for three years. In 1913, he became professor of music and dean of the music school of the University of Oregon. In 1917 he moved to Pomona College, where he was professor of applied music and head of music until 1948, and was then named emeritus. Under his direction, the Pomona men's glee club won the national title in 1932. In fall 1949, he was a visiting professor at Doane College in Nebraska.

== Personal life and death ==
He and his wife had two sons and a daughter. He died in Claremont, California, following a heart attack.

== Honors ==
Lyman was awarded an honorary doctorate in music by Grinnell College in 1946.
