= J. Christopher Jaffe =

American acoustician

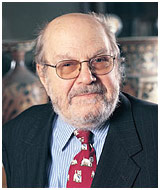
J. Christopher Jaffe (2008). Copyright © 2018 Rensselaer Polytechnic Institute (RPI)

J. Christopher Jaffe (October 4, 1927 – May 23, 2013) was recognized for leadership in architectural-acoustic design.

== Life and work ==
Jaffe served in the U.S Army in 1945 and was stationed in Japan.

Jaffe graduated from the School of Engineering at Rensselaer Polytechnic Institute in 1949 and then went on to graduate studies in theater at Columbia University.

During the course of his work he has consulted on over 250 performance halls, including:

- Severance Hall in Cleveland, Ohio
- Bass Performance Hall in Fort Worth, Texas.
- Concert Hall at the Kennedy Center in Washington, D.C.
- Sala Nezahualcóyotl in Mexico City.

In 1958, Jaffe and Paul Kleinman founded Stagecraft Corporation, which later became JaffeHolden Acoustics. The light-weight demountable shells designed by him were the first engineered to use selective transmission of energy into the stage house and stage-house coupling to enhance on-stage and audience-area acoustics. He likewise was among the first to use electroacoustic enhancement systems and is the inventor of the Electronic Reflected-Energy System (ERES). Jaffe left JaffeHolden Acoustics and in 2009 he joined Acentech Studio A, a specialized performing arts consulting group formed by Acentech Incorporated in Cambridge, MA.

Jaffe has taught acoustics at the Juilliard School, City University of New York, and Rensselaer Polytechnic Institute, where he is founder of the master’s program in architectural acoustics and remained for many years a Visiting Distinguished Professor. In 1993 he received the Ellis Island Medal of Honor for business in 1993. He was inducted into RPI's Alumni Hall of Fame in 2003. In 2011 he received the Wallace Clement Sabine Medal from the Acoustical Society of America. Jaffe died May 23, 2013, in Norwalk, Connecticut.

== Books authored ==
- Jaffe, J. Christopher (August 2010). The Acoustics of Performance Halls: Spaces for Music from Carnegie Hall to the Hollywood Bowl. W.W. Norton. ISBN 978-0-393-73255-9.
