= Nevada Opera =

Former American opera company

The Nevada Opera was an American opera company located in Reno, Nevada. Founded in 1967 by Ted and Deena Puffer, the company staged more than 180 productions during its five decade history.

The opera company behind Nevada Opera is one of the oldest professional performing arts company in the State. The mission of the Nevada Opera arts company is to educate, enrich, entertain and enlighten students and citizens.

The Opera is funded by the National Endowment for the Arts.
