= Mansfield Center Cemetery =

Historic cemetery in Tolland County, Connecticut

- U.S. National Register of Historic Places
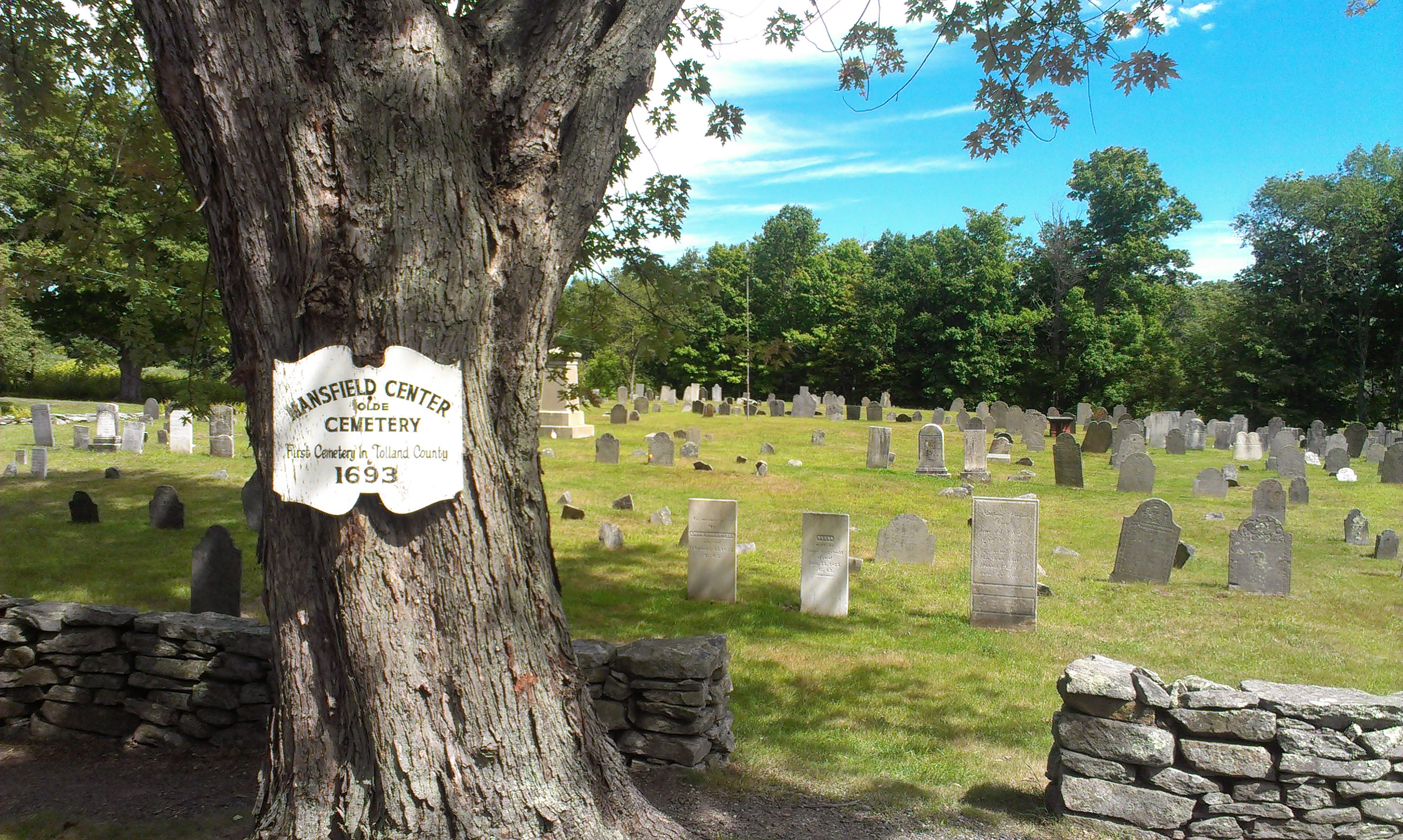
- Mansfield Center Cemetery, Junction of Storrs and Cemetery Roads Mansfield

- Location within Connecticut Location within the United States
- Location: Junction of Storrs and Cemetery Roads, Mansfield, Connecticut
- Coordinates: 41°45′43″N 72°11′46″W
- Area: 1.5 acres (0.61 ha)
- Built: 1693
- NRHP reference No.: 92000905
- Added to NRHP: July 24, 1992

Mansfield Center Cemetery is a small cemetery in the Mansfield Center section of Mansfield, Connecticut. Established in 1693, it is one of the few surviving elements of Mansfield's early colonial settlement history. It also has a distinguished array of funerary markers carved by acknowledged master's across eastern Connecticut. It was listed on the National Register of Historic Places in 1992.

== Description and history ==
Mansfield Center Cemetery is located south of the modern center of Mansfield, at the southeast corner of Storrs and Cemetery Roads. It is a roughly rectangular area 1.5 acres (0.61 ha) in size, ringed by a fieldstone wall. A line of trees separates the cemetery from Storrs Road, and there is a gate with stone posts providing entrance to the ground. The cemetery grounds are densely filled with burial sites, with the burials uniformly oriented with the head to the east, and headstones with the carved face to the west. Many 18th and 19th century markers carved of a variety of materials featuring elaborate designs dot the grounds. The oldest dated marker is for Exercise Conant, who died in 1722.

Mansfield was settled as part of Windham in 1690 and was separately incorporated in 1704. The site was set aside for use as a cemetery as early as 1693 and it remained in general use for that purpose until the 1870s. The cemetery's 18th-century gravestones, decorated with cherubim, geometric designs, and a variety of funerary symbols, are considered to be illustrative of the rich artistic tradition of funerary stone carving in colonial New England. More than 180 stones have been attributed to identifiable stone carvers, including such 18th-century masters of the craft as John Hartshorne, Obadiah Wheeler, Benjamin Collins and his son Zerubbabel, Gershom Bartlett, John Huntington, the Manning Family, Jonathan Loomis, Aaron Haskins, Stephen Spaulding, Elijah Sikes, and John Walden. Two primitive carvings exist by local carver James Hovey. 19th century carvers represented include the Upswept Wing Carver, Caleb Huntington, Thomas Welch, the Warrenville Carver, and Orivlle Griswold.

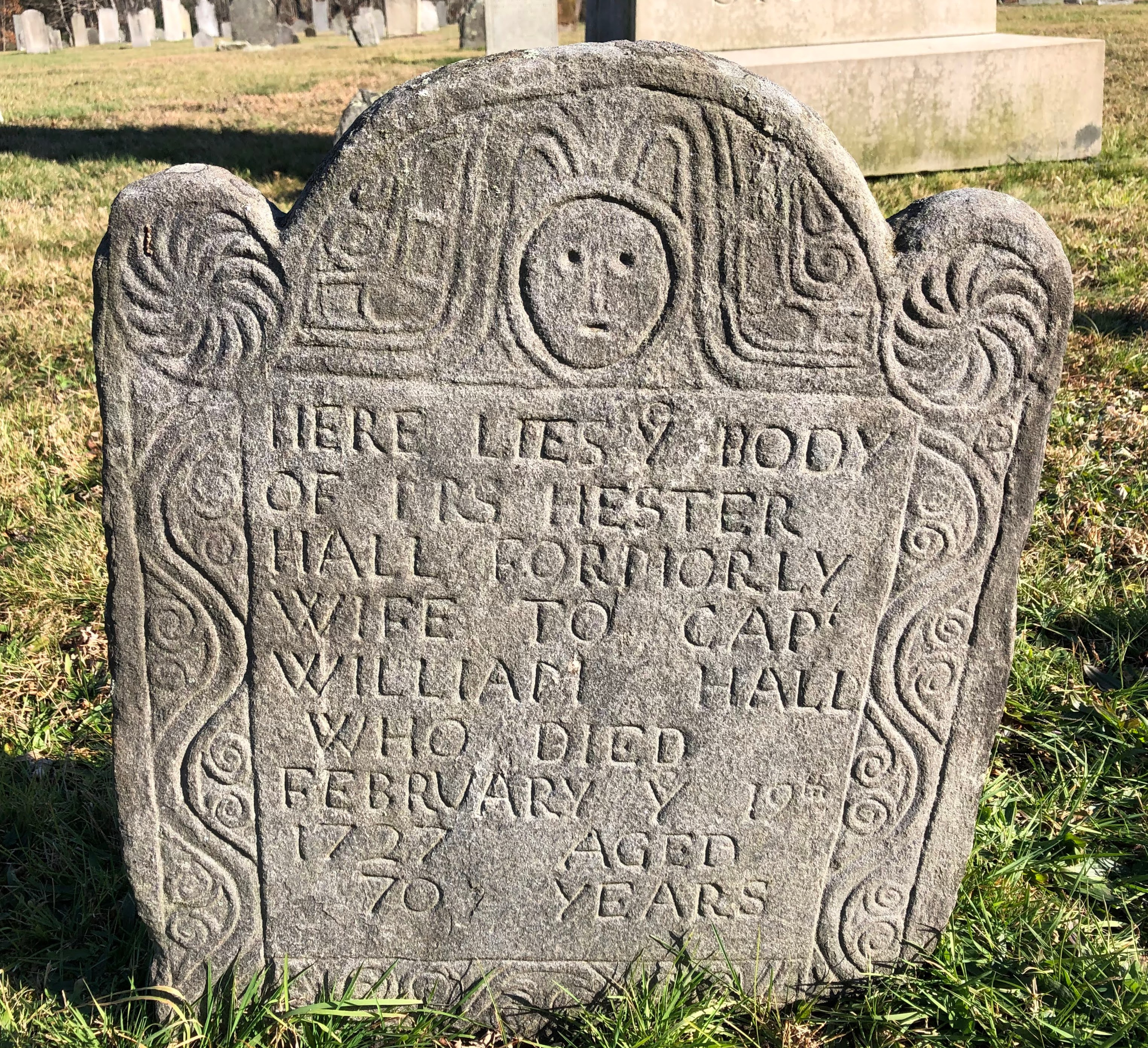
Gravestone carved by John Hartshorne of Franklin CT.

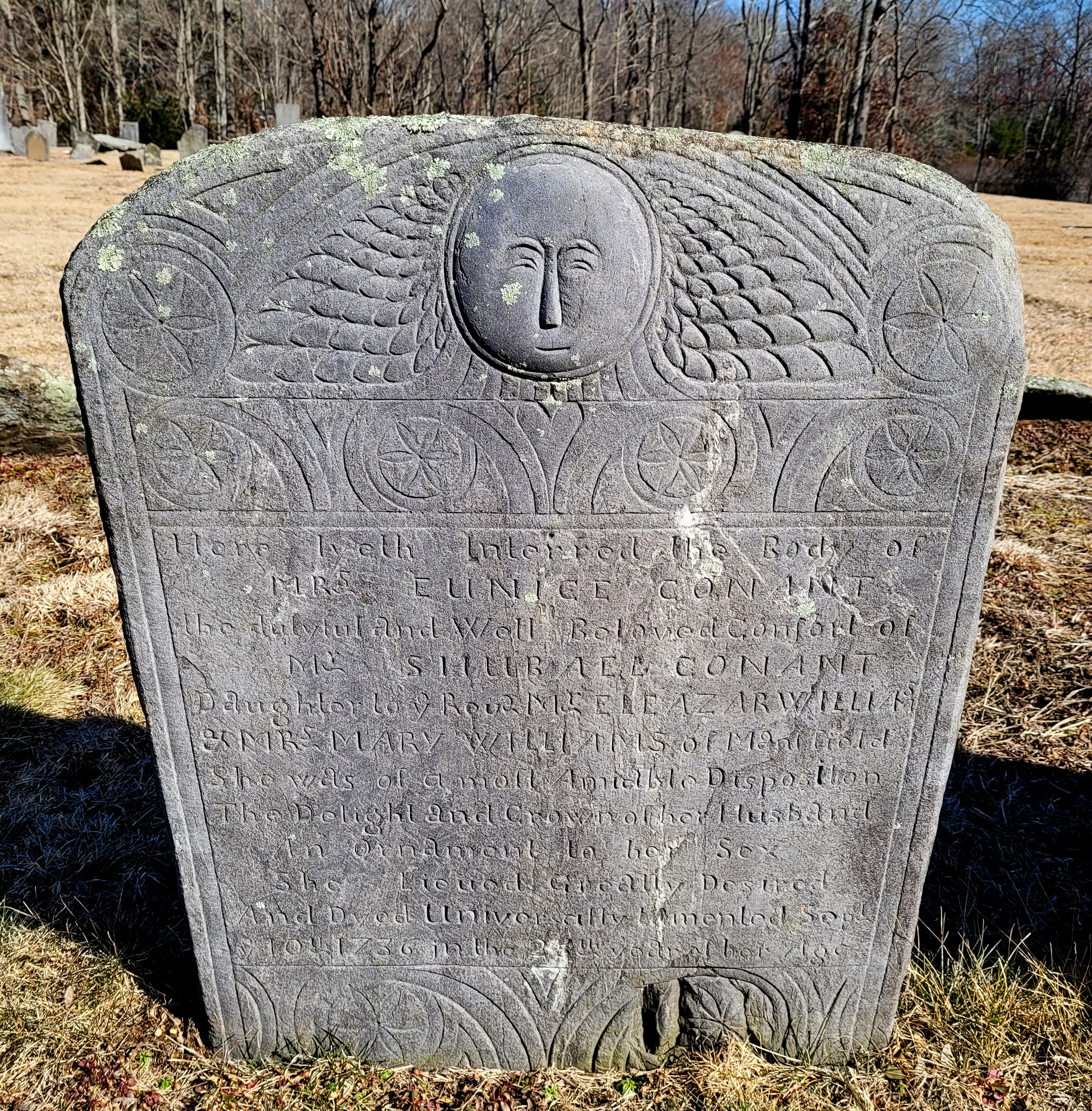
Gravestone carved by Obadiah Wheeler of Lebanon CT.

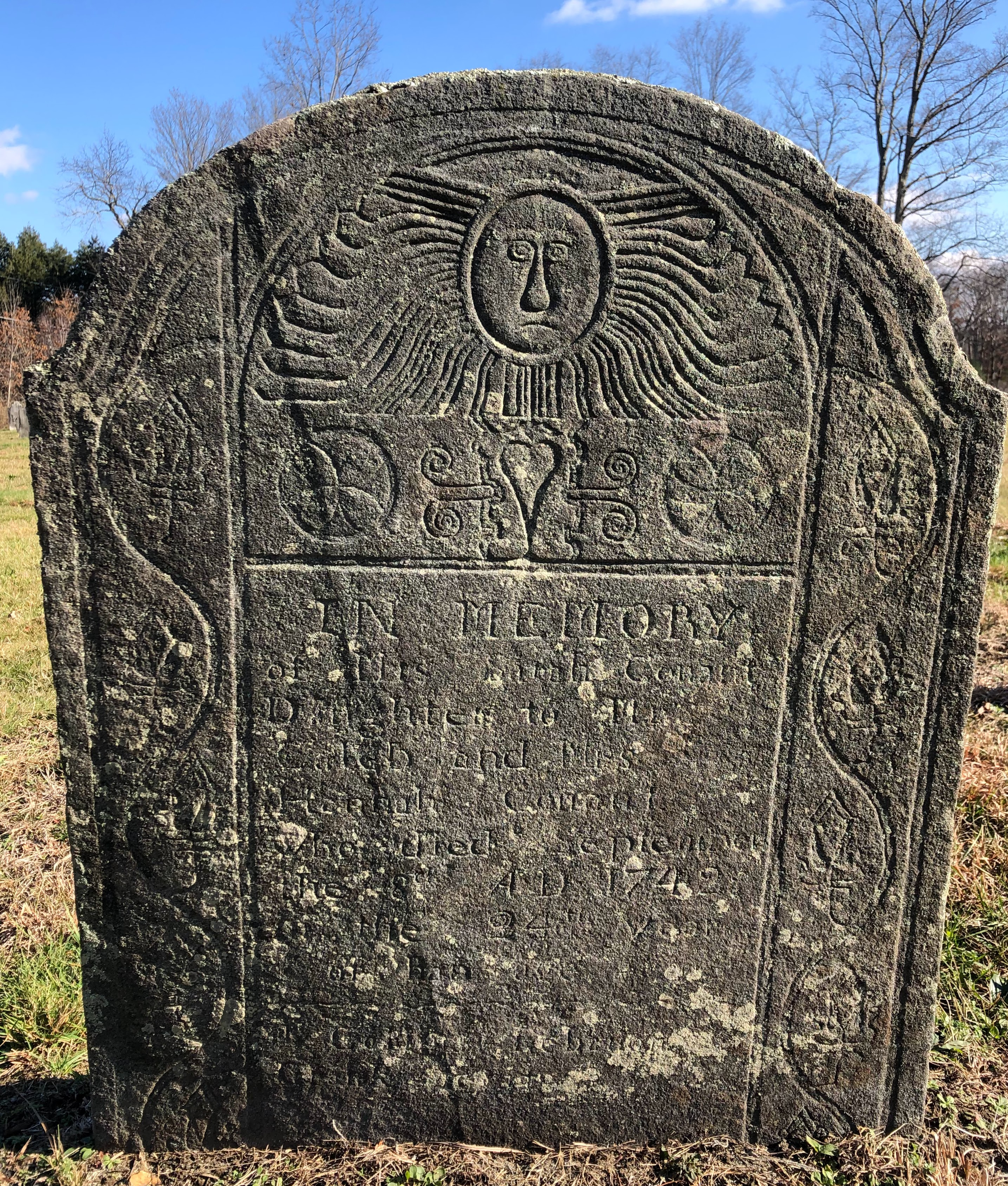
Gravestone carved by Benjamin Collins of Columbia CT.

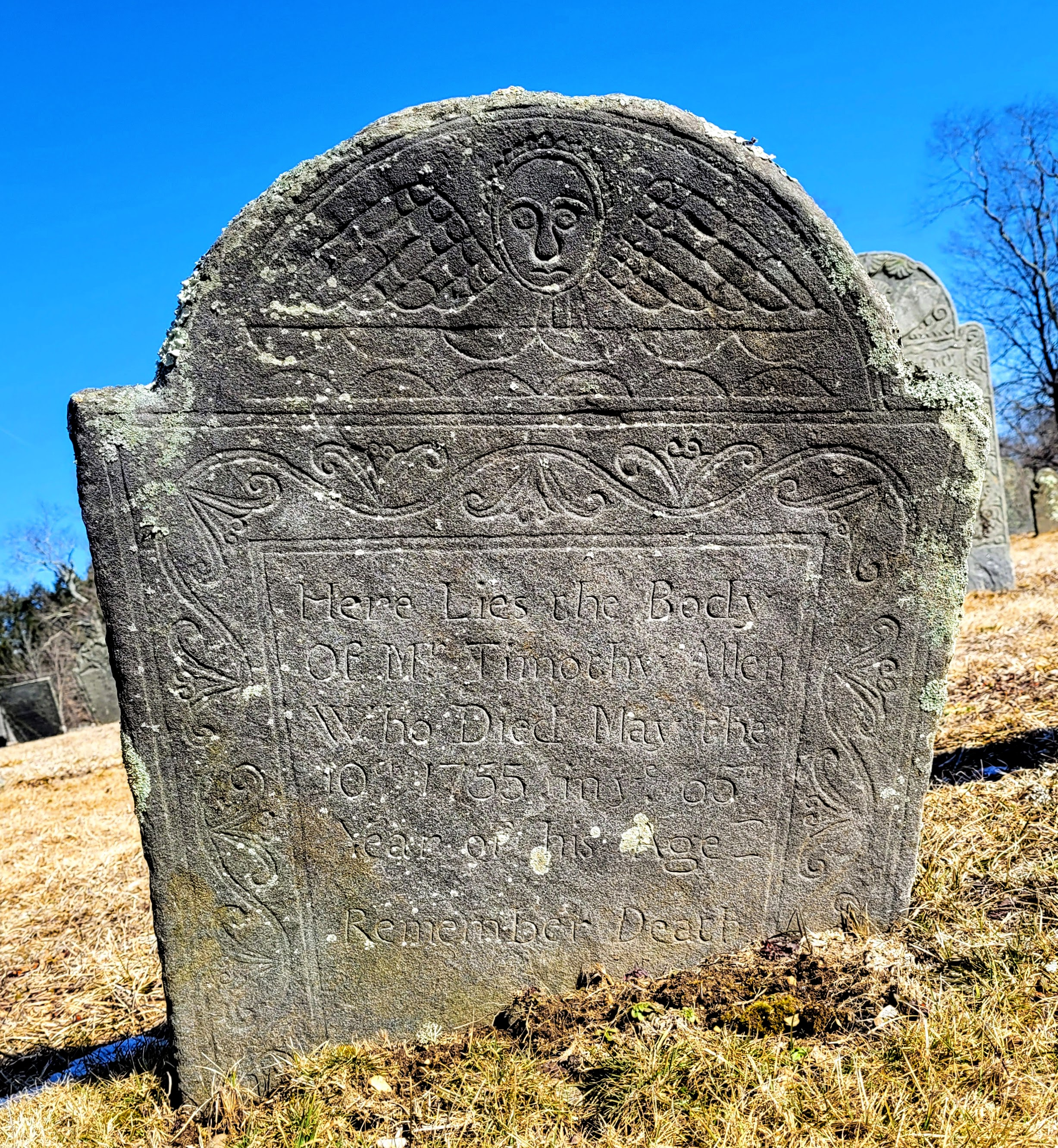
Gravestone carved by John Huntington of Lebanon CT.

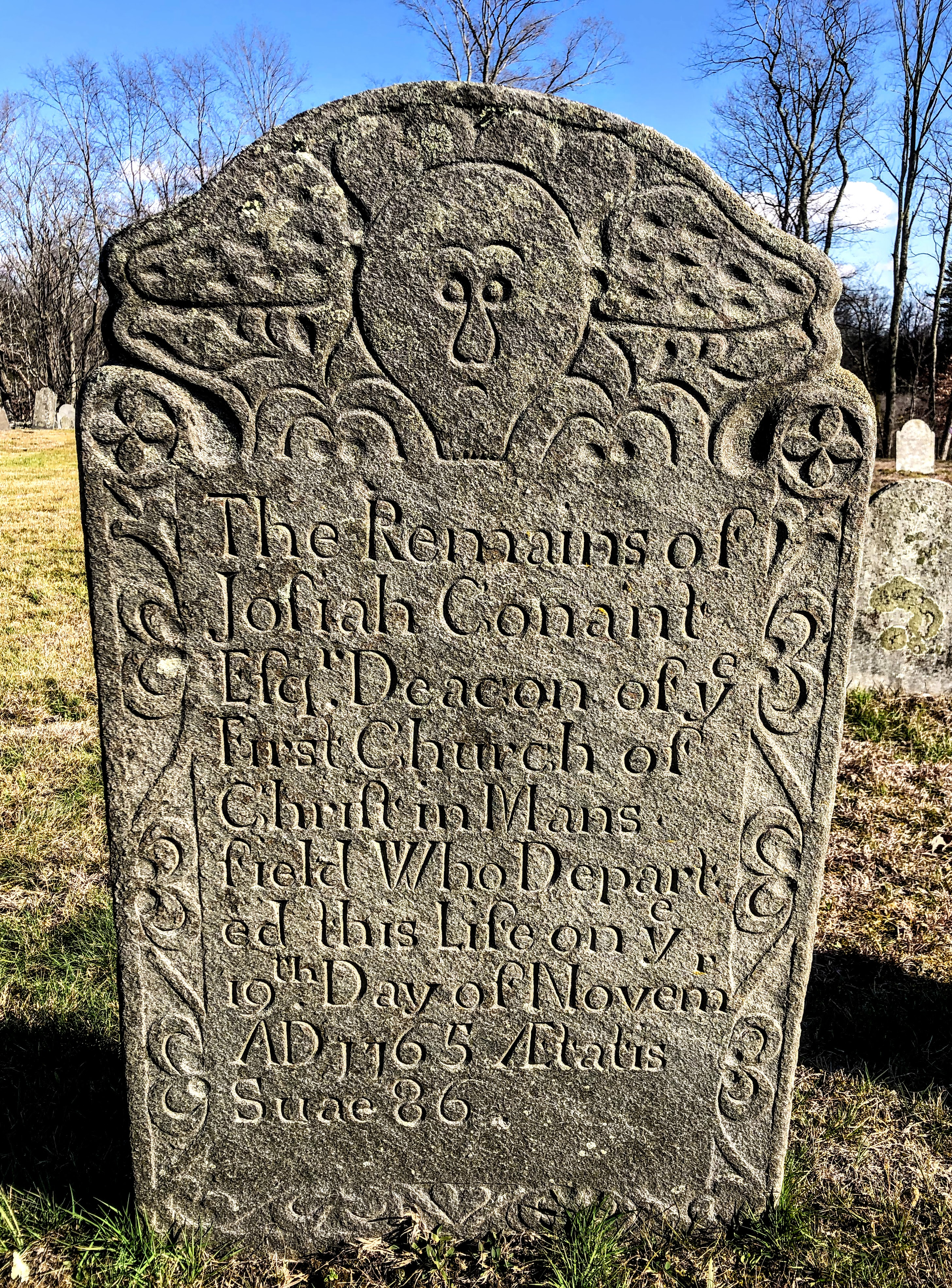
Gravestone carved by Gershom Bartlett of Bolton CT.

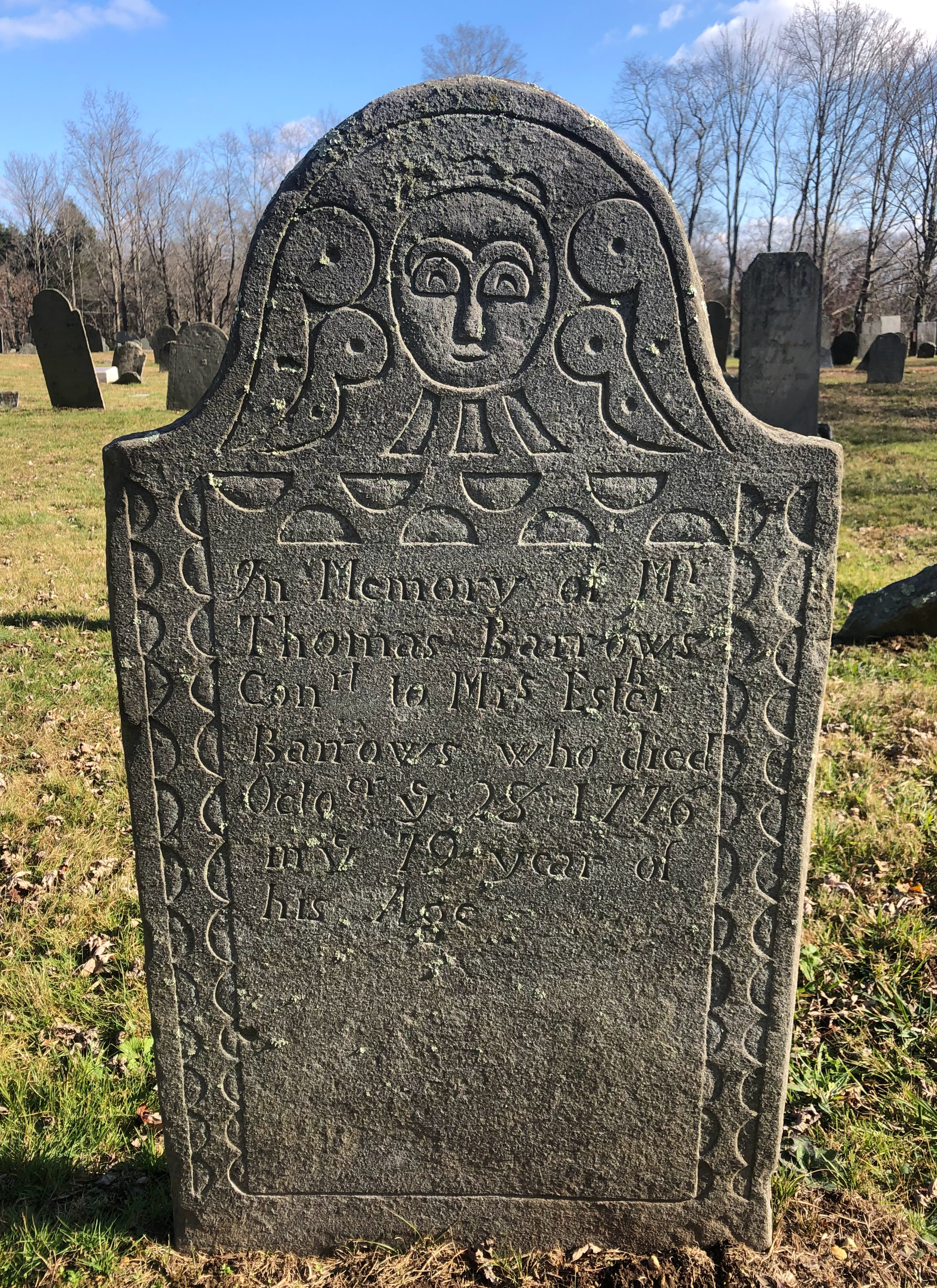
Gravestone carved by Jonathan Loomis of Coventry CT.

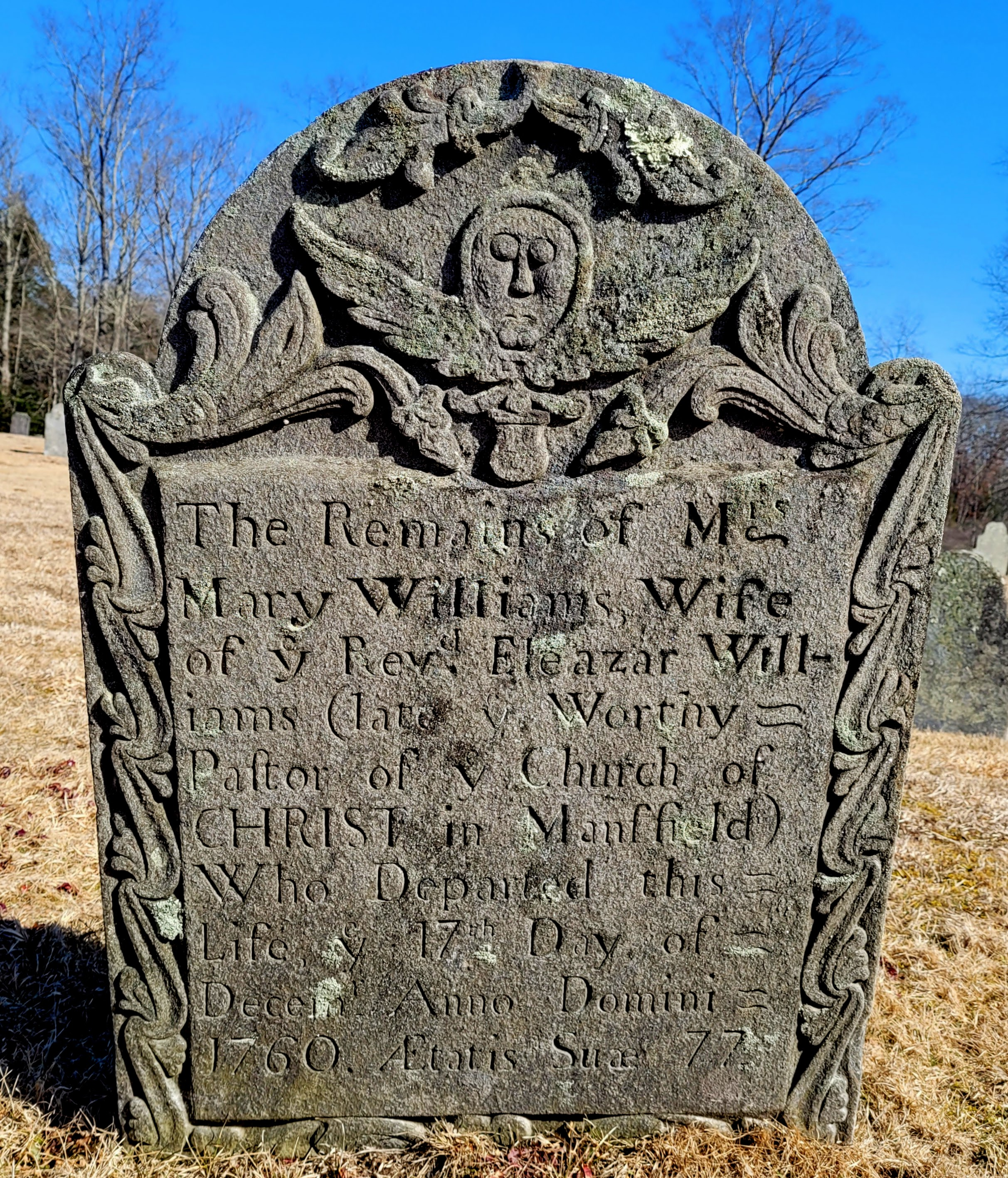
Gravestone carved by Zerubbabel Collins of Columbia CT.

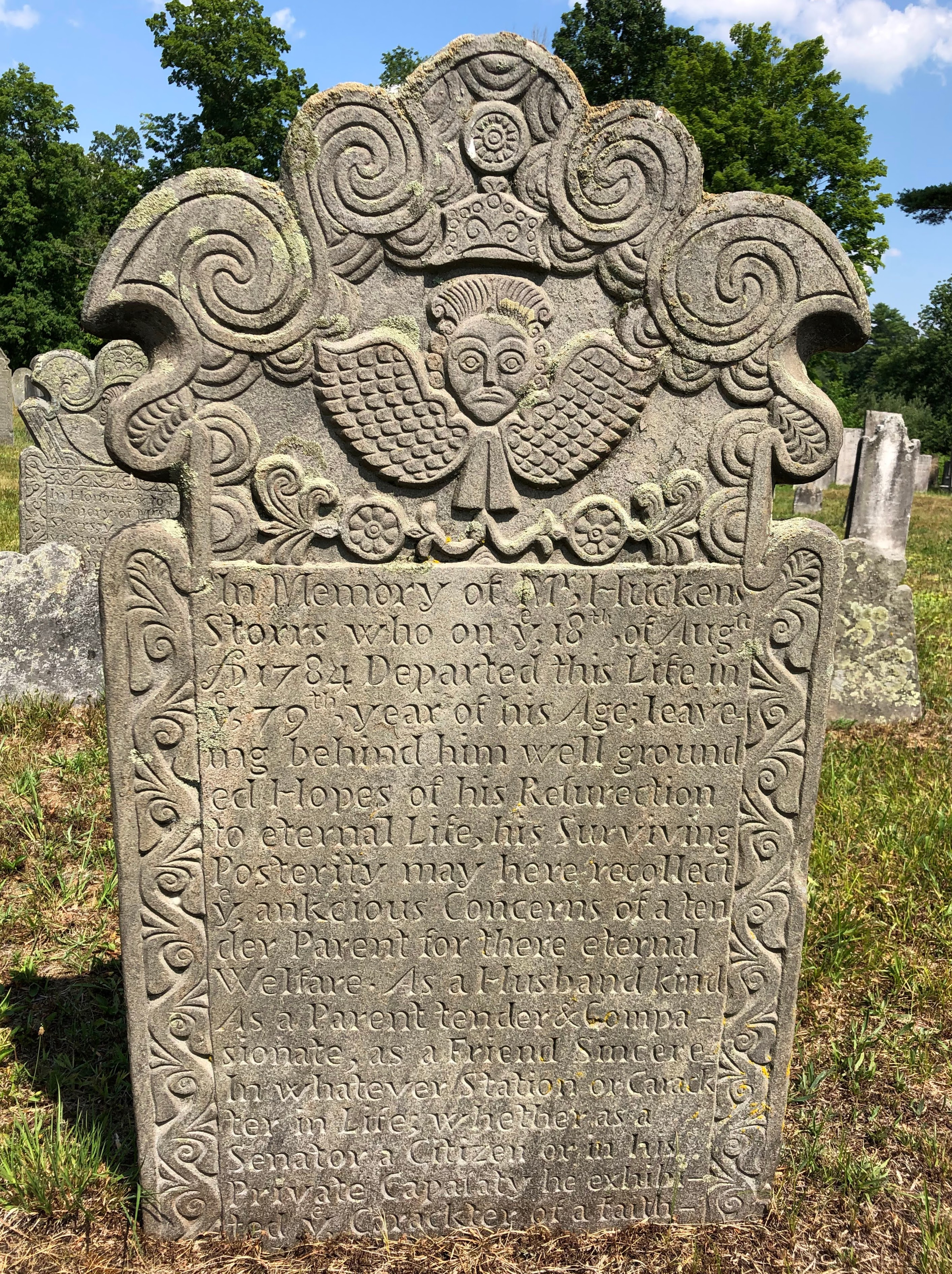
Gravestone carved by Josiah Manning of Franklin CT.

== See also ==
- Mansfield Center Historic District, also NRHP-listed
- National Register of Historic Places listings in Tolland County, Connecticut
