= Nathaniel Holmes =

Nathaniel Holmes may refer to:

- Nathaniel Holmes (judge) (1815—1901)
- Nathaniel Holmes (stonecarver) (1783–1869)
- Nathaniel Holmes (theologian) (1599–1678)

== See also ==
- Nathaniel Holmes Odell (1828–1904)
