= Zerubbabel Collins =

Colonial New England Gravestone carver

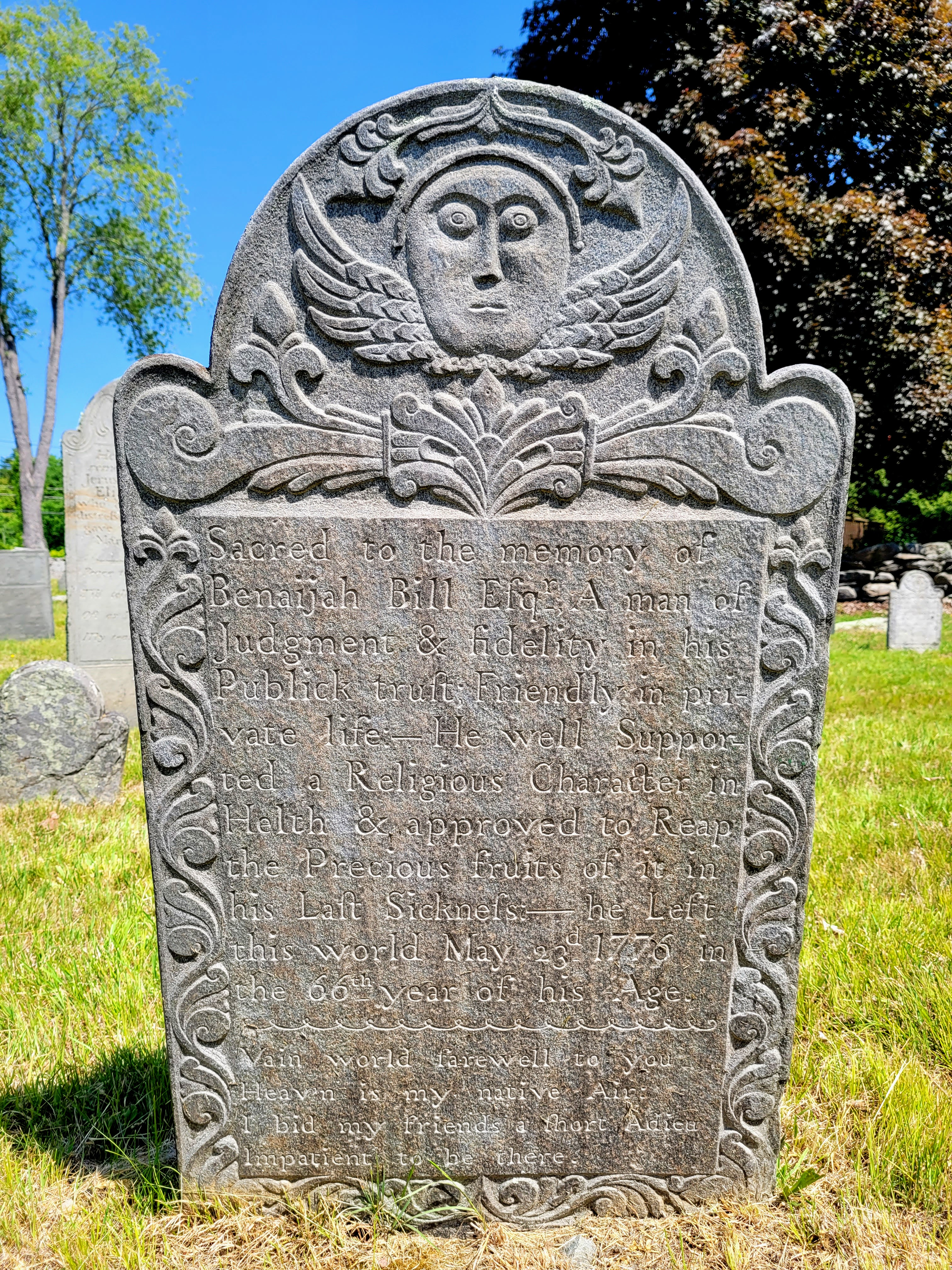
- Schist gravestone carved by Zerubbabel Collins in the Old Yard of Columbia, Connecticut
- Born: July 10, 1733; Columbia, Connecticut, Connecticut River Colony, British America
- Died: December 22, 1797 (aged 64); Shaftsbury, Vermont, United States
- Occupations: Gravestone carver, stonemason.
- Years active: 1755−1797

Zerubbabel Collins (1733–1797) was a carver of stone gravestones in New England in the 18th century. He has been called "one of the most important carvers represented in Vermont in the years after the American Revolution" and "one of the most talented [gravestone carvers] of his time".

== Life and work ==
Collins was the son of Benjamin Collins (1691–1759), a cabinet maker and prolific gravestone craftsman. Collins' older brother Julius Collins (1728–1758) was also a gravestone carver and later a military man. Collins learned and worked under his father during the early 1750s, but by 1755 had begun carving full stones on his own. He carved his father's gravestone when he died in 1759.

Through the 1760's his style rapidly advanced with sculpting ability highlighted with various designs often with deep relief. In 1778 he moved to Vermont as former carving competitor Gershom Bartlett had several years earlier, though he worked in white marble of the Shaftsbury Quarry rather than dark slate. He continued carving stones around Vermont, as well as adjacent towns in New York and beyond until his death in 1797. He carved around 300 gravestones through his career, spread as far away as Nova Scotia.

== Cemeteries with gravestones by Zerubbabel Collins ==
=== Connecticut ===
- Bozrah Rural Cemetery, Bozrah, Connecticut. 3 gravestones carved by Collins
- Parker Cemetery, Bozrah, Connecticut. 2 gravestones carved by Collins
- Columbia, Connecticut. Over 60 gravestones carved by Collins
- Nathan Hale Cemetery, Coventry, Connecticut. 3 gravestones carved by Collins
- Old Hebron Cemetery, Hebron, Connecticut. 3 gravestones carved by Collins
- Trumbull Burial Ground, Lebanon, Connecticut. 3 gravestones carved by Collins
- Old Norwichtown Burial Ground, Norwich, Connecticut. 1 gravestone carved by Collins
- Mansfield Center Cemetery, Mansfield, Connecticut. At least 4 gravestones carved by Collins
- Windham Center Cemetery, Windham, Connecticut. 2 gravestones carved by Collins
- East Woodstock Cemetery, Woodstock, Connecticut. 1 gravestone carved by Collins

=== New York ===
- Salem, New York

=== Vermont ===
- Bennington Centre Cemetery, Bennington, Vermont. Over 40 gravestones carved by Collins
- Shaftsbury, Vermont. Over 30 gravestones carved by Collins
- Factory Point Cemetery

Manchester, Vermont. Rachel Burton 1790

== See also ==
- Funerary art in Puritan New England
- Gershom Bartlett
