= Funerary art in Puritan New England =

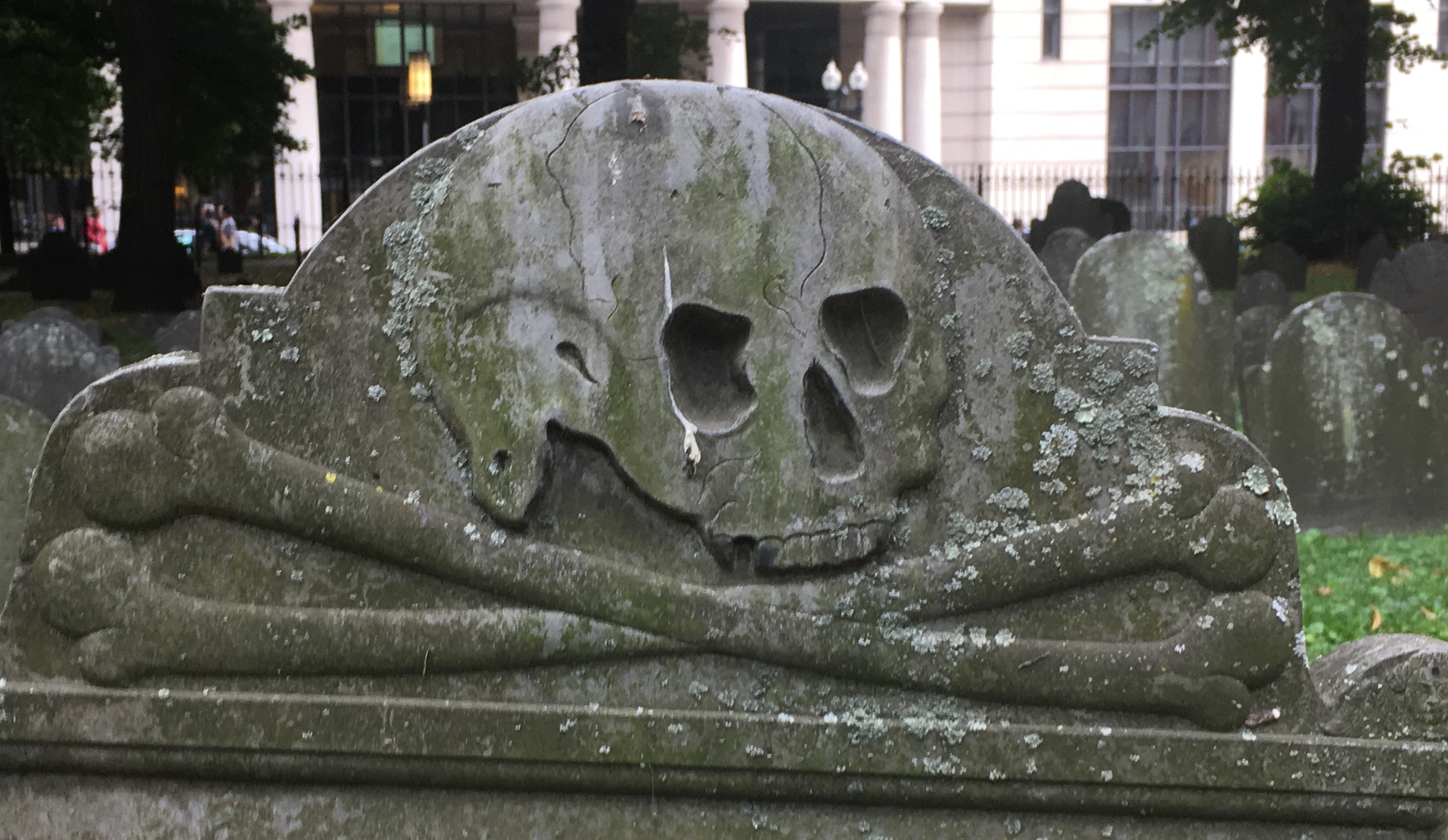
Death's head carved by John Homer, Granary Burying Ground, Boston, Massachusetts

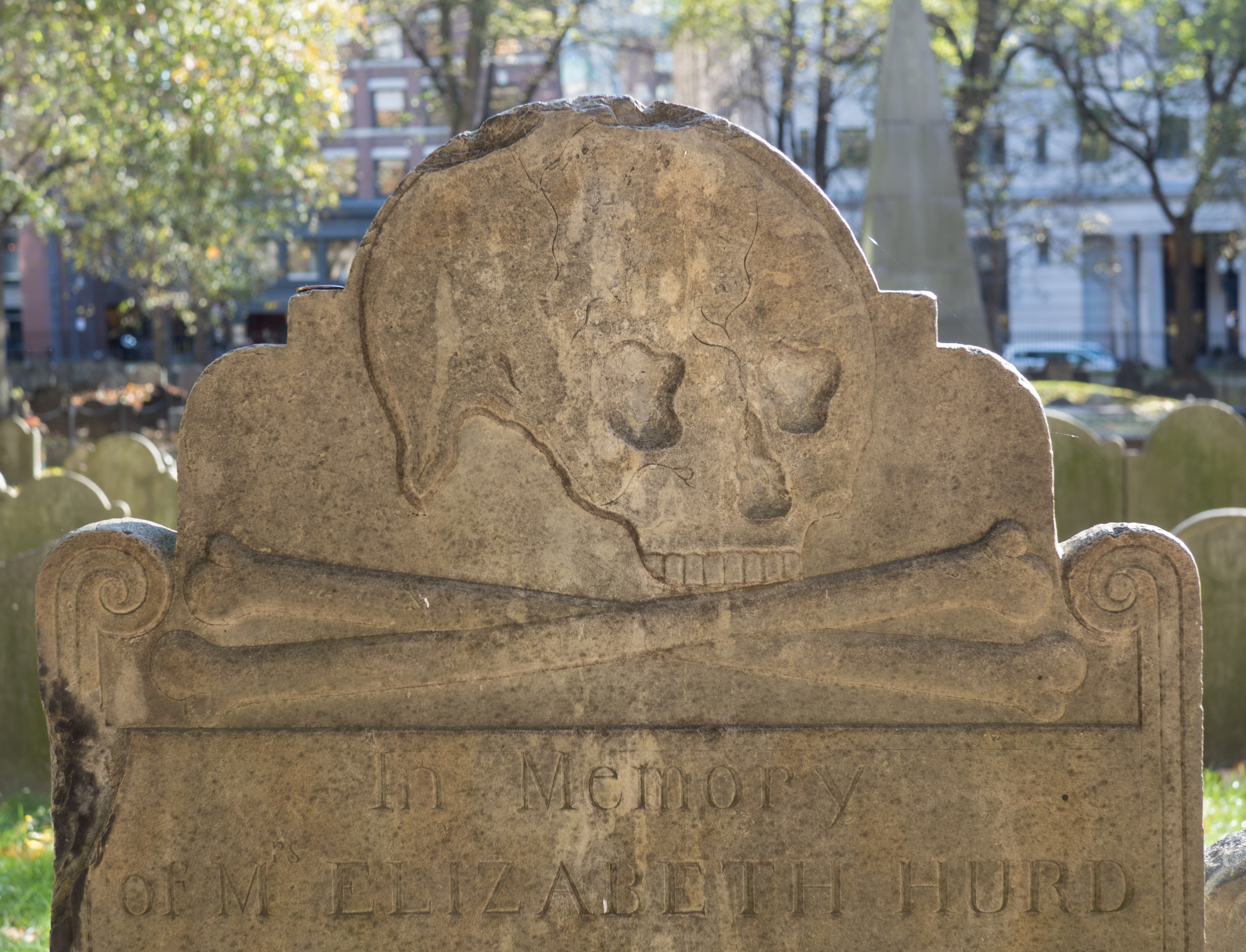
Skull and cross-bones, gravestone of Elizabeth Hurd (d. 1779), carved by John Homer, Granary Burying Ground

Funerary art in Puritan New England encompasses graveyard headstones carved between c. 1640 and the late 18th century by the Puritans, founders of the first American colonies, and their descendants. Early New England Puritan funerary art conveys a practical attitude towards 17th-century mortality; death was an ever-present reality of life, and their funerary traditions and grave art provide a unique insight into their views on death. The minimalist decoration and lack of embellishment of the early headstone designs reflect the British Puritan and Anglo-Saxon religious cultures.

The earliest Puritan graves in the New England states of Maine, Vermont, New Hampshire, Massachusetts, Connecticut and Rhode Island were usually dug without planning, in designated local burial grounds. They were mostly unmarked, but sometimes given upright slate, sandstone or granite stones containing factual, but often blunt and inelegant, inscriptions. Later generations decorated their headstones with carvings, most dramatically in the late 17th century with depictions of death's head, a stylized skull, sometimes with wings or crossed bones.

Other examples show the deceased being carried by the wings, which supposedly took the soul to heaven. From the 1690s, the imagery became less severe and began to include winged cherubs (known as "soul effigies") who had fuller faces and rounder and more life-sized eyes and mouths. In headstones dating from the Federalist Era, the rise of secularism saw the prominence of urn and willow imagery.

== Stonecarvers ==
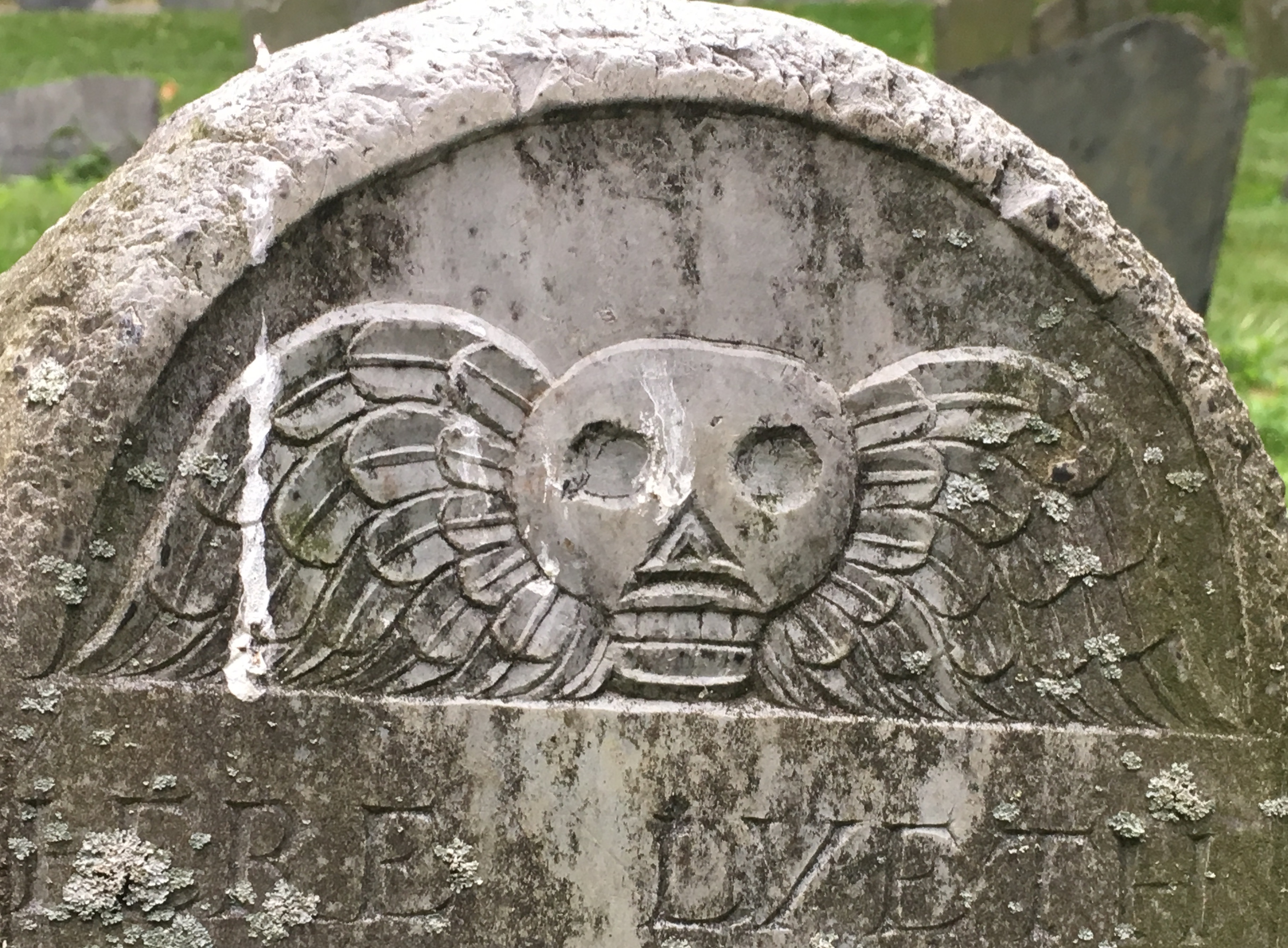
Stone carving by William Mumford, Granary Burying Ground.

The craftsmen behind the early headstones were generalist tradesmen who also worked as smiths, leather-workers or printers. They tended to work locally rather than as itinerant journeyman. Many surviving headstones share decorative traditions, although with some regional variations. The oldest known professional colonial grave carver was George Griswold (1633–1704) of Windsor, Connecticut, active between the 1640s and 1690s. His earliest surviving work is an enclosed 1644 table marker for the Reverend Ephraim Huit of the First Church of Windsor. The Boston region experienced rapid population growth in the mid to late 17th century, prompting the need for full-time grave carvers. While the names of these carvers are unknown, the earliest identified "hand" worked from 1665 until the turn of the century and is known as the "Old Stone Cutter", “Charlestown Master”, or "Old Stone Cutter of Charlestown". Two of his known apprentices—William Mumford and Joseph Lamson— built their own workshops.

Through probate documentation, newspapers and inscriptions, historians have identified individual carvers behind particular headstones. Some 300 carvers working in New England have been identified, although very little is known about the majority of them. Exceptions include John Lamson of Ipswich, Gershom Bartlett of Bolton, William Mumford of Boston, Josiah Manning and his sons Fredrick and Rockwell of Franklin, John Zuricher of Manhattan, the James Foster family of Dorchester, The Stevens Family of Newport, and Nathaniel Holmes (active c. 1805) of Plymouth among others. Other successful early stone carvers include Gershom Bartlett (1723 – 1798) and Zerubbabel Collins (1733–1797).

By the mid-18th century, stone-carving had become an industry with its own system of apprenticeships and workshops. Although not considered a fine art, stone crafting required skill and knowledge, including selecting fine stone from rock outcroppings, shaping them, preparing their faces and carving the reliefs. Different carving schools emerged across New England, including The John Stevens Shop in Newport, and the Rhode Island carvers Gabriel Allen and Charles Hartshorn, most of whom worked from local slate. The Connecticut River valley was prized for its brownstone quarries, which were often used by the region's grave carvers. Portland, Connecticut in particular had one of the largest brownstone quarries, and many carvers were based there due to the ample supply of material. Families such as the Stanclifts and Johnsons emerged, with generations of tradesmen perfecting the art of carving from soft, malleable stone. Brownstone was prized due to its manipulative properties making it easier to carve elaborate designs when compared to Granite Schist or Slate, though ironically, these characteristics made the stone more prone to weathering and erosion than the latter materials.

Materials used depended on the region, varying from slate, brownstone, schist, shale, and gneiss. Later, marble became fashionable in the early 19th century and phased out most other materials. Early puritan era carvers were especially preoccupied by the economy of line, geometric shapes and, at times abstract patterns. They exhibit an unstyled, primitive approach that tends towards simplicity and naturalism. As this aesthetic did not re-emerge in later American art, it became, according to the historian Allan Ludwig, as a "half-finished experiment in form making. Its place...must therefore be described as one of quiet isolation. Nothing of the older tradition remained after 1815 but the silence of a forgotten epoch."

== Attitude towards death ==
Although modern Western culture tends to avoid the reality of the disposal of its dead, in Puritan society, it was a common fact of life. Thus, their art reflects a pragmatic approach, embracing realistic imagery that evokes human decay into skulls and bones. Their use of simplistic, line-drawn imagery was a deliberate rejection of Catholic iconography, a choice also reflected in the design of their churches, portrait paintings and stained glass. However, in a society that largely rejected visual art as idolatry, images created for funeral rites and headstones themselves were among the few artworks most people in this period would be exposed to.

Puritan grave art reflects a deliberate move away from the European High Baroque type. Because its first-generation craftsmen developed their craft in isolation in the new world, as self-taught, their works can be described as folk art, expressed in a vernacular style. In this, their output reflects a general move towards a more vernacular and direct mode of expression, but practically the style allowed the production of a far greater number of stylized headstones by removing the need for the carvers having deep workshop experience. Although the New England style was heavily influenced by contemporary or slightly earlier trends in rural England and Scotland, this was more in terms of iconography and symbols than style. New England art of the time avoided Biblical allegories and depictions of the Christian cross.

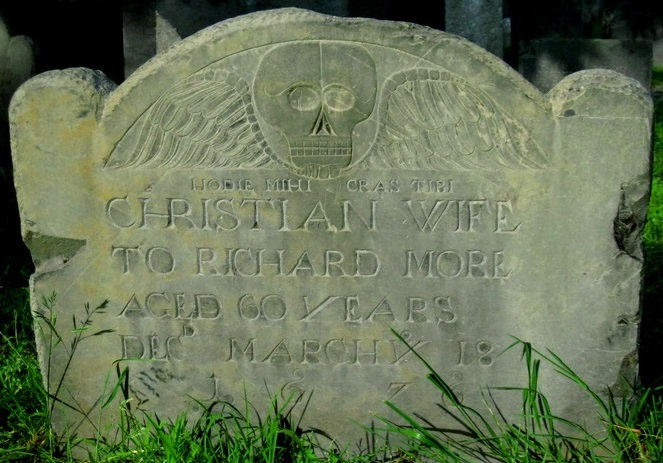
Gravestone of Christian Hunter More, wife of Richard More, Carved by "Old Stone Cutter of Charlestown". The Burying Point, Salem, Massachusetts

Late 19th-century academics tended to view older graveyards as basically museums that were, as the historian Richard Meyer observed, distant "outdoor, spatially delineated repositories of cultural artefacts". Modern historians see them as unique artefacts which provide insight into the thoughts and beliefs of the people buried within. Expanding on this, the historian Terry G. Jordan said that, given the artifact's density and state of preservation in New England, "nowhere else [in America] is it possible to look so deeply into our people's past". Meyer's takes this further, writing that the grave art of this period "exhibit patterns of change over temporal spans...and...can in many instances yield valuable cultural insights to a number of discrete time periods, including the present." Following Forbes work, researchers applied social sciences techniques in interpretation.

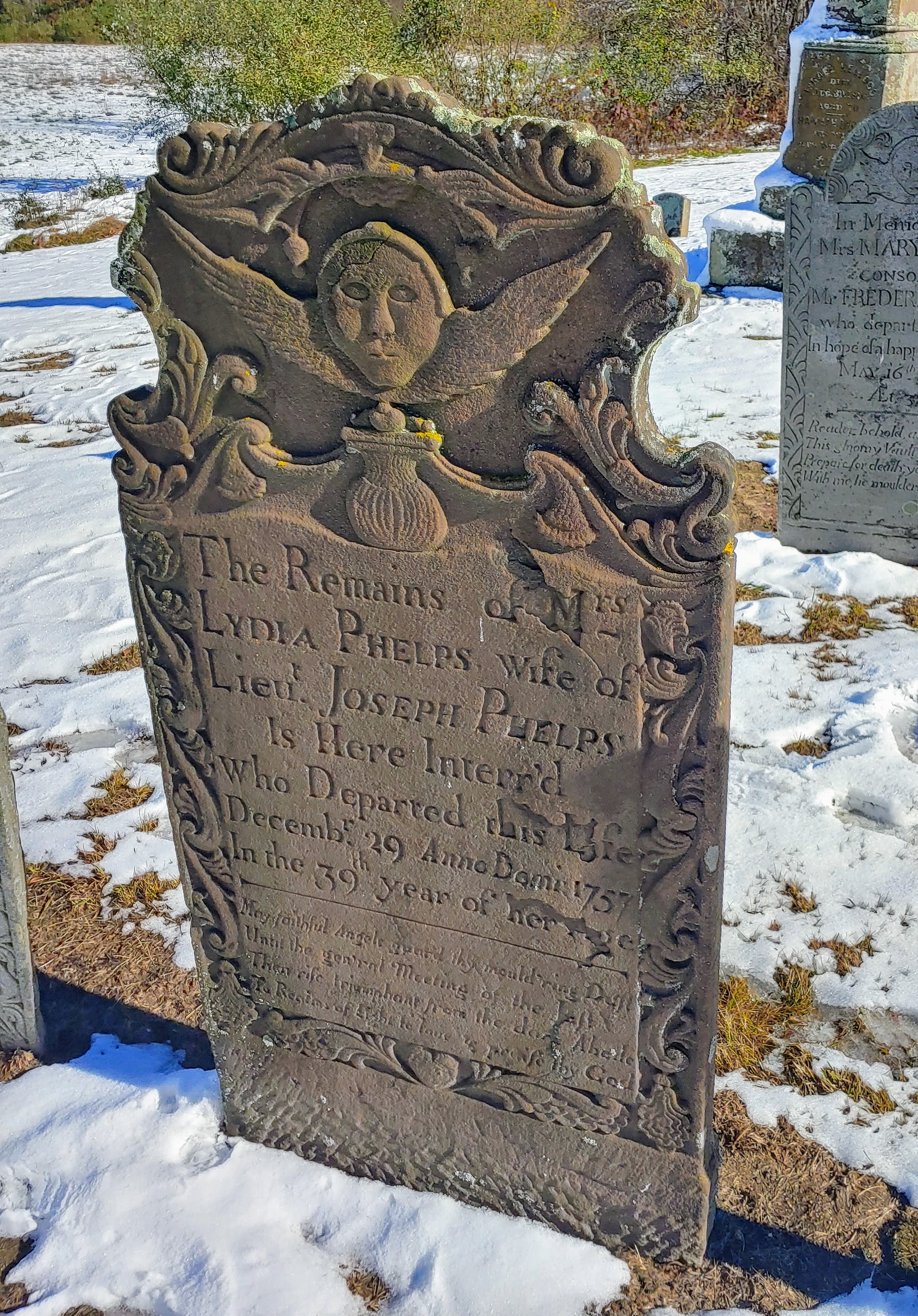
Brownstone marker carved by Thomas Johnson II, Old Hebron Cemetery, Hebron, Connecticut

In 1983, the historian James Hijiya raised concerns about the prevailing academic approach and methodology and argued that, given that the early carvers left no account of their intentions, no credible inference could be made on their "outlook on life and death." A significant scholar in the field, Hijiya argued that any reading into the meaning of any stone has to consider "information extraneous to the stones themselves", such as "writings produced at the same time as the carvings, though by different hands [and] aesthetic or anthropological theory which purports to illuminate human behavior at any time". He suggested an approach similar to the art historian Erwin Panofsky; that there is no reason to assume that any decoration is "uniquely determined."

== Styles ==
In contrast to contemporary US headstones, the remaining early Puritan examples are low in size and wide. They are often capped with a rounded tympanum resembling the semi-circular half-stones often found above the central doorway entrances into churches. The tympanum thus has symbolic meaning, reflecting the belief that through death, the soul moves from one world into the next. The theologian and minister William Perkins wrote that death was "a little wicket or doore whereby we passe out of this world and enter into heaven." This belief is also evident in some of the inscriptions, where the date of death is prefaced by terms such as "translated" or "exchanged" rather than "died". The phrase "Here Lies the Body" (or "Here lyes Buried the Body") makes this more explicit, implying that while the remains are present in the ground below, the soul has gone elsewhere.

Hijiya divides Northeastern American gravestones into six broad and overlapping styles, which he says are reflective of "six different attitudes toward death". Of these, the first three are strictly "Puritan", made before the style softened into Unitarianism and Methodism imagery. The six styles as described by Hijiya are:

1. "Plain Style" (1640–1710)
2. "Death's Head" (1670–1770)
3. "Cherubs" / "Angels" (1740–1820)
4. "Urn and Willow" (1780–1850)
5. "Monumentalism" (1840–1920)
6. "Modern Plain Style" (1900–2001)

=== Plain Style ===
The first generation of settlers did not build communal burial grounds; instead, they buried their dead on the highest point on their property and marked individual graves with wooden slabs or fieldstones. The earliest New England Puritan burying grounds date from the 1630s, and were, according to writer Meg Greene, "simply places to deposit the remains of the dead". In adherence to the second biblical commandment, "Thou shalt not make unto thee any graven image", the earliest settlers sought to avoid the worship of ancestors through stone images. In addition, they sought to avoid the use of the traditional Catholic cross, while table-type tombs were seen as too elaborate, practically and aesthetically. The graves had little order to their plotting, (Note: Individual plots were often dug in random spots in the burial ground.) and were either unmarked or were marked by a wooden sign or an uncut rock, with only very few having simple greenstone or carved headstone, usually with no decorations or ornamentation.

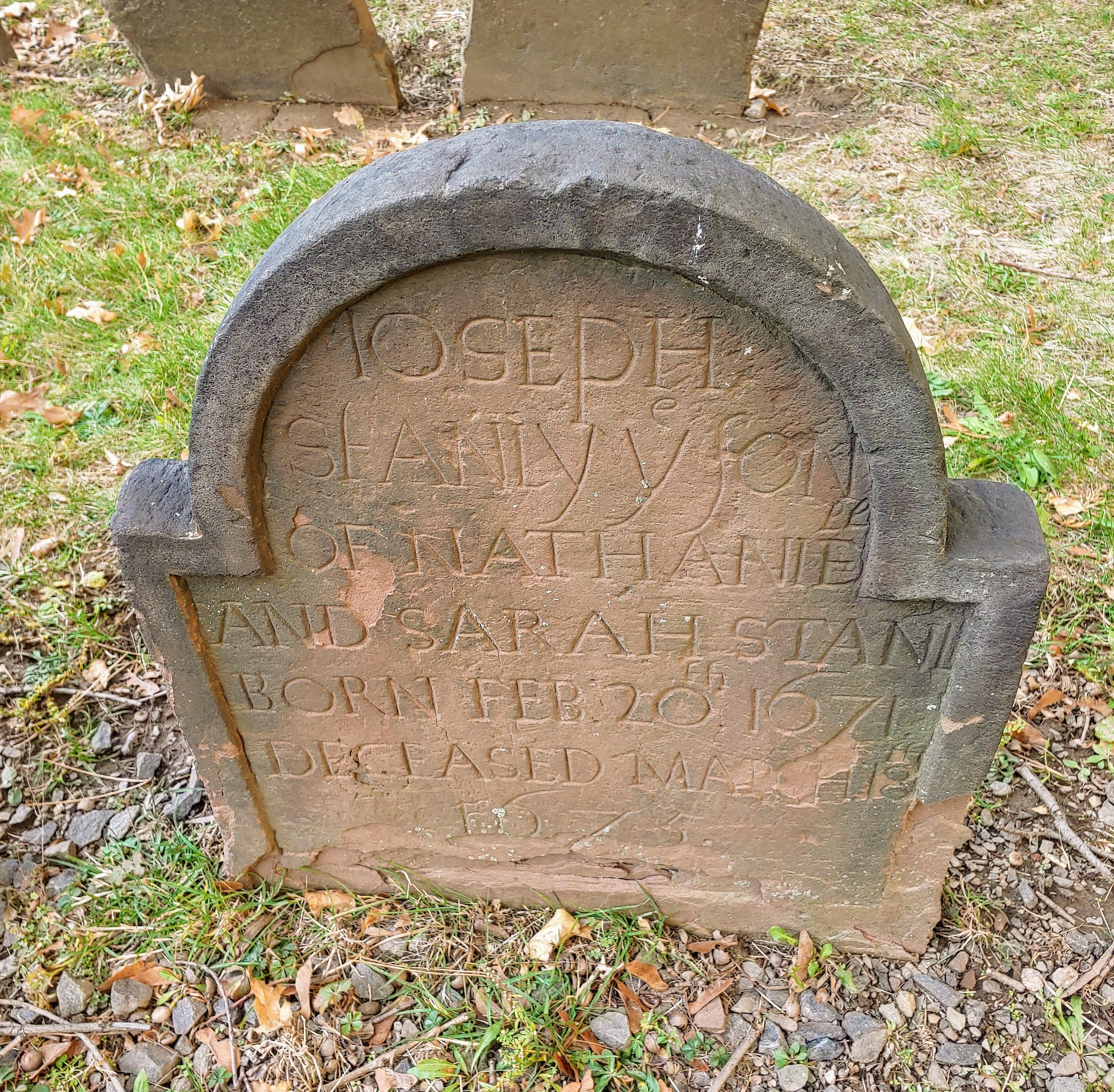
Example of the early plain style on this tombstone carved by George Griswold dated 1675. Hartford Ancient Burying Ground

The earliest known New England stonecutters were George Griswold and his uncle Matthew, who settled in Windsor, Connecticut around 1640. Matthew carved the oldest known grave marker in the New World, a table monument made of Windsor brownstone for the Rev. Ephriam Huit dated 1644 which stands in the Palisado Cemetery in Windsor today. Both Matthew and George Griswold would continue carving both walled tomb-style markers and normal headstones until the end of the 17th century. When inscriptions began to be used, they were at first brief, factual and typically carved with "interruptive punctuation", that is an interpunct (raised period), between each word. Full names, kinship, age at death and the year of death are given, while the dating of placement of the stone itself is also present; typically they were commissioned and erected within a year of the burial.

The headstones became increasingly elaborate during the mid-17th century, and characterized by stonework imagery describing the nature and frequency of death in dark, bleak and often bitter imagery. In 1980, the historian Peter Benes described the imagery in a Plymouth County graveyard as containing "menacing stares, impish smiles, and enigmatic facial contortions combine with totally abstract effigies to stop the modern viewer in his tracks, while revealing little of their significance".

The Plain Style is characterized by smaller headstone markers with unornamented and bluntly factual inscriptions. It begins in the very early Colonial period and lasts until roughly the first decade of the eighteenth century. In most scholarly overviews, the amateurish carvings are attributed to a lack of tools and know-how among the very early practitioners, who did have access to more experienced stonemasons. This explains in part why it remained in some areas later than others; with craftsmen in some areas developing their skills quicker than in others. A further reason may be that the early Puritans, due to their feelings of humility and lack of regard for adornments, deliberately kept their headstones simple and minimalist. Hijiya goes on to say that the lack of decoration may have reflected that they viewed death as simply an "ordinary, unremarkable aspect of the human condition", absent from any notion of either oblivion or passing on to ethereal life.

=== Death's head ===
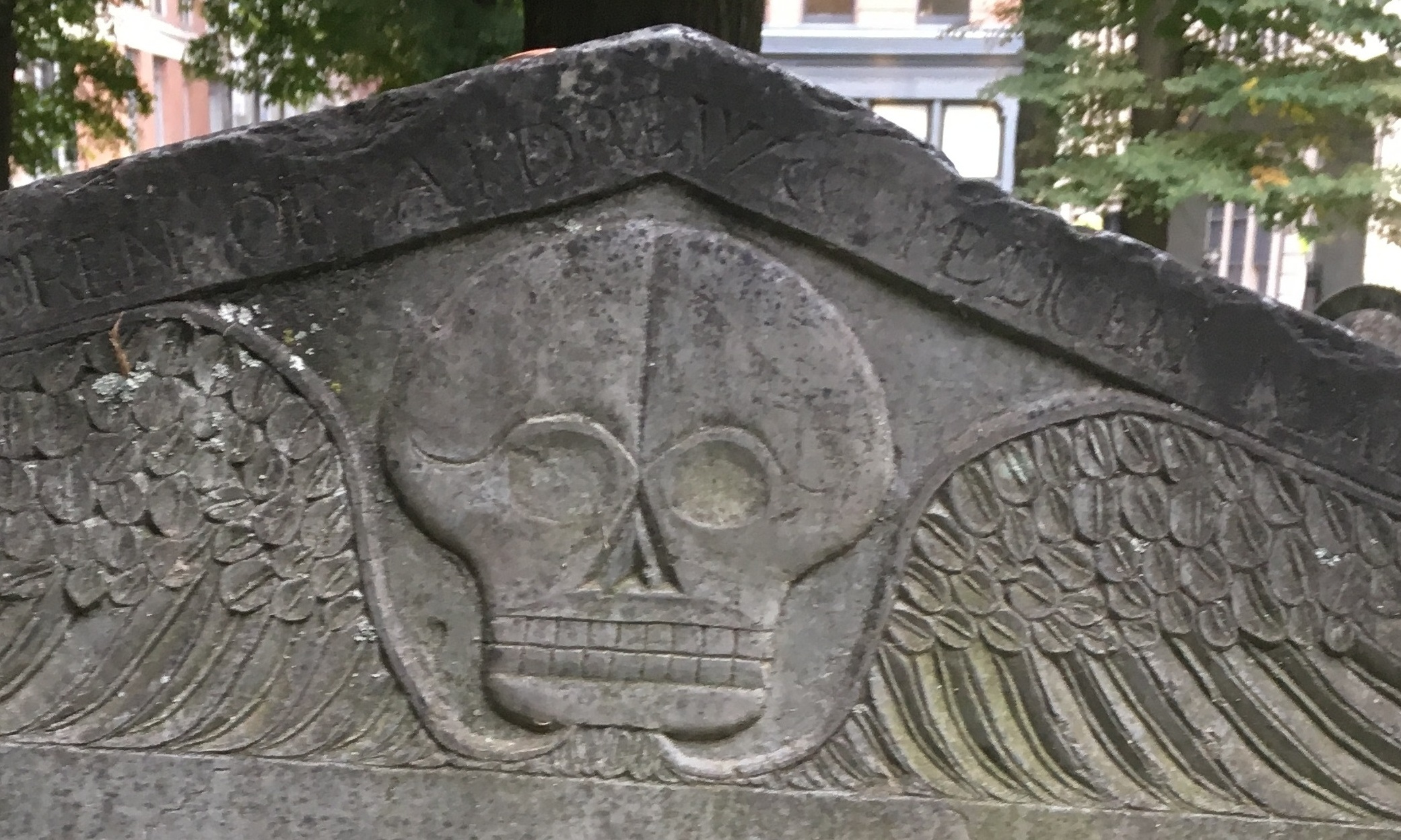
Winged death headstone carved by the "Old Stone Cutter of Charlestown" Granary, Boston. 17th century

The death's head is the earliest and most frequently occurring motif in colonial-era American headstones. The head is usually winged and decorated with imagery such as hourglasses, bones and coffins. Though seemingly frightening to modern viewers, skulls were then less about dread than acknowledging death as an everyday fact of human life. In the Puritans' belief system, death was the moment when the flesh passed away to make way for renewal in the afterlife. The skulls reflect Puritan funeral rituals in total, including their approach to elegies, funerals rites and sermons. Commonly, the horses carrying the remains of the deceased to the graveyard were draped with robes containing painted coffins and death's heads. Burial usually took place three to eight days after death, with the headstone erected up to eight months later.

Before the English colonies were fully established and had fully functioning economies, burial rituals were expensive; a relatively elaborate funeral in Boston in the 1720s would have cost around £100. (Note: To put in context, in the 1720s a well-to-do family would spend c. £300 per year.) The headstones were a relatively small part of the overall expense; in the 1720s headstones ranged from £2 to over £40.

By the mid-18th century, the death's head became less stern and menacing. The figure was often crowned, the lower jaw was eliminated, and serrations of teeth appeared on the upper row. The eyes became more animated, sometimes almond-shaped, with pupils that gave it a more soul-like than deathlike appearance. Death's head designs became less common from the 1780s and began to die out in the 1800s.

Other motifs such as foliage, grapes, vines and hearts, suggest new life through sacraments and resurrection. This transition cannot be clearly or easily seen through the gravestones. The changes are very minute and gradual, leaving some stones with a disturbing image in between an empty skull and a lively soul. Other motifs from this era include imps of death depicted as small evil demons bearing the arrows of death. They are particularly associated with the Charlestown grave carver Joseph Lamson, who carved imps either pallbearing or adorned with imagery of death and decay such as scythes and hourglasses.

=== Cherubs ===
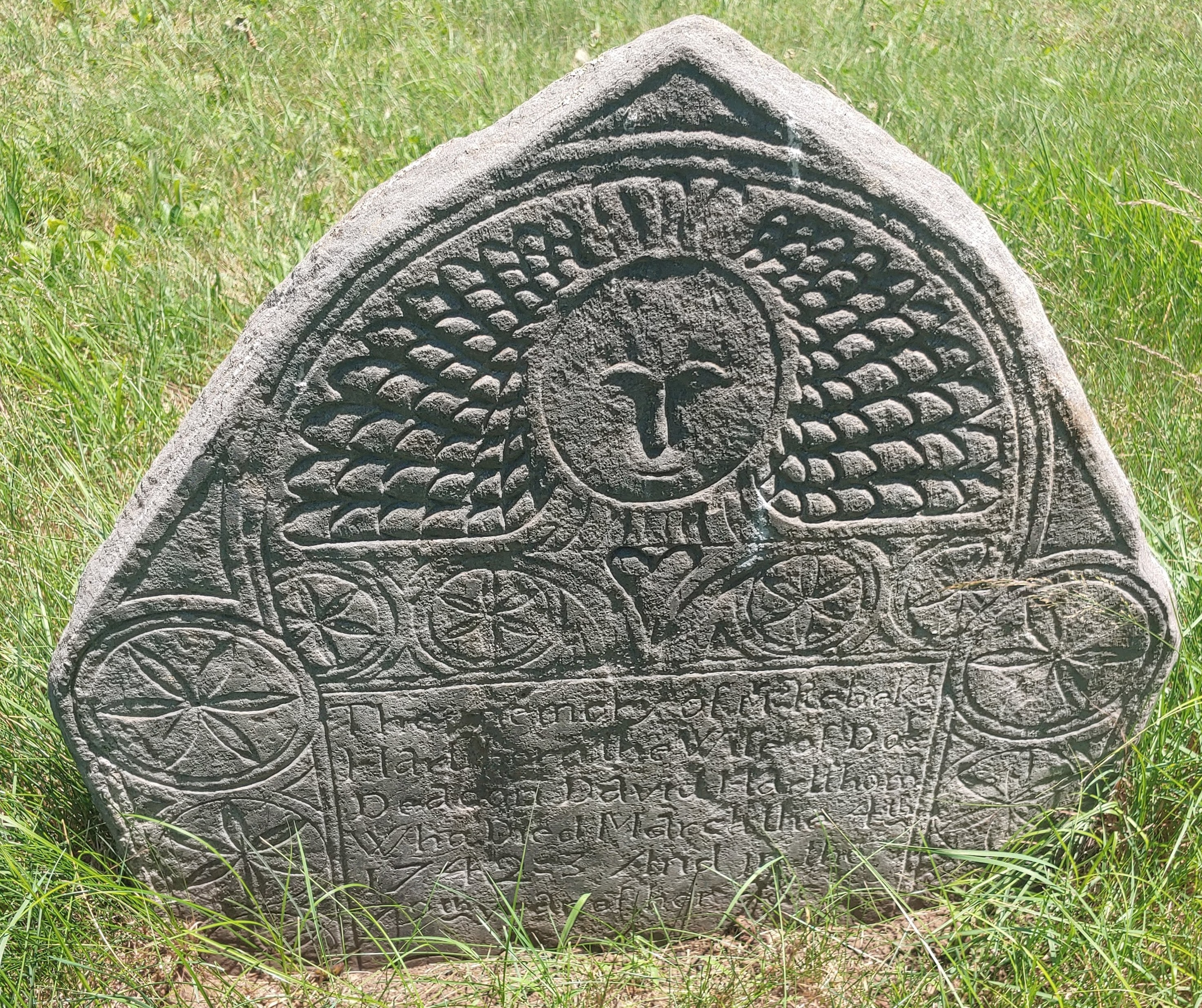
Winged Cherub effigy featured on a schist marker carved by Obadiah Wheeler in 1742. Plains Cemetery, Franklin, Connecticut

Continuing the evolution of winged death heads, cherubs (or "soul effigies") are skull-shaped effigies with distinctly human faces intended to represent the deceased's soul. Some are placed in an enclosing motif, such as a solar symbol or a tree. Others retain the angel's wings commonly seen in the death head.

The use of cherubs became commonplace in the Boston area in the mid-18th century. They are more commonly found in southern rather than northern parts of New England, especially in Rhode Island and Connecticut, where from the beginning of the 18th century, the majority of headstone designs were of Cherub or Winged Soul effigies. Some of these cherubs have individualized faces that may contain elements of portraiture. In Eastern Massachusetts, those on male graves tend to have hair with a downward curl, while those marking female graves show an upward curl.

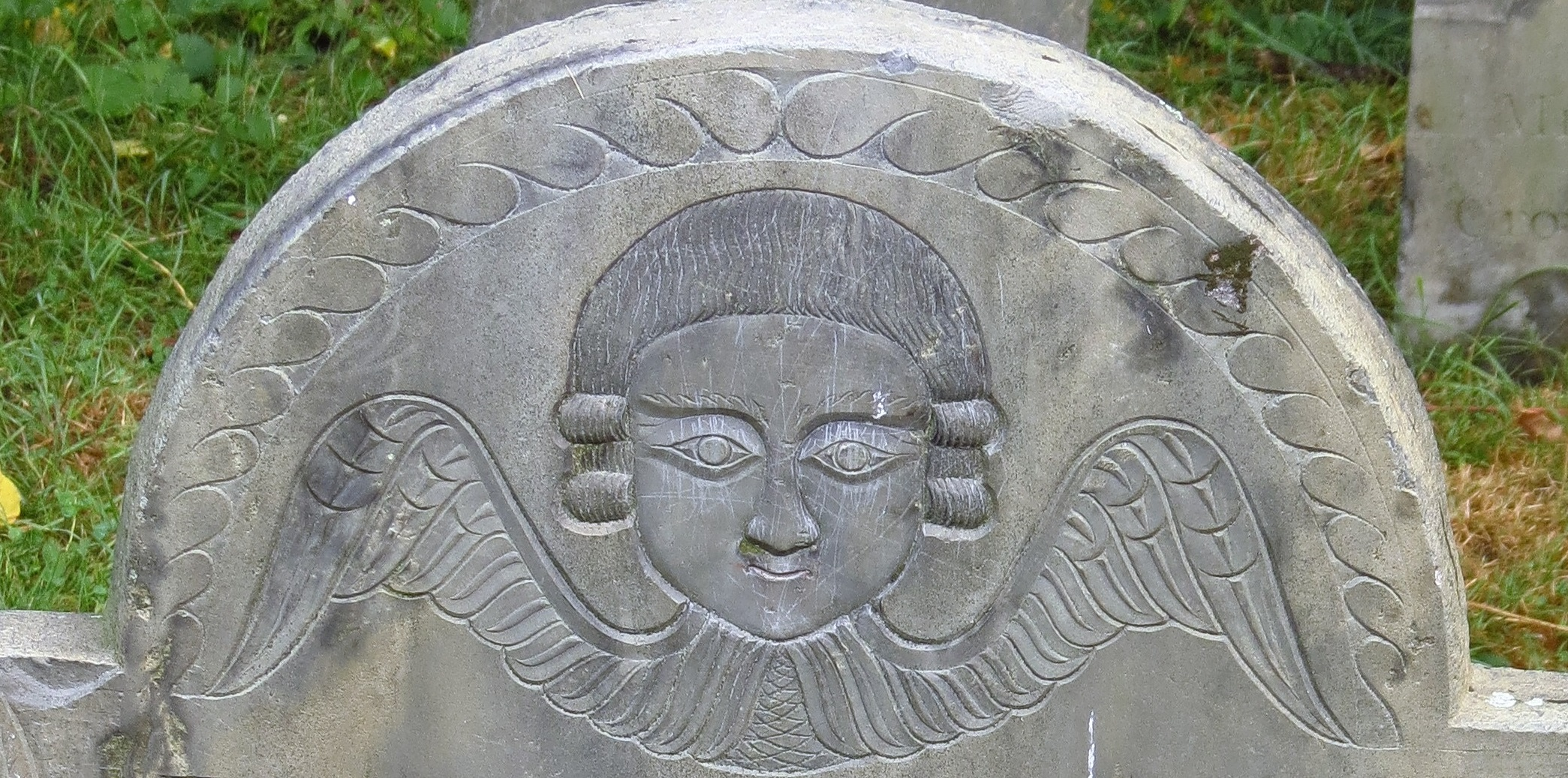
Cherub, 1777. The Burying Point, Salem, Massachusetts

The Boston cherubs mostly date from the mid-18th century to around 1810 and often show a living human arched by wings. The John Stevens Shop in Newport began using Cherub effigies as early as 1705, and carvers in the Merrimack Valley region began using soul/cherub designs in the 1680s. One such carver, John Hartshorne of Rowley, Massachusetts began carving graves around 1680 in the region, until around 1710 when he moved to Franklin, Connecticut and continued carving until his death in 1737, thus introducing the cherub design to the region. Soon carvers such as Obadiah Wheeler of Lebanon and Benjamin Collins of Columbia began adopting soul effigies and other designs inspired by Hartshorne's work. This is just one example of how regional designs spread among carvers during the colonial era.

=== Urn and Willow ===
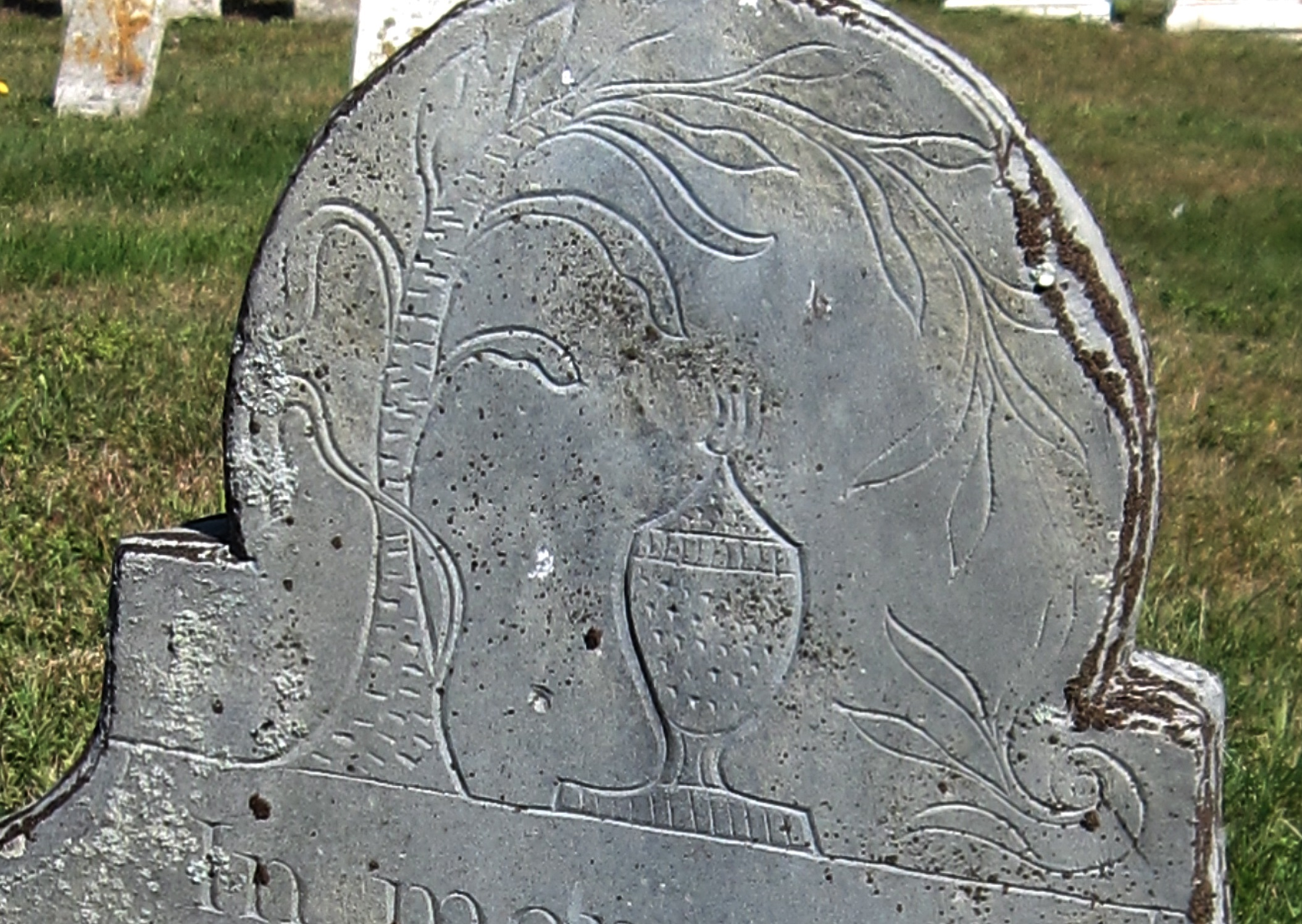
Urn and willow, on the gravestone of Lois Witham (d.1800). Old Burial Ground, Rockport MA

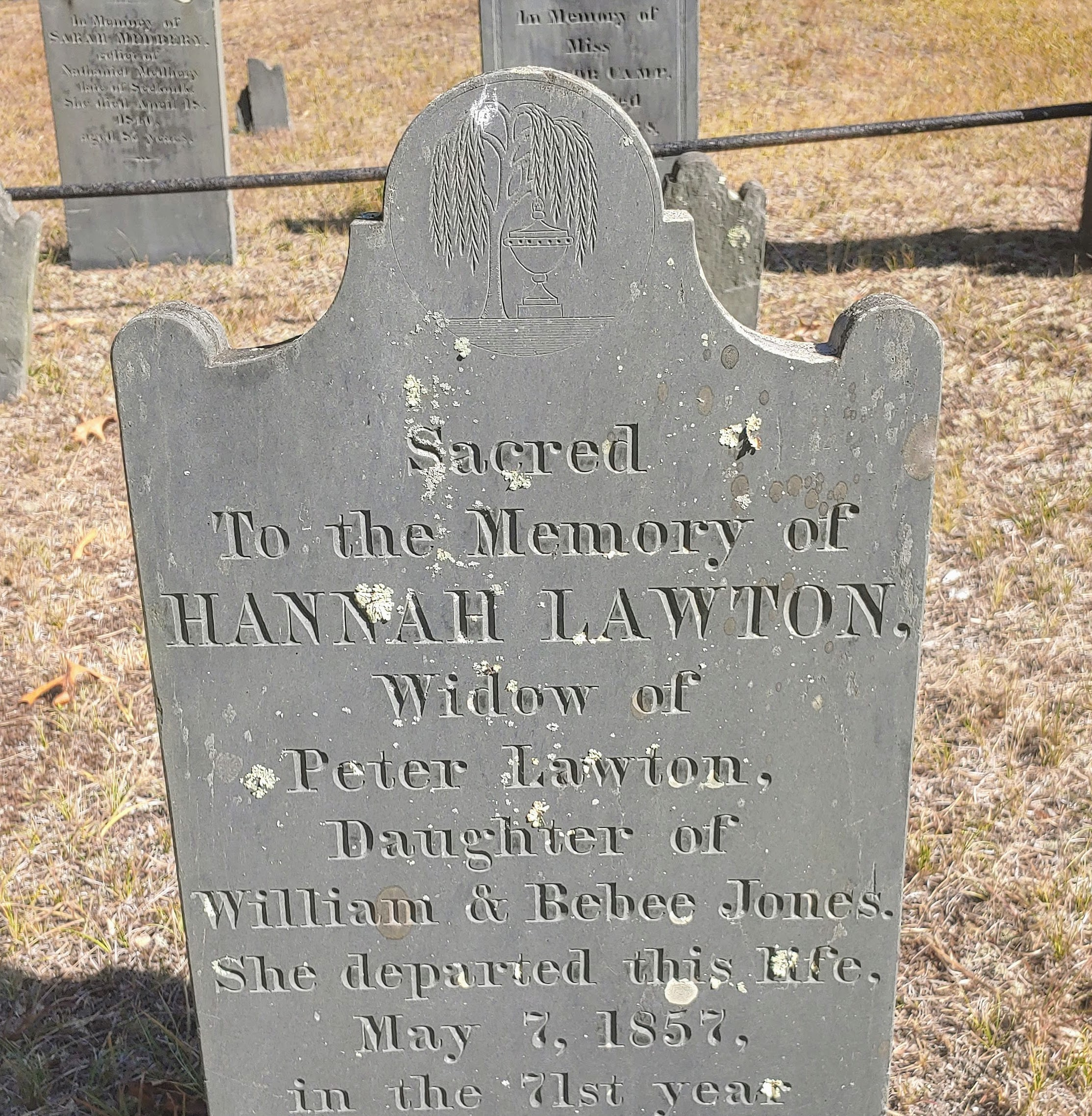
Slate urn and willow marker. Little Neck Cemetery, Providence, Rhode Island

The rise of secularism during the Federalist Era, roughly 1790 to 1820, saw the prominence of urns and willows on New England headstones. During this period, the imagery turned away from English influences in favour of Neoclassicism and Greek Revival style. So began the decline in Puritan influence. During the first two decades of the 19th century, elaborate borders on headstones were rapidly replaced by simple lines and sometimes abstract designs. Often borders resembling pillars were used, further exemplifying the neoclassical influence during this time. Along with Urns and Willows, sometimes designs featuring sunsets were used instead, particularly by Rhode Island stonecutters.

=== Monumentalism ===
By the early 19th century, as social classes emerged and became more important, graveyards lost their earlier egalitarian uniformity and simplicity; up until that point, all headstones were of similar size and plots were grouped together. Plots in some regions of existing graveyards became more expensive as a marked difference emerged between cemeteries in well-off as compared to less affluent areas. The graveyards of the former tended towards grandiosity and monumentalism, while the latter are characterized by crowded rows of simple headstones. The change was especially seen from the 1840s onwards, when a trend towards integrating nature and landscape emerged, leading to the use of obelisks, columns, and statues, while the use of slate, brownstone and schist was largely phased out in favor of marble. In addition, disease and odor concerns in urbanized areas pushed graveyards toward the outskirts of towns and cities, no longer an integral part of the central landscape. It is at this point that the Puritan traditions in funerary art end.

The historian Karen Batignani describes New England headstones from 1900 as "far less interesting than their predecessors. Polished granite blocks that offer names and dates but few clues as to who the deceased were." She, like other historians, attributes this to a culture of the denial of death, in which large sums of money are spent on "steel-lined, gorgeously cushioned caskets [and] air-conditioned tombs".

== Inscriptions ==
=== Epitaphs ===
Epitaphs become common from the later 17th century. From these, it becomes possible to tell something of the attitudes and outlook of both the masons and the deceased. They often take the format of memento moris:

Remember me as you pass by
As you are now so once was I
As I am now you soon must be
Prepare for death and follow me

These early examples reflect the pessimistic Puritan outlook of the time. They rarely mention an afterlife or the resurrection of the dead, while the texts often include imagery of worms, decay, and dust. It is only on the much later cherub stones that more personalized goodbyes to loved ones, or mention of an afterlife, begin to appear:

Farewell my wife and children dear
I leave you for a while
For God has called and I must go
And leave you all behind.

== Historiography ==
The academic study of early Puritan funerary art is a relatively new field. During the 1920s, the historian and photographer Harriette Forbes and the historian Ernest Caulfield produced the first significant catalogue of 16th-century Massachusetts graves. Her book Gravestones of Early New England and the Men Who Made Them, 1653-1800 classified and interprets the artifacts in the context of the dominant religious and cultural influences of their times. The influential Puritan minister, author, and pamphleteer Cotton Mather observed in 1693 how "the stones in this wilderness are already grown so witty as to speak".

Modern scholars take a more circumspect view, noting that most early carvers were amateurs and although they had a basic understanding of iconography, their style and language evolved in a setting cut off from European trends or a coherent, internal, and shared discourse. The historian Richard Meyer largely agrees with Mather's claim. He notes how the path of study of these early graveyards understood that such artifacts, "through a variety of complex and often interrelated manifestations, establish patterns of communication (and even dynamic interaction) with those who use or view them". The next major publication was Allen Ludwig's 1966 book Graven Images: New England Stone Carving and its Symbols, 1650–1815.

Reflecting the number of surviving examples, in 2006, philosopher of science James Blachowicz produced a catalogue of 8000 stones and 713 individual burial grounds. He lists some 1300 stones that are signed or have been documented and made a significant contribution to the methodology used to attribute headstones to individual carvers. In particular, he identifies 60 sets of typefaces and provides a detailed overview of how styles of representing letters, numbers and symbols could be used to group headstones by their carvers.

== Sources ==
- Ancient Burying Ground Association, Inc. "The Makers of the Markers: A Walking Tour of Colonial Stonecutter Art, Ancient Burying Ground Hartford, CT".
- Batignani, Karen. Maine's Coastal Cemeteries. Lanham MD: Down East Books, 2003. ISBN 0-8927-2604-0
- Benes, Peter; Montague Benes; Jane. Puritan Gravestone Art II. Boston, MA: Boston University, 1978
- Dethlefsen, Edwin; Deetz, James. "Death's Heads, Cherubs, and Willow Trees: Experimental Archaeology in Colonial Cemeteries", American Antiquity, 1966. pp. 502–510
- Eriquez, Christina. Our History In Stone: The New England Cemetery Dictionary. lulu, 2010. ISBN 978-0-5572-4169-9
- Garvan, Anthony. "The New England Plain Style". Comparative Studies in Society and History, volume 3, no. 1, 1960. JSTOR 177900
- Gilson, William. "Stone Faces". New England Review, Vol. 30, No. 4, 2009/2010. JSTOR 25656088
- Greene, Meg. Rest in Peace: A History of American Cemeteries . CT: Twenty-First Century Books, 2007. ISBN 0-8225-3414-2
- Hijiya, James. "American Gravestones and Attitudes Toward Death: A Brief History". Proceedings of the American Philosophical Society, vol. 127, No. 5 (Oct. 14, 1983). JSTOR 986503
- Ludwig, Allan. Graven Images: New England Stone Carving and its Symbols, 1650-1815. CT: Wesleyan University Press, 2000. ISBN 0-8195-6040-5
- Merrifield Forbes, Harriette . Gravestones of Early New England and the Men Who Made Them, 1653-1800. Pyne Press, 1927.
- Meyer, Richard. Cemeteries and Gravemarkers: Voices of American Culture. MI: Umi Research Press, 1989. ISBN 0-8357-1903-0
- Neal, Avon. "Graven Images: Sermons in Stones". Americal Heritage, Volume XXI, no. 5, August 1970
- Prioli, Carmine. "Review: Early New England Gravestone Scholarship". Early American Literature, Volume 14, no. 3, Winter, 1979/1980
- Roark, Elisabeth. Artists of Colonial America. Westport, CT: Greenwood Press, 2003. ISBN 0-3133-2023-3
- Seeman, Erik. Speaking with the Dead in Early America. University of Pennsylvania Press, 2019. ISBN 978-0-8122-5153-1
- Shapleigh-Brown, Ruth. "The Cemeteries of Hebron, Connecticut: Their Historic Monuments, Stone Carvers and Care Archived 2023-12-23 at the Wayback Machine". The Hebron Historic Properties Commission & The Hebron Historical Society, October 27, 2013
- Tashjian, Dickran; Tashjian, Ann. Memorials for Children of Change: The Art of Early New England Gravestone Carving. Wesleyan, 1974. ISBN 0-8195-4061-7
- Yal-om, Marilyn. The American Resting Place: 400 Years of History Through Our Cemeteries and Burial Grounds. Houghton Mifflin Harcourt, 2008. ISBN 978-0-6186-2427-0
- Wood, Mary Catherine. "Book Review: James Blachowicz. From Slate to Marble: Gravestone Carving Traditions in Eastern Massachusetts, 1770–1870". Winterthur Portfolio 42, no. 4, Winter 2008
