= Nathaniel Holmes (stonecarver) =

New England gravestone carver (1783–1869)

Nathaniel Holmes (1783–1869) was an American stone carver from Plymouth, Massachusetts who became Cape Cod's first resident gravestone carver. During his 70-year career he created approximately 1500 gravestones on Cape Cod and in the Plymouth area. The majority of his works are slate, though he also created stones in marble.

His own grave is in Cobb's Hill Cemetery, Barnstable, Barnstable County, Massachusetts.
