= Gershom Bartlett =

Colonial New England Gravestone carver

Coordinates: 41°21′33″N 72°6′1″W

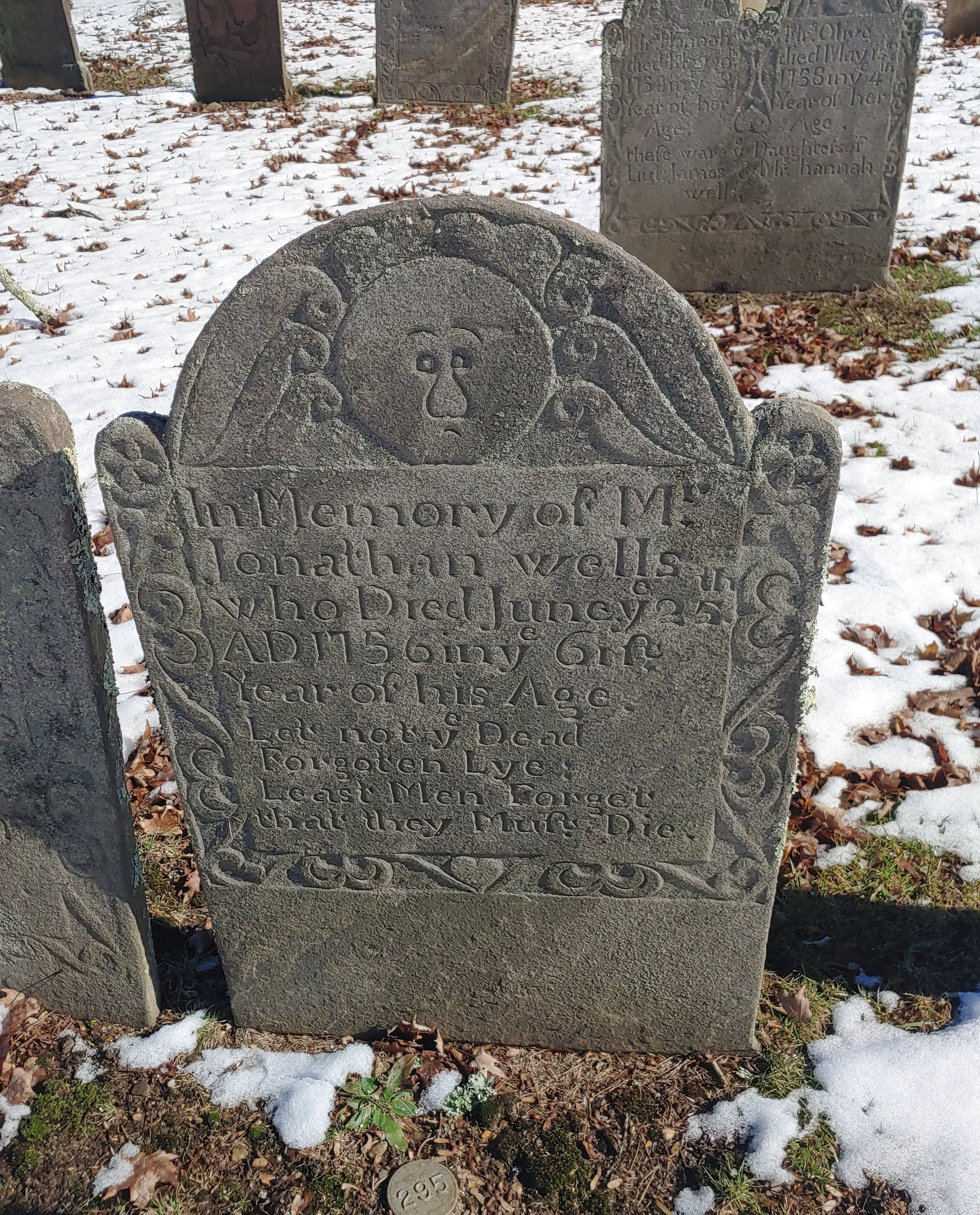
- Schist headstone carved by Gershom Bartlett in the Old Burial Ground of Colchester, CT
- Born: February 19, 1723; Bolton, Connecticut, Connecticut River Colony, British America
- Died: December 23, 1798 (aged 75); Pompanoosuc, Windsor County, Vermont, United States
- Occupations: Tombstone Carver, Soldier in French and Indian War & American Revolutionary War
- Years active: 1747−1798

Gershom Bartlett (February 19, 1723 – December 23, 1798) was a stone carver who carved tombstones in colonial Connecticut and Vermont. His carved gravestones are widespread in colonial burying grounds in eastern Connecticut as well as towns in Vermont and New Hampshire near the Connecticut River.

Highly prolific, Bartlett accepted work from both the rich and poor, and produced some 1,000 grave stones. He signed his later works; the rest are attributed from Probate records or deduced based on style. His output has been described as including "some of the strangest, almost bizarre carvings made during the eighteenth century." Bartlett is sometimes referred to as the "Hook and Eye man" due to the unique designs based on the old "Hook and Eye" garment he carved on his stones.

== Early life ==
According to old Bolton church records preserved by the Connecticut Historical Society, Gershom Bartlett was born to Samuel and Sarah Bartlett on February 19, 1723. Gershom moved to Windsor, Connecticut sometime before 1747, and married Margret Darte in 1748.

== Career ==
=== Connecticut ===
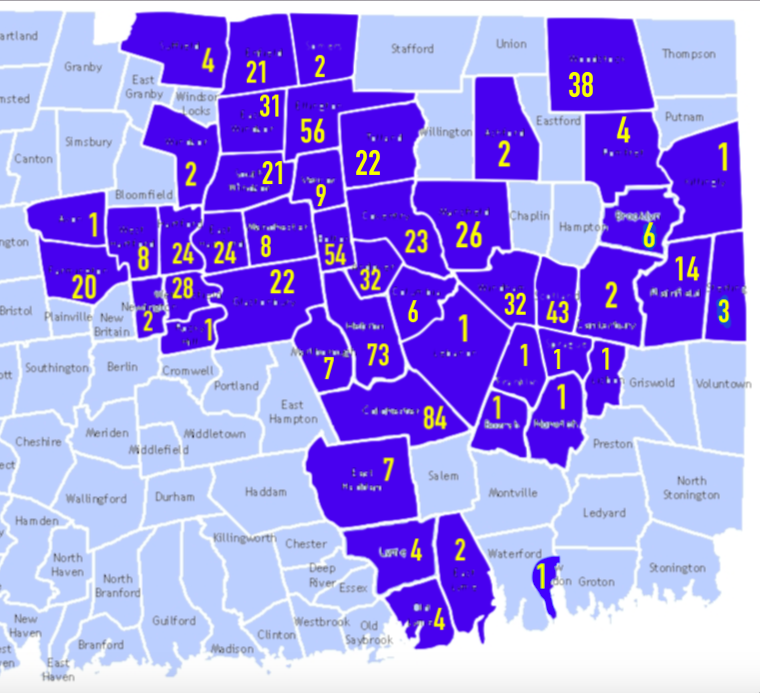
Approximate distribution of gravestones carved by Bartlett in Eastern and Central Connecticut.

Gershom began carving tombstones in 1744. Records show he returned to Bolton, Connecticut in 1751. During the 1750s, he bought and sold land in Bolton, and ended up building a Quarry that would later be known as Bolton Notch Quarry. Through the 1750s, until 1773, Gershom carved over 700 gravestones out of his Bolton workshop. His stones were almost exclusively carved from his quarried granite schist besides a few early brownstones around South Windsor.

His work was the most popular among Burying Grounds in Hebron, CT, Ellington, CT, Colchester, CT, Farmington, CT, Wethersfield, CT, Scotland, CT, Woodstock, CT, Hartford, CT and Windham, CT, and his hometown in Bolton. His quarry became well known for its high quality schist, and other grave carvers sometimes purchased raw material from Bartlett.

Although he usually worked with red sandstone early on, the vast majority of his headstones in the state are made from granite, while he later worked on slate and occasionally marble after moving to Vermont. His earliest known stone in Ellington CT is carved out of Windsor brownstone. Bartlett's work influenced many carvers in Eastern Connecticut long after leaving the region. Such carvers who studied and adopted stylistic elements of Bartlett's work include John Loomis of Coventry, Peter & William Buckland of Manchester, Daniel Ritter of East Hartford, Josiah Manning of Franklin, and Ebenezer Drake of Windsor.

=== Vermont ===
In 1773 due to rising land costs, Bartlett sold the Bolton Notch Quarry and his home and moved his family to Pompanoosuc, Windsor County on the Vermont frontier. He continued his business of gravestone carving, though now out of locally sourced Vermont Slate. During the American Revolutionary War he joined Peter Olcott's Regiment in the Vermont Militia. From 1773 to 1797, Gershom carved around 350 stones that can be found around Windsor, VT, Norwich, VT, Newbury, VT, and East Ryegate, Vermont. His stones were also bought by many in Western New Hampshire especially common in cemeteries in Lebanon, NH, Plainfield, NH, and Orford, NH. In 1778 his wife Margret died leaving 12 children.

== Death ==
He was carving into the 1790s with known examples dating to as late as 1797. Gershom died in 1798 aged 75, and is buried near his wife in the Waterman Hill Cemetery in Pompanoosuc, Vermont.

== Gallery ==
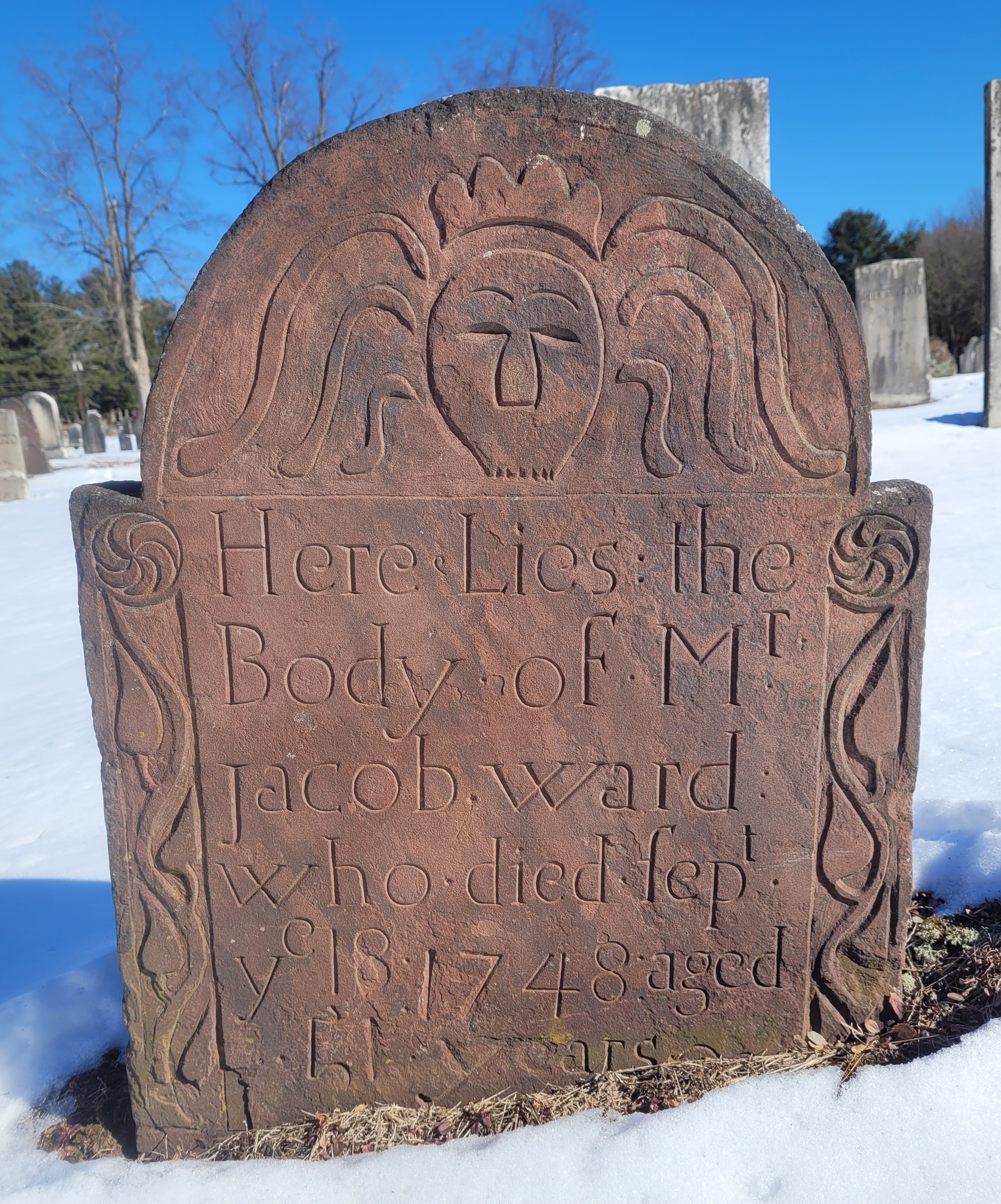
Early example of Bartlett's work on Windsor brownstone, dated 1748. West Cemetery, Somers, Connecticut.

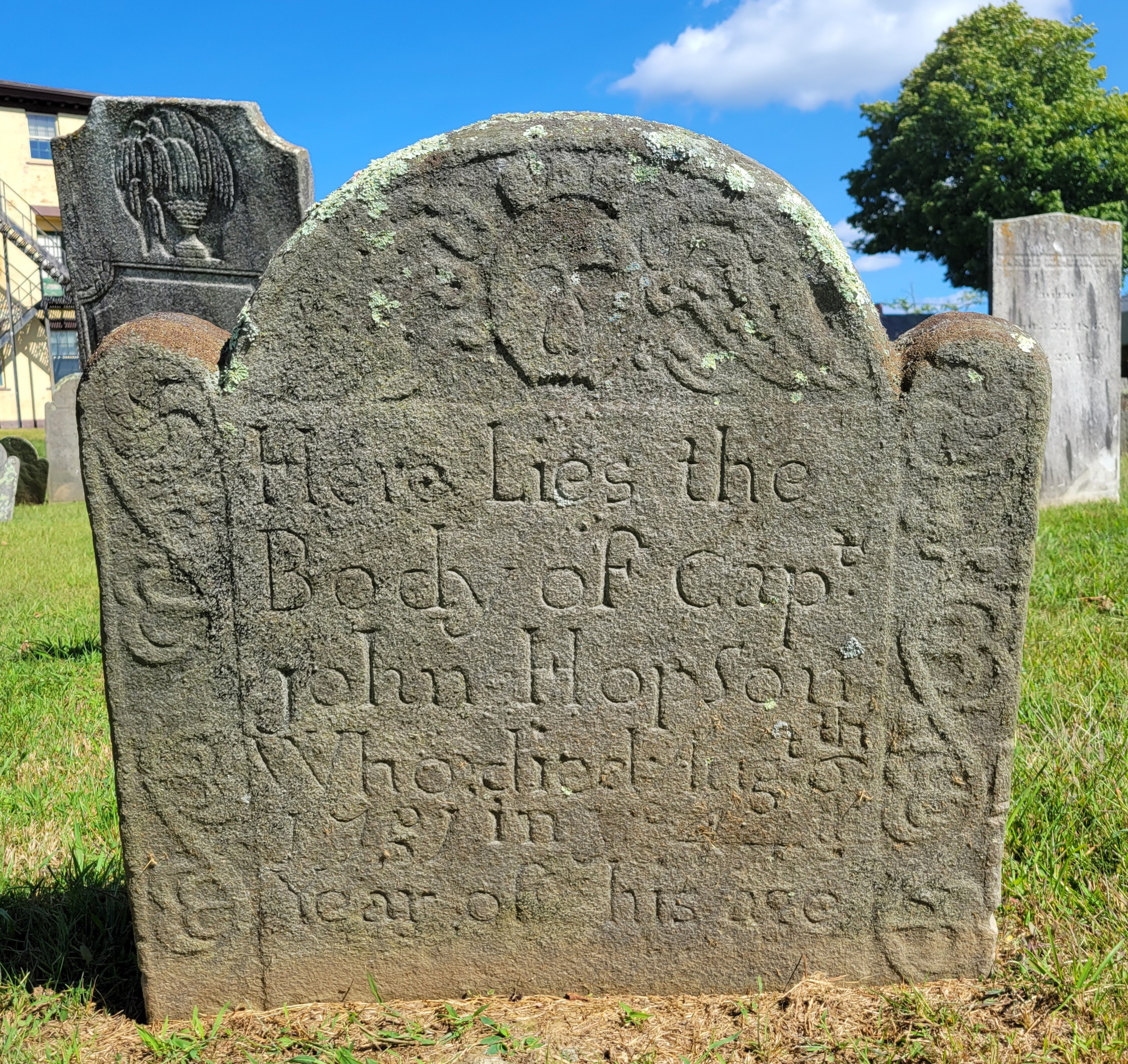
Early Bolton schist marker, note the lack of mouth and wings. Olde Mainstreet Burial Ground, Colchester, CT.

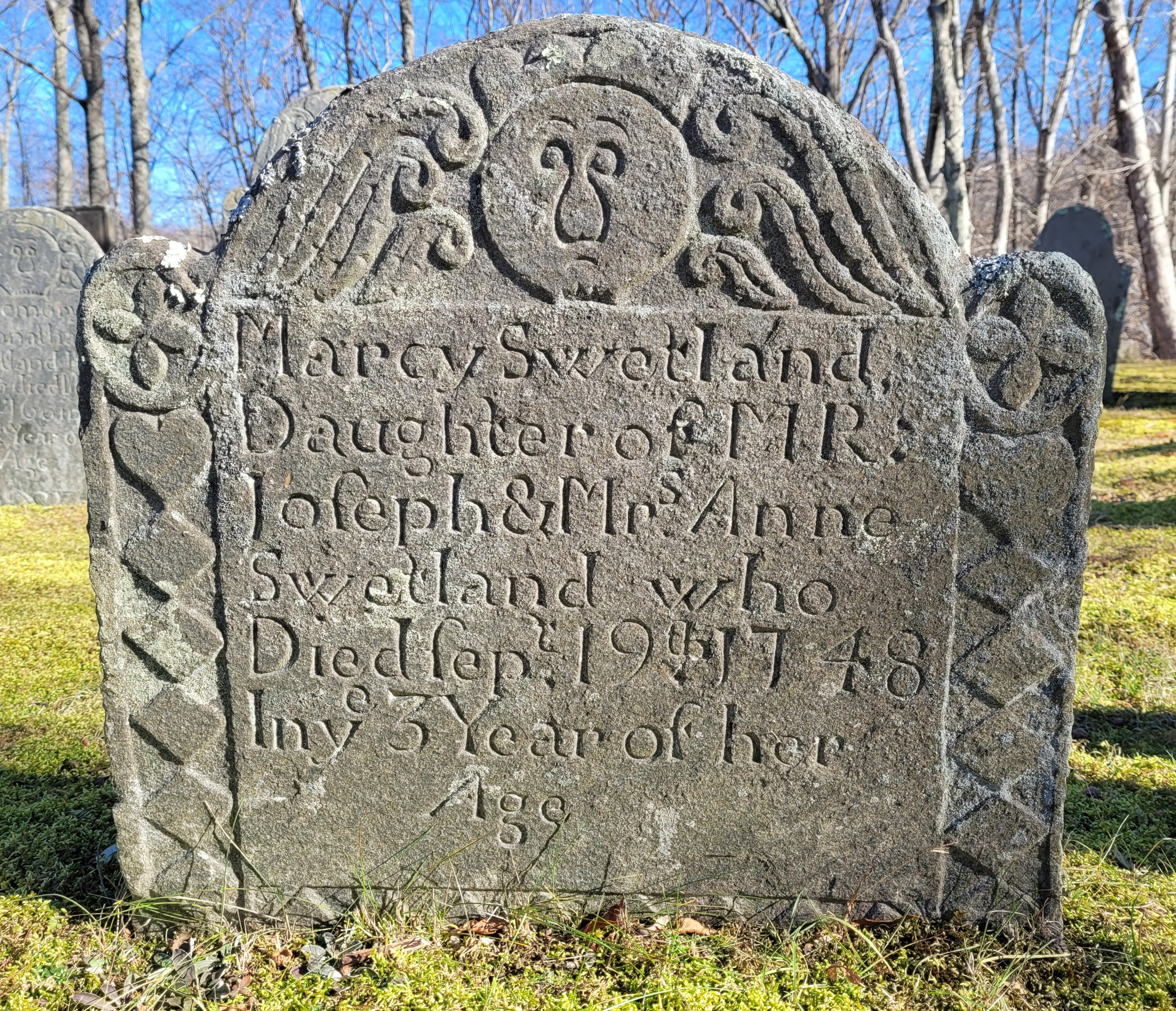
Schist marker featuring diamond and heart borders. Andover CT.

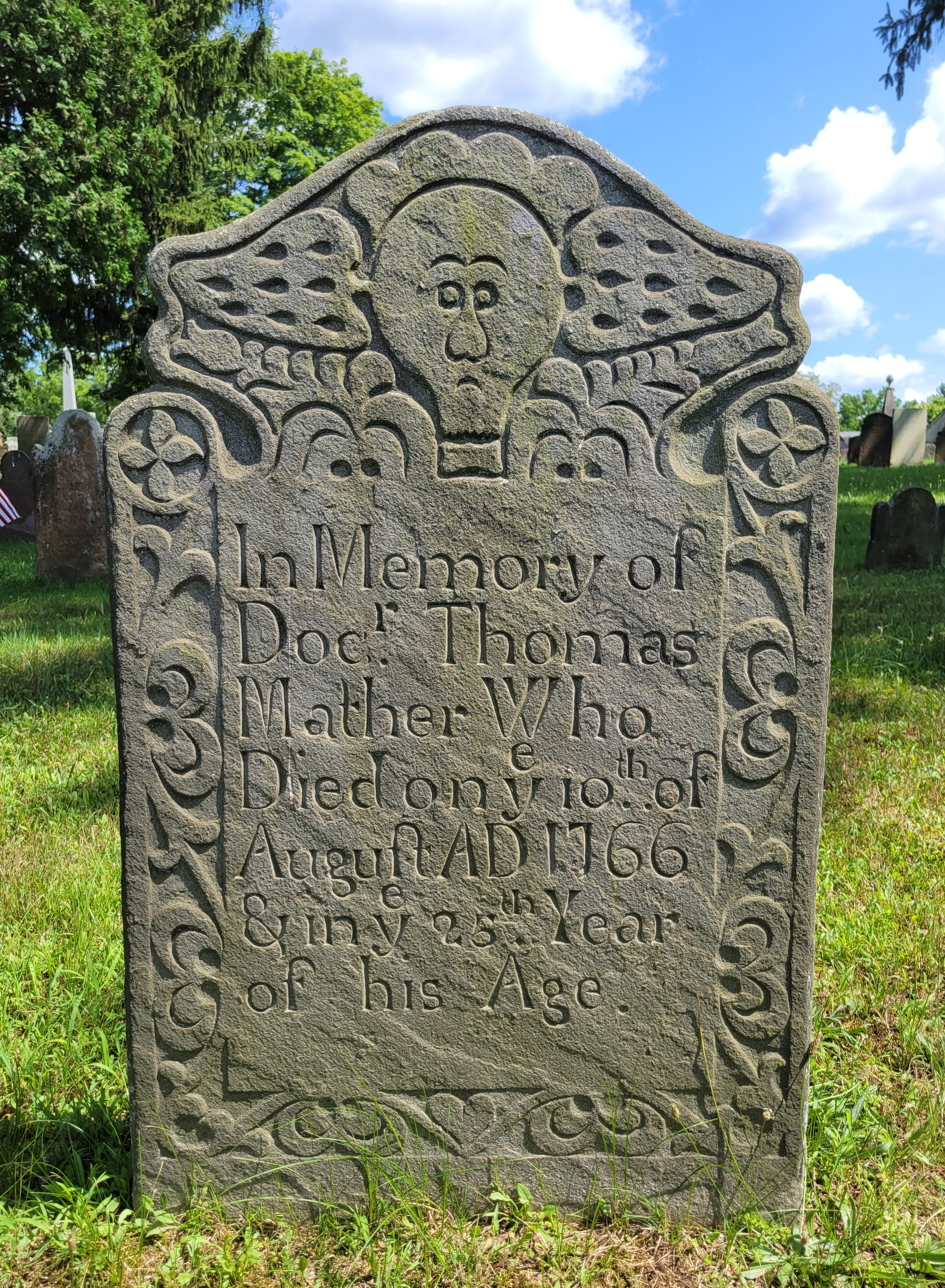
Elaborate gravestone in Farmington CT.

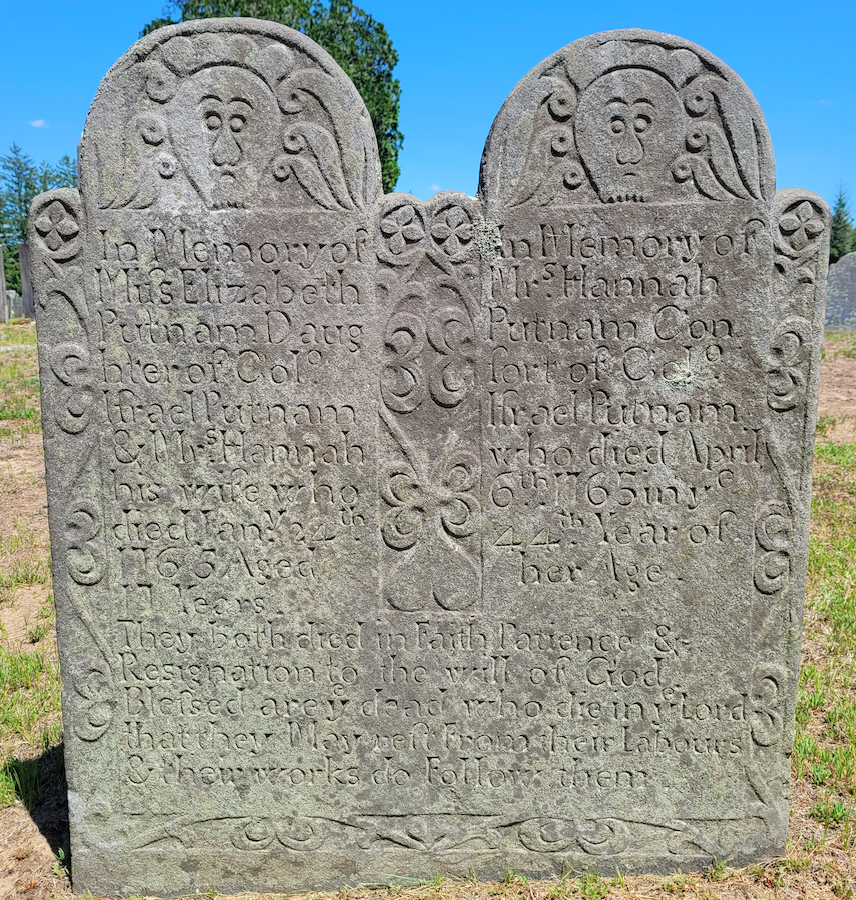
Double marker for the wife and daughter of Israel Putnam. South Cemetery in Brooklyn, CT.

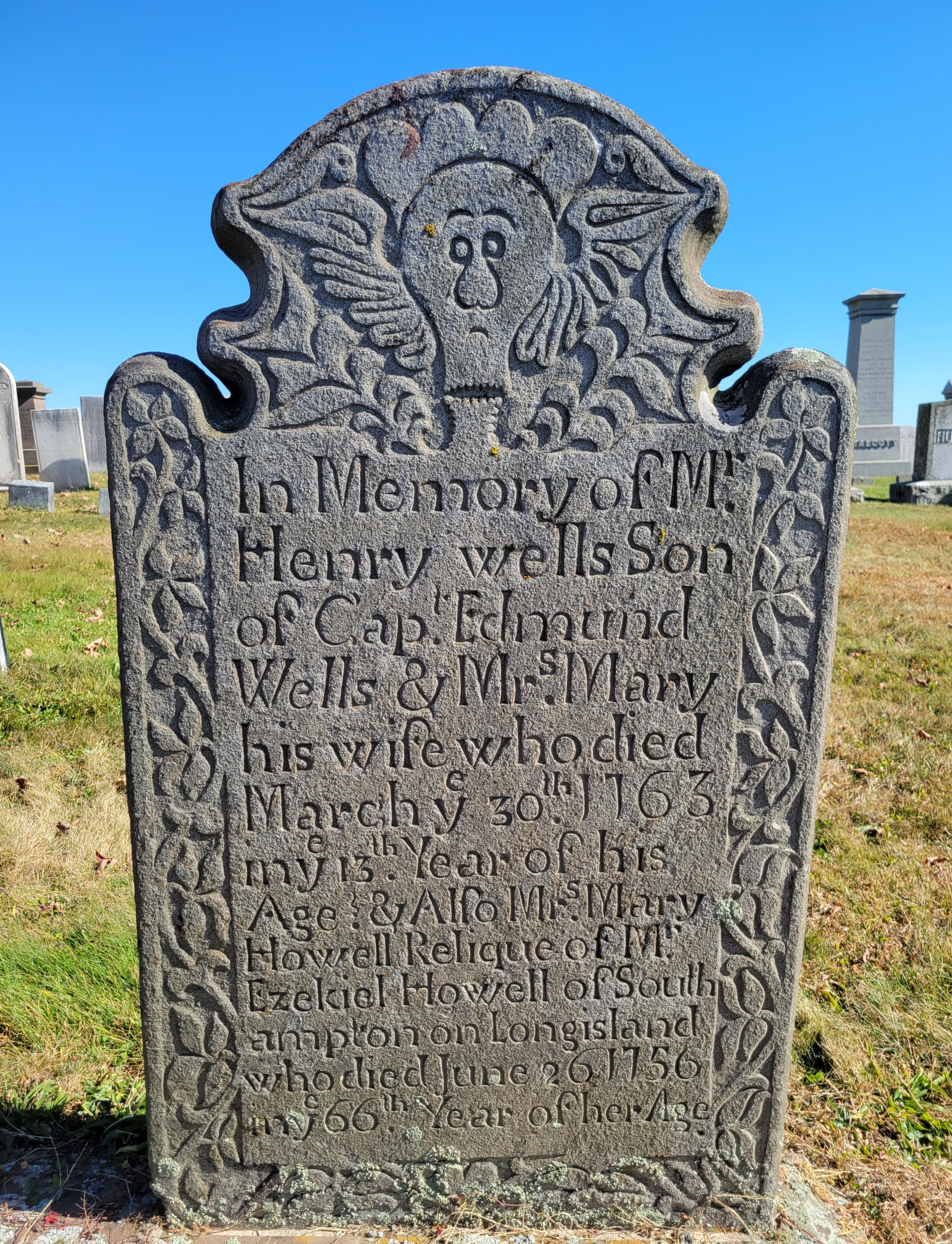
Rare feathered wing elaborate marker. Gillead Cemetery, Hebron, Connecticut.

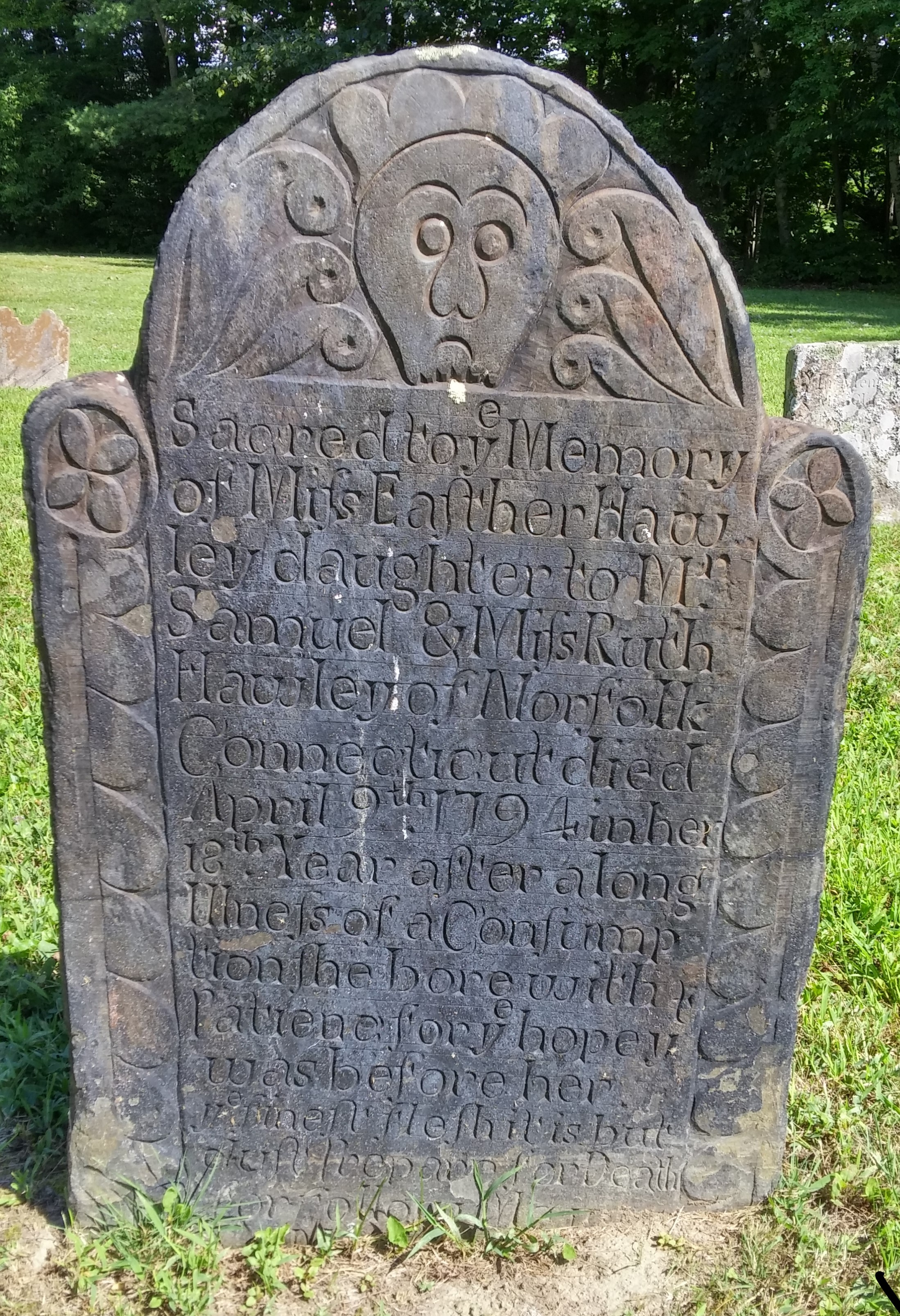
Example of a Vermont Slate stone carved by Bartlett, East Thetford, Vermont

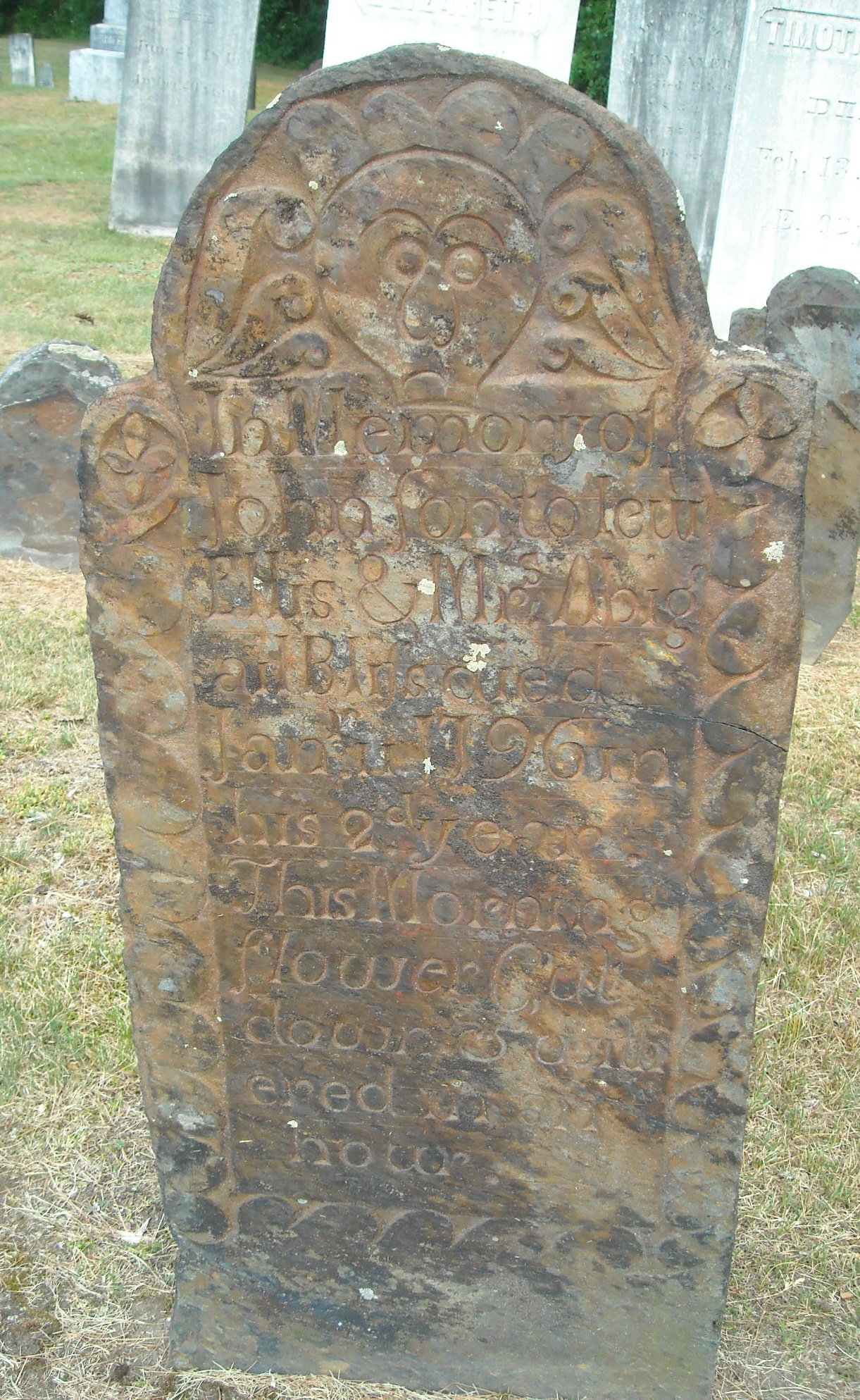
Gravestone carved by Bartlett dated 1796. Norwich, VT

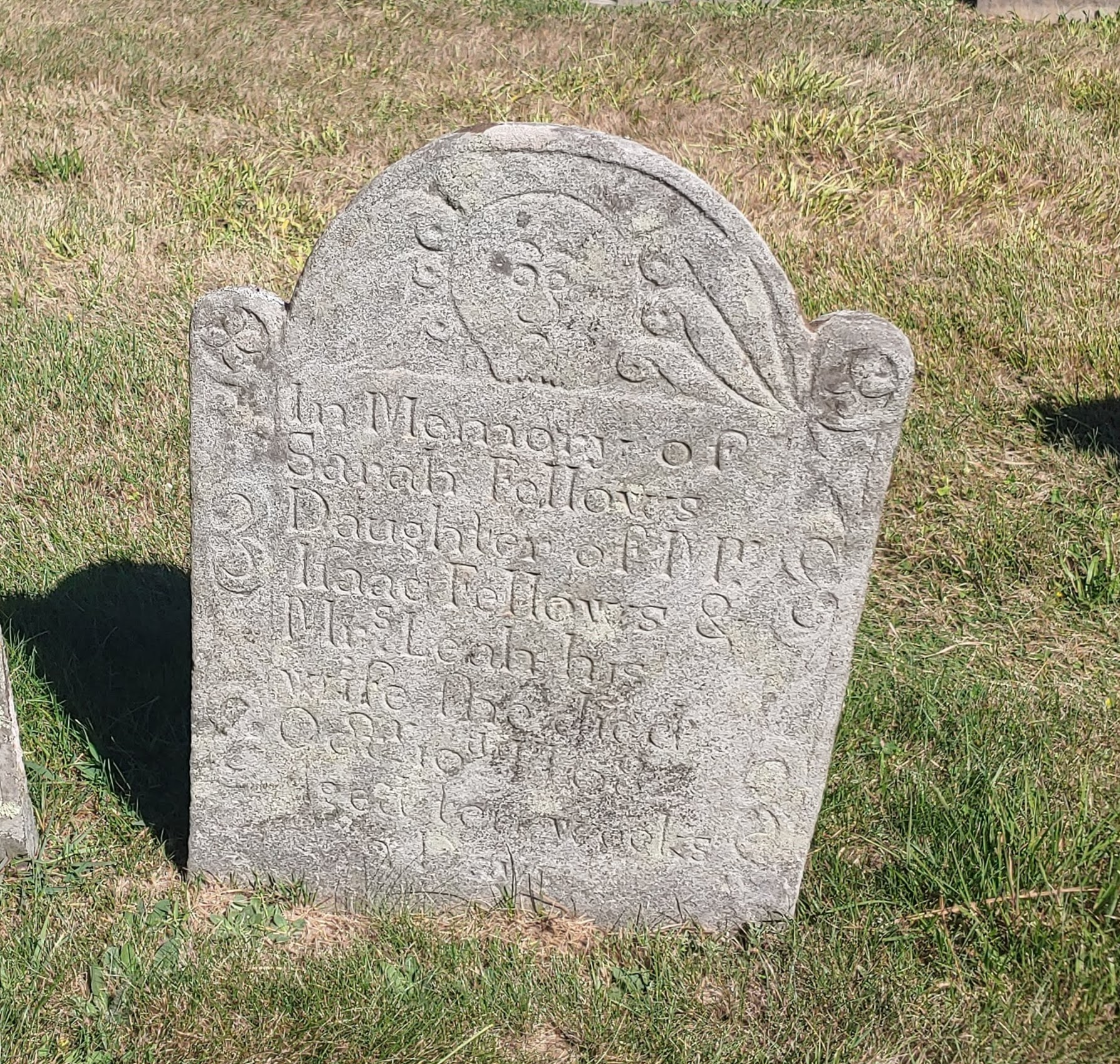
Tombstone carved by Gershom Bartlett in Woodstock, CT

== See also ==
- Funerary art in Puritan New England

== Sources ==
- Depold, Hans. Bolton (Images of America). Arcadia Publishing, 2011. ISBN 978-0-7385-7377-9
- Eriquez, Christina. Our History In Stone: The New England Cemetery Dictionary. Lulu, 2010
- Hosley, W. N. (1985). The Great River: Art & Society of the Connecticut Valley, 1635-1820 (1st ed.). Hartford CT: Wadsworth Atheneum.
- Caulfield, Earnest J. (1980). "Wanted: The Hook-And-Eye Man (Markers I)". Annual Journal of the Association for Gravestone Studies (1st ed.). Greenfield Mass: Association for Gravestone Studies.
- "GERSHOM BARTLETT (1723-1798)". Connecticut Gravestone Network.
- Slater, James A. (1987). The Colonial Burying Grounds of Connecticut and the Men Who Made Them (1st ed.). Hamden CT: Archon Books.
- Shapleigh-Brown, Ruth. "The Cemeteries of Hebron, Connecticut: Their Historic Monuments, Stone Carvers and Care". The Hebron Historic Properties Commission & The Hebron Historical Society, October 27, 2013
