= Hal Stalmaster =

American film and television actor

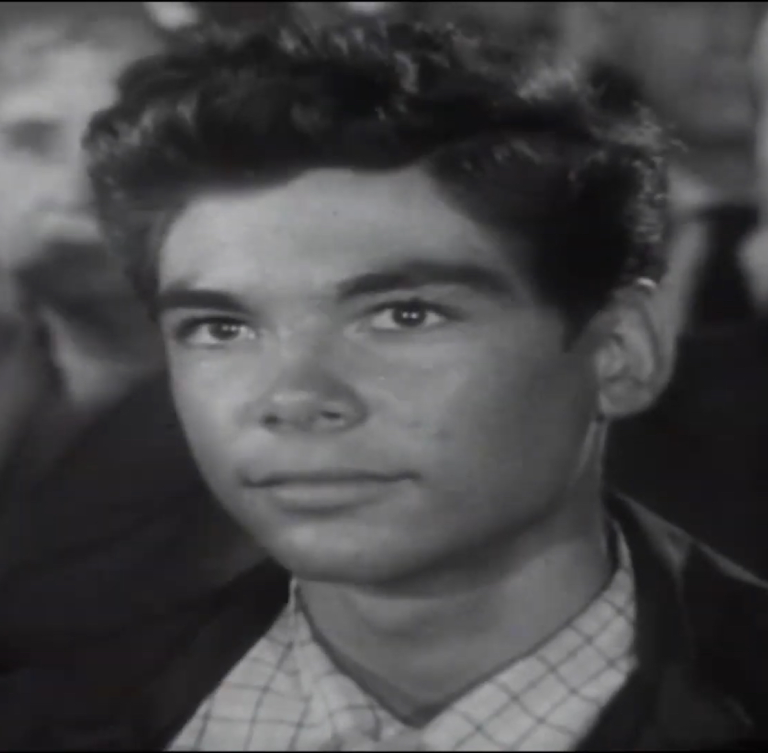
- Stalmaster in Cavalcade of America, 1957
- Born: Harry Lapidus Stalmaster; March 29, 1940 (age 86); Los Angeles, California, U.S.
- Education: University of California, Los Angeles
- Occupation: Television actor
- Years active: 1957–1966
- Relatives: Lynn Stalmaster (brother)

Harry Lapidus Stalmaster (born March 29, 1940) is an American film and television actor. He is best known for playing the title role in the film Johnny Tremain, based on the 1943 historical novel by Esther Forbes.

== Life and career ==
Stalmaster was born in Los Angeles, California. He was the brother of Lynn Stalmaster, a casting director. He attended Beverly Hills High School. He began his screen career in 1957, appearing in the anthology television series Cavalcade of America. In the same year, he starred in the title role of the film Johnny Tremain.

Later in his career, Stalmaster guest-starred in television programs including The Rebel and 12 O'Clock High, and attended the University of California, graduating in 1963.

Stalmer retired from acting in 1966, last appearing in the sitcom television series My Three Sons. After retiring from acting, he served as an army officer at the Presidio in San Francisco, California for two years. He worked as a booking agent.
