= Dora Nelson =

Dora Nelson may refer to:

- Dora Nelson (play), a play by the French writer Louis Verneuil
- Dora Nelson (1935 film), a French film directed by René Guissart
- Dora Nelson (1939 film), an Italian film directed by Mario Soldati
