= Come Summer =

Former Musical

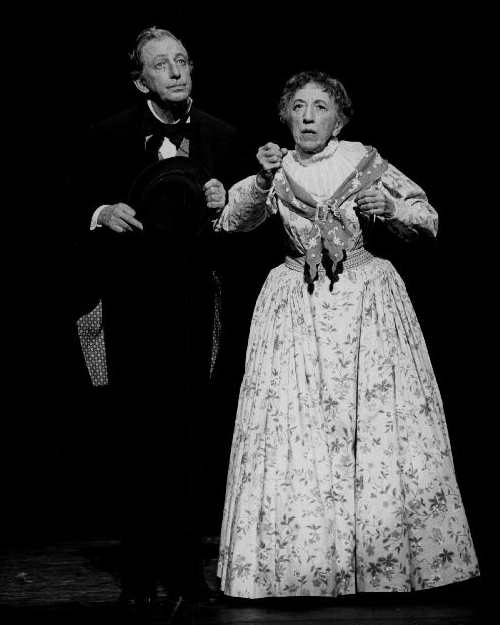
- Ray Bolger and Margaret Hamilton as Phineas Sharp and Dorinda Pratt, 1969
- Music: David Baker
- Lyrics: Will Holt
- Book: Will Holt
- Basis: Rainbow on the Road by Esther Forbes
- Productions: 1969 Broadway

Come Summer is a Broadway musical with a book and lyrics by Will Holt and music by David Baker, based on Rainbow on the Road by Esther Forbes and vocal arrangements by Trude Rittmann. The original Broadway production opened on March 18, 1969 at the Lunt-Fontanne Theatre starring, Ray Bolger, Leonard John Crofoot, David Cryer, Cathryn Damon, Margaret Hamilton, and Barbara Sharma. Directed by Agnes de Mille it closed after 7 performances on March 22, 1969. Despite its short run, David Cryer won the 1969 Theatre World Award.

The story tells of an itinerant peddlar in 19th century New England, and the people whose lives he affects.

Behind the scenes, the musical was a disaster. Ray Bolger demanded that the producers expand his role; several rewrites later, de Mille herself was fired and replaced by Burt Shevelove. Only a few days after that, Shevelove exited, and "the producers asked Agnes to come back, but only to choreograph." De Mille's assistant director, James Mitchell, turned down the director's chair, but became the de facto director anyway. As a result, "neither she [de Mille] nor anyone else could say who directed the show." Come Summer turned out to be de Mille's final Broadway production.

== Songs ==
Act I

- Good Time Charlie - Phineas and Peddlers
- Think Spring - Phineas, Jude, Mrs. Meserve, Sheriff and Populace
- Wild Birds Calling - Jude and Mitty
- Goodbye, My Bachelor - Phineas, Jude and Populace
- Fine, Thank You, Fine - Emma
- Road to Hampton - Jude
- Come Summer - Phineas, Jude, Mitty and Visions of Lovers
- Let Me Be - Mitty and Jude
- Feather in My Shoe - Phineas
- The Loggers' Song - Phineas, Jude, Loggers and Populace

Act II

- Faucett Falls Fancy - Phineas and Populace
- Rockin' - Emma and Jude
- Skin and Bones - Phineas
- Jude's Holler - Jude and Populace
- Moonglade - Phineas, Jude, Mitty, Emma, Dorinda and Populace
- Women - Mitty
- No - Phineas and Populace
- So Much World - Jude
