= Lynn Stalmaster =

American casting director (1927–2021)

- Born: November 17, 1927; Omaha, Nebraska, U.S.
- Died: February 12, 2021 (aged 93); Los Angeles, California, U.S.
- Education: MA, UCLA TFT 1952
- Occupation: Casting director
- Years active: 1950–2006
- Spouses: Gloria McGough (m. 1956, divorced) Shirley A. Alexander (m. 1962; div. 1972)
- Children: 2
- Awards: AMPAS Honorary 2016

Lynn Arlen Stalmaster (November 17, 1927 – February 12, 2021) was an American casting director. He was noted as the first casting director to be conferred an Academy Award, having received an Honorary Oscar in 2016.

== Early life ==
Stalmaster was born in Omaha, Nebraska, on November 17, 1927. He was the son of Estelle (Lapidus) and Irvin A. Stalmaster, a lawyer who became a judge. Irvin was the first Jew, as well as the youngest person, to be appointed to a Nebraska district judgeship. He was also active in the local Jewish community, serving as president of the Omaha B'nai B'rith. Lynn Stalmaster's younger brother is actor Hal Stalmaster (born 1940), best known for his starring role in the Disney film Johnny Tremain.

Stalmaster initially attended Dundee Elementary School in Omaha's Dundee–Happy Hollow Historic District. In order to ameliorate his severe asthma, his family later relocated to Beverly Hills, California, where he attended Beverly Hills High School. There he overcame his shyness by immersing himself in theatre and radio. After serving in the U.S. Army during World War II, he studied theater arts at the UCLA School of Theater, Film and Television, obtaining a Master of Arts in 1952.

== Career ==
Stalmaster got his first job in show business as an actor, appearing in the war movies The Steel Helmet (1951), The Flying Leathernecks (1951), and the TV series Big Town. As a fail-safe plan, he was employed by Grosse-Krasne as a production assistant. He subsequently became casting director after the incumbent retired, and went on to cast five on-air series.

After several years in that capacity, Stalmaster became an independent casting director. He established himself quickly as a solid casting director, finding steady work in both television and motion pictures. He was credited with casting more than 60 movies of the decade, among them; Fiddler on the Roof, Harold and Maude, The Cowboys, Deliverance, Rollerball, Silver Streak, Black Sunday, Coming Home, Convoy, The Rose, Superman and Being There.

Stalmaster was responsible for casting TV shows such as Gunsmoke, The Untouchables, and My Favorite Martian. He was also a part of Academy Award winning movies such as In the Heat of the Night, The Thomas Crown Affair, The Right Stuff, and Brian De Palma's The Untouchables.

Stalmaster was the first casting director to receive credit on a separate card in the main titles of a feature film, starting with The Thomas Crown Affair in 1968. His name subsequently appeared in the main titles of over 180 films, credited as "Casting by Lynn Stalmaster."

== Later life ==
Stalmaster was conferred the Career Achievement Award by the Casting Society of America (CSA) in 2003. Thirteen years later, in November 2016, he received an Academy Honorary Award from the Academy of Motion Picture Arts and Sciences. He was the first casting director to receive an Academy Award. Two years later, the Casting Society of America began honoring entertainment professionals with the Lynn Stalmaster Award for Career Achievement. Recipients include Annette Bening, Laura Dern, and Geena Davis.

Stalmaster died on the morning of February 12, 2021, at his home in Los Angeles. He was 93.

== Partial filmography ==
- Screaming Eagles, 1956
- The Invisible Boy, 1957
- Trooper Hook, 1957
- I Want to Live!, 1958
- Pork Chop Hill, 1959
- Inherit the Wind, 1960
- West Side Story, 1961
- Judgment at Nuremberg, 1961
- Two for the Seesaw, 1962
- A Child Is Waiting, 1963
- Toys in the Attic, 1963
- Lady in a Cage, 1964
- Kiss Me, Stupid, 1964
- The Greatest Story Ever Told, 1965
- The Hallelujah Trail, 1965
- A Rage to Live, 1965
- The Russians Are Coming, the Russians Are Coming, 1966
- The Fortune Cookie, 1966
- Return of the Seven, 1966
- Cast a Giant Shadow, 1966
- In the Heat of the Night, 1967
- Hour of the Gun, 1967
- Fitzwilly, 1967
- The Scalphunters, 1968
- The Thomas Crown Affair, 1968
- The Killing of Sister George, 1968
- The Stalking Moon, 1968
- Yours, Mine and Ours, 1968
- The Bridge at Remagen, 1969
- What Ever Happened to Aunt Alice?, 1969
- They Shoot Horses, Don't They?, 1969
- Viva Max, 1969
- Too Late the Hero, 1970
- They Call Me Mister Tibbs!, 1970
- Monte Walsh, 1970
- Lawman, 1971
- Valdez Is Coming, 1971
- The Grissom Gang, 1971
- Fiddler on the Roof, 1971
- Harold and Maude, 1971
- The Cowboys, 1972
- Pocket Money, 1972
- The Wrath of God, 1972
- Deliverance, 1972
- Junior Bonner, 1972
- Jeremiah Johnson, 1972
- The New Centurions, 1972
- The Mechanic, 1972
- The Life and Times of Judge Roy Bean, 1972
- Lolly-Madonna XXX, 1973
- Scorpio, 1973
- The Iceman Cometh, 1973
- The Last Detail, 1973
- Sleeper, 1973
- Cinderella Liberty, 1973
- Executive Action, 1973
- Rhinoceros, 1974
- Billy Two Hats, 1974
- Conrack, 1974
- Mandingo, 1975
- Rollerball, 1975
- Silver Streak, 1976
- Bound for Glory, 1976
- Black Sunday, 1977
- New York, New York, 1977
- The Other Side of Midnight, 1977
- Coming Home, 1978
- The Fury, 1978
- Foul Play, 1978
- Go Tell the Spartans, 1978
- Convoy, 1978
- Superman, 1978
- Being There, 1979
- Stir Crazy, 1980
- Caveman, 1981
- First Blood, 1982
- Tootsie, 1982
- Airplane II: The Sequel, 1982
- The Right Stuff, 1983
- Supergirl, 1984
- Jagged Edge, 1985
- Santa Claus: The Movie, 1985
- 9½ Weeks, 1986
- Spaceballs, 1987
- The Untouchables, 1987
- Weekend at Bernie's, 1989
- See No Evil, Hear No Evil, 1989
- Casualties of War, 1989
- Crazy People, 1990
- Teenage Mutant Ninja Turtles II: The Secret of the Ooze, 1991
- Stay Tuned, 1992
- Clifford, 1994
- To Gillian on Her 37th Birthday, 1996
- Battlefield Earth, 2000
