= Micheline Cheirel =

French actress (1917–2002)

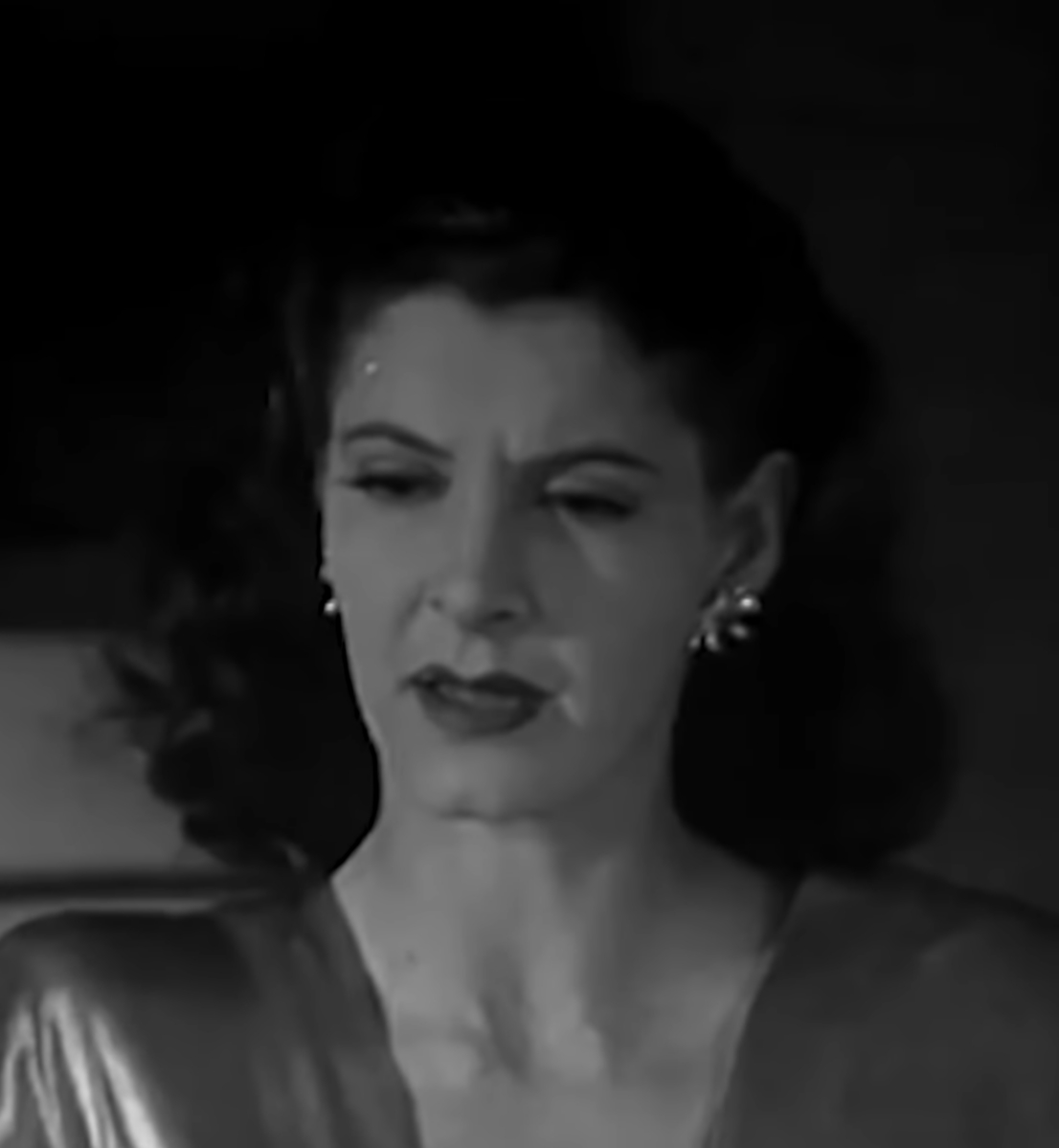
- Cheirel in Flight to Nowhere (1946)
- Born: Micheline Truyen; 13 April 1917; Paris, France
- Died: 25 October 2002 (aged 85); Antibes, France
- Occupation: Actress
- Years active: 1934–1947
- Spouses: John Loder (m. 1936; div. 1941) Paul Meurisse (m. 1951; div. 1955)
- Children: 1

Micheline Cheirel (born Micheline Truyen; 12 April 1917 – 25 October 2002) was a 20th-century French actress, active from 1934 to 1947. She was the niece of the actress Jeanne Cheirel.

== Personal life ==
She married British actor John Loder as his second wife. They were married from 1936 until their divorce in 1941. They had one daughter together.

Cheirel appeared in some films made in the United States. In 1951 she married French actor Paul Meurisse. Their union ended in divorce.

== Filmography ==
- Marius et Olive à Paris by Jean Epstein : Alberte (1935)
- Dora Nelson by René Guissart : Yvonne de Moreuil (1935)
- Carnival in Flanders (La Kermesse héroïque) by Jacques Feyder : Siska (1935)
- La belle équipe by Julien Duvivier : Huguette, Mario's fiancée (1936)
- Tarass Boulba by Alexis Granowsky (1936)
- The Ladies in the Green Hats by Maurice Cloche : Arlette (1937)
- Rendez-vous Champs-Elysées by Jacques Houssin : Liliane (1937)
- Feux de joie by Jacques Houssin : Micheline (1938)
- Hold Back the Dawn by Mitchell Leisen (1941)
- A Close Call for Ellery Queen by James P. Hogan : Marie Dubois (1942)
- I Married an Angel by W.S. Van Dyke : Annette (1942)
- Cornered by Edward Dmytryk : Madeleine Jarnac (1945)
- Devotion by Curtis Bernhardt : Mlle Blanche (1946)
- So Dark the Night by Joseph H. Lewis : Nanette Michaud (1946)
- Flight to Nowhere by William Rowland : Countess Maria de Fresca (1946)
- Jewels of Brandenburg by Eugene Forde : Claudette Grandet (1947)
- The Crime Doctor's Gamble by William Castle : Mignon Duval-Jardin (1947)

== Stage productions ==
- Rope by Patrick Hamilton, directed by Jean Darcante, Théâtre de la Renaissance (1954)

== Vocal dubbing ==
- A Bullet for Joey : Yvonne Temblay (Toni Gerry) (1955)
