= Claire Adams (disambiguation) =

Claire Adams (1898–1978) was a Canadian actress.

Claire Adams may also refer to:

- Claire Adams (British actress), see List of EastEnders characters (2007)
- Claire Adams, musician (Gravenhurst (band))
- Claire Adams, character in Women in the Night
