= Allan Ludwig =

American photographer (1933–2025)

Allan Ira Ludwig
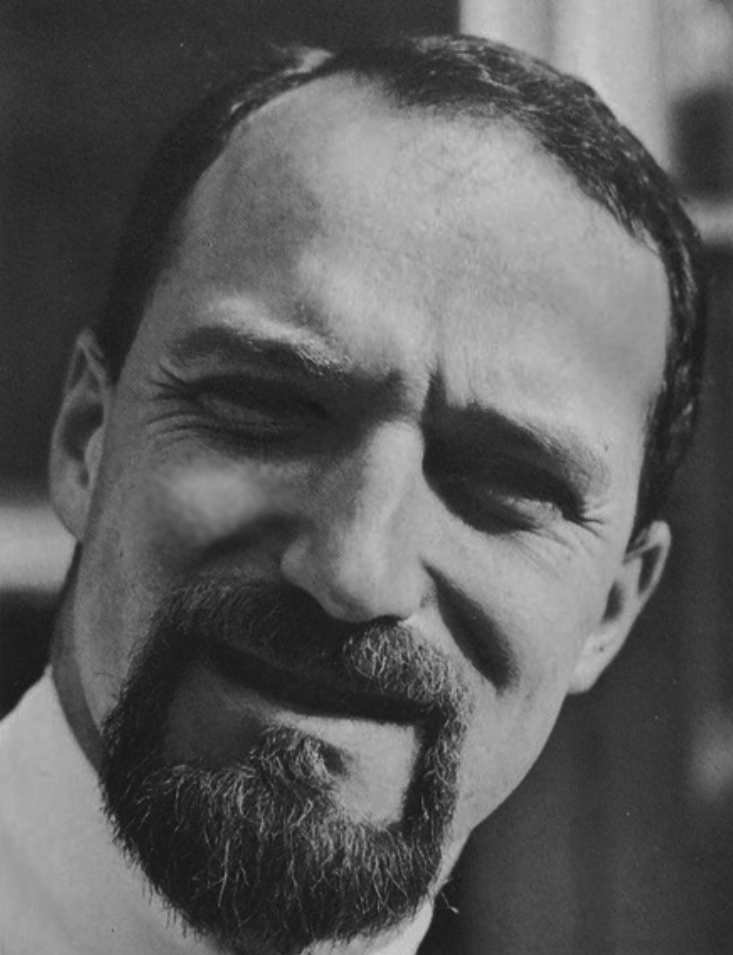
- Ludwig c. 1967
- Born: Allan Ira Ludwig; June 9, 1933; Yonkers, New York, US
- Died: November 2, 2025 (aged 92); New York City, US
- Other name: Elisha Cook Jr. (Note: an occasional pseudonym)
- Education: BFA 1956; MA 1961; PhD 1964
- Alma mater: Yale University
- Occupations: Photographer; art historian
- Spouses: Janine Lowell (m. 1956, divorced); Gwen Akin (m. 1992)
- Children: 5

Allan Ira Ludwig (June 9, 1933 – November 2, 2025) was an American art historian and photographer. His book Graven Images, an influential study in the field of American Studies, played a role in the rise of interest in Puritan-era gravestone studies starting in the 1960s. He was also a notable fine arts photographer whose work has been exhibited and collected in the U.S. and abroad. Ludwig sometimes used the pseudonym Elisha Cook Jr. when documenting graffiti and street art.

== Early life and education ==
Ludwig was born on June 9, 1933, in Yonkers, New York, to Saul Ludwig and Honey (née Fuchs) Ludwig. His father was a textile manufacturer and his mother was a homemaker. After being introduced to the arts by his mother, he began drawing as a child. When he was 13 years old, he was taught to use a camera by a neighbor.

Ludwig earned his BFA in 1956 from Yale University, followed by an MA in 1961 and a PhD in 1964, both in Art History also from Yale. His dissertation research was supported by a three-year fellowship from the Bollingen Foundation.

== Early career ==
With the publication of Graven Images in 1966, Ludwig is credited with establishing the scholarly study of Puritan gravestones as a distinct field within American art history; The New York Times has called him the "Founding Father" of Gravestone Studies. The book builds on the work of Harriette Merrifield Forbes, an early pioneer in the study New England gravestones, who has been referred to as the "Founding Mother" of gravestone studies. Ludwig's book contributed the new and original line of reasoning that New England settlers employed a rich vocabulary of religious imagery in their funerary art, challenging earlier historical assumptions that the expression of Puritan theology was strictly iconophobic. Documenting this visual vernacular with over 250 black-and-white images by Ludwig using a large-format camera, the work received broad critical acclaim and was nominated for a Pulitzer Prize. Critic Greil Marcus described the book as "an extraordinary work". Marcus thought that "its academic trappings should not discourage anyone looking for a revelation about the resources, strength, and complexity of American culture". Caroline Robbins wrote that the book "obliges scholars...to reassess much of their thinking" about the period, and Ronald Edwards described it as "a fine and scholarly work" with "superb" photography. In 1981 Ludwig received the Forbes award from the Association for Gravestone Studies (AGS).

In the 1960s, supported by a fellowship from the American Council of Learned Societies, Ludwig also produced a series of photographs shot in Rome of Renaissance tombs of curial figures in the papal court. In the 1990s, he collaborated with Gwen Akin on a series of photographs, meditating on the theme of the grotesque, shot at the Mütter Museum, part of the College of Physicians of Philadelphia. Their collaborative work was included in the Beyond Ars Medica exhibition at Thread Waxing Space in New York City.

Ludwig's teaching career began after receiving his B.F.A. and before his graduate work when he took up a position as an instructor of photography at the Rhode Island School of Design. After receipt of his Ph.D. he became a professor of art history at Dickinson College in Carlisle, Pennsylvania and later at Syracuse University and at Bloomfield College.

== Later career ==
Ludwig returned full time to photography in the 1970s and 80s, creating such series as "Reflections out of Time," "Graffiti," and "Base Metals," shown in solo and group exhibitions across the US and abroad. Beginning in the 1980s his collaboration with Gwen Akin resulted in the photographic partnership of Akin-Ludwig. With Akin, he worked in the platinum-palladium medium, exploring the theme of the grotesque and the aesthetic created as the subjects of the photographs contrasted with the beauty of the printing process. Together they also created "The Large Cibachrome Landscapes and Seascapes Series" and "The Women Series," also in platinum-palladium. His long-standing interest in valorizing vernacular vocabularies of art moved him to become an early follower and documentarian of street art and graffiti as art forms of the people, especially as it was developing in his downtown NYC neighborhood.

Later in life, he photographed street art and graffiti, which he admired as an international art movement that he compared to pop art. These photographs were sometimes created under the pseudonym Elisha Cook, Jr.

== Personal life and death ==
In 1955, Ludwig married Janine A. Lowell (d. 2012), a writer and artist, whom he met a Yale. They had three children together. He married his second wife, Gwen Akin, fellow photographer, in 1992, with whom he collaborated on a series of projects. Together, they had two children. Ludwig died on November 2, 2025, at the age of 92 in Manhattan.

== Collections ==
The collection of Ludwig's photographs of Renaissance tomb sculpture shot in Rome is held in digital form in The American Academy in Rome Digital Archive. The Yale Arts Library holds a collection of 150 of his photographs in the Allan Ludwig Photograph Collection of New England Gravestones. The Robert S. Cox Special Collections & University Archives Research Center at the University of Massachusetts Amherst holds hundreds of his photographs in their Association for Gravestone Studies Collection.

In Washington, D.C., the National Gallery of Art houses 357 works in his photographic series "Photographic and historical study of New England gravestone carving from 1653 to 1810". The Archives of American Art at the Smithsonian Institution holds "The graven images of New England : 1653–1800 by Allen [sic] Ludwig, [ca.1960]", consisting of approximately 500 photographs, in their permanent collection.

The Boston Athenæum holds a collection of 498 of his photographs.

The Metropolitan Museum of Art, the Chrysler Museum, and other institutions have also shown or collected the photographs of Allan Ludwig and Akin-Ludwig.

== Books ==
- Graven Images: New England Stonecarving and Its Symbols, 1650–1815 (1966, ISBN 9780608187693)
- Reflections Out of Time: A Portfolio of Photographs (1981)
- Repulsion: Aesthetics of the Grotesque (1986, ISBN 9780932075123)
