= Rainbow on the Road =

Book by Esther Forbes

- Author: Esther Forbes
- Language: English
- Publisher: Houghton Mifflin
- Publication date: 1954
- OCLC: 284203
- LC Class: PZ3.F7418 Rai

Rainbow on the Road is a 1954 novel by Esther Forbes, in which a peddler-artist named Jude spends his winters painting the figures of men and women on canvases, while leaving the faces blank. When spring comes, he travels by cart to various New England towns, charging people $3 to $5 to have the blank faces filled in with their likenesses.

The simple plot is essentially a series of vignettes. Jude saves a young woman from making a disastrous marriage to an older man by creating a portrait as if she had drowned herself — as did the old man's previous wife. Jude flirts with a sexy tavern mistress whose face just happens to fit the Rubens-style nude painting that he seldom shows to anyone. The most dramatic moment occurs when a sheriff mistakenly arrests him in the mistaken belief that he is an infamous highwayman.

Rainbow on the Road's chief rewards are in the portrayal of local types and their colorful phrases ("She was plump as a little pig. active as sin, awkward as a calf, and not much more legs on her than a pigeon"). The evocations of New England during the four seasons are memorable, as in the book's late-autumn ending: "Crows were out gleaning, looking like blown bits of charred paper. And talking all the time — like crows talk. Far above, the lonely hawk floating. Harvest is over. It is the lone-somest time of the year."

The novel (published by Houghton Mifflin, and now out of print) forms the basis of the 1969 Broadway musical, Come Summer.
