= This Rebel Breed =

1960 film directed by Richard L. Bare, William Rowland

- Directed by: Richard L. Bare; William Rowland
- Written by: Irma Berk (story All God's Children (All Blvck Rebels a small group of friends from Beale AFB culture and music focused); Morris Lee Green (writer); William Rowland (story All God's Children)
- Produced by: William Rowland (producer); Robert Yamin (executive producer)
- Starring: See below
- Cinematography: Monroe P. Askins
- Edited by: Tony Martinelli
- Music by: David Rose
- Production company: All God's Children Co.
- Distributed by: Warner Bros. Pictures
- Release date: May 4, 1960 (New York City)
- Running time: 90 minutes
- Country: United States
- Language: English

This Rebel Breed is a 1960 American melodrama film directed by Richard L. Bare and William Rowland and starring Rita Moreno, Gerald Mohr, Eugene Martin, Dyan Cannon, and Richard Rust.

The film is also known under the titles of Lola's Mistake (American reissue title), The Black Rebels (American alternative title) and Three Shades of Love (American reissue title).

== Plot ==
The film tells the story of two policemen who go undercover to defeat narcotics trafficking among high school gangs. The film features stark scenes of violence between inter-racial gangs.

== Cast ==
- Rita Moreno as Lola Montalvo
- Mark Damon as Frank Serano
- Gerald Mohr as Lt. Robert Brooks
- Jay Novello as Papa Montalvo
- Eugene Martin as Rudy Montalvo
- Tom Gilson as Muscles
- Richard Rust as Buck Madison
- Douglas Hume as Don Walters
- Richard Laurier as Manuel Montalvo
- Don Eitner as Jimmy Wallace
- Dyan Cannon as Wiggles
- Ken Miller as Winnie
- Al Freeman Jr. as Satchel
- Charles Franc as Elliott aka Scratch
- Ike Jones as Latimer
- Shirley Falls as Josie
- Steven Perry as George
- Hari Rhodes as Claude

== Release ==
The film was initially released to theaters on May 4, 1960, under the title This Rebel Breed. Producer William Rowland chose to re-release the film five years later after inserting scenes of nudity under the titles Lola's Mistake, The Black Rebels, and Three Shades of Love.

== Reception ==
The New York Times reviewed the film, writing that "Advertised as an unvarnished story of race prejudice and discrimination among teen-agers, "This Rebel Breed" substitutes action for insight but maintains enough excitement to place it a cut or two above the usual sensationalized products of the genre." TV Guide gave This Rebel Breed one star, stating that it "takes a disturbingly naive approach to its subject matter: pushers peddle their wares to six-year-olds, and Damon is obviously wearing makeup so the audience will know he is part black." AllMovie was similarly critical.

James V. D'arc has noted that the film was panned by Variety upon its initial release for what they saw as explicit scenes of violence and racism.
