= The Wild Scene =

1970 film

- Directed by: William Rowland
- Written by: Samuel J. Jacoby (story); Michael Kraike
- Starring: Alberta Nelson
- Music by: Jaime Mendoza-Nava
- Release date: March 1970
- Running time: 96 minutes
- Country: United States
- Language: English

The Wild Scene is a 1970 American drama film directed by William Rowland and starring Alberta Nelson as Dr. Virginia Grant, a female psychiatrist who talks graphically about her tawdriest cases. When she goes underground to investigate her college daughter's sordid activities, she gets drawn into a world of prostitution, orgies, drugs, and more.

== Cast ==
- Alberta Nelson as Dr. Virginia Grant
- Rita Lupino as Faith
- Wendy Stuart as Andrea
- Jarl Victor as Dr. Jennings
- John Craven as Morton
- Berry Kroeger as Tim
- Nancy Czar as Clarette

== See also ==
- List of American films of 1970
