= John Craven (actor) =

American actor (1916–1995)

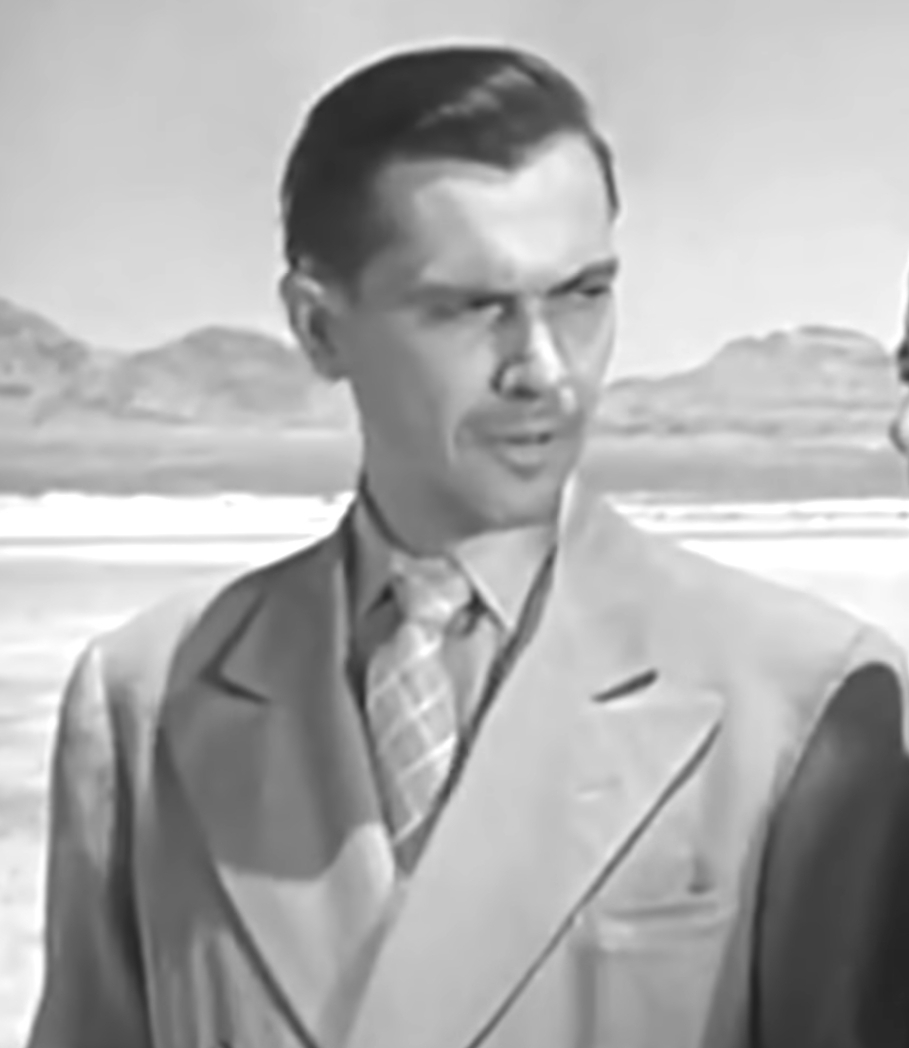
- Craven in Flight to Nowhere (1946)
- Born: June 22, 1916; New York City, U.S.
- Died: November 24, 1995 (aged 79); Salt Point, New York, U.S.
- Occupation: Actor
- Years active: 1937–1970
- Father: Frank Craven

John Craven (June 22, 1916 – November 24, 1995) was an American actor in theater, film, and television.

== Biography ==
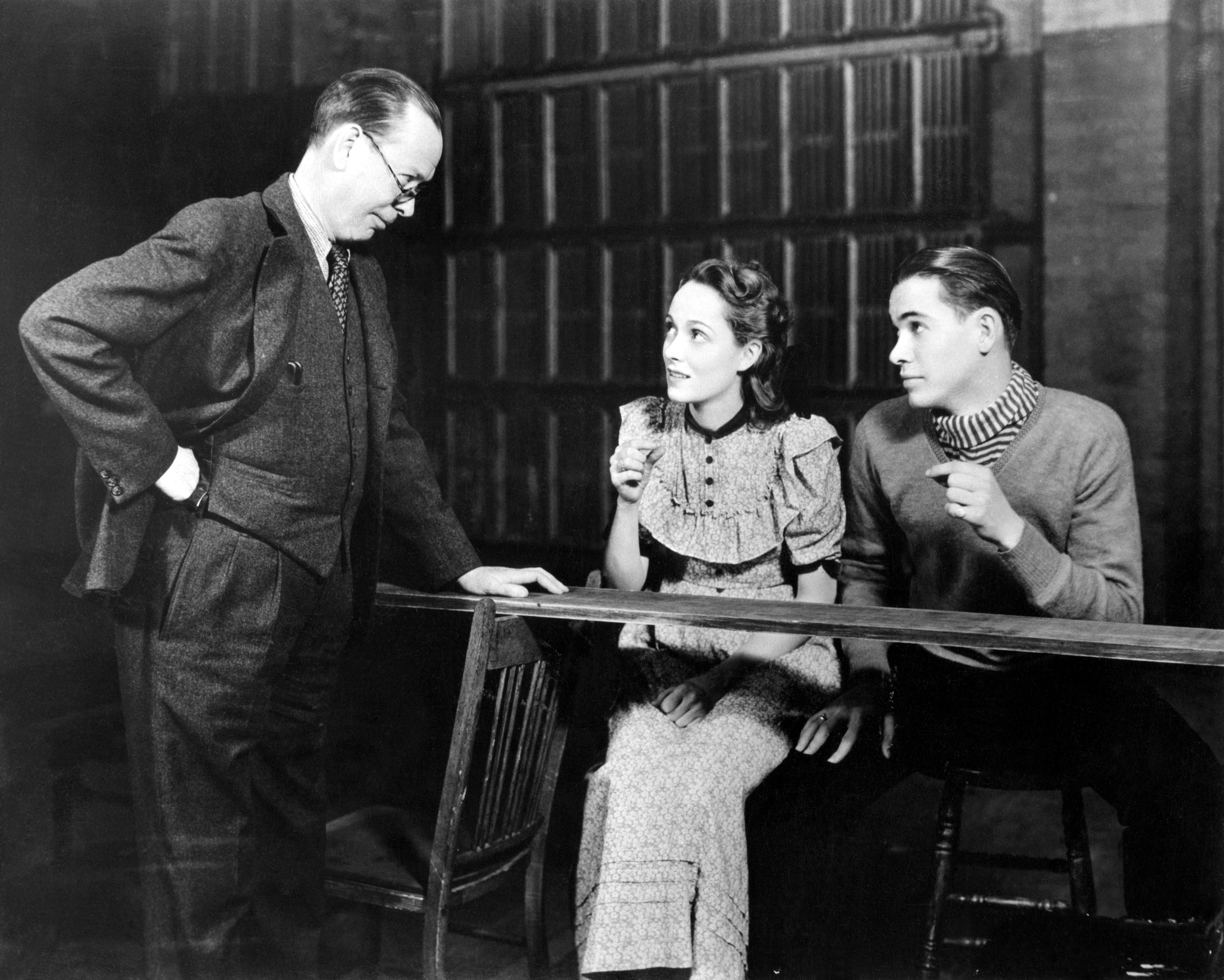
Frank Craven, Martha Scott and John Craven in the original Broadway production of Our Town (1938)

Craven was born on June 22, 1916, in New York City. He was a third-generation actor, following in the profession of his father, Frank Craven, and his grandfather, John T. Craven. His mother, Mary Blythe, was an actress prior to marriage. He had an older sister, Blyth Daly (1901-1965), born when the family lived in England. His baby picture was printed in the March, 1922 edition of Success magazine in an article about his father's career. He attended Beverly Hills High School in 1935.

Craven began on Broadway as assistant stage manager for Babes in Arms in 1937. Then he returned to Beverly Hills, starring in "The Thirteenth Chair" and Noël Coward's "Hay Fever" at Harold Lloyd's Beverly Hills Little Theatre for Professionals. He was originally slated to play a townsperson in the original stage version of Our Town at the Morosco Theatre, in which his father played the stage manager. After director Jed Harris heard him read, however, he gave him the juvenile leading role of George. Craven was overlooked in the movie version, however, with the part going to the then-unknown William Holden. He married actress Evelyn R. Barrows in New York on September 16, 1938, when they were both 22. He later married Dorothy Langan in the 1950s, and they had a son, Frank Craven, in 1955, thus continuing a pattern of alternating generations of men named Frank and John. Craven registered for the draft in WWII on October 16, 1940. He was stationed in Naples, Italy during World War II as a private, and put on shows for the USO. On his WWII draft card he listed his employer as the Henry Miller Theater, which today is the Stephen Sondheim Theater.

On November 24, 1995, Craven died at his home in Salt Point, New York.

== Broadway (selected) ==
Year	Title	Role
1937	Babes in Arms	Assistant stage manager (non-acting)
1938	Our Town	George Gibbs
1939	Aries is Rising	Roland Harris
1939	Happiest Days	Jeff
1940	Delicate Story	Oliver Odry
1940	Two on an Island	John Thompson
1941	Spring Again	Tom Cornish
1941	Village Green	Jeremiah Bentham
1949	They Knew What They Wanted	The R. F. D.

== Filmography (selected) ==
Year	Title	Role	Notes
1937	Over the Goal	King	
1943	The Human Comedy	Tobey George	
1943	Dr. Gillespie's Criminal Case	Roy Todwell	
1943	Someone to Remember	Dan Freeman	
1943	For God and Country	Danny Brewer	Short
1944	The Purple Heart	Sergeant Martin Stoner	
1944	Meet the People	John Swanson	
1944	In the Meantime, Darling	Sleeping Soldier	Uncredited
1946	Flight to Nowhere	Claude Forrest	
1946	Swell Guy	Mike O'Connor	
1953	Count the Hours!	George Braden	
1954	Security Risk	Dr. Lanson	
1955	The Green Mountain Boys	Remember Baker	TV movie
1956	Battle Stations	Commander James Matthews	
1956	Navy Wife	Dr. Carter	
1956	Hold Back the Night	Major Bob MacKay	
1956	Friendly Persuasion	Band Leader	Uncredited
1958	Revolt in the Big House	Guard	Uncredited
1960	Ocean's 11	Cashier	Uncredited
1960	Let's Make Love	Comstock	Uncredited
1964	The Brass Bottle	2nd Psychiatrist	Uncredited
1970	The Wild Scene	Morton	

== Television (selected) ==
Year	Title	Role	Notes
1952	The Egg and I	Jim	3 episodes
1954	Public Defender	Selway	Season 1 Episode 11: "Pauper's Gold"
1956	The Life and Legend of Wyatt Earp	Harry Drew / Dolan	Season 1 Episode 28: "One of Jesse's Gang"
1959	One Step Beyond	Harry Teller	Season 1 Episode 2: "Night of April 14"
1960	Alfred Hitchcock Presents	Older Clete Vine	Season 5 Episode 20: "The Day of the Bullet"
1960	Alfred Hitchcock Presents	Herbert Gold	Season 6 Episode 4: "The Contest for Aaron Gold"
1960	Wanted Dead or Alive	Zack Dawson	Season 3 Episode 9 "Criss-Cross"
1961	Alfred Hitchcock Presents	Tommy	Season 6 Episode 17: "The Last Escape"
1963	The Twilight Zone	Townsman	Season 5 Episode 7: "The Old Man in the Cave"
