= The Ladies in the Green Hats (1937 film) =

- Directed by: Maurice Cloche
- Written by: Germaine Acremant (novel); Maurice Cloche; Albert Acremant
- Produced by: Raymond Borderie
- Starring: Marguerite Moreno; Alice Tissot; Micheline Cheirel
- Cinematography: René Colas
- Music by: Germaine Tailleferre
- Production company: Compagnie Industrielle et Commerciale Cinématographique
- Release date: 15 December 1937
- Running time: 109 minutes
- Country: France
- Language: French

The Ladies in the Green Hats (French: Ces dames aux chapeaux verts) is a 1937 French comedy drama film directed by Maurice Cloche and starring Marguerite Moreno, Alice Tissot and Micheline Cheirel.

== Cast ==
- Marguerite Moreno as Telcide
- Alice Tissot as Marie
- Micheline Cheirel as Arlette
- Mady Berry as Ernestine
- Pierre Larquey as Ulysse Hyacinthe
- Gilbert Landry as Jacques de Fleurville
- Pierre Magnier as M. de Fleurville
- André Numès Fils as Emile Dutoit
- Georges Mauloy as Le grand Doyen
- Nicolas Amato
- Marcelle Barry as Jeanne
- Jacques Beauvais as Le livreur
- Félix Claude
- Nicole Ferrier as Jessy
- Gabrielle Fontan as Rosalie
- Anthony Gildès as Le commissaire
- Vyola Vareyne as Noémi

== Bibliography ==
- Goble, Alan. The Complete Index to Literary Sources in Film. Walter de Gruyter, 1999.
