= Johnny Tremain (film) =

1957 film

- Theatrical release poster
- Directed by: Robert Stevenson
- Screenplay by: Tom Blackburn
- Based on: Johnny Tremain by Esther Forbes
- Produced by: Walt Disney
- Starring: Hal Stalmaster; Luana Patten; Jeff York; Sebastian Cabot
- Cinematography: Charles P. Boyle
- Edited by: Stanley E. Johnson
- Music by: George Bruns
- Production company: Walt Disney Productions
- Distributed by: Buena Vista Distribution
- Release date: June 19, 1957
- Running time: 80 minutes
- Country: United States
- Language: English
- Budget: $700,000

Johnny Tremain is a 1957 American adventure war film made by Walt Disney Productions, released by Buena Vista Distribution, and based on the 1944 Newbery Medal-winning children's novel of the same name by Esther Forbes, retelling the story of the years in Boston, Massachusetts prior to the outbreak of the American Revolution. Johnny Tremain was the first Disney live-action film to be directed by Robert Stevenson. It was made for television but was first released in theatres. Walt Disney understood the new technology of color television and filmed his Walt Disney anthology television series in color, but the show, known as Disneyland at that time, was broadcast in black and white. After its theater run in 1957, the film was shown in its entirety on television in two episodes (subsequently known as Walt Disney Presents), rather than as a complete film on a single evening, on November 21 and December 5, 1958.

The film stars Hal Stalmaster, Luana Patten, Jeff York, Sebastian Cabot (in his second film role for Disney), Richard Beymer, Walter Coy and Ralph Clanton.

== Plot ==
In 1770s Boston, Johnny Tremain is apprenticed to a silversmith, Mr. Lapham. One day, wealthy Jonathan Lyte asks Mr. Lapham to make a sugar basin to match his grand silverware set. Lapham refuses because he believes he is too old for such jobs. Tremain believes he is skilled enough to do the job, and accepts. After trying several times but failing, he asks fellow silversmith, Paul Revere, for help designing a new handle. Revere tells him to make the handle deeper and larger. Eager to try the new design, Johnny breaks the Sabbath and accidentally burns his hand. The damage is so severe that he will never have full use of the hand again, and cannot continue as a silversmith apprentice. No one will hire him with only one usable hand. The Sons of Liberty recruited him as a messenger, to secretly inform members of the times and locations of meetings.

Johnny tells Priscilla Lapham, Mr. Lapham's granddaughter, that he is secretly related to Mr. Lyte. He shows her a christening cup bearing the Lyte family crest as evidence. Desperate for money, he approaches Lyte and shows him the christening cup. Lyte assumes that Johnny stole the cup, and files charges against him. Josiah Quincy defends Johnny in court. Introducing Priscilla as a witness, Quincy proves Johnny's innocence.

Afterward, Tremain and the Sons of Liberty became active in several notable events leading to the American Revolution, including the Boston Tea Party, Paul Revere's Ride, and the Battles of Lexington and Concord. During the Boston Tea Party, Dr. Joseph Warren offers to restore Tremain's hand, allowing him to return to his profession.

== Cast ==
- Hal Stalmaster as Johnny Tremain
- Luana Patten as Priscilla Lapham
- Jeff York as James Otis
- Sebastian Cabot as Jonathan Lyte
- Richard Beymer as Rab Silsbee
- Rusty Lane as Samuel Adams
- Walter Sande as Paul Revere
- Whit Bissell as Josiah Quincy
- Walter Coy as Dr. Joseph Warren
- Will Wright as Mr. Lapham
- Virginia Christine as Mrs. Lapham
- Ralph Clanton as General Gage
- Lumsden Hare as Admiral Montagu
- Gavin Gordon as Colonel Smith
- Geoffrey Toone as Major Pitcairn

Walt Disney's daughter Sharon Mae Disney also had a small uncredited role as Dorcas, a young friend of Johnny and Priscilla (who in the novel was one of Priscilla's sisters).

== Music ==
The musical score for Johnny Tremain was composed by George Bruns with lyrics by Tom Blackburn. The film is notable for the song "Liberty Tree", which was later included on the 1964 Disneyland Records album entitled Happy Birthday and Songs for Every Holiday.

Billy Vaughn and his Orchestra recorded a version of The Johnny Tremain Theme, released as a single in 1957 on Dot Records 45-15598, featuring his orchestra in an easy-listening instrumental style of the theme, in contrast to the film's own vocal soundtrack.

== Release ==
The film's theatrical release was accompanied by two Disney short subjects: the live-action nature story The Wetback Hound, and the cartoon special The Story of Anyburg U.S.A..

Louis Marx and Company released an American War of Independence playset featuring character figures of the actors in the show as a film tie-in.

The film opened in London but was not successful and Disney initially decided not to release the film in Europe.

Portions of Johnny Tremain were released individually in 1968 for educational purposes. Two distinct sequences of the film were re-issued under the titles The Boston Tea Party and The Shot Heard 'Round the World. Both were originally combined and shown on Disney's anthology TV series in 1958 as part of the episode The Liberty Story.

== Legacy ==
Around the time of the film's production, Walt Disney intended to build Liberty Street in Disneyland as an annex to Main Street USA. The project never materialized. After Walt's death, the concept was revived and turned into the much more expansive Liberty Square in Walt Disney World, which opened as a part of the park's grand opening on October 1, 1971. A southern live oak tree found growing on the Walt Disney World property (originally six miles from the Magic Kingdom) was transplanted by Disney engineers and now serves as the square's Liberty Tree. Adorning it are 13 lanterns, representing the original 13 American colonies.

== See also ==
- List of films about the American Revolution
- List of American films of 1957
