= Alberta Nelson =

American actress (1937–2006)

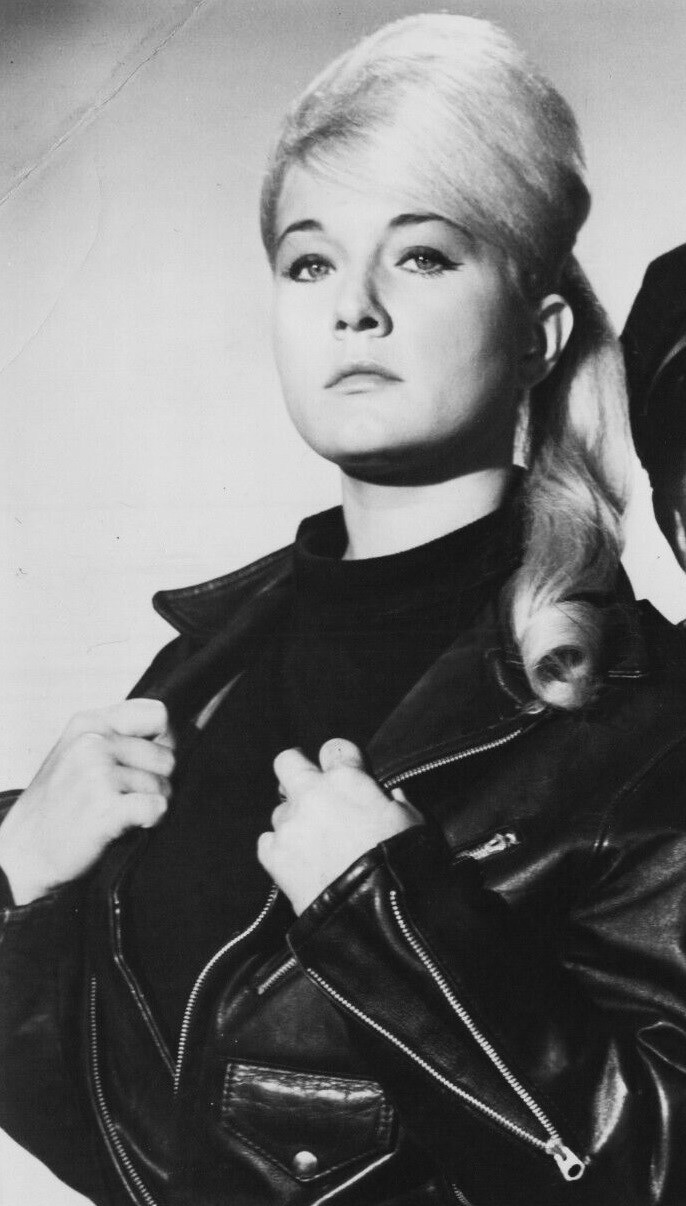
- Nelson in Pajama Party (1964)
- Born: August 14, 1937; Erie, Pennsylvania, U.S.
- Died: April 29, 2006 (aged 68)
- Education: Andrews School for Girls
- Spouses: Ryan MacDonald; Herbert Lester Gilman

Alberta Nelson (August 14, 1937 – April 29, 2006) was an American television and film actress. After several dramatic parts in television in the early 1960s, she made four appearances on The Andy Griffith Show.

== Early years ==
Nelson was born in Erie, Pennsylvania, to Frank Alton Nelson (1909–1959) and Katherine Storkel Stephens Nelson (1900–1982). Her only sibling was a half-sister, Irene Stephens McAleer (1919–1994). After graduating from the Andrews School for Girls in Willoughby, Ohio, in 1955, she briefly attended St. John's Hospital School of Nursing in Cleveland, Ohio. In the late 1950s, she moved to New York City, where she modeled and did theatre acting.

== Career ==
With the urging and assistance of her cousin, the theatrical producer John Kenley (February 20, 1906 – October 23, 2009), Nelson ventured into acting with the Erie Playhouse in Erie, Pennsylvania, and eventually played the lead in a production of The Seven Year Itch. She went on to appear in Broadway plays including Once There Was a Russian, The Wall, and The Gang's All Here.

Nelson appeared in seven movies in the 1960s as one of Eric Von Zipper's "mice" in the American International Beach Party series. She made four appearances on The Andy Griffith Show (and one on Mayberry RFD), all but one as waitress Flora Malherbe.

In 1965 she appeared in a memorable episode of The Dick Van Dyke Show ("Go Tell The Birds And The Bees") as Ritchie's teacher, Miss Reshovsky.

Nelson starred in 1970s The Wild Scene as Dr. Virginia Grant, a female psychiatrist who talks graphically about her tawdriest cases. This and a 1970 appearance on Love, American Style would be Nelson's last credited roles.

== Personal life ==
Nelson married Ryan MacDonald (Machunas) around 1956 in Erie, Pa. Their son Adam Ryan was born in New York City around 1957, but died of SIDS at two months of age. Adam is buried in Holy Cross Cemetery in Philadelphia, Pa., where Ryan's family lived. Alberta had no other children with MacDonald. Ryan and Alberta divorced around 1962 and after acting success in New York City, she moved to California, where she pursued an acting career. She remarried, to Herbert Lester Gilman (b. November 19, 1922 – June 29, 2007), on February 14, 1971, in Erie. She and Gilman had no children together but Herbert had three adult children from his first marriage.

== Death ==
Nelson fought cancer of the jaw/throat for several years, dying on April 29, 2006, at age 68, in Erie, Pennsylvania. (Note: The book Obituaries in the Performing Arts, 2006: Film, Television, Radio, Theatre, Dance, Music, Cartoons and Pop Culture says that she died in Pennsylvania. But according to her death certificate she died at Herbert Gilman's daughter's house in Willoughby, Lake County Ohio.) She was buried next to her mother and father at Laurel Hill Cemetery, Erie, Pennsylvania, on May 2, 2006. Herbert Gilman died on June 29, 2007. He was buried at Laurel Hill Cemetery on July 1, 2007.

== Filmography ==
- Beach Party (1963) – rat pack member
- Muscle Beach Party (1964) – muscle girl (Lisa)
- Bikini Beach (1964) – Puss/Alberta (Rat Pack member)
- Pajama Party (1964) – Alberta (Rat Pack member)
- Beach Blanket Bingo (1965) – Puss (Rat Pack member)
- How to Stuff a Wild Bikini (1965) – Puss
- Sergeant Deadhead (1965) – NASA secretary
- Dr. Goldfoot and the Bikini Machine (1965) – "bad robot" reject #12
- The Ghost in the Invisible Bikini (1966) – Alberta / Puss
- The Wild Scene (1970) – Dr. Virginia Grant (final film role)
