= Frances Fong =

American actress (1927–2012)

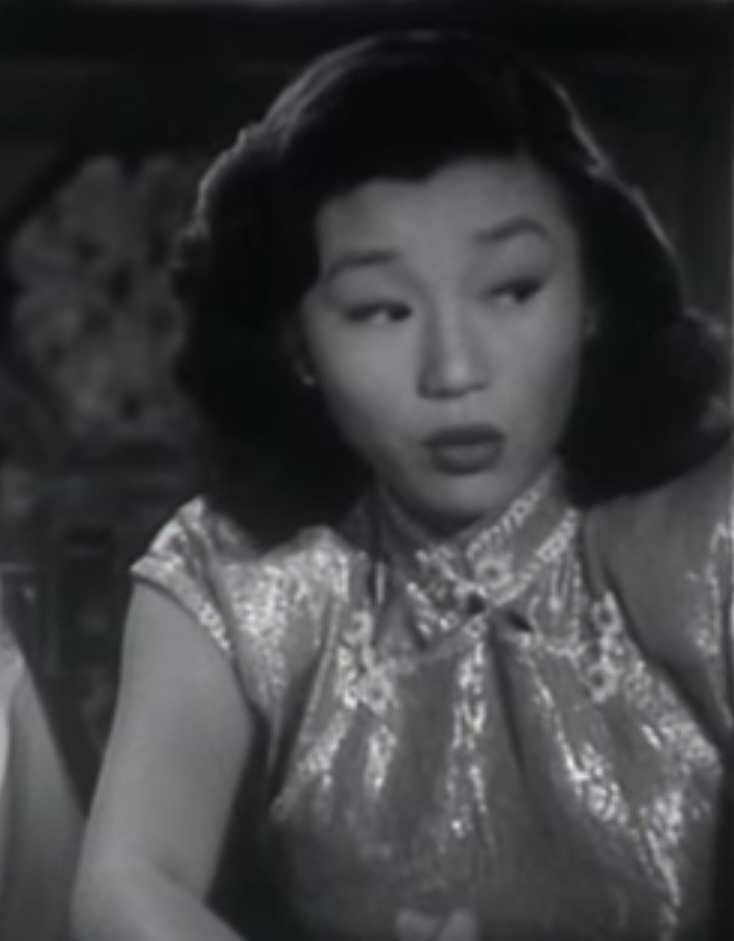
- Fong in Women in the Night (1948)
- Born: Frances Chung; September 22, 1927; Honolulu, Hawaii, U.S.
- Died: October 24, 2012 (aged 85)
- Education: Roosevelt High School, Honolulu; Long Beach City College
- Occupations: Singer, actress
- Years active: 1945–1999
- Known for: Women in the Night; Hellfighters; Rush Hour
- Spouses: Leslie Howard Fong (m. 1946; div. 1949); George Kim Fong (m. 1950; died 2012)
- Children: 3

Frances Fong (born Frances Chung; September 22, 1927 – October 24, 2012) was an American singer and actress whose performing career spanned over fifty years.

== Early life ==
She was born Frances Chung (Note: Mainland newspapers routinely cited her family name as "Ching", but Hawaiian newspapers, government and school records show it as "Chung") in Honolulu, in what was then the Territory of Hawaii. Her parents, Francis Chung and Emma Leong Chung, were both born in Hawaii to immigrants from China. She had one older brother. Her father started as an electrician repairing appliances in a shop, and later became an executive of a lumber company. When the children were old enough for school, her mother worked as a packer in a pineapple cannery. English was Frances Chung's only language growing up.

Frances Chung attended Kalihi-weana Elementary, Kalakaua Junior High, and Roosevelt High School. At Roosevelt she was active in student government, volunteered in the school library, and was a member of the A Cappella Choir and Swim Club. She also belonged to the school's Allied Youth Organization, for which she was vice-president. During high school Frances Chung took part in USO entertainments in Hawaii, and performed in a continuing community variety show called "The Gay Nineties".

After graduating from Roosevelt High School in June 1945, she attended Long Beach City College (LBCC) on the mainland, studying Dramatics.

== MGM contract ==
After just a few weeks at LBCC, Frances Chung was in a show for war workers at Douglas Aircraft Corporation. Francis Lederer spotted her and brought her to the attention of MGM scouts, who had her tested for a part in Holiday in Mexico. She got the part and a contract, though her performance wound up on the cutting room floor.

She continued to use Frances Chung as billing for all movies she made while under contract to MGM from 1945 thru 1948, despite having been married in May 1946. She was first loaned to 20th Century for an uncredited bit in Anna and the King of Siam. She was then loaned to Universal for a thirteen part serial, Lost City of the Jungle, her first credited part. Back at MGM in 1947, she was in Dark Delusion (sometimes mistakenly cited as Dark Illusion). For 1948 she was loaned out again, to Paramount for Saigon. Her final film in 1948 may have been done after her MGM contract finished, an independent production titled Women in the Night. A mildly lurid melodrama, it did provide her with screen credit and newspaper publicity.

== Film, TV, and singing ==
Following 1948 she had no film roles for seven years. She joined a twelve-piece band called "The Cathayans", doing lead vocals for engagements at the St. Francis Hotel and other San Francisco venues. During winter 1953-54 she entered a contest for Miss Chinese New Year Festival, the winner to be determined by which contestant sold the most festival entry tickets. (Note: The rules were evidently flexible as to marital status) Though not a beauty contest, a photo of her and two other contestants was widely circulated among newspapers around the country.

The publicity led to Frances Fong (as she now billed herself) obtaining parts in at least four episodes of The New Adventures of China Smith during 1954. Her first television work, this series set in Singapore and nearby locales used her in different roles rather than as a recurring character. This led to her next film, Soldier of Fortune, a Hong Kong-based story starring Clark Gable. She didn't receive screen credit, but was mentioned favorably in newspaper reviews. She had another uncredited role in Hell on Frisco Bay (working title The Darkest Hour) which was filmed in April and May 1955, but not released until 1956. Fong had another uncredited bit part in Around the World in 80 Days, plus appearances on television series Navy Log and Cavalcade of America during 1956.

== Nightclub work ==
During 1956 Fong created a nightclub act that played for nineteen months at the New Frontier and seven months at the Thunderbird. The act was built around her singing, with some sultry dance routines and jokes added. She was top billed at San Francisco's Forbidden City during the last quarter of 1958, with local columnists noting whenever she temporarily left to film a show in Hollywood. Fong herself described her routine to an interviewer: "I wear sleek gowns, sing sexy songs. The women don't like it, but the men do." An example of her repartee between the songs and dances: "All I ever meet are Cads driving Jags".

For all her engagements, Fong's contract allowed her time off for television work. Her nightclub wardrobe enhanced her value for television roles in which she played an entertainer. While still at Forbidden City she started working for Warner Brothers Television, doing episodes of 77 Sunset Strip and Lawman. For the former, she was required to speak Chinese over the phone. Since she didn't know the language she started taking lessons, to which fact publicity agents tipped reporters.

== TV work: 1959–1961 ==
By January 1959 Fong had quit nightclub work in favor of television. For the next three years she had parts in a dozen different TV series, some of them for multiple episodes. She had been cast for recurring roles in two series, Shark Street and Brady, but after filming the pilot episodes both shows remained unsold. Some of the shows she did appear in such as Peter Gunn, Hawaiian Eye, Bachelor Father, and Perry Mason were quite popular, so that she felt it worthwhile to purchase a modest second home in Van Nuys instead of commuting from San Francisco and staying in hotels.

However, she also did a number of short-lived and single season shows: Yancy Derringer, 21 Beacon Street, Johnny Midnight, The Case of the Dangerous Robin, and Mr. Garlund which only lasted seven episodes. With no series regular or recurring roles on the horizon, Fong decided to take a chance on performing live again, this time in theatre.

== Pajama Tops ==
From June 1962 Fong was involved with a touring company production of the French farce Pajama Tops. So far as is known, this was her only appearance on the stage. The play, adapted from Moumou by Jean de Létraz, had been running steadily for five years in small Los Angeles theaters with an ever-changing cast. Producers Stan Seiden and Zev Buffman decided to take it on tour, beginning with the Moore Theatre in Seattle. That city was then hosting the World's Fair, ensuring large visiting crowds.

The action centered around three "couples" at a Deauville country house, with a diminutive police inspector as odd man out. The touring company cast was small, just seven actors, with John Agar and June Wilkinson as the stars. Fong, as the ambitious maid "Claudine", Cliff Halle, Leslie Vallen, Brad Logan, and Don McArt completed the cast, while Richard Vath directed the action. The broad comedy included many intentional prop mishaps and stage miscues, delighting audiences and appalling critics. After nine SRO weeks in Seattle, the company moved to Miami's Coconut Grove Playhouse, where it set performance records with another nine week run. From there it went to Pittsburgh's Nixon Theatre, then to Kingston, Jamaica, St. Louis, Kansas City, Baltimore, and other cities for two and three week runs.

The year-long tour playing what was essentially a burlesque given a veneer of stage legitimacy took its toll on the players. Director Richard Vath had to take over Agar's part and James Winslow replaced Logan as the butler "Jacques". Fong and Wilkinson had reportedly stopped speaking to each other off-stage. Finally, in a reversal of the usual process, the comedy went to Broadway in late May 1963, where it had 4 previews and 52 performances at the Winter Garden Theatre. Towards the end of the run, Wilkinson deliberately upstaged Fong during the latter's big scene, causing a backstage brawl that left the stage manager, who unwisely tried to intervene, with a sore jaw.

Pajama Tops had occupied over a year of Fong's career and given her the cachet of a Broadway production, albeit one that a critic said "may set the theater back a few millenium". It had also taken her away from Hollywood and television; her last two TV episodes had been filmed in 1961 (Note: These were episodes of The Beachcomber, filmed on location in Florida to mimic the South Pacific) and it would be 1965 before she returned to the small screen.

== Later career ==
Fong returned to television in 1965, doing two or three series episodes or TV movies each year up to 1982, when her small screen work became much more intermittent. She was now a character actor rather than a leading lady. She had a small part in the John Wayne film Hellfighters during 1968. She was credited with doing three movies in the 1970s and 1980s, Golden Needles, Dragon Force, and Bruce Lee's Dragons Fight Back that may actually have been performed by a much younger Hong Kong based actress with the same name. This may also have been the case with a 1990 episode of a Hong Kong made British television series Yellowthread Street.

Her last film was a bit part in 1998 for Rush Hour, while her last television work was a year later for Martial Law.

Fong died on October 24, 2012; the place and cause of death are not public knowledge.

== Personal life ==
Growing up in Honolulu, Frances Chung was known as a strong swimmer and body surfer. She also liked fishing and sea diving, both of which she was taught by her father. She was fond of Russian cuisine and became adept at cooking it. She took part in a charity auto race and rally along with other celebrities in 1962.

When Frances Chung was first signed to an MGM contract in 1945, she met actor Leslie Fong, who had just appeared in Tokyo Rose. They were married May 18, 1946 in San Francisco, where Fong's family owned a men's clothing store. The couple had two sons, both of whom went into acting: Leslie Howard Fong Jr and Brian Fong (Chase). While married to Leslie Fong, Frances Chung continued to use her birth name for professional credits. The couple divorced after the birth of their second son.

Frances Chung then met and married George Kim Fong, a CPA and USAAF veteran from Oakland, California. They had one son together and maintained a primary residence in San Francisco. It was only after this second marriage that she switched to using "Frances Fong" for professional billing. George and Frances Fong shared an interest in Chinese ceramics; they donated their large collection to the Berkeley Art Museum in 1996.

She was the grandmother of Khalil Fong.

== Filmography ==
Film (by year of first release)
Year	Title	Role	Notes
1946	Holiday in Mexico	Chinese Girl	Uncredited bit as daughter of Chinese Ambassador was cut during editing
1946	Anna and the King of Siam		Uncredited bit part
1946	Lost City of the Jungle	Lakana Shan	
1947	Dark Delusion	Toots	Uncredited
1948	Saigon	Chinese Nurse	Uncredited
1948	Women in the Night	Li Ling	A feature role as one of six women in Axis captivity
1955	Soldier of Fortune	Maxine Chan	Uncredited but publicized role as American-educated Chinese girl
1956	Hell on Frisco Bay		Uncredited role as a hepcat
1956	Around the World in 80 Days		Uncredited
1968	Hellfighters	Madame Loo	Small part has her as a distraction to John Wayne's marriage
1974	Golden Needles	Su Lin	
1982	Dragon Force	Su Lim	
1985	Bruce Lee's Dragons Fight Back		
1998	Rush Hour	Socialite	

Television (in original broadcast order)
Year	Series	Episode	Role	Notes
1954	The New Adventures of China Smith	The Yellow Jade Lion	Mai Lin	
1954	The New Adventures of China Smith	The Broken Rice Bowl of Chen Lo	Precious Star	Fong plays a blind girl
1954	The New Adventures of China Smith	Nightmare in Green		
1954	The New Adventures of China Smith	Spectacles of Heaven		Takes place in a Siamese province
1956	Navy Log	Operation Typewriter	Miss Ling	Episode set in China during World War II
1956	Cavalcade of America	Diplomatic Outpost	Miss Lou	
1958	Tombstone Territory	Tong War	Mei Long	Fong spurns Tong leader for Lum Chen (James Hong)
1958	State Trooper	The Case of the Happy Dragon	Mei Ling Kam	
1958	The Adventures of McGraw (Note: This series was also known as Meet McGraw when rebroadcast in later years)	The Long Aloha	Mrs. Soong	
1958	77 Sunset Strip	The Well-Selected Frame	Lotus Wong	Fong gets to show off her swimming for Roger Smith
1958	Lawman	The Intruders	May Ling	She plays widow of slain man (Philip Ahn)
1959	Peter Gunn	Lady Windbell's Fan	Lillian Quon	
1959	Yancy Derringer	The Quiet Firecracker	Ruby	
1959	21 Beacon Street	The Trojan Horse	Lao	Fong played a secretary for an import company
1960	Bachelor Father	Bentley and the Bartered Bride	Delores Wong	Peter Fong (Sammee Tong) wants her to be his bride
1960	Bachelor Father	Bentley, the Model Citizen	Anna May	
1960	Johnny Midnight	The Impresario	Mikito	
1960	Bachelor Father	A Man of Importance	Susie	
1960	Mr. Garlund	(Pilot)		This series lasted just six episodes on CBS
1961	Perry Mason	The Case of the Waylaid Wolf	Frances Kim	
1961	Hawaiian Eye	Dragon Road	Poppy Shu	She plays a kidnapped fashion model in Hong Kong
1961	The Case of the Dangerous Robin	Falling Star	Domenique Chan	Fong plays Eurasian film star murdered in an insurance fraud
1961	Hawaiian Eye	Thomas Jefferson Chu	Lisa Chu	She plays a Taiwanese night club singer, sister of the title character (George Takei)
1962	The Beachcomber	The Day of the Whale	Kina	
1962	The Beachcomber	Flight to Freedom	Ilana	
1965	Run for Your Life	The Voice of Gina Milan	Mitzi Kuan	
1965	My Three Sons	The Hong Kong Story	Lucy	Odd casting has Fong play old flame to Uncle Charley (William Demarest) (Note: Demarest was 35 years older than Fong)
1966	The Man From U.N.C.L.E.	The Abominable Snowman Affair	Baku's Mother	
1967	Gomer Pyle: USMC	You Bet Your Won Ton	Mrs. Wong	Fong's restaurant conceals a gambling den
1967	The F.B.I.	By Force and Violence: Part 1	Becky Lee	Fong plays a secretary
1967	The F.B.I.	By Force and Violence: Part 2	Becky Lee	
1968	It Takes a Thief	When Good Friends Get Together	Madame Chen	Fong plays a diplomat's wife
1969	The Name of the Game	The Incomparable Connie Walker	Arlene	
1969	Family Affair	Number One Boy	Batty Ng	
1970	Bewitched	Samantha's Better Halves	Mrs. Tanaka	
1970	Mod Squad	A Town Called Sincere	Sergeant Imoto	
1972	Anna and the King	The Baby	Kralahome's Wife	
1972	Anna and the King	The Chimes	Man-Yah	
1972	Mod Squad	The Twain	Landlady	
1974	Judge Dee and the Monastery Murders	(TV Movie)	Mrs. Pao	
1974	Kung Fu	A Small Beheading	Woman	
1975	Harry O	For the Love of Money	Maid	
1975	Kung Fu	One Step to Darkness	Nurse	
1976	M*A*S*H	Bug Out	Rosie	Fong plays a Korean tavern owner
1976	All in the Family	Archie's Operation Part 2	Nurse	
1977	Panic in Echo Park	(TV Movie)		This was a pilot for a proposed series
1977	M*A*S*H	Fallen Idol	Rosie	Fong reprised her character from previous year
1977	Mary Jane Harper Cried Last Night	(TV Movie)	Ivy Chin	
1979	CHiPs	Rally 'Round the Bank	1st Teller	
1979	Breaking Up Is Hard to Do	(TV Movie)	Nurse Grant	Another nurse bit in this four hour two part TV movie
1979	Hart to Hart	The Man with the Jade Eyes	Shopkeeper	
1980	Stone	Deep Sleeper		
1981	Twirl	(TV Movie)	Mrs. King	Fong plays mother of baton twirler (Rosalind Chao)
1982	Bring 'Em Back Alive	The Best of Enemies	Alice Wong	
1990	Yellowthread Street	Fan Tan Man	Mo Fay	This was a British series made in Hong Kong
1999	Martial Law	End Game	Kai Lee	
