= Coronado 9 =

American crime drama television series

- DVD cover.
- Genre: Crime drama
- Directed by: Dann Cahn; Henry S. Kesler
- Starring: Rod Cameron
- Country of origin: United States
- Original language: English
- No. of seasons: 1
- No. of episodes: 39

Production
- Camera setup: Single-camera
- Running time: 30 minutes
- Production company: Revue Studios

Original release
- Network: Syndication
- Release: September 6, 1960 – May 31, 1961

Coronado 9 is an American crime drama series starring Rod Cameron that aired in syndication in 1960.

== Synopsis ==
Set in San Diego, California, the series follows Dan Adams (Cameron), a former United States Navy intelligence officer turned private detective. The show's title was taken from the telephone exchange of Adams's office.

The Revue Productions series had 39 episodes that aired from September 6, 1960, and May 31, 1961.

Coronado 9 was produced by Richard Irving. Lawrence Kimble wrote scripts for it. It was sponsored in at least 70 markets by the Falstaff Brewing Company.

== Guest stars ==
- Robert Anderson
- Rayford Barnes
- Kathie Browne
- King Calder
- Anthony Caruso
- Virginia Christine
- Steve Darrell
- Don Devlin
- Roy Engel
- Bill Erwin
- Beverly Garland
- John Goddard
- Coleen Gray
- Clark Howat
- Ted Jordan
- DeForest Kelley
- Robert Knapp
- Sue Ane Langdon
- Nan Leslie
- Ann McCrea
- Doug McClure
- Eve Miller
- Read Morgan
- Ed Nelson
- Jay Novello
- J. Pat O'Malley
- Cosmo Sardo
- William Schallert
- Alfred Shelly
- David White

== Production notes ==
The series was produced by Revue Studios, and filmed in San Diego except for two episodes made in Honolulu and New Orleans.

== Home media ==
On December 14, 2010, Timeless Media Group released Coronado 9 - The Complete Series on DVD in Region 1.
