= Paul Revere and the World He Lived In =

History book by Esther Forbes

- Pulitzer Prize in History 1943
- Author: Esther Forbes
- Language: English
- Genre: Non-fiction
- Publication date: 1942
- Publication place: United States
- Pages: 510

Paul Revere and the World He Lived In is a nonfiction history book by Esther Forbes. It won the 1943 Pulitzer Prize for History.
