= Gwen Akin =

American photographer

- Born: 1950 (age 75–76)
- Occupation: Photographer.
- Spouse: Allan Ludwig

Gwen Akin (born 1950) is an American photographer.

Akin is known for her work photographing 19th-century medical specimens that were shot at the Mütter Museum in Philadelphia, United States. The photographic series were printed using a platinum print process, that gave the morbid specimens of body parts and medical abnormalities a "romantic beauty". The series was created in collaboration with her former husband, Allan Ludwig.

Akin's work has been exhibited at the Kemper Museum of Contemporary Art, the New Museum of Contemporary Art, the New Mexico Museum of Art, White Columns, among other venues.

Her work is included in the collections of the Los Angeles County Museum of Art, the Harry Ransom Center, the Center for Creative Photography, and the Museum of Fine Arts, Houston.
