= Flight to Nowhere =

1946 film by William Rowland

- Film poster
- Directed by: William Rowland
- Written by: Arthur V. Jones
- Produced by: William B. David
- Starring: Alan Curtis; Evelyn Ankers; Micheline Cheirel
- Cinematography: Marcel Le Picard
- Edited by: Gregg C. Tallas
- Music by: Carl Hoefle; Bert Reisfeld
- Production company: Golden Gate Pictures
- Distributed by: Screen Guild Productions (US); Exclusive Films(UK)
- Release date: October 1, 1946 (United States)
- Running time: 79 minutes
- Country: United States
- Language: English

Flight to Nowhere is a 1946 American film noir crime film directed by William Rowland and starring Alan Curtis, Evelyn Ankers and Micheline Cheirel. An independent film, it was one of the first postwar productions to deal with the atom bomb secrets.

== Plot ==
In Honolulu, an operative carrying a map revealing secret uranium deposits in the South Pacific is gunned down. Meanwhile, in Los Angeles, "Hobie" Carrington (Alan Curtis) tries to turn down Countess Maria de Fresca's (Micheline Cheirel) request to hire him as a pilot for a flight to Death Valley. She changes his mind by promising him a dinner date. Before they can depart, Carrington is approached by his former superior in the armed forces, Bob Donovan (Jack Holt), now an FBI agent. Donovan tells Carrington to keep an eye out for the missing map.

The Countess and her party, including wealthy Catherine Forrest (Evelyn Ankers), Catherine's friend, James Van Bush (Roland Varno), Catherine's brother, Claude Forrest (John Craven), and mining engineer Gerald Porter (Jerome Cowan) are told they might need oxygen masks mid-flight in overflying a storm. Catherine and the Countess switch seats, but her oxygen mask has been disconnected, forcing Carrington to dive to save Catherine's life. The Countess later tells Carrington she fears someone may have actually been meaning to kill her.

Agent Donovan beats the flight to Death Valley and explains to Carrington that his passengers may be international racketeers who likely have the map. The group meets up with Tom Walker (Gordon Richards), another mining engineer. While separately trying to buy the map from Claude Forrest, Walker tries to bribe the Countess for a secret letter about Claude. By coincidence, Carrington's ex-wife, Irene Allison (Inez Cooper), also in Death Valley, knows the Countess is really Dolly Lorraine, an aspiring actress, who Irene worked with in a magic show. Later, Carrington rescues Catherine from Van Bush by throwing the annoying masher into the swimming pool. Carrington then discovers that Catherine has an unusual gold ring from Japan given to her by Claude. During the course of the evening, the secret letter is stolen five times, the fifth time stolen from Tom Walker, who is murdered.

The group is briefly questioned about the murder, and (having failed to sell the map), they have Carrington fly them to Las Vegas. As Irene lives in Las Vegas and wishes to return home, she asks to join them. In Vegas, Claude tries to sell the map to another engineer, Joseph Herman Ruehl (Michael Visaroff). Donovan tells Carrington that the secret letter revealed Claude committed treason, working with the Japanese to find uranium, and the two realize the map is actually Catherine's ring. Irene, a licensed pilot, borrows Carrington's aircraft, which has been sabotaged, and dies in a crash.

Porter has been waiting for an opportunity to steal the map and, after a struggle, kills Claude at Ruehl's horse ranch. The Countess and Ruehl are detained by Donovan before they can leave town. Carrington, discovering that Van Bush is no more than a gold digger after Catherine's money, shoves Van Bush in a pool again. Carrington and Catherine arrive at the ranch, looking for Claude, and Porter demands Catherine's ring. Donovan arrives in time to shoot Porter before he can harm Carrington or Catherine. In the end, Catherine and Carrington will fly to Las Vegas to be married, with Donovan as the best man.

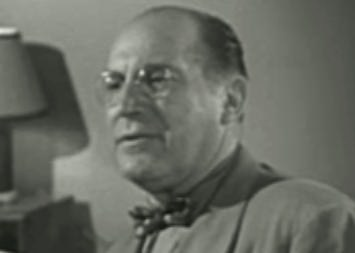
Michael Visaroff in the film

== Cast ==
- Alan Curtis as "Hobie" Carrington
- Evelyn Ankers as Catherine Forrest
- Micheline Cheirel as Dolly Lorraine, aka Countess Maria de Fresca
- Jack Holt as FBI Agent Bob Donovan
- Jerome Cowan as Gerald Porter
- John Craven as Claude Forrest
- Inez Cooper as Irene Allison
- Roland Varno as James Van Bush
- Michael Visaroff as Joseph Herman Ruehl
- Gordon Richards as Tom Walker
- Hoot Gibson as Sheriff Bradley
- Donald Kerr (uncredited)

== Production ==
Flight to Nowhere was announced in April 1946. On location shooting for Flight to Nowhere took place mainly in Las Vegas, Nevada and just outside the city, and Death Valley, California. Two hotels, the Furnace Creek Inn in Death Valley, and the Last Frontier hotel in Las Vegas, were featured.

Flight to Nowhere was a B film, hampered by a modest budget although the film featured Evelyn Ankers, an actress who had made her reputation as a "scream queen" in that low-cost world. With the plot based on a pilot caught up in a smuggling ring, a Lockheed Model 12 Electra Junior (c/n 1258, s/n 38-541, NC19933) was used. (Note: NC19933 also appeared in State of the Union (1948) and Donovan's Brain (1953).)

== Reception ==
According to film historian Christian Santoir, Flight to Nowhere is "a historical document". He notes: "In spite of a good casting, this film with a meager budget, is handicapped by a confused scenario, in which the plane holds a very small part, although one of the main characters is a pilot. On the other hand, we have time to appreciate the hotels in Death Valley and Las Vegas (the "Last Frontier" with its swimming pool, its bar, its casino, Club "21" ...) in 1948, a time when Las Vegas as a city is still sparsely populated, but growing fast."

The review by M, Tinee, in the Chicago Daily Tribune, was succinct, "It offers the usual sinister character, sluggings, etc., none of it worth your time."
