= Virginia Christine =

American actress (1920–1996)

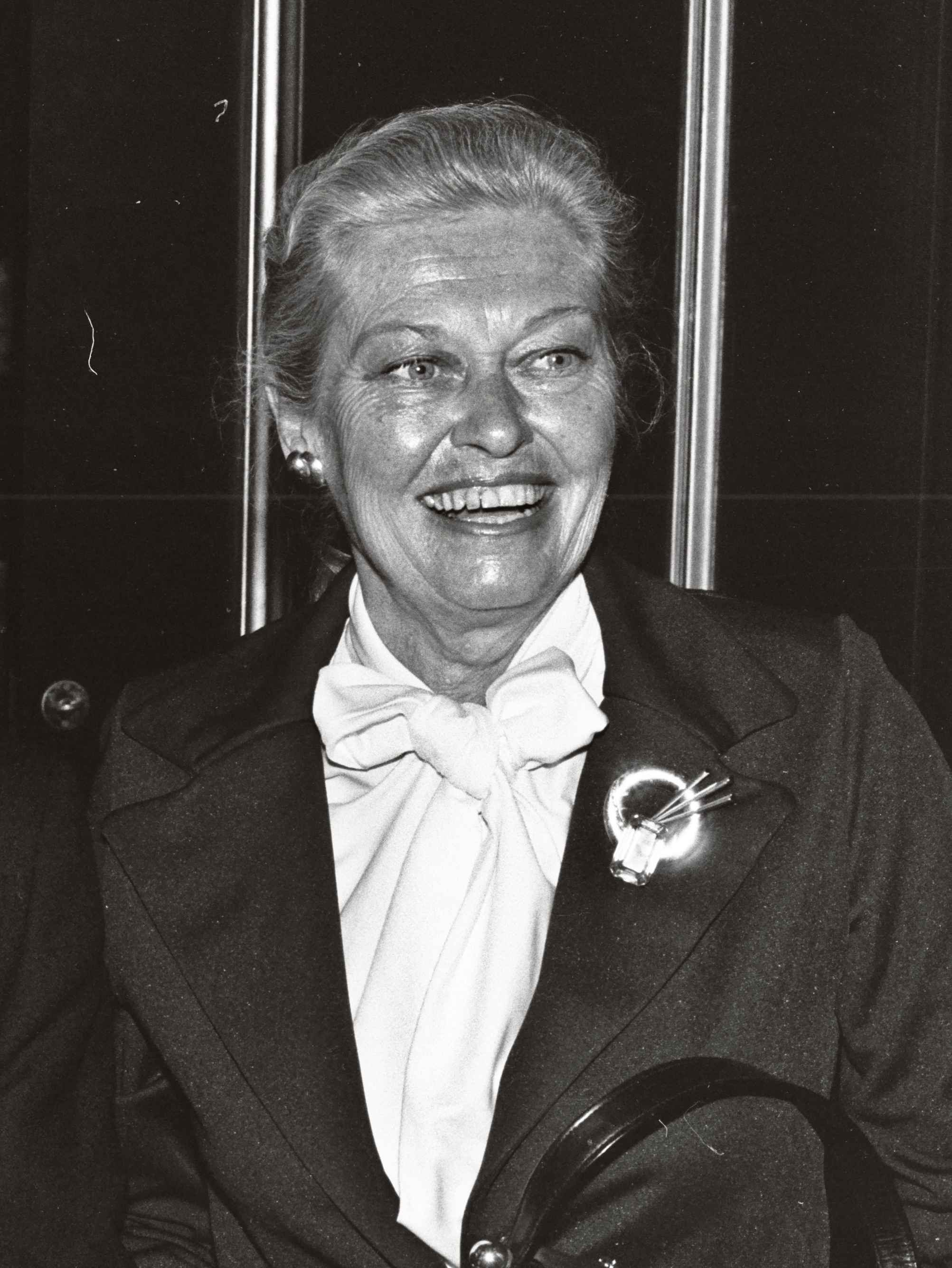
- Virginia Christine in 1979
- Born: Virginia Christine Ricketts; March 5, 1920; Stanton, Iowa, U.S.
- Died: July 24, 1996 (aged 76); Brentwood, Los Angeles, California, U.S.
- Resting place: Mount Sinai Memorial Park Cemetery
- Other name: Virginia Christine Kraft
- Education: University of California, Los Angeles
- Occupation: Actress
- Years active: 1943–1979
- Spouse: Fritz Feld (m. 1940; died 1993)
- Children: 2

Virginia Christine (born Virginia Christine Ricketts; March 5, 1920 – July 24, 1996) was an American stage, radio, film, television, and voice actress. Though Christine had a long career as a character actress in film and television, she may be best remembered as "Mrs. Olson" (or the "Folgers Coffee Woman") in a string of television commercials for Folgers Coffee during the 1960s and 1970s.

== Early life ==
Virginia Christine Ricketts was born in Stanton, Iowa, of Swedish descent. Upon her mother's remarriage, she changed her last name to Kraft. The family later moved to Des Moines, the state capital, in central Iowa, where Virginia attended Elmwood Elementary School. The family relocated again to Des Moines County in the southeastern part of the state. There, Christine attended Mediapolis High School, where she aspired to be a concert pianist. Her family later moved to California, where she enrolled at UCLA.

== Career ==
=== Radio and films ===
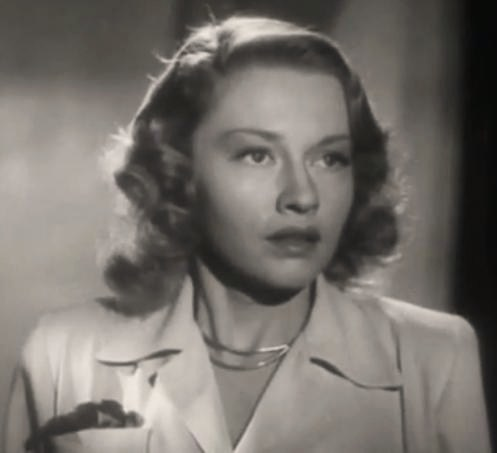
Virginia Christine in Women in the Night

Christine began working in radio during college. She appeared in 23 episodes of the radio version of Gunsmoke: "Cholera" (December 4, 1954), "Poor Pearl" (February 19, 1955), "Change of Heart" (September 3, 1955), "Good Girl, Bad Company" (October 8, 1955), "Sunny Afternoon" (December 4, 1955), "Cows and Cribs" (May 13, 1956), "Belle's Back" (September 9, 1956), "Dirty Bill's Girl" (October 28, 1956), "Fingered" (November 23, 1957), "Tag You're It" (October 5, 1958), "Matt's Decision" (September 6, 1959), "Big Chugg Wilson" (December 6, 1959), "Bless Me 'Till I Die" (January 24, 1960), "Delia's Father" (February 7, 1960), "Prescribed Killing" (February 28, 1960), "Solomon River" (April 17, 1960), "Busted Up Guns" (July 17, 1960), "Tumbleweed" (August 28, 1960), "Two Mothers" (September 18, 1960), "Jedro's Woman" (November 6, 1960), "Kitty's Good Neighboring" (December 4, 1960), "Love of Money" (February 5, 1961), and "Ma's Justice" (May 7, 1961).

She began training for a theatrical career with actor/director Fritz Feld, whom she married in 1940. In 1942, she made her stage debut in the Los Angeles production of Hedda Gabler. While performing in the play, she was spotted by an agent from Warner Bros., who signed her to a film contract with the studio. Her first film for Warner Bros. was Edge of Darkness (1943), in which she played a Norwegian peasant girl. She was dropped by Warner Bros. in 1943 and signed with Universal Pictures in 1944. That year, Christine had a supporting role in The Mummy's Curse and The Wife of Monte Cristo, with her husband Fritz Feld (the two went on to appear together in the Western 4 for Texas in 1963).

In 1946, she appeared in The Scarlet Horseman, a 13-chapter film serial playing Carla Marquette, or Matosca, followed by a supporting role in the mystery film The Inner Circle. Christine's next film for Universal was the film noir classic The Killers. She initially tested for the lead role of femme fatale Kitty Collins, but lost out to Ava Gardner. The film's producer, Mark Hellinger, was impressed with her test and cast her as Lilly Harmon Lubinsky, the wife of Lt. Sam Lubinsky (Sam Levene). Christine also portrayed Miss Watston in the 1964 remake of the film, starring Lee Marvin and Angie Dickinson.

In 1950, she played an uncredited supporting role in The Men. Although the part was small and the film was not a commercial success, her performance impressed the film's producer, Stanley Kramer. She became a favorite of his, and went on to appear in a number of his films, including Cyrano de Bergerac (1950) and High Noon (1952). Kramer later cast her in the 1955 drama Not as a Stranger, where she played a countrywoman. She also coached the film's star Olivia de Havilland on her Swedish accent. The following year, she co-starred in the horror film Invasion of the Body Snatchers. In 1961, Kramer cast her again as a German housekeeper in Judgment at Nuremberg. One of her most notable roles was as Hilary St. George, the bigoted co-worker of Katharine Hepburn's character in the 1967 film Guess Who's Coming to Dinner.

=== Television ===
In addition to her work in films, Christine appeared in numerous television series. In the 1950s, she appeared in multiple guest roles on The Abbott and Costello Show, Four Star Playhouse, Dragnet, Alfred Hitchcock Presents, The Ford Television Theatre, Gunsmoke, Science Fiction Theatre, Matinee Theatre, Father Knows Best, The Donna Reed Show, Trackdown, State Trooper, Wanted: Dead or Alive, The Rifleman, Letter to Loretta, Adventures of Superman, and General Electric Theater. In November 1959, Christine co-starred as the wife of a verbally abusive hypochondriac in the first-season episode of The Twilight Zone entitled "Escape Clause".

In 1960 and 1961, Christine guest-starred on episodes of Coronado 9, Rawhide, and The Untouchables. From 1961 to 1962, Christine had a recurring role as widow Ovie Swenson in the Western series Tales of Wells Fargo. She made four guest appearances on Perry Mason, including the role of defendant Beth Sandover in the season-six, 1962 episode, "The Case of the Double-Entry Mind", and murderer Edith Summers in the season-seven, 1963 episode, "The Case of the Devious Delinquent". For the remainder of the decade, she continued with guest-starring roles in such shows as 77 Sunset Strip, Ben Casey, Bonanza, The Fugitive, Hazel, Wagon Train playing the bereaved Mrs. Reed in S8E23 "The Katy Piper Story", The Virginian, The Big Valley, Going My Way, The F.B.I., and Daniel Boone. In 1969, Christine co-starred in the ABC television movie Daughter of the Mind.

Her greatest fame came in 1965 when she began her 21-year stint as the matronly Mrs. Olson, who had comforting words for young married couples while pouring Folgers coffee in television commercials. They became a popular staple on television, whereupon the character began to be parodied by comedians and entertainers, including Carol Burnett, Johnny Carson, Bob Hope, Ann-Margret, and Jackie Gleason. She went on to appear in over 100 commercials for Folgers. In 1971, Christine's hometown of Stanton, Iowa, honored her by transforming the city water tower to resemble a giant Swedish coffee pot.

During the 1970s, Christine continued to work primarily in television. Her last role was on the 1979 animated series Scooby-Doo and Scrappy-Doo, in which she provided additional voices.

=== Later years ===
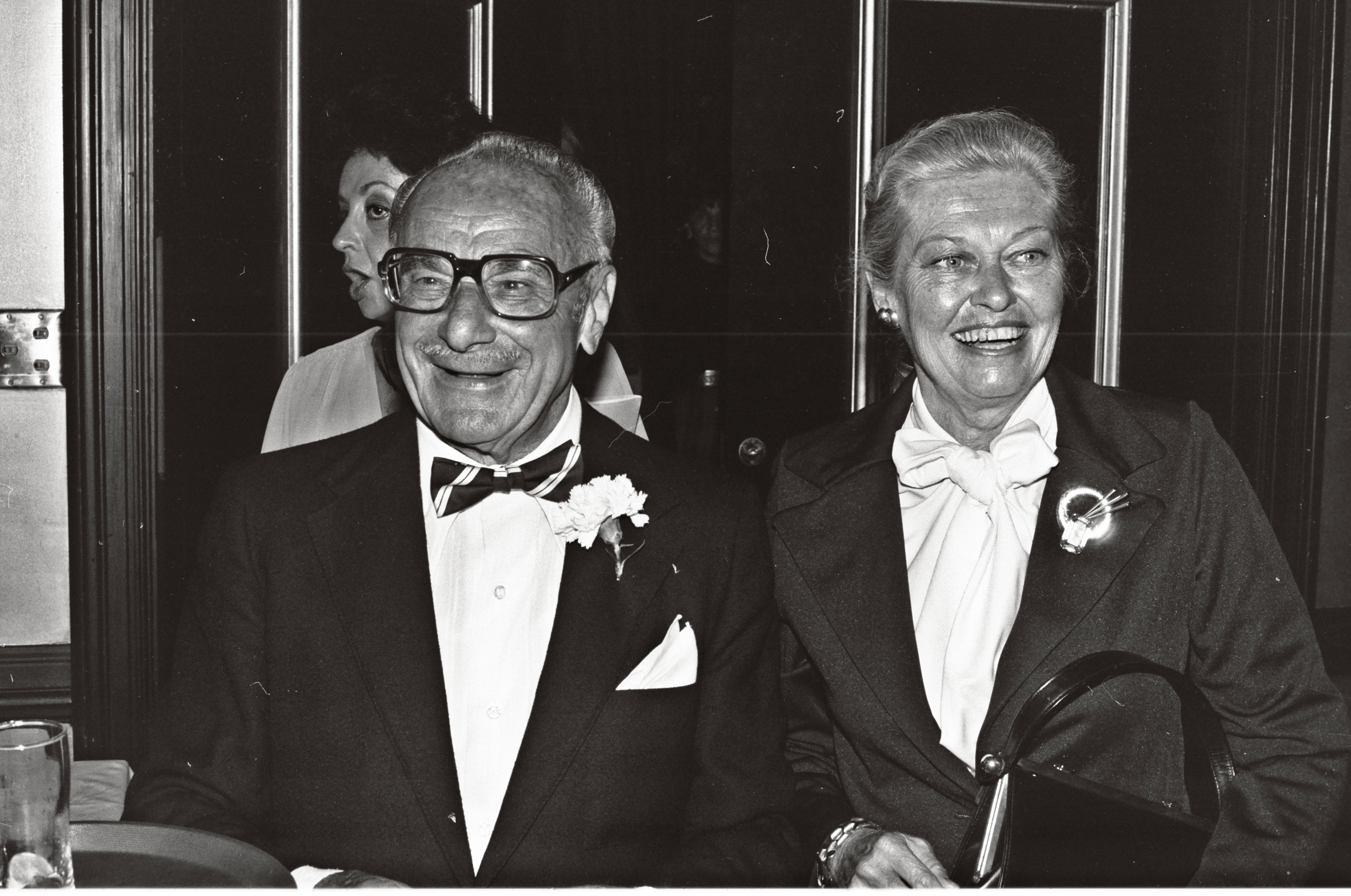
Christine, with her husband, Fritz Feld (1979)

Christine retired from acting in 1979. After her retirement, she did volunteer work at Planned Parenthood, and served as a judge at the American College Theatre Festival. She was later appointed the honorary mayor of Brentwood, Los Angeles, where her husband and she resided for many years.

== Personal life ==
In November 1940, Christine married character actor Fritz Feld. The couple had two sons, Steven and Danny. Christine and Feld remained married until his death in 1993.

== Death ==
On July 24, 1996, Christine died at her Brentwood home of cardiovascular disease. Her interment was at the Jewish Mount Sinai Memorial Park Cemetery in the Hollywood Hills section of Los Angeles.

== Filmography ==
Film
Year	Title	Role	Notes
1943	Truck Busters	Eadie Watkins	
1943	Edge of Darkness	Hulda	Uncredited
1943	Mission to Moscow	Maria - Beautician	Uncredited
1943	Action in the North Atlantic	Pebbles	Scenes deleted
1943	Women at War	Mary Sawyer	
1944	Raiders of Ghost City	Countess Elsa von Merck, alias Trina Dressard	Film serial
1944	The Old Texas Trail	Queenie Leone	
1944	The Mummy's Curse	Princess Ananka	
1945	Counter-Attack	Tanya	Uncredited
1945	Phantom of the Plains	Celeste	
1945	Girls of the Big House	Bernice Meyers	
1946	The Scarlet Horseman	Carla Marquette aka Matosca	Film serial
1946	Idea Girl	Evelina	
1946	Murder Is My Business	Dora Darnell	Alternative title: Occupation Murder
1946	House of Horrors	Lady of the Streets	
1946	The Wife of Monte Cristo		Uncredited
1946	The Inner Circle	Rhoda Roberts	
1946	The Killers	Lilly Harmon Lubinsky	
1946	The Mysterious Mr. Valentine	Lola Carson	
1947	The Invisible Wall	Mildred Elsworth	
1947	The Gangster	Mrs. Karty	Alternative title: Low Company
1948	Women in the Night	Claire Adams	Alternative titles: Curse of a Teenage Nazi; When Men Are Beasts
1948	Night Wind	Jean Benson	
1948	Cover Up	Margaret Baker	Alternative title: The Intruder
1949	Special Agent	Mabel Rumpler	
1950	The Men	Patient's Wife at Lecture	Uncredited; Alternative title: Battle Stripe
1950	Cyrano de Bergerac	Sister Marthe	
1952	The First Time	Nurse	Uncredited
1952	High Noon	Mrs. Simpson	Uncredited
1952	Women in the Night	Claire Adams	
1953	Never Wave at a WAC	Lt. Myles, Recruiting Officer	Uncredited
1953	Woman They Almost Lynched	Jenny	
1954	Dragnet	Mrs. Caldwell	Alternative title: The Original Dragnet
1955	The Cobweb	Sally	
1955	Not as a Stranger	Bruni	
1955	Good Morning, Miss Dove	Mrs. Rigsbee	Uncredited
1956	Invasion of the Body Snatchers	Wilma Lentz	
1956	The Killer Is Loose	Mary Gillespie	
1956	Nightmare	Mrs. Sue Bressard	
1956	Three Brave Men	Helen Goldsmith	
1957	The Spirit of St. Louis	Secretary	Uncredited
1957	Johnny Tremain	Mrs. Lapham	
1957	The Careless Years	Mathilda Vernon	
1960	Flaming Star	Mrs. Phillips	Uncredited
1961	Judgment at Nuremberg	Mrs. Halbestadt	
1962	Incident in an Alley	Mrs. Connell	
1963	Cattle King	Ruth Winters	Alternative title: Cattle King of Wyoming
1963	4 for Texas	Brunhilde - Elya Carlson's Maid	
1963	The Prize	Mrs. Bergh, Chaperon	
1964	One Man's Way	Anna Peale	
1964	The Killers	Miss Watson	
1965	A Rage to Live	Emma	
1966	Billy the Kid Versus Dracula	Eva Oster	
1967	Guess Who's Coming to Dinner	Hilary St. George	
1968	In Enemy Country	Frau Gulden	
1969	Hail, Hero!	Eleanor Murchiston	

Television
Year	Title	Role	Notes
1951	Front Page Detective	Beatrice Hillmane	Episode: "The Devil's Bible"
1952	Racket Squad		Episode: "The Phantom Bible"
1952	Personal Appearance Theater		Episode: "The Chair"
1952	Dangerous Assignment	Carla	Episode: "The Perfect Alibi"
1952–1953	The Abbott and Costello Show	Various roles	2 episodes
1952–1954	Dragnet	Various roles	4 episodes
1953	I'm the Law	Elliot	Episode: "The Model Agency Story"
1953–1954	Four Star Playhouse	Various roles	2 episodes
1954	Adventures of Superman	Mrs. Frank	Episode: "Lady in Black"
1954	The Whistler	Helen	Episode: "The Return"
1954–1956	The Ford Television Theatre	Various roles	2 episodes
1955	Studio 57	Jenny Pickett	Episode: "The Ballad of Jubal Pickett"
1955	Stage 7	Secretary	Episode: "The Press Conference"
1955	Soldiers of Fortune	Bonnie	Episode: "Run 'Till You Die"
1955	Alfred Hitchcock Presents	Model/Secretary	2 episodes
1956	Crusader		Episode: "Fear"
1956	The Star and the Story	Alice	Episode: "Arab Duel"
1956	Front Row Center	Various roles	2 episodes
1956	Private Secretary	Maud	Episode: "Elusive"
1956	Big Town		Episode: "Blackmail"
1956	Sneak Preview		Episode: "The Merry-Go-Round"
1956	Passport to Danger		Episode: "London"
1956	Science Fiction Theatre	Various roles	Episode: "The Human Experiment", "The Throwback"
1956	The Adventures of Jim Bowie	Katrina Gotshawk	Episode: "The Squatter"
1956	Cavalcade of America	Mrs. Sargent	Episode: "Innocent Bystander"
1956–1957	Matinee Theater	Various roles	2 episodes
1956–1958	Father Knows Best	Grace	2 episodes
1956–1959	General Electric Theater	Various roles	2 episodes
1957	Wire Service	Sigrid Jensen	Episode: "Profile of Ellen Gale"
1957	Hey, Jeannie!	Mrs. Warren	Episode: "Jeannie Plays Cupid"
1957	The Lone Ranger	Cecile Charron	Episode: "Canuck"
1957	Casey Jones	Doris Jones	Episode: "Storm Warning"
1957–1958	Trackdown	Various roles	2 episodes
1957–1959	State Trooper	Various roles	3 episodes
1957–1965	Gunsmoke	Various roles	2 episodes
1958	The Restless Gun	Amy Durant	Episode: "Strange Family in Town"
1958	Whirlybirds	Mrs. Thompson	Episode: "The Brothers"
1958	Mike Hammer	June Earl	Episode: "For Sale, Deathbed, Used"
1958	The Millionaire	Mrs. Barnett	Episode: "The Russ White Story"
1958	The Thin Man	Mildred	Episode: "The Valley Forger"
1958	Behind Closed Doors	Julie	Episode: "The Cape Canaveral Story"
1958	Peter Gunn	Nancy Davis	Episode: "The Vicious Dog"
1958	Dick Powell's Zane Grey Theatre	Mrs. Julie Hart	Episode: "The Scaffold"
1958	Buckskin	Miss Emily Pringle	Episode: "Miss Pringle"
1958	The Donna Reed Show	Margaret Lang	Episode: "The Baby Contest"
1958	The Life and Legend of Wyatt Earp	Martha Evans	Episode: "Plague Carrier"
1958–1960	Letter to Loretta	Various roles	3 episodes
1958–1963	Perry Mason	Various roles	4 episodes
1959	Rescue 8	Millie Wilde	Episode: "Flash Flood"
1959	Steve Canyon	Mary Moore	Episode: "The Bomb"
1959	The Lawless Years	Mrs. Pavlock	Episode: "The Immigrant"
1959	Frontier Doctor	Hester Gray, Stan's Sister	Episode: "The Twisted Road"
1959	Man Without a Gun		Episode: "Eye Witness"
1959	How to Marry a Millionaire	Alma Fergeson	Episode: "Love On Approval"
1959	Wanted: Dead or Alive	Various roles Harriet Meecham	2 episodes "The Matchmaker"
1959	The DuPont Show with June Allyson	Mother	Episode: "The Opening Door"
1959	The Twilight Zone	Ethel Bedeker	Episode: "Escape Clause"
1959	The Man from Blackhawk	Mary Schuler	Episode: "Death Is the Best Policy"
1959	The Rifleman	Woman on stagecoach	Episode: "The Spiked Rifle"
1960	M Squad	Mrs. Fassard	Episode: "The Twisted Way"
1960	Riverboat	Aunt Samantha Dexter	Episode: "The Treasure of Hawk Hill"
1960	Happy	Janice	Episode: "Charlie's First Love"
1960	Thriller	Marge	Episode: "The Twisted Image"
1960–1961	Coronado 9	Various roles	2 episodes
1960–1961	Rawhide	Sarah Tenney/Ada Covey	2 episodes
1960–1961	The Untouchables	Various roles	2 episodes
1960–1963	77 Sunset Strip	Various roles	2 episodes
1961	Maverick	Verna Lyme	Episode: "Last Stop: Oblivion"
1961	The Rifleman		1 episode
1961	Shirley Temple Theatre	Rebecca Baines	Episode: "Onawandah"
1961	The Deputy	Molly Baker	Episode: "Tension Point"
1961	This Is the Life	Sophia Szabo	Episode: "Song in the Night"
1961	The Asphalt Jungle	Miss Brandt	Episode: "The Sniper"
1961	Mister Ed	Margaret	Episode: "Little Boy"
1961–1962	Tales of Wells Fargo	Ovie Swenson	14 episodes
1961–1965	Wagon Train	Various roles	5 episodes
1962	The New Breed		Episode: "Hail, Hail, the Gang's All Here"
1962	Target: The Corruptors!	Lorraine	Episode: "A Book of Faces"
1962	Going My Way	Mrs. Randall	Episode: "The Parish Car"
1962	Stoney Burke	Flora Hill	Episode: "A Matter of Pride"
1962	The Eleventh Hour	Mrs. Drury	Episode: "My Name Is Judith, I'm Lost, You See"
1963–1964	Ben Casey	Various roles	2 episodes
1963–1964	Bonanza	Various roles	2 episodes
1963–1967	The Virginian	Various roles	4 episodes
1964	Mr. Novak	Mrs. Payne	Episode: "The Exile"
1964	Hazel	Mrs. McGuire	Episode: "Luncheon with the Governor"
1964–1965	The Fugitive	Various roles	2 episodes
1965	The Big Valley	Margaret Coleman	Episode: "The Young Marauders"
1966	Laredo	Agnes Halsey	Episode: "Sound of Terror"
1966	A Man Called Shenandoah	Fran Macauley	Episode: "Macauley's Cure"
1966	Jericho		Episode: "Long Journey Across a Short Street"
1966–1968	The F.B.I.	Various roles	3 episodes
1967	Felony Squad	Cleaning Woman	Episode: "The Deadly Partner"
1967	The Invaders	Mrs. Thorne	Episode: "Labyrinth"
1968–1970	Daniel Boone	Various roles	2 episodes
1969	Lancer	Hannah Sickles	Episode: "Child of Rock and Sunlight"
1969	Daughter of the Mind	Helga	Television movie
1970	Nanny and the Professor	Mrs. Wilson	Episode: "Nanny and the Smoke-Filled Room"
1970	The Old Man Who Cried Wolf	Miss Cummings	Television movie
1974	Ironside	Mrs. Hawkins	Episode: "Raise the Devil: Part 1"
1976	Woman of the Year	Alma	Television movie
1976	Kojak	Mrs. Yankowski	Episode: "By Silence Betrayed"
1979	Scooby-Doo and Scrappy-Doo	Additional voices	Unknown episodes
