= Harriette Merrifield Forbes =

American historian

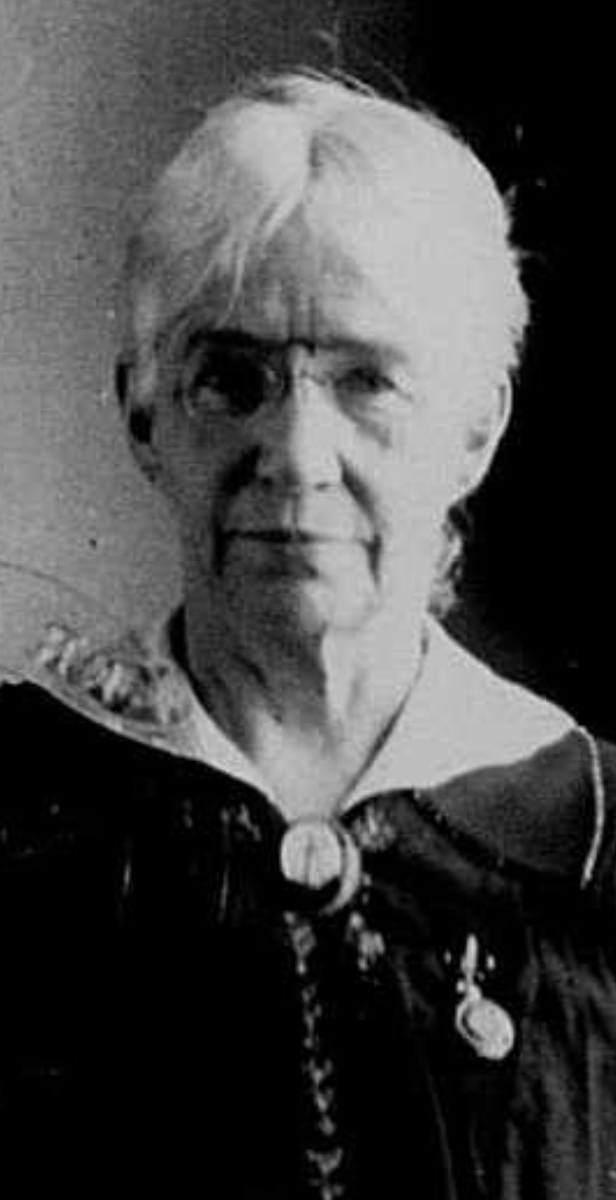
- Born: 22 October 1856; Worcester, Massachusetts, United States of America
- Died: 1951
- Occupation: Historian
- Notable work: Gravestones of Early New England and the Men Who Made Them (1927)

Harriette Merrifield Forbes (October 22, 1856 – 1951) was an American author, artist, gardener and botanical collector. She is considered the "Founding Mother" of gravestone studies.

== Biography ==
Harriette Merrifield Forbes was born as Hattie Merrifield on 22 October 1856 in Worcester, Massachusetts, United States of America. She married William Trowbridge Forbes (1850-1931), who taught mathematics at Robert College in Constantinople, and moved to USA to study law. He later became a judge in Worcester in 1888.

Forbes is widely recognized as a pioneering scholar in the study New England gravestone art. She authored the first definitive work on the subject, Gravestones of Early New England and the Men Who Made Them: 1653–1800, published in 1927. She photographed the early gravestones throughout central and eastern Massachusetts, even before the invention of the technically advanced “Brownie camera and flexible film”. Her work is considered "groundbreaking" since it became the basis for other research on this topic, most notably the work of Allan Ludwig.

Esther Forbes (1891-1967), author and antiquarian, was one of her daughters. Forbes “served as her daughter's most important researcher.”

She died in 1951.

== Works ==
Forbes's works include.

- The Hundredth Town: Glimpses of Life in Westborough 1717-1817 (1889)
- New England Diaries, 1602-1800: A Descriptive Catalogue of Diaries, Orderly Books and Sea Journals (1923)
- Gravestones of Early New England and the Men Who Made Them (1927)
