= Don Eitner =

American film and television actor

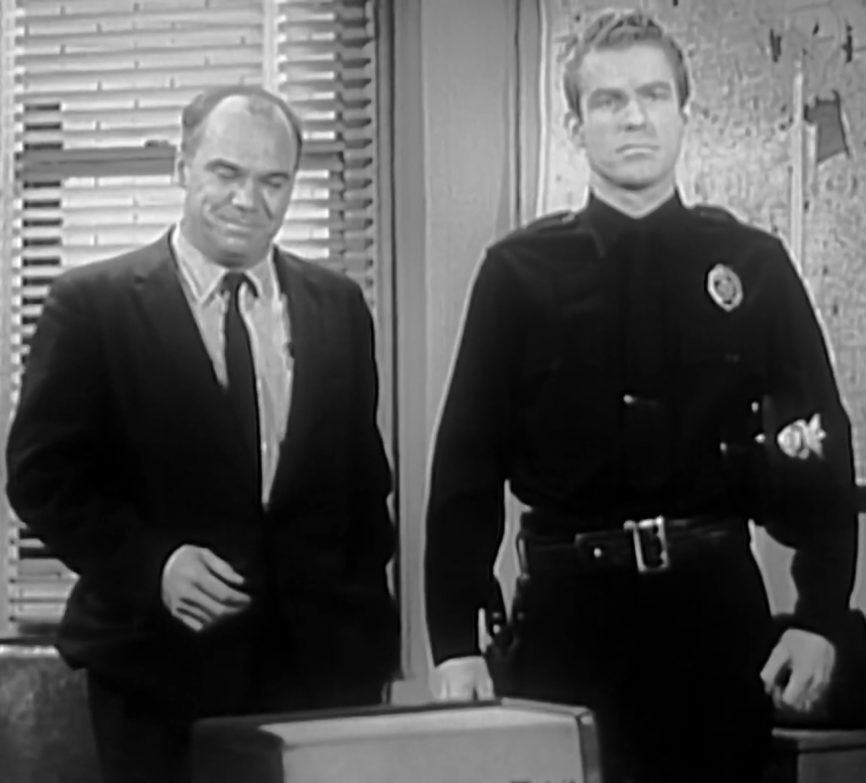
- Eitner (right) with John Doucette in Lock-Up, 1960
- Born: Donald Blaise Eitner; November 29, 1934; San Marino, California, U.S.
- Died: March 9, 2018 (aged 83); Burbank, California, U.S.
- Education: Loyola Marymount University
- Occupations: Film and television actor

Donald Blaise Eitner (November 29, 1934 – March 9, 2018) was an American film and television actor. He was known for playing Corporal Dixon in the American western television series Mackenzie's Raiders.

== Life and career ==
Eitner was born in San Marino, California, the son of Adolph and Irma Eitner. He attended Loyola Marymount University, studying economics. After completing his education, he served in the United States Air Force, and worked as an artistic director. He began his screen career in 1956, appearing in the syndicated anthology television series Science Fiction Theatre. In the same year, he appeared in the television programs The Man Called X and The West Point Story.

Later in his career, in 1959, Eitner starred as Corporal Dixon in the syndicated western television series Mackenzie's Raiders, starring along with Richard Carlson. He guest-starred in numerous television programs including The Bob Hope Theater, The Virginian, Star Trek: The Original Series, Bronco, Bat Masterson, Death Valley Days, Tombstone Territory, 12 O’Clock High, Columbo and The Rockford Files, and played the recurring role of Dr. Richard Winfield in the ABC soap opera television series Dynasty. He also appeared in films such as Queen of Blood, The Mad Bomber, Kronos and This Rebel Breed. Aside from his screen career, he was also a stage actor and founded the theater company American Theatre Arts in Los Angeles, California.

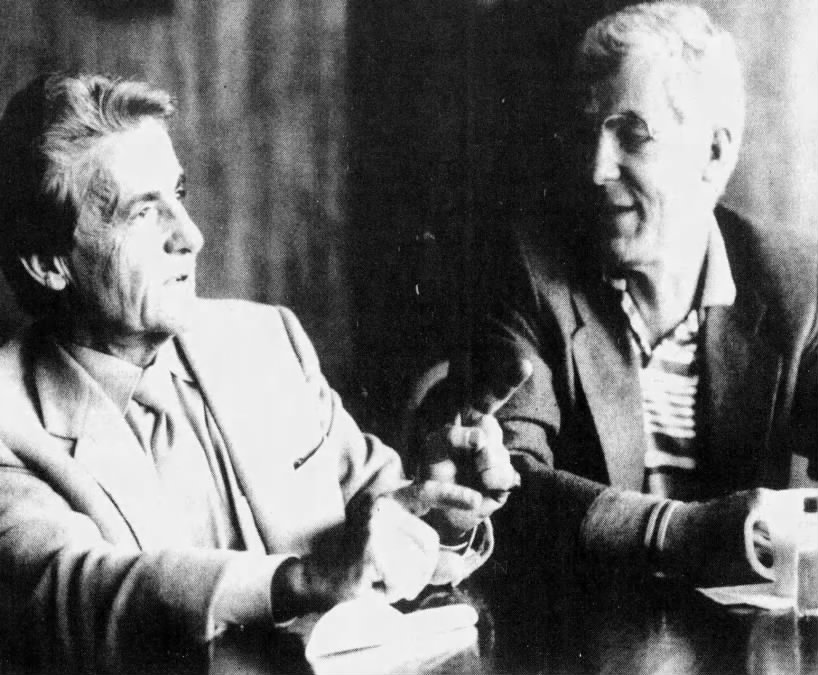
Eitner (right) with Tom Troupe, 1986

Eitner retired from acting in 1985, last appearing in the television film International Airport.

== Death ==
Eitner died on March 9, 2018, in Burbank, California, at the age of 83.
