= So Dark the Night =

1946 film by Joseph H. Lewis

- Theatrical release poster
- Directed by: Joseph H. Lewis
- Screenplay by: Dwight V. Babcock; Martin Berkeley
- Story by: Aubrey Wisberg
- Produced by: Ted Richmond
- Starring: Steven Geray; Micheline Cheirel; Eugene Borden
- Cinematography: Burnett Guffey
- Edited by: Jerome Thoms
- Music by: Hugo Friedhofer
- Production company: Columbia Pictures
- Distributed by: Columbia Pictures
- Release date: October 10, 1946
- Running time: 70 minutes
- Country: United States
- Language: English

So Dark the Night is a 1946 American crime film with film noir influences featuring Steven Geray, Micheline Cheirel and Eugene Borden. Based on a story written by Aubrey Wisberg, the screenplay was written by Dwight V. Babcock and Martin Berkeley, and directed by Joseph H. Lewis.

== Plot ==
A Parisian detective, Henri Cassin (Steven Geray), falls in love with country innkeeper Pierre Michaud's daughter Nanette (Micheline Cheirel) while on a long overdue vacation. She is a simple girl with a jealous boyfriend, Leon (Paul Marion). Nonetheless, the detective becomes engaged to her. On the night of their engagement party, the girl vanishes and later turns up dead. Cassin believes that the obvious suspect is Leon, but soon he is also found killed. Soon after Nanette's mother (Ann Codee) receives a warning that she will be the next to die, then is found strangled.

Pierre, fearing for his safety, decides to sell the inn. Henri returns to Paris, and using his investigative skill produces a rendering of the killer.

To Henri's astonishment, the sketch is of himself. When he fits his shoe into the footprint, he realizes he is the murderer. After making a full confession to the police commissioner, Henri is evaluated by a psychiatrist, who determines that he has schizophrenia. Though placed under watch of a guard, Henri escapes back to St. Margot, where he tries to strangle Pierre. The police commissioner, who has followed the detective to the village, catches him in the act and shoots him dead.

== Cast ==
- Steven Geray as Henri Cassin
- Micheline Cheirel as Nanette Michaud
- Eugene Borden as Pierre Michaud
- Ann Codee as Mama Michaud
- Egon Brecher as Dr. Boncourt
- Helen Freeman as Widow Bridelle

== Critical reception ==
At the time of its release the staff at Variety magazine gave the film a positive review, writing, "Around the frail structure of a story [by Aubrey Wisberg] about a schizophrenic Paris police inspector who becomes an insane killer at night, a tight combination of direction, camerawork and musical scoring produce a series of isolated visual effects that are subtle and moving to an unusual degree."

Writing in the 1979 critical anthology, Film Noir: An Encyclopedic Reference to the American Style, film historian Blake Lucas praised So Dark the Night and director Joseph H. Lewis for "his ability to infuse a pastoral setting with maudit elements. More importantly, Lewis forced cinematographer Burnett Guffey into an uncharacteristic visual style utilizing an unusual range of deep blacks, depth staging and shooting through windows, to lend the necessary expressionistic touch."

Foster Hirsch's 1981 Film Noir: The Dark Side of the Screen lists So Dark the Night as a seminal '40s film noir and chracterizes it as "an ideal example of the opportunities for visual expressiveness noir offers."

In 2003 the critic Dennis Schwartz lauded the film, writing:

This is Joseph H. Lewis's second feature and one that has the same intense energy as his The Big Combo (1955) and My Name is Julia Ross (1945). The Freudian story is wacky and strains credibility, but the elegant style Lewis uses is mesmerizing. The film noir's light touches are magnificently caught in the rich depiction of rural life and the character study of a psychological breakdown due to a pressured psyche that induces schizophrenia. This makes for a fascinating watch. So Dark the Night is a rarely shown obscure film, and it is a beauty. Burnett Guffey used his camera effectively in many strange angled shots while his dark black shadings express the contrasting somber mood to the airy country landscape.

Leonard Maltin gave the film two-and-a-half stars (out of four), and called it an "impressively made B movie, something of a sleeper in its time, (that) suffers only from a lack of charisma on the part of its (mostly unknown) cast.

The film was released on Blu-ray in 2019 by Arrow Films in the UK and Eire.
