= William Rowland (film director) =

American film director

- Born: September 10, 1898; Philadelphia, Pennsylvania, United States
- Died: February 14, 1983 (aged 84); United States
- Occupations: Director, producer, screenwriter
- Years active: 1932–1989 (film)

William Rowland (September 10, 1898 – February 14, 1983) was an American film director, producer and screenwriter. He was involved in the production of several Spanish-language films.

== Selected filmography ==
- Moonlight and Pretzels (1933)
- Take a Chance (1933)
- Sweet Surrender (1935)
- In Paris, A.W.O.L. (1936)
- Stardust (1938)
- Follies Girl (1943)
- A Song for Miss Julie (1945)
- Flight to Nowhere (1946)
- Women in the Night (1948)
- This Rebel Breed (1960)
- The Wild Scene (1970)

== Bibliography ==
- Bradley, Edwin M. Unsung Hollywood Musicals of the Golden Era: 50 Overlooked Films and Their Stars, 1929–1939. McFarland, 2016.
- De las Carreras, María Elena & Horak, Jan-Christopher. Hollywood Goes Latin: Spanish-Language Cinema in Los Angeles. Indiana University Press, 2019.
- Groppa, Carlos G. The Tango in the United States: A History. McFarland, 2018.
