= Dora Nelson (1939 film) =

1939 film

- Directed by: Mario Soldati
- Written by: Louis Verneuil (play); Luigi Zampa; Mario Soldati
- Starring: Assia Noris; Carlo Ninchi; Luigi Cimara; Nino Crisman
- Cinematography: Anchise Brizzi
- Edited by: Giovanna Del Bosco
- Music by: Felice Montagnini
- Production company: Industrie Cinematografiche Italiane
- Distributed by: Industrie Cinematografiche Italiane
- Release date: December 1939
- Running time: 78 minutes
- Country: Italy
- Language: Italian

Dora Nelson is a 1939 Italian comedy film directed by Mario Soldati and starring Assia Noris, Carlo Ninchi and Luigi Cimara. It is a remake of the 1935 French film of the same title, which was based on a play by Louis Verneuil. The film was shot at Cinecittà in Rome, with several real employees of the studio appearing as themselves. It belongs to the movies of the calligrafismo style.

== Synopsis ==
A headstrong diva abandons the set of her latest film, and heads of to Cannes. A working class girl who strongly resembles the star takes her place so that the film can be finished.

== Partial cast ==
- Assia Noris as Dora Nelson / Pierina Costa
- Carlo Ninchi as Giovanni Ferrari
- Luigi Cimara as Alberto, il primo marito
- Nino Crisman as Il falso principe
- Carlo Campanini as Emilio, l'ottico
- Miretta Mauri as Renata
- Federico Collino as Blasco, il segretario
- Olinto Cristina as Il signor Gabardo
- Evelina Paoli as La signora Gabardo
- Adele Mosso as La zia anziana di Gabardo
- Massimo Girotti as Enrico

== Bibliography ==
- Gundle, Stephen. Mussolini's Dream Factory: Film Stardom in Fascist Italy. Berghahn Books, 2013.
