= Dora Nelson (1935 film) =

1935 film

- Directed by: René Guissart
- Written by: Louis Verneuil (play)
- Starring: Elvira Popescu; André Lefaur; Frédéric Duvallès; Micheline Cheirel
- Cinematography: Enzo Riccioni
- Music by: Armand Bernard
- Production company: Flores Film
- Distributed by: Paramount Pictures
- Release date: 8 November 1935
- Running time: 95 minutes
- Country: France
- Language: French

Dora Nelson is a 1935 French comedy film directed by René Guissart and starring Elvira Popescu, André Lefaur and Frédéric Duvallès. The film was based on a play by Louis Verneuil. In 1939 it was remade as an Italian film of the same title.

== Synopsis ==
A leading film star abandons the picture she is working on, and elopes with her lover to Italy. The desperate filmmakers recruit a poor woman who strongly resembles her to take her place.

== Partial cast ==
- Elvira Popescu as Dora Nelson et Suzanne Verdier
- André Lefaur as Philippe de Moreuil
- Frédéric Duvallès as Étienne Beaupertuis
- Micheline Cheirel as Yvonne de Moreuil
- Julien Carette as Fouchard
- Paule Andral as Madame de Chantalard
- Annie Carriel as Madame d'Aubigny
- Jenny Burnay as Elsa
- Andrée Champeaux as Célestine
- Clara d'Arc as Huguette

== Bibliography ==
- Gundle, Stephen. Mussolini's Dream Factory: Film Stardom in Fascist Italy. Berghahn Books, 2013.
