= Women in the Night =

1948 film by William Rowland

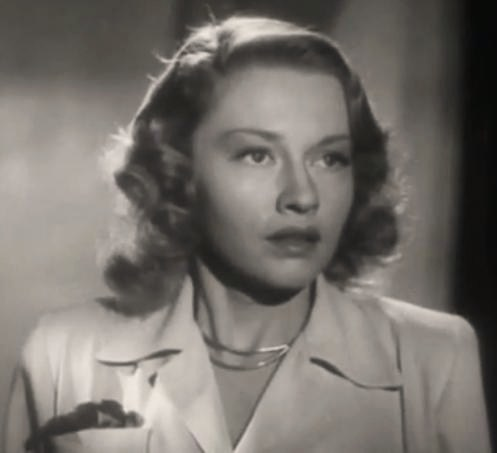
- Virginia Christine in the film
- Directed by: William Rowland
- Written by: Gyles Adams; Louis K. Ansell; Maude Emily Glass; Arthur V. Jones
- Screenplay by: Robert St. Claire; Edwin V. Westrate; Ali Ipar
- Story by: William Rowland
- Produced by: Joseph C. Ansell; Louis K. Ansell
- Starring: See below
- Cinematography: José Ortiz Ramos; Eugen Schüfftan
- Edited by: Dan Milner
- Music by: Raúl Lavista
- Distributed by: Film Classics, Inc
- Release date: January 2, 1948
- Running time: 92 minutes (cut version); 98 minutes (UK restored version)
- Country: United States
- Languages: English; French

Women in the Night is a 1948 American film directed by William Rowland shot in Mexico. The film is also known as When Men Are Beasts. The film depicts activities of German and Japanese who wish revenge on the Allies with a cosmic ray weapon.

== Plot ==
The film is set in 1945 after the defeat of Germany in World War II, the film tells the story of an international group of women being held prisoners in a Shanghai hospital that is also an officers' club for the German military. The Allied Forces are still at war with Japan, the a German officer at the hospital/officer's club awaits a cosmic ray weapon from Japanese scientists which is a hundred times more powerful than an atomic bomb.

== Location ==
The film was set in Shanghai, China at the end of World War II and was filmed at the Playa Ensenada Hotel in Ensenada, Baja California, Mexico.

== Cast ==
- Tala Birell as Yvette Aubert
- William Henry as Major Von Arnheim
- Richard Loo as Colonel Noyama
- Virginia Christine as Claire Adams
- Bernadene Hayes as Frau Thaler
- Gordon Richards as Colonel Von Meyer
- Frances Chung as Li Ling
- Jean Brooks as Maya
- Kathy Frye as Helen James
- Helen Mowery as Sheila Hallett
- Benson Fong as Chang
- Helen Brown as Mrs. Angela James
- Frederick Giermann as Major Eisel
- Philip Ahn as Professor Kunioshi
- Arno Frey as Field Marshal Von Runzel
- Beal Wong as General Mitikoya
- Iris Flores as Maria Gonzales
- Frederic Brunn as Lieutenant Kraus
- Harry Hays Morgan as General Hundman
- Paula Allen as Nurse
- Joy Gwynell as Suicide Girl
- William Yetter Sr. as German Officer
- Noel Cravat as Japanese Officer
- Wolfgang Zilzer as German Doctor

== Home media ==
The film was released on DVD April 19, 2005.
