= Johnny Tremain =

1943 American historic novel by Esther Forbes

- First edition (US)
- Author: Esther Forbes
- Illustrator: Lynd Ward
- Language: English
- Genre: Historical novel
- Publisher: Houghton Mifflin (US); Chatto & Windus (UK)
- Publication date: 1943 (US), 1944 (UK)
- Publication place: United States
- Media type: Print (hardback & paperback)
- ISBN: 0-440-44250-8
- OCLC: 21002210
- LC Class: MLCS 2006/43879 (P)

Johnny Tremain is a work of historical fiction written in 1943 by Esther Forbes that is set in Boston prior to and during the outbreak of the American Revolution. Intended for teen-aged readers, the novel's themes include apprenticeship, courtship, sacrifice, human rights, and the growing tension between Patriots and Loyalists as conflict nears. Events depicted in the novel include the Boston Tea Party, the British blockade of the Port of Boston, the midnight ride of Paul Revere, and the Battles of Lexington and Concord.

The book won the 1944 Newbery Medal and was believed to be "among the 20 best-selling children's books of the 20th century." It was estimated to be the 16th-bestselling children's paperback book as of the year 2001 in the United States, according to Publishers Weekly. In 1957, Walt Disney Pictures released a film adaptation, also called Johnny Tremain.

== Plot summary ==
Johnny Tremain is a promising but prideful 14-year-old silversmith apprentice at the Boston silversmith shop of elderly Ephraim Lapham. The date is July 23, 1773. It is understood that someday Johnny will marry Mr. Lapham's granddaughter Priscilla (Cilla) to keep the shop within the Lapham family. The shop receives a challenging and urgent order from wealthy merchant John Hancock to make a silver dish to replace one that Mr. Lapham fashioned decades before. While preparing Hancock's order, Johnny's hand is badly burned when Dove, another apprentice resentful of Johnny, deliberately gives him a cracked crucible that leaks molten silver. Johnny's hand is burned and crippled beyond use, and he can no longer be a silversmith or do most things. Johnny's youthful pride is crushed by the injury. He is relegated to work as an unskilled errand boy. He goes to find a new job that will accept his crippled hand.

After a series of rejections, Johnny reaches the low point of his young life. While searching for jobs, he encounters in a printshop Rab Silsbee, a young typesetter who is friendly to him. He then decides to turn to Mr. Lyte, a wealthy Boston merchant. Johnny explains that his mother told him that he and Mr. Lyte are related and as a last resort, to turn to him for help. Lyte requests the proof, and Johnny shows him a silver cup with the Lyte family's crest. Lyte says it was stolen from him in a burglary, and Johnny is accused of the theft and arrested. Eventually, Johnny is freed by the court after Rab brings Cilla to court and she testifies that Johnny showed her his cup before the burglary ever took place.

Johnny settles into a job delivering a weekly newspaper, the Boston Observer. The Observer is a Whig publication, and Johnny is introduced to the larger world of pre-revolutionary Boston politics by Rab. Johnny learns to ride and care for Goblin, a beautiful but skittish horse used to make deliveries. He moves in with Rab in the attic of the newspaper's shop.

As months pass and tension between Whigs and Tories rises, Johnny becomes a dedicated Whig. He matures and re-evaluates many personal relationships, including that with Cilla, who becomes a trusted friend and fellow Whig. Johnny and Rab participate in the Boston Tea Party, in which patriot colonists throw a shipload of tea into the harbor rather than allow the ship's owner to unload the tea and pay a tax imposed by Parliament without the consent of the people of Britain's American colonies. In retaliation, Britain sends troops to occupy Boston and closes the port, inflicting hardship upon the inhabitants of this commercial and trading town. Rab decides to leave the Observer and become a soldier, taking with him a musket that Johnny acquired for him. At the end of the book, Johnny meets and talks briefly with his friend one last time: Facing the British, Rab has been mortally wounded in battle. No longer needing the musket, Rab returns it to Johnny with a stoic smile. A Patriot doctor offers to perform surgery to fix Johnny's hand so he can fight against the British, and the story ends with Johnny's acceptance of the offer.

== In popular culture ==
Family Guy references this novel, specifically Johnny Tremain by name, in a seldomly caught reference.

In "Whacking Day", an episode from season 4 of The Simpsons, Bart Simpson reads Johnny Tremain and loves it.

== Reception ==
Kirkus Reviews wrote, "This is delightful reading, but at the close it seems to leave less sense of substance and permanence than her best work (Paradise and Paul Revere), but to me it was more satisfying than The General's Lady or Mirror for Witches." Common Sense Media said that "this sweeping tale of redcoats and revolutionaries has a lot to offer" and remarked, "Forbes, a historian, writes with detail and precision, imbuing historical events with life and passion that is often lacking in textbooks."

== Similar characters in other media ==
Another Johnny Tremaine (note the different spelling of the surname) was a different fictional character played by Rod Cameron in the 1949 Republic Pictures film Brimstone, written by Thames Williamson and Norman S. Hall. This second Tremaine was a U.S. Marshal who goes undercover to stop a cattle-smuggling ring. The release of Brimstone followed the awarding of the Newbery prize to the novel Johnny Tremain, but preceded the release of the 1957 film Johnny Tremain by Disney.

== See also ==
- List of films about the American Revolution
- List of television series and miniseries about the American Revolution

Awards
Preceded by Adam of the Road	Newbery Medal recipient 1943	Succeeded by Rabbit Hill
