= Esther Forbes =

American novelist (1891–1967)

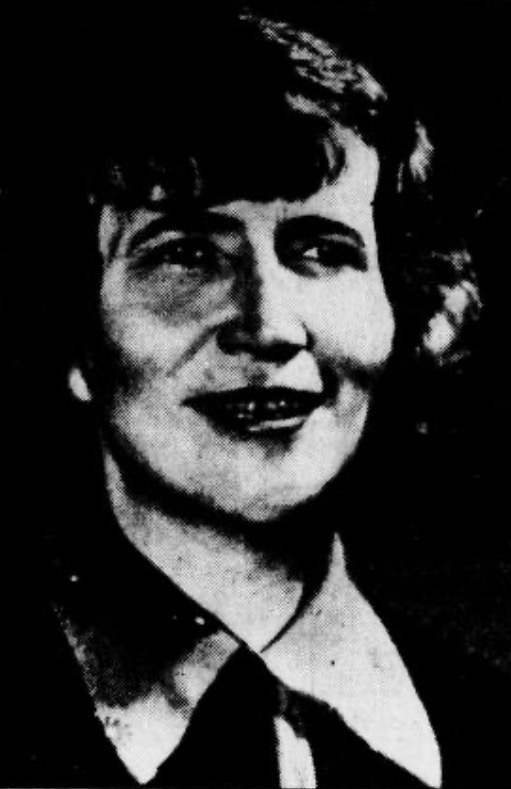
- Born: Esther Louise Forbes; June 28, 1891; Westborough, Massachusetts, U.S.
- Died: August 12, 1967 (aged 76); Worcester, Massachusetts, U.S.
- Education: Bradford College
- Occupation: Writer
- Spouse: Albert Hoskins (1926–1933)
- Writing career
- Period: 1926–1954
- Genres: Children's historical novels; biography
- Notable works: Paul Revere and the World He Lived In; Johnny Tremain: A Novel for Young and Adult

Esther Louise Forbes (/fɔːrbz/; June 28, 1891 – August 12, 1967) was an American novelist, historian, and children's writer who received the Pulitzer Prize and the Newbery Medal. She was the first woman elected to membership in the American Antiquarian Society.

== Early life and education ==
Forbes was born on June 28, 1891, in Westborough, Massachusetts, the daughter of William Trowbridge Forbes and historian Harriette Merrifield Forbes. She moved with her family to Worcester, Massachusetts, in 1898. She attended Bancroft School in Worcester, and, from 1909 to 1912, she attended Bradford Academy, a junior college in Bradford, Massachusetts.

In 1916, Forbes joined her older sisters Cornelia and Katherine in Madison, Wisconsin, where Cornelia was in graduate school and Katharine was teaching. During this time she attended the classes at the University of Wisconsin.

== Career ==
While in Wisconsin, Forbes joined the editorial board of the Wisconsin Literary Magazine, alongside another future Pulitzer Prize winner, Marjorie Kinnan Rawlings. In 1919, she returned to Worcester. In late December she began working for the editorial department of Houghton Mifflin Company in Boston. From 1924 to 1926, she wrote feature articles for the Boston Evening Transcript.

On January 14, 1926, Forbes married attorney Albert L. Hoskins Jr., and left Houghton Mifflin. The couple moved to New York City. Her first novel, O Genteel Lady! was published in 1926 and was selected as the second book for the Book of the Month Club. In 1928 A Mirror for Witches was published. In 1933, she and Albert Hoskins divorced. Although she retained her married name, she wrote under her maiden name, Esther Forbes.

Forbes returned to Worcester in 1933, where she lived with her mother and unmarried siblings. At this time, her mother began working closely with Forbes on the research for her novels, often at the local research library, the American Antiquarian Society.

In 1935, Miss Marvel, in 1937 Paradise and in 1938, The General's Lady were published. Each of these were historical novels set in New England from colonial times through the early years of the Republic. In a break from her fiction, Forbes wrote a definitive biography of Paul Revere, Paul Revere and the World He Lived In (1942), for which she received the 1943 Pulitzer Prize for History. Also in 1943, she received an honorary Doctor of Letters degree from Clark University.

In 1943, Forbes' best-known work Johnny Tremain was published, for which she received the Newbery Award in 1944. In 1946, America's Paul Revere was published and in 1947, The Boston Book was published.

In 1947, Forbes received the Metro-Goldwyn-Mayer novel award of $150,000 for her then forthcoming book, The Running of the Tide, published in 1948. In 1949, she was elected a Fellow of the American Academy of Arts and Sciences. Rainbow on the Road was published in 1954. In 1960, Esther Forbes became the first woman elected to membership in the American Antiquarian Society.

== Death ==
Forbes died on August 12, 1967, aged 76, in Worcester, of rheumatic heart disease. Her manuscripts were donated to Clark University in Worcester. The royalties for her historical novels were donated to the American Antiquarian Society, which also has the research notes on her unfinished work on witchcraft in early New England.

== Works ==
- O Genteel Lady! (1926)
- A Mirror for Witches (1928)
- Miss Marvel (1935 historical about a Worcester family)
- Paradise (1937)
- The General's Lady (1938 historical novel about Bathsheba Spooner)
- Paul Revere and the World He Lived In (1942 biography)
- Johnny Tremain (1943 YA novel)
- The Boston Book (1947 pictorial essay)
- America's Paul Revere (1948 pictorial essay)
- The Running of the Tide (1948)
- Rainbow on the Road (1954)
