= The Block NZ season 10 =

New Zealand reality television

The Block NZ
- Season 10
- No. of episodes: 37

Release
- Original network: Three
- Original release: 18 July – 9 October 2022

Season chronology
- ← Previous; Season 9

The tenth and final season of New Zealand reality television series The Block NZ, titled The Block NZ: Redemption, premiered on 18 July 2022. It is set in the Auckland suburb of Orewa.

The judges are Shelley Ferguson and Jason Bonham. The host is Mark Richardson and the site foreman is Peter Wolfkamp.

== Contestants ==
This season saw the return of four former teams from past seasons of The Block NZ.

House	Couple (ages)	Relationship	Hometown	Previous season
1	Quinn Alexandre (34) & Ben Alexandre (38)	Married	Christchurch	Season 3
2	Chloe Hes (29) & Ben Speedy (28)	Friends	Palmerston North & Auckland	Season 7
3	Maree Steele (35) & James Steele (36)	Married	South Auckland	Season 3
4	Stacy Middleton (28) & Adam Middleton (28)	Married	Wellington	Season 8

== Score history ==
=== Room reveal scores ===
Teams' progress through the competition
		Teams			
		Quinn and Ben	Chloe and Ben	Maree and James	Stacy & Adam
Week	Area(s)	Scores			
1	Guest Bedroom	12	14.5	12	16
2	Kids Bedroom	15.5	18	15	12.5
3	Family Bathroom	16.5	20	18.5	18
4	Study / Sitting Room	10	17.5	7	14.5
5	Living Room	12.5	17.5	16	17.5
6	Master Bedroom + EnSuite + WIR	16	13.5	17.5	16
7	Garage + Laundry	13	10.5	12.5	14.5
8	Kitchen + Dining + Entry	15	6	14	13.5
9	Redemption Week	16	15	14.5	16.5
10	Stairs and Powder Room	12	16	13.5	16
11	Outdoor's Week	11.5	17	14.5	16
12	Best House Week	14	17	15.5	15.5

Colour key:
Highest Score
Lowest Score

=== Team judging scores ===
		Teams			
		Stacy and Adam	Quinn and Ben	Maree and James	Chloe and Ben
Week	Area(s)	Scores			
2	Kids Bedroom	21.5	20.5	22.5	23
3	Family Bathroom	24	23	23.5	15
6	Master Bedroom + En Suite + WIR	21.5	15	14	14
8	Kitchen + Dining + Entry	23	17	18	13.5
10	Stairs and Powder Room	10.5	9	15	13
11	Outdoor Week	13	17	18	24

Teams did not judge each other's:

- Guest bedrooms.
- Sitting Rooms/Study's
- Living Room
- Garage and Laundry
- Redemption Week
- Best House Week

Colourkey:
Highest Score
Lowest Score

=== Challenge results ===
Week	Challenge	Prize	Winner
1	Slingshot mud challenge	Decide which house each team is renovating	Chloe and Ben
1	Mark portraits	$12,000 Samsung kitchen upgrade	Chloe and Ben
2	Slip'n'slide Block Trivia	$5,000 Tile Depot credit	Quinn and Ben
2	Stump Bowling	Extra $1,000 kid's bedroom budget restriction and a Minus 1	Stacy and Adam
3	Team Communication test	$4,000 art from Pop Motif and a Plus 1	Maree and James
3	Plank Walk	$5000 additional budget at NOOD and an additional $5000 cash if they beat the block record.	Maree and James
4	Samsung Leaky Pipe Challenge	Samsung entertainment upgrade worth more than $13,000	Chloe and Ben
4	Block Scrabble	45s time advantage in any challenge and mystery envelope (Undo)	Quinn and Ben
5	Demolition Challenge	$5000 Cash and $4000 Kings Plant Barn budget	Quinn and Ben
5	Wheelie Bin Game Changer	30 tools down extension for Friday and mystery envelope (Deflect)	Stacy and Adam
6	Block Stars Poetry Slam	$10,000 towards their budget	Quinn and Ben
6	What's in the box?	$2,000 from another teams budget and mystery envelope (Minus 1)	Quinn and Ben
7	Resene Paint me a Picture	Resene Ecodecorator to the value of $10,000 and the winning teams charity gets $1000 cash and $1000 Resene voucher	Stacey and Adam (Key Sar Rescue South Auckland)
7	Buy your Time	1 Hour of Labour from another Team	Stacey and Adam
8	Suzuki Relay Race	$5,000 cash courtesy of Suzuki	Quinn and Ben
8	Wasabi Roulette	$5,000 and a mystery envelope (Minus 1)	Quinn and Ben
9	Starbucks at Home	$5,000 towards their budget	Chloe and Ben
9	The great chair escape	Secret Envelope (Plus 1) for themselves and a second envelope (Minus 1) to gift to another team (Maree and James)	Adam and Ribz
10	Beach Obstacle Scrabble	$5,000 towards their budget	Chloe and Ben
10	Shade7 Task Master	Shade7 umbrella up to the value of $5,000 and a Secret Envelope (Minus 1)	Chloe and Ben
11	Blower Football	$1,000 from another team and a Secret Envelope (Minus 1)	Quinn and Ben
11	Blindfold Tool arena	$5,000 towards their budget	Stacey and Adam
12	Nosey Neighbours	$5,000 Cash and Auction order decision	Stacey and Adam

== Auction results ==
House	Auction Spot	Team	Reserve	Auction Result	Profit	Total Winnings	Placing spot
1	2nd	Quinn & Ben	$1.199m	Passed in	$0	$0	3rd=
2	4th	Chloe & Ben	$1.141m	$1,145,000	$4000	$104,000	1st
3	3rd	Maree & James	$1.152m	$1,152,100	$100	$100	2nd
4	1st	Stacy & Adam	$1.148m	Passed in	$0	$0	3rd=
