= House Rules =

House Rules may refer to:

- House rules, rules applying only in a certain location or organization
- House Rules (novel), a 2010 novel by Jodi Picoult
- House Rules (1988 TV series), an Australian television series
- House Rules (1998 TV series), an American sitcom
- House Rules (2003 TV series), an American television show hosted by Mark L. Walberg
- House Rules (2013 TV series), an Australian competitive renovation game show
  - House Rules NZ, a 2023 New Zealand version of the Australian series
- House Rules (mixtape), a 2014 mixtape by Slaughterhouse
- "House Rules" (NCIS), a 2014 TV episode
- United States House Committee on Rules
