= The Block NZ season 9 =

Season of television series

The Block NZ
- Season 9
- No. of episodes: 48

Release
- Original network: Three
- Original release: 14 June – 14 November 2021

Season chronology
- ← Previous; Season 8 Next → Season 10

The ninth season of New Zealand reality television series The Block NZ premiered on 14 June 2021. It is set in the Auckland suburb of Point Chevalier.

The judges are Chris Stevens, Ann-Louise Hyde, and Lauren Mirabito. The hosts are Mark Richardson and former judge Shelly Ferguson and the site foreman is Peter Wolfkamp.

The winning team won $100,000 on top of their auction profit.

== Production ==
In December 2019, a casting call was sent out looking for four new teams. Production for this season began in January 2020 on Huia Road in Point Chevalier with four two-storey townhouses being constructed. However, due to the COVID-19 pandemic and restrictions put in place, the season was postponed until 2021, with production pausing on 23 March 2020, at the start of the third week, and resuming on 19 April 2021.

== Contestants ==
The teams selected for this season are as follows. Connie replaced Janah Kingi as Rachel's teammate in week 3 when production resumed after it was suspended due to the COVID-19 pandemic. When Keegan's ribs were fractured during a challenge in week 7, the brother's sister Maddy Crawford temporarily joined Team Yellow to allow time for Keegan to heal.

House	Couple (ages)	Relationship	Hometown
1	Connie King (40) & Rachel Martin (42)	Friends	Palmerston North & Papamoa
2	Meg Leen (38) & Dan Leen (46)	Married	Rangiora
3	Dylan Crawford (30) & Keegan Crawford (25)	Brothers	Greymouth
4	Tim Cotton (26) & Arthur Gillies (26)	Best friends	Auckland

== Score history ==
=== Room reveal scores ===
Teams' progress through the competition
		Teams			
		Connie & Rachel	Meg & Dan	Dylan & Keegan	Tim & Arthur
Week	Area(s)	Scores (cash spend)			
1 (Note: Teams needed to spend less than $10,000 cash on their guest bedrooms, but their actual cash spend was never revealed.)	Guest Bedroom	24.5 (<$10k)	25.5 (<$10k)	23.5 (<$10k)	14.5 (<$10k)
2 (Note: Only Ann-Louise and Lauren judged the rooms; Chris was self-isolating due to having cold symptoms.)	Kids Bedroom	15.5 ($17,886.33)	13.5 ($24,229.71) (Note: Meg & Dan also completed a second kids bedroom this week, but only one was presented for judging.)	12 ($12,778.85)	17.5 ($6,449.71) (Note: Tim & Arthur re-styled Meg & Dan's original challenge bedroom from week 1.)
3	Family Bathroom	24.5 ($28,229.87)	20.5 ($21,346.06)	16 ($27,856.61)	22 ($26,432.58)
4	Master Bedroom, Ensuite & WIR	Disqualified (Note: Rachel & Connie were disqualified for cheating.) ($36,461.35)	20.5 ($38,207.51)	18.5 ($33,626.90) (Note: Dylan & Keegan also completed an attic space this week, but it was not presented for judging.)	19 ($33,473.36)
5	Living Room	26 ($24,724.03)	25 ($13,445.22)	24.5 (Note: A minus 1 was played by Rachel & Connie against Dylan and Keegan.) ($17,273.88)	17.5 ($18,171.31)
6	Kitchen & Dining	15.5 ($24,178.69)	26 ($21,642.01)	19 ($24,583.81)	27.5 (Note: Tim & Arthur played a plus 1 increasing Ann-Louise's score to 9.5) ($19,953.05)
7	Family Room	18 ($26,859.62) (Note: Rachel & Connie also completed their catch-up guest bedroom this week)	26 ($17,109.68) (Note: Meg & Dan also completed their catch-up guest bedroom this week)	27.5 (Note: Dylan & Keegan played a plus 1 increasing Chris's score to 8.5) ($16,903.91)	24 ($9,962.14)
8	Entrance, Powder Room, Staircase & Hallway	19 (Note: Rachel & Connie were deducted a point from Lauren's score for cheating again.) ($14,044.23)	23.5 ($18,764.35)	27.5 ($14,972.83) (Note: Dylan & Keegan also completed their home office space this week)	6.5 ($22,618.67)
9	Do-Over Week	Disqualified (Note: Rachel & Connie were disqualified for cheating again.) ($3,633.34)	24 ($3,707.69)	19 (Note: Dylan & Keegan played a plus 1 increasing Chris's score to 6.) ($1,345.35)	Disqualified (Note: Tim & Arty were disqualified for cheating.) ($4,357.66)
10	Garage & Laundry	18.5 ($9,709.65)	25.5 (Note: Meg & Dan were given an extra 0.5 for the best display of give & take artwork.) (Note: A minus 1 was played against Meg & Dan by Tim & Arty.) ($14,962.06)	24.5 (Note: Dylan & Keegan were given an extra 0.5 for the best display of give & take artwork.) (Eliminated) (Note: Dylan & Keegan were eliminated from winning the room reveal prize by Tim & Arty.) ($11,592.57)	27 ($15,828.58)
11	Courtyard & Balcony	14 ($20,282.97)	17.5 (Note: A minus 2 was played by Dylan & Keegan against Meg & Dan.) ($14,906.79)	21 (Note: Dylan & Keegan played a plus 1 increasing Chris's score to 6.) ($10,193.57)	Disqualified (Note: Tim & Arty were disqualified for cheating again.) ($9,879.05)
12	Rest Of Outside	19.5 ($7,159.20)	24.5 ($21,704.45)	27 ($5,315.05)	28.5 ($31,492.42)

Colour key:
Highest Score
Lowest Score

=== Judges' scores ===
Summary of Judges' Scores
Week	Area(s)	Scores	Teams			
Week	Area(s)	Scores	Connie & Rachel	Meg & Dan	Dylan & Keegan	Tim & Arthur
1	Guest Bedroom	Ann-Louise	7.5	8	8.5	3
1	Guest Bedroom	Chris	8.5	8	7.5	6.5
1	Guest Bedroom	Lauren	8.5	9.5	7.5	5
1	Guest Bedroom	Total	24.5	25.5	23.5	14.5
2	Kids Bedroom	Ann-Louise	8	6.5	5	9
2	Kids Bedroom	Chris	-	-	-	-
2	Kids Bedroom	Lauren	7.5	7	7	8.5
2	Kids Bedroom	Total	15.5	13.5	12	17.5
3	Family Bathroom	Ann-Louise	8.5	6.5	5.5	7
3	Family Bathroom	Chris	7.5	6	4	7
3	Family Bathroom	Lauren	8.5	8	6.5	8
3	Family Bathroom	Total	24.5	20.5	16	22
4	Master Bedroom, Ensuite & WIR	Ann-Louise	8.5	7	6.5	6
4	Master Bedroom, Ensuite & WIR	Chris	7	6.5	5	6.5
4	Master Bedroom, Ensuite & WIR	Lauren	?	7	7	6.5
4	Master Bedroom, Ensuite & WIR	Total	Disqualified	20.5	18.5	19
5	Living Room	Ann-Louise	8	8	9(-1)	4
5	Living Room	Chris	8.5	8	7.5	6
5	Living Room	Lauren	9.5	9	9	7.5
5	Living Room	Total	26	25	24.5	17.5
6	Kitchen & Dining	Ann-Louise	4	9	7.5	9.5
6	Kitchen & Dining	Chris	5.5	7.5	4	9
6	Kitchen & Dining	Lauren	6	9.5	7.5	9
6	Kitchen & Dining	Total	15.5	26	19	27.5
7	Family Room	Ann-Louise	6	8	9.5	7.5
7	Family Room	Chris	5	9	7.5	7.5
7	Family Room	Lauren	7	9	9.5	9.5
7	Family Room	Total	18	26	27.5	24
8	Entrance, Powder Room, Staircase & Hallway	Ann-Louise	6	8	9.5	1.5
8	Entrance, Powder Room, Staircase & Hallway	Chris	6	7.5	8.5	2
8	Entrance, Powder Room, Staircase & Hallway	Lauren	7	8	9.5	3
8	Entrance, Powder Room, Staircase & Hallway	Total	19	23.5	27.5	6.5
9	Do-Over Week	Ann-Louise	?	8.5	6	9
9	Do-Over Week	Chris	8	7	6	?
9	Do-Over Week	Lauren	9	8.5	7	9.5
9	Do-Over Week	Total	Disqualified	24	19	Disqualified
10	Garage & Laundry	Ann-Louise	6.5	9	9	9.5
10	Garage & Laundry	Chris	5.5	7.5	7.5	8.5
10	Garage & Laundry	Lauren	6.5	9	8	9
10	Garage & Laundry	Total	18.5	25.5	24.5	27
11	Courtyard & Balcony	Ann-Louise	5	6.5	7	5.5
11	Courtyard & Balcony	Chris	3	5.5	6	6
11	Courtyard & Balcony	Lauren	6	5.5	8	6.5
11	Courtyard & Balcony	Total	14	17.5	21	Disqualified
12	Rest Of Outside	Ann-Louise	5	8.5	9.5	9.5
12	Rest Of Outside	Chris	6.5	7.5	8	9
12	Rest Of Outside	Lauren	8	8.5	9.5	10
12	Rest Of Outside	Total	19.5	24.5	27	28.5
12	Overall House	Ann-Louise	6	8.5	9	8
12	Overall House	Chris	5.5	7	7.5	9
12	Overall House	Lauren	7.5	9.5	9	9
12	Overall House	Total	19	25	25.5	26

=== Challenge results ===
Week	Challenge	Prize	Winner
1	Multi-Task Challenge	Premium Westinghouse Kitchen Upgrade	Dylan & Keegan
1	Nuts & Bolts Gamechanger	Gets given the room order and a two-day head start on the room of their choice	Meg & Dan
2	New Kids on the Block Challenge	$5,000 of Citta vouchers	Meg & Dan
2	Mini Golf Gamechanger	15 second advantage in a future challenge	Meg & Dan
3	Tile Space Rubik's Cube	$5000 of tiling labour	Dylan & Keegan
3	Human Curling	$3,500 of Pop Motif Art ($2,500 for 2nd - Dylan & Keegan)	Tim & Arthur
3	Toilet Paper Mummy Gamechanger	2 hours of painting from another team + an Undo card to reverse any other game changers	Dylan & Keegan
4	Light at the end of the tunnel challenge	$8,000 of premium lighting from Lighting Direct	Meg & Dan
4	Walk the Plank Challenge	$2000 cash, $5000 art and an entertainment system upgrade	Meg & Dan
4	Ladder Golf Gamechanger	$600 cash and a Minus 1	Connie & Rach
5	Dinner Wars	Outside of their house painted by a team of Resene Eco Decorators	Dylan & Keegan
5	Cup Stack Gamechanger	Front door upgrade, Undo card, plus 1	Tim & Arthur
6	Flooring Xtra Art Challenge	Outside fireplace from Living Flame to the value of $10,000 ($5,000 for 2nd - Tim & Arthur)	Dylan & Keegan
6	Odd Jobs Community Challenge	Extra $5,000 cash on top of their earnings, and an odd job completed by each of the other teams	Meg & Dan
6	Fruit & Veg Bowling Gamechanger	Plus 1 and get out of doing the odd job for Meg & Dan	Dylan & Keegan
7	Whitewater Rafting Challenge	$5,000 of Citta vouchers	Tim & Arthur
7	Subway Sandwich Artist Challenge	$5,000 cash	Tim & Arthur
7	Nut Stacking Gamechanger	Minus 1 and dinner cooked for them by the losing team which was Meg & Dan	Tim & Arthur
8	Suzuki Football Challenge	Outdoor Entertainment Package with Samsung 55" Outdoor TV and Soundbar	Dylan & Keegan
8	Briscoes Challenge	First equal each get: Outdoor heater and $1250 of outdoor furniture vouchers	Meg & Dan Connie & Rach
8	Magic Carpet Gamechanger	Plus 1 and a luxury night at the SkyCity Grand (Undo for 2nd - Meg & Dan)	Dylan & Keegan
9	Dart-Off Challenge	BBQ and $5,000 cash (with lesser value BBQs for 2nd, 3rd and 4th)	Tim & Arthur
9	Teammate Portrait Gamechanger	Plus 1 and $500 added to their budget	Dylan & Keegan
10	Blockstars	$5,000 cash, $5,000 of outdoor furniture vouchers and the power to eliminate one team from winning room reveal	Tim & Arthur
10	Marble Run Gamechanger	Minus 2	Dylan & Keegan
11	Treetop Challenge	$5,000 worth of plants from The Plant Company ($2,000 for 2nd - Dylan & Keegan)	Connie & Rach
11	RealEstate.co.nz Challenge	$8,000 cash	Meg & Dan
11	Marshmallow Gamechanger	Undo and can take $1,000 from another team	Connie & Rach
12	Paintball Target Challenge	$5,000 cash	Tim & Arthur
12	Nosy Neighbours Challenge	$5,000 cash and get to pick the auction order	Dylan & Keegan

== Auction results ==
The final episode and live auctions were due to be held on September 5, however the date was deferred to 14 November due to COVID-19.

House	Auction spot	Couple	Reserve	Auction result	Profit	Total winnings	Placing spot
1	4th	Connie and Rachel	$2.27m	$2.692m	$422,000	$422,000	4th
2	3rd	Megan and Daniel	$2.222m	$2.7m	$478,000	$478,000	3rd
3	2nd	Dylan and Keegan	$2.155m	$2.745m	$590,000	$590,000	2nd
4	1st	Tim and Arthur	$2.165m	$2.825m	$660,000	$760,000	1st
