= House Rules NZ =

- Genre: Reality; Renovation
- Presented by: Duncan Heyde
- Starring: Jade Hurst
- Judges: Katrina Hobbs; Michael Murray
- Country of origin: New Zealand
- Original language: English
- No. of seasons: 1
- No. of episodes: 21

Production
- Production location: Auckland suburbs
- Production company: Sky Free

Original release
- Network: Three
- Release: 10 September 2023

Related
- House Rules

House Rules NZ is a New Zealand reality television series based on the Australian series which broadcast on 10 September 2023 on Three. The series follows teams of two who renovate each other's homes, with the team receiving the highest score winning $100,000 off their home loan.

The series was announced in December 2022 due the postponement of The Block NZ 2024 series after the former season homes struggled to sell in a struggling house market. On 6 August 2023, the series confirmed its host, judges and five teams and premiered on 10 September 2023 on Three.

== Contestant Teams ==
House Rules introduced five new teams all from across New Zealand.

| # | Team | Ages | House | Occupation | Relationship |
|---|---|---|---|---|---|
| 1 | Jemma & Alvaro Pasek | 32 & 34 | Glen Eden | Teacher & e-commerce and digital operations manager | Married |
| 2 | Martinique Glass & Andre Helm | 36 & 38 | Ōtāhuhu | Teacher & Builder | Married |
| 3 | Char & Violet Oliver | 53 & 73 | Murrays Bay | Account manager & semi-retiree | Mother & Daughter |
| 4 | Sherwen & Nikita Manik | 36 & 34 | Howick | Financial advisor & nurse | Married |
| 5 | Jarrad Cullen & Theresa Cullen | 50 & 52 | New Lynn | Change manager & canteen assistant | Cousins |

== Elimination history ==
Teams' progress through the competition
| Phase: | Interior Renovation (Phase 1) | | | | | | Phase 2 | Grand Finale | |
| Phase: | J&A | M&A | J&T | S&N | C&V | Round Total (out of 120) | Re-do Room | Front Yard | |
| Team | Scores | | | | | Round Total (out of 120) | Round Total (out of 30) | Round Total (out of 30) | Final Result |
| Jemma & Alvaro | – | 18 | 22 | 27 | 17 | 2nd (84) | 1st (28) | 28 | Winners |
| Martinique & Andre | 24 | – | 21 | 24 | 14 | 3rd (83) | 2nd (21) | 27 | Runners-up |
| Char & Violet | 17 | 25 | 19 | 28 | – | 1st (89) | 3rd (17) | Eliminated (Episode 18) | |
| Sherwen & Nikita | 23 | 21 | 25 | – | 13 | 4th (82) | Eliminated (Episode 16) | | |
| Jarrad & Theresa | 16 | 20 | – | 22 | 10 | 5th (68) | Eliminated (Episode 16) | | |

== Competition details ==
=== Phase 1: Interior Renovation ===
The five teams travel to different cities in the country to completely renovate each other's home. Every week, one team hands over their house to their opponents for a complete interior transformation. The teams are given 5½ days and a set of rules from the owners known as the 'House rules' which need to be followed to gain high scores from the judges and the homeowner team.

==== Glen Eden: Jemma & Alvaro ====
- Episodes 1 to 3
- Airdate — 10 to 12 September 2023
- Description — Jemma & Alvaro from Glen Eden are the first team to hand over their keys for renovation.

Renovation 1
Glen Eden, Auckland
House Rules
| Rule 1 | Fuse Scandi with coastal in a modern way | | | | | |
| Rule 2 | Bring in natural light and style with earthy tones | | | | | |
| Rule 3 | Be clever with integrated design features | | | | | |
| Rule 4 | Transform our bathroom into a relaxation retreat | | | | | |
| Rule 5 | Supersize our lounge and kitchen giving us space to party | | | | | |
| Team | Zone | Scores | | | Total (out of 30) | Running Total (Reno 1) |
| Team | Zone | Homeowner | Katrina | Michael | Total (out of 30) | Running Total (Reno 1) |
| Martinique & Andre | Main Bathroom & Second Bedroom | 9 | 8 | 7 | 24 | 24 / 30 |
| Sherwen & Nikita | Third Bedroom & Ensuite | 8 | 7 | 8 | 23 | 23 / 30 |
| Char & Violet | Master Bedroom & Living Room | 6 | 6 | 5 | 17 | 17 / 30 |
| Jarrad & Theresa | Kitchen, Laundry, Dining Room & Hallway | 6 | 5 | 5 | 16 | 16 / 30 |
| Jemma & Alvaro | —N/a | | | | | — |

==== Ōtāhuhu: Martinique & Andre ====
- Episodes 4 to 6
- Airdate — 17 to 19 September 2023
- Description — Martinique & Andre from Ōtāhuhu are the second team to hand over their keys for renovation. One of the bedrooms belong to their toddler children.

Renovation 2
Ōtāhuhu, Auckland
House Rules
| Rule 1 | Revitalise our 1940’s cottage with timber accents & pops of natural colour | | | | | |
| Rule 2 | Give the boys a nature themed bedroom with rich green tones | | | | | |
| Rule 3 | Include clever and generous storage everywhere! | | | | | |
| Rule 4 | Give us a total WOW splash-proof bathroom | | | | | |
| Rule 5 | Cool, classic and calm. Not basic | | | | | |
| Team | Zone | Scores | | | Total (out of 30) | Running Total (Reno 1 & 2) |
| Team | Zone | Homeowner | Katrina | Michael | Total (out of 30) | Running Total (Reno 1 & 2) |
| Char & Violet | Kitchen, Dining Room & Spare Bedroom | 9 | 8 | 8 | 25 | 42 / 60 |
| Sherwen & Nikita | Laundry & Main Bedroom | 7 | 7 | 7 | 21 | 44 / 60 |
| Jarrad & Theresa | Kids’ Bedroom & Living Room | 8 | 6 | 6 | 20 | 36 / 60 |
| Jemma & Alvaro | Entranceway & Bathroom | 7 | 6 | 5 | 18 | 18 / 30 |
| Martinique & Andre | —N/a | | | | | 24 / 30 |

==== New Lynn: Jarrad & Theresa ====
- Episodes 7 to 9
- Airdate — 24 to 26 September 2023
- Description — Ja & Theresa are the third team to hand over their keys for Jarrad's house renovation in New Lynn. Two of the bedrooms belong to Jarrad's teenage sons.
  - House 1 winner's advantage: Martinique & Andre — Both can leave site separately
  - Previous winner's advantage: Char & Violet — 5 minute call with the homeowners

Renovation 3
New Lynn, Auckland
House Rules
| Rule 1 | Use funky lighting to enhance deep, heritage colours | | | | | |
| Rule 2 | Make life easier with clever storage ideas (e.g. pet bowls hidden in kickboards) | | | | | |
| Rule 3 | The bathroom should be natural but luxe with a walk-in shower | | | | | |
| Rule 4 | Turn upstairs into #lit teenage boys hangout | | | | | |
| Rule 5 | Surprise Ky with a gaming themed bedroom & LED lighting | | | | | |
| Team | Zone | Scores | | | Total (out of 30) | Running Total (Reno 1 to 3) |
| Team | Zone | Homeowner | Katrina | Michael | Total (out of 30) | Running Total (Reno 1 to 3) |
| Sherwen & Nikita | Living Room, Stairway & Upstairs Bathroom | 7 | 9 | 8 | 25 (24 + 1)^{1} | 69 / 90 |
| Jemma & Alvaro | Upstairs Hallway, Laundry & Main Bedroom | 6 | 8 | 8 | 22 | 40 / 60 |
| Martinique & Andre | Jordyn’s Bedroom, Kitchen & Dining Room | 7 | 7 | 7 | 21 | 45 / 60 |
| Char & Violet | Downstairs Hallway, Downstairs Bathroom & Bedroom | 6 | 7 | 6 | 19 | 61 / 90 |
| Jarrad & Theresa | —N/a | | | | | 36 / 60 |

Notes

*^1 Sherwen & Nikita received a bonus point for having the best statement piece of the week, which was added to their weekly score.

==== Howick: Sherwen & Nikita ====
- Episodes 10 to 12
- Airdate — 1 to 3 October 2023
- Description — Sherwen & Nikita are the fourth team to hand over their keys for their house renovation in Howick. Two of the bedrooms belong to their children. This renovation introduced the bonus room, where in if the homeowners like it and pass it the team who has it receives 3 points, however if it's a fail they lose 3 points.

Renovation 4
Howick, Auckland
House Rules
| Rule 1 | Style our home like a five-star hotel | | | | | |
| Rule 2 | Upgrade our bedroom to feel like a luxurious hotel suite | | | | | |
| Rule 3 | In the lounge, think family movie nights & parents only date nights | | | | | |
| Rule 4 | Give us fifty shades of monochromic | | | | | |
| Rule 5 | Let there be light in the dark & dreary spaces in our home | | | | | |
| Team | Zone | Scores | | | Total (out of 30) | Running Total (Reno 1 to 4) |
| Team | Zone | Homeowner | Katrina | Michael | Total (out of 30) | Running Total (Reno 1 to 4) |
| Char & Violet | Entranceway, Ensuite, Aria’s Bedroom & Bonus Room | 9 | 8 | 8 | 28 (25 + 3)^{2} | 89 / 120 |
| Jemma & Alvaro | Kitchen, Walk-in Robe & Jayden’s Bedroom | 9 | 9 | 9 | 27 | 67 / 90 |
| Martinique & Andre | Living Room, Hallway & Laundry | 8 | 8 | 8 | 24 | 69 / 90 |
| Jarrad & Theresa | Main Bedroom, Bathroom & Toilet | 8 | 7 | 7 | 22 | 58 / 90 |
| Sherwen & Nikita | —N/a | | | | | 69 / 90 |

Notes

*^2 Due to draw of a hat, Char & Violet had the power of the bonus room to keep it or give it to another team, they decided to keep it. The bonus room was the Dining Room. Nikita & Sherwen judged it as a pass and the team gained 3 points, which is added to their final score.

==== Murrays Bay: Char & Violet ====
- Episodes 13 to 16
- Airdate — 8 to 15 October 2023
- Description — Char & Violet are the fifth and final team to hand over their keys for their interior house renovation in Murrays Bay. Three of the bedrooms belong to Char's children. The two teams with the lowest overall score of all renovations will be eliminated.
  - House 3 winner's advantage: Sherwen & Nikita — received a bonus house rule which they can keep for themselves or share with the other teams
  - Previous winner's advantage: Char & Violet — As the winners of the previous renovation, they were given the power to allocated zones, however, due to overspending the budget on the last renovation, they lost this advantage.

Renovation 5
Murrays Bay, Auckland
House Rules
| Rule 1 | Think Byron Bay with a mid-century modern twist | | | | | |
| Rule 2 | Style with natural texture - stone, linens, wool & brass finishings | | | | | |
| Rule 3 | Create an amazing walk-in ensuite experience | | | | | |
| Rule 4 | Deliver a kitchen fit for a celebrity chef! | | | | | |
| Rule 5 | Give me a rumpus room that can host games nights & also sleep guests | | | | | |
| Bonus Rule | Clever use of space for our modern young adults double-bedrooms | | | | | |
| Team | Zone | Scores | | | Total (out of 30) | Final Total (Reno 1 to 5) |
| Team | Zone | Homeowner | Katrina | Michael | Total (out of 30) | Final Total (Reno 1 to 5) |
| Char & Violet | —N/a | | | | | 1st (89) |
| Jemma & Alvaro | Upstairs Hallway, Ensuite & Mali’s Bedroom | 1 | 8 | 8 | 17 | 2nd (84) |
| Martinique & Andre | Downstairs Hallway, Family Bathroom, Main Bedroom & Bonus Room | 1 | 9 | 9 | 14 (19 - 5)^{3} | 3rd (83) |
| Sherwen & Nikita | Kitchen, Dining Room & Leroy’s Room | 1 | 6 | 6 | 13 | 4th (82) |
| Jarrad & Theresa | Woody’s Bedroom, Laundy & Stairwell | 1 | 5 | 4 | 10 | 5th (68) |

Notes

*^3 Due to draw of a hat, Martinique & Andre had the power of the bonus room to keep it or give it to another team, they decided to keep it. The bonus room was the Rumpus Room. Unlike the previous bonus room, this one is worth 5 points instead of 3. Char & Violet judged it as a fail and the team lost 5 points, which is taken from their final score.

=== Phase 2 ===
==== Re-do Room ====
- Episode 16 to 18
- Airdate — 15 to 17 October 2023
- Description — The remaining three teams head back to their own homes and must fix and redo one of the rooms in 3 days. All teams received the same set of five rules for the challenge. The lowest scoring team will be eliminated. This phase included guest judge, winner of The Block NZ 2014, Alex Walls.
  - Semi-finalist advantages: Each team received bonus money on top of their budget in order of how the resulted in Phase 1:
    - Char & Violet: $1,300
    - Jemma & Alvaro: $700
    - Martinique & Andre: $500

Renovation summary
Re-do Room
House Rules
| Rule 1 | You may work on either the main bedroom or the living room but can only choose one | | | | |
| Rule 2 | You have a budget of $5,000 | | | | |
| Rule 3 | Transform the space to reflect your original House Rules | | | | |
| Rule 4 | You must stay together at all times | | | | |
| Rule 5 | You have 72 hours | | | | |
| Team | Zone | Scores | | | Total (out of 30) |
| Team | Zone | Katrina | Michael | Alex | Total (out of 30) |
| Jemma & Alvaro | Main Bedroom | 9 | 10 | 9 | 28 |
| Martinique & Andre | Living Room | 7 | 7 | 7 | 21 |
| Char & Violet | Main Bedroom | 6 | 6 | 5 | 17 |

=== Grand Finale ===
- Episode 19 to 21
- Airdate — 22 to 24 October
- Description — The final 2 teams have to renovate their opponent's front yard exterior and gardens. The team that received the highest score wins the season (thus becoming first House Rules NZ champions) and received $100,000 off their mortgage.
  - Along with their budget, both teams received $20,000 to spend at Palmers.
    - Halfway through renovation, both teams received an extra $5,000 toward their renovation.

Renovation summary
Grand Final
| House Rules | Jemma & Alvaro's | Martinique & Andre's |
|---|---|---|
| Rule 1 | Give us a contemporary Kiwi garden with a coastal spin | Think English cottage garden meets Mediterranean alfresco living |
| Rule 2 | Extend our lounge room vibes outside giving us seamless indoor-outdoor flow | Use warm whites and charcoals with terracotta, brick and stone |
| Rule 3 | Raise the roof on our deck | Give the boys an outdoor play space & mum and dad somewhere to soak under the stars |
| Rule 4 | You have a budget of $15,000 to transform the front yard | |
| Rule 5 | You have five days | |

| Team | Area | Scores | | | Total (out of 30) | Final Result |
| Team | Area | Katrina | Michael | Homeowners | Total (out of 30) | Final Result |
|---|---|---|---|---|---|---|
| Jemma & Alvaro | Front yard | 9 | 9 | 10 | 28 | Winners^{4} |
| Martinique & Andre | Front yard | 9 | 8 | 10 | 27 | Runners-up |

Notes

*^4 As winners of the series, Jemma & Alvaro received $100,000 off their mortgage, however, they decided to give $20,000 to Martinique & Andre.

== Episodes ==
| Wk. | Ep no. | Episode titles by stage of season | | | Air date |
|---|---|---|---|---|---|
| 1 | 1 | Phase 1: Interior Renovation | Glen Eden Renovation (Jemma & Alvaro) | Introduction | Sunday, 10 September |
| 1 | 2 | Phase 1: Interior Renovation | Glen Eden Renovation (Jemma & Alvaro) | Renovation Continues | Monday, 11 September |
| 1 | 3 | Phase 1: Interior Renovation | Glen Eden Renovation (Jemma & Alvaro) | House Reveal & Scores | Tuesday, 12 September |
| 2 | 4 | Phase 1: Interior Renovation | Ōtāhuhu Renovation (Martinique & Andre) | Introduction | Sunday, 17 September |
| 2 | 5 | Phase 1: Interior Renovation | Ōtāhuhu Renovation (Martinique & Andre) | Renovation Continues | Monday, 18 September |
| 2 | 6 | Phase 1: Interior Renovation | Ōtāhuhu Renovation (Martinique & Andre) | House Reveal & Scores | Tuesday, 19 September |
| 3 | 7 | Phase 1: Interior Renovation | New Lynn Renovation (Jarrad & Theresa) | Introduction | Sunday, 24 September |
| 3 | 8 | Phase 1: Interior Renovation | New Lynn Renovation (Jarrad & Theresa) | Renovation Continues | Monday, 25 September |
| 3 | 9 | Phase 1: Interior Renovation | New Lynn Renovation (Jarrad & Theresa) | House Reveal & Scores | Tuesday, 26 September |
| 4 | 10 | Phase 1: Interior Renovation | Howick Renovation (Sherwen & Nikita) | Introduction | Sunday, 1 October |
| 4 | 11 | Phase 1: Interior Renovation | Howick Renovation (Sherwen & Nikita) | Renovation Continues | Monday, 2 October |
| 4 | 12 | Phase 1: Interior Renovation | Howick Renovation (Sherwen & Nikita) | House Reveal & Scores | Tuesday, 3 October |
| 5 | 13 | Phase 1: Interior Renovation | Murrays Bay Renovation (Char & Violet) | Introduction | Sunday, 8 October |
| 5 | 14 | Phase 1: Interior Renovation | Murrays Bay Renovation (Char & Violet) | Renovation Continues | Monday, 9 October |
| 5 | 15 | Phase 1: Interior Renovation | Murrays Bay Renovation (Char & Violet) | House Reveal & Homeowners Scores | Tuesday, 10 October |
| 5 | 16 | Phase 1: Interior Renovation | Murrays Bay Renovation (Char & Violet) | Judges’ Scores & Double Elimination | Sunday, 15 October |
| 5 | 16 | Phase 2: Re-do Rooms | | Introduction | Sunday, 15 October |
| 6 | 17 | Phase 2: Re-do Rooms | | Renovation continues | Monday, 16 October |
| 6 | 18 | Phase 2: Re-do Rooms | | Reveal & Elimination | Tuesday, 17 October |
| 7 | 19 | Grand Finale Renovation (Front Exterior & Garden) | | Introduction | Sunday, 22 October |
| 7 | 20 | Grand Finale Renovation (Front Exterior & Garden) | | Renovation Continues | Monday, 23 October |
| 7 | 21 | Grand Finale Renovation (Front Exterior & Garden) | | Reveal, Scores & Winner Announced | Tuesday, 24 October |
