= The Block NZ season 1 =

The Block NZ
- Season 1
- No. of episodes: 20

Release
- Original network: TV3
- Original release: 4 July – 6 September 2012

Season chronology
- Next → Season 2

The first season of New Zealand reality television series The Block NZ premiered on 4 July 2012, and ended on 6 September 2012. The season was judged by Victoria Bidwell and Stewart Harris.

Sibling team Libby and Ben Crawford won the season, selling their house for a profit of $157,000 and winning the $80,000 prize money. Dating couple Sarah Adams and Richard Boobyer came second, selling their house for a $64,000 profit, teenage sweethearts Ginny Death and Rhys Wineera sold their house for a profit of $11,000, while engaged couple Rachel Rasch and Tyson Hill sold their house for the reserve price.

In 2015, it was reported that the house would be demolished in order for apartments to be built.

== Contestants ==
House	Couple (ages)	Relationship	Hometown
1	Rachel Rasch (35) & Tyson Hill (36)	Engaged	Wellington
2	Sarah Adams (20) & Richard Boobyer (24)	Partners	Hamilton
3	Libby Crawford (29) & Ben Crawford (31)	Sister & Brother	Christchurch & Auckland
4	Ginny Death (22) & Rhys Wineera (23)	Partners	New Plymouth

== Episodes ==
Episode	Week	Title	Original release date
1	1	"Episode 1"	4 July 2012
The four couples meet for the first time and are given the task of finding one of four Mazda BT50s before making their way around Auckland to locate four red blocks each that are worth $5,000 and reach the Block first to determine the order the houses are chosen. After finding the first red block, teams were given a choice to build a toolbox to the same standards as one previously built by Mark to earn a bonus red block, or to continue on the hunt and increase their chances of reaching the houses first. All four teams opted to complete this additional task and receive $25,000 in total. Ginny and Rhys arrive first at the Block and select house four, Libby and Ben arrive second and select house three, Sarah and Richard arrive third and select house two and Rachel and Ty arrive last and are given house one.
2	1	"Episode 2"	5 July 2012
The four couples enter their houses for the first time and are all shocked to see just how bad a condition they are in. After spending an entire day cleaning up the houses, the teams all meet Shannon Ryan, the Games Master, and Peter, the Construction Supervisor. After learning that the first room they will be required to deliver will be the second bedroom, everyone hires builders and electricians as work begins.
3	2	"Episode 3"	11 July 2012
The couples begin their first room renovation, the second bedroom, and Mark challenges them to build a wall to his exact measurements—with a prize that will turn the competition upside down, the winning team of this week's challenge have the opportunity to swap houses with another team.
4	2	"Episode 4"	12 July 2012
Ginny and Rhys deliver their house swap verdict. Shannon sets the couples a distressing challenge, the couples are each given a brand new bedside table and are required to distress the table to make it look like a piece of antique furniture. Judges Victoria Bidwell and Stewart Harris assess the first room makeovers. The winners of the first week's renovation is Libby and Ben with a score of 11.5 out of 20.
5	3	"Episode 5"	18 July 2012
The teams are required to build a piece of furniture from recycled material. This week room is the study/child's bedroom, teams are required to furnish the room with recycled furniture.
6	3	"Episode 6"	19 July 2012
The challenge is a plumbing challenge, each team must run piping from a starting point to a tap. The first team to get water flowing through the tap wins the competition. Rachael & Tyson are the winning team of this week's challenge.
7	4	"Episode 7"	25 July 2012
This week the teams are required to renovate the bathroom and laundry. The challenge this week is for each team to cook and host a meal for the other teams. The other teams are required to score the teams on their hosting of the meal.
8	4	"Episode 8"	26 July 2012
The team challenge this week ran over two nights with the first two teams hosting their meal on the first night and the second two team hosting their meal tonight. Sarah and Richard choose a strategic vote giving all other teams a score of 1 out 10 thinking other teams will more than likely make a similar move. Sarah and Richard win this week's challenge and receive a lot of criticism for their choice to score the other teams a low score in order to win the competition. The winning team of this week's room was Ginny and Rhys with a score of 14.5 out of 20.
9	5	"Episode 9"	1 August 2012
This week the teams are required to complete the Lounge and Hallway. Today's challenge was to build a dog house, the winning team of the doghouse challenge was Libby and Ben. Part of the winning prize was that the winning team won $2000 but they had to take this money from another team of their choice. Libby and Ben chose to take this money from Sarah and Richard who the previous week chose to sabotage the competition by scoring all teams 1 out 10 in the meal challenge.
10	5	"Episode 10"	2 August 2012
The teams were given a room full of furniture but with everything painted in white. The teams were required to colour the rooms and furniture in colours of their own choice with the best choice of colour winning the competition. Libby and Ben were the winners of the Lounge and Hallway with a score of 15.5 out of 20.
11	6	"Episode 11"	8 August 2012
This week the teams were required to complete the kitchen and dining areas. The challenge for today was to redesign a balcony of an Auckland waterfront apartment. The teams were given an apartment each and required to decorate the area in any design of their choice.
12	6	"Episode 12"	9 August 2012
The teams were required to decorate a room for a magazine shoot, the teams were allowed to hire expensive furniture items for this challenge. Once the room was designed and photographed the teams had to create their own magazine page layout.
13	7	"Episode 13"	15 August 2012
The final interior room was decorated this week, the master bedroom and ensuite. Today's challenge was to create a mosaic art work from broken tiles, the teams had to also incorporate pieces of broken plates and cups into their design.
14	7	"Episode 14"	16 August 2012
The teams were required to complete a maze challenge where they must run through a maze to find pieces of outdoor furniture, once the pieces are found the teams are required to assemble the furniture. This week there were two prizes, one for the best master bedroom and one for the best ensuite. Ginny and Rhys were the winning team for the master bedroom with a score of 18 out of 20, Libby and Ben had the winning ensuite with a score of 8 out of 10.
15	8	"Episode 15"	22 August 2012
The competition now moves outside with teams competing to landscape the front of their section and start on the exterior paintwork of the house. Today's challenge was for the teams to create a flower arrangement, a requirement of the challenge was the men from each team were required to create the arrangement all the women on each team could do was advise their partner verbally on how to create the arrangement. The prize was to grab as much money possible from a money tree in sixty seconds.
16	8	"Episode 16"	23 August 2012
Work on the front of the section continued with Sarah and Richard plantting a large palm tree on their property upsetting their neighbours. The challenge today was to build an eco friendly challenge with each team required to build a compost bin. The winning team took home a selection of plants for the garden with the runners up taking home a smaller value in plants.
17	9	"Episode 17"	29 August 2012
The final room challenge and this time teams are required to landscape the backyard. The teams are given this time 10 days to complete the challenge instead of the usual 7 days, teams are required to use the 3 additional days to finish off and fix the rest of the property and present the house for auction. The challenge today was to build a feature in the garden out of paving blocks, the winners were Rachel and Tyson with their herb garden.
18	9	"Episode 18"	30 August 2012
Work on the backyard continues. A winner is not revealed this week as the challenge carries on into the next week. Today's challenge was to market the house for auction to a team of real estate agents.
19	10	"Episode 19"	5 September 2012
The final week and a two-hour episode. In the first half of the episode teams work hard to complete the backyard and finish off the rest of the house. Sarah and Richard were the winning team with a score of 18.5 out 20. At the conclusion of the final room challenge the teams return to their homes for four weeks before competing in the final challenge. The final challenge consisted of two parts the first part the teams were required to clean and present the house for auction and for final judging. The houses were then judged by New Zealand celebrities who feature on various TV3 shows. The second part to the challenge was for each team to pick one part of the house they would like to see fixed up or improved. After writing down their wishes the final part of the challenge was to have another team carry out that wish for them. The prize for the final challenge determined the order the houses were auctioned in.
20	10	"Episode 20"	6 September 2012
The final episode, also a two-hour episode, featured a look back at the competition over the past 10 weeks and the final auction. The results of the final challenge were revealed with winners Libby and Ben choosing to auction their house first. Second place, Ginny and Rhys choose to auction the house third, third place Sarah and Richard chose to auction the house second leaving Tyson and Rachel to auction their house last. In the final hour of the show the houses were auctioned on live TV. The winners were revealed to be Libby and Ben with a profit of $157,000. The prize was to take home $80,000 in addition to the profit made.

== Score history ==
Teams' progress through the competition
	Scores:	Teams			
	Scores:	Rachel & Tyson	Sarah & Richard	Libby & Ben	Ginny & Rhys
Week	Rooms	Scores			
2	Guest Bedroom	9	11	11.5	8
3	Kids Bedroom & Office	13.5	12	13	12.5
4	Bathroom & Laundry	9.5	10	13	14.5
5	Lounge & Hallway	8	10	15.5	9.5
6	Kitchen & Dinning	12	14	16	16.5
7 (a)	Master Bedroom	7	14	14	18
7 (b)	Ensuite	5	7.5	8	7
8	Front Yard	15	15.5	14.5	12
9&10	Backyard	15.5	18.5	16.5	15.5

=== Winners & Losers ===
Week	Room	Judges' verdict			
Week	Room	Winner	Score	Lowest	Score
2	Guest Bedroom	Libby & Ben	11.5	Ginny & Ryhs	8
3	Kids Bedroom & Office	Rachel & Tyson	13.5	Sarah & Richard	12
4	Bathroom & Laundry	Ginny & Ryhs	14.5	Rachel & Tyson	9.5
5	Lounge & Hallway	Libby & Ben	15.5	Rachel & Tyson	9
6	Kitchen & Dinning	Ginny & Ryhs	16.5	Rachel & Tyson	12
7 (a)	Master Bedroom	Ginny & Ryhs	8	Rachel & Tyson	7
7 (b)	Ensuite	Libby & Ben	8	Rachel & Tyson	5
8	Front Yard	Sarah & Richard	15.5	Ginny & Rhys	12
9&10	Backyard	Sarah & Richard	18	Rachel & Tyson/Ginny & Rhys	15.5

=== Challenges ===
Week	Challenge	Prize	Winner
1	Race to the block	First choice of house	Ginny & Rhys
2	Build a wall	Swap your house for another teams and 3 days of free builders	Ginny & Rhys
2	Distressing furniture	Euroclass wardrobe for master bedroom	Rachael & Tyson
3	Create an original piece of furniture	1st equal: $4,000 (Libby & Ben) and (Sarah and Richard), 3rd: $1,500 (Rachael & Tyson)	Sarah & Richard
3	Create an original piece of furniture	1st equal: $4,000 (Libby & Ben) and (Sarah and Richard), 3rd: $1,500 (Rachael & Tyson)	Libby & Ben
3	Pipeworks Challenge	Night at the Rendezvous Hotel and $1,000 cash	Rachael & Tyson
4	Dinner Wars	House painted by Dulux	Sarah & Richard
5	Dog House Challenge	Kitchen upgrade and $2,000 (taken from Sarah & Richard)	Libby & Ben
5	Colour a Room Challenge	1st: $2,000 and 42" television (Ginny & Rhys) 2nd equal: $1,000 and 36" television	Ginny & Rhys
5	Best feature in their room	$1,500	Sarah & Richard
6	Redeisgn a balcony	1st: Ultimate Barbeque and Truck load of Other Teams Balcony Items (Sarah & Richard) 2nd: 6 Burner Barbeque (Ginny & Rhys) 3rd: 4 Burner Barbeque (Rachel & Tyson) 4th: 3 Burner Barbeque (Libby & Ben)	Sarah & Richard
6	Decorate a room for a magazine cover	AG-150 Mitsubishi Controller Automation System and 3 days for free trades people	Libby & Ben
7	Mosaic art challenge	Spa and outdoor shower	Rachael & Tyson
7	Missing Pieces Challenge	Outdoor Fireplace	Sarah & Richard
8	Flower Arranging	1st: Money tree grab and $2,000 of outdoor furniture (Sarah & Richard) 2nd: $1,600 outdoor furniture (Ginny & Rhys), 3rd: $1,400 outdoor furniture (Libby & Ben), 4th: $1,000 outdoor furniture (Rachael & Tyson)	Sarah & Richard
8	Compost Bin Challenge	1st: Solar panels and $2,500 of mature trees (Libby & Ben), 2nd: $1,400 of mature trees (Sarah & Richard), 3rd: $800 of mature trees (Rachael & Tyson), 4th: $500 of mature trees (Ginny & Rhys).	Libby & Ben
9	backyard feature build	Free trades people	Rachael & Tyson
9	Marketing Challenge	Marketing package from trade me	Libby & Ben
10	Build something for another teams house	First pick of auction order	Libby & Ben

== Auction ==
Rank	Couple	Reserve	Auction Result	Profit	Total Winnings	Auction Order
1	Libby & Ben	$804,000	$961,000	$157,000	$237,000	1st
2	Sarah & Rich	$806,000	$870,000	$64,000	$64,000	2nd
3	Ginny & Rhys	$794,000	$805,000	$11,000	$11,000	3rd
4	Rachel & Tyson	$798,000	$798,000	$0	$0	4th
