= The Block NZ season 8 =

New Zealand reality television

The Block NZ
- Season 8
- No. of episodes: 48

Release
- Original network: Three
- Original release: 17 June – 8 September 2019

Season chronology
- ← Previous; Season 7 Next → Season 9

The eighth season of New Zealand reality television series The Block NZ, titled The Block NZ: Firehouse, premiered on 17 June 2019. It is set in the Auckland suburb of Kingsland, with the south side of the block overlooking the Outer Oval of Eden Park. The entire apartment complex was formerly a fire station that later turned into a boarding house. It is, overall, the most difficult and expensive renovation.

The judges are Lizzi Whaley and Jason Bonham, the hosts are Mark Richardson and former judge Shelly Ferguson and the site foreman is Peter Wolfkamp.

The show also has a revamped sponsors list. The financial bank is TSB Bank, also a New Zealand-owned bank, replacing Kiwibank. There is no coffee sponsor due to the proximity to local cafes and bars on New North Road and Kingsland railway station; the lunch and breakfast sponsor is Subway. The car prizes for People's Choice award remains with Suzuki.

== Contestants ==
The teams selected for this season are as follows:

Apartment	Couple (ages)	Relationship	Hometown
1	Stacy Heyman (25) & Adam Middleton (25)	Couple	Wellington
2	Lisa Ridout-Gordon (37) & Chris "Ribz" Gordon (34)	Married	Wellington
3	Ethan Ordish (26) & Sam Whatarangi (27)	Mates	Hamilton/Te Kūiti
4	Sophia Gardiner (31) & Mikaere Gardiner (32)	Married	Tūrangi

== Score history ==
The prize for winning room reveal is $7000 cash. For weeks 4 and 5, it was changed to $10,000.

To offset Apartment 2's least desirable position, small usable floor area and low ceiling, a safe containing game-changing bonuses are hidden there. They include a +2 card, an undo card and The Big Steal - the ability to steal $5000 off a team's overall budget. Lisa & Ribz used this to steal $5000 off Sophia & Mikaere at the end of week 4.

Amy & Stu, who won the seventh season, returned for the third week to compete against the four teams to create a bathroom for Apartment 5 (not-for-auction communal space), and won $7,000 cash.

In week 4, the teams were scored out of 40 (10 per judge per room); Sophia and Mikaere were eliminated for continuing to style their room after the tools down deadline.

In week 5, the teams worked on Apartment 5 with a separate budget. Stacy & Adam did the living room with a budget of $7000, Lisa & Ribz did the laundry and second bedroom with a budget of $8200, Ethan & Sam did the first bedroom and hallway with a budget of $8300, and Sophia & Mikaere did the kitchen and dining room with a budget of $8500.

In week 8, Stacy & Adam scored the first genuine perfect score (i.e. no bonus +1 cards being used) since Alex & Corban's garage in season 3.

In week 9, teams chose a room to redo. Lisa & Ribz chose the entranceway, hallway and laundry, Ethan & Sam chose the kids bedroom, and Stacy & Adam chose the guest bedroom. Each team was given $10,000, as they all scored higher than they originally did with the room they redid. Sophia and Mikaere also scored a perfect 20 points, despite a -1 played on them.

In week 12, due to the overall low scores of Common lobby and stairwell, they were given half a day to redo the space, along with other adjustments for the final week.

Teams' progress through the competition
		Teams				Guests
		Stacy & Adam	Lisa & Ribz	Ethan & Sam	Sophia & Mikaere	Amy & Stu
Week	Rooms	Scores (cash spend)				
1	Guest bedroom	13 ($13,701.02)	9.5 ($11,252.26)	14 ($14,615.86)	15 ($14,912.39)	—N/a
2	Kids bedroom	16 ($12,351.95)	8 ($12,297.90)	4 (Note: Additional point for give and take challenge) ($13,235.51)	13 ($10,586.41)	—N/a
3	Family bathroom	0 ($15,296.02)	0 ($17,133.99)	3.5 ($16,089.83)	17 (Note: Additional point for the recycled timber challenge: using part of the old firehouse to make something in the room) ($25,161.37)	18.5 ($21,695.04)
4	Master bedroom and ensuite	23 ($33,611.27)	29.5 (Note: A +2 was played) ($27,199.24)	6 ($33,882.10)	Disqualified ($31,417.07)	—N/a
5	Rooms of Apartment 5	13 ($6,676.50)	5 ($8,150.82)	3 ($6,484.68)	12.5 (Note: Stacy & Adam played a -1) (Note: A +1 was played) (Note: Stacy & Adam played an undo) ($7,044.04)	—N/a
6	Kitchen and dining	18.5 ($24,382.58)	17.5 ($24,931.70)	16.5 ($29,365.21)	13.5 ($19,908.57)	—N/a
7	Living and media rooms	17 ($36,732.76)	16.5 (Note: A +½ was played) ($20,786.18)	16 ($20,490.51)	12.5 ($16,600.43)	—N/a
8	Entranceway, hallway and laundry	20 ($36,497.89)	11 ($18,241.27)	12.5 ($20,365.72)	~~7~~ Eliminated (Note: Eliminated by Stacy & Adam) ($20,474.63)	—N/a
9	Redo	18 (Note: Sophia & Mikaere played a -1) ($10,011.07)	14.5 ($2,731.25)	13 ($6,942.18)	19 ($8,545.59)	—N/a
10	Outdoor terraces	17.5 ($20,918.96)	14.5 ($6,605.47)	12.5 ($3,857.47)	15.5 ($10,326.56)	—N/a
11	Common lobby and stairwell	8.5 ($7,615.64)	4 ($8,109.75)	4 ($9,006.41)	11.5 ($11,825.05)	—N/a
12	Redo Week 2	N/A				—N/a

== Auction results ==
Only Lisa & Ribz's unit was sold for $50,000 over the reserve price. Ethan & Sam's unit was sold at reserve price because they borrowed from Mark. Apartment 1 sold before the auction ended, Apartment 4 did not meet reserve on auction night. Due to the rule of the house having to be sold at auction night, which no longer reflects the true house market, Lisa and Ribz won an extra $100,000 for the most profit. Ethan & Sam won the People's Choice award: a new car.

Apt	Auction spot	Couple	Reserve	Auction Result	Profit	Total Winnings	Placing spot
1	3	Stacy & Adam	$1,480,000	$1,480,000 (after auction)	$0	$0	2nd
2	1	Lisa & Ribz	$1,290,000	$1,340,000	$50,000	$150,000	1st
3	2	Ethan & Sam	$1,390,000	$1,390,000	$0	$0	2nd
4	4	Sophia & Mikaere	>$1,600,000	$1,550,000 (two weeks after auction)	$-50,000	$0	4th

The communal Apartment 5 failed to sell at a separate auction on 7 November 2019. It was finally sold on 19 December 2019 for between $850,000 and $900,000.
