= The Block NZ season 5 =

The Block NZ
- Season 5
- No. of episodes: 46

Release
- Original network: TV3
- Original release: 29 May – 14 August 2016

Season chronology
- ← Previous; Season 4 Next → Season 6

The fifth season of New Zealand reality television series The Block NZ, titled The Block NZ: Girls vs Boys, premiered on 29 May 2016. It is set in the Auckland suburbs of Meadowbank. The prize money for achieving the most profit from the auction was raised to $100,000 for this series.

== Contestants ==
| House | Couple (ages) | Relationship | Hometown |
|---|---|---|---|
| 1 | Niki Osborne (29) & Tiffany "Tiff" Mair (35) | Best Mates | Christchurch & Wānaka |
| 2 | Dylan "Dyls" Cossey (27) & Dylan "Dylz" Guitink (25) | Workmates | Mount Maunganui |
| 3 | Emma Diamond (27) & Courtney Courtney Mackay (25) | Best Friends | Dunedin |
| 4 | Sam Cable (29) & Emmett Vallender (29) | Room Mates | Wellington |

== Score history ==
Teams' progress through the competition
| Scores: | | Teams | | | |
| Scores: | | Niki & Tiff | Dylz & Dyls | Emma & Courtney | Sam & Emmett |
| Week | Rooms | Scores | | | |
| 1 | House 5 Team Challenge | 16 | 12 | 12 | 5½ |
| 2 | Kid's Bedroom | 10 | 15 | 14.5 | 18 (Note: The plus 1 "Game Changer" was used.) |
| 3 | Bathroom | 16.5 | 11 | 15 | 14.5 |
| 4 | Guest Bedroom | 18 | 12.5 | 10 | 16 |
| 5 | Lounge | 14.5 | 16 | 14 | 12 |
| 6 | Master Bedroom & Ensuite | 17 | 10 | 11 | 13.5 (Note: The Minus 1 " Game Changer" was used.) |
| 7 | Kitchen & Dinning | 15 | 15 | 13.5 | 16.5 |
| 8 | Entrance & Stairs | (Dis) 11 (Note: Dylz & Dyls eliminated Niki & Tiff from this week's room reveal) | 8.5 | 10 | 7.5 |
| 9 | Garage & Laundry | 12.5 | 15 | 16.5 | 14.5 |
| 10 | Outdoors | 17 | 16.5 | 13 | 12 |

== Results ==
=== Room reveals ===
| Week | Room | Judges' verdict | | | |
| Week | Room | Winner | Score | Lowest | Score |
|---|---|---|---|---|---|
| 1 | House 5 Team Challenge | Emma & Courtney | 12 | Dylz & Dyls | 12 |
| 1 | House 5 Team Challenge | Niki & Tiff | 16 | Sam & Emmett | 5½ |
| 2 | Kid's Bedroom | Sam & Emmett | 18 | Niki & Tiff | 10 |
| 3 | Bathroom | Niki & Tiff | 16.5 | Dylz & Dyls | 11 |
| 4 | Guest Bedroom | Niki & Tiff | 18 | Emma & Courtney | 10 |
| 5 | Lounge | Dylz & Dyls | 16 | Sam & Emmett | 12 |
| 6 | Master Bedroom & Ensuite | Niki & Tiff | 17 | Dylz & Dyls | 10 |
| 7 | Kitchen & Dinning | Sam & Emmett | 16.5 | Emma & Courtney | 13.5 |
| 8 | Entrance & Stairs | Emma & Courtney | 10 | Niki & Tiff | (Dis) 11 |
| 9 | Garage & Laundry | Emma & Courtney | 16.5 | Niki & Tiff | 12.5 |
| 10 | Outdoors | Niki & Tiff | 17 | Sam & Emmett | 12 |

=== Team Judging ===
| Week | Room | Niki & Tiff | Dylz & Dyls | Emma & Courtney | Sam & Emmett |
|---|---|---|---|---|---|
| 1 | House Five Team Challenge | — | | | |
| 2 | Kid's Bedroom | 18.5 | 20 | 21 | 23 |
| 3 | Bathroom | 15 | 21 | 21.5 | 20 |
| 4 | Guest Bedroom | — | | | |
| 5 | Lounge | 17 | 19 | 20.5 | 18 |
| 6 | Master Bedroom & Ensuite | 20.5 | 16.5 | 19 | 18.5 |
| 7 | Kitchen & Dinning | 19.5 | 19.5 | 20 | 17.5 |
| 8 | Entrance & Stairs | — | | | |
| 9 | Garage & Laundry | 17 | 17 (Note: Dylz & Dyls used a plus one score, winning the room.) | 20 (Note: Emma & Courtney were eliminated from garage and laundry week by Sam & Emmett) | 17 |

=== Challenge Scores ===
| Week | Challenge | Prize | Winner |
|---|---|---|---|
| 1 | The Block Olympics | $6,500 Central Heating New Zealand heating system upgrade for 2 houses | Dylz & Dyls |
| 1 | Rollercoaster and Safe Challenge | A lock to protect your house from being taken and Keys to swap your house with another teams | 1st Sam & Emmett (lock) |
| 1 | Rollercoaster and Safe Challenge | A lock to protect your house from being taken and Keys to swap your house with another teams | 2nd Emma & Courtney (keys) (Note: Emma & Courtney swapped houses with Dyls & Dylz when they accepted the keys from Mark. They were not able to swap with Sam & Emmett as they chose the lock to secure their house.) |
| 2 | Up-cycling a chair | $5,000 of haier help | Niki & Tiff |
| 2 | The Great Prison Break | $10,000 of tradies from builders crack | Sam & Emmett (shared prize) |
| 2 | The Great Prison Break | $10,000 of tradies from builders crack | Niki & Tiff (shared prize) |
| 2 | The baby photos challenge | Game Changer (plus 1) | Sam & Emmett |
| 3 | The Lampshade Challenge | $5,000 of custom curtains | Sam & Emmett |
| 3 | The Sunken Lounge | Haier Kitchen Upgrade | Niki & Tiff |
| 3 | The Blindfold Challenge | Game Changer (plus 1) and key to safe box | Sam & Emmett |
| 4 | Dinner Wars | House painted by dulux | Sam & Emmett |
| 4 | Granny Dress Up | Game changer (plus 1) and $3,500 of bamboo eco lighting | Emma & Courtney |
| 5 | Clockworks challenge | Beam alliance internal vacuum system | Dylz & Dyls |
| 5 | Candle Challenge | $5000 freedom vouchers | Dylz & Dyls |
| 5 | Decorate Cushion Challenge | $2,400 breville small appliances and key to safe box | Sam & Emmett |
| 6 | freedom free for all challenge | ILI One Touch interactive splashback | Niki & Tiff |
| 6 | Walk-the-plank Challenge | $11,500 storage battery for excess solar power | Emma & Courtney |
| 6 | Scrabble Challenge | Night at rendezvous hotel, Game Changer (minus 1) and Key to safe box | Niki & Tiff |
| 7 | Blank Canvas Challenge | An original piece of art and your picture on the cover of Your Home & Garden magazine | Emma & Courtney |
| 7 | Pita pit wall design Challenge | $5,000 of trees and plants from palmers | Niki & Tiff |
| 7 | Pita pit wall design Challenge | $5,000 of trees and plants from palmers | Sam & Emmett |
| 7 | Fruit and vegetable bowling | Wireless home security system, Game Changer (minus 1) and Key to safe box | Sam & Emmett |
| 8 | Block stars entertainment challenge | $5,000 cash and can eliminate one team from room reveal | Dylz & Dyls |
| 8 | Ladder Golf | Game Changer (minus 1) and Key to safe box | Emma & Courtney |
| 9 | Odd Jobs Challenge | Gasmate Barbeque and Key to safe box | Dylz & Dyls |
| 9 | Hanging washing Challenge | Game changer (minus 1) and $3,500 of Outdoor lighting | Sam & Emmett |
| 10 | Firth Designer Paving Challenge | $8,000 of oceanweave outdoor furniture | Emma & Courtney |
| 10 | Lego Challenge | Greenacres cleaners to clean their house | Niki & Tiff |
| 11 | Nosey Neighbours Quiz | 1 Year free house and contents insurance | Sam & Emmett |

== Auction ==
| House | Auction spot | Couple | Reserve | Auction Result | Profit | Total Winnings | Placing spot |
|---|---|---|---|---|---|---|---|
| 1 | 1 | Niki & Tiff | $1,170,000 | $1,320,000 | $150,000 | $150,000 | 4th |
| 2 | 3 | Dyls & Dyls | $1,190,000 | $1,341,000 | $151,000 | $151,000 | 3rd |
| 3 | 2 | Emma & Courtney | $1,210,000 | $1,510,000 | $300,000 | $300,000 | 2nd |
| 4 | 4 | Sam & Emmett | $1,230,000 | $1,610,000 | $380,000 | $480,000 | 1st |
