= The Block NZ season 2 =

The Block NZ
- Season 2
- No. of episodes: 31

Release
- Original network: TV3
- Original release: 26 August – 4 November 2013

Season chronology
- ← Previous; Season 1 Next → Season 3

The second season of New Zealand reality television series The Block NZ premiered on 26 August 2013 and ended on 4 November 2013. It ran three nights per week, Monday–Wednesday.

The season was set in the Auckland suburb of Belmont, and was judged by Jeremy Hansen, the editor of HOME New Zealand magazine since 2005, and Janice Kumar-Ward, founder of The Recipes in 2008.

== Contestants ==
House	Couple (ages)	Relationship	Hometown
1	Alice Pearson (26) & Caleb Pearson (26)	Married	Auckland
2	Alisa Keall-Grant (23) & Koan Vette (25)	Partners	Auckland
3	Pete Walker (26) & Andy Walker (23)	Brothers	Southland Region
4	Lauren "Loz" Heaphy (30) & Tom Heaphy (31)	Married	Nelson

== Episodes ==
Episode	Week	Title	Original release date
1	1	Episode 1	26 August 2013
The four couples meet for the first time and are given the task of finding one of four Mazda 6s and find their own tool belt before making their way around Auckland to locate five red blocks each that are worth $20,000 and reach the Block first to determine the order the houses are chosen. After finding the first two red blocks in their tool belt and Mazda 6, teams have to build a letterbox for the house. All four teams completed this task and received an amount of money from Mark, who judged them out of 20 in total. Their next red block was at the Quarry. Shannon instructed them that the person takes the diggers to the gravel while the other one will do the digging. The last block was at the beach. Alisa and Koan arrived first at the Block and select house two, but there was a twist. They also had to choose the houses for the other contestants. Alice and Caleb were given house one, Pete and Andy house three, and Loz and Tom were given house four.
2	1	Episode 2	27 August 2013
The four couples go into their houses and find it as a tip. The next morning they wake up to an early start to renovate the house. Mark calls them for breakfast. He tells them who their construction supervisor is, Peter.
3	1	Episode 3	28 August 2013
In this episode the couples get to see how the judges judge them in their challenge rooms. The get 7 hours and they have to finish it in that time. Their judges are Jeremy Hansen and Janice Kumar-Ward. The winner gets to swap houses. The winner was Pete and Andy with a score of 7 out of 10.
4	2	Episode 4	2 September 2013
The couples find out that no one is swapping houses. They start their second bedroom and get to see the challenge house. Their challenge was to make a board with wallpaper the same as Mark's and they have to put their house number on it. The winner is Pete and Andy again.
5	2	Episode 5	3 September 2013
The couples do their rooms getting ready in time for judging. Shannon has a challenge for them. They have to upcycle a furnitiure. The winner was Alice and Caleb.
6	2	Episode 6	4 September 2013
The couples finish their rooms. The winners are Alice and Caleb again with a score of 15 out of 20.
7	3	Episode 7	9 September 2013
They start their kids bedroom. The couples are obliged to use the beds they made in the previous challenge.
8	3	Episode 8	10 September 2013
The couples do their rooms getting ready in time for judging. Shannon has a challenge for them. They have to connect the water from one end to the other using pipes. The winner was Alisa and Koan.
9	3	Episode 9	11 September 2013
The couples finish their rooms. Alice and Caleb get disqualified by Mark for not using the challenge bed in their room with 12.5/20. Winners are Loz and Tom with 12/20.
10	4	Episode 10	16 September 2013
The couples start their bathroom and laundry. Also dinner war starts, here is the order: Alice & Caleb, Alisa & Koan, Pete & Andy and finally Loz & Tom. Alice & Caleb got 20/30 for food and Alisa & Koan got 20.9/30 for food.
11	4	Episode 11	17 September 2013
12	4	Episode 12	18 September 2013
13	5	Episode 13	23 September 2013
14	5	Episode 14	24 September 2013
15	5	Episode 15	25 September 2013
16	6	Episode 16	30 September 2013
17	6	Episode 17	1 October 2013
18	6	Episode 18	2 October 2013
19	7	Episode 19	7 October 2013
20	7	Episode 20	8 October 2013
21	7	Episode 21	9 October 2013
22	8	Episode 22	14 October 2013
23	8	Episode 23	15 October 2013
24	8	Episode 24	16 October 2013
25	9	Episode 25	21 October 2013
26	9	Episode 26	22 October 2013
27	9	Episode 27	23 October 2013
28	10	Episode 28	28 October 2013
29	10	Episode 29	29 October 2013
Teams create a advertorial video for their house with the help of a New Zealand celebrity.
30	10	Live final	30 October 2013
The four houses go to auction live on TV. See the auction results here.
31	11	The Block NZ: Unlocked	4 November 2013
Teams talk about their time on The Block.

== Score history ==
Teams' progress through the competition
	Scores:	Teams			
	Scores:	Alice & Caleb	Alisa & Koan	Pete & Andy	Loz & Tom
Week	Rooms	Scores			
2	Guest Bedroom	15	14	12	10
3	Kids Bedroom	(Dis) 12.5	8.5	10	12
4	Bathroom & Laundry	15.5	14.5	13.5	18.5
5	Lounge & Hallway	12.5	14	12	12.5
6	Kitchen, Dinning & Study	14	12	12	16
7	Master Bedroom & Ensuite	15	16.5	13	14
8	Front Yard	16	(Dis) 15	16.5	16
9	Backyard	15	13	15	17

=== Winners & Losers ===
Week	Room	Judges' verdict			
Week	Room	Winner	Score	Lowest	Score
2	Guest Bedroom	Alice & Caleb	15	Loz & Tom	10
3	Kids Bedroom	Loz & Tom	12	Alice & Caleb	(Dis) 12.5
4	Bathroom & Laundry	Loz & Tom	18.5	Pete & Andy	13.5
5	Lounge & Hallway	Alisa & Koan	14	Pete & Andy	12
6	Kitchen, Dinning & Study	Loz & Tom	16	Alisa & Koan/Pete & Andy	12
7	Master Bedroom & Ensuite	Alisa & Koan	16.5	Pete & Andy	13
8	Front Yard	Pete & Andy	16.5	Alisa & Koan	(Dis) 15
9	Backyard	Loz & Tom	17	Alisa & Koan	13

=== Challenges ===
week	Challenge	Prize	Winner
1	Race to the Block	Allocate Each House to a Team	Alisa & Koan
1	Design a Room	Swap Your House for Another Teams	Pete & Andy
2	Bunnings Wallpaper Challenge	A Week of Free Builders	Pete & Andy
2	Upcycle a Piece of Furniture	$5,000 Gift Card for Freedom Furniture	Alice & Caleb
3	Build a Kids Bed	Night at the Rendezvous Hotel and $1,000 cash	Loz & Tom
3	Underwater Plumbing	$10,000 Bathroom Upgrade	Alisa & Koan
4	Dinner Wars	House Painted by Dulux	Loz & Tom
5	Bespoke Furniture	Fisher & Paykel Kitchen Upgrade and $1,000 from Each of the Other Teams	Pete & Andy
5	Freedom Shopping Challenge	$5,000 Shopping Spree at Freedom Furniture	Loz & Tom
6	Create a Bedhead	Outdoor Kitchen and Barbeque	Alice & Caleb
6	Design a Cover for Your Home & Garden Magazine	Custom Built Classic Wardrobe Upgrade and a Week of Free Builders	Loz & Tom
6	Safe Box	$3,000 (Loz & Tom), $2,000.20 (Pete & Andy) and $1,000 (Alisa & Koan)	All Teams
7	Memory Tiles	Novas Spa Pool and a Week of Free Builders	Alice & Caleb
7	Walk the Plank	Metro Dulux Outdoor Fireplace	Pete & Andy
8	Paving Challenge	$5,000 for Bunnings Outdoor Range	Loz & Tom
8	Obstacle Course	$7,000 (Pete & Andy), $5,000 (Alisa & Koan), $4,000 (Alice & Caleb) and $2,000 (Loz & Tom)	Pete & Andy
9	Jenga	$10,000 Solar Panel Package	Alice & Caleb
9	Build a Kids Playhouse	House Cleaned by Green Acres Cleaners	Pete & Andy
10	Jigsaw House	3 Points (Alice & Caleb), 2 Points (Loz & Tom), 1 Point (Pete & Andy)	Alice & Caleb
10	Block Quiz	3 Points (Loz & Tom), 2 Points (Pete & Andy), 1 Point (Alice & Caleb)	Loz & Tom
10	Open Home Vote	3 Points (Pete & Andy), 2 Points (Alice & Caleb), 1 Point (Loz & Tom)	Pete & Andy
10	Trade Me Auction	$5,000 Marketing Package from Trade Me	Alice & Caleb

=== Dinner Wars Results ===
Team	Score		
Team	Food	Fun	Total
Alice & Caleb	20	24.5	44.5
Alisa & Koan	20.9	22.5	43.4
Pete & Andy	22.5	25	47.5
Loz & Tom	25	24	49

=== Auction results ===
There was a 3-way tie in the week 10 challenges with Alice & Caleb, Pete & Andy and Loz & Tom all on 6 points. To determine who wins, all the judges scores and challenge wins were added up and determined that Pete & Andy were the most successful team so they got to choose the auction order.

Rank	Couple	Reserve	Auction Result	Profit	Total Winnings	Auction Order
1	Alice & Caleb	$945,000	$1.126m	$181,000	$261,000	3rd
2	Alisa & Koan	$948,000	$1.014m	$66,000	$66,000	4th
3	Pete & Andy	$925,000	$952,000	$27,000	$27,000	1st
4	Loz & Tom	$922,000	$947,000	$25,000	$25,000	2nd
