= The Block NZ season 6 =

The Block NZ
- Season 6
- No. of episodes: 49

Release
- Original network: Three
- Original release: 25 June – 17 September 2017

Season chronology
- ← Previous; Season 5 Next → Season 7

The sixth season of New Zealand reality television series The Block NZ, titled The Block NZ: Side X Side, premiered on 25 June 2017. It is set in the Auckland suburb of Northcote.

Bernadette Morrison and Jason Bonham, who were the judges in the fourth season, returned this season as the series judges.

There was strong uproar from the New Zealand public as a result of Andy & Nate taking the win at the auctions of this season. Many believed that they "stole" the win from Stace & Yanita by having their house put back onto the market after Stace & and Yanita had secured the win. Andy & Nate earned $31,000 over their reserve in their second auction, while Stace & Yanita had $20,000 and would have won the extra $100,000 in prize money had the fifth auction not taken place.

== Contestants ==
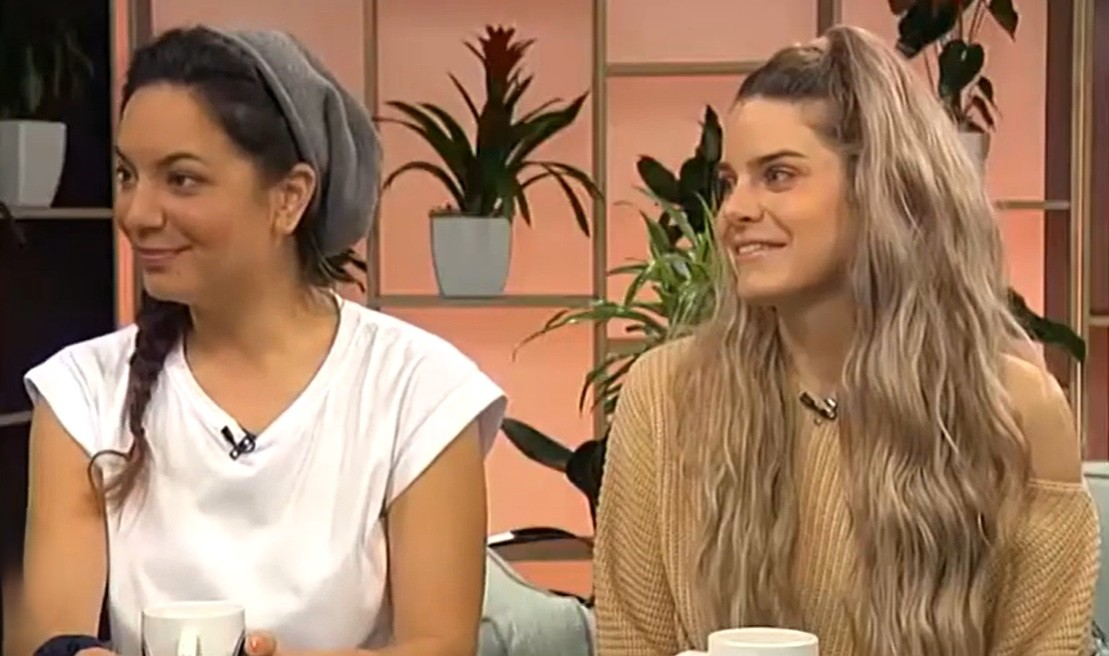
Left to right: Stacy Cottrill, Yanita McLeay in 2017

The teams selected for this season are as follows:

House	Couple (ages)	Relationship	Hometown
1	Levi "Ling" Inglis (22) & Zachary "Zing" Inglis (24)	Brothers	Christchurch
2	Andy Murdie (38) & Nathan "Nate" Ross (33)	Brothers-in-law	Hamilton
3	Julia & Ali Heaney (both 28)	Twin sisters	Auckland
4	Stacy Cottrill (40) & Yanita McLeay (29)	Friends	Palmerston North

== Score history ==
The prize for winning room reveal is $5,000 cash.

Teams' progress through the competition
Scores:		Teams			
Scores:		Ling & Zing	Andy & Nate	Julia & Ali	Stace & Yanita
Week	Rooms	Scores			
1	Kids Bedroom	6	18	4	11.5
2	Family Bathroom	13	9	16	14.5 (Note: Minus 2 was played against this team)
3	Blank Canvas	6	17.5	14.5	11
4	Master Bedroom & Ensuite	8	15	10	14
5	Kitchen & Dining Room	16.5	11.5	17	13
6	Living Room	15	13.5	14.5	8.5
7	Do up week	4	16.5	16	17
8	Guest Bedroom & 2nd Bathroom	16	16.5	15.5	14
9	Garage & Laundry	17.5	18	(Note: Disqualification (Stace and Yanita for getting help painting and Julia & Ali were eliminated by block stars winner Andy & Nate).)	-
10	Entrance, Stairs & Powder Room	11	17.5 (Note: Plus 1 was played)	14	13.5
11	Rooftop Terrace	12.5	10	16	14
12	Outdoors	12.5	18	15.5	14.5

== Challenges ==
Week	Challenge	Prize	Winner
1	DIY Challenge	Allocation of Block Houses	Ling & Zing
1	Rubber Duck Challenge	$10,000 Kitchen Upgrade	Andy & Nate
1	Freedom Furniture Challenge	$10,000 Appliance Upgrade	Julia & Ali
1	Game Changer Challenge	Choice of Lock or Key (Note: As winners of this challenge Ling & Zing were given the choice of secure their house with the lock or switching houses with another team using the keys. They choose the lock. Stacy & Yanita were then given the keys, but chose to remain in house 4.)	Ling & Zing
2	AMP protect your valuables	Snooze bed Valued at $10,000	Julia & Ali
2	Pool Digger Challenge	$5000 Custom Curtains from Freedom Furniture	Julia & Ali
2	Toilet Roll Challenge	Game Changer Minus 2 Points	Julia & Ali
3	Bar Fridge Design Challenge	$5,000 Haier Help	Stacy & Yanita
3	Go Cart Challenge	Bosch tool wall	Andy & Nate
3	Plaster Portrait Challenge	Game Changer (Minus 2) + $4000 of lighting	Stacy & Yanita
4	Tile Memory Challenge	$5,000 Worth of Tile Labour + Spa Pamper Package	Julia & Ali
4	Dart Hangover Challenge	$10,000 of Outdoor Lighting (2nd Place: $5,000 Outdoor Lighting)	Julia & Ali (2nd: Andy & Nate)
4	Ping Pong Challenge	Insurance Against Minus 2 Being Played	Stacy & Yanita
5	Camouflage Challenge	$5,000 Worth of Artwork	Julia & Ali
5	Pita Pit Good Food Challenge	$5,000 worth of Freedom Furniture Homewares	Andy & Nate
5	Stocking Challenge	Game Changer Minus 2 Points	Andy & Nate
6	Dinner Wars	House Oainted by Resene	Stacy & Yanita
6	Cup Stacking Challenge	Game Changer Plus 1	Andy & Nate
7	Selfie Wall Challenge	Three Infratech Outdoor Heaters (2nd Place Won 2, 3rd Place Won 1)	Ling & Zing (2nd Andy and Nate)
7	Makeover Challenge	Game Changer Plus 1	Julia & Ali
8	Concrete Sculpture Challenge	$4,000 Gasmate Barbeque (all teams won a barbeque of a lesser value)	Andy & Nate
8	Walk the Plank	$4,000 of Outdoor Furniture and $2,000 Cash	Andy & Nate
8	Marble's Challenge	Minus 2 Game Changer	Ling & Zing
9	Block Stars	$5000 cash and Chance to Eliminate 1 Team from Room Reveal	Andy & Nate
9	Scrabble Challenge	Insurance Against being Eliminated	Julia & Ali
10	Home Magazine cover	Home Automative System	Ling & Zing
10	Jobs for the Community	Cash Prices	Stacy & Yanita
10	Last Face Standing	Game Changer Plus 1	Ling & Zing
11	Short Film Challenge	Digital Alarmsystem	Julia & Ali
11	Rebus	Cash Price + Minus 2	Julia & Ali
11	Paving Challenge	$5000 of Outdoor Plants	Julia & Ali
12	Auction Order Challenge 1	4 Points	Julia & Ali
12	Auction Order Challenge 2	4 Points	Julia & Ali
12	Auction Order Challenge 3	Years Worth Home Insurance	Ling & Zing
12	Auction Order Challenge Play-off	Decide Auction Order	Ling & Zing

== Team Judging ==
The prize for team judging was $2,000 cash.

Week	Room	Scores			
Week	Room	Ling & Zing	Andy & Nate	Julia & Ali	Stace & Yanita
1	Kids Bedroom	N/A	N/A	N/A	N/A
2	Family Bathroom	21.5	22.5	14.5	21.5
3	Blank Canvas	N/A	N/A	N/A	N/A
4	Master Bedroom & Ensuite	15	17	16.5	14.75
5	Kitchen & Dining Room	25.5	20.5	10.5	23
6	Living Room	14.5	25	9	9.5
7	Do up week	N/A	N/A	N/A	N/A
8	Guest Bedroom & 2nd Bathroom	N/A	N/A	N/A	N/A
9	Garage (Note: All teams strategically scored 0, so no one won the prize and it was added to the room reveal prize in week 10.)	0	0	0	0
10	Rooftop	4	11	4	12.5

== Auction ==
House	Auction spot 1	Couple	Reserve	Overspend/Underspend (included in Reserve)	Auction Result	Profit	Total Winnings	Placing spot
1	1	Ling & Zing	$1,299,000		$1,300,000	$1,000	$1,000	4th
2	2 / 5 (Note: The reserve for House 2 (Andy and Nate) was not met during the initial auction ("Auction 2"), after the other auctions were complete the house was auctioned again ("Auction 5"). The success of the second auction resulted in the win for team 2.)	Andy & Nate	$1,219,000		$1,250,000	$31,000	$131,000	1st
3	3	Julia & Ali	$1,229,000		$1,242,000	$13,000	$13,000	3rd
4	4	Stace & Yanita	$1,251,000		$1,271,000	$20,000	$20,000	2nd
