= The Block NZ season 4 =

The Block NZ
- Season 4
- No. of episodes: 40

Release
- Original network: TV3
- Original release: 29 September – 7 December 2015

Season chronology
- ← Previous; Season 3 Next → Season 5

The fourth season of New Zealand reality television series The Block NZ, titled The Block NZ: Villa Wars, premiered on 29 September 2015, with the final episode airing on 7 December 2015. It was set on the boundaries of the Auckland suburbs of Sandringham and Three Kings. The prize money for achieving the most profit from the auction was raised to $100,000 for this series.

== Contestants ==
House	Couple (ages)	Relationship	Hometown
1	Jamie (24) & Hayden (29)	Engaged	North Shore
2	Sarah (24) & Minanne (19)	Sisters	Hamilton
3	Cat (27) & Jeremy (28)	Partners	Taranaki
4	Brooke (25) & Mitch (26)	Partners	Christchurch

== Score history ==
Teams' progress through the competition
	Scores:	Teams			
	Scores:	Jaime & Hayden	Sarah & Minanne	Cat & Jeremy	Brooke & Mitch
Week	Rooms	Scores			
1	House 1&2 Bedroom Challenge	12	5½	16	13
2	Kids Room	17	15	17½	14
3	Main Bathroom	13	16½	16½	18½ ^{(+1)} (Note: Brooke & Mitch won a point advantage during a Week 3 challenge. They used it during Main Bathroom Reveal.)
4	Family & Living	13½	11	14½	16
5	Master & Ensuite	6½	16½	15	17½ ^{(−1)} (Note: Sarah & Minanne won a point advantage by during a Week 4 challenge. They used it during Master & Ensuite Reveal.)
6	Outdoor Entertaining & Guest Bedroom	17½	14½	18 ^{(+1)} (Note: Cat & Jeremy won a point advantage during a Week 6 challenge. They used it during Outdoor Entertainment Room Reveal.)	17
7	Laundry & Stairs	15	16½	16½	18
8	Outdoor Backyard	18½	12	15½	15 (Note: Cat & Jeremy won an advantage Week 8 challenge. They choose to eliminate Brooke & Mitch from winning the Outdoor Backyard Room Reveal.)
9	Entrance & Hallway	13	14	18	17½
9	Kitchen & Dining (Note: Two teams were disqualified from the Kitchen & Dining Room Reveal by breaking the rules of the Block. Brooke & Mitch for receiving a gift of a Dining Table without paying minimum labour wage and Cat & Jeremy for failing to pay their tiler without minimum labour wage.)	7½	16½	17½ (DSQ)	19½ (DSQ)
10	Frontyard	11½ (Note: Jaime & Hayden won a point advantage during a Week 7 challenge. They have to use it on The Final Room Reveal which they decided to detect a point on themselves.)	14½	18	15½
11	Auction Order (Note: Brooke & Mitch won the final challenge. Their prize is the power to assign the Auction Order.)	3rd	2nd	4th	1st
11	Auction Result	2nd (tie)	4th	2nd (tie)	1st

=== Room reveals ===
Week	Room	Judges' verdict			
Week	Room	Winner	Score	Lowest	Score
1	House 1&2 Bedroom Challenge	Cat & Jeremy	16	Sarah & Minanne	5½
2	Kids Room	Cat & Jeremy	17½	Brooke & Mitch	14
3	Main Bathroom	Brooke & Mitch	18½ ^{(+1)}	Jamie & Hayden	13
4	Family & Living	Brooke & Mitch	16	Sarah & Minanne	11
5	Master & Ensuite	Brooke & Mitch	17½ ^{(−1)}	Jamie & Hayden	6½
6	Outdoor Entertaining & Guest Bedroom	Cat & Jeremy	18 ^{(+1)}	Sarah & Minanne	14½
7	Laundry & Stairs	Brooke & Mitch	18	Jamie & Hayden	15
8	Outdoor Backyard	Jamie & Hayden	18½	Brooke & Mitch	15
9	Entrance & Hallway	Cat & Jeremy	18	Jamie & Hayden	13
9	Kitchen & Dining	Sarah & Minanne	16½	Brooke & Mitch	DSQ (19½)
9	Kitchen & Dining	Sarah & Minanne	16½	Cat & Jeremy	DSQ (17½)
10	Frontyard	Cat & Jeremy	18	Jamie & Hayden	11½

== Auction ==
House	Auction spot ^{J}	Couple	Reserve	Auction Result	Profit	Total Winnings	Placing spot
1	3	Jamie & Hayden	$1,175,000	$1,335,000	$160,000	$160,000	2nd (tie)
2	2	Sarah & Minanne	$1,149,000	$1,272,000	$123,000	$123,000	4th
3	4	Cat & Jeremy	$1,160,000	$1,320,000	$160,000	$160,000	2nd (tie)
4	1	Brooke & Mitch	$1,160,000	$1,350,000	$190,000	$290,000	1st

== Episodes ==
Week	Episode		Original airdate	Timeslot
1	1	"Welcome to The Block"	29 September 2015	Tuesday 7:30pm
1	2	"Who's the builder"	30 September 2015	Wednesday 7:30pm
1	3	"Guest Room Reveal"	5 October 2015	Sunday 7:00pm
2	4	"The Final House"	6 October 2015	Monday 7:30pm
2	5	"Keep up the pace kids"	7 October 2015	Tuesday 7:30pm
2	6	"Tensions Building"	8 October 2015	Wednesday 7:30pm
2	7	"Kids Room Reveal"	11 October 2015	Sunday 7:00pm
3	8	"Time to say Goodbye"	12 October 2015	Monday 7:30pm
3	9	"Playing Catch-Up"	13 October 2015	Tuesday 7:30pm
3	10	"Waterproof Inspection Day"	14 October 2015	Wednesday 7:30pm
3	11	"Main Bathroom Reveal"	18 October 2015	Sunday 7:00pm
4	12	"Villa Wars to Dinner Wars"	19 October 2015	Monday 7:30pm
4	13	"Pre-line nightmare"	20 October 2015	Tuesday 7:30pm
4	14	"CAT-astrophe"	21 October 2015	Wednesday 7:30pm
4	15	"Family & Living Rooms Reveal"	25 October 2015	Sunday 7:00pm
5	16	"Edging one Another"	26 October 2015	Monday 7:30pm
5	17	"Artistic Love"	27 October 2015	Tuesday 7:30pm
5	18	"It's all about the tilers!"	28 October 2015	Wednesday 7:30pm
5	19	"Masters & Ensuite Reveal"	1 November 2015	Sunday 7:00pm
6	20	"What Room now?"	2 November 2015	Monday 7:30pm
6	21	"Griller Warfare"	3 November 2015	Tuesday 7:30pm
6	22	"Bigger is Better"	4 November 2015	Wednesday 7:30pm
6	23	"Outdoor Entertainment Room Reveal"	8 November 2015	Sunday 7:00pm
7	24	"The Bad Omens"	9 November 2015	Monday 7:30pm
7	25	"A Screeching Halt"	10 November 2015	Tuesday 7:30pm
7	26	"Feature Wall Fiasco"	11 November 2015	Wednesday 7:30pm
7	27	"Laundry & Stairs Reveal"	15 November 2015	Sunday 7:00pm
8	28	"The New Threat"	16 November 2015	Monday 7:30pm
8	29	"Deal or No Deal"	17 November 2015	Tuesday 7:30pm
8	30	"Paint Paint Brush Brush"	18 November 2015	Wednesday 7:30pm
8	31	"Outdoor Backyard Reveal"	22 November 2015	Sunday 7:00pm
9	32	"Double Trouble"	23 November 2015	Monday 7:30pm
9	33	"It's a Bird, It's a Plane. No, it's Birdman"	24 November 2015	Tuesday 7:30pm
9	34	"Favours everywhere"	25 November 2015	Wednesday 7:30pm
9	35	"Kitchen & Dining and Entrance & Hallway Reveal"	29 November 2015	Sunday 7:00pm
10	36	"Outdoor Backyard Reveal"	30 November 2015	Monday 7:30pm
10	37	"Surprises"	1 December 2015	Tuesday 7:30pm
10	38	""Outdoor Backyard Reveal"	2 December 2015	Wednesday 7:30pm
10	39	"The Block NZ: Villa Wars Open House and Auction"	6 December 2015	Sunday 7:00pm
11	40	"Unlocked"	7 December 2015	Monday 7:30pm
