= The Block NZ =

- Genre: Reality
- Created by: Julian Cress; David Barbour
- Based on: The Block
- Presented by: Mark Richardson (2012–2022); Shannon Ryan (2012–14); Shelley Ferguson (2015–21)
- Judges: See list of judges
- Country of origin: New Zealand
- No. of seasons: 10
- No. of episodes: 417

Production
- Producer: Aaron Dolbel
- Production locations: Auckland: Takapuna (S1); Belmont (S2); Point Chevalier (S3, S9); Sandringham/Three Kings (S4); Meadowbank (S5); Northcote (S6); Hobsonville Point (S7); Kingsland (S8); Orewa (S10)
- Running time: 60 – 120 minutes
- Production company: Warner Bros. International Television Production

Original release
- Network: Three
- Release: 4 July 2012 – 9 October 2022

The Block NZ is a New Zealand reality television series based on the popular Australian series The Block. The first season premiered on Three on 4 July 2012.

The show is hosted by former New Zealand cricketer Mark Richardson and Shelley Ferguson, while Peter Wolfkamp serves as site foreman. It follows four couples as they compete against each other to completely renovate, room by room, four neighbouring houses in Auckland, and then sell them at auction. Each couple keeps any profit made on the house, and the winner receives a bonus cash sum.

The main sponsors were paint manufacturer Resene, car manufacturer Suzuki, flooring retailer Flooring Xtra, and fast food chain Subway. Throughout seasons 1–2, car manufacturer Mazda was also a main sponsor, but for season 3, the sponsorship was awarded to car manufacturer Honda. Other previous sponsors include Bunnings, BP's Wild Bean Cafe, AMI Insurance and Pita Pit.

The series premiered in Australia on 9Go! on 12 August 2012.

The eleventh series, which was set to air in 2023, was originally postponed to 2024 due to a "challenging house market" and the dismal results of the 10th season. However, in May 2024, despite the 11th season being almost ready for filming, Warner Bros. Discovery cancelled the series due to the network restructure.

== Development ==
The show was initially announced on 24 February 2012, when a casting call went out and saw over 1,000 couples apply. The four couples selected for the first season were announced on the official Facebook page on 17 June 2012.

== Hosts and judges ==
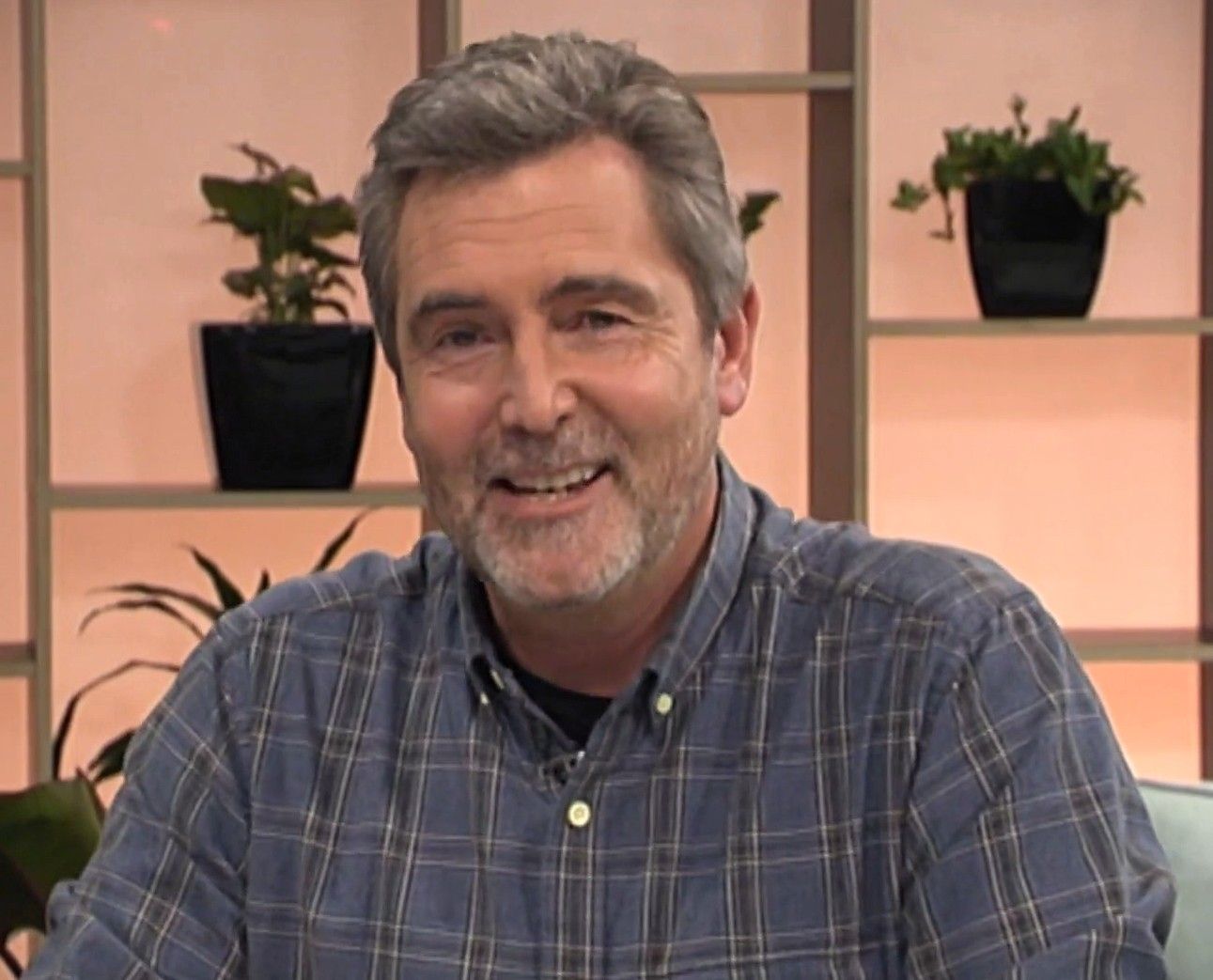
Peter Wolfkamp in 2018

Timeline of hosts, judges and other personnel
Starring	Season									
Starring	1	2	3	4	5	6	7	8	9	10
Current
Mark Richardson	Host	Host	Host	Host	Host	Host	Host	Host	Host	Host
Shelley Ferguson			Judge	Host	Host	Host	Host	Host	Host	Judge
Jason Bonham				Judge		Judge	Judge	Judge		Judge
Peter Wolfkamp	Site foreman	Site foreman	Site foreman	Site foreman	Site foreman	Site foreman	Site foreman	Site foreman	Site foreman	Site foreman
Former
Shannon Ryan	Host	Host	Host							
Victoria Bidwell	Judge									
Stewart Harris	Judge									
Janice Kumar-Ward		Judge								
Jeremy Hansen		Judge								
Mark Gascoigne			Judge							
Fiona McLeod					Judge					
Paul Izzard					Judge					
Bernadette Morrison				Judge		Judge				
Kristina Rapley							Judge			
Lizzi Whaley								Judge		
Chris Stevens									Judge	
Ann-Louise Hyde									Judge	
Lauren Mirabito									Judge	

== Series overview ==
Season	Title	Location	Episodes	Originally aired		Result			
Season	Title	Location	Episodes	Season premiere	Season finale	People's Choice Award winner	Winning team	Winning profit (NZD)	Total profit
1	2012	Takapuna, Auckland	20	4 July 2012	6 September 2012	Not awarded	Libby & Ben Crawford	$157,000	$237,000
2	2013	Belmont, Auckland	31	26 August 2013	4 November 2013	Pete & Andy	Alice & Caleb Pearson	$181,000	$261,000
3	2014	Point Chevalier, Auckland	49	26 August 2014	18 November 2014	Jo & Damo	Alex & Corban Walls	$227,000	$307,000
4	Villa Wars	Sandringham and Three Kings, Auckland	40	29 September 2015	6 December 2015	Cat & Jeremy	Brooke Thompson & Mitch Davies	$190,000	$290,000
5	Girls Vs. Boys	Meadowbank, Auckland	46	29 May 2016	14 August 2016	Dyls Cossey & Dylz Guitink	Sam Cable & Emmett Vallender	$380,000	$480,000
6	Side X Side	Northcote, North Shore, Auckland	49	25 June 2017	17 September 2017	Andy Murdie & Nate Ross	Andy Murdie & Nate Ross	$31,000	$131,000
7	On Point	Hobsonville, Auckland	49	8 July 2018	30 September 2018	Amy Moore & Stu Watts	Amy Moore & Stu Watts	$69,500	$169,500
8	Firehouse	Kingsland, Auckland	48	17 June 2019	8 September 2019	Sam Whatarangi & Ethan Ordish	Lisa Ridout-Gordon & Chris "Ribz" Gordon	$50,000	$150,000
9	2021	Point Chevalier, Auckland	48	14 June 2021	14 November 2021	Dylan & Keegan Crawford	Tim Cotton & Arthur "Arty" Gillies	$660,000	$760,000
10	Redemption	Orewa, Auckland	37	18 July 2022	9 October 2022	Maree & James Steele	Chloe Hes & Ben Speedy	$4,000	$104,000

== Profits ==
Season		No. of teams	No. of properties sold at auction	Winning Prize	Average auction profit	Combined auction profit^{1}
1	2012	4		$80,000	$58,000	$232,000
2	2013	4		$80,000	$74,750	$299,000
3	2014	4		$80,000	$111,250	$445,000
4	2015	4		$100,000	$158,250	$633,000
5	2016	4		$100,000	$245,250	$981,000
6	2017	4		$100,000	$16,250	$65,000
7	2018	4		$100,000	$51,362.50	$205,450
8	2019	4	2	$100,000	$50,000	$50,000
9	2021	4		$100,000	$537,500	$2,150,000
10	2022	4	2	$100,000	$1,025	$4,100
Overall combined profit						$5,060,450
Including Prize Money ($840,000)						$5,900,450

- ^1The combined auction profit excludes the winning prize money

=== Returning teams ===
Contestants	Relationship	Original season		Returning season		Combined profit
Quinn & Ben Alexandre	Married	3	$40,000	10	$0	$40,000
Chloe Hes & Ben Speedy^{2}	Friends	7	$11,500 & $57,000	10	$104,000	$63,500 & $109,000
Maree & James Steele	Married	3	$147,000	10	$100	$147,100
Stacy & Adam Middleton	Married	8	$0	10	$0	$0

- ^2Chloe and Ben originally appeared on the same season, however in separate teams. They returned to season 10 as a team.

== Season synopses ==
=== Season 1 ===
The first season of The Block NZ premiered on 4 July 2012 and ended on 6 September 2012. It is set in the Auckland suburb of Takapuna.

House	Auction spot	Couple	Reserve	Auction Result	Profit	Total Winnings	Placing spot
1	4	Rachel & Tyson	$798,000	$798,000	$0	$0	4th
2	2	Sarah & Rich	$806,000	$870,000	$64,000	$64,000	2nd
3	1	Libby & Ben	$804,000	$961,000	$157,000	$237,000	1st
4	3	Ginny & Rhys	$794,000	$805,000	$11,000	$11,000	3rd

=== Season 2 ===
The second season of The Block NZ premiered on 26 August 2013 and ended on 4 November 2013. It is set in the Auckland suburb of Belmont.

House	Auction spot	Couple	Reserve	Auction Result	Profit	Total Winnings	Placing spot
1	3	Alice & Caleb	$945,000	$1.126m	$181,000	$260,000	1st
2	4	Alisa & Koan	$948,000	$1.014m	$66,000	$66,000	2nd
3	1	Pete & Andy	$925,000	$952,000	$27,000	$27,000	3rd
4	2	Loz & Tom	$922,000	$947,000	$25,000	$25,000	4th

=== Season 3 ===
The third season of The Block NZ premiered on 26 August 2014 and ended on 18 November 2014. It is set in the Auckland suburb of Point Chevalier, the first time the Block was held outside of the North Shore.

House	Auction spot	Couple	Reserve	Auction Result	Profit	Total Winnings	Placing spot
1	3	Quinn & Ben	$1.325m	$1.335m	$10,000	$10,000	4th
2	2	Maree & James	$1.325m	$1.472m	$147,000	$147,000	2nd
3	1	Alex & Corban	$1.325m	$1.552m	$227,000	$307,000	1st
4	4	Jo & Damo	$1.325m	$1.386m	$61,000	$61,000	3rd

=== Season 4 ===
The fourth season of The Block NZ premiered on 29 September 2015. It is set on the boundary of the Auckland suburbs of Sandringham and Three Kings. The title for the fourth season was The Block NZ: Villa Wars.

House	Auction spot	Couple	Reserve	Auction Result	Profit	Total Winnings	Placing spot
1	3	Jamie & Hayden	$1.175m	$1.335m	$160,000	$160,000	2nd (tie)
2	2	Sarah & Minanne	$1.149m	$1.272m	$123,000	$123,000	4th
3	4	Cat & Jeremy	$1.160m	$1.320m	$160,000	$160,000	2nd (tie)
4	1	Brooke & Mitch	$1.160m	$1.350m	$190,000	$290,000	1st

=== Season 5 ===
The fifth season of The Block NZ premiered on 29 May 2016 and is set in the Auckland suburb of Meadowbank. The title of this series is "Girls vs Boys", with two of the teams being made up of females and the other two made up with males. It has netted the highest combined profits of $981,000.

House	Auction spot	Couple	Reserve	Auction Result	Profit	Total Winnings	Placing spot
1	1	Niki & Tiff	$1,170,000	$1,320,000	$150,000	$150,000	4th
2	3	Dyls & Dylz	$1,190,000	$1,341,000	$151,000	$151,000	3rd
3	2	Emma & Courtney	$1,210,000	$1,510,000	$300,000	$300,000	2nd
4	4	Sam & Emmett	$1,230,000	$1,610,000	$380,000	$480,000	1st

=== Season 6 ===
The sixth season premiered on 25 June 2017. It is set in the Auckland suburbs of Northcote, North Shore. The title of this series is "Side X Side", as each of the houses were large 4-storey townhouses, the largest houses in terms of floor area in The Block NZ. It had a combined profits ($65,000), and it also saw the first time a house did not meet reserve, but got the highest bid on the re-sell.

House	Auction spot	Couple	Reserve	Auction Result	Profit	Total Winnings	Placing spot
1	1	Ling & Zing	$1,299,000	$1,300,000	$1,000	$1,000	4th
2	2 & 5 (Note: House was passed in as the reserve was not met the first time, and then went back to auction after fourth auction was complete.)	Andy & Nate	$1,219,000	$1,250,000	$31,000	$131,000	1st
3	3	Julia & Ali	$1,229,000	$1,242,000	$13,000	$13,000	3rd
4	4	Stace & Yanita	$1,251,000	$1,271,000	$20,000	$20,000	2nd

=== Season 7 ===
The seventh season premiered on 8 July 2018. It is set in the Auckland suburb of Hobsonville. The title of this series is "On Point".

House	Auction spot	Couple	Reserve	Auction Result	Profit	Total Winnings	Placing spot
1	2	Claire & Agni	$920,000	$950,000	$30,000	$30,000	3rd
2	1	Ben & Tom	$930,000	$987,000	$57,000	$57,000	2nd
3	4	Chlo & Em	$910,000	$921,500	$11,500	$11,500	4th
4	3	Amy & Stu	$940,000	$1,009,500	$69,500	$169,500	1st

=== Season 8 ===
The eighth season premiered on 17 June 2019. It is set in the Auckland suburb of Kingsland. The title of this series is "Firehouse", as the contestants are renovating apartments in an old fire station.

Apt	Auction spot	Couple	Reserve	Auction Result	Profit	Total Winnings	Placing spot
1	3	Stacy & Adam	$1,480,000	$1,480,000 (after auction)	$0	$0	2nd
2	1	Lisa & Ribz	$1,290,000	$1,340,000	$50,000	$150,000	1st
3	2	Ethan & Sam	$1,390,000	$1,390,000	$0	$0	2nd
4	4	Sophia & Mikaere	>$1,600,000	$1,600,000 (after auction)	$0	$0	2nd

=== Season 9 ===
The ninth series premiered on 14 June 2021. It is the second season to be set in the Auckland suburb of Point Chevalier. Production began in 2020 but was paused for 13 months due to the COVID-19 pandemic.

House	Auction Spot	Team	Reserve	Auction Result	Profit	Total Winnings	Placing spot
1	4th	Connie & Rach	$2,270,000	$2,692,000	$422,000	$422,000	4th
2	3rd	Meg & Dan	$2,222,000	$2,700,000	$478,000	$478,000	3rd
3	2nd	Dylan & Keegan	$2,155,000	$2,745,000	$590,000	$590,000 + Suzuki Jimny	2nd
4	1st	Tim & Arthur	$2,165,000	$2,825,000	$660,000	$760,000	1st

=== Season 10 ===
The tenth series of The Block premiered on 18 July 2022. It is set in the Auckland server of Orewa, and features contestants from previous seasons.

The series was won by Chloe & Ben, however it is the current lowest auction to date as they only went over the reserve by $4,000, then Maree & James by only $100, whilst the other two teams homes were passed in and received nothing, making only a combined profit of $4,100. After the auction, TSB New Zealand (sponsor of the series) gifted Quinn and Ben, Maree and James & Stacey and Adam with $10,000 each for the hard work and failing to achieve a profit.

House	Auction Spot	Team	Reserve	Auction Result	Profit	Total Winnings	Placing spot
1	2nd	Quinn & Ben	$1.199m	Passed in	$0	$10,000	3rd=
2	4th	Chloe & Ben	$1.141m	$1,145,000	$4000	$104,000	1st
3	3rd	Maree & James	$1.152m	$1,152,100	$100	$10,100 + a Suzuki Vitara JLX	2nd
4	1st	Stacy & Adam	$1.148m	Passed in	$0	$10,000	3rd=
