= The Block NZ season 3 =

The Block NZ
- Season 3
- No. of episodes: 49

Release
- Original network: TV3
- Original release: 26 August – 18 November 2014

Season chronology
- ← Previous; Season 2 Next → Season 4

The third season of The Block NZ premiered on 26 August 2014 and ended on 18 November 2014. It ran four nights per week, Tuesday–Friday.

The season was set in the Auckland suburb of Point Chevalier, and was judged by Home & Garden editor Shelley Ferguson and architect Mark Gascoigne.

== Contestants ==
House	Couple (ages)	Relationship	Hometown
1	Quinn (26) & Ben (30)	Married	Christchurch
2	Maree (27) & James (28)	Partners	South Auckland
3	Alex (29) & Corban (32)	Married	West Auckland
4	Jo (34) & Damo (36)	Married	Feilding

== Kiwibank Block Out Live ==
The season was the first to feature the Kiwibank Block Out Live online game, a bingo-style game designed to be played by viewers watching the show live. It consists of a grid of nine squares, each containing an event or quote from the show. When the event is broadcast, viewers have a few minutes to tap the corresponding square. The first person to unlock all nine squares on a given night won a $100 gift card.

== Controversy ==
In mid-March, Eyeworks, the company that produces The Block NZ, sent letters to households in the area surrounding the future site of the show in Point Chevalier to say that filming would start in late May or early June. Around 20 members of the neighbourhood met to try and prevent the show from being produced there because of safety, traffic, light, and noise concerns. When Eyeworks decided to continue, residents took the production company to court. Although the show was not relocated, restrictions—such as a noise curfew after 6 p.m. and on weekends, and the crew only being able to park in set areas—were put in place.

== Episodes ==
Episode	Week	Title	Original release date
1	1	Episode 1	26 August 2014
In the rear carpark of the Museum of Transport & Technology, teams are presented with a Rush Hour-style array of cars, one of which is their Honda. They must move the other cars—only backwards or forwards, not turning left or right—so that their own can be driven out. Maree & James finish the challenge first, followed by Alex & Corban, Jo & Damo, and, in last place, Quinn & Ben. Teams then drive to a warehouse in Grey Lynn, where they have to traverse three walls: the first by constructing scaffolding; the second by building a frame to climb up, then descending in a scissor lift; and the third by demolishing it with a sledgehammer. They then travel to the Bunnings carpark, where they have to pack a given amount of luggage into their car. After completing the challenge, teams travel to an apartment complex.
2	1	Episode 2	27 August 2014
Teams have 48 hours to design an upmarket hotel suite and build it from just the wooden framework, without the help of any tradespeople. Each team has a prescribed brief to design their room to, with the teams choosing from the four styles in the order they arrived at the complex in the previous episode.
3	1	Episode 3	28 August 2014
Teams finish creating their hotel suite, which are judged by Shelley Ferguson and Mark Gascoigne. As winners, Jo & Damo travel to the site of The Block to decide which team has which house.
4	1	Episode 4	29 August 2014
Jo & Damo choose house 4 and randomly select which houses the other teams have. Quinn & Ben are allocated house 1, Alex & Corban are assigned house 2, and Maree & James are given house 3. They must make their houses waterproof enough for their first night on the building site.
5	2	Episode 5	2 September 2014
Mark announces that teams must renovate their garage. They go to the challenge warehouse to create a piece of wooden furniture to be used in their houses. Jo & Damo build a console table, Quinn & Ben an outdoor lounger, Maree & James a bench planter, and Alex & Corban a retro side table. The challenge is judged by season 1 judge Stewart Harris, who declares Maree & James second, and Alex & Corban the winners. Teams return to the site to continue building their garage.
6	2	Episode 6	3 September 2014
Teams continue renovating their garage.
7	2	Episode 7	4 September 2014
Teams continue renovating their garage. In the middle of renovation, they go to a Point Chevalier beach to construct a raft from plastic sheeting and duct tape, which they sail to a buoy 100 metres offshore and then back, before picking up a red flag from the shore. As winners, Alex & Corban win an 80″ Sharp Quattron Pro TV, while runners-up Jo & Damo win a 70″, and remaining teams Maree & James and Quinn & Ben get a 60″. Back at the building site, Quinn announces that she is pregnant, despite the producers advising her not to get pregnant until The Block has finished filming.
8	2	Episode 8	5 September 2014
Because of the extensive rain, the room reveal date for the garage is extended by five days. Quinn visits an obstetrician to determine if she can continue on The Block, although its verdict is not revealed.
9	3	Episode 9	9 September 2014
Quinn & Ben reveal that Quinn can continue on The Block NZ, but she has certain restrictions placed on her, such as not being able to lift heavy objects.
10	3	Episode 10	10 September 2014
Teams are given a Canon camera to take a photo that they will print on either aluminium, canvas, or glass. Season 2 judge Jeremy Hansen evaluates the photographs and determines Alex & Corban to be the winners. They choose Jo & Damo to join them for the prize dinner. After completing the challenge, teams go to the building site to continue renovating their garages.
11	3	Episode 11	11 September 2014
Season 2 contestants Pete & Andy make a cameo appearance to demonstrate driving a digger for the Freedom Furniture digger challenge before judging it. Each team must drive through a cardboard box obstacle course and pick up four pieces of furniture before placing them on a podium in order of price. Each collided box adds 30 seconds onto the time taken. Alex & Corban finish with a total time of 22:42, Jo & Damo with a time of 22:22, Quinn & Ben with a time of 22:10, and Maree and James with the shortest time of 20:48. As winners, Maree and James get a $5,000 Freedom Furniture gift voucher.
12	3	Episode 12	12 September 2014
Teams finish renovating their garages, which are judged by Shelley Ferguson and Mark Gascoigne. Alex & Corban, with a total score of 18/20, have the highest score and win $4,000 to go towards their budget on The Block.
13	4	Episode 13	16 September 2014
Mark announces that this week's room is a family room, and that teams will score the other teams' rooms out of ten. Out of a possible score of 30, Maree & James get a score of 19, Jo and Damo score 21, Quinn and Ben score 22.5, and Alex and Corban score 24. Mark comments on Alex & Corban's plan for their family room that it doesn't fit the judges' brief of a "family-friendly" room.
14	4	Episode 14	17 September 2014
In the challenge warehouse, teams have four hours to upcycle a chest of drawers to put in their teenager's bedroom. Each team is allocated a Bunning's Warehouse gift voucher worth between $100 and $400. The chests of drawers were judged by Janice Kumar-Ward, a judge from season 2. Maree & James win the challenge, winning a $30,000 bathroom upgrade. Alex & Corban place second, Ben & Quinn third, and Jo & Damo last.
15	4	Episode 15	18 September 2014
Teams head to an indoor rock climbing facility where they must stack crates while the woman on each team climbed up the stack. Because of Quinn's pregnancy, she is unable to participate in the challenge, and The Edge presenter Jay Jay Feeney takes her place. Jo & Damo win the challenge, climbing up 12 crates and winning $5,000 worth of window treatments.
16	4	Episode 16	19 September 2014
Teams finish their family rooms, which are judged. Despite not following the brief, Alex & Corban are not marked down for it.
17	5	Episode 17	23 September 2014
Mark announces that this week's rooms will be the bathrooms and laundry, and Shannon announces that this week will include The Block NZ's ubiquitous Dinner Wars challenge. Alex & Corban are randomly selected to choose the order that the teams present. Each team is assigned an ingredient that must be used. They decide to host their dinner party that night, Jo & Damo second, Quinn & Ben third, and Maree & James last. Alex & Corban, using their compulsory ingredient of bok choy, host their dinner party with an Asian theme. It receives mixed reviews from the other contestants.
18	5	Episode 18	24 September 2014
Jo & Damo host their dinner party with a Grecian and superhero theme. Other teams note how much attention had gone into the food. To entertain the guests, Jo & Damo hire Stephen Witt, a 2014 Nominee for the Billy T Award. The next team to host their dinner party, Ben & Quinn, have rib eye steak as their compulsory ingredient. Their theme is farmyard animals. For entertainment, they have a petting zoo of bearded dragons, rabbits, gerbils and rats. Site foreman Peter Wolfkamp evicts Jo & Damo's head tiler from the site after parking in the wrong place for the third time. Because of this, Jo & Damo have to pay a $975 Auckland Council fine.
19	5	Episode 19	25 September 2014
Maree & James host their dinner party with a Hawaiian theme; their compulsory ingredient was eggplant. The scores from Dinner Wars are revealed, with each team marking the others out of ten for entertainment and ten for cuisine.
20	5	Episode 20	26 September 2014
Other teams have mixed thoughts on Quinn & Ben's scoring. While Maree is bitter, Damo said that it is understandable with Quinn being pregnant, and that he and Jo "would've done the same if [they] had to". Teams finish their rooms, which are judged. Alex & Corban placed first and win the $4,000 prize.
21	6	Episode 21	30 September 2014
Mark announces that the brief for this week's room is a bedroom for a child aged up to 10. That evening, he calls the teams to the courtyard to say that because of the week lost doing the garage, they also have to do a teenager's room, for a child aged at least 16. On top of this, they need to paint their exteriors, because of the scaffolding being taken down.
22	6	Episode 22	1 October 2014
Teams are given 15 minutes with two Point Chevalier Primary students each to listen to their idea of their ideal desk. Maree & James are tasked with building a boat-style desk; Jo & Damo, an aquarium-styled desk; Ben & Quinn, a robot-styled desk; and Alex & Corban, a tree-style desk. Teams are given 3 hours and $400 to construct them. The desks are judged by the winner and runner-up of the "Biggest Blockaholic" competition. They declare Alex & Corban's desk the winner, earning them a $25,000 wardrobe package.
23	6	Episode 23	2 October 2014
At the North Harbour BMX Track in Albany, teams are given three hours to design and construct a bicycle entirely from plywood. Afterwards, they must participate in a relay race to the finish line. Because of Quinn's pregnancy, Jackie Thomas, winner of the first season of The X Factor, races with Ben. Mare & James place first, winning a $2,750 small kitchen appliance pack from Breville, along with $2,000. Jo & Damo place second, Alex & Corban third, and Quinn & Ben last. Back at the building site, teams continue working on their rooms. Alice Pearson, winner of season 2, visits each of the teams and gives them a bit of advice.
24	6	Episode 24	3 October 2014
Teams finish renovating their child's and teenager's bedrooms. The two rooms are judged and scored separately. Maree & James win the child's bedroom, while Alex & Corban win the teenager's bedroom.
25	7	Episode 25	7 October 2014
In the challenge warehouse, Mark announces that this week, teams will be renovating their kitchen and dining room. The contestants visit Peter Hay Kitchens to outline how they want their kitchens to look. Teams judge the other teams' child's room and teenager's separately, and give both a score out of 10. Jo & Damo get the highest score, winning the $1000 prize money.
26	7	Episode 26	8 October 2014
27	7	Episode 27	9 October 2014
28	7	Episode 28	10 October 2014
29	8	Episode 29	14 October 2014
30	8	Episode 30	15 October 2014
31	8	Episode 31	16 October 2014
32	8	Episode 32	17 October 2014
33	9	Episode 33	21 October 2014
Mark announces that teams will renovate the remainder of their interiors this week: their living rooms and entryway, as well as any stairwells, downstairs toilets, and hallways.
34	9	Episode 34	22 October 2014
35	9	Episode 35	23 October 2014
In the leaky box challenge, teams race to plug up a barrel with holes cut in it which is constantly being filled with water. After 14 minutes, as the first team to have the rubber duck in their barrel flow out, Alex & Corban win $3500 of specimen trees. Jo & Damo place second and get $2000, and Maree & James place third and get $1500. Jo & Damo redeem their prize from a previous challenge and go to SkyCity Auckland, where Damo does the SkyJump.
36	9	Episode 36	24 October 2014
All teams but Alex & Corban finish their interiors. Because Alex and Corban's rooms are unfinished, the judges decided not to score them. Each team's living rooms and entryways are scored separately; other miscellaneous rooms that are completed during the week are not judged.
37	10	Episode 37	28 October 2014
38	10	Episode 38	29 October 2014
39	10	Episode 39	30 October 2014
40	10	Episode 40	31 October 2014
41	11	Episode 41	4 November 2014
42	11	Episode 42	5 November 2014
43	11	Episode 43	6 November 2014
44	11	Episode 44	7 November 2014
45	12	Episode 45	11 November 2014
46	12	Episode 46	12 November 2014
47	12	Episode 47	13 November 2014
Teams create a viral video with a personality from MediaWorks Radio stations The Edge and The Rock. Alex & Corban team up with Guy Williams, Jo & Damo with Jono Pryor, Quinn & Ben with Ben Boyce, and Maree & James with Megan Annear.
48	12	Live final	14 November 2014
49	13	"Unlocked"	18 November 2014
Teams talk about their time on The Block.

== Results ==
Teams' progress through the competition
	Scores:	Teams			
	Scores:	Quinn & Ben	Maree & James	Alex & Corban	Jo & Damo
Week	Rooms	Scores			
1	Hotel Suite Challenge	11	13	13	14
2&3	Garage	14.5	13.5	18	15.5
4	Family Room	11.5	14.5	13	14
5	Bathroom & Laundry	13.5	15	17	15.5
6 (a)	Kids Bedroom	12.5	18	17	14
6 (b)	Teenage Bedroom	14.5	17.5	18	14.5
7	Kitchen & Dinning	12.5	15.5	14.5	16
8	Master Bedroom & Ensuite	16	15	18.5	17
9 (a)	Entrance	13.5	12	(Dis) 0	16
9 (b)	Lounge & Rest of Internal	15	16	(Dis) 0	17.5
10	Backyard	12	13.5	15.5	16
11	Front Yard	13.5	12.5	15.5	15.5

=== Winners and losers ===
Week	Room	Judges' verdict			
Week	Room	Winner	Score	Lowest	Score
1	Hotel Suite Challenge	Jo & Damo	14	Quinn & Ben	11
2&3	Garage	Alex & Corban	18	Maree & James	13.5
4	Family Room	Maree & James	14.5	Quinn & Ben	11.5
5	Bathroom & Laundry	Alex & Corban	17	Quinn & Ben	13.5
6 (a)	Kids Bedroom	Maree & James	18	Quinn & Ben	12.5
6 (b)	Teenage Bedroom	Alex & Corban	18	Quinn & Ben/Jo & Damo	14.5
7	Kitchen & Dinning	Jo & Damo	16	Quinn & Ben	12.5
8	Master Bedroom & Ensuite	Alex & Corban	18.5	Maree & James	15
9 (a)	Entrance	Jo & Damo	16	Alex & Corban	(Dis) 0
9 (b)	Lounge & Rest of Internal	Jo & Damo	17.5	Alex & Corban	(Dis) 0
10	Backyard	Jo & Damo	16	Quinn & Ben	12
11	Front Yard	Alex & Corban/Jo & Damo	15.5	Maree & James	12.5

==== Peer reviews ====
At the start of the following week, each couple walks through the other couple's room from the previous week and score them out of 10. The couple that receives the highest total score wins $1000 to go towards their budget.

In week 8, $4,000 was awarded.

Week	Room	Team	Total score	Maximum; possible; total score
2–3	Garage	Alex & Corban	30	30
2–3	Garage	Quinn & Ben	22.5	30
2–3	Garage	Jo & Damo	21	30
2–3	Garage	Maree & James	19	30
4	Family room	Quinn & Ben	21	30
4	Family room	Jo & Damo	20.5	30
4	Family room	Alex & Corban	18	30
4	Family room	Maree & James	12	30
5	Bathroom; Laundry	Jo & Damo	21.5	30
5	Bathroom; Laundry	Maree & James	19	30
5	Bathroom; Laundry	Quinn & Ben	17	30
5	Bathroom; Laundry	Alex & Corban	15.5	30
6	Kid's room; Teenager's room	Jo & Damo	48	60
6	Kid's room; Teenager's room	Quinn & Ben	47.5	60
6	Kid's room; Teenager's room	Maree & James	44	60
6	Kid's room; Teenager's room	Alex & Corban	43.5	60
7	Kitchen; Dining room	Alex & Corban	23.5	30
7	Kitchen; Dining room	Maree & James	22.5	30
7	Kitchen; Dining room	Jo & Damo	22	30
7	Kitchen; Dining room	Quinn & Ben	19	30
8	Master bedroom; Ensuite	Quinn & Ben	22	30
8	Master bedroom; Ensuite	Alex & Corban	20.5	30
8	Master bedroom; Ensuite	Jo & Damo	21	30
8	Master bedroom; Ensuite	Maree & James	18	30
9	Living room; Entryway; Misc. internal areas	Jo & Damo	23	30
9	Living room; Entryway; Misc. internal areas	Maree & James	20.5	30
9	Living room; Entryway; Misc. internal areas	Quinn & Ben	18.5	30
9	Living room; Entryway; Misc. internal areas	Alex & Corban	1	30
10	Backyard	Alex & Corban	24	30
10	Backyard	Jo & Damo	22	30
10	Backyard	Maree & James	19.5	30
10	Backyard	Quinn & Ben	19	30
11	Front yard	TBA	TBA	30
11	Front yard	TBA	TBA	30
11	Front yard	TBA	TBA	30
11	Front yard	TBA	TBA	30

=== Challenges ===
Week	Challenge	Winning couple	Reward
1	Rush Hour Challenge	Maree & James	Time advantage
1	Walls	Maree & James	Time advantage
1	Car Packing	Alex & Corban	First Choice of Hotel Suite Style
2	Wooden Furniture Piece	Alex & Corban	Kitchen Upgrade
2	Duct Tape Boat	Alex & Corban	80″ Sharp Quattron Pro TV
3	Photography Challenge	Alex & Corban	Meal at The Grove Restaurant (with Another Team)
3	Digger Challenge	Maree & James	$5,000 Freedom Furniture Voucher
4	Upcycling	Maree & James	$30,000 Bathroom Upgrade
4	Crate Stacking	Jo & Damo	$5,000 of Window Treatments
5	Dinner Wars	Quinn & Ben	House Exterior Painted by Dulux
6	Styled Desk	Alex & Corban	$25,000 Wardrobe Package
6	Plywood bicycle	Maree & James	$2,000 and a $2,750 Breville Kitchen Appliances Pack
7	Magazine Cover	Maree & James	Vortex Spa Pool
7	Walk the plank	Alex & Corban	$12,000 3 kW ReneSola Solar Package
8	Lamp Challenge	Alex & Corban	Bose Music System & $3,000 Cash
8	Stencil Artwork	Maree & James	Barbecue and $2,000
9	Design Your Own Door	Jo & Damo	$2000 Stay at SkyCity Auckland
9	Leaky Box	Alex & Corban	$3,500 Worth of Specimen Trees
10	Bird House	Alex & Corban	$3,000 & Home Security System
10	Cycling Challenge	Alex & Corban	$3,000 of Outdoor Furniture
11	Tile Replication	Maree & James	$3000 cash
11	Pipeworks	Maree & James	House Cleaned by Greenacres Cleaners
12	Quiz	Jo & Damo	Choose the order that the house are auctioned
12	Swim	Maree & James	Choose the order that the house are auctioned
12	Viral Video	Maree & James	Choose the order that the house are auctioned

==== Dinner Wars ====
Team	Scores								
Team	Alex & Corban		Jo & Damo		Quinn & Ben		Maree & James		Total
Team	Fun	Food	Fun	Food	Fun	Food	Fun	Food	Total
Quinn & Ben	6.5	8.5	7	7	—N/a		6	8.5	43.5
Alex & Corban	—N/a		8	7	5	6.5	8	7	41.5
Jo & Damo	7	7.5	—N/a		5	6.5	7.5	7.5	41
Maree & James	8	6.5	8	6.5	3	2	—N/a		34

==== Week 12 ====
Throughout the first three episodes of week 12, teams competed in three challenges. The winner of each challenge earned 3 points, the runner-up earned 2 points, third place earned 1 point, and fourth place earned 0 points. As winners, Maree & James got to decide the order that the houses were auctioned.

Team	Scores			
Team	Quiz	Swim	Video	Total
Quinn & Ben	2	2	2	6
Maree & James	1	3	3	7
Alex & Corban	0	1	0	1
Jo & Damo	3	0	1	4

=== Auction results ===
As the team that earned the most, Alex & Corban won an extra $80,000. Because Quinn & Ben won so little, and with them starting a family, Alex & Corban gifted them $30,000 of their winnings.

Rank	Couple	Reserve	Auction Result	Profit	Total Winnings	Auction Order
1	Alex & Corban	$1.325m	$1.552m	$227,000	$277,000	1st
2	Maree & James	$1.325m	$1.472m	$147,000	$147,000	2nd
3	Jo & Damo	$1.325m	$1.386m	$61,000	$61,000	4th
4	Quinn & Ben	$1.325m	$1.335m	$10,000	$40,000	3rd
