= House Rules (2003 TV series) =

2003 American television series

House Rules is an American television show hosted by Mark L. Walberg that aired on TBS in 2003. It featured three couples that competed in a 13-week remodeling contest. After doing most of the technical work, the winning team received the home they had just remodeled. The show was sponsored by Lowe's.

Each week, the couples competed to re-model a particular room of their house (all 3 couples re-modeling the same type or room). They would compete in a "budget challenge" to determine who receives the "better budget" and have one week to remodel. at the end of the week a panel of 3 judges viewed the rooms and each gave a score from 1-10. the couple with the highest-scoring winning a prize. In addition, each couple was given a "point chip" (resembling a paint can lid) which they could use one time only to add 1 point to their overall score.

Throughout the series, home viewers voted for which couple should win. The results were revealed on the series finale, the winning couple won their home and a $50,000 cash prize.

During a week in which the couples were to redesign their kitchens, it was found the demolition work the couples had done, was done in an unsafe way. As such that week's competition was delayed. When it was resumed the couples received professional assistance.
