= The Block NZ season 7 =

The Block NZ
- Season 7
- No. of episodes: 49

Release
- Original network: Three
- Original release: 8 July – 30 September 2018

Season chronology
- ← Previous; Season 6 Next → Season 8

The seventh season of New Zealand reality television series The Block NZ, titled The Block NZ: On Point, premiered on 8 July 2018. It is set in the Auckland suburb of Hobsonville Point.

The judges are Kristina Rapley, editor of Your Home and Garden Magazine, and Jason Bonham, who has been the judge on two previous seasons.

== Contestants ==
The teams selected for this season are as follows:

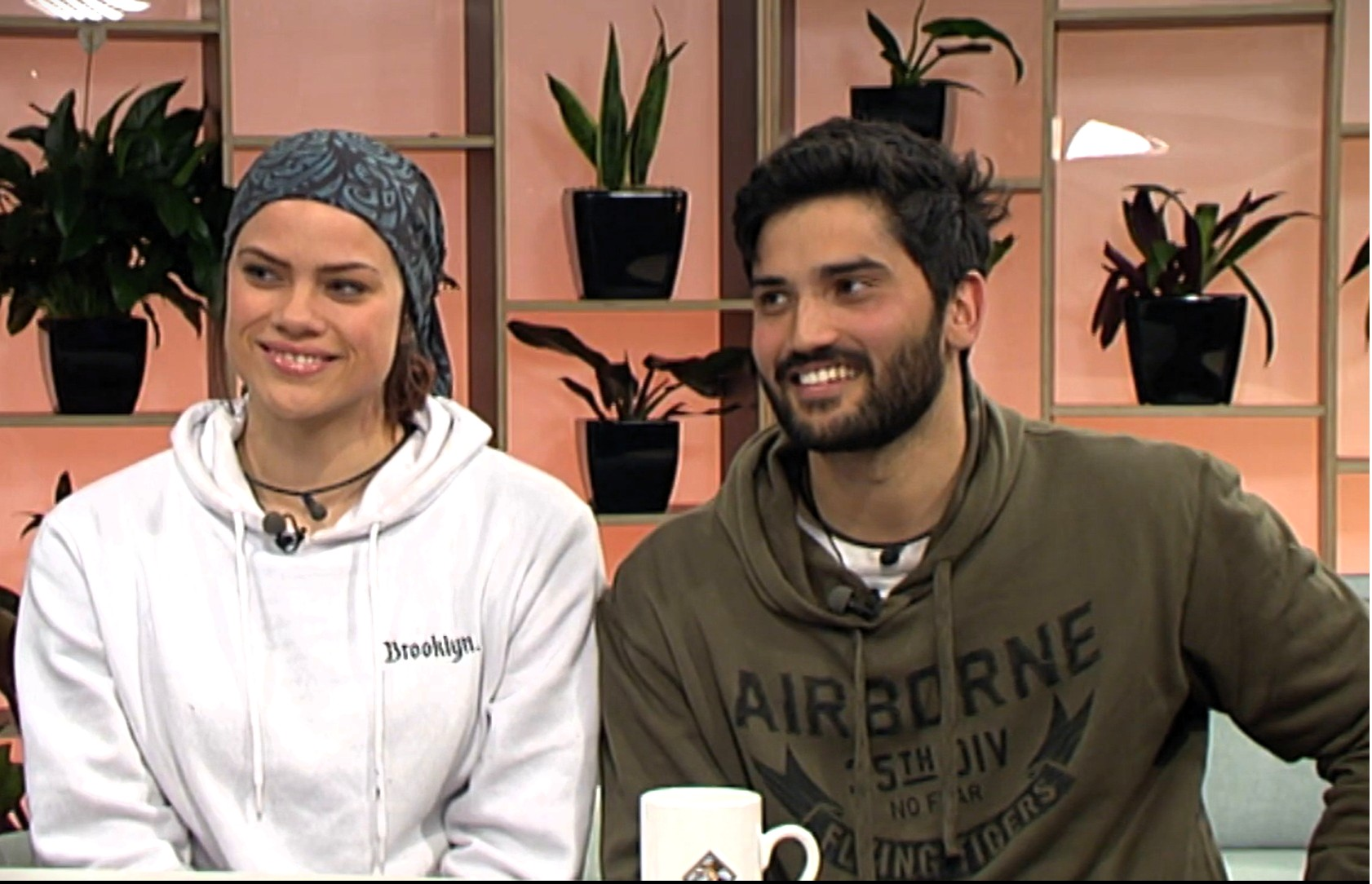
left to right: Claire Rapira and Agni Bhorkar in 2018

House	Couple (ages)	Relationship	Hometown
1	Claire Rapira (26) & Agni Bhorkar (23)	Partners	Hamilton
2	Ben Speedy (24) & Tom Waalkens (24)	Best Mates	Auckland
3	Chloe Hes (25) & Em Blanchett (25)	Besties	Palmerston North
4	Amy Moore (39) & Stu Watts (46)	Partners	Gisborne

== Score history ==
The prize for winning room reveal is $5,000 cash.

Teams' progress through the competition
Scores:		Teams			
Scores:		Claire and Agni	Ben and Tom	Chlo and Em	Amy and Stu
Week	Rooms	Scores (cash spend $)			
1	Guest Bedroom	13 ($8,301.16)	10 ($12,517.76)	13.5 ($10,477.66)	17 ($7,872.92)
2	Main Bathroom	4.5 ($21,389.44)	13 ($20,137.74)	15 ($24,430.06)	20 ($18,600.57)
3	Kids Bedroom	12 ($8,144.43)	15 ($12,408.13)	16.5 ($11,164.03)	21 ($15,814.79)
4	Hallway and Landing	14.5 ($15,954.51)	5.5 ($16,590.44)	11 ($17,059.11)	DSQ ($12,787.32)
5	Living Room	16.5 ($7,754.91)	14 ($9,870.49)	11.5 ($12,397.72)	16 ($10,790.18)
6	Outdoor Patio	13 ($7,927.22	14 ($2,743.25)	13 (&2,090.55)	16 ($7,698.53)
7	Master Bedroom and Ensuite	12.5	6	17	18
8	Garage and Storage Room	12	15.5	9	(15)
9	Kitchen and Dining	12.5	18.5	14.5	17.5
10	Entrance, Stairs and Powder Room	8	7.5	14	18
11	Laundry, Do-Over Room & Touch Ups (Combined Score)	35.5 (17.5/18)	30 (13.5/16.5)	32.5 (16.5/16)	34 (17/17)
12	Outdoors	14	16.5	16	17.5

== Challenges ==
Week	Challenge	Prize	Winner
1	Memory Puzzle Challenge	$5,000 at Freedom Furniture	Ben and Tom
1	The Safe Hunt	Take $5,000 from another team	Amy & Stu
1	Art Challenge	$10,000 kitchen upgrade	Ben and Tom
1	The Mud Race	Outdoor Concepts Wood Burner and an outdoor heater vauled at $5,000	Ben and Tom
1	The Mud Race	2nd Place: Outdoor heater vauled at $1,000	Claire and Agni
1	Game Changer	Power to veto a collective block decision	Ben and Tom
2	Tile Mosaic Table Top Challenge	$2,500 of tiles + $2,500 of tiler labour	Claire and Agni
2	Build and Race a Boat	$5,000 of art from the Art Bureau Gallery	Ben and Tom
2	Toilet SuDoKu	Game changer plus 1	Chlo and Em
3	Dinner Wars	Exterior of house painted	Ben and Tom
4	Tower Undo Challenge	55" QLED smart TV	Amy & Stu
4	Bosch Animal cut-out challenge	Bosch tool wall	Amy & Stu
4	Face Portrait	Game changer minus 1 + 1 hour labour from losing team (Amy & Stu)	Chlo and Em
5	Freedom table setting challenge	6 Burner outdoor BBQ and pizza oven	Chlo and Em
5	Resene Kids Playhouse Challenge	$5,000 worth of ocean weave outdoor furniture	Chlo and Em
5	Resene Kids Playhouse Challenge	$5,000 worth of ocean weave outdoor furniture	Ben and Tom
5	The Meme	Breville Kitchen Pricepack + Secret Advantage	Ben and Tom
6	Icing On The Cake Challenge	Bosch Laundry Upgrade	Claire and Agni
6	Hirepool DIY Challenge	Custom Curtains Worth $5000	Claire and Agni
6	Partygames Katapult Challenge	Alarmsystem + Document Save & minus 1 game changer	Amy & Stu
7	Home Made Soap Challenge	Air Purifier + $7250 Cash	Claire and Agni
7	Walk The Plank Challenge	Luxury HotSpring Spa Package + Extra's	Ben and Tom
7	Scrabble	Plus 1	Ben and Tom
8	Block Stars	$10000 Worth of Trade Labor + Take Another Team Out Of Room Reveal	Chlo and Em
8	Calendar Challenge	Plus 1	Chlo and Em
8	Marblerun	Minus 1 + 5 star Treatment at the Grand Milenium	Claire and Agni
9	Floor Challenge	$5000 Worth Piece of Art	Ben and Tom
9	Birdman Challenge	$10000 of Outdoor Lighting ($5000 for 2nd place (Amy & Stu))	Ben and Tom
9	Marshmallow Tower Challenge	Minus 1 + Undo Card	Claire and Agni
10	The Great Block Rally	Wireless Home Automation System	Amy & Stu
10	Fair and Sheepish	$2000	All teams
10	Ladder Golf	Winning Score x10 in Cash & Plus 1	Claire and Agni
11	Ronald McDonald Makeover Challenge	No Prize	All teams
11	Hungry Hungry Blockers	Minus 1	Claire and Agni
12	Gavl Online Auction	1)Massage 2)$500 3)Minus 2 4)$2500 5)$5000	1)Tom & Ben 2)Tom & Ben 3)Chlo & Em 4)Claire & Agni 5)Amy & Stu
12	Nosey Neighbors	Decide Auction Order	Ben and Tom

== Team Judging ==
The prize for team judging was $2,000 cash.

Week	Room	Scores			
Week	Room	Chloe & Emily	Amy & Stu	Ben & Tom	Claire & Agni
1	Guest Bedroom	24.5	20.5	22.5	16.5
2	Main Bathroom				
3	Kids Bedroom				
4	Hallway and Landing				
5	Living Room	23	16.5	15	14
6	Outdoor Patio				
7	Master Bedroom and Ensuite	23	19.5	23.5	18.5
8	Garage and Storage Room	12	20	19.5	18
9	Kitchen and Dining	24	16.5	16.5	18.5
10	Entrance, Stairs and Powder Room				
11	Re-do Room	21.5	21.5	21.5	20
12	Outdoors				

== Auction ==
House	Auction spot	Couple	Reserve	Auction Result	Profit	Total Winnings	Placing spot
1	2	Claire & Agni	$920,000	$950,000	$30,000	$30,000	3rd
2	1	Ben & Tom	$930,000	$987,000	$57,000	$57,000	2nd
3	4	Chlo & Em	$910,000	$921,500	$11,500	$11,500	4th
4	3	Amy & Stu	$940,000	$1,009,500	$69,500	$169,500	1st
