= Mark Richardson (cricketer) =

New Zealand cricketer / TV host

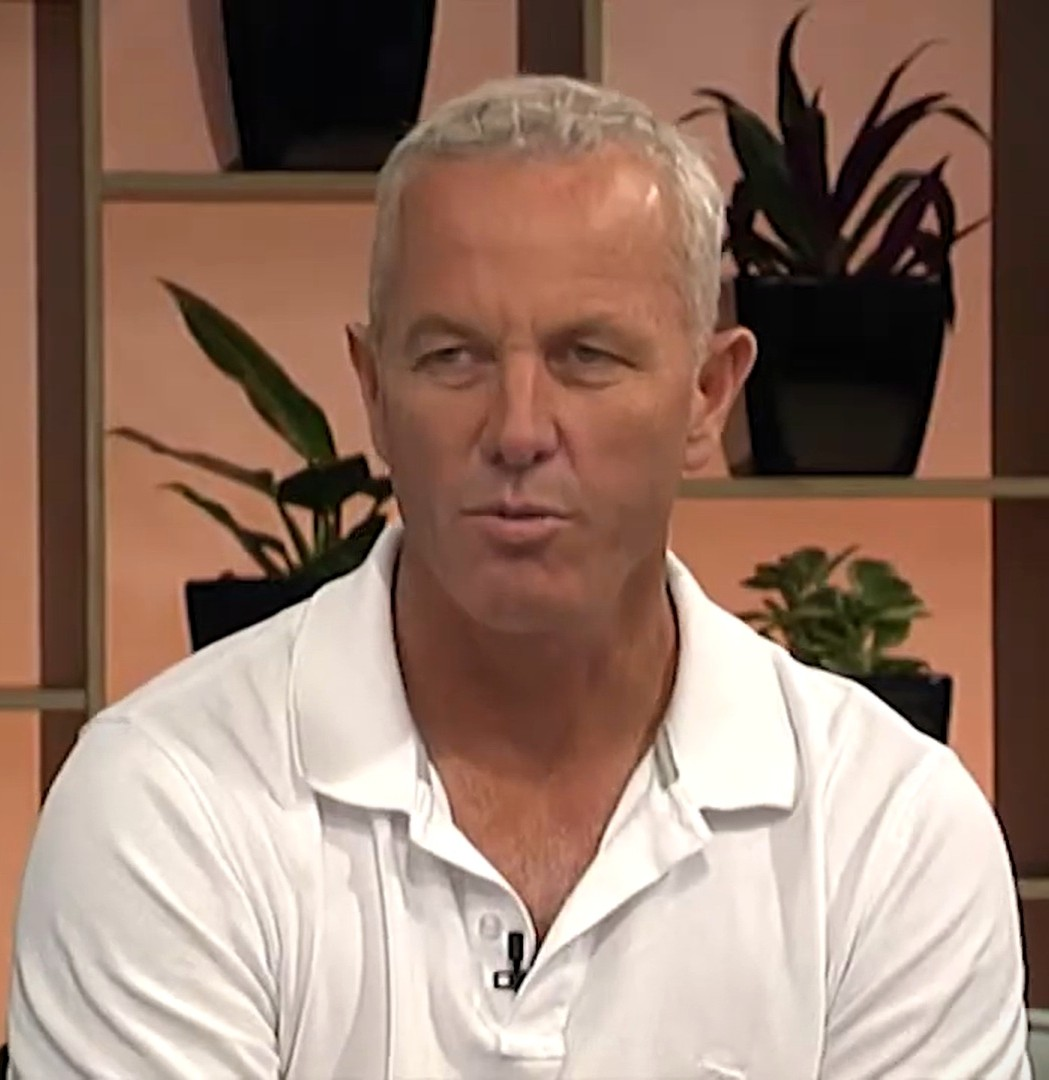
- Richardson in 2018

Personal information
- Full name: Mark Hunter Richardson
- Born: 11 June 1971 (age 55); Hastings, New Zealand
- Nickname: Rigor
- Batting: Left-handed
- Bowling: Slow left arm orthodox
- Role: Batsman

International information
- National side: New Zealand (2000–2004)
- Test debut (cap 210): 12 September 2000 v Zimbabwe
- Last Test: 30 November 2004 v Australia
- ODI debut (cap 125): 11 January 2002 v Australia
- Last ODI: 19 January 2002 v South Africa
- ODI shirt no.: 35

Domestic team information
- Years: Team
- 1989/90–1991/92: Auckland
- 1992/93–2000/01: Otago
- 2001: Buckinghamshire
- 2001/02–2004/05: Auckland

Career statistics
Competition	Test	ODI	FC	LA
Matches	38	4	157	91
Runs scored	2,776	42	9,994	2,523
Batting average	44.77	10.50	42.89	31.53
100s/50s	4/19	0/0	20/48	3/15
Top score	145	26	306	128*
Balls bowled	66	0	3,966	810
Wickets	1	–	44	12
Bowling average	21.00	–	43.43	49.33
5 wickets in innings	0	–	1	0
10 wickets in match	0	–	0	0
Best bowling	1/16	–	5/77	2/25
Catches/stumpings	26/–	1/–	90/–	16/–
- Source: Cricinfo, 29 April 2017

Mark Hunter Richardson (born 11 June 1971) is a former New Zealand cricketer. He was a left-handed opening batsman. He represented New Zealand in 38 Test matches between 2000 and 2004. During his cricketing career he played for Auckland, Buckinghamshire and Otago as well as for Dunedin Metropolitan in the Hawke Cup.

== International career ==
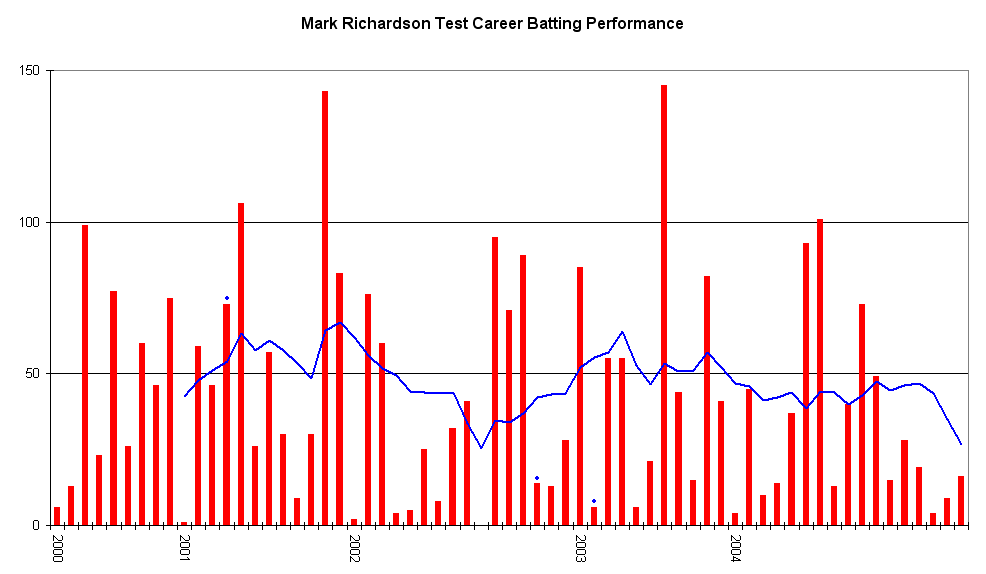
An innings-by-innings breakdown of Richardson's Test match batting career, showing runs scored (red bars) and the average of the last ten innings (blue line).

Richardson began his career as a left-arm spinner, batting at number 10. As his bowling ability declined, he worked on developing his batting, to the point where he was selected as an opening batsman for New Zealand, at age 29. His dour approach to batting – he described the range of shots he played as "the straight drive, the forward defensive and 27 variations on the leave" – provided vital stability to New Zealand's batting order at a time when they were notorious for collapses.

Richardson scored 2776 Test runs at an average of 44.77, including four centuries and 19 fifties. His sole Test wicket came in a match against Pakistan in 2001, dismissing Mohammad Yousuf, then known as Yousuf Youhana, caught and bowled for 203.

His nickname Rigor is short for Rigor Mortis and was given to him in 1996 by Shane Bond because Bond thought he moved with the speed and agility of a dead man. In addition to his slow running, Richardson was also noted for developing (in conjunction with the Beige Brigade) a tradition to challenge the slowest runner of the opposing side to a running race at the conclusion of each tour. In his first race he beat Australia's Darren Lehmann. He has since raced Pakistan leg-spinner Danish Kaneria, South Africa's Neil McKenzie and England's Ashley Giles, only beating Kaneria. The Beige Brigade also supplied Richardson with a long-sleeved and hooded running suit in the New Zealand teams 1980s beige and brown colours.

On 16 October 2003, Richardson was batting against India in Mohali when he suffered a severe leg cramp after playing a sweep shot, forcing him onto the ground and yelling in agony. The spectacle and its replays amused the crowd and the players during the subsequent break in play.

He retired from all forms of cricket in December 2004, saying he could not sustain the intensity needed to compete at international level. He noted that he finished with "a Test bowling average that is better than Sir Richard Hadlee's (22.29), and a 50-50 record in the end-of-series running race." He scored 9,994 first-class runs during his career, remarked that the tally was "only different from Donald Bradman's Test batting average by a decimal point" (Bradman finished his career with an average of 99.94).

== After cricket ==
Richardson was a cricket commentator for SKY Sports from 2006 to 2020, and he has been a commentator for Spark Sport and TVNZ since 2020. He co-hosted Prime show The Crowd Goes Wild with Andrew Mulligan from February 2006 to December 2016. He hosted The Block NZ from 2012 until its axing in 2024, and was the sport presenter on The AM Show from February 2017 to December 2021. He was also an afternoon talkback host with Leah Panapa on Today FM from March 2022 to March 2023. Previously, he has been a breakfast radio announcer for The Sound and Radio Sport (with a radio-based show of The Crowd Goes Wild). He continues to do part-time radio work on Sport Nation in New Zealand and a full-time financial advisor for Forsyth Barr in Auckland.

Richardson has commented in the media in defense of Donald Trump, saying in July 2018, "people need to give [Trump] a shot". He has been highly critical of Prime Minister Jacinda Ardern's decision to have a child in office. He was criticised for saying previously that "being a mum is not a job".

After the 2018 Budget, Richardson told his tenants live on air that their rent would be going up to compensate him for losses due to the Government's budget.
