= List of Amazon MGM Studios television programs =

This is a list of television programs that are produced by Amazon MGM Studios and its predecessors.

== MGM Television ==
This is a list of television series produced or distributed by MGM Television. The first half is owned by Warner Bros. Television Studios through Turner Entertainment Co. and the second is owned by MGM itself.

=== Pre-1985 shows ===
Note: (*) Denotes public domain.

- MGM Parade (1955–1956)
- The Thin Man (1957–1959)* (Based on the 1934 film and its sequels by MGM) (co-production with Clarington Productions)
- Northwest Passage (1958–1959)*
- National Velvet (1960–1962) (co-production with Velvet Productions) (Based on the 1944 film of the same name by MGM)
- The Best of the Post (1960)
- The Islanders (1960–1961)
- The Asphalt Jungle (1961)
- Cain's Hundred (1961–1962) (co-production with Vandas Productions)
- Dr. Kildare (1961–1966) (Based on the 1937 movie Internes Can't Take Money and its sequels by MGM) (co-production with Arena Productions)
- Father of the Bride (1961–1962) (Based on the 1950 film and its sequel by MGM)
- Sam Benedict (1962–1963)
- The Eleventh Hour (1962–1964) (co-production with Arena Productions)
- The Lieutenant (1963–1964) (co-production with Arena Productions)
- Harry's Girls (1963)
- The Travels of Jaimie McPheeters (1963–1964)
- Mr. Novak (1963–1965)
- Flipper (1964–1967) (co-production with Ivan Tors Films)
- Made in America (1964)
- Many Happy Returns (1964–1965) (co-production with Lindabob Productions)
- The Man from U.N.C.L.E. (1964–1968) (co-production with Arena Productions)
- A Man Called Shenandoah (1965–1966) (co-production with Bronze Enterprises)
- Please Don't Eat the Daisies (1965–1967) (Based on the 1960 movie of the same name by MGM)
- Tom and Jerry (1965–1972) (co-production with MGM Animation/Visual Arts & M-G-M Cartoon Studio unit)
- Daktari (1966–1969) (co-production with Ivan Tors Films)
- Preview Tonight (1966) (episode "Seven Good Years and Seven Lean")
- The Rounders (1966–1967)
- The Girl from U.N.C.L.E. (1966–1967) (co-production with Arena Productions)
- Jericho (1966–1967) (co-production with Arena Productions)
- The Forsyte Saga (1967) (mini)
- Off to See the Wizard (1967–1968) (Based on The Wizard of Oz)
- Hondo (1967) (Based on the 1953 film by Warner Bros.) (co-production with Batjac Productions and Fenady Associates, Inc.)
- Maya (1967–1968) (Based on the 1966 film by MGM) (co-production with King Bros. Productions)
- Then Came Bronson (1969–1970)
- The Courtship of Eddie's Father (1969–1972) (Based on the 1960 film by MGM)
- Medical Center (1969–1976) (co-production with Alfra Productions)
- Young Dr. Kildare (1972)
- Assignment Vienna (1972)
- Hello Mother, Goodbye! (1973 pilot for NBC starring Bette Davis)
- Adam's Rib (1973) (Based on the 1949 film by MGM)
- Hawkins (1973–1974) (co-production with Arena Productions)
- The Tom & Jerry Show (1975) (in association with Hanna-Barbera Productions)
- Bronk (1975–1976) (co-production with Carnan-Becker Productions)
- The Practice (1976–1977) (co-production with Danny Thomas Productions)
- The Montefuscos (1975) (co-production with Persky-Denoff Enterprises)
- Jigsaw John (1976)
- Executive Suite (1976–1977)
- How the West Was Won (1977, 1978, 1979) (mini)
- CHiPs (1977–1983) (co-production with Rosner Television)
- Logan's Run (1977–1978) (Based on the 1976 film by MGM) (co-production with Goff-Roberts-Steiner Productions)
- Lucan (1977–1978)
- The French Atlantic Affair (1979) (mini)
- Beyond Westworld (1980) (co-production with Lou Shaw Productions)
- The Tom and Jerry Comedy Show (1980–1982) (co-production with Filmation Associates)
- The Tom and Jerry Hour (1981–1984) (in association with Filmation Associates)
- McClain's Law (1981–1982) (co-production with Eric Bercovici Productions)
- Chicago Story (1982) (co-production with Eric Bercovici Productions)
- Gavilan (1982–1983) (co-production with Mandy Films)
- Meatballs & Spaghetti (1982) (produced by InterMedia Entertainment Company and Marvel Productions)
- Pandamonium (1982) (produced by Marvel Productions and InterMedia Entertainment Company)
- Gilligan's Planet (1982–1983) (in association with Filmation Associates) (An expansion of the TV series Gilligan's Island by Sherwood Schwartz Productions, Gladasya Productions, CBS Productions, and United Artists Television)
- Seven Brides for Seven Brothers (1982–1983) (Based on the 1954 film by Metro-Goldwyn-Mayer (co-production with David Gerber Productions)
- Cutter to Houston (1983) (co-production with Cypress Point Productions)
- Thicke of the Night (1983) (co-production with InterMedia Entertainment Company, Thickovit Productions, Inc. and Metromedia Producers Corporation)
- The Yearing (1983–1985) (Based on the 1946 film by MGM) (produced by MK Company)
- Empire (1984)
- Jessie (1984) (co-production with Lindsay Wagner-David Gerber Productions)
- Mighty Orbots (1984–1985) (in association with InterMedia Entertainment and TMS Entertainment)

Note: Flipper, produced between 1964 and 1967, was later acquired by The Samuel Goldwyn Company, and is currently owned and distributed by its successor MGM Television, which originally produced the series.

=== Post-1985 shows ===
Title	Years	Network	Notes
Fame	1982–1987	NBC; Syndication	co-production with Eilenna Productions; Based on the 1980 film by Metro-Goldwyn-Mayer
We Got It Made	1983–1988	NBC; Syndication	co-production with InterMedia Entertainment Company and The Farr Organization Inc. Syndicated episodes co-produced with Twenty Paws Productions and The Fred Silverman Company
George Washington	1984	CBS	miniseries; co-production with David Gerber Productions
Paper Dolls	1984	ABC	co-production with Mandy Films
Pink Panther and Sons	1984–1985	NBC	co-production with Hanna-Barbera Productions, and Mirisch-Geoffrey-DePatie-Freleng
Kids Incorporated	1984–1994	Syndication/Disney Channel	co-production with Lynch/Biller Productions (1984–1989), Hal Roach Studios (1985–1987), Lynch Entertainment (1991–1994), K-Tel Entertainment (1984), Qintex Entertainment (1988–1989) and RHI Entertainment (1991–1994)
Lady Blue	1985–1986	ABC	co-production with David Gerber Productions
The Twilight Zone	1985–1989	CBS/Syndication	Revival of the 1959 TV series by Cayuga Productions and CBS Productions; MGM/UA Television distributed the third season Currently distributed by CBS Media Ventures
Jack and Mike	1986–1987	ABC	co-production with David Gerber Productions
Karen's Song	1987	Fox	
Hello Kitty's Furry Tale Theater	1987–1988	CBS	co-production with DIC Enterprises
Sea Hunt	1987–1988	Syndication	Revival of the 1958 TV series by Ziv Television Programs
Thirtysomething	1987–1991	ABC	co-production with The Bedford Falls Company
Baby Boom	1988–1989	NBC	co-production with Nancy Meyers-Charles Shyer Productions and Finnegan/Pinchuk Productions; Based on the 1987 film by United Artists
In the Heat of the Night	1988–1994	NBC/CBS	co-production with The Fred Silverman Company and Jadda Productions (later renamed as Juanita Bartlett Productions); Based on the 1967 film by United Artists
Group One Medical	1988–1989	Syndication	
Knightwatch	1988–1989	ABC	co-production with Astor III Productions
Straight to the Heart	1989	Syndication	
Dream Street	1989	NBC	co-production with The Bedford Falls Company
The Young Riders	1989–1992	ABC	co-production with Ogiens/Kane Company
Against the Law	1990–1991	Fox	co-production with Sarabande Productions and Daniel H. Blatt Productions
Dark Shadows	1991	NBC	co-production with Dan Curtis Productions; Revival of the 1966 TV series
James Bond Jr.	1991–1992	Syndication	co-production with United Artists, Mac B, Danjaq and Murakami-Wolf-Swenson; Distributed by Claster Television and ad sales handled by Camelot Entertainment Sales
Mother Goose and Grimm	1991–1992	CBS	co-production with Lee Mendelson Film Productions, Grimmy, Inc., Tribune Media Services and Film Roman; No longer distributed by MGM; currently owned by the estate of Lee Mendelson
Grapevine	1992	CBS	co-production with Corkscrew Productions and CBS Entertainment Productions
Nightmare Cafe	1992	NBC	co-production with Wes Craven Films
The Pink Panther	1993–1995	Syndication	co-production with Metro-Goldwyn-Mayer Animation, United Artists and Mirisch-Geoffrey-DePatie-Freleng; Distributed by Claster Television and ad sales handled by Camelot Entertainment Sales
The Outer Limits	1995–2002	Showtime/Sci Fi	co-production with Trilogy Entertainment Group, Atlantis Films (seasons 1–4) and Alliance Atlantis (seasons 5–7); Revival of the 1963 TV series by United Artists Television
LAPD: Life on the Beat	1995–1999	Syndication	co-produced by QRZ Media
The New Adventures of Flipper	1995–2000	Syndication	continued from Samuel Goldwyn Television co-production with Village Roadshow Pictures Television, Coote-Hayes Productions and Tribune Entertainment
Poltergeist: The Legacy	1996–1999	Showtime/Sci Fi	co-production with Pacific Motion Pictures and Trilogy Entertainment Group; Based on the 1982 film Poltergeist and its sequels by Metro-Goldwyn-Mayer
All Dogs Go to Heaven: The Series	1996–1999	Syndication	co-production with Metro-Goldwyn-Mayer Animation; Distributed by Claster Television; Based on the 1989 film All Dogs Go to Heaven and its sequel by Metro-Goldwyn-Mayer
Dead Man's Gun	1997–1999	Showtime	co-production with Sugar Entertainment
Stargate SG-1	1997–2007	Showtime/Sci Fi	co-production with Double Secret Productions, Gekko Film Corp. (seasons 1–8) and Sony Pictures Television (season 9); Based on the 1994 film Stargate by Metro-Goldwyn-Mayer and Carolco Pictures
Fame L.A.	1997–1998	Syndication	co-production with Trilogy Entertainment Group
The Magnificent Seven	1998–2000	CBS	co-production with Trilogy Entertainment Group and The Mirisch Corporation; Based on the 1960 film by United Artists
RoboCop: Alpha Commando	1998–1999	Syndication	co-production with Fireworks Entertainment, Metro-Goldwyn-Mayer Animation and Orion Pictures; Distributed by The Summit Media Group; Based on the 1987 film RoboCop by Orion Pictures
The Lionhearts	1998–2000	Syndication	co-production with Metro-Goldwyn-Mayer Animation; Distributed by Claster Television; Based on Leo the Lion
National Enquirer TV	1999–2001	Syndication	co-production with Bogorad/Wyler Productions
Sex Wars	2000–2001	Syndication	distribution only; produced by Lighthearted Entertainment
Leap Years	2001–2002	Showtime	co-production with Temple Street Productions
Jeremiah	2002–2004	Showtime	co-production with Lions Gate Television, Showtime Networks, Platinum Studios, Jeremiah Productions, Inc. and J. Michael Straczynski Productions
She Spies	2002–2004	NBC/Syndication	co-produced by Reno and Osborn Productions (episodes 1–2), Tower 18 Productions (season 2) and NBC Enterprises
Stargate Infinity	2002–2003	Fox; Disney Channel France; M6	co-production with Les Studios Tex S.A.R.L. and DIC Entertainment
Fame	2003	NBC	co-production with Stone Stanley Entertainment; Based on the 1980 film by Metro-Goldwyn-Mayer
Chappelle's Show	2003–2006	Comedy Central	distribution only from 2007 produced by Pilot Boy Productions, Marobru Productions and Comedy Partners
Dead Like Me	2003–2005	Showtime	co-production with John Masius Productions
Animal Atlas	2004–2015	Syndication	co-produced by Longneedle Entertainment; distributed by Debmar-Mercury until 2009
Stargate Atlantis	2004–2009	Sci Fi	co-production with Acme Shark and Sony Pictures Television (season 2)
Barbershop: The Series	2005	Showtime	co-production with State Street Pictures, International Famous Players, Radio Pictures Corporation and Cube Vision based on the 2002 film Barbershop by Metro-Goldwyn-Mayer
Safari Tracks	2005–2006	Syndication	co-produced by Longneedle Entertainment; Co-distributed by Debmar-Mercury until 2009
Dante's Cove	2005–2007	Here TV	distribution only
Sports Action Team	2006–2007	NBC O&Os/HDNet/Syndication	distribution only for season 2 produced by Towers Productions, Inc., NBC 5 Chicago, NBC Television Stations Division (2006) and NBC Local Media (2007)
American Gladiators	2008	NBC	co-production with Flor-Jon Films, Reveille Productions and Room 403 Productions; Based on the 1989 TV series by The Samuel Goldwyn Company
Spaceballs: The Animated Series	2008	G4	co-producer with Berliner Film Companie, Brooksfilms, Fantasy Prone Interactive and G4 Media; Based on the 1987 film by Metro-Goldwyn-Mayer
First Business	2008–2014	Syndication	distribution only as part of This TV programming deal with program producer Weigel Broadcasting
Stargate Universe	2009–2011	Syfy	co-production with Acme Shark
Pink Panther and Pals	2010	Cartoon Network/Boomerang	co-production with Desert Panther Productions, Mirisch-Geoffrey-DePatie-Freleng and Rubicon Studios
Cash Cab	2010–2015	Discovery Channel	syndicated repeats of Discovery Channel series
Teen Wolf	2011–2017	MTV	co-production with MTV Production Development, First Cause, Inc., Adelstein Productions, Siesta Productions, Lost Marbles Television and DiGa Vision; Based on the 1985 movie of the same name, its sequel, and the TV series by Atlantic Releasing Corporation
Vikings	2013–2020	History (Canada)	co-production with TM Productions, Take 5 Productions, Octagon Films (seasons 1–4), Shaw Media (seasons 1–4) and Corus Entertainment (seasons 4–6)
Right This Minute	2013–2022	Syndication	distribution only from 2013–2016 produced by MagicDust Television, Gray Television, Cox Media Group and E.W. Scripps Company distribution continued by Disney–ABC Domestic Television in 2016
CeeLo Green's The Good Life	2014	TBS	distribution only produced by Emerald TV Productions and Rogue Atlas Productions
Fargo	2014–2024	FX	co-production with FXP, 26 Keys Productions, The Littlefield Company, Nomadic Pictures (2014–2017) and Mike Zoss Productions (2014–2015); Based on the 1996 film by PolyGram Filmed Entertainment
How'd You Get So Rich? UK	2017	Channel 4	co-production with CPL Productions
The Handmaid's Tale	2017–2025	Hulu	co-production with Daniel Wilson Productions, Inc., Toluca Pictures (seasons 5–6), The Littlefield Company and White Oak Pictures
Get Shorty	2017–2019	Epix	co-production with Holmes Quality Yarns; Based on the 1995 film by Metro-Goldwyn-Mayer
Stargate Origins	2018	Stargate Command	co-production with United Artists Digital Studios and New Form
Condor	2018–2020	Audience/Epix	co-production with Skydance Television, Paramount Television Studios and Apophasis Unproductions; Based on the 1975 film Three Days of the Condor by Paramount Pictures and Dino De Laurentiis Corporation
The Truth About the Harry Quebert Affair	2018	Epix	miniseries; co-production with Eagle Pictures, Muse Entertainment, Old Friends Productions, Barbary Films and Repērage
Luis Miguel: The Series	2018–2021	Telemundo/Netflix	co-production with Gato Grande Productions
Perpetual Grace, LTD	2019	Epix	co-production with Escape Artists, Chi-Town Pictures, Elephant Pictures and FXP
Four Weddings and a Funeral	2019	Hulu	co-production with Universal Television, Kaling International, Philoment Media and 3 Arts Entertainment; Based on the 1994 film of the same name by PolyGram Filmed Entertainment
Mr. Mom	2019	Vudu	Based on the 1983 film by Sherwood Productions
Messiah	2020	Netflix	co-production with Think Pictures Inc. and Industry Entertainment Partners
Laurel Canyon	2020	Epix	co-production with Jigsaw Productions (copyright holder), The Kennedy/Marshall Company, Amblin Television and Warner Music Entertainment
Helter Skelter: An American Myth	2020	Epix	co-production with Invented By Girls, Rogue Atlas, Berlanti Productions and Warner Horizon Television
Country Ever After	2020	Netflix	co-production with Evolution Media and Lightworkers Media
Clarice	2021	CBS	co-production with CBS Studios, Secret Hideout, Tiny Core of Rage Entertainment and The Elizabeth Diaries; Based on the 1990 movie The Silence of the Lambs by Orion Pictures
Fall River	2021	Epix	co-production with Blumhouse Television and Pyramid Productions
Fiasco	2021	MGM+	co-production with Prologue Projects and Left/Right Productions
From	2022–present	MGM+	co-production with MGM+ Studios, Gozie AGBO and Midnight Radio
Vikings: Valhalla	2022–2024	Netflix	co-production with Metropolitan Films International, Toluca Pictures (seasons 2–3) and History
Billy the Kid	2022–2025	MGM+	co-production with MGM+ Studios, Amblin Television, One Big Picture (season 1) and De Line Pictures
Last Night	2022	Peacock	co-production with Make It Happen Studio, Re Invent Studio and Entertainment 360
The Reunion	2022	France 2	co-production with Make It Happen Studio, Rai Fiction, ZDF and France Télévisions
Wednesday	2022–present	Netflix	co-production with Millar Gough Ink, Toluca Pictures and Tim Burton Productions
The Consultant	2023	Amazon Prime Video	co-production with Toluca Pictures, 1.21 Films, Dolphin Black Productions and Amazon Studios
Justified: City Primeval	2023	FX	co-production with Rooney McP Productions, Dave & Ron Productions, Timberman/Beverly Productions, Olybomb Productions, FXP and Sony Pictures Television Studios
Harlan Coben's Shelter	2023	Amazon Prime Video	co-production with Final Twist Productions and Amazon Studios
Desperately Seeking Soulmate: Escaping Twin Flames Universe	2023	Amazon Prime Video	co-production with Dorothy Street Pictures, Escape Artists, PMZ Pictures and Amazon Studios
The Bombing of Pan Am 103	2025	BBC One/Netflix	co-production with World Productions, Toluca Pictures, Wild Card Films and Night Train Media
DTF St. Louis	2026	HBO	co-production with Escape Artists, Aggregate Films and Bravo Axolotl
The Testaments	2026	Hulu	co-production with Daniel Wilson Productions, White Oak Pictures, Toluca Pictures and The Littlefield Company
American Gladiators	TBA	Amazon Prime Video	co-production with Flor-Jon Films, Evolution Media and Big Fish Entertainment
Bloodaxe	TBA	Amazon Prime Video	co-production with Toluca Pictures and O'Sullivan Productions
Business Hunters	TBA	CNBC	co-production with Evolution Media
El Gato	TBA	Amazon Prime Video	co-production with Azteca Productions, Three Amigos Productions, Toluca Pictures and 1.21 Films
Halcyon	TBA	Amazon Prime Video	co-production with Metronome Film Company and 1.21 Films
Highfire	TBA	Paramount+	co-production with 1.21 Films
Jane Smith	TBA	HBO Max	co-production with Paramount Television Studios, Big Picture Co., James Patterson Entertainment, David E. Kelley Productions
The Book of Cold Cases	TBA	TBA	co-production with Toluca Pictures
The Life Cycle of the Common Octopus	TBA	TBA	co-production with Escape Artists
My Mom's Murder	TBA	TBA	co-production with AYR Media, Audible and Toluca Pictures
Park Avenue	TBA	TBA	co-production with Escape Artists
The Sicilian Inheritance	TBA	TBA	co-production with Rebelle Media

== MGM+ Studios ==
Formerly known as Epix Studios LLC until 2023.

Title	Years	Network	Notes
By Whatever Means Necessary: The Times of Godfather of Harlem	2020	Epix	miniseries
Bridge and Tunnel	2021–22	Epix	co-production with Marlboro Road Gang Productions
Fall River	2021	Epix	co-production with MGM Television, Blumhouse Television and Pyramid Productions
Chapelwaite	2021	Epix	co-production with De Line Pictures
Fiasco	2021	Epix	co-production with MGM Television, Prologue Projects and Left/Right Productions
Mr. A & Mr. M: The Story of A&M Records	2021	Epix	miniseries
From	2022–present	MGM+	co-production with MGM Television, Gozie AGBO and Midnight Radio; Distributed by Paramount Global Content Distribution
Billy the Kid	2022–2025	MGM+	co-production with MGM Television, Amblin Television, One Big Picture and De Line Pictures
Blumhouse's Compendium of Horror	2022	Epix	miniseries
Murf the Surf	2023	MGM+	miniseries; co-production with Imagine Documentaries and This Machine Filmworks
Amityville: An Origin Story	2023	MGM+	miniseries
Domina	2023	MGM+	season 2; co-production with Tiger Aspect and Cattleya; Rights held by Banijay Rights
San Francisco Sounds: A Place in Time	2023	MGM+	miniseries; co-production with Jigsaw Productions, K/M Documentaries, Amblin Television, FourScore Productions, Sony Music Entertainment and Warner Music Entertainment
Psycho: The Lost Tapes of Ed Gein	2023	MGM+	miniseries
Beacon 23	2023–2024	MGM+	co production with Peephole Productions (season 2), Platform One Media (season 2), Boat Rocker Media (owner), Spectrum Originals (season 2) and Studio 8 Television (season 2)
Hotel Cocaine	2024	MGM+	co-production with Chris Brancato Inc.
Earth Abides	2024	MGM+	miniseries; co-production with Brightlight Pictures, Lighthouse Productions, Peak TV and Guy Walks Into a Bar
Nine Bodies in a Mexican Morgue	2025	MGM+	co-production with Eleventh Hour Films and Sony Pictures Television
The Institute	2025–present	MGM+	co-production with Spyglass Media Group, Sashajo Productions and Nomadicfilm
Let the Devil In	2025	MGM+	

== MGM Alternative Television ==
Formerly known as Mark Burnett Productions, One Three Media, and United Artists Media Group. UAMG Content is still the company's legal name.

Title	Years	Network	Notes
Eco-Challenge	1995–2002	Discovery Channel	
Survivor	2000–present	CBS	co-production with CBS Studios, CBS Eye Productions, Castaway Television Productions and Survivor Productions LLC
The Apprentice	2004–2017	NBC	co-production with Trump Productions (seasons 1–14)
The Casino	2004	Fox	
The Apprentice UK	2005–present	BBC Two/BBC One	co-production with Naked
The Contender	2005–2009; 2018	NBC/ESPN/NBCSN; Epix	co-production with DreamWorks Television (seasons 1–4), Rogue Productions (season 1), ESPN Original Entertainment (seasons 1–4) and Paramount Television (season 5)
Rock Star	2005–2006	CBS	
The Martha Stewart Show	2005–2012	Syndication/Hallmark Channel	co-production with Martha Stewart Living Omnimedia distributed by NBCUniversal Television Distribution in North America and Fremantle International outside of North America
The Apprentice: You're Fired!	2006–present	BBC Three/BBC Two	co-production with Naked
Are You Smarter than a 5th Grader?	2007–2011; 2015; 2019	Fox; Syndication; Nickelodeon	co-production with Nickelodeon Productions, Hard Nocks South Productions and Zoo Productions
On the Lot	2007	Fox	co-production with DreamWorks Television and Amblin Television
Pirate Master	2007	CBS	
Amnesia	2008	NBC	
My Dad Is Better Than Your Dad	2008	NBC	
Bully Beatdown	2009–2012	MTV	
Toughest Cowboy	2009	Spike	
Expedition Africa	2009	History	
P. Diddy's Starmaker	2009	MTV	
How'd You Get So Rich?	2009–2010	TV Land	co-production with Zoo Productions
Shark Tank	2009–present	ABC	co-production with Sony Pictures Television
Sarah Palin's Alaska	2010	TLC	
The Voice	2011–present	NBC	co-production with Warner Horizon Unscripted Television and ITV America
Expedition Impossible	2011	ABC	
The Celebrity Apprentice Australia	2011–2021	Nine Network	co-production with Fremantle Australia (seasons 1–4) and Warner Bros. International Television Production (season 5)
Stars Earn Stripes	2012	NBC	co-production with Wolf Reality LLC and Bill's Market & Television Productions distributed by NBCUniversal Syndication Studios
Spin Off	2013–2016	Syndication	co-production with Suddenly SeeMore Productions
Trust Me, I'm a Game Show Host	2013	TBS	co-produced by Monkey Kingdom and Barracuda Television Productions
On the Menu	2014	TNT	
Lucha Underground	2014–2018	El Rey Network	co-production with Rodriguez International Pictures, FactoryMade Ventures and AG Studios Content
A.D. The Bible Continues	2015	NBC	co-production with Lightworkers Media
Beyond the Tank	2015–2016	ABC	co-production with Sony Pictures Television
500 Questions	2015–2016	ABC	co-production with Warner Horizon Television
Funny or Die Presents: America's Next Weatherman	2015	TBS	co-production with Funny or Die
America's Greatest Makers	2016	TBS	co-production with Intel
Coupled	2016	Fox	co-production with Grandma's House Entertainment
Beat Shazam	2017–present	Fox	co-production with Apploff Entertainment, Shazam and Biggerstage (2022–present)
Steve Harvey's Funderdome	2017	ABC	
TKO: Total Knock Out	2018	CBS	co-production with HartBeat Productions and Shaggy Entertainment
Unprotected Sets	2018–2022	Epix	co-production with Push It Productions
The World's Best	2019	CBS	co-production with Warner Horizon Television and Fulwell 73 Productions
Elvis Goes There	2019	Epix	miniseries; co-production with Wildline Entertainment and Zero Point Zero Production
Sex Life	2019–2022	Epix	co-production with Evolution Media
The Apprentice: ONE Championship Edition	2021–present	Netflix	co-production with ONE Studios and Refinery Media
The Big Shot with Bethenny	2021	HBO Max	co-production with Evolution Media and B Reality Productions
Generation Gap	2022–2023	ABC	co-production with Kimmelot and Milojo Productions for Greengrass Productions
Ring Nation	2022–2023	Syndication	co-production with Big Fish Entertainment and Ring
The Ruling Class	2023	MGM+	
Gladiators	2024–present	BBC One	under MGM Alternative UK; co-production with Hungry Bear Media
Squad Girls	TBA	TBA	co-production with Rh Negative

== United Artists Television ==
Title	Years	Network	Notes
World of Giants	1959	Syndication	Produced by Ziv Television Programs
Tales of the Vikings	1959–1960	Syndication	Produced by Kirk Douglas' production company Bryna Productions
The Troubleshooters	1959–1960	NBC	Produced by Meridian Proructions
The Dennis O'Keefe Show	1959–1960	CBS	Produced by Cypress Productions
Men into Space	1959–1960	CBS	Produced by Ziv Television Programs
The Aquanauts	1960–1961	CBS	Produced by Ziv Television Programs
Miami Undercover	1961	Syndication	Produced by Ziv Television Programs
Stoney Burke	1962–1963	ABC	Produced by Daystar Productions
The Outer Limits	1963–1965	ABC	Produced by Daystar Productions for Villa DiStefano Productions
The Fugitive	1963–1967	ABC	Overall rights to this show are currently owned by CBS Media Ventures, due to the buyout of its original syndicator and owner Worldvision
The Patty Duke Show	1963–1966	ABC	Produced by Chrislaw Productions (seasons 1 and 2) and Cottage Industries Incorporated (season 3)
East Side/West Side	1963–1964	CBS	Produced by Talent Associates in association with CBS
The New Phil Silvers Show	1963–1964	CBS	Produced by Gladasya Productions
Hollywood and the Stars	1963–1964	NBC	Produced by David L. Wolper
Lawbreakers	1963–1964	Syndication	Produced by Rapier Productions Incorporated
Gilligan's Island	1964–1967	CBS	co-production with Gladasya Productions; United Artists Television's stake in this show is currently owned by Turner Entertainment Co. and distributed by Warner Bros. Television Studios
My Mother the Car	1965–1966	NBC	Produced by Cottage Industries Incorporated
Mona McCluskey	1965–1966	NBC	Produced by McCadden Productions
O.K. Crackerby!	1965–1966	ABC	
The Milton Berle Show	1966–1967	ABC	
The Rat Patrol	1966–1968	ABC	Produced by Mirisch-Rich Television Productions and Tom Gries Productions
Hey, Landlord	1966–1967	NBC	Produced by Mirisch-Rich Television Productions
It's About Time	1966–1967	CBS	Produced by Gladasya Productions and Redwood Productions
The Super 6	1966–1967	NBC	Produced by DePatie-Freleng Enterprises and Mirisch-Rich Television Productions
Super President	1967–1968	NBC	Produced by DePatie-Freleng Enterprises and Mirisch-Rich Television Productions
The Mothers-in-Law	1967–1969	NBC	Produced by Desi Arnaz Productions
Ultraman	1968–1986	Syndication	Produced by Tsuburaya Productions
The Pink Panther Show	1969–1979	NBC/ABC	Produced by Mirisch Films and DePatie-Freleng Enterprises.

== Ziv Television Programs ==
- The Cisco Kid (1950–1956)
- Boston Blackie (1951–1953)
- The Unexpected (1952)
- Your Favorite Story (1953–1955)
- I Led Three Lives (1953–1956)
- Mr. District Attorney (1954–1955)
- Science Fiction Theatre (1955–1957)
- Highway Patrol (1955–1959)
- Dr. Christian (1956–1957)
- The Man Called X (1956–1957)
- West Point Story (1956–1957)
- Adventures at Scott Island (1957–1958)
- Harbor Command (1957–1958)
- Men of Annapolis (1957–1958)
- Target (1957–1958)
- Tombstone Territory (1957–1960)
- Dial 999 (1958–1959)
- Mackenzie's Raiders (1958–1959)
- The Rough Riders (1958–1959)
- Bat Masterson (1958–1961)
- Sea Hunt (1958–1961)
- Bold Venture (1959–1960)
- The Man and the Challenge (1959–1960)
- This Man Dawson (1959–1960)
- Lock-Up (1959–1961)
- Home Run Derby (1960) (co-production with Homer Productions)
- The Case of the Dangerous Robin (1960–1961)
- The Everglades (1961–1962)
- King of Diamonds (1961–1962)
- Ripcord (1961–1963)
- Keyhole (1962)

== The Cannon Group, Inc. ==
Title	Years	Network	Notes
D.C. Follies	1987–1989	Syndication	co-production with Sid & Marty Krofft Pictures and Negative Entertainment
Nightmare Classics	1989	Showtime	

== Orion Television ==
Title	Years	Network	Notes
Cagney & Lacey	1982–1988	CBS	continued from Filmways; co-production with Mace Neufeld Productions
Just Men!	1983	NBC	co-production with Century Towers Productions and Rosner Television
Lottery!	1983–1984	ABC	co-production with Rosner Television
20 Minute Workout	1983-1985	Syndication	co-production with Nelvana
Kay O'Brien	1986	CBS	co-production with Asher-Whitehead Productions
Hollywood Squares	1986–1989	Syndication	co-produced by Century Towers Productions
Adderly	1986–1988	Global/CBS	co-produced by Robert Cooper Productions and JayGee Productions
High Rollers	1987–1988	Syndication	co-produced by Century Towers Productions and syndicated by Orion Television Syndication
Crimewatch Tonight	1987–1990	Syndication	
RoboCop: The Animated Series	1988	Syndication	co-production with Marvel Productions based on the 1987 film by Orion Pictures; Currently distributed by Disney-ABC Home Entertainment and Television Distribution
Sunset Beat	1990	ABC	
Equal Justice	1990–1991	ABC	distribution only; produced by The Thomas Carter Company and ABC Productions
Glory Days	1990	Fox	
Lifestories	1990	NBC	co-production with Jeffrey Lewis Productions and Ohlmeyer Communications Company
Bill & Ted's Excellent Adventures	1990–1991	CBS/Fox Kids	co-production with Nelson Entertainment, Hanna-Barbera Productions (season 1) and DIC Entertainment (season 2) based on the 1989 film by Orion Pictures
WIOU	1990–1991	CBS	co-production with GTG Entertainment
Bill & Ted's Excellent Adventures	1992	Fox	co-production with Nelson Entertainment, Lorimar Television, & Innuendo Productions based on the franchise & the 1989 film by Orion Pictures currently distributed with Warner Bros. Television Distribution
RoboCop: The Series	1994	CTV; Syndication	produced by Rysher Entertainment, Skyvision Entertainment, and Rigel Entertainment
RoboCop: Alpha Commando	1998–1999	Syndication	co-production with Fireworks Entertainment and Metro-Goldwyn-Mayer Animation; Distributed by The Summit Media Group based on the 1987 film RoboCop by Orion Pictures
Lauren Lake's Paternity Court	2013–2020	Syndication	co-production with Georgia Film Office (2014–2020); (seasons 2–7), 79th & York Entertainment and Lauren Lake Limitless Entertainment (2018–2020); (seasons 6–7)
Couples Court	2017–2020	Syndication	
Personal Injury Court	2019–2020	Syndication	co-production with 501 East Entertainment

=== Filmways ===
Title	Years	Network	Notes
21 Beacon Street	1959	NBC	
Mister Ed	1961–66	Syndication/CBS	co-production with The Mister Ed Company
The Beverly Hillbillies	1962–71	CBS	Currently distributed by CBS Media Ventures
Petticoat Junction	1963–70	CBS	Currently distributed by CBS Media Ventures
The Addams Family	1964–66	ABC	
Green Acres	1965–71	CBS	
The Trials of O'Brien	1965–66	CBS	
Eye Guess	1966–69	NBC	co-production with Bob Stewart Productions
The Double Life of Henry Phyfe	1966	ABC	co-production with Luther Davis Productions
The Face Is Familiar	1966	CBS	co-production with Bob Stewart Productions
The Pruitts of Southampton	1966–67	ABC	
Personality	1967–69	NBC	co-production with Bob Stewart Productions
Dundee and the Culhane	1967	CBS	
The Debbie Reynolds Show	1969–70	NBC	
Bearcats!	1971	CBS	co-production with Rodlor Productions
Ozzie's Girls	1973–1974	Syndication	distributed by Viacom Enterprises
Mary Hartman, Mary Hartman	1976–77	Syndication	produced by T.A.T. Communications Company; currently owned by Sony Pictures Television
Big Hawaii	1977	NBC	
King	1978	NBC	
240-Robert	1979–81	ABC	co-production with Rosner Television
Thundarr the Barbarian	1980–81	ABC	co-production with Ruby-Spears; now currently owned by Warner Bros. Television Distribution

==== American International Television ====
Title	Years	Network	Notes
Sinbad Jr. and his Magic Belt	1965–1966	Syndication	co-production with Hanna-Barbera Productions
Prince Planet	1965–1966	Syndication	English version; produced by Television Corporation of Japan
Johnny Sokko and His Flying Robot	1967–1968	Syndication	English version; produced by Toei Company
Twiggy's Jukebox; Jukebox	1978–1980	Syndication	

==== Heatter-Quigley Productions ====
Title	Years	Network	Notes
Video Village	1960–1962	CBS	
Double Exposure	1961	CBS	
Video Village Junior	1961–1962	CBS	
People Will Talk	1963	NBC	
The Celebrity Game	1964	CBS	
Shenanigans	1964–1965	ABC	
PDQ	1965–1969	Syndication	syndicated by Four Star Television
Showdown	1966	NBC	
Hollywood Squares	1966–1981	NBC/Syndication	
Temptation	1967–1968	ABC	
Funny You Should Ask	1968–1969	ABC	
Wacky Races	1968–1969	CBS	co-production with Hanna-Barbera Productions; currently owned by Warner Bros. Television Distribution
Storybook Squares	1969; 1976–1977	NBC	
Lohman & Barkley's Name Droppers	1969	NBC	
Amateur's Guide to Love	1972	CBS	
Gambit	1972–1976	CBS	
Runaround	1972–1973	NBC	
Baffle	1973	NBC	
All-Star Baffle	1974	NBC	
High Rollers	1974–1976; 1978–1980	NBC/Syndication	
The Magnificent Marble Machine	1975–1976	NBC	
Hot Seat	1976	ABC	
To Say the Least	1977–1978	NBC	
Bedtime Stories	1979	Syndication	
Las Vegas Gambit	1980–1981	NBC	

=== Samuel Goldwyn Television ===
Title	Years	Network	Notes
Flipper	1964–67	NBC	distribution only
Body by Jake	1988–89	Syndication	
American Gladiators	1989–96	Syndication	co-production with Trans World International and Four Point Entertainment
GamePro TV	1990–91	Syndication	
Why Didn't I Think of That?	1992–94	Syndication	
Gladiators 2000	1994–96	Syndication	
Wild West Showdown	1994	Syndication	
Secrets of the Cryptkeeper's Haunted House	1996–97	CBS	co-production with Keller Productions, The Wohl Company and Tales from the Crypt Productions

== PolyGram Filmed Entertainment ==
Title	Years	Network	Notes
Teen Wolf	1986–1987	CBS	produced by Southern Star/Hanna-Barbera Australia, Clubhouse Pictures (season 1) and Atlantic/Kushner-Locke (season 2)

=== Fries Entertainment ===
Title	Years	Network	Notes
Baby, I'm Back	1978	CBS	co-production with Lila Garrett Productions and Dewil Productions
Born Famous	1987–1988	Syndication	co-production with Avanti Enterprises, Inc. and Mere-Mac Productions
Supercarrier	1988	ABC	co-production with Richard Maynard Productions and Real Tinsel Productions
The New Generation	1988	The Family Channel	co-production with Television House

== Evolution Media ==
Formerly known as Evolution Film & Tape. Evolution's programs are largely owned by other companies.

Title	Years	Network	Notes
Bug Juice	1998–2001	Disney Channel	co-production for Disney Channel
Screen Gems Network	1999–2002	Syndication	distributed by Columbia TriStar Television Distribution (later known as Columbia TriStar Domestic Television)
Fear Factor	2001	NBC	Season 1 only Distributed by Endemol
Totally Hoops	2001	Disney Channel	co-production with Disney Channel
Totally in Tune	2002	Disney Channel	co-production with Disney Channel
Switched!	2003–2004	ABC Family	co-production with ABC Family
Clean Sweep	2003–2005	TLC	co-production with Discovery Communications
Boy Meets Boy	2003	Bravo	co-production with Bravo Media Productions
House Rules	2003	TBS	
Bands Reunited	2004–2006	VH1	co-production for VH1
The Mansion	2004	TBS	co-production with Turner Entertainment Networks; Currently owned by MGM Television
He's a Lady	2004	TBS	co-production with Turner Entertainment Networks; Currently owned by MGM Television
10 Years Younger	2004–2008	TLC	co-production with Discovery Communications
That Yin Yang Thing	2005	TLC	co-production with Discovery Communications
The Adam Carolla Project	2005	TLC	co-production with Discovery Communications
The Real Housewives of Orange County	2006–present	Bravo	co-production with Bravo Media Productions and Dunloff Entertainment
Yo Momma	2006–2007	MTV	co-production with WV Productions and MTV Series Entertainment
Get Your Face On	2008	TLC	co-production with Discovery Communications
Growing Up Twisted	2010	A&E	
The Real Housewives of Beverly Hills	2010–present	Bravo	co-production with Bravo Media Productions
Beverly Hills Nannies	2012	ABC Family	co-production with ABC Family
Code: 9	2012	Disney Channel	co-production with Disney Channel
Prom Queens	2012	Lifetime	
Sin City Rules	2012–2013	TLC	co-production with Discovery Communications
Vanderpump Rules	2013–present	Bravo	co-production with Bravo Media Productions
Botched	2014–2024	E!	
Sweet Home Oklahoma	2017–2018	Bravo	co-production with Bravo Media Productions
Vanderpump Rules: Jax & Brittany Take Kentucky	2017	Bravo	co-production with Bravo Media Productions
Bug Juice: My Adventures at Camp	2018	Disney Channel	co-production with Disney Channel
The Hills: New Beginnings	2019–2021	MTV	co-production with MTV Entertainment Studios
Country Ever After	2020	Netflix	co-production with MGM Television and Lightworkers Media
Overserved with Lisa Vanderpump	2021	E!	
The Big Shot with Bethenny	2021	HBO Max	co-production with B Real Productions and MGM Television
Vanderpump Dogs	2021	Peacock	co-production with Bravo Media Productions
Siwa Dance Pop Revolution	2021	Peacock	co-production with Stinson Media and Team Siwa, Inc.
Welcome Home Nikki Glaser?	2022	E!	
Love in Fairhope	2023	Hulu	co-production with Hello Sunshine
The Valley	2024–present	Bravo	co-production with 32 Flavors Entertainment and Haymaker East
American Gladiators	TBA	Amazon Prime Video	co-production with Flor-Jon Films, Big Fish Entertainment and MGM Television
Business Hunters	TBA	CNBC	co-production with MGM Television
The Real Housewives of Rhode Island	TBA	Bravo	

== Big Fish Entertainment ==
Big Fish Entertainment's programs are largely owned by other companies.

Title	Years	Network	Notes
Love & Hip Hop: New York	2011–2020	VH1	co-production with Monami Productions and VH1
Bomb Patrol Afghanistan	2011–2012	G4	
Black Ink Crew	2013–2023	VH1	produced until 2020; continued and owned by MTV Entertainment Studios
Love & Hip Hop: Hollywood	2014–2019	VH1	co-production with Monami Productions and VH1
Black Ink Crew: Chicago	2015–2022	VH1	produced until 2020; continued and owned by MTV Entertainment Studios
Live PD	2016–2020	A&E	Distributed by Sony Pictures Television
Live PD: Police Patrol	2017–2020	A&E	Distributed in off-network syndication by Sony Pictures Television
Hustle and Soul	2017–2019	WeTV	
Tattoo Girls	2017	TLC	co-production with Discovery Communications
Chris Paul's Chapter 3	2017	ESPN	documentary miniseries
Live PD Presents: Women on Patrol	2018–2020	Lifetime	
Cartel Crew	2019–2021	VH1	co-production with MTV Entertainment Studios
Girls Cruise	2019	VH1	co-production with MTV Entertainment Studios
Black Ink Crew: Compton	2019–2023	VH1	season 1 only; continued and owned by MTV Entertainment Studios
Regular Heroes	2020	Amazon Prime Video	co-production with Roc Nation, Philymack and Amazon Studios
Amy Schumer Learns to Cook	2020	Food Network	co-production with So Easy Productions
Kitchen Crash	2021–2022	Food Network	
Ugliest House in America	2022–present	HGTV	
Secrets of the Chippendale Murders	2022	A&E	co-production with A+E Studios
Court Night Live	2022	A&E	
Ring Nation	2022–2023	Syndication	co-production with MGM Television and Ring
History's Greatest Heists	2023	History Channel	
Scariest House in America	2024	HGTV	
American Gladiators	TBA	Amazon Prime Video	co-production with Flor-Jon Films, Evolution Media and MGM Television

== NBC Studios (international distribution) ==
MGM Worldwide Television Distribution handles international distribution for the NBC Studios programs (produced between 1973 and 2004) listed below.

Title	Original run	Network	Notes
Go/Go-U.S.A.	1973–1976	NBC	
Little House on the Prairie	1974–1983	NBC	co-production with Ed Friendly Productions
Father Murphy	1981–1983	NBC	
Rage of Angels	1983	NBC	miniseries; co-production with Furia-Oringer Productions
Princess Daisy	1983	NBC	miniseries; co-production with Steve Krantz Productions
Fatal Vision	1984	NBC	miniseries
Hot Pursuit	1984	NBC	co-production with Kenneth Johnson Productions
Punky Brewster	1984–1988	NBC/Syndication	1984–1986 produced by NBC Productions; 1987–1988 produced by Columbia Pictures Television; Distributed by Sony Pictures Television in the U.S.
Sara	1985	NBC	co-production with Ubu Productions
It's Punky Brewster	1985–1986	NBC	co-produced by Ruby-Spears Enterprises. Based on the series Punky Brewster
Rage of Angels: The Story Continues	1986	NBC	miniseries; co-production with Furia-Oringer Productions
Kissyfur	1986–1990	NBC	co-production with DIC Entertainment and Saban International (season 2)
Mancuso, F.B.I.	1989–1990	NBC	co-production with Steve Sohmer Productions
True Blue	1989–1990	NBC	co-production with Grosso-Jacobson Productions
Generations	1989–1991	NBC	co-production with Old Forest Hill Productions
Saved by the Bell	1989–1993	NBC	co-production with Peter Engel Productions
Shannon's Deal	1990–1991	NBC	
Gravedale High	1990–1991	NBC	co-production with Hanna-Barbera Productions
A Family for Joe	1990	NBC	co-production with Grosso-Jacobson Productions
Guys Next Door	1990–1991	NBC	
Lucky Chances	1990	NBC	miniseries
Man of the People	1991–1992	NBC	co-production with Neal and Gary Productions
Here and Now	1992–1993	NBC	co-production with SAH Productions, Inc.
Secret Service	1992–1993	NBC	co-production with Grosso-Jacobson Productions and Skyvision Entertainment
Name Your Adventure	1992–1995	NBC	
California Dreams	1992–1997	NBC	co-production with Peter Engel Productions
Brains & Brawn	1993	NBC	
Running the Halls	1993	NBC	co-production with Steve Slavkin Productions
Saved by the Bell: The College Years	1993–1994	NBC	co-production with Peter Engel Productions
Saved by the Bell: The New Class	1993–2000	NBC	co-production with Peter Engel Productions
Message from Nam	1993	NBC	miniseries
The Martin Short Show	1994	NBC	co-production with Dolshor Productions
Family Album	1994	NBC	miniseries
Amazing Grace	1995	NBC	
Hang Time	1995–2000	NBC	co-production with Peter Engel Productions. Season 3 in the U.K. distributed by Sony Pictures Television instead
Profiler	1996–2000	NBC	co-production with Three Putt Productions (1998–2000, seasons 3-4) and Sander/Moses Productions
Mr. Rhodes	1996–1997	NBC	co-production with Universal Television
Doomsday Virus	1996	NBC	miniseries
The Tony Danza Show	1997	NBC	co-production with Katie Face Productions, Kokoro Productions and Columbia TriStar Television
Union Square	1997–1998	NBC	co-production with Barron/Pennette Productions and Three Sisters Entertainment
USA High	1997–1999	USA Network	co-production with Peter Engel Productions and Rysher Entertainment
Working	1997–1999	NBC	co-production with Davidoff/Rosenthal Productions
City Guys	1997–2001	NBC	co-production with Peter Engel Productions
Conrad Bloom	1998	NBC	co-production with Pennette Productions and Three Sisters Entertainment
One World	1998–2001	NBC	co-production with Peter Engel Productions
Will & Grace	1998–2006	NBC	co-production with KoMut Entertainment and Three Sisters Entertainment distributed by Warner Bros. Television in the U.S.
Passions	1999–2008	NBC/The 101 Network	MGM only distributes the first four seasons
Providence	1999–2002	NBC	co-production with John Masius Productions
DAG	2000–2001	NBC	co-production with Gordon & Conn Productions and Double Wide Productions
Just Deal	2000–2002	NBC	co-production with Lynch Entertainment and GEP Productions
All About Us	2001	NBC	co-production with Peter Engel Productions
The Fighting Fitzgeralds	2001	NBC	co-production with Artists Television Group, Irish Twins Productions and Mauretania Productions
Three Sisters	2001–2002	NBC	co-production with Blackie and Blondie Productions
Crossing Jordan	2001–2007	NBC	co-production with Tailwind Productions
Leap of Faith	2002	NBC	co-production with Perkins Street Productions
Boomtown	2002–2003	NBC	co-production with Nemo Films and DreamWorks Television
Watching Ellie	2002–2003	NBC	co-production with Hammond's Reef
Hidden Hills	2002–2003	NBC	co-production with Primarily Entertainment and Rude Mood Productions
American Dreams	2002–2005	NBC	co-production with Once a Frog, Dick Clark Productions and Universal Television
Hunter	2003	NBC	co-production with 20th Century Fox Television and Stu Segall Productions
Kingpin	2003	NBC	co-production with Knee Deep Productions and Spelling Television
Happy Family	2003–2004	NBC	co-production with Guarascio/Port Productions
Las Vegas	2003–2008	NBC	co-production with Gary Scott Thompson Productions and DreamWorks Television
LAX	2004–2005	NBC	co-production with The Mark Gordon Company and Nick Thiel Productions
Committed	2005	NBC	co-production with Blackie and Blondie Productions
Revelations	2005	NBC	co-production with Stillking Films and Pariah Television

== Television films & specials ==
=== MGM Television ===
Note: The pre-1986 television films are owned by Warner Bros. Television Studios through Turner Entertainment Co., while the post-1985 films are owned by MGM itself.

Title	Original run	Network	Notes
The Case of the Little Nellie	1965	CBS	
Meet Me in St. Louis	1966	ABC	
How the Grinch Stole Christmas!	1966	CBS	Co-production with The Cat in the Hat Productions, Dr. Seuss Productions and MGM Animation/Visual Arts
The Dangerous Days of Kiowa Jones	1966	ABC	Co-production with Youngstein & Karr Productions
The Scorpio Letters	1967	ABC	
The Rise and Fall of the Third Reich	1968	ABC	co-production with Wolper Productions
The Mask of Sheba	1970	NBC	
Horton Hears a Who!	1970	CBS	Co-production with The Cat in the Hat Productions, Dr. Seuss Productions and MGM Animation/Visual Arts
Earth II	1971	ABC	Co-production with Wabe
Miss Stewart, Sir	1972	CBS	
Assignment: Munich	1972	ABC	
The Fuzz Brothers	1973	ABC	
Shirts/Skins	1973	ABC	
The Phantom of Hollywood	1974	CBS	
Slither	1974	CBS	
Winter Kill	1974	ABC	Co-production with Andy Griffith Enterprises
Hello Mother, Goodbye	1974	NBC	
The Godchild	1974	ABC	Co-production with Alan Neuman Productions and Mor-Film Fare Productions
The Dream Makers	1975	NBC	
Last Hours Before Morning	1975	NBC	Co-production with Charles Fries Productions
They Only Come Out at Night	1975	NBC	
Nevada Smith	1975	NBC	Distribution only; Co-production with Rachin-Hayes Productions
The Deadly Tower	1975	NBC	
Babe	1975	CBS	Co-production with Norman Felton/Stanley Rubin Productions
High Risk	1976	ABC	Distribution only; Co-production with Danny Thomas Productions
Woman of the Year	1976	CBS	
The Hostage Heart	1977	CBS	co-production with Andrew J. Fenady Productions
The Girl in the Empty Grave	1977	NBC	Co-production with Mamteo Enterprises
Deadly Game	1977	NBC	Co-production with Manteo Enterprises
The Comedy Company	1978	CBS	Co-production with Malloy-Adler Productions
The Love Tapes	1980	ABC	Co-production with Christiana Productions
This House Possessed	1981	ABC	Co-production with Leonard Goldenberg Productions and Mandy Productions
Chicago Story	1981	NBC	Co-production with Epipsychidion Inc. and Eric Bercovici Productions
Death of a Centerfold: The Dorothy Stratten Story	1981	NBC	Co-production with Wilcox Productions
Incident at Crestridge	1981	CBS	Distribution only; Co-production with Jaffe/Taylor Productions
Paper Dolls	1982	ABC	Co-production with The Leonard Goldberg Company
Farrell for the People	1982	NBC	Co-production with InterMedia Entertainment Company and Tal Productions
Hear No Evil	1982	CBS	Co-production with Paul Pompian Productions
Cry for the Strangers	1982	CBS	Co-production with David Gerber Productions (owned by MGM)
I Was a Mail Order Bride	1982	CBS	Distribution only; Co-production with Tuxedo Ltd Productions
Cowboy	1983	CBS	Co-production with Bercovici-St. Johns Productions
Cocaine: One Man's Seduction	1983	NBC	Co-production with Charles Fries Productions (owned by MGM)
Legs	1983	ABC	Co-production with The Catalina Production Group
Women of San Quentin	1983	NBC	Co-production with David Gerber Productions (owned by MGM)
Summer	1984	CBS	Co-produced with Don Reid Productions
The Dirty Dozen: Next Mission	1985	NBC	
Braker	1985	ABC	Co-production with Blatt-Singer Productions and Centerpoint Productions
The Defiants Ones	1986	ABC	Co-production with Stormy Weather Production and Urich Productions; remake of 1958 film by United Artists
The Fifth Missile	1986	NBC	Co-production with Bercovici/St. Johns Productions and Cinecittà
George Washington II: The Forging of a Nation	1986	CBS	Co-produced with David Gerber Productions
Mercy or Murder?	1987	NBC	Co-production with John McMahon Productions
The Dirty Dozen: The Deadly Mission	1987	NBC	
Police Story: The Freeway Killings	1987	NBC	Co-production David Gerber Productions and Columbia Pictures Television
Happy Anniversary 007: 25 Years of James Bond	1987	ABC	
The Man Who Fell to Earth	1987	ABC	Co-produced with David Gerber Productions
If It's Tuesday, It Still Must Be Belgium	1987	NBC	
The King of Love	1987	ABC	Co-production with Sarabande Productions
Moving Target	1988	NBC	Co-production with Bateman Company Productions, Finnegan/Pinchuk Productions and Lewis B. Chesler Productions
The Dirty Dozen: The Fatal Mission	1988	NBC	Co-production with RAI Radiotelevisuone Italiana and Jadran Film
Broken Angel	1988	ABC	Co-production with The Stan Margulies Company
Hot Paint	1988	CBS	Co-production with Catalina Productions
Inherit the Wind	1988	NBC	Co-production with Vincent Pictures, Robert Papazian Productions and David Greene Productions
Red River	1988	CBS	Co-production with The Catalina Production Group; Remake of 1988 film
My Father, Mỹ Sơn	1988	CBS	Co-production with Fred Weintraub Productions and John McMahon Productions
The Tenth Man	1988	CBS	Co-production with CBS Entertainment Production and Hallmark Hall of Fame Productions
She Knows Too Much	1989	NBC	Co-produced with Finnegan/Pinchuk Productions and The Fred Silverman Company
Prime Target	1989	NBC	Co-production with Pipeline Productions, Finnegan/Pinchuk Productions and RLC Productions
Trenchcoat in Paradise	1989	CBS	Co-production with Ogiens / Kane Company and Finnegan/Pinchuk Productions
Johnny Ryan	1990	NBC	Co-production with Dan Curtis Productions and NBC Productions
Extreme Close-Up	1990	NBC	Co-production with Robert Greenwald Productions and The Bedford Falls Company
The Hit Man	1991	ABC	Co-production with Schenck/Cardea Productions
Finding the Way Home	1991	ABC	Co-production with Peter K. Duchow Productions
In the Arms of a Killer	1992	NBC	Co-produced with RLC Productions and Monarch Pictures Corporation
Those Secrets	1992	ABC	Co-production with Sarabande Productions
Lady Against the Odds	1992	NBC	Co-production with Robert Greenwald Productions
Fatal Memories	1992	NBC	Co-production with Green Point Productions and Western International Communications Ltd
Sketch Artist II: Hands That See	1995	Showtime	
Convict Cowboy	1995	Showtime	
Silver Strand	1995	Showtime	Co-production with VRP Production Services
How You Seen Mỹ Sơn	1996	ABC	Co-production with Gross-Weston Productions
The Limbic Region	1996	Showtime	Co-production with Pacific Motion Pictures
Escape Clause	1996	Showtime	
12 Angry Men	1997	Showtime	
The Taking of Pelham One Two Three	1998	ABC	Co-production with Trilogy Entertainment Group
Evidence of Blood	1998	Showtime	
The Spree	1998	Showtime	Co-production with Bona Fide Productions and Pacific Motion Pictures
The Escape	1998	Showtime	Co-production with Pacific Motion Pictures
The Patty Duke Show: Still Rockin' in Brooklyn Heights	1999	CBS	Co-production with Green/Epstein Productions
Inherit the Wind	1999	Showtime	
That Championship Season	1999	Showtime	
Body and Soul	1999	Showtime	Co-production with John Pike Productions
Dirty Pictures	2000	Showtime	Co-production with The Manheim Company
Hendrix	2000	Showtime	
Holiday Heart	2000	Showtime	Co-production with Tribeca Productions
Bojangles	2001	Showtime	Co-production with Darric Productions
Women vs. Men	2002	Showtime	Co-produced with The Bedford Falls Company
Carrie	2002	NBC	distribution; produced by Trilogy Entertainment Group
Legally Blonde	2003	ABC	
Fargo	2003	Trio	
Species III	2004	Sci-fi Channel	Co-Production with FGM Entertainment
Painkiller Jane	2005	Sci-fi Channel	Co-production with GEP Productions, Insight Film Studios and NBC Universal Television
Species: The Awakening	2007	Sci-fi Channel	Co-Production with 360 Pictures
The Initiation of Sarah	2006	ABC Family	
The Cutting Edge: Fire & Ice	2010	ABC Family	
Madso's War	2010	Spike TV	Co-production with Tom Lynch Company
A Very Pink Christmas	2011	ABC Family	co-production with RGH Entertainment, Christmas Panther and Mirisch-Geoffrey-DePatie-Freleng
Ice Girls	2016	Family Channel	co-production with RCI
People's Choice Awards	2016, 2017	CBS	

=== United Artists Television ===
- The Ghost of Sierra de Cobre (1964)
- The Incredible World of James Bond (1965) (co-production with Wolper Productions)
- Welcome to Japan, Mr. Bond (1967)
- Arsenic and Old Lace (1969)
- The Pink Panther in: A Pink Christmas (1978) (co-production with DePatie-Freleng Enterprises)
- The Pink Panther in: Olym-Pinks (1980) (co-production with DePatie-Freleng Enterprises)
- The Pink Panther in: Pink at First Sight (1981) (co-production with Marvel Productions and Mirisch-Geoffrey-Depatie-Freleng)
- Witness for the Prosecution (1982)
- I Take These Man (1983)
- I Want to Live (1983)
- James Bond: The First 25 Years (1983)

=== The Cannon Group, Inc. ===
- The Making of Death Wish 3 (1985)
- Gotham (1988)

=== Orion Television ===
- Forbidden Love (1982)
- The First Time (1982)
- Will There Really Be a Morning? (1983)
- Starflight: The Plane That Couldn't Land (1983)
- This Girl for Hire (1983)
- A Matter of Sex (1984)
- The Blood of Others (1984)
- Victims for Victims: The Theresa Saldana Story (1984)
- Condor (1985)
- Beverly Hills Madam (1986)
- Nazi Hunter: The Beate Klarsfeld Story (1986)
- Babes in Toyland (1986)
- Murder by the Book (1987)
- Return to Green Acres (1990)
- The Love She Sought (1990)

=== Filmways ===
- Moon of the Wolf (1972)
- Pioneer Woman (1973)
- The Stranger Who Looks Like Me (1974)
- Hustling (1975)
- My Father's House (1975)
- 21 Hours at Munich (1976)
- Smash-Up on Interstate 5 (1976)
- Danger in Paradise (1977)
- Mad Bull (1977)
- Flatbed Annie & Sweetiepie: Lady Truckers (1979)
- Anatomy of a Seduction (1979)
- Son-Rise: A Miracle of Love (1979)
- Portrait of a Stripper (1979)
- Disaster on the Coastliner (1979)
- Portrait of an Escort (1980)
- The Babysitter (1980)
- The Big Black Pill (1981)
- The Monkey Mission (1981)
- Miracle on Ice (1981)
- Return of the Rebels (1981)
- Lois Gibbs and the Love Canal (1982)
- In the Custody of Strangers (1982)
- Murder 1, Dancer 0 (1983)

=== American International Television ===
- The Wild Weird World of Dr. Goldfoot (1965)
- Attack of the Eye Creatures (1967)
- Zontar, The Thing from Venus (1967)
- Curse of the Swamp Creature (1968)
- Mars Needs Women (1968)
- In the Year 2889 (1969)
- Hell Raiders (1969)
- It's Alive (1969)
- Voyage Into Space (1970)
- An Evening of Edgar Allan Poe (1972)
- Cool and the Crazy (1994)

=== Fries Entertainment ===
- Strange Homecoming (1974)
- The Hatfields and the McCoys (1975)
- The Secret Night Caller (1975)
- Someone I Touched (1975)
- Hey, I'm Alive (1975)
- Foster and Laurie (1975)
- Louis Armstrong: Chicago Style (1976)
- Twin Detective (1976)
- The Call of the Wild (1976)
- The Million Dollar Rip-Off (1976)
- Francis Gary Powers: The True Story of the U-2 Spy Incident (1976)
- How to Break Up a Happy Divorce (1976)
- Stalk the Wild Child (1976)
- Night Drive (aka Night Terror) (1977)
- The Spell (1977)
- Terraces (1977)
- The Trial of Lee Harvey Oswald (1977)
- A Love Affair: The Eleanor and Lou Gehrig Story (1977)
- The Greatest Thing That Almost Happened (1977)
- Halloween with the New Addams Family (1977)
- Intimate Strangers (1977)
- Night Cries (1978)
- The Initiation of Sarah (1978)
- Are You in the House Alone? (1978)
- Human Feelings (1978)
- Crash (1978)
- The Winds of Kitty Hawk (1978)
- Spider-Man Strikes Back (1978)
- The House on Garibaldi Street (1979)
- Spider-Man The Dragon's Challenge (1979)
- The Two Worlds of Jennie Logan (1979)
- Bogie (1980)
- Rage! (1980)
- For the Love of It (1980)
- The Children of An Lac (1980)
- A Cry for Love (1980)
- High Noon, Part II: The Return of Will Kane (1980)
- Leave 'em Laughing (1981)
- Bitter Harvest (1981)
- Twirl (1981)
- The Ambush Murders (1982)
- In Love with an Older Woman (1982)
- Rosie: The Rosemary Clooney Story (1982)
- Cocaine: One Man's Seduction (1983)
- Dempsey (1983)
- Carpool (1983)
- Memorial Day (1983)
- Through Naked Eyes (1983)
- The Zany Adventures of Robin Hood (1984)
- Jealousy (1984)
- Calendar Girl Murders (1984) (produced by Tisch/Avnet Productions)
- The Burning Bed (1984) (produced by Tisch/Avnet Productions)
- Silence of the Heart (1984) (produced by Tisch/Avnet Productions)
- Sins of the Father (1985)
- Starcrossed (1985)
- Toughlove (1985)
- Poison Ivy (1985)
- Bridge Across Time (aka Terror at London Bridge) (1985)
- The Right of the People (1986)
- The Children of Times Square (1986)
- Samaritan: The Mitch Snyder Story (1986)
- Blood Vows: The Story of a Mafia Wife (1987)
- LBJ: The Early Years (1987)
- The Alamo: 13 Days to Glory (1987)
- Timestalkers (1987)
- Fight for Life (1987)
- Deep Dark Secrets (1987)
- Drop-Out Brother (1988)
- Crash Course (1988)
- Double Standard (1988)
- The Case of the Hillside Stranglers (1989)
- Bridge to Silence (1989)
- The Neon Empire (1989)
- Leona Helmsley: The Queen of Mean (1990)
- Absolute Strangers (1991)
- K-9000 (1991)
- Mission of the Shark: The Saga of the U.S.S. Indianapolis (1991)
- Chance of a Lifetime (1991)
- The Last P.O.W.? The Bobby Garwood Story (1993)

=== Trans World Entertainment ===
- Return to Earth (1976)
- How to Pick Up Girls! (1978)
- Summer of My German Soldier (1978; produced by Highgate Pictures)
- The Intruder Within (1981)
- Side Show (1981)
- Blood Ties (1986)

=== Heritage Entertainment Inc. ===
- Stagecoach (1986)

=== Samuel Goldwyn Television ===
- April Morning (1988)
- Dadah Is Death (1988)

=== Dino de Laurentiis Communications ===
- Sometimes They Come Back (1991)

=== Motion Picture Corporation of America (MPCA) ===
- Ring of the Musketeers (1992)
- Sketch Artist (1992)
- Love, Cheat & Steal (1993)

=== NBC Studios (international distribution) ===
- Mrs. R's Daughter (1979)
- The Last Ride of the Dalton Gang (1979)
- Wait till Your Mother Gets Home! (1983)
- An Early Frost (1985)
- C.A.T. Squad: Stalking Danger (1986)
- Christmas Eve (1986)
- The Abduction of Kari Swenson (1987)
- Assault and Matrimony (1987)
- The Little Match Girl (1987)
- The Child Saver (1988)
- C.A.T. Squad 2: Python Wolf (1988)
- A Father's Homecoming (1988)
- Winnie (1988)
- Flying Blind (1988)
- Take My Daughters, Please (1988)
- I'll Be Home for Christmas (1988)
- Brotherhood of the Rose (1989)
- Those She Left Behind (1989)
- The Gifted One (1989)
- Roe vs. Wade (1989)
- Turn Back the Clock (1989)
- Chameleons (1989)
- Fall from Grace (1990)
- Last Flight Out (1990)
- Kaleidoscope (1990)
- Fine Things (1990)
- Follow Your Heart (1990)
- Changes (1991)
- One Special Victory (1991)
- Danielle Steel's 'Palomino' (1991)
- Daddy (1991)
- In the Best Interest of the Children (1992)
- Secrets (1992)
- In the Shadow of a Killer (1992)
- Cruel Doubt (1992)
- Danger Island (1992)
- Saved by the Bell: Hawaiian Style (1992)
- Shadow of a Stranger (1992)
- Marked for Murder (1993)
- Heartbeat (1993)
- Danielle Steel's Star (1993)
- Double Deception (1993)
- The Secrets of Lake Success (1993)
- Bonanza: The Return (1993)
- Once in a Lifetime (1994)
- One Woman's Courage (1994)
- A Time to Heal (1994)
- Tonya and Nancy: The Inside Story (1994)
- Too Good to Be True (1994)
- A Perfect Stranger (1994)
- Saved by the Bell: Wedding in Las Vegas (1994)
- Roseanne and Tom: Behind the Scenes (1994)
- Bonanza: Under Attack (1995)
- Vanished (1995)
- Awake To Danger (1995)
- Fight for Justice: The Nancy Conn Story (1995)
- She Fought Alone (1995)
- Her Hidden Truth (1995)
- Mixed Blessings (1995)
- No Greater Love (1996)
- Remembrance (1996)
- Full Circle (1996)
- Night Visitors (1996)
- Seduced by Madness (1996)
- Her Last Chance (1996)
- Sweet Dreams (1996)
- The Secret She Carried (1996)
- Friends 'Til the End (1997)
- Asteroid (1997)
- Murder Live! (1997)
- Born Into Exile (1997)
- Killing Mr. Griffin (1997)
- Sleeping with the Devil (1997)
- The World's Wildest Magic (1997)
- Perfect Body (1997)
- Cloned (1997)
- The Tempest (1998)
- I've Been Waiting for You (1998)
- Witness to the Mob (1998)
- The World's Most Dangerous Magic (1998)
- Death Defying Thrills (1998)
- Crime and Punishment (1998)
- Payback (1999)
- The Wrong Girl (1999)
- Vanished Without a Trace (1999)
- The 60's (1999)
- Confirmation: The Hard Evidence of Aliens Among Us? (1999)
- Mutiny (1999)
- The World's Most Dangerous Magic 2 (1999)
- Dave Barlta: Extreme Stuntman (1999)
- Atomic Train (1999)
- The Jesse Ventura Story (1999)
- The Promise (1999)
- Cruel Justice (1999)
- Road Rage (1999)
- A Touch of Hope (1999)
- Countdown to Chaos (1999)
- The David Cassidy Story (2000)
- The Spring (2000)
- The 70's (2000)
- In His Life: The John Lennon Story (2000)
- Submerged (2001)
- Dying to Dance (2001)
- Hunter: Return to Justice (2002)
- It's a Very Merry Muppet Christmas Movie (2002)
- Hunter: Back in Force (2003)
- Critical Assembly (2003)
- Saving Jessica Lynch (2003)

== See also ==
- List of libraries owned by Amazon MGM Studios
- List of Amazon Prime Video original programming
  - List of ended Amazon Prime Video original programming
- Amazon MGM Studios
