= Lawbreaker =

A lawbreaker is someone that has committed a crime, also known as "breaking the law".

Lawbreaker or Lawbreakers may also refer to:

- The Lawbreakers, a 1961 American film directed by Joseph M. Newman
- Lawbreakers (TV series), an American crime documentary series that ran from 1963 to 1964
- Law Breakers, a 1971 French film directed by Marcel Carné
- LawBreakers, a video game by Boss Key Productions
