= Ziv Television Programs =

American television production company

- Type: Division
- Industry: Television
- Founded: 1948; 78 years ago
- Defunct: 1962; 64 years ago
- Fate: Acquired by United Artists Television
- Successors: Studio: United Artists Television; Library: Amazon MGM Studios; Skydance
- Parent: United Artists
- Subsidiaries: Economee TV

Ziv Television Programs, Inc., was an American production company that specialized in productions for first-run television syndication in the 1950s.

== History ==
The company was founded by Frederick Ziv in 1948 and was a subsidiary of his successful radio syndication business, which had begun in 1937. The company produced recorded programs and sold them directly to local television stations. The television syndication service proved lucrative during the late 1940s and early 1950s. Local television stations wanted to fill their schedules during hours outside of "prime time". By 1955, Ziv was producing more than 250 half-hour TV episodes a year.

For the process of creating shows for the network, Frederick Ziv stated that, "Our business is based on serving the stations that broadcast our programs and the advertisers that sponsor them, not just selling, but serving" and that "The number one way to do that, is to plan what will get the audience. Programs that do get audiences appeal to the basic emotions—love, conflict, adventure, mystery. These are things people want, things everyone's trying to give them. But just another anthology, just another cops-and-robbers story, isn't enough. The big problem is to give them in a new form, something off the beaten track". In searching for the best format for a new show, Frederick Ziv continued by stating, "Now comes the gigantic headache, We have our theme but how are we going to handle it? What kind of show can we make? Within the confines of good taste, which the stations demand, how can we come up with a series the public will love?"

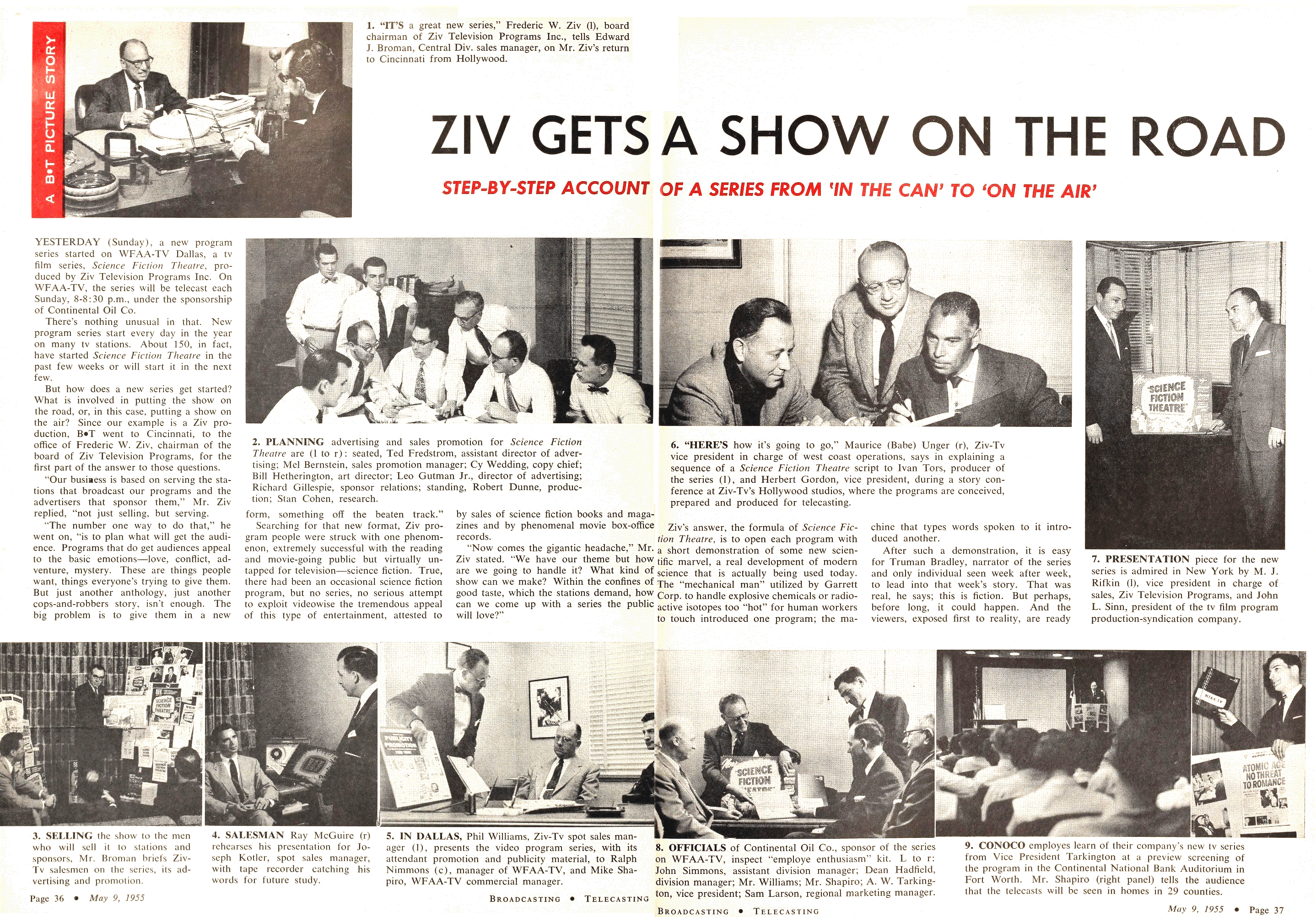
1955 company advertisement.

Ziv expanded beyond the United States, establishing four European subsidiaries in the fall of 1954. The company's first sale in Europe was Mr. District Attorney, bought by Radio Diffusion Francaise, with Ziv International of France overseeing dubbing of episodes into French. The trade publication Variety reported in February 1955 that Ziv's overall international budget had been increased to $2 million, which meant that its international activities "will operate at a loss for some time".

Needing more space to accommodate increasing production, in December 1954 Ziv purchased 92 percent of American National Studios in Hollywood. The trade publication Billboard said that the six-acre purchase was reported to have exceeded $2 million. It had more than double the space of Ziv's previous facility.

As the Big Three television networks began offering programs outside of prime time, Ziv's popularity and business began to decline. The market for first-run syndicated television programming began to dwindle, and the company, to attempt to save its business, began to produce programs which aired over the networks in 1956. In 1960, the company was purchased by United Artists and merged with their television unit to become Ziv-United Artists, but two years later, the name changed back to United Artists Television after the TV studio phased out Ziv Television Programs' operations. In 1962, shortly before the name change, Ziv-UA tried a hand in changing its focus on independent television producers.

Today, most of the rights to Ziv's TV shows are distributed by MGM Television and SFM Entertainment, while some of them have fallen into the public domain.

== Selected list of shows produced or distributed ==
- Acapulco ZIV-UA, 1961, starring Ralph Taeger & James Coburn (a brief reworking of Klondike)
- Bat Masterson ZIV-UA, 1958–1961, starring Gene Barry
- Bold Venture ZIV, 1959–1960, starring Dane Clark and Joan Marshall (adapted from Ziv's 1950–1952 radio program starring Humphrey Bogart and Lauren Bacall)
- Boston Blackie ZIV, 1951–1953, starring Kent Taylor (adapted from Ziv's earlier radio version)
- Dial 999 ZIV, 1958–1959, starring Robert Beatty (this was a co-production with Britain's ABC, not to be confused with the US ABC). Episodes and cast details can be viewed at ctva.biz/UK/dial999.htm
- Dr. Christian ZIV, 1956–1957, starring MacDonald Carey (a "sequel" to the original 1937–1954 radio series starring Jean Hersholt)
- Easy Aces, ZIV, 1949–1950, starring Goodman Ace and Jane Ace (adapted from their previous radio show)
- The Everglades ZIV-UA-Ivan Tors, 1961–1962, starring Ron Hayes
- Harbor Command ZIV, 1957–1958, starring Wendell Corey
- Harbormaster ZIV, 1957–1958, starring Barry Sullivan & Paul Burke
- Highway Patrol ZIV, 1955–1959, starring Broderick Crawford
- Home Run Derby ZIV, 1959–1960, hosted by Mark Scott
- I Led Three Lives ZIV, 1953–1956, starring Richard Carlson
- Keyhole ZIV-UA, 1962, Semi-documentary series.
- King of Diamonds ZIV-UA, 1961–1962, starring Broderick Crawford
- Klondike ZIV-UA, 1960–1961, starring Ralph Taeger & James Coburn
- Lee Marvin Presents Lawbreaker UATV, 1963–1964, Semi-documentary dramatizations of real cases hosted by Lee Marvin
- Lock-Up ZIV, 1959–1961, starring MacDonald Carey
- Mackenzie's Raiders ZIV, 1958–1959, starring Richard Carlson
- Malibu Run ZIV-United Artists-Ivan Tors starring Jeremy Slate & Ron Ely (reworking of The Aquanauts)
- The Man Called X ZIV, 1956–1957, starring Barry Sullivan (adapted from the radio series starring Herbert Marshall)
- Martin Kane, Private Investigator ZIV, 1957–1958, starring William Gargan (adapted from the original NBC radio and TV series)
- Meet Corliss Archer ZIV, 1954, starring Ann Baker (adapted from the original CBS radio and earlier TV show)
- Men into Space ZIV-Ivan Tors, 1959–1960, starring William Lundigan
- Men of Annapolis ZIV, 1957–1958, Naval anthology series
- Miami Undercover ZIV-UA, 1961, starring Lee Bowman (produced by Aubrey Schenck and Howard W. Koch)
- Mr. District Attorney ZIV, 1954–1955, starring David Brian (adapted from the original NBC radio and earlier ABC TV series)
- Paris Precinct 1955 starring Claude Dauphin & Louis Jourdan
- Ripcord ZIV-UA-Ivan Tors, 1961–1963, starring Larry Pennell & Ken Curtis
- Science Fiction Theatre ZIV-Ivan Tors, 1955–1957, anthology series hosted by Truman Bradley
- Sea Hunt ZIV-Ivan Tors, 1958–1961, starring Lloyd Bridges
- Target ZIV, 1957–1958, anthology series hosted by Adolphe Menjou
- The Aquanauts ZIV-UA-Ivan Tors, 1960–1961, starring Keith Larsen, Jeremy Slate, & Ron Ely
- The Case of the Dangerous Robin ZIV, 1960–1961, starring Rick Jason
- The Cisco Kid ZIV, 1950–1956, starring Duncan Renaldo & Leo Carrillo (adapted from Ziv's original radio edition)
- The Eddie Cantor Comedy Theatre ZIV, 1955, starring Eddie Cantor
- The Man and the Challenge ZIV, 1959–1960, starring George Nader
- The Rough Riders ZIV, 1958–1959, starring Kent Taylor
- The Unexpected ZIV, 1952, Suspense anthology hosted by Herbert Marshall
- This Man Dawson ZIV, 1959–1960, starring Keith Andes
- Tombstone Territory ZIV, 1957–1960, starring Pat Conway & Richard Eastham
- The Troubleshooters ZIV, 1959–1960, starring Keenan Wynn
- Waterfront ZIV, 1954–1955, starring Preston Foster (co-produced by Roland Reed)
- West Point Story ZIV, 1956–1957, Military anthology series.
- World of Giants (a.k.a. W-O-G) ZIV, 1959 (13 episodes), starring Marshall Thompson
- Your Favorite Story ZIV, 1953–1954, anthology series hosted by Adolphe Menjou (adapted from Ziv's 1946–1949 radio series, Favorite Story, hosted by Ronald Colman)
