= King of Diamonds (TV series) =

1960s American TV series

- Genre: Crime drama
- Directed by: Eddie Davis; Maurice Unger; Robert Gordon; John Rich; James Goldstone; Skip Homeier; William Conrad; Irving Lerner; Richard L. Bare
- Starring: Broderick Crawford
- Composer: Warren Barker
- Country of origin: United States
- Original language: English
- No. of seasons: 1
- No. of episodes: 38

Production
- Executive producers: Maurice Unger; Jon Epstein
- Producers: John Robinson; Broderick Crawford
- Cinematography: Curt Fetters; Monroe P. Askins; Richard L. Rawlings
- Camera setup: Single-camera
- Running time: 30 minutes (including commercials)
- Production companies: Ziv Television Programs; United Artists Television

Original release
- Network: First-run syndication
- Release: September 13, 1961 – May 22, 1962

King of Diamonds is an American syndicated crime drama TV series starring Broderick Crawford that ran for 39 episodes from 1961 to 1962. It was made by Ziv-United Artists, for whom Crawford had made Highway Patrol.

== Plot ==
Broderick Crawford stars as John King, the diamond industry's head of security, who travelled the world fighting unsavory gem smugglers, thieves and fences. King's colleague in detection is Al Casey played by Ray Hamilton. Episodes were 30 minutes long.

Guest stars included Lola Albright.

== Production ==
John Rich was the producer and director. The series premiered in 118 markets.
