= The Case of the Dangerous Robin =

- Genre: Crime drama
- Created by: Leo Gordon; John Abernathy
- Starring: Rick Jason
- Theme music composer: David Rose
- Composer: David Rose
- Country of origin: United States
- Original language: English
- No. of seasons: 1
- No. of episodes: 38

Production
- Producer: Frederick Ziv
- Production location: Los Angeles, California
- Camera setup: Single-camera
- Running time: 30 mins.
- Production company: Ziv-United Artists

Original release
- Network: Syndication
- Release: October 18, 1960 – July 1, 1961

The Case of the Dangerous Robin is an American crime drama series that aired in syndication from October 1960 to July 1961. The series, which starred Rick Jason, was produced by Ziv Television Productions.

== Overview ==
The series follows an insurance investigator, Robin Scott (Jason), who worked big cases for a ten percent finder's fee. The series also features Jean Blake Fleming as Phyllis Collier. The half-hour black-and-white episodes ran in syndication from 1960 to 1961.

The series was the first to feature karate with Ed Parker as a technical adviser. According to actor Rick Jason in his autobiography Scrapbooks of My Mind, "I said I would do the show if I could use Karate, not carry a gun. 'The man,' I proposed, 'will be his own moving weapon.'"

The show was often tongue-in-cheek, showing Rick Scott as a ladies' man who spent as much time looking for women as for retrieving the stolen goods.

== Cancellation ==
The series was cancelled after one season due to the illness of star Rick Jason. He was in traction after the first season to treat his sciatica. The following year Rick Jason was hired for his most memorable role as 2nd Lieutenant Gil Hanley in the ABC WWII-based series Combat!, which was produced from 1962 to 1967.
