= George Christy (columnist) =

American columnist (1927–2020)

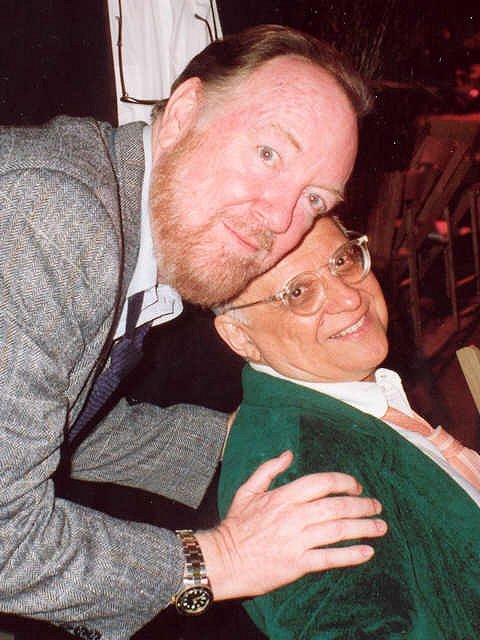
- George Christy (seated) with Jack Haley Jr. at the Air America premiere in 1990
- Born: May 14, 1927
- Died: August 11, 2020 (aged 93); Santa Monica, California
- Occupation: Columnist

George Christy (May 14, 1927 – August 11, 2020) was an American columnist who wrote for The Hollywood Reporter for 26 years and later for The Beverly Hills Courier.

== Career ==
Christy was suspended from The Hollywood Reporter in May 2001 amid Screen Actors Guild accusations and investigatation that he improperly received health benefits for performing in films in which he did not actually appear. He also was accused of accepting lavish gifts and free office space from those he wrote about favorably in his column, “The Great Life.” He resigned six months later.
