= The Incredible World of James Bond =

- Original television advertisement designed prior to Sean Connery quitting the project
- Written by: Jack Haley Jr. & Al Ramrus
- Directed by: Jack Haley Jr.
- Narrated by: Alexander Scourby
- Country of origin: United States

Production
- Producer: David L. Wolper
- Running time: 51 min.
- Production company: Wolper Productions

Original release
- Network: NBC
- Release: November 26, 1965

The Incredible World of James Bond is a 1965 American television special produced by David L. Wolper for United Artists Television to showcase the James Bond film series and promote the upcoming December 1965 release of the film Thunderball.

In the United States, the show replaced The Man from U.N.C.L.E. on NBC on Friday, November 26, 1965; the day after American Thanksgiving that unofficially begins the shopping frenzy for Christmas. It was the highest rated American television show for the week.

== Plot and production ==
The Incredible World of James Bond featured film scenes of the worldwide popularity of James Bond novels, films, and tie-in merchandise, black and white scenes of Ian Fleming at his home Goldeneye in Oracabessa, Jamaica giving comments on his writing, a biography of James Bond with footage of Glencoe, Eton, Fettes College, and Royal Marine Commandos on exercise, home movie footage shot by production designer Ken Adam in the Bahamas during the production of Thunderball, and scenes from four Bond films.

Behind the scenes footage from the making of Thunderball included scenes of the preparation and filming of a scene of a rocket firing motorcycle destroying Count Lippe (Guy Doleman)'s car, a choreographed fist fight in a studio mock up of the cabin of the Disco Volante, a photo shoot of the Bond girls on a beach in the Bahamas, and a scene of the Aston Martin DB5 driving away from the Château d'Anet that was not seen in the finished film.

Director Terence Young, producers Albert R. Broccoli, Harry Saltzman, Kevin McClory, editor Peter R. Hunt and action director and stuntman Bob Simmons are shown during sequences. The "James Bond Theme" and other music from the Bond film soundtracks are heard with the gun barrel titles and 007 logo from the Goldfinger film trailer appearing in the opening titles.

The narration was to have been originally given by Sean Connery. However, when Connery read the script and found out they were referring to James Bond as an actual person he refused to do the show. Telephone calls from Joan Crawford who was a major shareholder in Pepsi Cola, the sponsor of the show, failed to sway Connery and his narrating chores were taken by Alexander Scourby.

Pepsi Cola used the special to unveil commercials for its latest products.

The special is available as a featurette on the "James Bond Ultimate Edition" DVD of Thunderball.

== Record album ==
Pepsi Cola and Frito Lay also sold promotional James Bond tie-in toys and a record album titled The Incredible World of James Bond. The album featured the original soundtrack music and cover versions of four of the themes from the first three Bond films Dr. No, From Russia with Love and Goldfinger played by United Artists Records house band The Leroy Holmes Orchestra. The back of the album cover was full of photographic stills from the Bond films. The record was later reissued with an attractive Frank Gauna designed album cover on Unart Records in 1967 with two music tracks deleted to fit on the budget album.

== See also ==
- Outline of James Bond
