= United Artists Television =

American television production/distribution studio

- Type: Division
- Industry: Television
- Predecessors: Ziv Television Programs; United Artists Associated
- Founded: January 1, 1958; 68 years ago
- Defunct: 1995; 31 years ago
- Fate: Folded into MGM/UA Entertainment Co. Television
- Successors: Studio: MGM/UA Entertainment Co. Television; Library: Skydance Corporation (through Spelling Television and Turner Entertainment Co.) (The Fugitive, Gilligan's Island, The New Adventures of Gilligan and Gilligan's Planet only)
- Parent: United Artists
- Subsidiaries: United Artists Associated (1958–1968); Ziv Television Programs (1960–1962)

United Artists Television (UATV) was an American television production/distribution studio of United Artists Corporation that was formed on January 1, 1958. The company is remembered for producing series such as This Man Dawson, World of Giants, Stoney Burke, The Outer Limits, Gilligan's Island, My Mother the Car, The Fugitive, The Rat Patrol, thirtysomething, The New Phil Silvers Show, The Patty Duke Show and The Pink Panther Show. In September 2014, the studio briefly returned to full-time television production under the new management of United Artists Media Group (UAMG), led in part by husband and wife producers Mark Burnett and Roma Downey. With its folding back into MGM Television, UATV was temporarily dormant until 2020 when MGM Television was reincorporated.

== History ==
UATV was formed on January 1, 1958, with Herb Golden, former vice-president of Banker's Trust, as its president, and Bruce Eells from Television Programs of America as its top operating executive.

In that same year, UATV purchased Associated Artists Productions (a.a.p.), giving access to the pre-1950 Warner Bros.' short subject library and the 231 Popeye cartoon shorts made by Fleischer Studios and Famous Studios for Paramount Pictures between 1933 and 1957. With UATV's purchase, a.a.p. became United Artists Associated (u.a.a.) and became its distribution division.

In 1960, UATV purchased Ziv Television Programs, including the 20% share still held by board chairman Frederick Ziv and his son-in-law and business partner president John L. Sinn, for $20 million. The newly merged production company was renamed Ziv-United Artists.

UATV had never been very successful in the small screen, having placed only two series in prime time, The Troubleshooters on NBC and The Dennis O'Keefe Show on CBS, both of the 1959–1960 season. This negative pattern continued after the merger. Ziv-UA produced a dozen of TV pilots during the first year of operation, but failed to sell any of them, although Aubrey Schenck's Miami Undercover only lasted one season in 1961.

After an experiment that tried in 1961 with the signing of outside producers like Chrislaw Productions, David Wolper Productions and Jack Douglas, in 1962, the studio stopped filming its own shows and went to independent producers under creative control, and later on, on September 1, 1962, phased out Ziv Television Programs and reverted its name to United Artists Television. In that same year, ABC premiered a successful prime time television film show called The ABC Sunday Night Movie in competition to NBC's successful motion picture program Saturday Night at the Movies. The first season featured releases of many United Artists' films with some episodes containing featurettes promoting the upcoming UA's cinema releases.

UATV had several shows such as Stoney Burke (1962), The Patty Duke Show (1963), The Outer Limits (1963), The Fugitive (1963), Hollywood and the Stars (1963), The Hollywood Palace (1964), and Gilligan's Island (1964). In 1965, he attempted a deal with Aaron Spelling Productions to produce movies and TV shows, but the deal never materialized. In 1967, UATV was purchased by Transamerica Corporation and, the following year, United Artists Associated was reincorporated as United Artists Television Distribution (UATD). After The Mothers-in-Law was cancelled on NBC in 1969, the studio decided to focus in presenting their movie library on television and rerunning their classics after years of still being unsuccessful in TV production. The company tried to return to television production in late 1978 when United Artists licensed its film library to television producer Lorimar Productions for adaptation to television series and miniseries, but it never materialized. The company reentered television production in 1981 when Richard S. Reisberg, formerly of Viacom Productions, joined the company to set up a new production division.

In 1981, MGM merged with UA to create MGM/UA Entertainment Co.; as a result, their respective television units combined as well became MGM/UA Entertainment Co. Television or simply MGM/UA Television the following year. The United Artists Television name was eventually phased out around 1983 in favor of the MGM/UA Television banner, although UATV continued itself producing television shows until 1995. In 1985, United Artists Television was returned after Turner bought out MGM, to be headed by John J. McMahon, only to be combined into MGM/UA Television Productions within a year, when Turner sold off MGM/UA.

=== Return to television ===
In September 2014, MGM acquired a 55% controlling interest in One Three Media and Lightworkers Media, both operated by husband/wife Hollywood producers Mark Burnett and Roma Downey (Touched by an Angel fame). The two companies were consolidated into a new film and television company, United Artists Media Group (UAMG). Burnett is UAMG's CEO and Downey is president of Lightworkers Media Hearst Entertainment, an investor in Burnett and Downey's entertainment assets, has also acquired a minority stake in United Artists through this deal. Through this acquisition, UAMG held the production rights to Burnett's reality show franchises The Voice, Survivor, The Apprentice, On the Menu, Shark Tank, Beyond the Tank and Lucha Underground. When it was folded back into MGM Television, UATV's current incarnation ended. Although since then, MGM/UA Television was reformed (as of February 2020), most new UATV material is produced either by MGM's digital unit or MGM itself.

== Filmography ==
=== Television series ===
==== United Artists Television (UATV) ====
Title	Years	Network	Notes
World of Giants	1959	Syndication	Produced by Ziv Television Programs.
Tales of the Vikings	1959–1960	Syndication	Produced by Kirk Douglas' production company Brynaprod in Germany.
The Troubleshooters	1959–1960	NBC	Produced by Meridian Productions.
The Dennis O'Keefe Show	1959–1960	CBS	Produced by Cypress Productions.
Men into Space	1959–1960	CBS	Produced by Ziv Television Programs.
The Aquanauts	1960–1961	CBS	Produced by Ziv Television Programs.
Miami Undercover	1961	Syndication	Produced by Ziv Television Programs.
Stoney Burke	1962–1963	ABC	Produced by Daystar Productions.
The Outer Limits	1963–1965	ABC	Produced by Villa DiStefano for Daystar Productions.
The Fugitive	1963–1967	ABC	Produced by Quinn Martin Productions; Overall rights to this show now is owned by CBS Studios and distributed by CBS Media Ventures, due to the buyout of its original syndicator and owner, Worldvision.
The Patty Duke Show	1963–1966	ABC	Produced by Chrislaw Productions between 1963 and 1965 and by Cottage Industries Incorporated during the third and last season (1965–1966).
East Side/West Side	1963–1964	CBS	Produced by Talent Associates in association with CBS.
The New Phil Silvers Show	1963–1964	CBS	Produced by Gladasya Productions.
Hollywood and the Stars	1963–1964	NBC	Produced by David L. Wolper.
Lawbreakers	1963–1964	Syndication	Produced by Rapier Productions Incorporated.
Gilligan's Island	1964–1967	CBS	United Artists Television's stake in this show now is owned by Turner Entertainment Co. and distributed by Warner Bros. Television, in co-production with Gladasya Productions.
My Mother the Car	1965–1966	NBC	Produced by Cottage Industries Incorporated.
Mona McCluskey	1965–1966	NBC	Produced by McCadden Productions.
O.K., Crackerby!	1965–1966	ABC	
The Milton Berle Show	1966–1967	ABC	
The Rat Patrol	1966–1968	ABC	Produced by Mirisch-Rich Television Productions and Tom Gries Productions.
Hey, Landlord	1966–1967	NBC	Produced by Mirisch-Rich Television Productions.
It's About Time	1966–1967	CBS	Produced by Gladasya Productions and Redwood Productions.
Super 6	1966	NBC	Produced by DePatie–Freleng Enterprises and Mirisch-Rich Television Productions
The Mothers-In-Law	1967–1969	NBC	Produced by Desi Arnaz Productions.
Super President	1967	NBC	Produced by DePatie–Freleng Enterprises and Mirisch-Rich Television Productions
Ultraman	1968–1991	Syndication	Produced by Tsuburaya Productions.
The Pink Panther Show	1969–1979	NBC/ABC	Produced by Mirisch Films and DePatie–Freleng Enterprises.

==== United Artists Media Group (UAMG) ====
Title	Years	Network	Notes
Survivor	2000–present	CBS	
The Apprentice	2004–2017	NBC	
Shark Tank	2009–present	ABC	co-production with Sony Pictures Television.
The Voice	2011–present	NBC	co-production with Warner Horizon Television.
On the Menu	2014	TNT	
Lucha Underground	2014–2018	El Rey Network	
Beyond the Tank	2015–2016	ABC	co-production with Sony Pictures Television.

=== Television specials ===
- The Incredible World of James Bond (1965, television special)
- Welcome to Japan, Mr. Bond (1967, television special)
- The Pink Panther in: A Pink Christmas (1978, television special)
- James Bond: The First 25 Years (1983, television special)
