= Mona McCluskey =

- Also known as: Meet Mona McCluskey
- Genre: Sitcom
- Created by: Don McGuire Based on characters originated by Sumner Arthur Long
- Written by: Arthur Alsberg; Edmund Beloin; Irving Elinson; Bob Fisher; Fred S. Fox; Henry Garson
- Directed by: Richard Whorf; Stanley Z. Cherry
- Starring: Juliet Prowse; Denny Scott Miller
- Country of origin: United States
- Original language: English
- No. of seasons: 1
- No. of episodes: 26

Production
- Executive producer: George Burns
- Camera setup: Multi-camera
- Running time: 22–24 minutes
- Production companies: McCadden Productions; United Artists Television

Original release
- Network: NBC
- Release: September 16, 1965 – April 14, 1966

Mona McCluskey (also known as Meet Mona McCluskey) is an American sitcom that aired on NBC as part of its 1965-66 schedule. The series stars Juliet Prowse in the title role, and aired from September 16, 1965 to April 14, 1966.

== Synopsis ==
Prowse portrayed Mona McCluskey, an actress who marries a United States Air Force sergeant, Mike McCluskey, played by Denny Scott Miller. The major premise of the show is Mona trying to balance her acting career with her marriage to Mike, who preferred that they live on his smaller Air Force salary.

The series also co-stars Herbert Rudley as General Crone, Mike's boss and Robert Strauss as Sergeant Gruzewsky. Series guest stars include Med Flory, Maurice Marsac, Lee Bergere, Sal Mineo, Barry Kelley, Doris Singleton, and Darlene Patterson.

== Episodes ==
No.	Title	Directed by	Written by	Original release date
1	"Pilot"	Don McGuire	Don McGuire	September 16, 1965
Mona sets off a chain reaction when she demands the Air Force give her husband a raise.
2	"All That Dough and No Place to Go"	Richard Whorf	Fred S. Fox & Irving Elinson	September 23, 1965
Mona and General Crone conspire for Mike to win at poker so he has enough money for a Mexican vacation.
3	"All in a Night's Work"	Richard Whorf	Bob Fisher & Arthur Alsburg	September 30, 1965
Mona's movie is behind schedule, but in order to keep the picture from going over budget, her director says she'll have to work nights - something Mona promised Mike she'd never do.
4	"In Every Life a Little Wife Must Fall"	Richard Whorf	Fred S. Fox & Irving Elinson	October 7, 1965
At the request of the State Department, a reluctant Mona agrees to dine with a visiting maharajah, who has a reputation as a playboy, something Mike isn't too keen about.
5	"Mona Carroll Vs. Mona McCluskey"	Richard Whorf	Arthur Alsberg & Bob Fisher	October 14, 1965
When Mike is recommended for officers' training school, Mona decides to abandon her acting career.
6	"How to Put Out an Old Flame"	Richard Whorf	Fred S. Fox & Irving Elinson	October 21, 1965
Mona is pleased when Mike leaves to attend a reunion of his old squadron, but becomes suspicious when she sees him instead in a restaurant with a beautiful girl (Lisa Gaye).
7	"Let's Play Cupid"	Richard Whorf	Fred S. Fox & Irving Elinson	October 28, 1965
Mona and Mike undertake the considerable challenge of making a suave charmer of Sgt. Gruzewsky – whose girlfriend thinks he "ain't got no class".
8	"Good for the Goose, Bad for the Gander"	Richard Whorf	Fred S. Fox & Irving Elinson	November 4, 1965
Mike is annoyed when Mona's costar – a handsome Italian actor – begins spending more and more time with her.
9	"Michelangelo's Rival"	Richard Whorf	Fred S. Fox & Irving Elinson	November 11, 1965
Mona buys a $1500 work of art and – in order to prevent him from learning what she spent – tells Mike she sculpted it.
10	"How to Cure an Old Man"	Richard Whorf	Fred S. Fox & Irving Elinson	November 25, 1965
Mona tries to help a down-on-his-luck film star (Patric Knowles) – who intends to become a permanent house guest.
11	"My Husband, The Wife Beater"	Richard Whorf	Fred S. Fox & Irving Elinson	December 2, 1965
Mona's visiting spinster aunts (Madge Blake, Dorothy Neumann), expecting to find their movie-star niece living in a luxurious mansion, find themselves unimpressed by Mike and their unglamorous lifestyle.
12	"Mail Against Female"	Richard Whorf	Fred S. Fox & Irving Elinson	December 9, 1965
Mona fails in her promise never to open Mike's mail, so he decides to cure her of her habit once and for all.
13	"Stranger in the Love Nest"	Richard Whorf	Arthur Alsberg & Bob Fisher	December 23, 1965
Mona's reaction is negative when a unsavory photographer invades her home.
14	"Dance, Kookerina, Dance"	Richard Whorf	Fred S. Fox & Irving Elinson	December 30, 1965
When Mona, who is secretly being given an award at the Air Force Frolics, is informed someone else will be dancing there in her place, she refuses to attend the show.
15	"Mona, the Soft Air Force Recruit"	Richard Whorf	Fred S. Fox & Irving Elinson	January 13, 1966
Mike, who's broke, refuses to let Mona buy a color TV set, so Mona plants a coin worth hundreds of dollars in his pocket, only to later discover the coin's real worth.
16	"Down from the Wild Blue Yonder"	Richard Whorf	Fred S. Fox & Irving Elinson	January 20, 1966
Mike considers leaving the Air Force for a high-paying civilian job, and Mona doesn't want him to, to the point of sabotaging every new career he tries.
17	"The General Swings at Dawn"	Richard Whorf	Fred S. Fox & Irving Elinson	January 27, 1966
Mona tries to persuade General Crone's visiting nephew (Sal Mineo) to give up being a beatnik – by becoming one herself.
18	"Lovebirds and Jailbirds"	Richard Whorf	Fred S. Fox & Irving Elinson	February 10, 1966
Incensed by an insult comic's references to Mona's earning power, Mike hits the man with a pie.
19	"Diamonds Are a Girl's Worst Friend"	Richard Whorf	Henry Garson and Edmund Beloin	February 17, 1966
Mike gives Mona a diamond ring – which Mona promptly loses.
20	"Mona, the Mystic"	Stanley Z. Cherry	Fred S. Fox	February 24, 1966
Sgt. Gruzewsky postpones his marriage to his fiancée after seeing a fortune teller, but Mona resorts to her own crystal ball to reschedule the ceremony.
21	"Love, Chimp Style"	Richard Whorf	Fred S. Fox & Irving Elinson	March 3, 1966
Mona's new picture is completed, but her co-star – a chimpanzee – is unwilling to call it quits.
22	""Operation - Chicken Soup""	Stanley Z. Cherry	William Raynor and Myles Wilder	March 10, 1966
Mona is worried about Mike's cold, so perhaps it's just as well that he didn't tell her that he'll soon be heading out on a rugged Air Force survival test.
23	"How to Turn Off a Laser Beam"	Richard Whorf	Fred S. Fox	March 17, 1966
An alleged Texas millionaire offers Mona a chance to invest in a new electronics company, over Mike's suspicions that he's a fraud.
24	"Snow Valley Snow Job"	Richard Whorf	Henry Garson and Edmund Beloin	March 24, 1966
After recalling her skill on skis in the movies, Mike enters Mona in a women's downhill ski race...but Mike doesn't know that Mona's stunt double actually did the filmed ski scenes.
25	"Will He, or Won't He?"	Richard Whorf	Norman Paul, Elon Packard, and William Burns	April 7, 1966
Mona and Mike work overtime to try and convince Sgt. Gruzewsky to finally marry his fiancée.
26	"Mike's Birthday Present"	Richard Whorf	Fred S. Fox	April 14, 1966
Against his wishes, Mona has a surprise present lined up for Mike's birthday, but is that present a baby?

== Production notes ==
The series was produced for NBC by McCadden Enterprises, Inc. in association with United Artists Television. The series executive producer was comedian George Burns. The theme song was the Tin Pan Alley standard "Yes Sir, That's My Baby", sung by a male voice.

== Reception ==
Mona McCluskey appeared on Thursday nights against ABC's Peyton Place and the second half-hour of CBS's two-hour Thursday Night Movie. It failed to win its time slot and was cancelled by NBC, with its last episode airing in April 1966.
