= The Unexpected (TV series) =

American television series

The Unexpected, aka Time Square Playhouse, is a 30-minute US television anthology series produced by Ziv Television Programs, Inc., for first-run syndication. Thirty-nine episodes aired from March 5, 1952 to December 10, 1952.

== Casts ==
Herbert Marshall hosted the series. Guest stars included Craig Stevens, Raymond Burr, Gale Storm, Bonita Granville, Marie Windsor, Kenneth Tobey, Marshall Thompson, Hans Conried, Tom Drake, Virginia Grey, Jim Davis (actor), and Coleen Gray.

Robert E. Lee and Jerome Lawrence were writers for the series.

== Episodes ==
| No. | Title | Directed by | Written by | Original release date |
|---|---|---|---|---|
| 1 | "Calculated Risk" | Eddie Davis | Jerome Lawrence and Robert E. Lee | March 5, 1952 |
A debt-ridden man considering suicide is offered a way out of his woes.
| 2 | "The Hitchhiker Was A Lady" | Eddie Davis | Jerome Lawrence and Robert E. Lee | March 12, 1952 |
A trucker is accused of murder because he gave a girl a lift unaware that she was dying from a bullet wound.
| 3 | "The Man From Yesterday" | Eddie Davis | Jerome Lawrence and Robert E. Lee | March 19, 1952 |
A magazine writer searches for the mysterious author of a best-selling novel.
| 4 | "Fury And Sound" | Sobey Martin | Jerome Lawrence, Robert E. Lee, and Irving Reis | March 26, 1952 |
When a megalomaniac radio program producer makes advances towards the beautiful wife of his downtrodden assistant director, the man decides to exact his revenge by putting a hidden microphone in the producer's apartment to project strange noises at all hours of the night.
| 5 | "The Slide Rule Blonde" | Eddie Davis | Jerome Lawrence and Robert E. Lee | April 2, 1952 |
A gambler tries to stop a girl who's out to break the bank at a Las Vegas casino.
| 6 | "Born Again" | Eddie Davis | Jerome Lawrence and Robert E. Lee | April 9, 1952 |
A man is tormented by a nightmare because he has been told that he is the reincarnation of another person.
| 7 | "Split Second" | Eddie Davis | Story by : Maurice Level; Teleplay by : Jerome Lawrence and Robert E. Lee | April 16, 1952 |
A man's life flashes before him as he jumps from a bridge to his death.
| 8 | "Mardi Gras" | Eddie Davis | Jerome Lawrence and Robert E. Lee | April 23, 1952 |
While Ellen Martin is exploring New Orleans, the boat she's traveling on completely changes and her aunt disappears.
| 9 | "Legal Tender" | Eddie Davis and Sobey Martin | Jerome Lawrence and Robert E. Lee | April 30, 1952 |
A girl is determined to avenge the murder of her fiance by bank robbers.
| 10 | "House Of Shadows" | Sobey Martin | Jerome Lawrence and Robert E. Lee | May 7, 1952 |
Two young lovers are falsely accused of murdering a man in an old mansion.
| 11 | "Eclipse" | Sobey Martin | Story by : Selma Lagerlöf; Teleplay by : Jerome Lawrence and Robert E. Lee | May 14, 1952 |
A tennis player accepts a bribe to lose a tournament and then pulls a double cross.
| 12 | "The Professional Touch" | Paul Landres | Jerome Lawrence and Robert E. Lee | May 21, 1952 |
A toxicologist, frustrated in love, plans a perfect crime as an emotional release.
| 13 | "The Witch Of The Eight Islands" | Eddie Davis | Story by : Robert Louis Stevenson; Teleplay by : Jerome Lawrence and Robert E. Lee | May 28, 1952 |
A seaman tries to dispose of a magic bottle that can bring him only harm.
| 14 | "The Eyeglasses" | Sobey Martin | Story by : Doris Gilbert; Teleplay by : Jerome Lawrence and Robert E. Lee | June 4, 1952 |
Elsa Carren finds a pair of eyeglasses through which she sees her husband planning to murder her.
| 15 | "Lifeline" | George Cahan | Jerome Lawrence and Robert E. Lee | June 11, 1952 |
A fortune teller predicts the advent of a tall, dark and handsome stranger in the life of a spinster school teacher.
| 16 | "False Colors" | Sobey Martin | Jerome Lawrence and Robert E. Lee | June 18, 1952 |
A 7-year-old orphan, believing that his foster parents do not want him, stows away on an airliner.
| 17 | "Leopards In Lightning" | Sobey Martin | Jerome Lawrence and Robert E. Lee | June 25, 1952 |
An American private detective tries to solve the mystery of a lost safari.
| 18 | "The Magnificent Lie" | Sobey Martin | Jerome Lawrence and Robert E. Lee | July 2, 1952 |
A doctor attending an aged alchemist pays his debts in gold.
| 19 | "The Perfectionists" | Eddie Davis | Jerome Lawrence, Robert E. Lee, and Mindret Lord | July 16, 1952 |
Two bank robbers are sheltered from the police by a woman who kills troublesome beaus.
| 20 | "Slightly Dead" | Unknown | Unknown | July 30, 1952 |
An actor, thought to have committed suicide, shows up at his own funeral.
| 21 | "The Producer" | Unknown | Unknown | August 6, 1952 |
Egotistical radio producer Kingsley Roacher browbeats his employees, especially assistant Charley Fowler, who plots a bizarre revenge.
| 22 | "The Emperor Of Nothing" | Sobey Martin | Jerome Lawrence and Robert E. Lee | August 13, 1952 |
A practical joke is played on an old man who calls himself the Emperor of Biarritz.
| 23 | "The Perfect Mrs.Clesney" | Unknown | Frank Burt and Robert Libott | August 20, 1952 |
A woman who witnessed her husband's death is led to believe that he is still alive.
| 24 | "One For The Money" | Sobey Martin | Jerome Lawrence and Robert E. Lee | August 27, 1952 |
A girl devoted 25 years of her life caring for her invalid mother, foregoing love and marriage.
| 25 | "The Mask" | George Cahan | Story by : Robert W. Chambers; Teleplay by : Jerome Lawrence, Robert E. Lee, and Budd Lesser | April 3, 1952 |
A jewelry-store engraver whose face is always bandaged commits a robbery but no one can identify him.
| 26 | "The Doctor Prescribes" | Eddie Davis | David Boehm | September 10, 1952 |
A doctor is so busy with his medical work he has little time for his wife.
| 27 | "The Puppeteers" | Sobey Martin | Doris Gilbert | September 17, 1952 |
A woman searches for her fiance, a night-club puppeteer who has mysteriously disappeared.
| 28 | "The Woman Who Left Herself" | Eddie Davis | Herb Meadow | September 24, 1952 |
A woman who tries to escape from an unhappy marriage.
| 29 | "Blackmail" | Sobey Martin | Story by : Herman C. McNeile; Teleplay by : Jerome Lawrence, Robert E. Lee, and Edith Martin | October 1, 1952 |
An actress is being blackmailed but she doesn't know by whom.
| 30 | "Mr.O" | Sobey Martin | Roy Hamilton | October 8, 1952 |
Life gets complicated for an immigrant mechanic when he is discovered to be European royalty.
| 31 | "High Adventure" | Eddie Davis | Stuart Jerome | October 15, 1952 |
A woman and her invalid son are menaced by a murderer at a remote mountain resort.
| 32 | "Bright Boy" | Eddie Davis | Jack Laird | October 22, 1952 |
A young man double crosses his partners in crime and makes off with $28,000 in stolen loot.
| 33 | "Confidentially Yours" | Sobey Martin | Robert L. Richards | October 29, 1952 |
A con man stranded in a small town, who decides to fleece the citizens.
| 34 | "Landscape In Black" | Sobey Martin | Hugh Brooke and Robert L. Richards | November 5, 1952 |
A New York art dealer searches for an eccentric artist in a South American village.
| 35 | "Desert Honeymoon" | Eddie Davis and Sobey Martin | Story by : Sam Ross; Teleplay by : Doris Gilbert | November 12, 1952 |
Alan Liveright, spending his honeymoon at a Palm Springs resort, searches for his stolen watch, a wedding present from his bride.
| 36 | "The Numbers Games" | Eddie Davis and Sobey Martin | Hugh Brooke, Tom Gries, and Patrick Whyte | November 19, 1952 |
An Army officer is haunted by the fear of death as he tries to capture an enemy position.
| 37 | "Beyond Belief" | Sobey Martin | Jerome Lawrence and Robert E. Lee | November 26, 1952 |
A psychology student assists a scientist in the creation of a mechanical mind that's capable of fantastic feats.
| 38 | "Escape To Nowhere" | Sobey Martin | Jack Laird | December 3, 1952 |
An unhappily married couple, touring Mexico, are menaced by bandits.
| 39 | "Some Day They’ll Give Us Guns" | Sobey Martin | Story by : Paul W. Fairman; Teleplay by : Tom Gries and Hal Smith | December 10, 1952 |
A German youth counselor befriends three European children orphaned by the Nazis.
