= Hollywood and the Stars =

Television documentary series

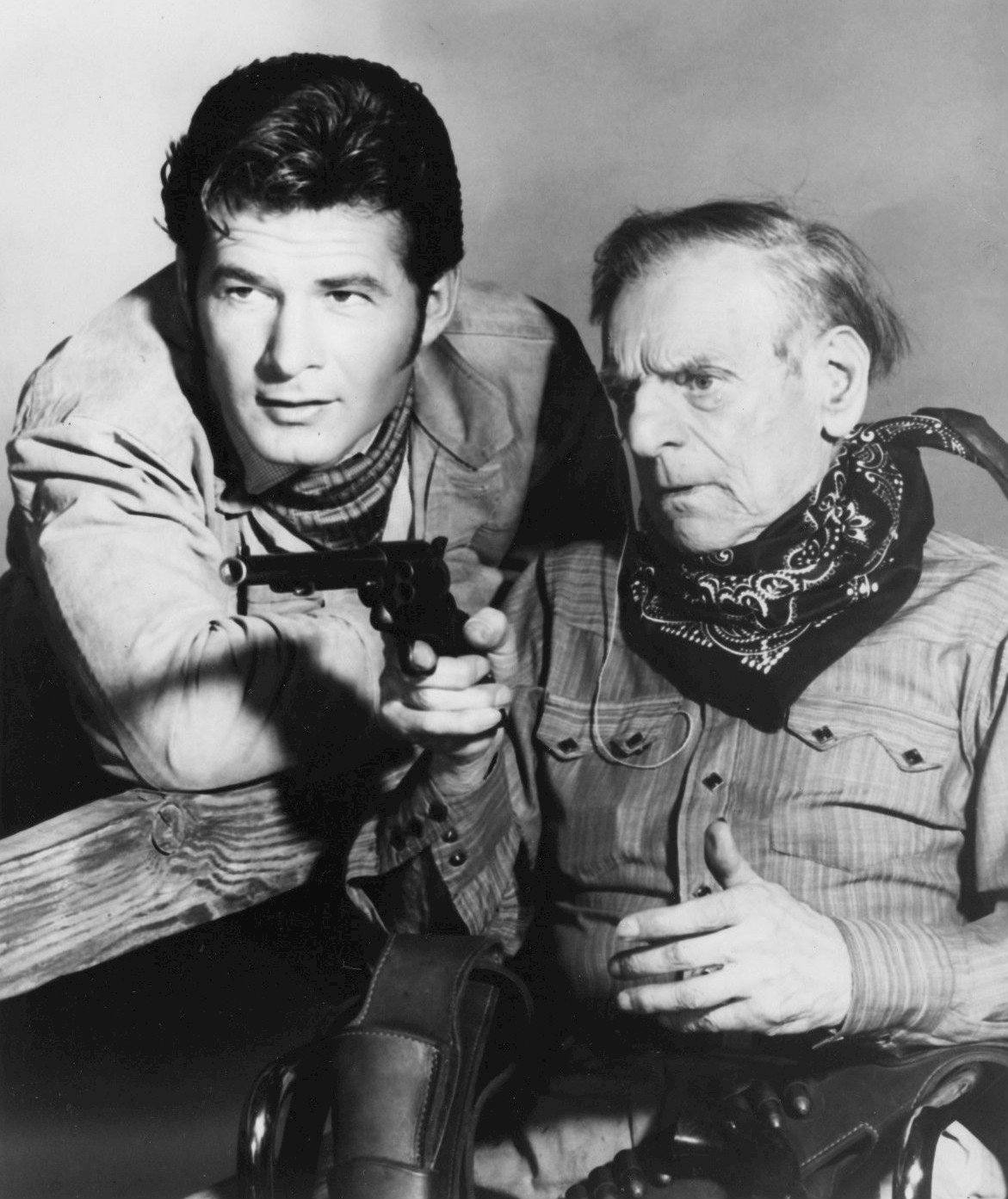
Broncho Billy Anderson, star of early Western films and Gary Clarke of television's The Virginian in "They Went That-A-Way"

Hollywood and the Stars is a 1963 NBC television documentary series produced by the David L. Wolper Production Company in association with United Artists Television. It was narrated by Joseph Cotten with the theme music and several episodes composed by Elmer Bernstein. Jack Haley, Jr. was the series' producer for all its 31 episodes. He also wrote four episodes and directed 22 episodes. He also produced the hour-long pilot episode "The Great Stars" (narrated by Henry Fonda), originally syndicated in February 1963.

Each 30-minute show concentrated on a Hollywood genre, film, or legendary star. The series ran from September 30, 1963, until May 18, 1964.

== Episodes ==
- The Man Called Bogart (9/30/1963)
- Sirens, Symbols & Glamour Girls (I) (10/7/1963)
- Sirens, Symbols & Glamour Girls (II) (10/14/1963)
- They Went That-A- Way (10/21/1963)
- The Immortal Jolson (10/28/1963)
- How to Succeed as a Gangster (11/4/1963)
- Birth of a Star (11/11/1963)
- The Unsinkable Bette Davis (11/18/63)
- The Fabulous Musicals (12/2/1963)
- The Funny Men (Part I) (12/9/1963)
- The Funny Men (Part II) (12/16/1963)
- The One and Only Bing (12/23/1963)
- Hollywood, USA (12/30/63)
- Monsters We've Known and Loved (1/6/64)
- Teenage Idols (Part I) (1/13/64)
- Teenage Idols (Part II) (1/20/64)
- Hollywood Goes To War (1/27/64)
- Anatomy of a Movie: The Cardinal (2/3/64)
- The Great Lovers (2/10/64)
- The Angry Screen (2/17/64)
- The Swashbucklers (2/24/64)
- On Location: The Night of the Iguana (3/2/64)
- In Search of Kim Novak (3/9/64)
- Paul Newman: Actor in a Hurry (3/16/64)
- Natalie Wood: Hollywood's Child (3/23/64)
- The Oscars: Moments of Greatness (Part I) (3/30/64)
- The Oscars: Moments of Greatness (Part II) (4/6/64)
- The Odyssey of Rita Hayworth (4/13/64)
- What a Way to Go!: An Extravaganza In The Making (4/20/64)
- The Great Directors (4/27/64)
- The Wild and Wonderful Thirties (5/4/64)
