= Target (American TV series) =

- Genre: Dramatic anthology
- Presented by: Adolphe Menjou
- Country of origin: United States
- Original language: English
- No. of seasons: 1
- No. of episodes: 38

Production
- Production company: Ziv Television Programs, Inc.

Original release
- Network: Syndication
- Release: March 1958 – 1958

Target is a 30-minute American television anthology series produced by Ziv Television Programs, Inc. for first-run syndication. A total of 38 episodes were aired in 1958.

The show was hosted by Adolphe Menjou. Guest stars included Angie Dickinson, Dyan Cannon, Gene Barry, Macdonald Carey, Frances Bavier, James Nolan, Patrick Waltz, Bonita Granville, Troy Melton, Fred Sherman, Joyce Meadows, Rayford Barnes, Raymond Guth, Cesare Romero, Robert Tetrick, Hugh Marlowe, Don Kennedy, Charles Wagenheim, Ken Drake and Lee Van Cleef. Others included Howard Duff, Kent Taylor, Hans Conried, Marie Windsor, and Lon Chaney Jr.

== Episodes ==
No.	Title	Directed by	Written by	Original release date
1	"Breaking Point"	William Castle	Lee Goldberg	1958
2	"Police Doctor"	Henry S. Kesler	Leonard Freeman	1958
3	"Turn Of The Tide"	Otto Lange	Story by : Peter Packer; Teleplay by : Jack Harvey	1958
4	"Edge Of Terror"	Eddie Davis	John Kneubuhl and Douglas Morrow	1958
5	"Payment In Full"	Henry S. Kesler	Stuart Jerome	1958
6	"Storm Of Violence"	Sutton Roley	Irving H. Cooper and Helen Cooper	1958
7	"Five Hours To Live"	Jack Herzberg	Arnold Belgard	1958
8	"The Last Stop"	Eddie Davis	Story by : Henry S. Kesler; Teleplay by : Stuart Jerome	1958
9	"Man On A Bike"	Eddie Davis	William Driskill	1958
10	"The Tattoo Artist"	Paul Landres	Hendrik Vollaerts	1958
11	"Bandit's Cave"	Eddie Davis	Story by : Raymond L. Bartos and Jim Byrnes; Teleplay by : Henry Sharp	1958
12	"Backfire"	Jack Herzberg	George Callahan	1958
13	"Assassin"	David Friedkin	Morton S. Fine and David Friedkin	1958
14	"Deadly Deception"	Eddie Davis	Jerry Davis and Leonard Heideman	1958
15	"Taps For The General"	Otto Lang	David Victor and Herbert Little Jr.	1958
16	"Retribution"	Eddie Davis	Story by : Vernon E. Clark; Teleplay by : Don Brinkley	1958
17	"Murder Is A Bottomless Well"	Henry S. Kesler	George and Gertrude Fass	1958
18	"So Deathly Quiet"	Otto Lang	Frederick Louis Fix	1958
19	"Winner Loses All"	Henry S. Kesler	Story by : Paul Winston; Teleplay by : Stuart Jerome and Joel Rapp	1958
20	"Once Too Often"	Jack Herzberg	Hendrik Vollaerts	1958
21	"Grudge Fight"	Henry S. Kesler	Raphael Hayes	1958
22	"Fateful Decision"	Eddie Davis	Charles B. Smith	1958
23	"Night Without Morning"	Eddie Davis	Francis Rosenwald and Marianne Mosner	1958
24	"Unreasonable Doubt"	Christian Nyby	Robert J. Shaw	1958
25	"Death Has Many Faces"	Dane Clark	David Evans	1958
26	"Turmoil"	George More O'Ferrall	Lazlo Gorog	1958
27	"Death By The Clock"	Sutton Roley	Story by : Sutton Roley; Teleplay by : Vincent Forte and Charles B. Smith	1958
28	"The Clean Kill"	George More O'Ferrall	Peggy Chantler Dick and Frederick Louis Fox	1958
29	"The Unknown"	William Conrad	Story by : Sutton Roley; Teleplay by : Charles B. Smith	1958
30	"Piano To Thunder Springs"	Lloyd Bridges	Morton S. Fine and David Friedkin	1958
31	"Death Makes A Phone Call"	Tom Gries	Lee E. Wells	1958
32	"Temporary Escape"	Terence Fisher	Story by : Alice Lent Covert; Teleplay by : Bill Barrett	1958
33	"On Cue"	Sutton Roley	Story by : Rose Simon Kohn; Teleplay by : Lee E. Wells	1958
34	"Four Against Three Million"	Bernard Knowles	Lorenzo Semple Jr.	1958
35	"The Thirteenth Juror"	John Florea	Story by : Vincent Forte; Teleplay by : Eustace Cockrell and Lee E. Wells	1958
36	"Lost Identity"	Robert Lynn	Lee Berg	1958
37	"Money-Go-Round"	Sutton Roley	Lorenzo Semple Jr., Charles B. Smith, and Lee E. Wells	1958
38	"Counterfeit Coin"	Victor Stoloff	Roscoe C. Thomas	1958
39	"The Jewel Thief"	Eddie Davis	Story by : Jerry Aldelman; Teleplay by : Stanley Niss	1958
40	"I Owe You"	William Castle	Mel Goldberg and Jack Laird	1958

== Bibliography ==
- Tim Brooks and Earle Marsh, The Complete Directory to Prime Time Network and Cable TV Shows 1946–Present, Ninth edition (New York: Ballantine Books, 2007) ISBN 978-0-345-49773-4
