= Ring Nation =

- Genre: Reality
- Presented by: Wanda Sykes; Crystal Cruz; Steve Patterson
- Country of origin: United States
- Original language: English

Production
- Running time: 30 minutes
- Production company: Big Fish Entertainment

Original release
- Network: Syndication
- Release: September 26, 2022 – 2023

Ring Nation is an American syndicated television series that premiered on September 26, 2022. Hosted by comedian Wanda Sykes, alongside Crystal Cruz and Steve Patterson as correspondents, and produced by MGM Television, the series highlights viral videos recorded via phones, home security cameras, and smart doorbells. The series is co-branded with Ring, a manufacturer of home security cameras owned by MGM Television parent company Amazon.

== Reception ==
Prior to its premiere, Ring Nation received a negative reaction from critics and media outlets over its premise, which they felt was "dystopian", and glorified surveillance and Amazon's vertical integration; Ring, producer Big Fish Entertainment (known for their former A&E series Live PD), and distributor MGM Television, are all subsidiaries of Amazon.com Inc. Big Fish Entertainment stated that the show would not be limited to footage from Ring products, and that footage would be cleared by their owner before broadcast.

Senator Ed Markey, who had been investigating Ring's business and privacy practices, described the program as normalizing "over-policing and over-surveillance" for the purposes of entertainment. Multiple advocacy groups, including MediaJustice and a petition circulated by Daily Kos, called for the show to be cancelled.
