= Your Favorite Story =

- Also known as: Your Favorite Story (Your Favorite Playhouse)
- Genre: Anthology
- Directed by: Lewis Allen; Eddie Davis; Robert Florey; Leslie Goodwins; Tom Gries; John Guillermin; Phil Karlson; Lew Landers; Christian Nyby; Ted Post
- Presented by: Adolphe Menjou
- Starring: Robert Blake; Raymond Burr; Mae Clark; Suzanne Flon; DeForest Kelley; Anita Louise; Adolphe Menjou; Ralph Morgan; Kenneth Tobey; Ray Jones
- Narrated by: Adolphe Menjou
- Country of origin: United States
- Original language: English
- No. of seasons: 1
- No. of episodes: 25

Production
- Running time: 25 mins.

Original release
- Network: NBC
- Release: January 11, 1953 – 1955

Your Favorite Story is an American syndicated TV anthology series that was broadcast in the United States from 1953 to 1955. The program was also known as My Favorite Story. It was premiered in December 1954 with the title Your Favorite Playhouse.

This program was adapted from the radio show Favorite Story which ran from 1946 to 1949. The program's 25 episodes (one source states 78 episodes) were hosted and narrated by Adolphe Menjou, who also acted in several episodes. It featured episodes originally written by Leonard St. Clair, William Makepeace Thackeray, Mary Roberts Rinehart and Frank R. Stockton.

The show was produced by Ziv Television Programs. John Guillermin directed some episodes.

The program's initial episode was an adaptation of Leo Tolstoy's "How Much Land Does a Man Need?", directed by Eddie Davis and starring Raymond Burr.
