= Jack Haley Jr. =

American film director and producer (1933–2001)

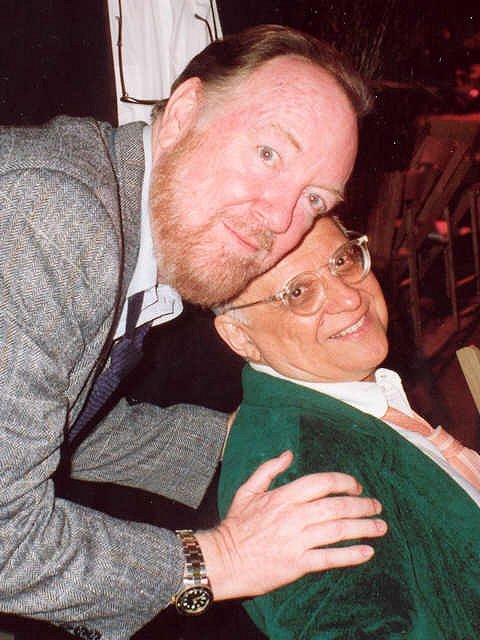
- Jack Haley Jr. (left) with columnist George Christy at the Air America premiere in 1990
- Born: John Joseph Haley III; October 25, 1933; Los Angeles, California, U.S.
- Died: April 21, 2001 (aged 67); Santa Monica, California, U.S.
- Occupations: Director; producer; writer
- Years active: 1959–1994
- Spouse: Liza Minnelli (m. 1974; div. 1979)
- Father: Jack Haley

John Joseph Haley III (October 25, 1933 – April 21, 2001), known as Jack Haley Jr., was an American director, producer, and writer, and a two-time Emmy Award recipient. His credits include directing the 1974 compilation film That's Entertainment!.

On September 15, 1974, Haley married Liza Minnelli, the daughter of Judy Garland and director Vincente Minnelli. Garland starred with his father, Jack Haley, in The Wizard of Oz.

== Early life ==
Haley was born on October 25, 1933, in Los Angeles, the son of Florence and Jack Haley, an actor and comedian. He attended Loyola Marymount University, and later studied filmmaking at USC and UCLA.

== Career ==
With David Wolper, Haley produced the original run of Biography from 1961 to 1962. He co-wrote, directed and produced Hollywood and the Stars, which was broadcast on NBC during the 1963-1964 television season.

As a producer, Haley was responsible for compilations and documentaries about film history, including That's Entertainment! (1974), That's Dancing! (1985) and The Wonderful Wizard of Oz: 50 Years of Magic (1990), narrated by Angela Lansbury. Haley's other credits include producer and executive producer of Academy Awards presentation shows. He directed the 1970 film Norwood and the 1971 film The Love Machine.

Unreleased footage shot while he was married to Liza Minnelli is featured in the 2024 documentary, Liza: A Truly Terrific Absolutely True Story.

== Death ==
Haley died of respiratory failure on April 21, 2001, in Santa Monica, California. He is buried in Culver City's Holy Cross Cemetery.

After his death, Minnelli stated, "Jack was the first one to remind the general public of our heritage. America's royalty is our entertainers, who have given so much to the world."

== Awards and honors ==
=== Peabody Award ===
Year	Association	Nominated work	Result
1966	Peabody Award	The Hidden World: National Geographic Special	Won
1962	Peabody Award	Biography	Won

=== Primetime Emmy Awards ===
Year	Association	Category	Nominated work	Result
1990	Primetime Emmy Awards	Outstanding Directing in Informational Programming	The Wonderful Wizard of Oz: 50 Years of Magic	Nominated
1987	Primetime Emmy Awards	Outstanding Informational Special	Minnelli on Minnelli: Liza Remembers Vincente	Nominated
1985	Primetime Emmy Awards	Outstanding Children's Program	The Night They Saved Christmas	Nominated
1982	Primetime Emmy Awards	Outstanding Informational Special	Hollywood: The Gift of Laughter	Nominated
1979	Primetime Emmy Awards	Outstanding Program Achievement - Special Events	51st Academy Awards	Won
1977	Primetime Emmy Awards	Special Classification of Outstanding Program Achievement	Life Goes to the Movies	Nominated
1975	Primetime Emmy Awards	Special Classification of Outstanding Program and Individual Achievement	ABC's Wide World of Entertainment "That's Entertainment: 50 Years of MGM"	Nominated
1968	Primetime Emmy Awards	Outstanding Directorial Achievement in Music or Variety	Movin' with Nancy	Won

=== Directors Guild of America ===
Year	Association	Category	Nominated work	Result
1978	DGA Award	Outstanding Directorial Achievement in Documentary	Life Goes to War: Hollywood and the Home Front	Nominated
1968	DGA Award	Outstanding Directorial Achievement in Television	Movin' with Nancy	Nominated

=== NAACP Image Awards ===
Year	Association	Category	Nominated work	Result
1980	NAACP Image Awards	Best Documentary	That's Hollywood!: Black Magic	Won

=== Monte-Carlo Television Festival ===
Year	Association	Category	Nominated work	Result
1967	Grand Prix	Best World-Wide Television Program	The Hidden World: National Geographic Special	Won

=== Venice Film Festival ===
Year	Association	Category	Nominated work	Result
1967	Venice Film Festival Silver Lion	Best Documentary	The Hidden World: National Geographic Special	Won
1965	Venice Film Festival Silver Lion	Best Documentary	Hollywood and the Stars "In Search of Kim Novak"	Won
1964	Venice Film Festival Silver Lion	Best Documentary	Hollywood and the Stars "How to Succeed as a Gangster"	Won

=== Western Heritage Awards ===
Year	Association	Category	Nominated work	Result
1965	Bronze Wrangler	Factual Television Program	Hollywood and the Stars: Episode "They Went That-a-Way"	Won

=== Western Writers of America ===
Year	Association	Category	Nominated work	Result
1995	Spur Award	Best Documentary Script	100 Years of the Hollywood Western	Won
