= Lightworkers Media =

American Christian media production company

LightWorkers Media
- Company type: Subsidiary
- Genre: Religious
- Founded: November 12, 2009; 16 years ago in California, U.S.
- Founders: Mark Burnett; Roma Downey
- Headquarters: Los Angeles, CA, United States
- Key people: Roma Downey (president)
- Products: Television series; Feature films
- Parent: United Artists Media Group (2014–15); MGM Television (2015–24); Amazon MGM Studios (2023–present)
- Website: lightworkers.com

Lightworkers Media is an American independent Christian media and film production company founded by President Roma Downey and her husband Mark Burnett and owned by Amazon MGM Studios.

LightWorkers Media produced the Emmy-nominated The Bible on the History channel as well as A.D. The Bible Continues on NBC, The Dovekeepers on CBS (based on the novel by Alice Hoffman), Women of the Bible on Lifetime, and Answered Prayers on TLC. They also produced the feature films Ben-Hur, Son of God, Little Boy, Woodlawn and On a Wing and a Prayer.

== History ==
Lightworkers Media was formed by Mark Burnett and Roma Downey with a partial stake held by Hearst Corporation, which owned a stake in Burnett's One Three Media. One of its first productions was The Bible for History, premiered in early 2013.

On September 22, 2014, MGM acquired a 55% stake in Lightworkers Media and One Three Media and consolidated the two companies into MGM's new TV production unit, United Artists Media Group, with Burnett as CEO. On December 14, 2015, MGM announced that it had acquired the remaining stakes in UAMG in a stock and cash deal, and that Burnett would become the new CEO of MGM Television, replacing the outgoing president Roma Khanna.

With MGM purchasing out of Hearst and Burnett and Downey's shares in UAMG, a channel in the works was still a planned streaming service. However, Hearst and Burnett and Downey retained their stakes in the channel. MGM announced the formation of Light TV on November 16, 2016, with a launch planned for December on thirteen Fox TV stations.

== Filmography ==
Title	Years	Network	Notes
A.D. The Bible Continues	2013	NBC	A follow-up to The Bible; co-production with United Artists Media Group
The Dovekeepers	2015	CBS	co-production with CBS Television Studios, Whizbang Films and Take 5 Productions
I Sturggle, I Rise	2017–2018	YouTube	co-production with Brookwater Films
Country Ever After	2020	Netflix	co-production with MGM Television and Evolution Media
The Baxters	2024	Amazon Prime Video	co-production with Amazon MGM Studios, Will Packer Media and Haven Entertainment

== The Bible ==
The series is the first project together from husband and wife producing team Mark Burnett and Roma Downey. In addition to Burnett and Downey, executive producers include Richard Bedser and History's Dirk Hoogstra and Julian P. Hobbs. The first episode of the mini-series was seen by 13.1 million viewers, the largest cable television audience of 2013 to date. The finale delivered 11.7 million total viewers.

The Bible shattered sales records in its first week of home video release, selling 525,000 units to become the top-selling TV miniseries of all time. In total, with subsequent airings, 'The Bible' has been seen by more than 95 million viewers.
