= World of Giants =

- Genre: Spy-fi
- Starring: Marshall Thompson; Arthur Franz
- Country of origin: United States
- Original language: English
- No. of seasons: 1
- No. of episodes: 13 (list of episodes)

Production
- Running time: 30 minutes
- Production company: Ziv Television Programs

Original release
- Network: Syndication
- Release: September 5 – November 28, 1959

World of Giants is an American 30-minute black-and-white science fiction spy-fi television series that aired in syndication from September 5, 1959, until November 28, 1959. The series starred Marshall Thompson. It was aimed to be aired on CBS but a sponsor could not be found although the series aired on Australian television in 1959, and syndicated in select U.S. markets starting in 1961.

== Premise ==
American spy Mel Hunter, while on a covert mission, is shrunk to a height of six inches after exposure to a strange radiation. The Federal Counter-Espionage Agent used his small size to infiltrate areas that a full-sized man could not. When not on assignment, he lives in a specially outfitted dollhouse-like miniature. The series co-starred Arthur Franz as his full-sized partner, Agent Bill Winters.

Thompson set up the premise in the show's opening voiceover:

It was up to me to be careful 3600 seconds of every hour. I couldn't expect the rest of the world to live my way. To the rest of the world, my problems are not a matter of life and death. The Bureau guards many fantastic secrets. But none quite so fantastic as Mel Hunter—-me. Following my escape from a nightmare behind the Iron Curtain six months ago, I watched along with 14 doctors and 17 scientists and saw myself shrink to the size of a six-inch ruler. The shrinking had stopped. The scientists were still hoping, still working on my case, and I was still a special agent... a kind of special special agent.

== Cast ==
- Marshall Thompson as Mel Hunter
- Arthur Franz as Bill Winters
- John Gallaudet as Commissioner Hogg
- Marcia Henderson as Miss Brown

== Episodes ==
No.	Title	Directed by	Written by	Original release date
1	"Special Agent"	Otto Lang	Donald Duncan and Jack Laird	September 5, 1959
Mel and Bill tries to find the secret hideout of an international spy ring. A cat traps him in a barrel.
2	"Time Bomb"	Otto Lang	Charles Lawson	September 12, 1959
Mel has to warn Bill about a time bomb in the mail.
3	"Teeth of the Watch Dog"	Monroe Askins	Joe Stone and Paul King	September 19, 1959
An actress might be involved in a spy ring.
4	"Death Trap"	Byron Haskin	Donald Duncan	September 26, 1959
A briefcase containing Mel is lost after a car accident. A squirrel seemingly as big as a grizzly bear pursues him into a gopher hole
5	"Gambling Story"	Nathan Juran	Richard Carr	October 3, 1959
A casino owner is working with foreign spies.
6	"Chemical Story"	Eugène Lourié	Meyer Dolinsky and Robert C. Dennis	October 10, 1959
Mel tries to recapture several test tubes containing experimental chemicals, but gets locked inside a refrigerator.
7	"Feathered Foe"	Nathan Juran	Dan Lundberg and Hugh Lacey	October 17, 1959
An enemy agent is using carrier pigeons to transport secret documents.
8	"The Pool"	Nathan Juran	Lawrence Mascott	October 24, 1959
Mel tries to find a codebook in a pool.
9	"Rainbow of Fire"	Harry Horner	A. Sanford Wolf and Irwin Winehouse	October 31, 1959
Bill and Mel must find a rocket that landed in the Caribbean after it malfunctioned.
10	"The Smugglers"	Nathan Juran	Fred Freiberger	November 7, 1959
Bill and Mel goes after smugglers who are smuggling people out of China.
11	"Unexpected Murder"	Jack Arnold	Meyer Dolinsky	November 14, 1959
Bill must stop a pharmacist who has been smuggling counterfeit money.
12	"Panic in 3B"	Jack Arnold	A. Sanford Wolf and Irwin Winehouse	November 21, 1959
Agents from Eastern Europe wants to kidnap Mel so they can find out what made him shrink. One reaches into his dollhouse, tears off the roof, and destroys the bathtub.
13	"Off Beat"	Harry Horner	Kay Lenard and Jess Carneol	November 28, 1959
Mel is convinced that a jazz musician is really an imposter.

== Production and distribution ==
World of Giants was produced by Ziv Television Programs, the company responsible for such hit TV series as Highway Patrol, Sea Hunt, and Bat Masterson.

A 1958 article in Variety magazine stated that CBS would be scheduling the series to be shown on Wednesdays from 8:00 to 8:30 p.m. The article described the series about a six-inch tall man by saying "Whether it is the turning on of a hose, a tipped bottle of glue, the closing of an ice box, the turning on of an electric light – each in its way is a monster or a monstrous situation for the 'little man'."

It was a high-budget program, and used sets and props built for the 1957 film The Incredible Shrinking Man.

The series was not picked up for broadcast by a major network, and a 1961 issue of Sponsor magazine stated that CBS was putting World of Giants into syndication, with a June 19, 1961 release. The series was available until at least 1964, for an entertainment industry yearbook published that year reported that CBS Films was offering the series for world-wide distribution.

== Other series with shrunken people ==
Nearly a decade later, in 1968, a similarly themed Irwin Allen science fiction TV series, entitled Land of the Giants, starring Gary Conway and Don Marshall, ran on ABC. Two years prior to that series, an animated kids TV show called Tom of T.H.U.M.B., aired as a part of The King Kong Show. In 1973, Hanna-Barbera's animated series Inch High, Private Eye, about a similarly small detective, premiered on NBC, airing for only one season. The Doctor Who Season Two, Episode One "Planet of the Giants" had the cast shrunk after a TARDIS incident.

== Home media ==
The complete series of World of Giants was released on Blu-ray from distribution company, ClassicFlix on November 7, 2023.
