= This Man Dawson =

- Genre: Crime drama
- Written by: Gene Levitt
- Directed by: Leon Benson
- Starring: Keith Andes; William Conrad (narrator)
- Country of origin: United States
- Original language: English
- No. of seasons: 1
- No. of episodes: 33

Production
- Producers: William Conrad; Elliott Lewis
- Running time: 30 mins. (approx)
- Production company: Ziv Television Programs

Original release
- Network: Syndicated
- Release: 1959 – 1960

This Man Dawson is a syndicated drama television series that was broadcast during 1959–60, starring Keith Andes as a former United States Marine Corps colonel hired to clean up police corruption in an undisclosed American city. The series was partly inspired by Andes’ Universal Studios film Damn Citizen (1958), in which he played crusading Louisiana State Police Superintendent Francis C. Grevemberg. It was a production of Ziv Television.

The program narrator is William Conrad, who was the voice on the radio version of Gunsmoke and later the narrator of The Fugitive, and who later starred in CBS' Cannon detective series. The black and white half-hour series was filmed by Ziv, later part of MGM Television.

== Notable guest stars ==
- John Archer in the episode "The Assassin"
- Walter Burke as "Jumpy" Higgins in "Plague"
- Paul Fix as Al Daniels and Joi Lansing as Carol Dawn in "Accessory to Murder"
- Clegg Hoyt in "Fight Game"
- Vivi Janiss and Karl Swenson in "Intimidation"
- Tyler MacDuff as Ira Burns in "Get Dawson"
- Judson Pratt in "The Hard Way"
- Michael Raffetto appeared in "Three X" and "The Deadly Young Man"
