= On the Menu =

- Genre: Reality; Cooking
- Presented by: Ty Pennington; Emeril Lagasse
- Country of origin: United States
- Original language: English
- No. of seasons: 1
- No. of episodes: 10

Production
- Executive producers: Mark Burnett; Dean Houser
- Production company: One Three Media

Original release
- Network: TNT
- Release: October 3 – December 5, 2014

On the Menu is an American reality competition series that aired on TNT. It was the first cooking show that gave viewers the chance to taste the winning dish. In each episode, four home cooks battled for the chance to have their dish served in a national restaurant chain. The show featured Ty Pennington as host and Emeril Lagasse as menu master. It was produced by Mark Burnett.

== Format ==
Each episode begins with the cooks demonstrating they understand the featured restaurant during a preliminary challenge. In the second round, the three remaining contestants create a new dish for the restaurant. The dishes are served to diners whose votes determine which two cooks will move onto the final round. In the final round, the cooks have the opportunity to perfect their dishes based on comments they received from the diners before serving them to Ty, Emeril and representatives of the restaurant. Those representatives determine the winner, whose dish was put on the restaurant's menu the next day.

== Episodes ==
No.	Title	Challenge	Winning Dish	Air Date
1	Chili's	Burgers	Meat & Three Burger	October 3, 2014
2	Denny's	Breakfast	Apple Danish Stuffed French Toast	October 10, 2014
3	California Pizza Kitchen	Pizza	Korean Barbecue Pizza	October 17, 2014
4	Planet Hollywood	Dessert	Raspberry Chocolate Brownie Cheesecake	October 24, 2014
5	Emeril's	Seafood	Crab Lasagna	October 31, 2014
6	The Cheesecake Factory	Asian	Vietnamese Meatball Sub	November 7, 2014
7	Cabo Wabo Cantina/Sammy's Beach Bar	Mexican	Shrimp Enchilada Stack	November 14, 2014
8	Outback Steakhouse	Steak sandwich	Market Steak Melt	November 21, 2014
9	Buca di Beppo	Pasta	Fresh Harvest Pappardelle/Beppo's Soffici Cuscini	November 28, 2014
10	Dickey's Barbecue Pit	New Dish	Stampede Stew	December 5, 2014

- This episode had two winners (Nicole & Lynn), both dishes are available on the menu.
