= Miami Undercover =

American TV syndicated crime drama series (1961)

- Genre: Crime drama
- Directed by: Howard W. Koch
- Starring: Lee Bowman; Rocky Graziano
- Theme music composer: Johnny Green
- Country of origin: United States
- Original language: English
- No. of seasons: 1
- No. of episodes: 38

Production
- Producers: Howard W. Koch; Aubrey Schenck
- Camera setup: Single-camera
- Running time: 25 minutes
- Production company: Ziv-United Artists

Original release
- Network: Syndication
- Release: January 23 – October 9, 1961

Miami Undercover is a low-budget 30-minute American crime drama series that aired in broadcast syndication in 1961 for a total of 38 episodes. The series stars Lee Bowman (who had previously played sleuth Ellery Queen on television) and boxer-turned-actor Rocky Graziano. Most episodes were shot on location in Miami.

== Synopsis ==
Jeff Thompson is a private investigator working for the Miami Hotel Owners' Association. Each episode featured "a different beauty contest winner".

== Cast ==
- Lee Bowman as Jeff Thompson
- Rocky Graziano as Rocky

== Episodes ==
No.	Title	Directed by	Written by	Original release date
1	"The Thrush"	Howard W. Koch	Steve Fisher	January 23, 1961
2	"Calypso Lady"	Unknown	Unknown	January 30, 1961
3	"Damita"	Unknown	Unknown	February 6, 1961
4	"The Clown"	Unknown	Unknown	February 13, 1961
5	"Bet Your Death"	Howard W. Koch	Ellis Kadison	February 20, 1961
6	"Miss Venus"	Unknown	Unknown	February 27, 1961
7	"Miss Miami Beach"	Unknown	Unknown	March 6, 1961
8	"Triple Cross"	Unknown	Unknown	March 13, 1961
9	"One Hour to Noon"	Unknown	Unknown	March 20, 1961
10	"Cha Cha Caper"	Unknown	Unknown	March 27, 1961
11	"The Tom Dane Story"	Unknown	Unknown	April 3, 1961
12	"Precious Jade"	Unknown	Unknown	April 10, 1961
13	"Wrong Pigeon"	Howard W. Koch	Story by : P.K. Palmer; Teleplay by : John C. Higgins	April 17, 1961
14	"Sunken Treasure"	Howard W. Koch	Gerald Drayson Adams	April 24, 1961
15	"Murder After Death"	Unknown	Unknown	May 1, 1961
16	"Blowup"	Unknown	Unknown	May 8, 1961
17	"The Rocky Caper"	Unknown	Unknown	May 15, 1961
18	"Kitty"	Unknown	Unknown	May 22, 1961
19	"Operation Hurricane"	Unknown	Unknown	May 29, 1961
20	"Cukie Dog"	Unknown	Unknown	June 5, 1961
21	"The Assassin"	Unknown	Unknown	June 12, 1961
22	"The Baby Sitter"	Unknown	Unknown	June 19, 1961
23	"A Bullet Waits"	Unknown	Unknown	June 26, 1961
24	"Mystery of the Swamp"	Unknown	Unknown	July 3, 1961
25	"Auto Motive"	Unknown	Unknown	July 10, 1961
26	"Demise of an Artist"	Unknown	Unknown	July 17, 1961
27	"The Big Frame"	Unknown	Unknown	July 24, 1961
28	"The Swami"	Unknown	Unknown	July 31, 1961
29	"Room 9"	Unknown	Unknown	August 7, 1961
30	"Credit Unlimited"	Unknown	Unknown	August 14, 1961
31	"The Victims"	Unknown	Unknown	August 21, 1961
32	"Study in Mosaic"	Unknown	Unknown	August 28, 1961
33	"Tiny Thief Caper"	Unknown	Unknown	September 4, 1961
34	"The Lethal Ledger"	Unknown	Unknown	September 11, 1961
35	"A Woman's Weapon"	Unknown	Unknown	September 18, 1961
36	"School for Girls"	Lee Sholem	Herbert Abbott Spiro	September 25, 1961
37	"Goodbye to Joan"	Unknown	Unknown	October 2, 1961
38	"Storm Over Diana"	Unknown	Unknown	October 9, 1961

== Production ==
United Artists' (UA) Aubrey Schenck-Howard W. Koch Productions filmed 38 episodes of Miami Undercover in Florida in the fall of 1959. Limited time slots for syndicated series and an excess of shows that featured private investigators resulted in the show's not being broadcast until January 1961. By then UA had acquired Ziv Productions, whose sales people helped to gain 141 markets for the show. An additional factor was that the UA-Ziv combination had no other new programs to meet its commitments for January 1961.
