= Lawbreakers (TV series) =

Lawbreakers, a.k.a. Lee Marvin Presents Lawbreaker, is a 30-minute American docudrama crime anthology series. It was produced by Rapier Productions Incorporated in association with United Artists Television for first-run syndication. Hosted and narrated by Lee Marvin, its stories were dramatizations and re-enactments of actual criminal cases. Thirty-two episodes were aired between 1963 and 1964.
