= Drill Time =

Single by Slim Jesus

Single by Slim Jesus
- Released: January 9, 2017
- Recorded: 2015
- Genre: Drill
- Length: 2:56
- Songwriter: Robert Church
- Producer: Cocky Beats

Slim Jesus singles chronology
"Deuce Deuce" (2016)	"Drill Time" (2017)	"Buck Buck" (2017)

Alternative cover
- Original cover

Music video
- "Drill Time" on YouTube

"Drill Time" is a single by American rapper Slim Jesus, first released on July 20, 2015 through SoundCloud. A music video for the song was released on August 18, 2015, which led it to viral status stemming from controversies regarding cultural appropriation.

The song was released to streaming services on January 9, 2017.

== Background ==
Slim Jesus claims to have found the beat for the song on YouTube. In a phone interview with Complex, he stated that "Drill Time" is his first successful song and reached 4,000 views within its first day of being published on the site.

== Composition ==
The song finds Slim Jesus rapping in a flow that has been described as similar to that of rapper Lil Herb. The topics that he raps about in the lyrics include killing people, stealing one's girlfriend, and threatening to attack those who oppose him.

== Music video ==
The music video begins with a disclaimer saying the illegal materials in the visual are merely props. Slim Jesus, wearing True Religion and a three-figure belt, appears with his crew as they brandish and aim guns at the camera and flaunt money as well.

== Controversy ==
The song and its video received heavy criticism upon release, bringing discussions surrounding cultural appropriation as well as the authenticity of the song. Rappers Lil Mister and Ben Sommers released diss tracks aiming at Slim Jesus, with the former accusing him of stealing rapper Chief Keef's sound and the latter accusing him of using BB guns in the video.

In an interview with DJ Vlad, Slim Jesus stated the content in his music is fictitious and he does not actually live the lifestyle that he raps about.
