= Alex Lagemann =

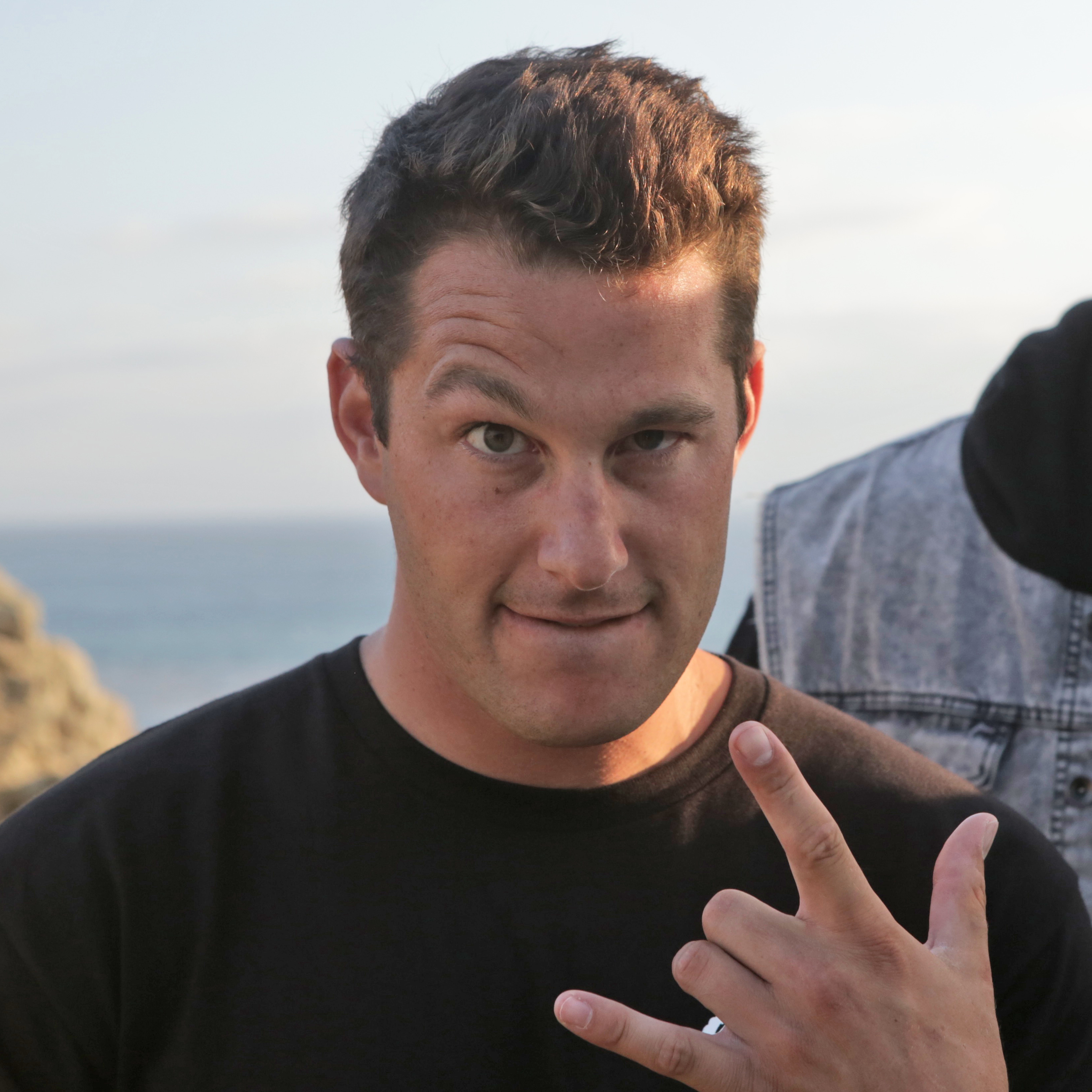
- Lagemann in 2015.

Background information
- Also known as: Loggy
- Born: Alexander Robert Lagemann; July 28, 1989 (age 37); Capitola, California, U.S.
- Genre: Alt-pop
- Occupations: Musician, Athlete, TV Personality
- Instruments: Vocals, Rhythm guitar

Alexander Robert Lagemann (born July 28, 1989) is an American singer-songwriter, TV personality, and former collegiate athlete. During his time playing football at UC Berkeley, he began making hip-hop music, which eventually led him to start the band, Radical Something, in 2011. On May 2, 2016 it was revealed that Lagemann would be starring in Mark Burnett's new unscripted dating show, "Coupled", on FOX.

== Early life ==
Alexander Robert Lagemann was born on July 28, 1989, in Capitola, California, to Roy and Luci Lagemann. The family eventually relocated to Saratoga, California. Lagemann has an older brother, Augie, and two younger twin brothers, Gian and Peter.

As a high-schooler, Lagemann excelled in sports and academics, earning a full-scholarship to play wide receiver at the University of California, Berkeley.

=== 2003–2007: High School ===
Lagemann attended Saratoga High School, where he participated in football, basketball, baseball, and track and field. As 3-year starter on the football team, Lagemann was named to multiple All-State, All-County, and All-League teams.

=== 2007–11: College Football career ===
In 2007, Lagemann attended UC Berkeley and was a member of the football team as a wide receiver. In 2009, Lagemann earned First-team Pac-10 All-Academic honors.

=== 2011–present: Radical Something ===
After releasing multiple solo albums under the name 'Loggy', Lagemann formed the band Radical Something in 2011 with his football teammate, Michael Costanzo (DJ Big Red), and singer, Josh Hallbauer (Josh Cocktail). Lagemann and Costanzo were roommates in college and collaborated on Lagemann's solo work. Radical Something has now released 5 albums and completed multiple national tours.

=== 2016: Coupled ===
In 2016 Lagemann appeared on Coupled.
