= Pirate Master =

American reality television series

- Genre: Reality competition
- Created by: Mark Burnett
- Presented by: Cameron Daddo
- Music by: Russ Landau
- Country of origin: United States
- Original language: English
- No. of seasons: 1
- No. of episodes: 14

Production
- Production location: Dominica
- Running time: 60 minutes

Original release
- Network: CBS; CBS Innertube
- Release: May 31 – August 28, 2007

Pirate Master is an American reality television show created by Mark Burnett and broadcast on CBS. The show followed sixteen modern-day pirates on their quest for a gold treasure valued at US$1,000,000. The show was hosted by Cameron Daddo and was filmed around and on the Caribbean island nation of Dominica.

Pirate Master premiered Thursday, May 31, 2007. The show also aired on CTV in Canada and Sky3 in the United Kingdom, and premiered on June 21, 2007, on Network Ten in Australia, and on July 4, 2007, on AXN Asia. Due to low ratings, CBS cancelled Pirate Master on July 24, 2007 after airing only eight of its 14 episodes. Following this, the series was posted on CBS Innertube, with the last six episodes debuting each week on Tuesday mornings.

== Premise ==
Pirate Master is centered around a fictional story of the pirate captain Henry Steel and the "Treasure of Zanzibar". After acquiring the treasure, Steel divided the loot into 14 parts and hid them across the island of Dominica. A special chest, the Chest of Zanzibar, contains fifteen locked compartments, each containing maps and clues to help find one of the stashes. Fourteen of the keys — all but the key for the first compartment — are each hidden with one of the hidden treasures; thus, the treasures must be found, and the compartments opened, in a predetermined order. The final compartment contains a map showing the location of every gold stash on the island of Dominica, leading to the grand prize.

=== Expeditions ===
The Black and Red Crews row away from the Picton Castle at the start of the first expedition

Each week, the contestants are divided into two crews, Black and Red, to hunt for the treasures indicated by the maps and clues obtained from the most recently opened compartment in the Chest of Zanzibar. If the captain and officer positions are occupied (see below), they are automatically assigned to the black crew, while all remaining players draw colored gunshots out of bags to determine their crew. The black crew gains the extra player when an odd number of contestants are available.

Both crews simultaneously go on expeditions and decipher clues along the way to find gold coins hidden around the island of Dominica. During the expedition, there is the potential for the currently leading crew (based on the trailing member of the team) to "sabotage" the other crew, slowing them down, such as by causing a net to fall to block passage along a river. There also may be booby traps that can slow down the leading team. The first crew to successfully retrieve the treasure — even if the other crew arrived and started searching first — wins the treasure, and indicates their victory by firing a blunderbuss.

=== Captain and Officers ===
Following the first expedition, the winning crew must elect one of their own to be the ship's captain. The captain must then select two crew-mates to be officers. The captain receives the right to claim half of the treasure for themself, in additional to other luxuries, but must also nominate three contestants for elimination. The officers each receive a smaller share of the treasure, and claim lesser luxuries.

After being elected, the captain leads the black crew on the next expedition. If the black crew wins, the captain retains their position automatically and may opt to keep or change their officers as desired. If the red crew wins, the captain and officers are all demoted; the crew-mates on the winning team then elect from among themselves a new captain, who chooses two new officers. When eight contestants remain, the officer position is eliminated entirely.

=== Treasure ===
Most of the treasure found at the end of each expedition comes in the form of gold coins, which can be divided among the winning crew. After the coins are counted and the total value (which varies) is established, the captain claims 50%, the officers share 25%, and the rest of the winning crew members share the remaining 25% of the gold; when necessary, distributions are rounded to the nearest $100. The coins are distributed to the crew members immediately, and may be used as in-game currency, allowing the contestants to strike deals with each other and vie for long-term security. This money cannot be stolen by other players. Of the total $1 million prize, $500,000 was distributed through the show in this manner.

=== Pirates' Court ===
Pirates' Court is held; Daddo (in front) addresses those with the Black Spot (left), the Captain and his Officers (upper right), and the remaining crew (right), with the Chest of Zanzibar in the front right.

At the end of each episode, all contestants attend Pirates' Court to determine who will be eliminated. Prior to a court proceeding, the Captain distributes letters to the other contestants, three of which contain a black ink blot (called a "black spot"). The three contestants receiving black spots are nominated to be voted off and cannot take part in the voting process that follows; the captain and officers are not allowed to vote either. The remaining crew members then cast their votes by impaling their ballots on an upturned dagger. The contestant with the most votes is then "cut adrift" (i.e., voted off the show). In case of a tie, the captain decides which of the tied players he will cast adrift. However, contestants may instead opt to cast their vote for mutiny against the captain. Should the voting contestants do so unanimously, then the officers will individually vote for or against the mutiny; if they both agree with the crew, the Captain will be cut adrift. If either officer disagrees with the mutiny, the mutiny fails, and the captain can then choose any player (including among those that were not originally nominated) to be set adrift.

The fourth episode introduced a "Royal Pardon" found in the treasure. Prior to the distribution of the next Black Spot letters, any player (including the captain and officers) may bid secretly for the pardon. At the Pirates' Court, after the votes have been placed, the winning bid of the pardon is announced, and the bid amount is paid to whoever previously held the pardon. If the player holding the pardon receives the most votes, that player is safe, and the next highest vote earner is cut adrift, and the pardon is removed from the game. If the pardon-holder does not receive the most votes, they retain the pardon but must sell it to a different player via silent auction by the next Pirates' Court. The Royal Pardon is removed from the game after the ninth Pirate Court, whether it's used or not.

When there are eight players remaining, the captain selects two players for Black Spots. Because there are no officers, a unanimous vote for mutiny will result in the captain being set adrift immediately.

=== Ghost Crew ===
The eighth episode introduced a "Ghost Crew" made up of the previously eliminated players. On episode 8, the remaining players in the game compete as a single Black Crew against the Ghost Crew. Should the Black Crew win, the rest of the game played out as normal. If the Ghost Crew should win, they not only keep the treasure, but get to decide which three of the remaining players would get the Black Spot for the Pirate's Court, and there would be no Captain or Officers until the next expedition.

The Ghost Crew, now incorporating all eliminated players up to that point, returned in the Finale to eliminate one of the final three.

=== End Game ===
When only three competitors are left, an expedition is performed, with each player competing against the others. The first player to the treasure becomes Captain and receives the expedition's treasure, and is guaranteed to be competing for Captain Steele's bounty. The other two players face a Pirate's Court made up of the previously eliminated players, who ultimately decide which player joins the Captain in the final expedition.

The final two players, prior to the final expedition, each select three additional crew members from the previously eliminated contestants to assist them on the expedition. The final expedition includes portions that only the finalist can perform in addition to where teamwork can be used. The finalist who is the first to find Captain Steele's treasure wins $500k and the title of Pirate Master.

== Features ==
The show is notable for its evocative setting and props. Much of the show takes place on the ship, called the Picton Castle, but the contestants also disembark and explore island rivers and muddy riverbanks in search of gold. Skeletons, keys, and other pirate-themed paraphernalia are scattered about the foggy island environment.

Other stereotypical pirate-like features include pirate-themed music, pirate-like clothing (the captain and the officers don garments signifying their superior rank), and the performance of laborious chores aboard the ship. The ship's main mast sports a Jolly Roger, stylized with a Pirate Master logo.

The ship itself was crewed by the actual crew of the Picton Castle, though the contestants did assist with trimming the sails and other tasks.

== Contestants ==
List of Pirate Master contestants and notable crews
Contestant	Original crew	Ghost crew (Note: The eight previously cut adrift contestants returned as a "Ghost Crew" to compete for that episodes treasure and decide which of the remaining contestants would receive a Black Spot.)	Final expedition (Note: In the final expedition, Ben and Christa participated in a schoolyard pick from the previously cut adrift contestants to help them become Pirate Master.)	Finish
John Lakness; 25, Carlisle, Massachusetts	Black Crew	Ghost Crew	Red Crew	1st cut adrift
Christian Okoye; 45, Enugu, Nigeria	Red Crew	Ghost Crew		2nd cut adrift
Alexis Shubin; 26, Laguna Beach, California	Black Crew	Ghost Crew		3rd cut adrift
Cheryl Kosewicz; 35, Sparks, Nevada	Black Crew	Ghost Crew	Black Crew	4th cut adrift
Sean Twomey; 27, Venice, California	Red Crew	Ghost Crew		5th cut adrift
Jocelyn "Joy" McElveen; 21, West Columbia, South Carolina	Red Crew	Ghost Crew		6th cut adrift
Joe Don Morton; 36, Fairbanks, Alaska	Black Crew	Ghost Crew		7th cut adrift
Elicia "Jupiter" Mendoza; 30, Los Angeles, California	Black Crew	Ghost Crew	Black Crew	8th cut adrift
Azmyth Kaminski; 26, Los Angeles, California	Red Crew	Black Crew	Black Crew	9th cut adrift
Nessa Nemir; 29, Berkeley, California	Red Crew	Black Crew	Red Crew	10th cut adrift
Kendra Guffey; 38, Los Angeles, California	Black Crew	Black Crew		11th cut adrift
Laurel Schmidt; 21, Los Angeles, California	Red Crew	Black Crew		12th cut adrift
Louie Frase; 43, Fishing Creek, Maryland	Black Crew	Black Crew		13th cut adrift
Jay Hatkow; 37, Detroit, Michigan	Red Crew	Black Crew	Red Crew	14th cut adrift
Christa DeAngelo; 29, Tamaqua, Pennsylvania	Red Crew	Black Crew	Red Crew	Runner Up
Ben Fagan; 23, Charleston, South Carolina	Black Crew	Black Crew	Black Crew	Pirate Master

== Episodes ==
No.	Title	Treasure hidden by	Original release date
1	"I Want That Treasure"	Unknown	May 31, 2007
The contestants board the Picton Castle and recover the Chest of Zanzibar. Joe Don becomes arrogant upon taking the role of Captain. Although he led the Black Crew to victory in the first expedition, John was unanimously cut adrift for annoying the crew and threatening to steal the compasses.
2	"Pirates, Guns and Money"	Felipe Sanchez Grios, The Master Gunner	June 7, 2007
Joe Don initiates an alliance with Jay to trade money for information. Joy injures her knee during the expedition. Joe Don's arrogance as Captain dampens the ship morale. Christian is cut adrift for slowing down the expedition crews.
3	"Bribes, Lies, and Vengeful Eyes"	The Quarter Master	June 14, 2007
Azmyth leads the Red Crew to its first victory and becomes the new Captain. While some are excited when Azmyth shares the wealth, others question his newfound British accent. Jay attempts to bribe Sean into voting against Cheryl. However, Alexis is cut adrift due to her volatile attitude and lack of teamwork.
4	"Death by Coconuts"	Olivier Le Grand, The Master Craftsman	June 21, 2007
Several ladies privately discuss their dislike for Nessa's flirting. The Black Crew loses the expedition when Azmyth leads them astray. The Royal Pardon is revealed. Joe Don's ultimatum to Jay backfires when Jay reveals their alliance. Louie, the new Captain, seeks to fulfill his vendetta against ex-captain Joe Don for hoarding the treasure. At Pirate's Court, Cheryl is cut adrift for alienating herself from the crew early on.
5	"Loose Lips Sink Ships"	Barnabas Bagley, The Pilot	June 28, 2007
Christa conquers her fear of heights. Sean butts heads with Jay and Nessa. Azmyth regains the role of Captain, then chooses Ben and Jay as officers to form an alliance of strong men. Joe Don lends Nessa money to buy the Royal Pardon, but Azmyth turns the tables by not marking her with the Black Spot. Sean is cut adrift for being untrustworthy.
6	"Lambs to the Slaughter"	The Bosun	July 5, 2007
Jupiter takes over the cook's role. The crew begins to resent Azmyth's change in personality as captain. The Triad of Azmyth, Ben, and Jay leads the Black Crew to victory. They decide to strengthen their team by marking weaker Joy and Kendra, and strong Joe Don with Black Spots. After a close vote, Joy is cut adrift.
7	"A Deal with the Devil"	Christopher DeGrout, The Purser	July 10, 2007
The Triad works Joe Don and Louie hard with ship chores to weaken them before the expedition. After another Black Crew victory, Jay offers Kendra safety in trade for a vote against Joe Don. Jupiter squashes the crew's hopes of mutiny. Joe Don and Nessa's feelings for each other grow stronger. Without the safety of the Royal Pardon, Joe Don is cut adrift in favor of keeping personable Louie.
8	"Spirits in the Material World"	The Navigator	July 17, 2007
Jay calls out Kendra for going back on her word. The previously cut adrift pirates return as a Ghost Crew to compete against the current crew. Unfortunately, John loses the Ghost Crew's key and costs them the victory. At dinner, Jupiter announces the crew's thoughts of mutiny in hopes that Azmyth will choose new Officers. Instead, Azmyth interprets her warning as a threat and marks her with a Black Spot. Having alienated herself at dinner, Jupiter is cut adrift by the crew.
9	"24 Hour Party Pirates"	Samuel James, The Cook	July 24, 2007; Online Only
The eight remaining pirates are summoned to an all night party in a hideaway. The day after, Cameron reveals that Jay and Ben are no longer officers, and they take part in the expedition on the Red Crew leaving Azmyth without his triad for protection on the Black Crew. The Red Crew wins and elects the first woman captain, Christa. She is given all the booty from the expedition. Christa feels the pressure of being Captain and fears she could get a Black Spot after she departs the Captain's Quarters. Jay gives Christa a plan to make money. Christa is to tell Kendra she would receive part of "her share" of the treasure in the form of the last Pardon purchase, double cross her by not purchasing it, and then cut her adrift. Christa ends up sticking to her word and actually purchases the Pardon, surprising Jay. Azmyth and Kendra are put up at Pirate's Court. The crew decides to cut Azmyth adrift, keeping Kendra safe once again.
10	"Chickens with Their Heads Cut Off"	The Cooper	July 31, 2007; Online Only
Seven pirates remain as Christa begins her first full mission as captain. She admits that Jay has been the mastermind of the ship since the beginning, but keeps him and Ben close in a secret pact in order to win more booty. They mislead Nessa into believing that she is to be among the planned "final four". In the expedition, the Black Crew narrowly defeats the Red Crew, maintaining Christa's captaincy. Christa black spots Kendra and a surprised Nessa. At Pirate's Court, Nessa understates her athleticism by proclaiming to the crew that Kendra's weak swimming is more likely to cause a mission loss then her strengths could cause a win. She also openly accuses Ben, Jay, and Christa of a secret alliance which they deny. Despite this, the pirates unanimously vote her out.
11	"A Judas in Their Midst"	Amal Patel, The Smuggler	August 7, 2007; Online Only
The remaining six pirates sleep in the next morning, attributed to their more lenient captain, Christa. Also allowing swim breaks and sharing the better food, Christa hopes this will keep everyone happy with her captaincy. She continues to plot with Ben and Jay, and the three agree that the Black Crew has to win the expedition. When Jay is placed on the Red Crew, he gives minimal effort, allowing the Black Crew to win yet again. To the dismay of the Black Crew, the expedition resulted in no treasure, as "A. Patel" took it for himself. Jay and Christa agree that Kendra's time has come, and Louie casually volunteers to be the other pirate to receive the Black Spot, as he is sure he will stay. At Pirate's Court, it is publicly revealed that Louie volunteered to be Black Spotted, and he faces scrutiny for having so much confidence he is safe, as Kendra has already survived five Black Spots. In the end, however, the vote is unanimous, and Kendra is finally cut adrift.
12	"Liar, Liar...Pirates on Fire"	Renshu Chao, The Astronomer	August 14, 2007; Online Only
The final five pirates remain, and Ben and Christa deliberate on Jay's methods/schemes to remove the captain (Christa) from power. The expedition begins with a swim as the two crews go in search of the Astronomer's treasure. Laurel lags in the swim, slowing Louie down. Ben, Jay and Christa find difficulties along the way, but manage to pull through and win $30,000 in loot. Back on the ship, Jay, Ben and Christa go at each other's necks on the issue of betraying each other and lying. Ben shows his true colors to Jay, and Jay does the same, as Christa goes into a meltdown of emotions. Once the Black Spots are handed out, Jay is surprised as he finds out that Laurel and Ben have been spotted. At Pirate's Court, Laurel is cut adrift after a tie in votes and Christa choosing her over Ben, deciding to compete against the strongest rather than the weakest.
13	"Dirty Deeds…Not Done Dirt Cheap"	Lars Christensen, The Carpenter	August 21, 2007; Online Only
Ben is stuck on the Red Crew, separated from Christa and Jay. His attempts at throwing the expedition work, as the Black Crew walks away with $40,000 in treasure. Christa splits the treasure with the other pirates. She Black Spots Ben and Louie, promising Jay that he will not be getting a black spot. In the end, Jay decides to stick with his alliance and sets Louie adrift, leaving him, Christa, and Ben as the final three pirates.
14	"Master of Pirates"	Jenson Buley, The First Mate & Captain Steel	August 28, 2007; Online Only
The final three face off head to head to find the First Mate's treasure. Ben becomes the new captain upon claiming that treasure and secures himself a shot at Captain Steele's $500,000. At Pirate's Court, the Ghost Pirates make sure Jay is the first of the three eliminated. Feeling bad for throwing the previous expedition, Ben makes amends and gives Louie his cut. From there, Ben and Christa choose from those cast adrift to form teams of four to help one of them find Henry Steel's final treasure. Most offer themselves to Christa. In response Ben offers his previous winnings as incentives for his crew; Christa matches his offer. Ben chooses Cheryl, Azmyth, and Jupiter. Christa picks Jay, John, and Nessa. Ben ultimately wins, making him the Pirate Master.

== Weekly crew assignments ==
Episode	1	2	3	4	5	6	7	8	9	10	11	12	13	14	
Winning Crew	Black Crew	Black Crew	Red Crew	Red Crew	Red Crew	Black Crew	Black Crew	Black Crew	Red Crew	Black Crew	Black Crew	Black Crew	Black Crew	Ben	Black Crew
Booty Found	$40,000	$45,000	$35,000	$5,000	$40,000	$40,000	$35,000	$50,000	$50,000	$40,000	$0	$30,000	$40,000	$50,000	$500,000
Crew Member	Crew / Booty share														
Ben	$5,000	$5,625	-	$833	$6,666	$8,000	$7,000	$10,000	$12,500	$10,000	$0	$10,000	$12,000	$30,000	$500,000
Christa	-	$2,250	$5,000	-	-	$5,333	-	$3,333	$22,500	$10,000	$0	$10,000	$12,000	$10,000	-
Jay	-	-	$5,000	-	$6,666	$8,000	$7,000	$10,000	$12,500	$10,000	-	$10,000	$11,000	$10,000	-
Louie	$2,000	$2,250	$5,000	$833	-	-	-	$3,333	-	-	$0	-	$5,000		
Laurel	-	-	-	-	$6,666	$5,333	$7,000	$3,333	-	$10,000	-	-			
Kendra	$2,000	-	$5,000	$833	$6,666	-	-	$3,333	$2,500	-	-				
Nessa	-	$2,250	$5,000	$833	-	-	-	$3,333	-	-					-
Azmyth	-	$2,250	$5,000	-	$6,666	$8,000	$7,000	$10,000	-						-
Jupiter	$2,000	$2,250	$5,000	-	$6,666	-	$7,000	$3,333							-
Joe Don	$20,000	$22,500	-	-	-	-	-	-							
Joy	-	-	-	$833	-	$5,333		-							
Sean	-	-	-	$833	-			-							
Cheryl	$5,000	$5,625	-	-				-							-
Alexis	$2,000	-	-					-							
Christian	-	-						-							
John	$2,000							-							-

== Voting history ==
Episode #:	1	2	3	4	5	6	7	8	9	10	11	12	13	14	Final Mission
Pardon Holder	Pardon Not Available			Joe Don ($7,000)	Nessa ($9,000)	Joe Don ($12,000)	Nessa ($5,000)	Kendra ($4,000)	Christa ($10,000)	Pardon Expired					Final Mission
Cut Adrift	John; 10/10; Ballots	Christian; 5/9; Ballots	Alexis; 4/8; Ballots	Cheryl; 4/7; Ballots	Sean; 5/6; Ballots	Joy; 3/5; Ballots	Joe Don; 3/4; Ballots	Jupiter; 3/3; Ballots	Azmyth; 5/5; Ballots	Nessa; 4/4; Ballots	Kendra; 3/3; Ballots	Laurel; 1/2; Ballots	Louie; 1/1; Ballot	Jay; 12/13 Ballots	Final Mission
Voters	Ballots														Final Mission
Ben	Officer	Officer	Alexis	Joe Don	Officer	Officer	Officer	Officer	Azmyth	Nessa	Kendra	Black Spot	Black Spot	Captain	Pirate Master
Christa	John	Christian	Cheryl	Cheryl	Sean	Kendra	Joe Don	Jupiter	Captain	Captain	Captain	Laurel^{2}	Captain	Black Spot	Runner-Up
Jay	John	Christian	Officer	Cheryl	Officer	Officer	Officer	Officer	Azmyth	Nessa	Kendra	Laurel	Louie	Black Spot	
Louie	Black Spot	Kendra	Cheryl	Captain	Black Spot	Joy	Black Spot	Jupiter	Azmyth	Nessa	Black Spot	Ben	Black Spot	Jay	
Laurel	John	Kendra	Black Spot	Cheryl	Black Spot	Joy	Joe Don	Black Spot	Azmyth	Nessa	Kendra	Black Spot		Jay	
Kendra	John	Black Spot	Cheryl	Cheryl	Sean	Black Spot	Louie	Black Spot	Black Spot	Black Spot	Black Spot			Christa	
Nessa	John	Kendra	Cheryl	Officer	Sean	Joy	Black Spot	Jupiter	Azmyth	Black Spot				Jay	
Azmyth	John	Christian	Alexis^{2}	Black Spot	Captain	Captain	Captain	Captain	Black Spot					Jay	
Jupiter	John	Christian	Officer	Joe Don	Louie	Kendra	Joe Don	Black Spot						Jay	
Joe Don	Captain	Captain	Alexis	Black Spot	Sean	Black Spot	Black Spot							Jay	
Joy	Black Spot	Black Spot	Alexis	Joe Don	Sean	Black Spot								Jay	
Sean	John	Christian	Alexis	Officer	Black Spot									Jay	
Cheryl	Officer	Officer	Black Spot	Black Spot										Jay	
Alexis	John	Kendra	Black Spot											Jay	
Christian	John	Black Spot												Jay	
John	Black Spot													Jay	

== Critical reception ==
Pirate Master did not perform well in ratings, drawing in only 7 million viewers on the premiere episode, and subsequent showings drawing in less. Joshua Alston of Newsweek called the debut episode a "confusing muddle". Some critics have considered that the failure of both Pirate Master and On the Lot represent not only troubling issues for Mark Burnett, but for reality television as well. In the UK from episode 5 onward, the show was moved from its Sunday night primetime slot on Sky's main entertainment channel Sky1 to Monday nights at 6 p.m. on Sky3; a channel which usually only shows content from Sky1 but on a 12-18 month delay. The final episodes were aired on Sky3 at 7 a.m. on a Saturday morning. In Australia, free-to-air Channel Ten moved the show from its 7.30 p.m. Tuesday timeslot to Sunday afternoons on July 27. CBS moved the show from Thursday at 8 p.m. to Tuesday at 10 p.m. After continued low ratings, CBS canceled Pirate Master on July 23, 2007 and aired the remaining episodes on CBS Innertube.

Despite being removed from American television in mid-run, the show went on to win an Emmy award in the category of outstanding original main title theme music.

== Post Show ==
Cheryl Kosewicz, the fourth person to leave the game, was found dead inside her home on July 27, 2007, after an apparent suicide. The show paid respects to her death in the final episode with a brief blackscreen dedication message before the final credits. On fellow contestant Nessa's MySpace webpage, Cheryl blamed the show for causing friction between herself and her boyfriend, who committed suicide two months prior.

== Footnotes ==
^Note 1: Booty awards are based only on the amount of money directly given to each player as a result of winning the treasure hunt. Booty that may be exchanged afterward is not counted in this column, due to the inability to verify these amounts from the show as presented; however, the CBS Pirate Master Wiki includes a "Treasure Tracker". that may include these values.

^Note 2: In the event of a tie, the Captain decides who is to be cut adrift.
