= Picton Castle (ship) =

Sail training vessel

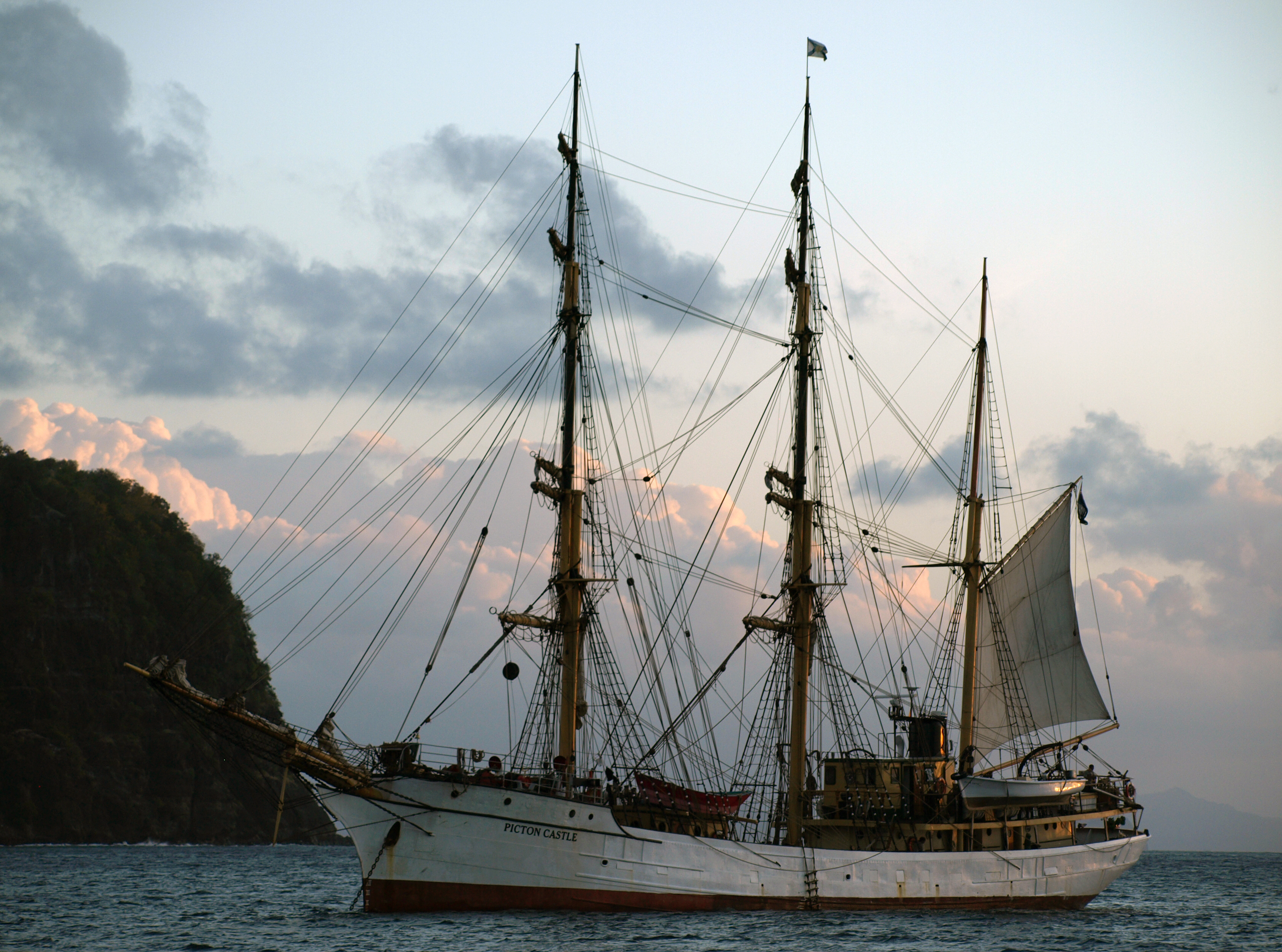
- The barque Picton Castle anchored off Carriacou in 2009.

History

Cook Islands
- Name: Picton Castle
- Namesake: Picton Castle
- Port of registry: Cook Islands
- Completed: 1928
- Home port: Lunenburg (unofficial)
- Identification: IMO number: 5375010; MMSI number: 518000019; Callsign: E5WP
- Status: Active

General characteristics As sailing ship
- Type: Barque
- Length: 179 feet (55 m)
- Propulsion: 690 hp diesel engine
- Sail plan: Three-masted barque; Sail area: 12,450 square feet (1,160 m^{2})
- Crew: 12 professional crew, up to 40 trainees

Picton Castle is a tall ship used for deep-ocean sail training and long distance education voyages. The ship was the subject of the television series Tall Ship Chronicles which documented her second voyage around the world in 2001. The ship has carried out seven world voyages to date - completing the seventh one in 2019. While flagged in the Cook Islands, the ship's unofficial home port is Lunenburg, Nova Scotia.

In December 2006 a crew member, Laura Gainey, was swept overboard from the ship in the Atlantic Ocean and presumed drowned. The death was investigated by the Cook Islands government, which concluded that the death was accidental. A subsequent investigation by the Transportation Safety Board of Canada found that a lack of safety equipment and the ships' master's decision to sail with an inexperienced and untrained crew contributed to the death.

== Configuration ==
Picton Castle is rigged as a three-masted barque, is 179 feet (55 m) long, with a riveted steel hull, clear oiled pine decks, steel masts and wooden and steel yards. She carries 12,450 square feet (1,160 m^{2}) of sail. The ship displaces 565 tons. She has a 690-horsepower Burmeister & Wain 7 cylinder Alpha diesel engine for the times when sailing is not feasible. The ship has space for roughly 52 people, consisting of about 12 professional crew and 40 sail trainees.

== Operational history ==
=== As a trawler, minesweeper, and freighter ===
Picton Castle was originally built as a steam powered fishing trawler in 1928 in Selby, Yorkshire. She was built along with four other trawlers for the same company and operated out of Swansea, Wales. The ship was named after the Welsh castle of the same name.

In August 1939, the Royal Navy requisitioned the trawler for use in World War II and refit her as a minesweeper. While sweeping mines near Norway, she made way for the port of Bergen for repairs. The Germans had just left Norway, and the sight of the Union Jack-bearing HMS Picton Castle earned her the title "The Liberator of Norway." Following World War II, the ship was renamed Dolmar and worked as a freighter in the North Sea and Baltic Sea.

In 1955 she was repowered with a diesel engine. In 1965 she was again repowered with her current B&W Alpha.

=== Acquisition and refit ===
During the early 1990s, Daniel Moreland acquired the ship while seeking a vessel to convert to a barque. With the help of a small crew he brought her across the Atlantic Ocean, eventually ending up in Lunenburg, Nova Scotia where she began her multimillion-dollar refit.

=== As a sailing ship ===
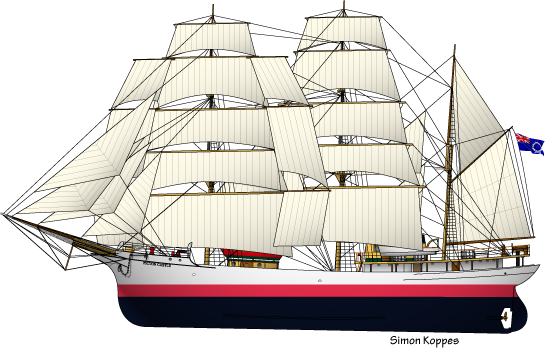
Line art of Picton Castle

Picton Castle's first world circumnavigation voyage took place from 1997 to 1999. She has since sailed around the world six more times, for a total of seven global circumnavigations. She has also visited the Great Lakes twice, sailed numerous times on tours of the East Coast of the Americas, completed a Caribbean Voyage and in 2008 sailed to Europe, Africa and the Caribbean on a Voyage of the Atlantic.

The ship is used for educational voyages and sail training, with a core crew of 10 to 12 teaching up to 40 trainees basic sailing techniques and ship maintenance. When not sailing, the ship operates a "Bosun school", teaching ship-related skills such as rigging and boat-repair.

In the spring of 2007, Picton Castle was featured in Mark Burnett's CBS reality show Pirate Master. The show was filmed in the Caribbean island of Dominica and premiered May 31, 2007.

In October 2013 Picton Castle participated in the International Fleet Review 2013, the centennial anniversary of the Royal Australian Navy, in Sydney, Australia along with fifteen other tall ships. In 2014 she sailed in the South Pacific before returning to Lunenburg in late May, 2015.

In June 2019 Picton Castle returned from its seventh around-the-world voyage. Plans for an eighth voyage in 2020 were postponed to 2021 due to the COVID-19 pandemic.

== Death of Laura Gainey ==
On the night of December 8, 2006, as Picton Castle was roughly 475 miles (413 nmi) south-east of Cape Cod, Massachusetts, the ship encountered bad weather. A wave swamped the ship, sweeping overboard crew member Laura Gainey, daughter of Bob Gainey. Gainey was not wearing a life jacket or a survival suit but was expected to be able to survive up to 36 hours due to warm water temperatures. A search for her by the Picton Castle, aircraft of the United States and Canadian Coast Guards, and nearby merchant vessels, was unsuccessful and called off after three days, and the ship continued on its voyage.

An investigator from Maritime Cook Islands interviewed the crew on its arrival in Grenada. A formal inquiry was established in March 2007, and reported back in July, concluding that Gainey was an "unlucky victim" of an accident and that no changes needed to be made. A slightly rewritten version of the report was issued in August 2007 recommending the use of safety harnesses. In November 2007 the Transportation Safety Board of Canada announced it would conduct its own inquiry into the death. Later that month an investigation by the CBC program The Fifth Estate claimed that the Picton Castle was ill-prepared to sail, discouraged the use of safety equipment, and had doctored statements given to the Maritime Cook Islands inquiry. It also alleged that Maritime Cook Islands had ignored the initial investigation report and instead cast blame upon Gainey.

In July 2008 the TSB released its inquiry. The report found among the "causes and contributing factors" that the decision to set to sea did not sufficiently take into account the long-range weather forecasts, especially in view of the crew's qualification and experience; Gainey did not get enough sleep in the 1–2 days before the accident; most likely miscommunication on the fatal evening resulted in her still getting up every hour instead of getting rest; the port breezeway of the ship was designated "off-limits" by the ship's master, but due to inefficient communication, Gainey seems to have remained unaware of that order; in the heavy weather, no safety nets were rigged on the ship; safety lines were rigged, but safety harnesses were not worn, and there were no "established fastening points" (other than the safety lines) to which to clip safety harnesses. The captain of the Picton Castle accepted the findings, and adopted improved safety procedures.

== Images ==
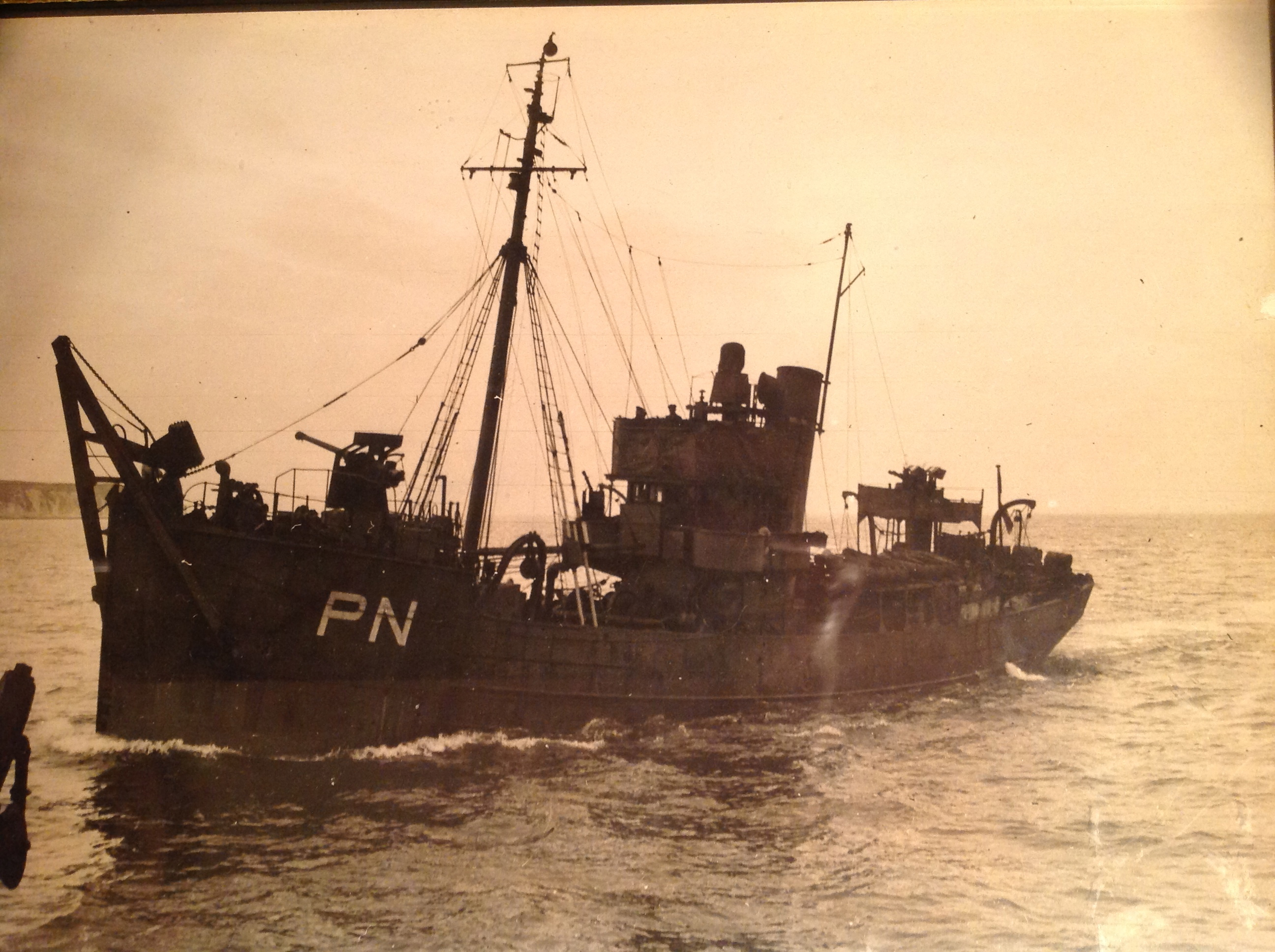
Picton Castle as a minesweeper during the Second World War

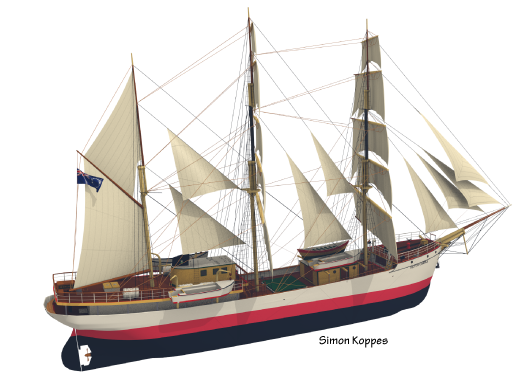
Bird's eye view of Picton Castle

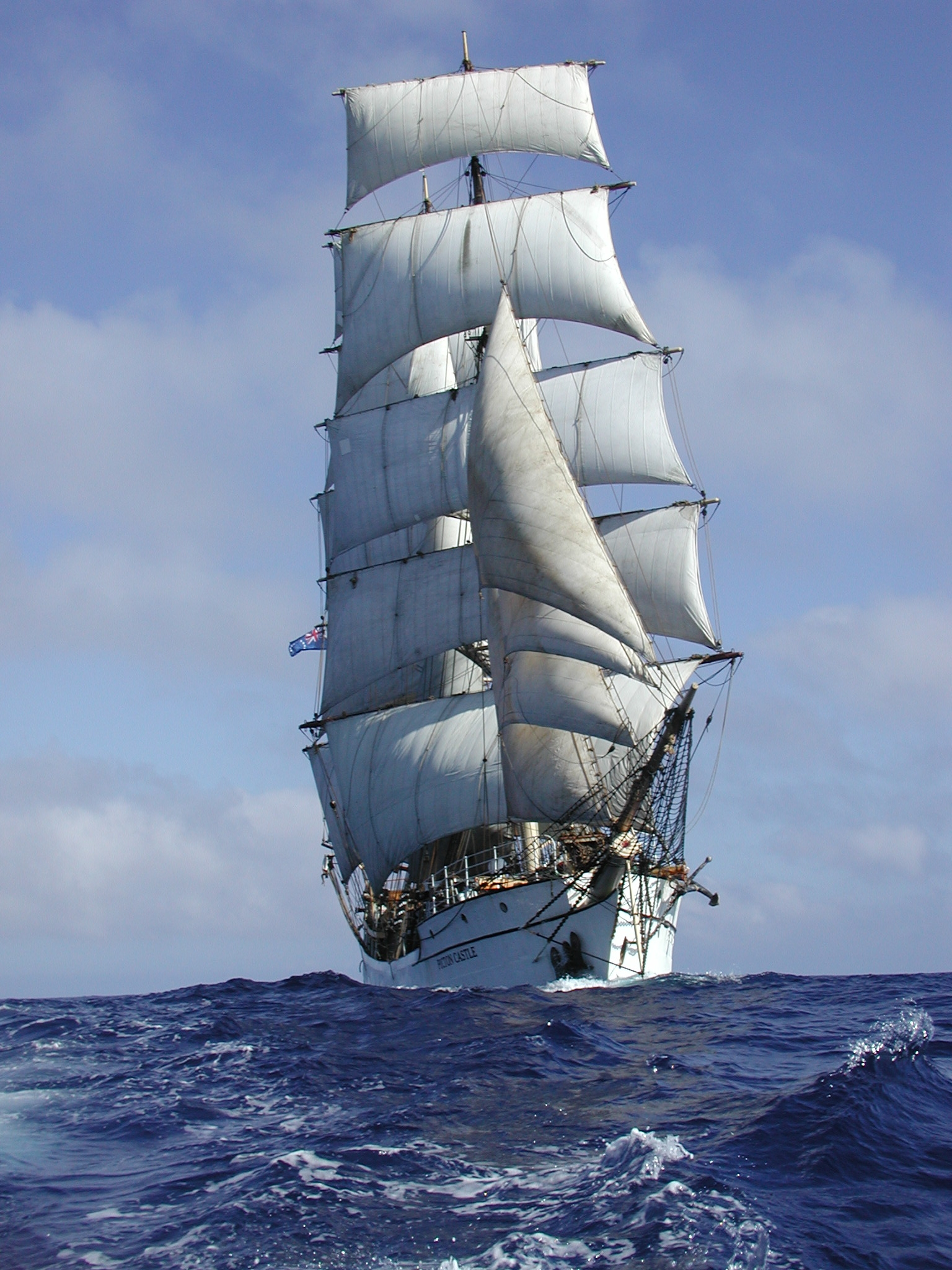
Picton Castle under full sail

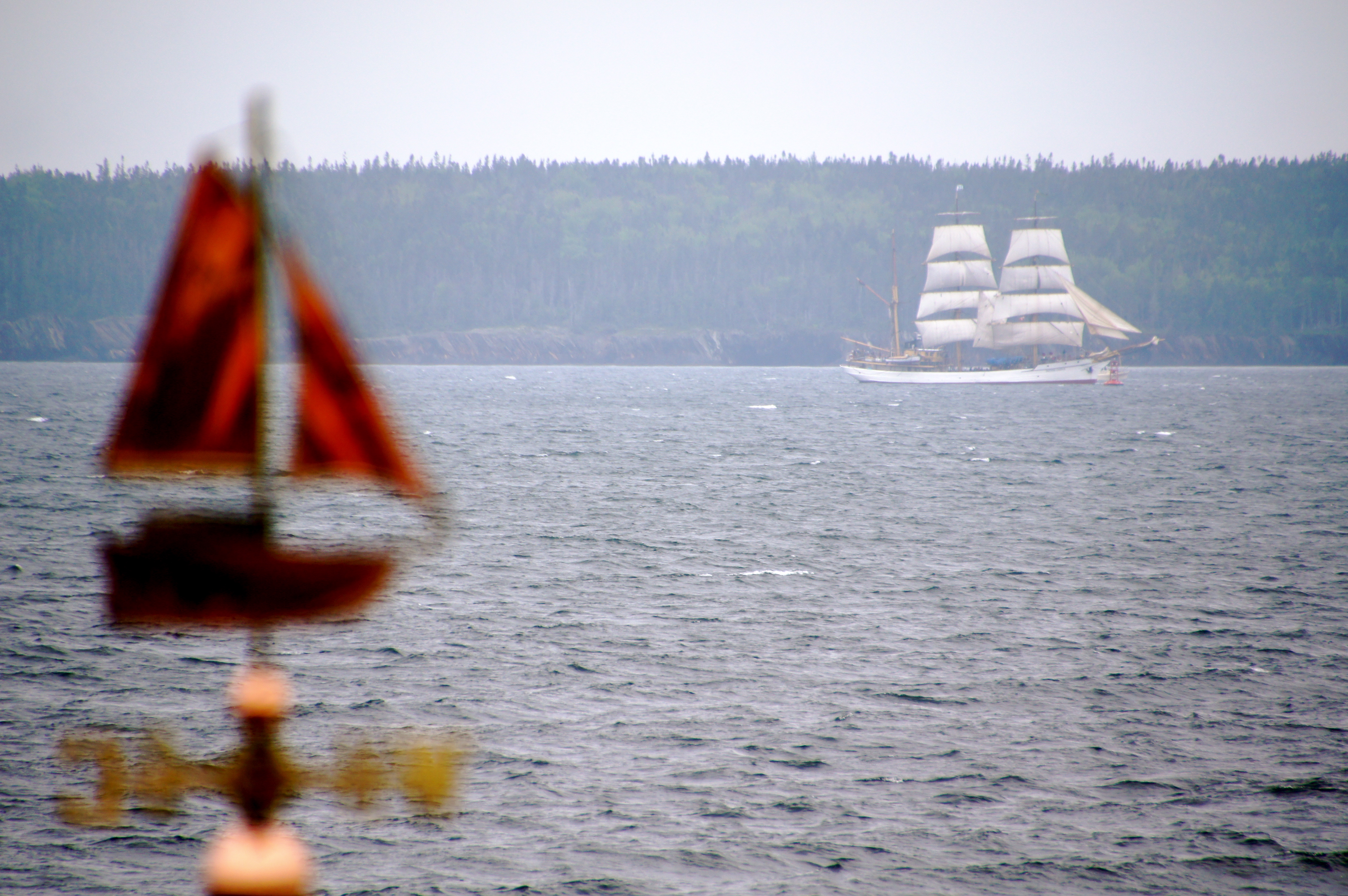
The Picton Castle sailing into Lunenburg Harbour.

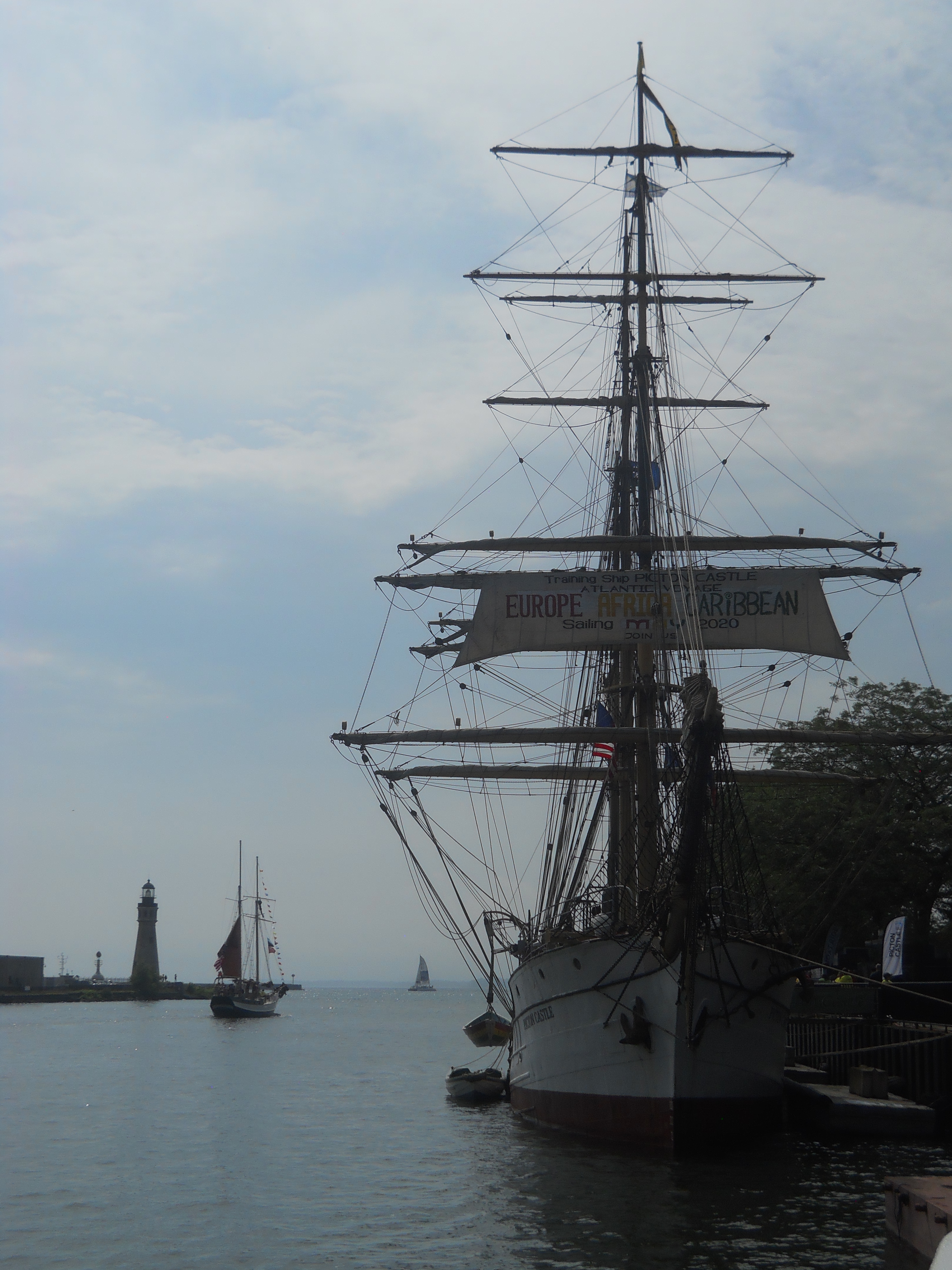
The Picton Castle on July 6, 2019, at the first Tall Ships festival in Buffalo, New York
