= Radical Something =

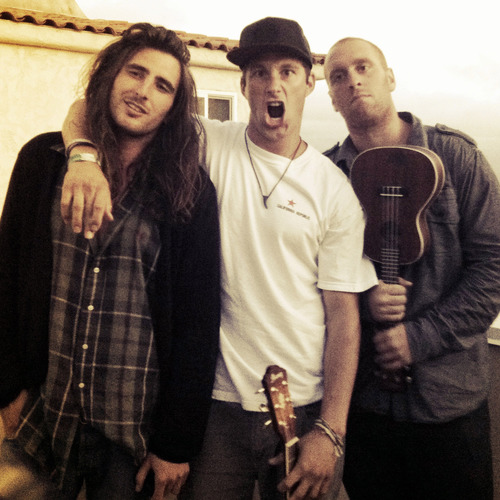
- Josh Cocktail, Loggy, and Big Red

Background information
- Origin: California
- Genres: Alternative, hip hop, reggae, pop
- Occupations: Musicians, songwriters, producers, actors, athletes
- Years active: June 2011–2016
- Label: Independent
- Members: Loggy; Josh Cocktail; Big Red
- Past members: Matt Murad; Hughie Stone Fish
- Website: weareradical.com

Radical Something is an American musical trio composed of Alex Lagemann (Loggy), Josh Hallbauer (Josh Cocktail), and Michael Costanzo (Big Red). According to Billboard.com the trio "blends hip-hop and rock with a decidedly Californian vibe". Their newest offering, a 7-song EP entitled "Hot Sauce" was released independently on November 4, 2016.

== Career ==
=== 2011: Formation & We Are Nothing ===
Lagemann and Costanzo met while attending UC Berkeley as football teammates. Lagemann began his music careers recording hip-hop songs in his college apartment; Costanzo was a DJ. In February 2011, Costanzo met Josh Hallbauer at a New York City recording studio. In their first session together, they wrote the song "Be Easy" (Feat. Kinetics), and uploaded an acoustic video of the record to Costanzo's YouTube page. The video was seen by photographer, Bruce Weber, who immediately hired the trio to act in and produce a short soundtrack for his short, "Don't Steal The Jacket"—a 24 minute film for Moncler Jacket's 2012 Winter campaign. When filming wrapped Costanzo, and Hallbauer chose to cancel their flights home in favor of recording more songs together. The trio spent 2 weeks at a home studio in Boca Raton, Florida, finishing 7 songs, and ultimately deciding to form the band, Radical Something.

The newly formed group finished 8 more songs in the following months, and released their debut album "We Are Nothing" on September 20, 2011. Led by singles "Be Easy", "California", "Escape" and "Long Hair Don't Care", We Are Nothing, was downloaded over 50,000 times and reached #9 on the iTunes Alternative Albums chart.

=== 2012: No Sweat & Summer of Rad ===
On February 26, 2012, Radical Something released their second project No Sweat, a six song EP. No Sweat reached #6 on the iTunes overall album chart and #33 on the Billboard Independent Albums chart. In Spring 2012, Radical Something's first national headlining tour brought the trio to 25 major cities and college towns in the US. Following the No Sweat Tour, the band had supporting performances for Slightly Stoopid, Capital Cities Asher Roth and SOJA.

In Summer 2012, Radical Something announced "The Summer Of Rad", a weekly release series spanning 13 weeks from June through August. The Summer Of Rad was deemed a viral success garnering over 500,000 song downloads and millions of online streams.

=== 2013: Ride It Out ===
On May 5, 2013 they released "We Were Just Kids", the lead single from their upcoming album Ride It Out entering the top 100 on iTunes Alternative single charts and reaching #1 on the Twitter Music Emerging Artist Chart, holding this position for a full week.

Ride It Out, was released on September 2, 2013 debuting at #3 on the iTunes Alternative Album Charts.

In support of the album, the group took their Ride It Out Tour to 30 U.S. cities. The tour featured opening acts Outasight and Down With Webster. In September they then joined Timeflies and Sammy Adams on the Warning Signs Tour for 8 concerts across Arizona, Texas, Georgia, Florida, and North Carolina.

=== 2014: North American Tours and "Cali Get Down" ===
The Spring of 2014 saw the group support the EDM act Krewella and hip-hop artist Logic on the Verge Campus tour, which spanned 25 college shows across America. On July 22 the band announced via their Facebook page that they would be joining Matisyahu as direct support on a 50 city North American tour which would run from September 14 through November 14 and reach 30 US States and Canada. On July 28 they released their newest single, "Cali Get Down", which was co-produced by David Kahne and Goodwill & MGI. The music video was released later that week via YouTube.

Radical Something's concert in St.Petersburg, Florida has been uploaded to YouTube later. A live album named after its venue, Jannus Live, was released, shortly after.

=== 2015: Summer of Rad 2015 ===
Radical Something brought back their Summer of Rad concept from 2012, with 10 songs released over the course of 10 weeks. The first song, "Down South," was released on June 29.

=== 2016: Hot Sauce ===
On November 4 Radical Something released their 7-song EP "Hot Sauce". It was preceded by the singles "Paradise In You" and "One Soul".

== Members ==
- Josh Hallbauer – lead vocals (2011–present)
- Mike Costanzo – bass, guitar, keyboard, percussion, backing vocals (2011–present)
- Alex Lagemann – rap vocals, guitar(2011–present)

Alex Lagemann is a Director at Cushman & Wakefield.

== Discography ==
=== Albums ===
- We Are Nothing (2011)

#	Track	Duration
1	"Long Hair Don't Care"	3:14
2	"Escape"	3:21
3	"Lookin' for Love"	3:04
4	"Be Easy" (Featuring Kinetics)	3:40
5	"Puppy Love"	3:02
6	"Radio"	3:41
7	"Give Me a Sign"	3:39
8	"No Lovin'"	3:47
9	"Gonna Be Good"	2:07
10	"Come with Me"	3:10
11	"California"	3:28
12	"Freedom"	3:26
13	"Hey Babe"	5:01
14	"We Are Radical"	3:36
15	"Be Easy" (acoustic)	3:09

- Ride It Out (2013)

#	Track	Duration
1	"We Were Just Kids"	3:43
2	"Moustache"	3:31
3	"Spraypaint"	3:18
4	"Cheap Drink"	3:28
5	"Pure"	4:24
6	"I Miss The Hell Out Of You"	1:55
7	"Harsh My Mellow"	3:20
8	"Bottles At The Moon"	2:49
9	"Long Way Home"	3:33
10	"Already There"	2:58
11	"Little Bit Louder"	3:04
12	"Nothing To Lose"	3:03
13	"Feels Like Forever"	3:34

- Jannus Live (2015 Live Album)

#	Track	Duration
1	"Intro (Live)"	0:36
2	"Escape (Live)"	3:32
3	"California (Live)"	3:59
4	"Say Yes (Live)"	3:41
5	"Cheap Drink (Live)"	4:17
6	"Cali Get Down (Live)"	3:56
7	"Spraypaint (Live)"	4:27
8	"Pure (Live)"	4:33
9	"Step Right Up (Live)"	2:21
10	"Sun Down (Live)"	4:24
11	"Be Easy (Live)"	4:10

=== EPs ===
- No Sweat (2012)

#	Track	Duration
1	"You Feel Amazing"	3:20
2	"Say Yes"	3:23
3	"Acid Rain"	3:18
4	"Valentine"	3:43
5	"Vibe To This"	3:20
6	"Waterfalls"	3:14

- Hot Sauce (2016)

#	Track	Duration
1	"Paradise In You"	3:00
2	"Stressed Out"	3:38
3	"One Soul"	3:06
4	"Red Flags"	3:28
5	"Shine"	3:01
6	"Pyramids"	3:51
7	"Paradise In You" (Young Bombs Remix)	4:04

=== Compilations ===
- The Summer of Rad (2012)
1. Sky Is Born
2. All These Times
3. Lemonade
4. Start Livin'
5. Tomorrow
6. Santa Barbara
7. Letter To Our Friends
8. Spread Your Wings
9. Step Right Up
10. Tequilla Kiss
11. Hang Out
12. Cutty Spot
13. Naked In Venice
- Take a Hit (2012)
1. California
2. Be Easy ft. Kinetics
3. Say Yes
4. Waterfalls
5. Lookin' for Love
6. Sun Down
7. Acid Rain
8. Escape
9. Vibe To This
10. Long Hair Don't Care
11. Wash Away
12. You Feel Amazing
13. California (Demo)
14. Freedom (Demo)
15. Long Hair Don't Care (Demo)
- Summer Of Rad 2.0 (2015)
1. Down South
2. World Of Mine
3. Tropical
4. Superhero
5. California, Pt. 2
6. T-Shirt
7. Cool Me Down
8. Better Off ft. Matisyahu
9. Can't Stop Now
10. Paradise In You

== Music videos ==
Year	Song	Director(s)
2011	"Be Easy" (featuring Kinetics)	
2011	"Escape"	Alexi Papalexopoulos
2011	"Come With Me"	Joe Nash
2011	"California"	Bradley Miles
2011	"Sun Down"	Joe Nash
2011	"Freedom"	Joe Nash
2012	"Valentine"	Joe Nash
2012	"Say Yes"	Joe Nash
2012	"You Feel Amazing"	Joe Nash
2012	"Letter To Our Friends"	Joe Nash
2012	"Step Right Up"	Joe Nash
2012	"Naked In Venice"	Shannen Doherty
2013	"We Were Just Kids"	Alexi Papalexopoulos
2013	"Santa Barbara"	Brian Christ
2013	"Spraypaint"	Brian Christ
2013	"Bottles at the Moon"	Jakob Owens
2013	"Feels Like Forever"	Lance Lowry
2014	"Pure"	Shannen Doherty
2014	"Cali Get Down"	Mike Irving
2015	"World Of Mine"	Brian Christ
2015	"Superhero"	Adam McArthur
2015	"California, Pt.2"	Brian Christ
2015	"T-Shirt"	Brian Christ
2015	"Can't Stop Now"	Brian Christ
2015	"Paradise In You"	Logan Paul
2016	"One Soul"	Tyler Jack
