= Kym Gold =

American fashion and home design executive

- Born: Kymberly Goldberg; United States
- Occupations: Fashion designer, Fashion and home design executive

Kym Gold is an American fashion and home designer and executive. She is the founder of Bella Dahl, Hippie Jeans, Babakul, and Style Union Home, and the co-founder of designer jeans brand True Religion. Gold's designs have been worn by David Beckham, Tom Ford, Angelina Jolie, Donna Karan, Heidi Klum, Jennifer Lopez, Madonna, Gwyneth Paltrow, Gwen Stefani, Holly Robinson Peete, and Justin Timberlake. Her work has been included in Vogue, Elle, Harper's Bazaar, InStyle, and Rolling Stone magazines.

== Early life ==
Gold was born in Malibu, California to a Jewish family. She has said she has "a lot of family in Israel and Masada." She is an identical triplet.

Gold attended two years of college, and then she "got bored, and started my own business. That's just my personality." She got her start in the fashion industry by buying overages and damages, such as t-shirts and sweatshirts, from factories, which she would then take to a dye house to have re-dyed, and then resell them at college swap-meets and on the boardwalk of Venice Beach. She eventually had five employees, including one of her sisters. "With various swap meets, I was making about $50,000 a month."

== Career ==
=== True Religion ===
In 2002, Gold and her then-husband, Jeff Lubell, co-founded True Religion, a high-end denim line catering to all body types. The company eventually went public on the Stock exchange.

According to Gold's autobiography, she served as vice president of True Religion. She created designs, and Jeff would source materials. Lubell and Gold's management styles conflicted, with Gold blaming a toxic, masculine corporate culture at the company, led by Lubell. Lubell managed the board of directors and Gold's role was often minimized. The couple separated, and Lubell filed for divorce on February 14, 2007. True Religion informed Gold that she was no longer part of the company as an employee, though she would remain a board member.

In 2013, True Religion sold to TowerBrook Capital Partners for over $800 million. In 2017, True Religion declared bankruptcy.

=== Other business ventures ===
In 2008, Gold started Babakul, a bohemian chic clothing line sold in Southern California. Heidi Klum, Tom Ford, Gwyneth Paltrow, and Madonna have worn Babakul.

In 2015, Gold released her memoir and business advice book Gold Standard: How to Rock the World and Run an Empire. The book was edited by Sharon Soboil and published by Skyhorse.

Gold founded Los Angeles-created ceramic design company Style Union Home, later renamed dumæ. It was created in 2020 during the middle of the COVID-19 pandemic.

== Personal life ==
Gold's first husband was producer Mark Burnett. The couple married in 1988 at Gold's parents Malibu home, and divorced after one year.

About a year later, Gold began dating Jeff Lubell. They later also became business partners and co-founders of True Religion. The two eventually moved in together, got married, and had children. They have three sons, Jake, Ryan, and Dylan. The couple filed for divorce in 2007.

Today, Gold is married to television and film actor Marlon Young. The couple met through a mutual friend, Eric Benét.

Gold has noted Gloria Steinem as someone she admires, stating, "Any woman who is a pioneer or leader is an inspiration to me, the women's movement was a huge step for women in general. However, we still have a long road ahead to be equal to men in the world of business." Gold is also a philanthropist, supporting causes concentrating on women's health issues, such as breast cancer research.
