= List of awards and nominations received by Mark Burnett =

Mark Burnett awards and nominations
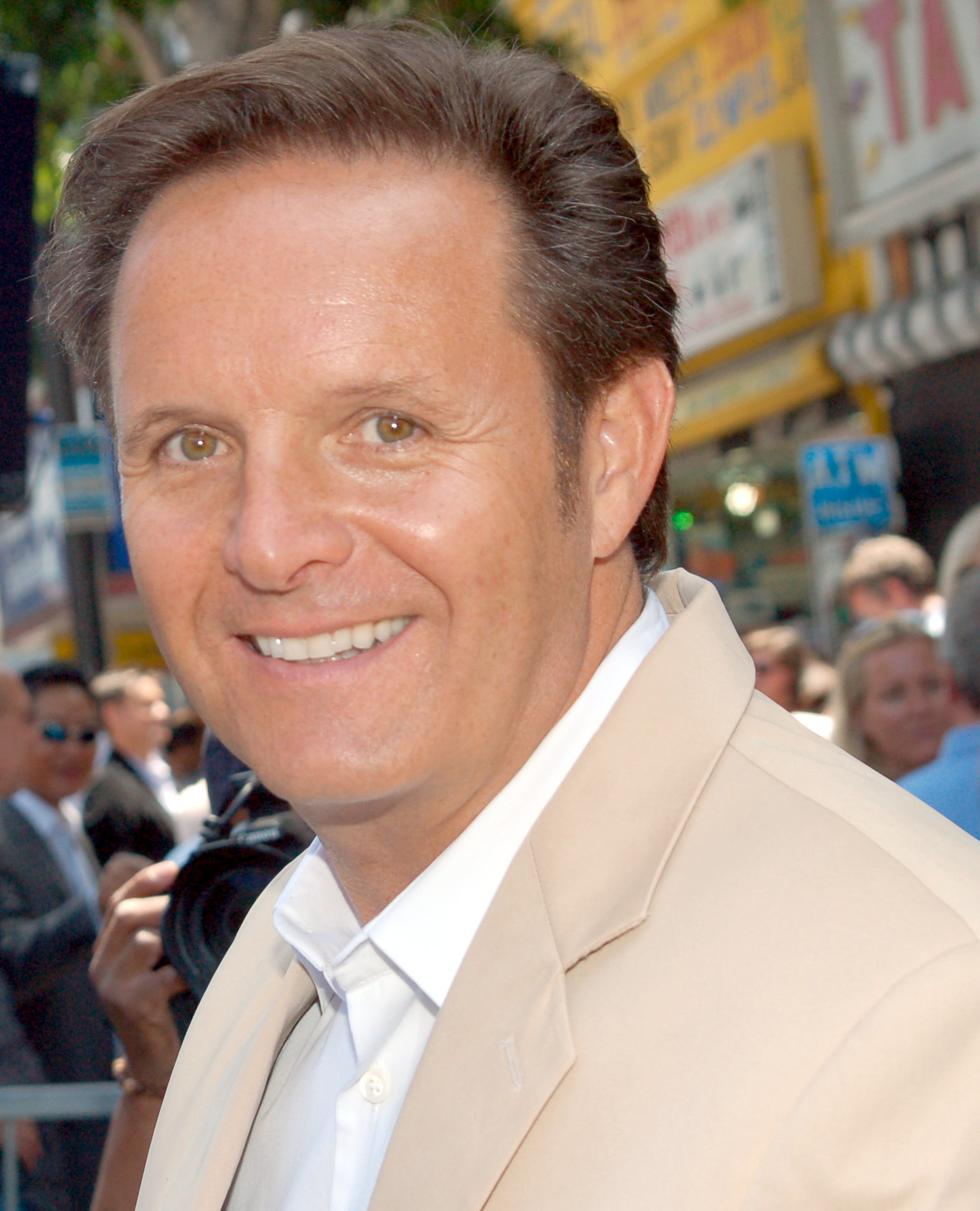
- Burnett in 2009
Awards and nominations
Award	Wins	Nominations
British Academy Film Awards	1	3
Critics' Choice Awards	10	17
Critics' Choice Real TV Awards	11	21
Emmy Awards, Daytime	1	3
Emmy Awards, Primetime	10	37
National Reality Television Awards	16	16
Nickelodeon Kids' Choice Award	2	13
People's Choice Awards	13	20
Producers Guild of America Awards	4	11
TCA Awards	1	16
Teen Choice Awards	1	9

Totals (Note: Certain award groups do not simply award one winner. They acknowledge several different recipients, have runners-up, and have third place. Since this is a specific recognition and is different from losing an award, runner-up mentions are considered wins in this award tally. For simplification and to avoid errors, each award in this list has been presumed to have had a prior nomination.)
- Wins: 86
- Nominations: 170

Mark Burnett is a British-American television producer, known for creating shows such as The Apprentice, Are You Smarter than a 5th Grader?, Shark Tank, Survivor, and The Voice. Over his career his shows have received numerous accolades including eleven Emmy Awards, ten Critics' Choice Television Awards, and thirteen People's Choice Awards.

Burnett has also received various honours including a Norman Lear Achievement Award in Television, an Anti-Defamation League Entertainment Industry Award, and a Star on the Hollywood Walk of Fame.

== Awards and nominations ==
=== As Himself ===
Year	Award	Category	Nominee	Result	Ref.
2004	Brandweek Awards	Marketer of the Year	Mark Burnett	Honored	
2004	NATPE Awards	Brandon Tartikoff Legacy Award	Mark Burnett	Honored	
2009	Hollywood Walk of Fame	Star	Mark Burnett	Honored	
2010	Producers Guild of America Awards	Norman Lear Achievement Award in Television	Mark Burnett	Honored	
2013	American Reality Television Awards	Production Company	Mark Burnett Productions	Won	
2013	TV Guide Awards	Producer of the Year	Mark Burnett	Won	
2013	World Evangelical Alliance and Entrepreneurial Leaders Organization Awards	Entrepreneurial Leader Award	Mark Burnett, Roma Downey	Honored	
2014	American Reality Television Awards	Production Company	One Three Media	Won	
2014	Anti-Defamation League	Entertainment Industry Award	Mark Burnett, Roma Downey	Honored	
2014	TCA Awards	Career Achievement Award	Mark Burnett	Nominated	
2015	American Reality Television Awards	Production Company	One Three Media	Won	
2015	GMA Dove Awards	Outstanding Mainstream Contribution to Gospel Music Award	Mark Burnett, Roma Downey	Won	

=== British Academy Television Awards (BAFTA) ===
Year	Category	Nominee	Result	Ref.
2012	Best Reality and Constructed Factual	Young Apprentice	Won	
2013	Best Reality and Constructed Factual	Young Apprentice	Nominated	
2015	Best Reality and Constructed Factual	The Apprentice UK	Nominated	

=== Critics' Choice Television Awards ===
Year	Category	Nominee	Result	Ref.
2012	Best Reality Series – Competition	The Voice	Won	
2012	Best Reality Series – Competition	Shark Tank	Nominated	
2013	Best Reality Series – Competition	The Voice	Won	
2013	Best Reality Series – Competition	Shark Tank	Nominated	
2013	Best Reality Series – Competition	Survivor	Nominated	
2014	Best Reality Series – Competition	Shark Tank	Won	
2014	Best Reality Series – Competition	Survivor	Nominated	
2014	Best Reality Series – Competition	The Voice	Nominated	
2015	Best Reality Series	Shark Tank	Won	
2015	Best Reality Series – Competition	The Voice	Nominated	
2016	Best Structured Reality Show	Shark Tank	Won	
2016	Best Reality Show – Competition	The Voice	Won	
2016	Best Reality Show – Competition	Survivor	Nominated	
2017	Best Structured Reality Show	Shark Tank	Won	
2017	Best Reality Competition Series	The Voice	Won	
2018	Best Structured Reality Show	Shark Tank	Won	
2018	Best Reality Competition Series	The Voice	Won	

=== Critics' Choice Real TV Awards ===
Year	Category	Nominee	Result	Ref.
2019	Competition Series	Survivor	Nominated	
2019	Competition Series: Talent/Variety	The Voice	Nominated	
2019	Structured Series	Shark Tank	Nominated	
2019	Business Show	Shark Tank	Won	
2019	Live Show	The Voice	Won	
2020	Competition Series	Survivor	Nominated	
2020	Competition Series: Talent/Variety	The Voice	Won	
2020	Structured Series	Shark Tank	Nominated	
2020	Business Show	Shark Tank	Won	
2021	Best Competition Series: Talent/Variety	The Voice	Won	
2021	Best Business Show	Shark Tank	Won	
2022	Best Competition Series: Talent/Variety	The Voice	Nominated	
2022	Best Business Show	Shark Tank	Won	
2023	Best Competition Series	Survivor	Nominated	
2023	Best Competition Series: Talent/Variety	The Voice	Won	
2023	Best Structured Series	Shark Tank	Nominated	
2023	Best Business Show	Shark Tank	Won	
2024	Best Competition Series	Survivor	Nominated	
2024	Best Competition Series: Talent/Variety	The Voice	Won	
2024	Best Structured Series	Shark Tank	Nominated	
2024	Best Business Show	Shark Tank	Won	

=== Emmy Awards, Daytime ===
Year	Category	Nominee	Result	Ref.
2006	Outstanding Service Show	The Martha Stewart Show	Nominated	
2007	Outstanding Lifestyle Program	The Martha Stewart Show	Nominated	
2010	Outstanding Lifestyle Show	The Martha Stewart Show	Won	

=== Emmy Awards, Primetime ===
Year	Category	Nominee	Result	Ref.
2001	Outstanding Non-Fiction Program	Survivor	Won	
2001	Outstanding Non-Fiction Program	Eco-Challenge: Borneo	Nominated	
2002	Outstanding Special Class Program	Survivor	Nominated	
2003	Outstanding Reality Competition Program	Survivor	Nominated	
2004	Outstanding Reality Competition Program	The Apprentice	Nominated	
2004	Outstanding Reality Competition Program	Survivor	Nominated	
2005	Outstanding Reality Competition Program	The Apprentice	Nominated	
2005	Outstanding Reality Competition Program	Survivor	Nominated	
2006	Outstanding Reality Competition Program	Survivor	Nominated	
2012	Outstanding Reality Program	Shark Tank	Nominated	
2012	Outstanding Reality Competition Program	The Voice	Nominated	
2013	Outstanding Miniseries Or Movie	The Bible	Nominated	
2013	Outstanding Reality Program	Shark Tank	Nominated	
2013	Outstanding Reality Competition Program	The Voice	Won	
2014	Outstanding Structured Reality Program	Shark Tank	Won	
2014	Outstanding Reality Competition Program	The Voice	Nominated	
2015	Outstanding Structured Reality Program	Shark Tank	Won	
2015	Outstanding Reality Competition Program	The Voice	Won	
2016	Outstanding Structured Reality Program	Shark Tank	Won	
2016	Outstanding Reality Competition Program	The Voice	Won	
2017	Outstanding Structured Reality Program	Shark Tank	Won	
2017	Outstanding Reality Competition Program	The Voice	Won	
2018	Outstanding Structured Reality Program	Shark Tank	Nominated	
2018	Outstanding Reality Competition Program	The Voice	Nominated	
2019	Outstanding Structured Reality Program	Shark Tank	Nominated	
2019	Outstanding Reality Competition Program	The Voice	Nominated	
2020	Outstanding Structured Reality Program	Shark Tank	Nominated	
2020	Outstanding Reality Competition Program	The Voice	Nominated	
2021	Outstanding Structured Reality Program	Shark Tank	Nominated	
2021	Outstanding Reality Competition Program	The Voice	Nominated	
2022	Outstanding Structured Reality Program	Shark Tank	Nominated	
2022	Outstanding Reality Competition Program	The Voice	Nominated	
2023	Outstanding Structured Reality Program	Shark Tank	Nominated	
2023	Outstanding Reality Competition Program	The Voice	Nominated	
2024	Outstanding Structured Reality Program	Shark Tank	Won	
2024	Outstanding Reality Competition Program	The Voice	Nominated	
2025	Outstanding Reality Competition Program	Survivor	Nominated	

=== Kids' Choice Awards ===
Year	Category	Nominee	Result	Ref.
2008	Favorite Reality Show	Are You Smarter than a 5th Grader?	Nominated	
2009	Favorite Reality Show	Are You Smarter than a 5th Grader?	Nominated	
2010	Favorite Reality Show	Are You Smarter than a 5th Grader?	Nominated	
2013	Favorite Reality Show	The Voice	Nominated	
2014	Favorite Reality Show	The Voice	Nominated	
2015	Favorite Reality Show	Shark Tank	Nominated	
2015	Favorite Talent Competition Show	The Voice	Won	
2016	Favorite Talent Competition Show	The Voice	Won	
2017	Favorite Reality Show	Shark Tank	Nominated	
2017	Favorite Reality Show	The Voice	Nominated	
2019	Favorite Reality Show	The Voice	Nominated	
2020	Favorite Reality Show	The Voice	Nominated	
2021	Favorite Reality Show	The Voice	Nominated	

=== National Reality Television Awards ===
Year	Category	Nominee	Result	Ref.
2011	Best Business Show	The Apprentice UK	Won	
2011	Best Reality Competition Show	The Apprentice UK	Won	
2012	Most Inspiring TV Show	The Apprentice UK	Won	
2013	Best Business Show	The Apprentice UK	Won	
2013	Best Reality Competition Show	The Apprentice UK	Won	
2014	Best International TV Show	Shark Tank	Won	
2015	Best Reality Competition Show	The Apprentice UK	Won	
2015	Most Inspiring TV Show	The Apprentice UK	Won	
2017	Best International TV Show	Shark Tank	Won	
2019	Best International TV Show	Shark Tank	Won	
2019	Best Business Show	The Apprentice UK	Won	
2021	Best Business Show	The Apprentice UK	Won	
2022	Best Business Show	The Apprentice UK	Won	
2023	Best Business Show	The Apprentice UK	Won	
2024	Best Reality Competition Show	The Apprentice UK	Won	
2025	Best Business Show	The Apprentice UK	Won	

=== People's Choice Awards ===
Year	Category	Nominee	Result	Ref.
2001	Favorite Reality Based Show	Survivor	Won	
2002	Favorite Reality/Game Show	Survivor	Won	
2003	Favorite Reality/Game Show	Survivor	Won	
2004	Favorite Reality Based TV Program	Survivor	Won	
2005	Favorite Reality Show Competition	The Apprentice	Nominated	
2006	Favorite Reality Show Competition	Survivor	Nominated	
2010	Favorite Competition TV Show	Survivor	Nominated	
2012	Favorite Competition TV Show	The Voice	Nominated	
2013	Favorite Competition TV Show	The Voice	Nominated	
2014	Favorite Competition TV Show	The Voice	Won	
2015	Favorite Competition TV Show	The Voice	Won	
2016	Favorite Competition TV Show	The Voice	Won	
2017	Favorite Competition TV Show	The Voice	Won	
2018	Competition Show of the Year	The Voice	Won	
2019	Competition Show of the Year	The Voice	Nominated	
2020	Competition Show of the Year	The Voice	Won	
2021	Competition Show of the Year	The Voice	Won	
2022	Competition Show of the Year	The Voice	Won	
2024	Competition Show of the Year	The Voice	Won	
2024	Competition Show of the Year	Survivor	Nominated	

=== Producers Guild of America Awards ===
Year	Category	Nominee	Result	Ref.
2015	Outstanding Producer of Non-Fiction Television	Shark Tank	Nominated	
2015	Outstanding Producer of Competition Television	The Voice	Won	
2016	Outstanding Producer of Non-Fiction Television	Shark Tank	Nominated	
2016	Outstanding Producer of Competition Television	The Voice	Won	
2017	Outstanding Producer of Competition Television	The Voice	Won	
2018	Outstanding Producer of Competition Television	The Voice	Won	
2019	Outstanding Producer of Competition Television	The Voice	Nominated	
2020	Outstanding Producer of Competition Television	The Voice	Nominated	
2021	Outstanding Producer of Competition Television	The Voice	Nominated	
2023	Outstanding Producer of Competition Television	The Voice	Nominated	
2025	Outstanding Producer of Competition Television	The Voice	Nominated	

=== TCA Awards ===
Year	Category	Nominee	Result	Ref.
2001	Outstanding New Program of the Year	Survivor	Nominated	
2004	Program of the Year	The Apprentice	Nominated	
2011	Outstanding Achievement in Reality Programming	Survivor	Nominated	
2011	Outstanding Achievement in Reality Programming	The Voice	Nominated	
2012	Outstanding Achievement in Reality Programming	The Voice	Nominated	
2013	Outstanding Achievement in Reality Programming	Shark Tank	Won	
2013	Outstanding Achievement in Reality Programming	Survivor	Nominated	
2013	Outstanding Achievement in Reality Programming	The Voice	Nominated	
2014	Outstanding Achievement in Reality Programming	Shark Tank	Nominated	
2014	Outstanding Achievement in Reality Programming	Survivor	Nominated	
2014	Outstanding Achievement in Reality Programming	The Voice	Nominated	
2015	Outstanding Achievement in Reality Programming	Shark Tank	Nominated	
2016	Outstanding Achievement in Reality Programming	Survivor	Nominated	
2017	Outstanding Achievement in Reality Programming	Shark Tank	Nominated	
2017	Outstanding Achievement in Reality Programming	Survivor	Nominated	
2025	Outstanding Achievement in Reality Programming	Survivor	Nominated	

=== Teen Choice Awards ===
Year	Category	Nominee	Result	Ref.
2001	Choice Reality TV Show	Survivor	Nominated	
2003	Choice Reality TV Show	Survivor	Nominated	
2004	Choice Reality TV Show	Survivor	Nominated	
2006	Choice Reality TV Show	Survivor	Nominated	
2015	Choice Reality TV Show	The Voice	Won	
2016	Choice Reality TV Show	The Voice	Nominated	
2017	Choice Reality TV Show	The Voice	Won	
2018	Choice Reality TV Show	The Voice	Nominated	
2019	Choice Reality TV Show	The Voice	Nominated	

=== Other ===
Year	Award	Category	Nominee	Result	Ref.
2005	FRAPA Format Awards	Best Reality Format	The Apprentice	Won	
2005	Royal Television Society Programme Awards	International	The Apprentice	Nominated	
2006	Rose d'Or	Best Reality Show	The Apprentice UK	Won	
2007	Royal Television Society Programme Awards	Features and Factual Entertainment	The Apprentice UK	Won	
2007	Sports Emmy Awards	Outstanding Edited Sports Series	The Contender	Nominated	
2009	Broadcasting Press Guild	Best Factual Entertainment	The Apprentice UK	Won	
2013	American Reality Television Awards	Overall Show	The Voice	Won	
2014	Audie Award	Award for Faith-Based Fiction and Nonfiction	A Story of God and All of Us	Won	
2017	MTV Movie & TV Awards	Best Reality Competition	The Voice	Nominated	
