= Toughest Cowboy =

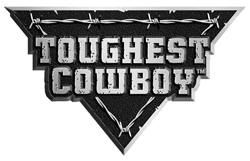
- Created by: Jac Sperling; Tommy Joe Lucia
- Country of origin: United States
- No. of seasons: 3
- No. of episodes: 27

Production
- Executive producers: Jac Sperling; Tommy Joe Lucia; Mark Burnett
- Running time: 42 minutes

Original release
- Network: Fox Sports Network (FSN); Spike TV
- Release: April 8, 2007 – April 30, 2009

Toughest Cowboy is an American rodeo competition-based reality television program broadcast between 2007 and 2009. It aired for the first two seasons on Fox Sports, with its third season on Spike TV. The series originally followed more of a sports competition format, but added back stories about the professional cowboys featured during its final season produced by Mark Burnett.

The series followed twelve professional cowboys as they competed in the three professional roughstock rodeo events — bareback bronc riding, saddle bronc riding and bull riding in effort to win the Toughest Cowboy championship and the grand prize of a ranch in the American West. Originally created by Jac Sperling and Tommy Joe Lucia, Toughest Cowboy was a combination of athletic competition and personal retrospectives creating a new genre of television, known as "sports drama". The first broadcast aired April 8, 2007, on the Fox Sport Network (FSN). In 2009, Mark Burnett signed on to produce the series for Spike TV. Whiskey Falls composed the theme song.

== Format and rules ==
The show followed a group of twelve professional rodeo cowboys through a series of live rodeo tournaments in which they rode in three different disciplines, whereas in most rodeo competitions, contestants compete in one specific discipline or event. This all-around competition added a significantly higher likelihood of injury. Each week a competitor was eliminated from the competition, until the final four competitors remained. These four final cowboys rode a total of six animals each (two bareback broncs, two saddle broncs and two bulls) during the championship tournament. Throughout the championship round, each competitor amassed total ride points, and the cowboy with the most total points at the conclusion of the finals was awarded the series championship and grand prize ranch.

Toughest Cowboy also used a modified point system based on the standard 8-second qualified ride from traditional rodeo. Rather than scoring a "0" for any ride shorted than eight seconds, Toughest Cowboy competitors were delivered penalty points for the 1/10 of seconds they were short of the full ride mark. Each 1/10 of a second was equal to 1 point. This eliminated the chance of a 0-0 tie between competitors.

In addition to the athletic competition, the broadcast included segments outside of the rodeo arena. These segments gave background on the competitors' lives, most of which included visits to their homes. There were also interviews conducted during the live competition to provide an inside look at the cowboys' thoughts during the tournament.

The first season (2007) of Toughest Cowboy included eight competitors who competed in match play for total wins. The total wins dictated who progressed to the championship round. The second season (2008) followed the same general format but included 12 competitors. In the third season (2009), the show changed the format to a total points competition and introduced a new twist to the core rules to keep the show engaging throughout the season. This addition was dubbed the "Knockout Round", in which the two cowboys with the lowest scores for the tournament had to compete head-to-head in a final bull ride. The loser of the head-to-head competition was then eliminated from the show. The winner of the Tournament was also granted immunity from the Knockout Round the next Tournament.

== Toughest Cowboy seasons ==
Season 1 – The inaugural season of Toughest Cowboy marked the first time an all-around roughstock rodeo competition was produced for television. The broadcast contained both rodeo action and retrospectives of the competitors. The show aired on Sundays on Fox Sport Net (FSN) and was hosted by Charissa Thompson. Play-by-play announcer, Clay Matvick, and 8-time World Champion bull rider Donnie Gay provided commentary during the tournaments. The four cowboys to make it to the finals were Trey Broussard, Bandy Murphy, Nelson Tsosie and Erik Wolford. After two rounds (six rides) of competition, Bandy Murphy stood as the first Toughest Cowboy Champion.

Season 2 – The second season moved to a midnight Saturday time slot with encore appearances during primetime on Fox Sport Net (FSN). The season began with an in-depth look at Toughest Cowboy tryouts filmed at the Resistol Arena in Mesquite, Texas. It was also the first year the show awarded a ranch as a grand prize. Added to the on-air talent were Cowboy Coaches. Rodeo legends, Monty "Hawkeye" Henson and Sandy Kirby provided pointers and assistance to the cowboys as they competed throughout the season. The show was again hosted by Charissa Thompson, with Clay Matvick and Donnie Gay providing play-by-play commentary. The four cowboys to make it to the finals were Trey Broussard, Chad Eubank, Shane Proctor and Erik Wolford. After two rounds of competition, Shane Proctor claimed the championship title and the first-ever grand prize ranch.

Season 3 – The third season saw the most changes to the show. The addition of Mark Burnett as Executive Producer, as well as a new broadcast network - Spike TV. Toughest Cowboy premiered on Spike TV, Thursday, January 29, 2009, following TNA IMPACT!. The show again began its season with the tryout episode. Now hosted by Brandi Williams, the show took on an edgier presentation to fit the Spike TV audience. Gone were the play-by-play announcers, as the show strived to get the reactions directly from the competitors rather than third party analysts. Cowboy Coaches remained as part of the on-air talent as former rodeo champions Pete Hawkins and Cody Snyder filled the roles. Mid-season Spike TV moved the show to Wednesday night following its flagship program, UFC. The four cowboys to make it to the finals were Charlie Barker, Chad Eubank, Bandy Murphy and Steve Woolsey. After the six ride, total points tournament, Bandy Murphy captured his second Toughest Cowboy title and the grand prize ranch.
