= Our Little Genius =

- Our Little Genius logo.
- Created by: Mark Burnett
- Directed by: Don Weiner
- Presented by: Kevin Pollak
- Country of origin: United States
- No. of seasons: 1
- No. of episodes: 8 (all unaired)

Production
- Executive producers: Mark Burnett; Barry Poznick; John Stevens
- Production location: Los Angeles Center Studios
- Running time: 60 minutes
- Production companies: Mark Burnett Productions; Zoo Productions

Original release
- Network: Fox
- Release: January 13, 2010

Our Little Genius is an unaired game show that was created by Mark Burnett, and was originally scheduled to premiere January 13, 2010, on Fox. Hosted by Kevin Pollak, the series was to feature children answering questions on expert subjects to win money for their families, with their parents able to ask experts for advice.

A week ahead of its scheduled premiere, Fox pulled Our Little Genius from its schedule, with Burnett stating that he had concerns over the integrity of the program, as contestants had received more information than they should have. A complaint to the Federal Communications Commission (FCC) the following month, as well as accounts in 2021 by a former contestant, suggested that the producers of Our Little Genius had provided contestants with information regarding specific questions they were being asked during their game, and were allowing contestants who lost on the early levels of the game to try again from the beginning with new questions.

The show would be shelved indefinitely and never made it to air.

== Gameplay ==
Child prodigies aged between 6 and 12 years old were asked increasingly difficult questions within subjects of their expertise, with correct answers rewarding money for the child's family. Based on the difficulty of the next question, the parents and a panel of experts determined whether they would move on, or walk away with their current winnings.

The child faced a maximum of 10 multi-part, open-ended questions. The category for each question was shown beforehand for the child's parents, not the child, to make a decision on whether to continue playing or not. Each question must have been fully answered correctly to advance the child toward the grand prize of $500,000. The money ladder went as follows:

Correct answers	Money won
10	$500,000
9	$350,000
8	$250,000
7	$175,000
6	$100,000
5	$50,000
4	$25,000
3	$10,000 (safety net)
2	$5,000
1	$1,000

Questions given were at different levels of higher education: “College”, “Masters”, and “Doctorate”.

The parents were situated directly across the child, and directly adjacent to a panel of three experts. The parents had the right to stop the game before any question, to take the accumulated winnings, as well as two helps:

- Preview the question themselves; and
- Have the experts preview the question and advise the parents on its difficulty.

== Cancellation ==
On January 7, 2010, one week before its scheduled premiere, the show's creator, Mark Burnett, announced that he had asked Fox to postpone the premiere of Our Little Genius due to concerns about its integrity. Burnett said that issues with how information was relayed to contestants were serious enough that he felt compelled to reshoot the episodes. Fox supported Burnett's decision, and added that all contestants would keep their winnings. The previously scheduled American Idol (which had been extended to 75 minutes, with the premiere of Our Little Genius airing for 45 minutes after it) was extended to 90 minutes, and a rerun of The Simpsons episode "Once Upon a Time in Springfield" filled the rest of the hour.

The Los Angeles Times reported that Burnett's main concern was that contestants somehow got more information than they should have prior to taping. An audience report to the website BuzzerBlog suggested that the show had also stopped tape to replace a category that a contestant was not confident with, with a stage manager claiming that there had been a technical error. On February 20, 2010, it was reported that the Federal Communications Commission (FCC) had recently begun an inquiry into Our Little Genius, based on complaints alleging that the contestants were being coached prior to filming on topics (such as in one case, on the British terms for four specific musical note values they "needed to know"), and that their parents were being given influence over questions.

In 2021, The Arizona Republic published accounts from one former contestant, Benjamin Mohler— who was answering questions on paleontology. Prior to filming, his father was asked by one of the producers without context to ensure that Benjamin knew about "Harry Seeley" and "1888"—the author and year of publication of the research paper which divided dinosaurs into two clades. Although his father initially suspected that these may have been relating to one of the panelists, they ended up being the answers for one of the questions in the game.

When Mohler answered incorrectly during a question on the four dinosaurs larger than Tyrannosaurus rex, taping abruptly stopped, and the stage went dark, with the host Pollak believing that it had been a power outage. Mohler stated that in the green room, he was informed that contestants were being guaranteed to win at least $10,000, and that they would reshoot the show. When he returned to the stage, Mohler replayed the game with new questions, but lost on the third question after incorrectly guessing the taxonomy of Smilodon (Felidae).

While this would have been one of the first instances of the FCC having to investigate irregularities in a televised game show since the 1950s quiz show scandals, it was questioned by TheWrap whether the FCC even had jurisdiction, since the offending program did not actually make it to air. In 2016, a Freedom of Information Request was made to the FCC by Dirty Feed. The FCC confirmed that no action was taken, and there were no records of an investigation. In 2021, The Arizona Republic found no such record that an inquiry into Our Little Genius was ever performed, likely due to Fox's decision to pull the program, and as of now, Fox still has no plans to ever air the series at all.

A 2019 article in the Chapman Law Review revealed that a parent belonging to one contestant was responsible for reporting the show to the FCC after receiving likely answers to questions from producers. The father wrote to the FCC that the producer "told us that it was very important to know that the hemidemisemiquaver is the British name for the sixty-fourth note. He also placed specific emphasis on knowing the time signature of the polka." When the parent raised concerns about this to members of the production staff, he was eventually told that they were going to postpone his child's taping, and then he was told his child's involvement was being canceled, prompting the parent to report the show to the FCC. According to the article, the FCC initiated an investigation, sending subpoenas and interrogatories to the production regarding the contestant's father's claims. After the subpoenas and interrogatories were sent, Fox announced the show was not going to air, contestants could keep their prize money, and the FCC abandoned its investigation.

== See also ==
- List of television series canceled before airing an episode
