= Coupled =

2016 American reality TV series

- Genre: dating game show
- Created by: Mark Burnett; Ben Newmark; Dan Newmark; Larry Barron
- Presented by: Terrence J
- Starring: See below
- Country of origin: United States
- Original language: English
- No. of seasons: 1
- No. of episodes: 11

Production
- Executive producers: Mark Burnett; Tom Shelly; Ben Newmark; Dan Newmark; Larry Barron
- Production location: Anguilla
- Running time: 43 minutes
- Production companies: MGM Television; Grandma's House Entertainment

Original release
- Network: Fox
- Release: May 17 – August 2, 2016

Coupled is an American dating game show that aired on Fox from May 17 to August 2, 2016. It was hosted by television personality, Terrence J and created by Mark Burnett, of Survivor, The Apprentice, Are You Smarter than a 5th Grader?, Shark Tank, and The Voice, as well as Ben Newmark, Dan Newmark and Larry Barron.

Filming took place in Anguilla. The cast included Miss Arizona USA 2009, Alicia-Monique Blanco; Miss Colorado USA 2015, Talyah Polee; host, Domonique Price, and American singer-songwriter, TV personality, and former collegiate athlete; Alex Lagemann.

Tyler Gattuso was in the running to be a cast member on Big Brother 17, but was ultimately not chosen due to the news being leaked by online media and his Instagram hinting at the news suggesting he wasn't going to be active for quite a while. A few days later, after the cast for Big Brother was announced, he was ranting on Twitter, shortly deleting them and deactivating his account.

On August 8, 2016, Fox canceled the series after one season.

== Premise ==
Coupled features 12 single women who are on the quest for love. Each week different men come to the Caribbean Island and meet the women. After meeting, the women have the choice to go right — saying yes to pursuing the man some more — and join him at the Tiki bar. Alternately, they can choose to go left — saying no to spending any more time with the man — and go back to the bungalow to wait for the next contestant. This process is inspired by the app, Tinder, in which you swipe left or right depending on your preference.

The women who choose to go to the tiki bar will await the man, where he will then pick two women to pursue further at the villa. Once at the villa, the man will spend some individual time with each of the women to see which one he has the most chemistry or connections with. At the end of the night, he will select one of the women to stay with him at the villa becoming Coupled and the other one will go back to the bungalow to await the next guy.

At the end of their six-week stay on Anguilla, the couples will be faced with the decision to continue their relationship back in the United States or to end it. The women who want to continue the relationship will join their partner waiting for them at a helicopter pad, while the women who do not want to continue the relationship will not join the men.

During the show, the contestants are given cell phones which they can use to interact with each other. Some of the text messages are featured on the show to create a dialogue and convey more drama.

== Contestants ==
Women					Men			
Name	Age	Hometown	Occupation		Name	Age	Hometown	Occupation
Coupled
Lindsey Tuer	30	Carlsbad, CA	Sales Rep	↔	Alex Lagemann	26	Hermosa Beach, CA	Musician
Ashley Reitz	27	Marco Island, FL	Curve Model	↔	Brian "BT" Urruela	30	Tampa, FL	Romance Novelist
Lisa Rotondi	26	New York, NY	Real Estate Agent	↔	Ben Rosenfield	36	Chicago, IL	Tech Entrepreneur
Terecia "TT" Baker	26	Alhambra, CA	Theme Park Princess	↔	Brandon Smith	29	Los Angeles, CA	Former Basketball Pro
Alexandra "Alex" Clark	23	Louisville, KY	Radio Personality	↔	Jeffrey Blockson	30	Chicago, IL	Real Estate Investor
Alicia Blanco	29	Toluca Lake, CA	Executive Assistant	↔	Tyler Gattuso	24	Miami, FL	Model
Not Coupled
Domonique Price	29	Seattle, WA	Attorney		Imari Dale	29	Los Angeles, CA	Digital Ad Executive
Kristin Kirgan	33	Los Angeles, CA	Photographer		Steven "Stevey" Moran	26	Los Angeles, CA	Interior Designer
Alyssa Reevess	32	Sherman Oaks, CA	Model		Javier Finlay	34	Miami, FL	Lawyer
Brittany Lo	24	New York, NY	Beauty Company CEO		Taylor Hart	36	Los Angeles, CA	Entrepreneur
Talyah Polee	27	Lakewood, CO	Substance Abuse Counselor					
Michelle Tam	28	New York, NY	Interior Decorator					
Note: The arrow (↔) means the pair is COUPLED.

Couples that Stayed Together: - Lindsay and Alex - TT and Brandon - Lisa and Ben

Couples that Broke Up: - Alex and Jeffrey - Alicia and Tyler - Ashley and BT

== Contestant Progress ==
Episode	1		2	3	4		5		6		7	8		9	10/11
Men	Alex	Imari	BT	Taylor	Ben	Brandon	Stevey	Jeffrey	Javier	Ben	Tyler	Jeffrey	No more men.		
Women	8/12	7/11	6/10	3/9	4/9	4/7	0/7	5/7	6/6	-	6/6	-	No more men.		
"Alex"	NO	NO	YES	NO	VILLA	(Note: The woman did not get to meet this man because she was in the VILLA awaiting a decision by another.)	NO	YES	VILLA (Note: The man didn't choose either women and left the island)	(Note: A woman in the villa switched partners and there was no decision from the other woman.)	VILLA	SWITCH			NC
Alicia	YES	VILLA	NO	NO	NO	VILLA	NO	NO	YES	(Note: A woman in the villa switched partners and there was no decision from the other woman.)	VILLA				NC
"TT"	YES	YES	YES	NO	NO	VILLA				(Note: A woman in the villa switched partners and there was no decision from the other woman.)					COUPLED
Lisa	YES	NO	YES	VILLA						SWITCH					COUPLED
Ashley	YES	NO	VILLA												NC
Lindsey	VILLA														COUPLED
Alyssa	YES	YES	NO	NO	YES	NO	NO	YES	VILLA		YES		LEFT	(Note: This woman is no longer on the island)	
Brittany	VILLA	NO	NO	NO	NO	NO	NO	NO	YES		YES		LEFT	(Note: This woman is no longer on the island)	
Domonique	NO	VILLA			NO	YES	NO	YES	YES		YES		LEFT	(Note: This woman is no longer on the island)	
Talyah	NO	YES	NO	NO	NO	YES	NO	VILLA	YES		YES		LEFT	(Note: This woman is no longer on the island)	
Kristin	NO	YES	VILLA	YES	YES	NO	NO	VILLA				LEFT			
Michelle	YES	YES	YES	VILLA	VILLA					LEFT					

NO The woman chose to go left back to the Bungalows to await the next man.
YES The woman chose to go right to the Tiki Bar to await the man.
VILLA The woman was selected by the man to go to the VILLA, but was not chosen to stay.
VILLA The woman was selected by the man to stay at the VILLA with him.
SWITCH The woman decided to SWITCH to a different man at the VILLA.
LEFT The woman LEFT the island and went home.
LEFT The woman LEFT the island and went home because no more men were coming.
NC The woman and/or man decided to be Not Coupled when they left the island.
COUPLED The woman and man decided to stay COUPLED when they left the island.

== Episodes ==
No.	Title	Original release date	U.S. viewers (millions)
1	"Chemistry 101"	May 17, 2016	1.76
In the series premiere, 12 women begin their search for love by meeting face-to-face with a series of men and instantly deciding if they have enough chemistry to begin dating.
2	"Instant Connection"	May 24, 2016	1.22
The second man arrives and decides which ladies he wants to spend time with and the first couple tests their chemistry in the Couples' Villas.
3	"Chemical Attraction"	May 31, 2016	1.29
A text message sparks tension in one of the couples and a new single guy arrives.
4	"At First Sight"	June 7, 2016	1.31
Political views cause tension for one couple and two new guys arrive.
5	"Love Bites"	June 14, 2016	1.23
A surprising rejection creates chaos among the ladies; a woman eyes someone else's man; and one of the ladies reveals an emotional part of her past.
6	"Chain Reactions"	June 21, 2016	1.26
Competition increases amongst the women when a new guy receives a very warm welcome. Also: one couple runs into compatibility problems while one of the other women tries to see how much her guy is invested.
7	"Chemistry Project"	June 28, 2016	1.39
A new guy chooses two completely different women to take to the villas and they do everything they can to win him over. Elsewhere: a game of truth or dare tests a couple's relationship.
8	"Mutual Distraction"	July 19, 2016	1.28
9	"Laws of Attraction"	July 26, 2016	1.06
10–11	"Coupled Up"	August 2, 2016	1.11
