= Mark Burnett =

British television and film producer and author

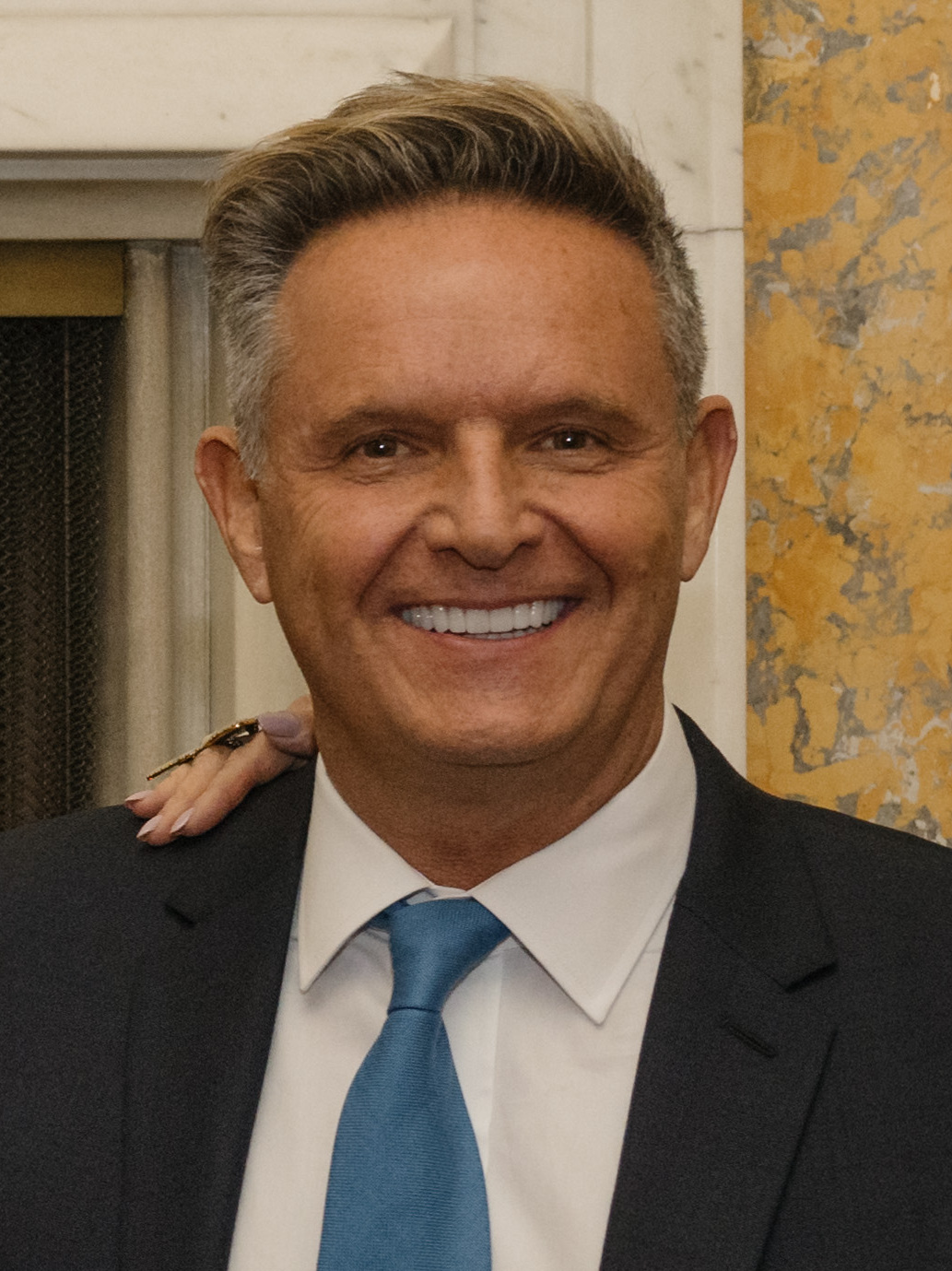
- Burnett in 2025
- Born: James Mark Burnett; 17 July 1960 (age 66); London, England
- Citizenship: United Kingdom; United States
- Occupation: Television producer
- Years active: 1995–present
- Organizations: United Artists Television; MGM
- Notable work: Survivor; The Apprentice; Shark Tank; The Voice
- Spouses: Kym Gold (m. 1988; div. 1989) Dianne Minerva (m. 1992; div. 2006) Roma Downey (m. 2007)
- Children: 2
- Awards: Full list

United States Special Envoy for the United Kingdom
- Incumbent
- Assumed office 20 January 2025
- President: Donald Trump
- Preceded by: Position established

James Mark Burnett (born 17 July 1960) is a British-American television producer, best known for creating The Apprentice, and producing Survivor, Are You Smarter than a 5th Grader?, Shark Tank, and The Voice. He has produced more than 4000 hours worth of television programming, which have appeared on over 15 major television networks and aired in over 70 countries.

In 1995, Burnett developed his first production company, Mark Burnett Productions, which focused on reality television. In 2009, he founded Lightworkers Media with Roma Downey, which focuses on Christian media. He served as president of United Artists Media Group from 2014 to 2018, and chairman of MGM Worldwide Television Group from 2018 to 2022.

Burnett has received numerous awards including 10 Primetime Emmy Awards and a Hollywood Walk of Fame Star.

In December 2024, President-elect Donald Trump announced he would appoint Burnett as the United States Special Envoy to the United Kingdom.

== Early life ==
James Mark Burnett was born on 17 July 1960 in London, England. He is the only son of Archie Burnett and Jean Nicol Burnett (née Scott). Both originally from Glasgow, Burnett's parents moved to Dagenham where Archie was employed as a Ford Motor factory worker and boxing coach, while Jean worked at a battery compound. Burnett's father is Roman Catholic while his mother was Presbyterian. His mother died in 1993.

Burnett grew up in boroughs of East London and attended an Anglican parochial primary school. He undertook secondary schooling at The Warren School and later enrolled at Redbridge Technical College in Ilford. In 1978, he dropped out before finishing his degree to enlist in the British Army. Burnett volunteered for the 3rd Battalion, Parachute Regiment for five years, serving in Northern Ireland and the Falkland Islands.

== Early career ==
In October 1982, Burnett immigrated to the United States, where his friend Nick Hill, who had emigrated from the UK earlier, was working as a nanny and chauffeur. Hill knew of an open position for a live-in nanny with the Jaeger family in affluent Beverly Hills. Despite having no experience as a nanny, Burnett went on the interview. The Jaegers, realizing the advantage of having a nanny and security at the same time, hired him. After a year of working for the Jaegers, he moved on to another family in Malibu, California, taking care of two boys for $250 a week. He was eventually given a position in the insurance office owned by the boys' father. Two years later, Burnett rented a portion of a fence at Venice Beach in Los Angeles, and sold T-shirts for $18 each during weekends. Realizing he made more money selling T-shirts, he left his insurance job.

In 1991, Burnett and four others joined a French adventure competition, the Raid Gauloises. Afterward, Burnett saw a business opportunity in holding similar competitions. He purchased the format rights and brought a similar competition, Eco-Challenge, to America. Eco-Challenge launched Burnett's career as a television producer.

== Productions ==
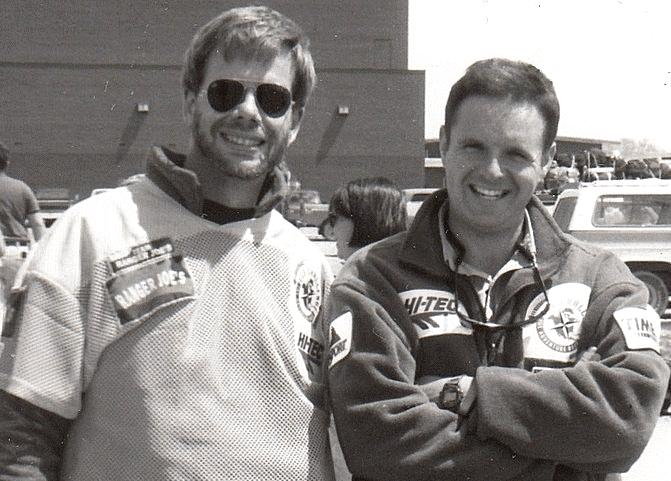
Mark Burnett (right) during Eco-Challenge Utah in 1995

Burnett first produced the expedition race show Eco-Challenge in 1995. This led to the hit reality show Survivor which premiered in the summer of 2000, and was the most watched summer series since Sonny & Cher. Survivor was named the Number 1 reality series of all time by Entertainment Weekly in 2009.

In 2004, NBC premiered The Apprentice, a reality television series in which contestants competed for a job under Donald Trump.

Burnett has produced several other television franchises including Are You Smarter than a 5th Grader?, Shark Tank, The Voice, Beat Shazam, Coupled, and TKO: Total Knock Out.

Past shows include The Celebrity Apprentice (NBC), Bully Beatdown, Combat Missions, The Contender, The Contender Asia, Expedition Africa, Expedition Impossible, How'd You Get So Rich?, Martha Stewart, My Dad Is Better than Your Dad, On the Lot (a collaboration with Steven Spielberg), Pirate Master, The Restaurant, Rock Star, Sarah Palin's Alaska, Stars Earn Stripes, Starmaker, Toughest Cowboy and Wedding Day.

Burnett and his wife, actress Roma Downey, produced The Bible, a ten-hour History Channel drama based upon stories of the Bible. The Bible became the No. 1 new series on cable TV in 2013 and was the No. 1 series in Canada, Spain and Portugal. In total, with subsequent airings, The Bible was seen by more than 100 million viewers.

After the success of The Bible, Burnett and Downey started developing more faith-based scripted series. A.D. The Bible Continues premiered on NBC on Easter Sunday 2015, and The Dovekeepers miniseries aired on CBS in 2015.

In September 2014, MGM acquired a 55 percent interest in One Three Media and LightWorkers Media. The two companies were consolidated into a new film and television company, United Artists Media Group, which was then acquired fully by MGM in 2015.

In December 2015, Burnett was named president of MGM Television and Digital Group, signing a five-year deal. Burnett's appointment was set up to occur simultaneously with the closing of MGM's acquisition of the remaining 45 percent of Hearst's, Burnett's and Roma Downey's interests in United Artists Media Group (UAMG), which would be absorbed under the MGM Television Group umbrella. MGM Television would now have numerous unscripted and scripted television shows airing on network and cable or in production, including: The Voice (NBC); Survivor (CBS); Shark Tank (ABC); Beyond the Tank (ABC); Celebrity Apprentice (NBC); Fargo (FX); Vikings (HISTORY); Teen Wolf (MTV); 500 Questions (ABC); The People's Choice Awards (CBS); LIGHT TV, Lucha Underground (El Rey Network) and America's Greatest Makers (INTEL/Turner). In June 2018, MGM appointed Burnett as Chairman of MGM Worldwide Television.

In 2017, Burnett had timeslot winning shows on six nights out of seven. As Chairman of MGM Worldwide Television, he oversaw scripted television shows including, Fargo (FX), The Handmaid's Tale (Hulu), Vikings and Vikings: Valhalla (Netflix).

As of 2024, Burnett is the executive producer of five network television shows: Generation Gap (ABC), Beat Shazam (FOX), Shark Tank (ABC), Survivor (CBS) and The Voice (NBC). Burnett is also the executive producer of the cable series Lucha Underground (The El Rey Network) and The Contender (EPIX).

== Personal life ==
=== Relationships and family ===
Shortly after moving to California, Burnett met Kym Gold through his t-shirt selling business, as Gold owned a wholesale apparel store. After Burnett took a six week course on Judaism, they married in 1988 at the house of Gold's parents in Malibu. The wedding was officiated by a rabbi. They divorced a year later, shortly after Burnett received his green card.

In 1989, Burnett met actress and talent agent Dianne Minerva while both were working at the talent agency of Gold's father. The two married on 29 June 1992 in Hanalei Bay. They have two sons together, James (born 20 August 1993) and Cameron (born 26 April 1996). The couple separated in 2003 and divorced in 2006. According to Minerva, she found out that Burnett intended to file for divorce after hearing him call their marriage a "failure" and himself "single" on The Howard Stern Show.

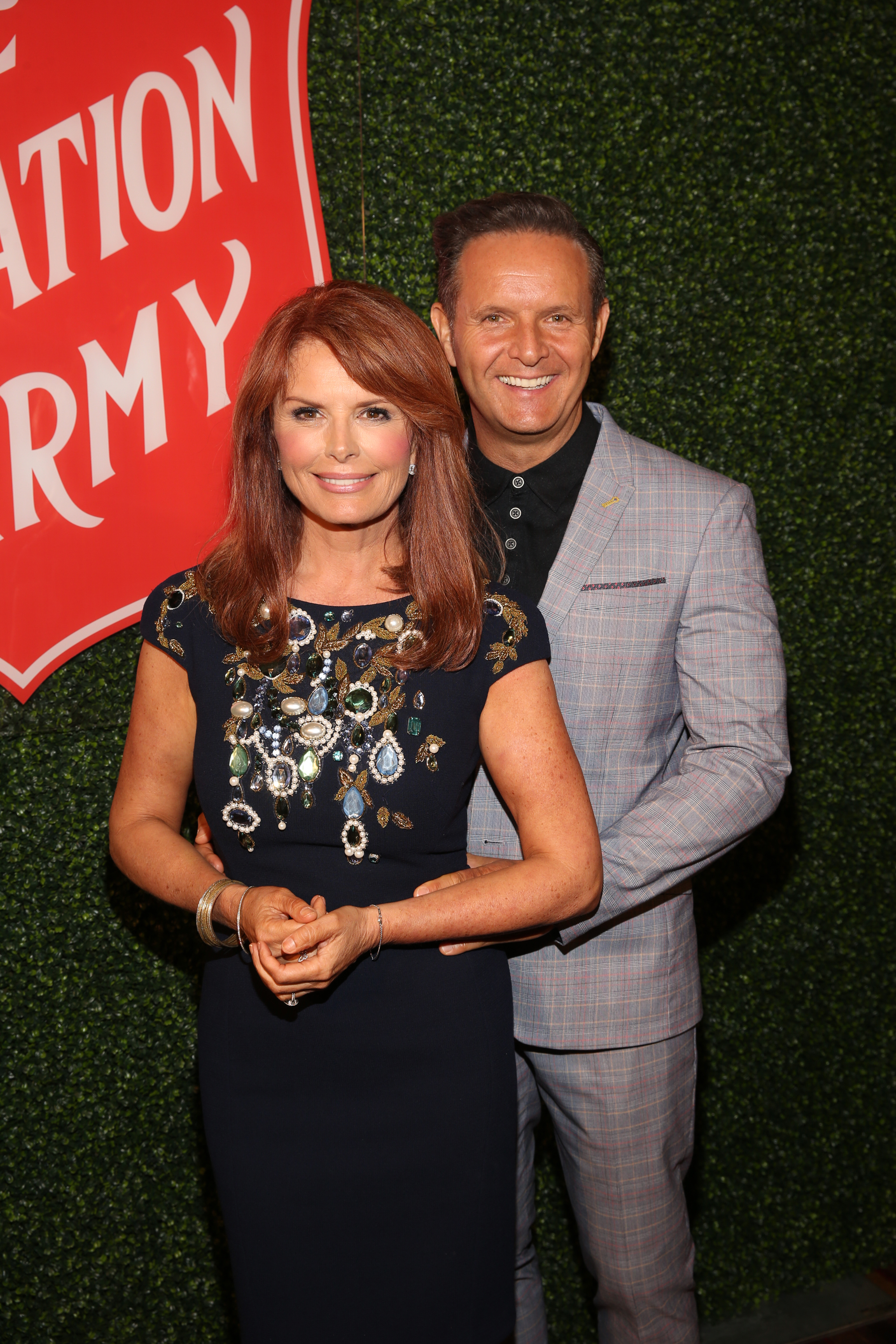
Downey and Burnett at the 2015 Salvation Army Sally Awards

In January 2004, Burnett began dating Roma Downey after meeting in a salon. In November 2006, Burnett proposed while vacationing with their children in Zihuatanejo, Mexico. The couple wed on 28 April 2007 in their Malibu home. The ceremony was officiated by Downey's former co-star, Della Reese.

In 2014, Burnett's son Cameron received brain surgery to remove a neuroendocrine tumor.

=== Philanthropy ===
Burnett has supported various charitable organizations including Operation Smile, the Elizabeth Glaser Pediatric AIDS Foundation,and the Malibu Foundation (which provides wildfire relief). Together with Downey, Burnett has been involved with numerous Christian organizations, such as Compassion International. In 2014, the two established the Cradle of Christianity Fund which seeks to aid Christian refugees and support pluralism in the Middle East.

=== Religion ===
Burnett grew up in a joint Catholic and Presbyterian household and received an Anglican education. He explored converting to Judaism during his first marriage, and attended Catholic services during his second marriage. During an interview with Esquire in 2001, Burnett described religion as a "waste of time." Burnett became more dedicated to his faith after meeting Downey, with the two calling themselves the “noisiest Christians in Hollywood.” Since 2014, Burnett has described himself as a non-denominational Christian. He has stated that he does not attend one specific church, but that he and Downey attend many different churches of different denominations across the U.S.

=== Political views and affiliations ===
Due to his close personal relationship with Trump, there has been significant media speculation about Burnett's political views and affiliation. In 2001, Burnett described himself as "apolitical" and reiterated this in 2016. In 2008, Burnett donated the maximum contribution to Barack Obama's campaign and $30,400 to the Democratic National Committee. In 2013, he donated more than $5000 to Democratic Secretary of State of Kentucky Alison Lundergan Grimes. As of 2025, he has made no known donations to any Republican candidates.

Following the 2016 United States presidential election, Burnett disavowed Trump's campaign stating,

"Given all of the false media reports, I feel compelled to clarify a few points. I am not now and have never been a supporter of Donald Trump’s candidacy. I am NOT “Pro-Trump" ... Further, my wife and I reject the hatred, division and misogyny that has been a very unfortunate part of his campaign."

Both Tom Barrack, chairman of Trump's 2016 inauguration committee, and Stephanie Winston Wolkoff, senior advisor to Melania Trump, stated that Burnett helped produce the inauguration. Burnett denies these claims.

==== United States Special Envoy to the United Kingdom ====
In December 2024, Trump announced that Burnett was going to serve as the first United States Special Envoy to the UK. The position is separate from the U.S. ambassadorial post and was intended to focus on strengthening U.S.–UK relations, particularly in trade, investment and cultural exchanges. Burnett officially assumed the position on 20 January 2025.

== Controversies ==
=== Competition interference ===
Burnett has been accused across multiple shows of interfering with results and compromising the shows' integrity. During Eco-Challenge, Burnett was accused of setting more hurdles than player were made aware of prior to starting the race and admitted to waiving the $12,500 entrance fee for specific teams.

In 2001, Survivor contestant Stacy Stillman sued CBS, claiming that Burnett had interfered in the show's results. According to the lawsuit, two cast members originally planned on voting out fellow contestant Rudy Boesch, but Burnett stepped in and convinced them to vote out Stillman. This, alleged Stillman, was because Burnett viewed Boesch as a potential fan favourite and feared that losing the oldest cast member would alienate an older viewing audience. The lawsuit was eventually settled out of court.

In 2010, the Federal Communications Commission investigated Burnett's show Our Little Genius after receiving a complaint about producer interference. The show was subsequently cancelled before airing.

=== Trump tapes and Emmys altercation ===
In the years following the 2016 presidential election, several former producers and contestants on The Apprentice accused Trump of making derogatory statements, using racial slurs, and sexually harassing contestants while on set. In 2016, several media outlets alleged Burnett owned and was withholding tapes from The Apprentice that showcased this behaviour. Burnett responded stating that he did not have the access or rights to release archival footage from the show, as it was owned by MGM and subject to "existing contractual obligations." In 2018, actor Tom Arnold released a series in collaboration with Viceland that sought to find disparaging recordings of Trump. In episode two of The Hunt for the Trump Tapes, Arnold reiterated the allegations that Burnett personally held unreleased Apprentice footage featuring inappropriate behaviour. While promoting the show, Arnold stated that he planned to confront Burnett about the footage at that year's Emmy Awards ceremony. At a pre-Emmys party on 16 September, Burnett and Arnold got into a physical altercation. Arnold later filled out a battery report with the Los Angeles Police Department but no charges were filed against either party.

== Awards, honors, and affiliations ==
In 2004, Time called Burnett one of the Most Influential People in the World Today. Burnett was also named "Philanthropist of the Year" by the Reality Cares Foundation. He has won both Brandweek's "Marketer of the Year Award", the prestigious Rose d'Or Frapa Format Award, the Brandon Tartikoff Legacy Award and the Norman Lear Award from the Producers Guild of America.

Burnett served for two years on the board of directors for the British Academy of Film and Television Arts. In November 2007, Burnett was elected into the Broadcast & Cable Hall of Fame and in 2008, it was announced that he would be honoured with a star on the Hollywood Walk of Fame. On 8 July 2009, Burnett received a star at 6664 Hollywood Blvd. In June 2011, Burnett was elected into the Producers Guild of America Council Board of Delegates and currently serves on the Producers Council. He is an ambassador for Operation Smile.

In 2013, the ten-hour mini-series The Bible received the Parents Television Council 2013 Seal of Approval. Shark Tank, The Voice and Survivor were all nominated for Critics Choice Awards, at which The Voice won for Best Reality Series – Competition. The three shows were nominated for the Television Critics Association Awards, at which Shark Tank won for Outstanding Achievement in Reality Programming.

In 2013, The Voice, Shark Tank, and The Bible were nominated for Primetime Emmy Awards; The Voice won for Outstanding Reality – Competition Program. The Voice and Shark Tank were nominated at the 2015 Critics' Choice Television Awards, at which Shark Tank won for Best Reality Series.

In 2014, Burnett was named the "Number 1 Reality Producer" on The Hollywood Reporter Reality Power List.

In 2014, Burnett and his wife Roma Downey were recipients of the Anti-Defamation League's Entertainment Industry Award. He and Downey are heavily involved with philanthropic organizations Operation Smile and Compassion International. In 2015, they partnered with the Institute for Global Engagement to launch the Cradle Fund (TCF). TCF is focused on raising $25 million to help Middle Eastern minorities displaced by ISIS to return to a home where they can practice their faith without fear. As of 2019, they have helped more than 10,000 displaced Christian refugees to relocate.

== Filmography ==
=== Productions ===
Key
†	Denotes an unreleased title.

==== Award shows ====
- (2007) 2007 MTV Movie Awards
- (2008) 2008 MTV Movie Awards
- (2010) 36th People's Choice Awards
- (2011) 37th People's Choice Awards
- (2011) 2011 MTV Movie Awards
- (2011) 63rd Primetime Emmy Awards
- (2011) Spike Video Game Awards
- (2012) 38th People's Choice Awards
- (2012) Spike Video Game Awards
- (2014) 40th People's Choice Awards
- (2015) 41st People's Choice Awards
- (2016) 42nd People's Choice Awards
- (2017) 43rd People's Choice Awards

==== Films ====
Year	Title	Notes	Ref.
2003	Are We There Yet?	Television film	
2010	Live for the Moment	Television film	
2014	Son of God		
2014	Women of the Bible	Television film	
2015	Little Boy		
2015	Woodlawn		
2016	Ben-Hur		
2021	Resurrection		
2022	Cirque Du Soleil: Without a Net	Filmed live performance	
2025	Grace for the World: Live from St. Peters Square	Filmed live performance	

==== Television programs ====
The following section lists unscripted or reality television programs including game shows.

Year	Title	Notes	Ref.
1996–2003	Eco-Challenge		
2000–present	Survivor		
2002	Combat Missions		
2003	Boarding House: North Shore		
2003	The Restaurant		
2004	The Casino		
2004–2017	The Apprentice		
2005	The Apprentice: Martha Stewart		
2005	I Can Change Your Life		
2005–2006	Rock Star		
2005–2010	The Martha Stewart Show		
2005–2018	The Contender		
2007	Pirate Master		
2007	On the Lot		
2007–present	Are You Smarter than a 5th Grader?		
2008	Amne$ia		
2008	The Contender Asia		
2008	Rock Band Battle		
2008–2017	The Celebrity Apprentice		
2009	Expedition Africa		
2009	P. Diddy's Starmaker		
2009	Toughest Cowboy	Season 3 only.	
2009	Wedding Day		
2009–2010	How'd You Get So Rich?		
2009–2012	Bully Beatdown		
2009–2013	HGTV Design Star		
2009–2024	Shark Tank	Also credited as director.	
2010–2011	Sarah Palin's Alaska		
2010–2011	Rock 'n Roll Fantasy Camp		
2011	Your OWN Show: Oprah's Search for the Next TV Star		
2011	Audrina		
2011	Expedition Impossible		
2011	Ask Oprah's All-Stars		
2011–present	The Voice		
2012	Stars Earn Stripes		
2012	Romancing the Globe		
2013	Cyndi Lauper: Still So Unusual		
2013	The Job		
2013	Trust Me, I'm a Game Show Host		
2013	Spin Off		
2014	On the Menu		
2014	The Sing-Off	Only season 4.	
2014–2018	Lucha Underground		
2015	Funny or Die Presents: America's Next Weatherman		
2015–2016	500 Questions		
2015–2016	Beyond the Tank		
2016	America's Greatest Makers		
2016	Coupled		
2017	Steve Harvey's Funderdome		
2017	Beat Shazam		
2018	TKO: Total Knock Out		
2018–2022	Unprotected Sets		
2019	The World's Best		
2019	WOW: Women of Wrestling		
2020	Meet the Frasers		
2020	World's Toughest Race: Eco-Challenge Fiji		
2021	The Big Shot with Bethenny		
2022	Ring Nation		
2022–2023	Generation Gap		
2024–2025	Are You Smarter Than a Celebrity?		
TBA	Business Hunters †		
TBA	American Gladiators †		

==== Television series ====
The following section lists television series and miniseries that follow a narrative structure.

Year	Title	Notes	Ref.
2012	School Spirits		
2013	The Bible		
2015	The Dovekeepers		
2015	A.D. The Bible Continues		
2015	Answered Prayers		
2015	Unveiled		
2020	Messiah		
2021	Luis Miguel: The Series		
2023	Secrets of Miss America		
2023	Act Your Age		
TBA	El Gato †		

==== Web series ====
- (2006) Gold Rush
- (2011) CliffsNotes

==== Music videos ====
- (2014) "Mercy" by Anthony Evans

==== Unaired and prematurely cancelled programs ====
- (2000) Destination: Mir
- (2004) Commando Nanny
- (2005) Global Frequency
- (2008) This is Your Life
- (2008) Rebuilding the Kingdom
- (2008) Jingles
- (2010) Our Little Genius
- (2011) Untitled Joel Osteen Reality Show
- (2012) Mark Burnett's Alaska
- (2015) Dream Funded: Let the Crowd Decide
- (2016) Untitled MTV Hip-Hop Reality Competition

=== Appearances ===
Year	Title	Role	Notes	Ref.
2006	"The Computer is Personal Again"	Himself	Advertisement by HP	
2012	Family Guy	Himself	Episode: "Ratings Guy"	

== Published works ==
- Mark Burnett; Martin Dugard (2000). Survivor: the Ultimate Game. New York: TV Books, L. L. C. ISBN 9781575001432.
- Mark Burnett (2001). Dare to Succeed:How to Survive and Thrive in the Game of Life. New York: Hyperion. ISBN 0-7868-6849-X.
- Mark Burnett (2005). Jump In!: Even If You Don't Know How to Swim. New York: Random House. ISBN 0-345-48098-8.

== See also ==
- List of television producers
