= CBS Innertube =

Broadband video channel

- Website type: Broadband video channel / streaming website
- Available in: English
- Country of origin: United States
- Owner: CBS
- Commercial: Yes
- Launched: May 2006
- Current status: Defunct (rebranded as CBS.com in 2007)
- Content license: Television programming

CBS Innertube was a broadband video channel launched by CBS in May 2006. The channel offered original web-only shows, as well as rebroadcasts of CBS's regular shows. The service was only available in the United States. It was rebranded as CBS.com a year later. In 2008, under the CBS.com name, CBS began adding classic television series such as Hawaii Five-O, The Ed Sullivan Show and The Twilight Zone to its selection (also including shows such as Melrose Place, MacGyver and Star Trek: The Original Series, which never aired on CBS but are owned by CBS Television Distribution).

Advertising on Innertube was different and independent from CBS. Sponsors who had network coverage had to purchase Innertube advertising separately. These spots were sold in 15 and 30 second increment, similar to the network version. Although the goal of Innertube was to attract newer, more technologically advanced viewers, CBS had also hoped to gain some overlap from network viewers wishing to watch rebroadcasts of network shows. Finally, CBS planned to include special one-on-one interviews with celebrities.

Nearly a year after its launch, Innertube was not attracting the numbers that had been hoped for. Network executives realized that not many viewers were going to the site and decided to rebrand "Innertube" as "CBS.com", a more recognizable site for its viewers. Much of Innertube's library content is now part of CBS's paid service Paramount+ (formerly CBS All Access).

== See also ==
- Paramount+
- Streaming media
