= True Religion =

American clothing company

- Type: Private
- Industry: Designer jeans, clothing
- Founded: 2002; 24 years ago
- Founders: Kym Gold; Jeff Lubell
- Headquarters: El Segundo, California, U.S.
- Area served: Worldwide
- Key people: Michael Buckley; CEO
- Website: www.truereligion.com

True Religion Brand Jeans is an American clothing company established in 2002 by Jeff Lubell and fashion designer Kym Gold based in El Segundo, California.

== Overview ==
Founded in 2002 by then-husband and wife team Jeff Lubell and Kym Gold, True Religion brand designer jeans are manufactured from premium denim. They also make designer clothing, some of which is made in the United States. In 2009, True Religion was sold in about 900 boutiques and specialty stores in 50 countries on six continents. In May 2021, the company owned 50 retail stores in 30 countries.

== History ==
Unusually, the brand began with the 2002 production of about 14,000 pairs of jeans, being, the co-founder Lubell has remarked, contrary to the typical business model, in which "you make a sample line, go to market, get orders, and ship your production." The company adopted a business model in which everything was outsourced, depending on contractors "to do everything."

Its flagship store opened in 2005, in Manhattan Beach, California. True Religion products are also sold at major department stores, including Von Maur, Nordstrom, Bloomingdales, Saks Fifth Avenue.

True Religion was purchased by TowerBrook Capital Partners on May 10, 2013. The acquisition provided shareholders a 152% premium to True Religion's share price on October 9, 2012. The stock had fallen 40% in 2012 up to October 9, 2012, due to a poor pre-Christmas sales in 2011, and concern that a shrinking number of shoppers were willing to purchase True Religion's high-priced jeans. Forbes also noted that, over the prior three years, True Religion shares had gained just 11.6% while shares in comparable luxury-goods companies VF Corporation, Ralph Lauren Corporation, and PVH Corp. had each more than doubled in value. Prior to the purchase, True Religion traded on NASDAQ under the symbol TRLG.

In November 2019, the company's former president Michael Buckley was appointed CEO, returning to aid in recovery from bankruptcy. Subsequently, Buckley re-hired designer Zihaad Wells as creative director, who had, in late 2006, resigned from Levi's in Europe to join True Religion, also at Buckley's request.

True Religion filed for Chapter 11 bankruptcy protection on July 5, 2017, acknowledging that it had $534.7 million in liabilities and only $243.3 million in assets. It then announced the closure of 27 stores in the United States.

In April 2020, the design company again filed for bankruptcy, closing 37 locations, resulting in a total of 49 stores remaining. The second bankruptcy was completed in November 2020, and the company was considered to have rebounded the following year.

The company appeared to rebound in 2021, with sales topping $235 million.

== See also ==
- Retail apocalypse
