= 1930 in radio =

The year 1930 saw a number of significant happenings in radio broadcasting history.

== Events ==
- 5 March – WFDV, Rome, Georgia, begins broadcasting on 1370 kHz.
- 9 March – The British Broadcasting Corporation (BBC) opens its second high-power medium-wave transmitter at Brookmans Park, north of London, and with it launches its "Regional Scheme" which sees station 5XX renamed as the National Programme while 2LO becomes the London Regional Programme.
- 1 April – The 1930 United States census is the first in that country's history to require households to report the ownership of a radio-receiving set.
- 18 April – BBC radio listeners uniquely hear the announcement "Good evening. Today is Good Friday. There is no news."
- 28 May – The BBC Symphony Orchestra is formed as a permanent full-scale ensemble under the directorship of Adrian Boult. It gives its first concert on 22 October at the Queen's Hall, London.
- 18 June – Establishment in Belgium of the Institut National de Radiodiffusion / Nationaal Instituut voor de Radio-omroep (INR/NIR), a national public-service broadcasting organization modelled on the BBC. It will begin broadcasting on 1 February 1931.
- 1 August – The Trémoulet group, owner of Radio Toulouse, buys the private Bordeaux-based radio station Radio Sud-Ouest.
- 18 September – Establishment of XEW-AM in Mexico City, becoming the country's most important radio station.
- October – Duke Ellington composes his first tune specially for radio transmission, "Dreamy Blues", which becomes the jazz standard "Mood Indigo".
- 16 October – NBC in the United States purchases Cleveland Red Network affiliate WTAM from the Cleveland Electric Illuminating Company and the Van Sweringen brothers.
- 11 November – A powerful new station, Radio Strasbourg-PTT opens in Alsace, eastern France. Its first programme is a performance of Mozart's Requiem in remembrance of those who fell in the Great War of 1914–18.
- 21 November – The German Post Office opens its Mühlacker transmitter in south-west Germany. The country's most powerful medium-wave station to date, it enters full service – with programming from Süddeutscher Rundfunk – on 20 December 1930.
- 20 December – The Icelandic national broadcasting service Ríkisútvarpið (RÚV) begins regular transmissions.
- Goodman Ace, having to fill an empty 15-minute slot on KMBZ in Kansas City, Missouri, engages in talk with his wife, Jane, origin of their Easy Aces radio show.
- Philco produces the first of its "Baby grand" designs of radio in the United Kingdom of which it will sell two million.

== Debuts ==
- 1 January – The Cuckoo Hour debuts on NBC Blue in the United States.
- 17 January – Ben Bernie, the Old Maestro debuts on NBC Blue.
- 4 February – The American School of the Air debuts on CBS.
- 19 March – Coca-Cola Topnotchers debuts on NBC-Red in the United States.
- 14 April – Believe It Or Not debuts on NBC.
- 12 May – Walter Winchell, newspaper gossip columnist for the New York Daily Mirror, does his first radio program on CBS.
- 16 June – Clara, Lu, and Em debuts on WGN.
- 31 July – The Shadow debuts on CBS Radio.
- 30 September – Death Valley Days debuts on NBC Blue.
- 2 October – The Lutheran Hour debuts on CBS Radio. Dr. Walter A. Maier will serve as the program's first speaker for the next twenty years.
- 20 October – The Adventures of Sherlock Holmes debuts on NBC Blue (1930–1936).
- 27 November – The First Nighter Program debuts on NBC Blue.

== Births ==
- 2 January – Julius La Rosa, American singer, perhaps best known for being fired on the air by Arthur Godfrey (died 2016)
- 7 February – Peter Jones, Welsh-born sports commentator (died 1990)
- 4 June – Edward Kelsey, English actor (died 2019)
- 17 July – Ray Galton, British comedy scriptwriter (died 2018)
- 6 October – Richie Benaud, Australian cricketer and commentator (died 2015)
