= The Man Called X (TV series) =

American syndicated television spy drama

- Starring: Barry Sullivan
- Country of origin: United States
- No. of seasons: 2
- No. of episodes: 39

Production
- Producers: Eddie Davis; Herbert L. Strock; Maurice Unger; Frederick W. Ziv
- Production company: Ziv Company

Original release
- Network: Syndication
- Release: January 27, 1956 – April 4, 1957

The Man Called X is an American syndicated television spy drama adapted from the radio series of the same name. Debuting in 1956, it was also broadcast in Australia, Mexico, and Venezuela.

== Overview ==
As with the radio version, The Man Called X related the adventures of secret agent Ken Thurston. Barry Sullivan portrayed Thurston, who regularly used disguises and was inclined to action. Settings varied from episode to episode. Sullivan said, "One week we're in Vienna, another in Honduras. The whole wide world is our background." Stories depicted in the series were taken from "the formerly closest guarded secrets of the world's most famous international intelligence agents". Actresses who appeared on The Man Called X included Joan Vohs.

== Production ==
The Ziv Company produced The Man Called X on film. Ladislas Farago, a former intelligence officer, was the technical adviser. Eddie Davis was the director. Producers included Davis, Herbert L. Strock, Maurice Unger, and Frederick W. Ziv. Writers included Les Crutchfield. Production began in November 1955.

The major regional sponsor for The Man Called X was Ohio Oil, which sponsored it in 13 Midwestern markets. In many other markets the program was sponsored by breweries, with beer brands accounting for about 25 percent of overall sponsorship. Among those was Blatz Beer, with sponsorship in eight markets.

Although the series was sold in more than 100 TV markets and made a profit for Ziv, increasing costs of production led the company to end the series after 39 episodes.

== Other countries ==
The Man Called X was one of six programs that Ziv sold to Amalgamated Television Services for broadcast in Australia. Procter & Gamble sponsored broadcasts of the series in Venezuela and Mexico.

== Episodes ==
=== Season 1 (1956) ===
No. overall	No. in season	Title	Directed by	Written by	Original release date
1	1	"For External Use Only"	Eddie Davis	Story by : Ladislas Farago; Teleplay by : Stuart Jerome, Harold Swanton, and William P. Templeton	January 27, 1956
2	2	"Ballerina Story"	Eddie Davis	Leonard Heideman	February 3, 1956
3	3	"Extradition"	Eddie Davis	Ellis Marcus	February 10, 1956
4	4	"Assassination"	William Castle	Stuart Jerome	February 17, 1956
5	5	"Truth Serum"	Eddie Davis	Harold Swanton	February 24, 1956
6	6	"Afghanistan"	Eddie Davis	Leonard Heideman	March 2, 1956
7	7	"Embassy"	Herbert L. Strock	Laurence Heath and Jack Rock	March 9, 1956
8	8	"Dangerous"	Eddie Davis	George Callahan	March 16, 1956
9	9	"Provocateur"	Eddie Davis	Arthur Weiss	March 23, 1956
10	10	"Local Hero"	Leon Benson	Ellis Marcus	March 30, 1956
11	11	"Maps"	Eddie Davis	Jack Rock	May 4, 1956
12	12	"U.S. Planes"	Eddie Davis	William L. Stuart	April 13, 1956
13	13	"Acoustics"	Eddie Davis	Orville H. Hampton	April 20, 1956
14	14	"The General"	Eddie Davis	Leonard Heideman	April 27, 1956

=== Season 2 (1956–57) ===
No. overall	No. in season	Title	Directed by	Written by	Original release date
15	1	"Missing Plates"	Eddie Davis	Jack Rock	September 27, 1956
16	2	"Enemy Agent"	Eddie Davis	Story by : Teleplay by : Gene Levitt	October 4, 1956
17	3	"Gold"	Eddie Davis	Jack Laird	October 11, 1956
18	4	"Operation Janus"	Eddie Davis	Story by : Teleplay by : Jack Rock and Art Wallace	October 18, 1956
19	5	"Staff Headquarters"	Eddie Davis	Leonard Heideman	October 25, 1956
20	6	"Underground"	Eddie Davis	William L. Stuart	November 1, 1956
21	7	"Spare Parts"	Eddie Davis	Jack Laird	November 8, 1956
22	8	"Fallout"	Eddie Davis	Story by : Teleplay by : Arthur Weiss	November 15, 1956
23	9	"Speech"	Eddie Davis	Story by : Teleplay by : Ande Lamb	November 22, 1956
24	10	"Ship Sabotage"	Eddie Davis	Jack Rock	November 29, 1956
25	11	"Rendezvous"	Eddie Davis	Ellis Marcus	December 5, 1956
26	12	"Switzerland"	Eddie Davis	Leonard Heideman	December 12, 1956
27	13	"Voice On Tape"	Eddie Davis	Story by : Teleplay by : Leonard Heideman	December 19, 1956
28	14	"Code W"	Eddie Davis	Arthur Weiss	December 26, 1956
29	15	"Gas Masks"	Eddie Davis	Story by : Teleplay by : Jack Rock	January 3, 1957
30	16	"Murder"	Eddie Davis	Lee Berg	January 10, 1957
31	17	"Train Blow-Up"	Eddie Davis	Ellis Marcus	February 6, 1957
32	18	"Powder Keg"	Jack Herzberg	Les Crutchfield and Jack Rock	February 13, 1957
33	19	"Passport"	Eddie Davis	Norman Jolley	February 20, 1957
34	20	"Forged Documents"	Eddie Davis	Charles Mergendahl	February 27, 1957
35	21	"Australia"	Lambert Hill	Jack Rock	March 6, 1957
36	22	"Radio"	Eddie Davis	George Callahan	March 13, 1957
37	23	"Business Empire"	Leslie Goodwins	Herbert Purdum and Jack Rock	March 20, 1957
38	24	"Hungary"	Eddie Davis	Fritz Blocki and George Callahan	March 27, 1957
39	25	"Kidnap"	Eddie Davis	George Callahan	April 4, 1957
