= Favorite Story =

American old-time radio dramatic anthology

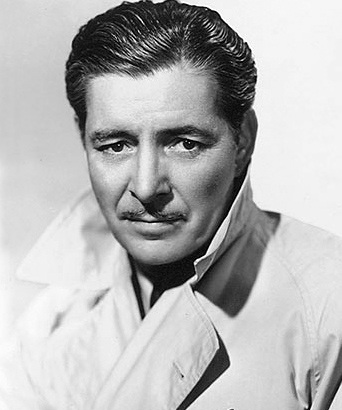
- Ronald Colman, host of Favorite Story
- Genre: Dramatic anthology
- Running time: 30 minutes
- Country of origin: United States
- Language: English
- Home station: KFI
- Syndicates: Ziv Company
- Hosted by: Ronald Colman
- Announcer: George Barclay; True Boardman
- Written by: Jerome Lawrence; Robert E. Lee; William Froug; E. Jack Neuman
- Directed by: Jerome Lawrence; Robert E. Lee
- Produced by: Jerome Lawrence; Robert E. Lee
- Original release: 1946 – 1949
- No. of episodes: 118

Favorite Story is an American old-time radio (and later television) dramatic anthology. It was nationally syndicated by the Ziv Company from 1946 to 1949. The program was "advertised as a show that 'stands head and shoulders above the finest programs on the air'". Originating at KFI in Los Angeles, California, Favorite Story apparently was not related to the similarly named My Favorite Story that ran on KNX in Los Angeles earlier.

== Format ==
Each episode of Favorite Story featured an adaptation of a story selected by a celebrity — purportedly his or her favorite story. The celebrities came from various fields: actors, directors, bandleaders, and athletes, to name but a few. Because they did not appear on the air, the Ziv Company saved any salary that their appearances would have incurred. Compensation came in the form of promoting whatever book, film, or other work the guest had coming up.

Despite the show's premise, many of the stories presented may not have been the celebrities' actual favorites. Christine Becker wrote in her book, It’s the Pictures That Got Small: Hollywood Film Stars on 1950s Television, "Production documents indicate that celebrities were asked for their favorite stories, but they had to select from a predetermined list and were not always matched up with a story they selected."

Stories presented were adaptations of literary classics, including Alice in Wonderland, Frankenstein, Dr. Jekyll & Mr. Hyde, and Oliver Twist. Not only did prestigious titles add an air of quality, but they had the financial advantage of being in the public domain, so that nothing had to be paid for the rights to broadcast them.

The half-hour time span was better suited to short stories than to novels, but Tim DeForest wrote in his book, Radio by the Book: Adaptations of Literature and Fiction on the Airwaves, "In many cases, Favorite Story managed the incredible feat of jamming a classic novel into half an hour and still giving us a rewarding experience."

== Personnel ==
As an anthology, Favorite Story had no regular characters; the only person who appeared in the same role from one episode to another was host Ronald Colman. His presence enhanced the program's appeal to listeners and to executives and sponsors at local stations — a factor essential to having stations broadcast the show. Frederick Ziv, owner of the company that syndicated the program, said that with Colman on board, "Stations were receptive, networks were receptive, sponsors were receptive, audiences were receptive." Becker found that, besides being the host and acting in some episodes, Colman "did indeed have measurable creative input into Favorite Story", such as suggesting how the script writers should adapt the stories for radio.

Actors heard regularly in episodes included Jeff Corey, Edna Best, Lionel Stander, Vincent Price, John Beal, Howard Duff, William Conrad, and Janet Waldo. Jerome Lawrence and Robert E. Lee produced, directed, and wrote for the program. Other writers were William Froug and E. Jack Neuman. Announcers were George Barclay and True Boardman. Music was by Claude Sweeten.

== Television version ==
Beginning in January 1953 a syndicated televised version of the series, titled Your Favorite Story, was released. The host of this series was Adolphe Menjou, who also starred in some of the episodes. Seventy-eight episodes were produced over a two-year period.

== See also ==
- Academy Award Theater
- Author's Playhouse
- The Campbell Playhouse
- Cavalcade of America
- CBS Radio Workshop
- The Cresta Blanca Hollywood Players
- Curtain Time
- Ford Theatre
- General Electric Theater
- Hollywood Hotel (radio program)
- Lux Radio Theatre
- The Mercury Theatre on the Air
- The MGM Theater of the Air
- The Screen Guild Theater
- Screen Director's Playhouse
- Stars over Hollywood
- Theater Guild on the Air
