= Ziv Company =

US-based entertainment company

Frederic W. Ziv Company
- Industry: Entertainment
- Founded: 1937
- Headquarters: Cincinnati, Ohio, United States
- Products: Syndicated radio and television programs
- Owner: Frederic Ziv
- Subsidiaries: Ziv Television Programs, Inc.

Frederic W. Ziv Company (also given as Frederick W. Ziv Company) produced syndicated radio and television programs in the United States. Horace Newcomb's Encyclopedia of Television described the company as "by 1948 ... the largest packager and syndicator of radio programs" and later "the most prolific producer of programming for the first-run syndication market during the 1950s."

== Background ==
Frederic Ziv, the company's founder, developed his ideas for the company while operating an advertising agency in Cincinnati, Ohio. During the era of old-time radio, "Cincinnati was a surprisingly active regional center for radio production." Two business entities contributed to that situation. First, radio station WLW in Cincinnati was "a major source of radio programming that offered local stations an alternative to network-originated programming." Second, in an era when sponsors produced most radio programs, Cincinnati was the headquarters of Procter & Gamble, one of radio's "most influential advertisers."

Ziv's Juris Doctor degree from the University of Michigan proved useful in his work in syndication. Michael J. Neufeld wrote in his book, Spacefarers: Images of Astronauts and Cosmonauts in the Heroic Era of Spaceflight, "Ziv envisioned every sales pitch as a legal argument, anticipating counterarguments and preparing rejoinders beforehand."

While producing programs for WLW, Ziv met writer John L. Sinn, and in 1937 they began Frederic W. Ziv Company as a program syndication business.

== Concept ==
The Ziv Company offered an opportunity to local and regional businesses that could not afford to produce programs whose quality would match that of network programs. Ziv's alternative was the use of transcriptions – programs recorded on discs and offered to local advertisers in each radio market. Charges for the programs were based on the market's size. The result was "affordable quality programming that could be scheduled in any available slot on a station's schedule."

In an interview in Irv Broughton's book, Producers on Producing: The Making of Film and Television, Ziv noted that, although he was often called the "father of syndication," the concept was not original with him. "That's the tag that followed me," he said, "and is still being used. I developed the technique; I didn't originate it. I'm not sure if anyone preceded me. I did expand on it and brought it to what was probably its highest level." Hal Erickson wrote in Syndicated Television: The First Forty Years, 1947-1987, "It was Frederick [sic] W. Ziv who brought sophistication to syndication, turning it into a science, combining modern recording techniques with a masterful sense of merchandising."

Erickson added that Ziv recognized the financial advantage of syndication: "his company would be paid outright for its programs, avoiding the usual percentages handed over to the networks."

Although the company targeted stations without network affiliation, some stations that were part of networks also bought and broadcast Ziv programs. For example, in September 1951, WNBC-AM (the NBC flagship station in New York City) bought Ziv's Bold Venture, Bright Star, Favorite Story and Guy Lombardo Show for 52 weeks each. The station's general manager commented that the programs would help local business to advertise on top-budgeted shows at "realistic prices".

== Size ==
At its peak, Ziv Company had more than 3,000 employees (full-time and part-time combined). In 1950, it took a five-year lease on "a substantial portion of the California Studios, formerly the Enterprise Film lot", and in 1954, it bought the Eagle-Lion Films lot in Hollywood, California. Its property included seven sound stages with related facilities such as projection rooms and cutting rooms.

== Promotion and support ==
Frederic Ziv believed, "If a show is properly exploited and promoted, it will go." To that end, Ziv Company went beyond simply selling the programs. A sales-and-service staff made calls on local stations in order to help them promote Ziv programs (both radio and television) with support materials such as "posters, brochures, promotional kits and ad slicks". The goal was to present "one slogan, one point of view." Success was enhanced by Ziv salesmen's never trying to sell more than one program at a time to a station and their willingness to help stations find sponsors after a program was sold.

Stars of Ziv programs also contributed their own efforts to support, such as when Adolphe Menjou, star of the television version of Favorite Story, traveled across the United States in 1953 to promote his then-new program. An article in the trade publication Billboard described Menjou's trip as "part of Ziv's stepped-up merchandising program." A year later, David Brian toured cities in the Eastern United States promoting the radio and television versions of his Mr. District Attorney program.

== Radio ==
Frederic Ziv's first effort in syndication came before the company was formed. In 1935, he created a program, The Freshest Thing in Town for Rubel Bakery in Cincinnati, after having first created an advertising campaign that had the same theme. When bakers in other markets heard about the show's success, they contacted the bakery's owner, who referred them to Ziv. That led to his having copies of the transcription made to send to those other bakers for broadcast in their home markets. In a 1998 interview, Ziv estimated that three dozen bakeries eventually used the program. That program lasted about five years. By 1947, the reach of Ziv Company's programming was such that 675 stations carried Ziv programs, some for as much as nine hours per week.

=== Three-faceted approach ===
Three elements worked together to contribute to Ziv's success in radio. Derek Kompare, in his book Rerun Nation: How Repeats Invented American Television, observed:

Ziv had built a network-like reputation for programming through several shrewd principles exploiting "presold" properties by acquiring the radio rights to established characters and texts; pursuing Hollywood-level talent wherever possible; and making program sales and promotion the firm's top priority in every market. Ziv himself was perhaps the most ardent supporter of syndicated transcriptions in radio at this time [the late 1940s], creating and distributing series that often ran on more stations than comparable network programming.

=== Hollywood stars ===
The company's success was bolstered by employing movie stars for key roles in some of its series. Those stars included Dana Andrews, Irene Dunne, Fred MacMurray, Ronald Colman, Adolphe Menjou, Humphrey Bogart and Lauren Bacall. Such talent was not inexpensive. For example, Colman's contract with Ziv for the radio version of Favorite Story guaranteed him $150,000 per year for at least three years. Colman's contract also provided that he could record the programs at his own convenience, thus enabling him to work his radio schedule around his commitments to do films. Dunne and MacMurray signed 10-year contracts when they agreed to do Bright Star in 1951, with terms under which each would "gross $300,000 from the series, via their guaranties [sic] – against percentage of sales deals." One indication of the success of using recognized Hollywood talent was that in 1951, Bold Venture (starring Bogart and Bacall), was sold in more than 500 cities.

=== Repackaging ===
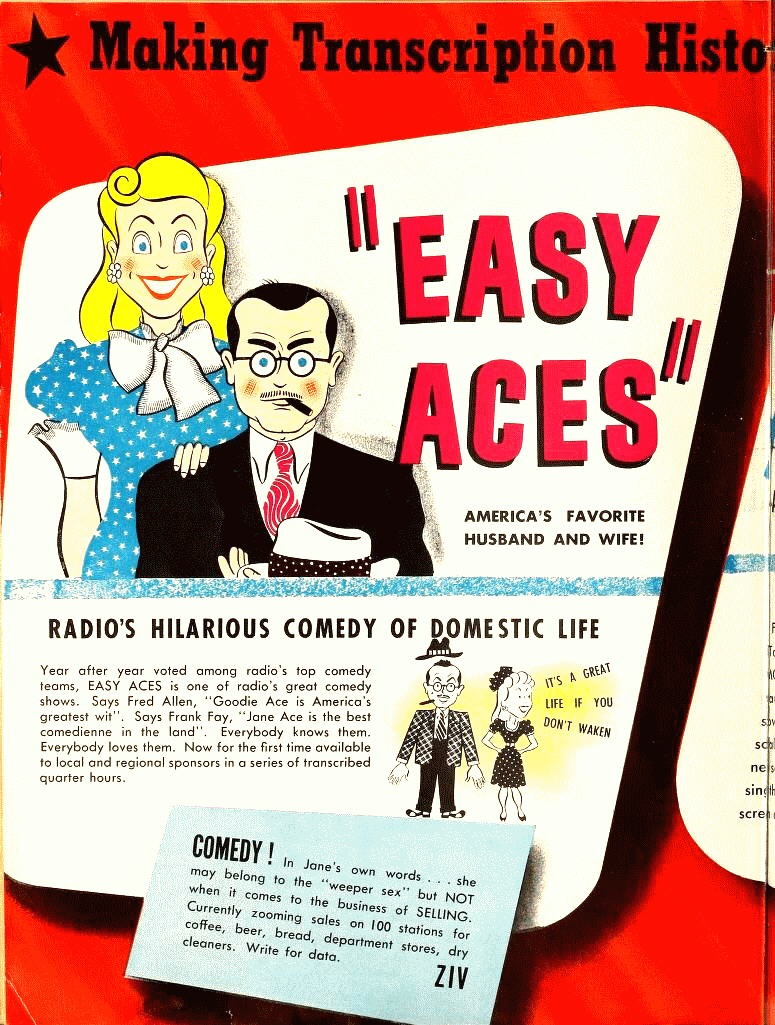
1945 advertisement for syndicated Easy Aces programs originally performed from 1937 to 1941.

In addition to producing successful original programming, Ziv was a pioneer in re-using transcribed series that had already been broadcast on radio. Rather than simply reproducing the programs as originally recorded, Ziv personnel created "repackaged" versions, "usually with new titles and/or formats," Kompare wrote. "For example, the company acquired the rights to Skippy Hollywood Theatre of the Air in 1951, which was retitled Movietown Radio Theatre for syndication."

=== Finances ===
Ziv invested significant amounts of money in its radio programs. In 1946, for example, Billboard reported, "Three Ziv quarter-hour musical programs, each contracted for a series of 130 disks, represent an investment of $750,000." The bulk of that money went to paying performers on the Barry Wood Show, Sincerely, Kenny Baker and Pleasure Parade.

In 1947, Ziv had gross revenue of more than $10 million on its sales of 23 radio programs, an increase of more than 30 percent over the previous year. An article in Billboard called the company the "largest of the open-end transcription producers in the country." Ziv's revenue was estimated to be at least one-third of the total of all transcription sales in the United States.

=== Advertisers ===
Revenue came not only from advertisers at the local and regional levels, but also from national sponsors such as Borden, Vicks, Wildroot Cream-Oil and Grove Laboratories. In 1950, increased advertising on television resulted in national advertisers often shifting their remaining funds from network radio to syndicated radio programs, especially those of the Ziv Company, which an article in Billboard called "undoubtedly the top transcription and library firm." The company created new divisions in the southeast, southwest and north central United States and added 14 sales people to handle the increase in business.

== Television ==
Ziv Television Programs began in 1948 as a subsidiary of the main company. Erickson described the company's approach by writing, "Fred Ziv tackled the new medium like a man devouring sirloin, setting up a television-film factory of the first calibre."

Ziv called himself "a pioneer as far as television production is concerned." Although he had no guarantee that television would succeed, he felt safe in pursuing that direction because radio had already succeeded. "We felt that television was just the logical next step," he said.

The company's new direction led to expansion of its offices. Although the headquarters remained in Cincinnati, it eventually opened additional offices in Hollywood and New York City.

=== Rights ===
Ziv bought the rights to all of the programs that he produced. He commented in a 1998 interview that such rights came cheaply in the early days of TV: "Television was a new thing, and they didn't know if it would last. 'Why do you want those rights for 20 years [they thought] when it may not last for 20 weeks?'" He had the foresight to include rights for future television productions in contracts when he bought a program's radio rights, even though the people with whom he contracted wondered why he did so. He explained, "'Why would you want the rights to television ... when there is no television?' That's the question that was asked by the people who owned the O. Henry stories." He added that television rights were inexpensive to obtain; "They were glad to get [the money]," he said.

=== Film ===
Ziv noted that The Cisco Kid was likely one of the first – "if not the first" – television program produced on film. He encountered no opposition from Hollywood because people were happy for the employment that the TV productions provided. Ziv used color film for the television version of The Cisco Kid, which began in 1949 (before color TV sets were sold). Ziv again encountered a lack of belief or understanding of what he was doing. "The people – the engineers, the laboratory – felt that the color film would never be usable – if color ever came," he said. "It turned out they were all wrong. Color television did come, and as you know, the programs we shot in color in the very early days are still being used."

=== Early programs ===
The company's first two television programs were Yesterday's Newsreel and Sports Album. Material for those programs came from Ziv's purchase of General Film Library, which Erickson described as "so vast that it had storehouses on both coasts". The shows were produced by packaging segments from the library for television. Yesterday's Newsreel featured events like the Hindenburg disaster and the sinking of the Titanic. It was a 15-minute program, while Sports Album ran 5 minutes. The Cisco Kid, Ziv's first dramatic series, began in 1949 and was produced until 1956, resulting in 156 episodes. The program's gross revenue for its first 10 years in syndication was $11 million.

=== Economee TV ===
In 1954, the company created a subsidiary, Economee TV, to market its older programs to stations. The move came as Ziv and other syndicating companies sought to broaden their outreach and appeal to more television stations. Essentially, Economee TV handled reruns of older Ziv Television series, while the original TV operation handled new programs that Ziv produced. Erickson traced the formation of Economee TV mainly to the continuing success of Highway Patrol – "the biggest money-maker Ziv ever had". The program, which began in 1955, was still generating profits in reruns a decade later.

== Competition from networks ==
Initially, "We fought the networks tooth and nail every day," Ziv said, "in Washington, before courts and before the FCC, because they had an unfair advantage" with regard to national advertisers. Ziv's programs were primarily sponsored by companies like Coors Brewing Company and Interstate Bakeries, which distributed products over much of the United States but were not sold in some areas. When those companies sponsored a program, Ziv would sell to other advertisers in the limited markets not reached by the main sponsor.

== Purchase of World Broadcasting System ==
In August 1948, Ziv added to its library of transcribed programs by buying World Broadcasting System , with the price reported to be $1,500,000. The trade publication Broadcasting reported, "The deal was the latest in a series of shrewd and boldly-planned business coups that have buttressed the Ziv Company's steady-increasing pre-eminence in the packaged show field." At the time of the sale, 670 AM, FM and television stations subscribed to the WBS library. Besides acquiring WBS's packaged programs, the deal also provided Ziv Company with "the largest collection of royalty-free recorded music in existence", eliminating the need to pay licensing fees to the American Society of Composers, Authors and Publishers for music used in producing Ziv's programs.

== Sale to United Artists ==
In March 1960, United Artists bought Ziv Television Programs, Inc. for $20,750,000. That amount included a combined $6,750,000 in installment notes and debentures and UA's assumption of approximately $14,000,000 in debt. About eight months prior to UA's purchase, two investment firms – F. Eberstadt & Co. and Lazard Freres & Co. – had purchased about 80 percent of Ziv Company's stock with Frederic W. Ziv and John L. Sinn keeping the remaining 20 percent. Effective with the sale, the former Ziv Company became a subsidiary of United Artists and was named Ziv-United Artists Television Co. Inc. Ziv and Sinn retained their respective positions as board chairman and president.

== Legacy ==
The Frederic W. Ziv Media Heritage Center in Cincinnati houses an archive related to the Ziv Company as well as other elements of broadcasting from the Cincinnati area.

== Partial list of Ziv programs ==
=== Radio ===
- Bold Venture
- Boston Blackie
- Bright Star
- Calling All Girls
- Easy Aces
- Eye Witness News
- Favorite Story
- Freedom USA
- The Guy Lombardo Show
- Hour of Stars
- I Was a Communist for the FBI
- The Jack Berch Show
- Manhunt
- Mr. District Attorney
- Musical Showcase
- Old Corral
- Parents Magazine of the Air
- Philo Vance
- Pleasure Parade
- Say It with Music
- Songs of Good Cheer
- They Gave Their Lives
- War Correspondent
- The Wayne King Show

=== Television ===
- Bat Masterson
- Boston Blackie
- The Cisco Kid
- Easy Aces
- The Eddie Cantor Comedy Theatre
- Favorite Story
- Highway Patrol
- I Led Three Lives
- Meet Corliss Archer
- Mr. District Attorney
- The New Adventures of Martin Kane
- Science Fiction Theatre
- Sea Hunt
- Waterfront
