= Mary Hunter =

Mary Hunter may refer to:

- Mary Bonnaeu McElveen, birth name of Bonnie McElveen-Hunter (born 1950), American businesswoman, philanthropist, and diplomat
- Mary Hunter Austin (1868–1934), American writer
- Mary Hunter Wolf (1904–2000), American theater director and producer
