= Easy Aces (TV series) =

American TV comedy series (1949–1950)

- Genre: Comedy
- Written by: Goodman Ace; George Foste; Mort Green
- Directed by: Jeanne Harrison
- Starring: Goodman Ace; Jane Ace
- Country of origin: United States

Production
- Running time: 15 minutes
- Production company: Ziv

Original release
- Network: DuMont
- Release: December 14, 1949 – June 14, 1950

Related
- Easy Aces (radio program)

Easy Aces is an American comedy television program that was broadcast on the DuMont network from December 14, 1949, until June 14, 1950. It was also syndicated during its time on the network.

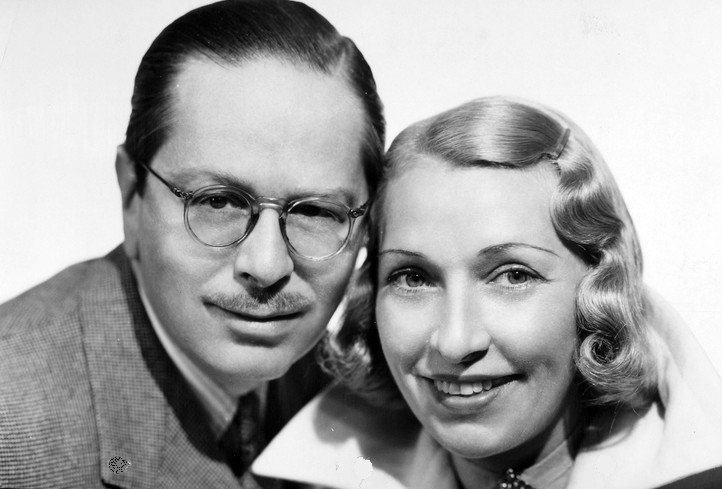
Goodman and Jane Ace, stars of Easy Aces

Easy Aces was an adaptation of the radio program of the same name, but media critic John Crosby commented, "The show doesn't resemble the Easy Aces of radio very closely". The husband and wife team of Goodman Ace and Jane Ace starred. His "witty, intelligent" persona contrasted with her character's "charming bundle of malapropisms." They portrayed a married couple who lived in the suburbs. Betty Garde portrayed Jane's mother. Episodes were staged in a set that represented the Aces' home, with each episode beginning with the couple watching television. A camera provided viewers with a closeup of the TV set's picture, and the action on the TV set formed the basis for the Aces' comments during the episode. The concept was described as a "television show within a television show".

Originating at WABD-TV, the filmed program was broadcast on Wednesday nights from 7:45 to 8 p.m. Eastern Time. Its competition was a news broadcast on NBC and The Earl Wrightson Show on CBS. Ziv Television Programs produced the show. Jeanne Harrison was the director. Goodman Ace, George Foster, and Mort Green were the writers. The Phillips Food Company sponsored the program in the 15 markets reached by DuMont.
