= Bright Star (radio) =

Radio comedy-drama show

Bright Star and other radio shows about newspaper reporters were collected on this boxed set of CDs.

Bright Star (also known as The Irene Dunne-Fred MacMurray Show) was a 30-minute, 52 episode radio comedy-drama broadcast in 1952–53 and syndicated by Ziv.

The storyline followed the misadventures of Hillsdale Morning Star editor Susan Armstrong (Irene Dunne) and her idealistic ace reporter George Harvey (Fred MacMurray) as they attempted to keep the struggling newspaper in business despite continual financial problems.

Harry von Zell and, later, Wendell Niles were the announcers for the series.

== See also ==
- The Big Story
- Ford Theater
- Nightbeat

== Listen to ==
- Internet Archive: Bright Star
