= List of The Cisco Kid episodes =

This is a list of episodes for the television series The Cisco Kid.

== Series overview ==
Season	Episodes	Originally released	
Season	Episodes	First released	Last released
1	26	September 5, 1950	February 20, 1951
2	26	September 3, 1951	February 19, 1952
3	26	August 3, 1952	March 8, 1953
4	26	October 1, 1953	March 25, 1954
5	26	September 25, 1954	March 17, 1955
6	26	October 6, 1955	March 22, 1956

== Episodes ==
=== Season 1 (1950–51) ===
No. overall	No. in season	Title	Directed by	Written by	Original release date
1	1	"Boomerang"	Derwin Abrahams	J. Benton Cheney	September 5, 1950
Cisco and Pancho are being impersonated by two bandits who have committed robbery and murder, so they have to break jail to prove their innocence.
2	2	"Counterfeit Money"	Derwin Abrahams	J. Benton Cheney	September 12, 1950
A team of counterfeiters are using a secret room in a bank to make their fake money, and forcing the banker to pass it.
3	3	"Rustling"	Derwin Abrahams	J. Benton Cheney	September 19, 1950
Pancho and Cisco are framed for murder by a rancher who is secretly running a gang of rustlers.
4	4	"Big Switch"	Derwin Abrahams	Royal K. Cole	September 26, 1950
Jim Holbrook plans to kill his boss, ranch owner Henry P. Murdock, and replace him with lookalike Jim Hardy (Jack Ingram in a dual role).
5	5	"Convict Story"	Derwin Abrahams	Sherman L. Lowe	October 3, 1950
An escaped convict steals Pancho's horse and clothes while he is taking a swim. He then goes after the mine owner he says framed him.
6	6	"Oil Land"	Derwin Abrahams	J. Benton Cheney	October 10, 1950
Cisco and Pancho are suspected of murdering a rancher who has just discovered oil on his property.
7	7	"Chain Lightning"	Derwin Abrahams	J. Benton Cheney	October 14, 1950
Jim Brent is released from prison and is out to get revenge on the men who sent him there, including Cisco and Pancho.
8	8	"Medicine Flats"	Derwin Abrahams	J. Benton Cheney	October 17, 1950
Cisco and Pancho pretend to be wanted for killing a sheriff, in order to join a gang of rustlers.
9	9	"Railroad Land Rush"	Derwin Abrahams	Sherman L. Lowe	October 28, 1950
Cisco and Pancho are on the trail of a con man who murdered a railroad detective who was onto his phony land scheme.
10	10	"The Will"	Derwin Abrahams	Royal K. Cole	October 31, 1950
Pancho and Cisco try to help a young freight wagon driver who was recently released from prison prove he was innocent.
11	11	"Cattle Quarantine"	Derwin Abrahams	J. Benton Cheney	November 7, 1950
A crooked cattle buyer is trying to take over ranches by using a county livestock inspector to create a phony epidemic.
12	12	"Renegade Son"	Derwin Abrahams	Betty Burbridge	November 21, 1950
Cisco and Pancho break a woman out of jail, after she has been sentenced to hang for a murder she did not commit.
13	13	"False Marriage"	Derwin Abrahams	Betty Burbridge	November 28, 1950
A wealthy rancher is trying to prevent the marriage of his niece to a notorious gambler. Cisco and Pancho try to help him, but are accused of his murder when the rancher is found dead.
14	14	"Wedding Blackmail"	Paul Landres	Sherman L. Lowe	December 5, 1950
Cisco and Pancho try to help a young bank teller, whose marriage to the bank president's daughter is endangered by two gunmen who are blackmailing him with a secret from his past.
15	15	"Lynching Story"	Paul Landres	Ande Lamb	December 12, 1950
Pancho and Cisco try to prevent a mob from lynching the prospective son-in-law of a mine owner when the man is found murdered.
16	16	"Newspaper Crusader"	Albert Herman	Betty Burbridge	December 19, 1950
Cisco and Pancho arrive in the town of Sundance. The town is in turmoil with local thug Judd trying to take over. After Cisco sees the destruction of a local newspaper office, he decides to hang around and sort things out.
17	17	"Dog Story"	Albert Herman	J. Benton Cheney	December 26, 1950
A prospector's dog plays an important role in bringing to justice the two men who killed the prospector. Kenne Duncan as the station agent.
18	18	"Confession for Money"	Paul Landres	Betty Burbridge & Ande Lamb	January 2, 1951
A young woman asks Cisco and Pancho to help her fiance, who has confessed to a robbery and murder he didn't commit in order to get money for his mother's surgery.
19	19	"The Old Bum"	Albert Herman	Louise Rousseau	January 9, 1951
A poor man steals Cisco and Pancho's horses, trying to raise money to impress his visiting daughter. Later, he becomes the unsuspecting fall guy in a cattle rustling operation. Kenne Duncan as the Sheriff.
20	20	"Haven for Heavies"	Paul Landres	Warren Wilson	January 13, 1951
Cisco follows the killer of a U.S. marshal to the town of Twin Buttes, which is notorious as a haven for criminals of all kinds.
21	21	"Pancho Held Hostage"	Paul Landres	Betty Burbridge	January 16, 1951
After having captured and jailed a bank robber, Pancho is taken hostage by the robber's sister, who threatens to kill him unless Cisco frees her brother.
22	22	"Freight Line Feud"	Albert Herman	Elizabeth Beecher	January 27, 1951
Elaine, the owner of Western Freighting Co., is convinced that Bill Jarrett, owner of the soon-to-open Jarrett Stage Line, is responsible for the robbery of one of her wagons. She also thinks that Cisco and Pancho are in cahoots with Jarrett.
23	23	"Phoney Sheriff"	Paul Landres	J. Benton Cheney	February 6, 1951
Cisco and Pancho have their cattle stolen by a gang posing as a sheriff's posse.
24	24	"Uncle Disinherits Niece"	Paul Landres	Betty Burbridge	February 13, 1951
A rancher threatens to disinherit his niece unless she stops seeing her boyfriend. When the rancher is found murdered, suspicion falls on her lover. Cisco and Pancho must find the real killer and clear the young man's name.
25	25	"Phoney Heiress"	Paul Landres	J. Benton Cheney	February 13, 1951
A young woman who has inherited some property is about to be swindled out of it by a crooked lawyer who has hired an impostor to pretend to be the rightful owner. She asks Cisco and Pancho to help her keep her property.
26	26	"Water Rights"	Albert Herman	Raymond L. Schrock	February 20, 1951
Cisco and Pancho witness some strange behavior by a coach driver near the town of Guunison. Suddenly they are accused of attempting to rob the stage. Cisco clearly wants to clear his name; however, while investigating Cisco discovers a much bigger game being played. Kenne Duncan as the Sheriff.

=== Season 2 (1951–52) ===
No. overall	No. in season	Title	Directed by	Written by	Original release date
27	1	"Performance Bond"	Albert Herman	Louise Rousseau	September 3, 1951
Cisco and Pancho try to find who has been sabotaging a woman's company freight wagons, before she loses the $20,000 performance bond she put up.
28	2	"Stolen Bonds"	Paul Landres	J. Benton Cheney	September 10, 1951
Cisco and Pancho are after a thief who stole $25,000 in bonds from a friend of theirs. They soon begin to suspect that a young woman who is a cook in a hotel is actually the thief's partner.
29	3	"Postal Inspector"	Paul Landres	J. Benton Cheney	September 17, 1951
While in the town of Baxter Center, Cisco and Pancho stop by to drop a letter in the mail. To their surprise, they find themselves being arrested on suspicion of being part of a gang of mail robbers.
30	4	"Jewelry Store Fence"	Paul Landres	J. Benton Cheney	September 24, 1951
A crazy old man tries to kill Cisco and Pancho with a crossbow.
31	5	"Foreign Agent"	Paul Landres	J. Benton Cheney	October 1, 1951
Cisco and Pancho have to stop a gang of foreign agents from getting their hands on a vast tungsten deposit.
32	6	"Medicine Man Show"	Eddie Davis	Warren Wilson	October 8, 1951
After answering Chief Flying Cloud's smoke signal for help in preventing an Indian war, Cisco and Pancho go undercover as Professor Lorenzo Lombardi and Chief Waho's Cure-All Medicine Show, in an attempt to break up an arms smuggling ring.
33	7	"Ghost Story"	Paul Landres	Elizabeth Beecher	October 15, 1951
A pair of silver smugglers murder their partner, a local rancher, when he tries to back out of the operation. Cisco and Pancho set out to get them.
34	8	"Protective Association"	Paul Landres	Marjorie E. Fortin	October 22, 1951
Cisco and Pancho help a rancher and his daughter who are victims of a gang running a "protection" racket.
35	9	"Kid Sister Trouble"	Paul Landres	Louise Rousseau	October 29, 1951
Cisco an Pancho get mixed up with a sharpshooting lady gambler and a gang of counterfeiters.
36	10	"Water Toll"	Paul Landres	J. Benton Cheney	November 5, 1951
Cisco and Pancho come to the aid of a lady rancher who's fighting a greedy cattle baron who's making ranchers and drovers pay him for watering their herds.
37	11	"The Bates Story"	Paul Landres	Sherman L. Lowe	November 12, 1951
Cisco and Pancho are forced to switch clothes with two escaped convicts, and are later arrested when they are mistaken for the fleeing criminals.
38	12	"Water Well Oil"	Paul Landres	Ande Lamb	November 13, 1951
Cisco and Pancho find themselves being shot at by a quick-tempered young man who's found oil on his ranch and thinks that they're trying to take it from him.
39	13	"Ride On"	Eddie Davis	Warren Wilson	November 19, 1951
40	14	"Vigilante Story"	Paul Landres	J. Benton Cheney	December 4, 1951
In order to break up a gang of vigilantes that's terrorizing the people of Buffalo Flats, Cisco and Pancho head into town disguised as a gambler and an organ grinder.
41	15	"Hidden Valley"	Eddie Davis	J. Benton Cheney	December 11, 1951
Cisco and Poncho are trapped by a ex pirate who runs a slave camp, with Indian guards, in a secret valley with his gorgeous niece who wants no part of it. Stars George Eldredge.
42	16	"Carrier Pigeon"	Paul Landres	J. Benton Cheney	December 18, 1951
A valuable diamond necklace is stolen and the gems are sent by pigeon to a pair of crooks for re-cutting. An insurance agent posing as a dancer is tracking the jewels and seeks help from Cisco and Pancho.
43	17	"Hypnotist Murder"	Eddie Davis	J. Benton Cheney	December 25, 1951
Cisco and Pancho intervene when a woman, using her hypnotism skills, tries to get her husband and his rich father killed. Later, she gets blackmailed by another woman.
44	18	"Romany Caravan"	Paul Landres	J. Benton Cheney	January 8, 1952
While at a gypsy camp, Cisco gets into an altercation over a woman, and Pancho finds himself being on the receiving end of the unwelcome attentions of a large dancing bear.
45	19	"Robber Crow"	Paul Landres	Herbert Purdom	January 15, 1952
Cisco and Pancho find themselves in the middle of a feud between the guards at a gold mine and the mine's workers, whom the guards suspect of stealing gold from the mine.
46	20	"Sleeping Gas"	Paul Landres	J. Benton Cheney	January 22, 1952
Cisco and Pancho go up against a gang of bank robbers who use a sleeping gas potion in their robberies. Stars George Eldredge.
47	21	"Quarter Horse"	Eddie Davis	J. Benton Cheney	January 29, 1952
Cisco takes part in an endurance race to help prove four quarter-horses can beat one thoroughbred, while the man entrusted to hold the race money is planning to steal it. Stars George Eldredge.
48	22	"Jewelry Holdup"	Paul Landres	J. Benton Cheney	February 5, 1952
Cisco and Pancho get involved when a gang of jewel thieves, who've mailed themselves part of their haul, are prevented from getting their package by a by-the-book postal clerk and decide to take it by force.
49	23	"Ghost Town"	Eddie Davis	J. Benton Cheney	February 12, 1952
Stars George Eldredge
50	24	"Quicksilver Murder"	Paul Landres	J. Benton Cheney	February 12, 1952
A crooked prosecutor robs quicksilver shipments, then uses chemical weapons to commit murder. Cisco and Pancho investigate.
51	25	"Buried Treasure"	Paul Landres	J. Benton Cheney	February 19, 1952
Cisco tries to save the cabin boy of famed pirate Jean Lafitte — now a wizened old man — from the hands of an ancient old crone and her evil sons, who are after Lafitte's lost treasure.
52	26	"Spanish Dagger"	Paul Landres	J. Benton Cheney & Walker A. Tomkins	February 19, 1952
Cisco rescues an old prospector from a mine explosion. He discovers an ancient jeweled dagger that places a curse on anyone who steals it.

=== Season 3 (1952–53) ===
No. overall	No. in season	Title	Directed by	Written by	Original release date
53	1	"Monkey Business"	Eddie Davis	Robert White	August 3, 1952
54	2	"The Puppeteer"	George Cahan	Irwin Lieberman	August 10, 1952
55	3	"The Talking Dog"	Eddie Davis	Warren Wilson	August 17, 1952
56	4	"Pancho and the Pachyderm"	George Cahan	Elizabeth Beecher & Jack Lewis	October 5, 1952
57	5	"Kid Brother"	Eddie Davis	Richard S. Conway	October 12, 1952
58	6	"Face of Death"	George Cahan	J. Benton Cheney	October 19, 1952
59	7	"Big Steal"	Eddie Davis	J. Benton Cheney	October 19, 1952
60	8	"Laughing Badman"	George Cahan	Elizabeth Beecher	October 26, 1952
61	9	"Canyon City Kid"	George Cahan	Warren Wilson	November 2, 1952
62	10	"Dutchman's Flat"	George Cahan	J. Benton Cheney	November 9, 1952
63	11	"Mad About Money"	Eddie Davis	Don Brinkley	November 16, 1952
64	12	"Lost City of the Incas"	George Cahan	Warren Wilson	November 23, 1952
65	13	"Thunderhead"	Sobey Martin	J. Benton Cheney	November 30, 1952
66	14	"Bell of Santa Margarita"	Sobey Martin	Edmond Kelso	December 14, 1952
67	15	"Lodestone"	Sobey Martin	J. Benton Cheney	December 21, 1952
68	16	"Dead by Proxy"	Eddie Davis	Robert Clayton	December 28, 1952
69	17	"The Devil's Deputy"	Eddie Davis	Richard S. Conway	January 4, 1953
70	18	"Church in the Town"	Eddie Davis	Edmond Kelso	January 11, 1953
A traveling Jehovah's Witness minister and his son stop in the town where the minister's estranged brother lives. While there, they are persecuted by some of the local thugs.
71	19	"Gun Totin' Papa"	Sobey Martin	Unknown	January 18, 1953
72	20	"The Fire Engine"	Eddie Davis	Irwin Lieberman	January 25, 1953
73	21	"The Census Taker"	Sobey Martin	Endre Bohem & Hilda Bohem	February 1, 1953
74	22	"Smuggled Silver"	Sobey Martin	J. Benton Cheney & Edmond Kelso	February 8, 1953
75	23	"The Runaway Kid"	Sobey Martin	Richard S. Conway	February 15, 1953
76	24	"Fear"	Eddie Davis	J. Benton Cheney	February 22, 1953
77	25	"The Photo Studio"	Sobey Martin	J. Benton Cheney	March 1, 1953
78	26	"The Commodore Goes West"	Eddie Davis	Robert Clayton	March 8, 1953

=== Season 4 (1953–54) ===
No. overall	No. in season	Title	Directed by	Written by	Original release date
79	1	"Bodyguard"	Eddie Davis	Barney A. Sarecky	October 1, 1953
80	2	"Pancho and the Wolf Dog"	Lambert Hillyer	Warren Wilson	October 8, 1953
81	3	"Bullets and the Booby Trap"	Herbert I. Leeds	Edmond Kelso	October 15, 1953
82	4	"The Gramophone"	Lew Landers	Roy Hamilton	October 22, 1953
83	5	"Freedom of the Press"	Paul Landres	Lawrence L. Goldman	October 29, 1953
Cisco and Pancho help a newspaper editor who's caught in the middle of an important election fight between a crooked mayor trying to hold on to power and a young reformer.
84	6	"Battle of Red Rock Pass"	Lew Landers	Ben Markson	November 5, 1953
85	7	"Bandaged Badman"	Eddie Davis	Donn Mullally	November 12, 1953
86	8	"Chinese Gold"	Eddie Davis	George Callahan	November 19, 1953
87	9	"The Faded General"	Lambert Hillyer	Donn Mullally	November 26, 1953
88	10	"The Fugitive"	Herbert I. Leeds	Donn Mullally	December 3, 1953
89	11	"Indian Uprising"	Lew Landers	Larry Lund	December 10, 1953
90	12	"The Raccoon Story"	Paul Landres	Warren Wilson	December 17, 1953
Cisco and Pancho are asked to deliver the death certificate of Gus Brown, an old miner, to the town of Sweetwater. They discover that Brown has left all of his property to his best friend — his dog.
91	13	"Outlaw's Gallery"	Lew Landers	Ben Markson	December 24, 1953
Cisco and Pancho help rescue Will Roberts, an artist whose paintings helped identify members of the Express bandit gang.
92	14	"The Black Terror"	Eddie Davis	Frank Burt	December 31, 1953
In an attempt to round up two rival bands of outlaws, Cisco wears a black mask and goes undercover as The Black Terror.
93	15	"Sky Sign"	Eddie Davis	George Callahan	January 7, 1954
94	16	"Cisco Meets the Gorilla"	Lambert Hillyer	Edmond Kelso	January 14, 1954
A band of outlaws commits a series of robberies, while a sheriff and his deputy hunt down a gorilla on the loose.
95	17	"Not Guilty"	Paul Landres	Barney A. Sarecky	January 21, 1954
Pancho's nephew is the witness to a murder and identifies the killer, who is arrested. The circuit judge who arrives for the trial, however, is actually one of the killer's friends, impersonating the real judge in an effort to free his buddy.
96	18	"Rodeo"	Eddie Davis	Roy Engel & Ed Gardner	January 28, 1954
A confidence man solicits entry fees to a sham rodeo. Pancho is among the many would-be participants to be fooled by the scam.
97	19	"Marriage by Mail"	Eddie Davis	Buckley Angell	February 4, 1954
98	20	"The Iron Mask"	Lew Landers	Donn Mullally	February 11, 1954
99	21	"Double Deal"	Eddie Davis	Fred Leighton	February 18, 1954
In order to exact revenge against Cisco for having once put him in jail, a man commits a gold shipment holdup while disguised as Cisco.
100	22	"Horseless Carriage"	Paul Landres	Barry Cohon & David Nowinson	February 25, 1954
Pancho's nephew buys a new "horseless carriage," but finds himself in trouble when thieves use it as a getaway vehicle after they've robbed the bank.
101	23	"The Steel Plow"	Eddie Davis	George Callahan	March 4, 1954
102	24	"The Ventriloquist"	Lambert Hillyer	Barry Cohon & Roy Hamilton	March 11, 1954
Pancho learns how to throw his voice. Meanwhile, Cisco deals with a crooked assayer.
103	25	"Powder Trail"	Eddie Davis	George Callahan	March 18, 1954
104	26	"Cisco Plays the Ghost"	Lew Landers	Warren Wilson	March 25, 1954

=== Season 5 (1954–55) ===
No. overall	No. in season	Title	Directed by	Written by	Original release date
105	1	"Six-Gun for No-Pain"	Lambert Hillyer	Barney A. Sarecky	September 25, 1954
106	2	"The Haunted Stage Stop"	Lambert Hillyer	Robert Clayton	October 2, 1954
107	3	"Gold Strike"	Eddie Davis	Ande Lamb	October 9, 1954
108	4	"Trouble in Tonopah"	Lambert Hillyer	Oliver Drake	October 16, 1954
109	5	"Harry the Heir"	Lambert Hillyer	Robert Clayton	October 23, 1954
110	6	"The Lowest Bidder"	Lambert Hillyer	Ande Lamb	October 30, 1954
111	7	"Mining Madness"	Lambert Hillyer	Gerald Geraghty	November 6, 1954
112	8	"Sundown's Gun"	Lambert Hillyer	Wilbur S. Peacock	November 13, 1954
113	9	"Pot of Gold"	Lambert Hillyer	Wilbur S. Peacock	November 20, 1954
114	10	"Caution of Curley Thompson"	Eddie Davis	Barry Cohon	November 27, 1954
115	11	"Fool's Gold"	Lambert Hillyer	Gerald Geraghty	December 4, 1954
116	12	"The Hospital"	Lambert Hillyer	Wilbur S. Peacock	December 11, 1954
117	13	"Three Suspects"	Lambert Hillyer	Kenneth A. Enochs	December 18, 1954
118	14	"Pancho's Niece"	Lambert Hillyer	Barry Cohon	December 25, 1954
119	15	"Extradition Papers"	Lambert Hillyer	Kenneth A. Enochs	January 1, 1955
Pancho breaks in a new pair of boots.
120	16	"New Evidence"	Lambert Hillyer	Ande Lamb	January 8, 1955
A local judge enlists Cisco and Pancho as marshal and bailiff to capture and try a murder suspect.
121	17	"Doorway to Nowhere"	Lambert Hillyer	Robert Clayton	January 15, 1955
The bedroom of a house mysteriously disappears.
122	18	"Stolen River"	Lambert Hillyer	Barry Cohon	January 22, 1955
123	19	"Son of a Gunman"	Lambert Hillyer	Hendrik Vollaerts	January 29, 1955
124	20	"Juggler's Silver"	Lambert Hillyer	Barry Cohon	February 3, 1955
125	21	"The Kidnapped Cameraman"	Lambert Hillyer	Barry Cohon	February 10, 1955
A photographer takes a picture of a murder. The killer and his brother go after him.
126	22	"Cisco and the Giant"	Lambert Hillyer	William George	February 17, 1955
127	23	"Montezuma's Treasure"	Lambert Hillyer	Wilbur S. Peacock	February 24, 1955
128	24	"Vendetta"	Lambert Hillyer	J. Benton Cheney & Ande Lamb	March 3, 1955
129	25	"The Two-Wheeler"	Lambert Hillyer	Barry Cohon	March 10, 1955
130	26	"The Tumblers"	Leslie Goodwins	Otto Englander & Harry S. Franklin	March 17, 1955
There's a new sheriff in town, and he happens to be a gymnast.

=== Season 6 (1955–56) ===
No. overall	No. in season	Title	Directed by	Written by	Original release date
131	1	"A Quiet Sunday Morning"	Leslie Goodwins	Barry Cohon & Barney A. Sarecky	October 6, 1955
132	2	"Arroyo Millionaire's Castle"	Lambert Hillyer	Barry Cohon	October 13, 1955
Cisco and Pancho stumble on a gold theft, before they can do anything the local sheriff also arrives. He decides Cisco is the real thief and intends to put before the courts.
133	3	"Witness"	Leslie Goodwins	Kenneth A. Enochs	October 20, 1955
Pancho is shot after interrupting a holdup, but he finds time is on his side.
134	4	"Choctaw Justice"	Unknown	Unknown	October 27, 1955
135	5	"New York's Finest"	Leslie Goodwins	John W. Krafft	November 3, 1955
136	6	"Cisco and the Tappers"	Lambert Hillyer	Wilbur S. Peacock	November 3, 1955
Cisco and Pancho help a sheriff and his young deputy to capture a gang of outlaws who tap into the telegraph wires to learn when shipments of gold will occur.
137	7	"Young Blood"	Leslie Goodwins	Kenneth A. Enochs	November 10, 1955
138	8	"School Marm"	Lambert Hillyer	Barry Cohon & Barney A. Sarecky	November 17, 1955
Madera's new schoolteacher has been kidnapped and is being held for ransom.
139	9	"Bounty Men"	Leslie Goodwins	Ande Lamb	November 24, 1955
140	10	"Quick on the Trigger"	Lambert Hillyer	Barry Cohon & Barney A. Sarecky	December 1, 1955
141	11	"Gold, Death and Dynamite"	Lambert Hillyer	Barry Cohon & Barney A. Sarecky	December 8, 1955
142	12	"Jumping Beans"	Leslie Goodwins	Jack Rock	December 15, 1955
143	13	"Ambush"	Lambert Hillyer	Barry Cohon & Stuart Jerome	December 22, 1955
144	14	"Six Gun Cupids"	Lambert Hillyer	Buckley Angell	December 29, 1955
145	15	"Strangers"	Lambert Hillyer	Donn Mullally	January 5, 1956
146	16	"The Joker"	Leslie Goodwins	Barry Cohon & Barney A. Sarecky	January 12, 1956
147	17	"Man with the Reputation"	Lambert Hillyer	Ande Lamb	January 19, 1956
148	18	"The Epidemic"	Leslie Goodwins	Kenneth A. Enochs	January 26, 1956
149	19	"Mr. X"	Lambert Hillyer	Barry Cohon & Barney A. Sarecky	February 2, 1956
150	20	"Roundup"	Leslie Goodwins	Barry Cohon & Barney A. Sarecky	February 9, 1956
151	21	"He Couldn't Quit"	Leslie Goodwins	Ande Lamb	February 16, 1956
152	22	"Kilts and Sombreros"	Lambert Hillyer	Kenneth A. Enochs	February 23, 1956
153	23	"West of the Law"	Leslie Goodwins	Buckley Angell	March 1, 1956
154	24	"Dangerous Shoemaker"	Lambert Hillyer	Ed Gardner	March 8, 1956
155	25	"Magician of Jamesville"	Leslie Goodwins	Larry Lund	March 15, 1956
156	26	"Tangled Trails"	Leslie Goodwins	J. Benton Cheney	March 22, 1956

== Home releases ==
At present, the following DVD sets — each of which consists of a selection of random episodes, rather than a whole season — have been released by MPI Home Video.

DVD set	Episodes	Release date
The Cisco Kid: Collection 1	20	30 March 2004
The Cisco Kid: Collection 2	20	25 May 2004
The Cisco Kid: Collection 3	20	27 July 2004
