= The Cisco Kid (TV series) =

American television series

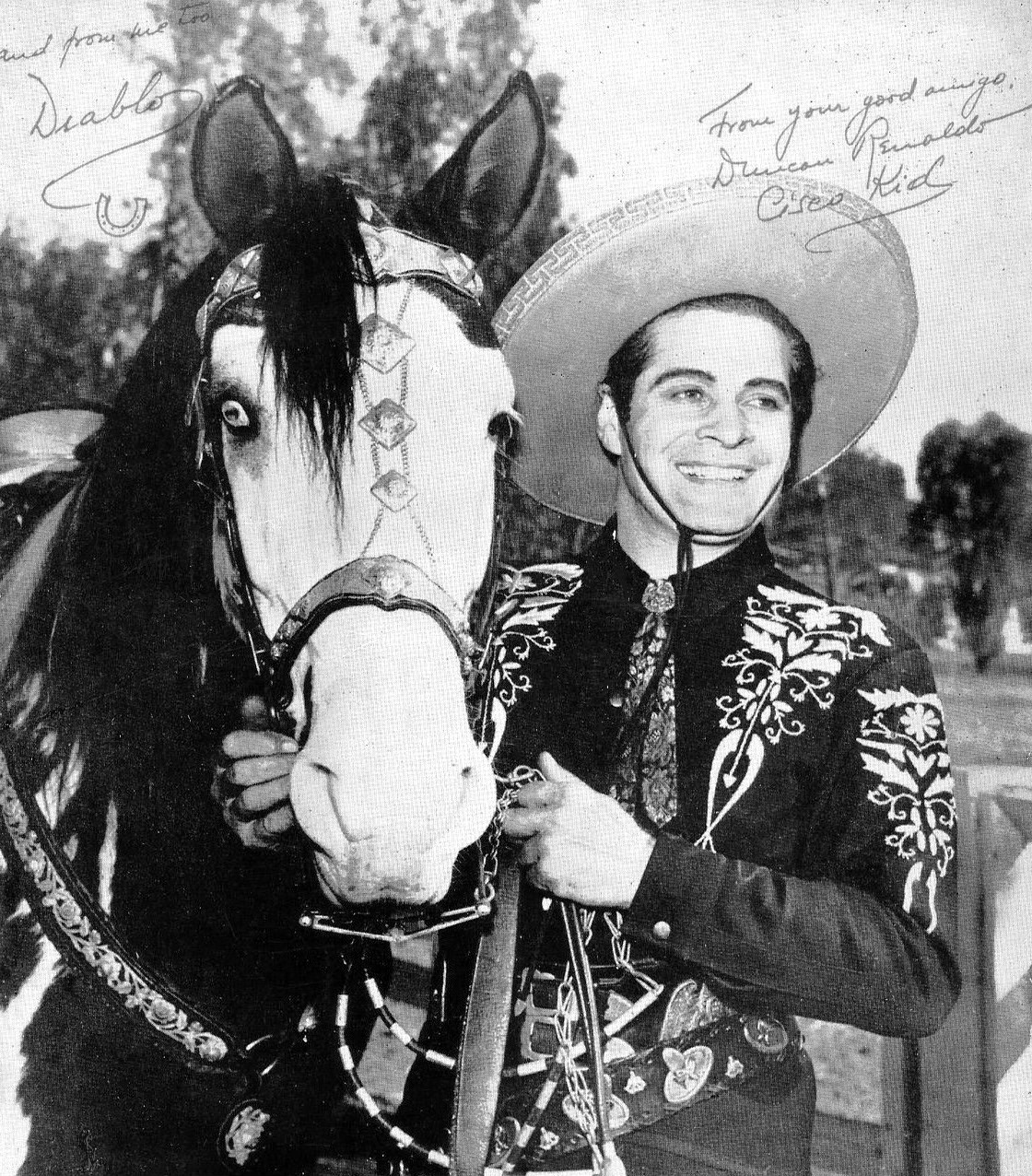
- Duncan Renaldo as the Cisco Kid, with Diablo
- Genre: Western
- Written by: O. Henry; J. Benton Cheney; Barry Cohon
- Directed by: Paul Landres; Lambert Hillyer
- Starring: Duncan Renaldo; Leo Carrillo
- Country of origin: United States
- Original language: English
- No. of seasons: 6
- No. of episodes: 156 (list of episodes)

Production
- Producers: Frederick Ziv; Philip N. Krasne
- Running time: 30 minutes
- Production company: Ziv Television Programs

Original release
- Network: First-run syndication
- Release: September 5, 1950 – March 22, 1956

The Cisco Kid is a 1950–1956 half-hour American Western television series starring Duncan Renaldo in the title role, the Cisco Kid, and Leo Carrillo as the jovial sidekick, Pancho. The series was syndicated to individual stations and was popular with children. Cisco and Pancho were technically desperados wanted for unspecified crimes, but were viewed by the poor as Robin Hood figures who assisted the downtrodden when law enforcement officers proved corrupt or unwilling to help. It was also the first television series to be filmed in color, although few viewers saw it in color until the 1960s.

The 156 half-hour episodes were filmed between 1950 and 1956. The show was never run as a network series and was instead sold to local stations. During the series' initial run, it was seen on 78 stations in the United States. In 1956, the series was dubbed into foreign languages and distributed to 20 countries, including France, Italy, Switzerland, Luxembourg, Belgium, Cuba, Puerto Rico, Argentina, and the Dominican Republic.

== Synopsis ==
The Cisco Kid was a charming ladies' man, dressed in a highly embroidered black outfit, and his sidekick Pancho brought humor to the series with his heavily accented comments. Duncan Renaldo said of Leo Carrillo playing Pancho: "His accent was so exaggerated that when we finished a picture, no one in the cast or crew could talk normal English any more." The Cisco Kid rode a horse named Diablo, and Pancho rode Loco.

== Cast ==
- Duncan Renaldo as the Cisco Kid
- Leo Carrillo as Pancho, Cisco's sidekick

== Episodes ==
Season	Episodes	Originally released	
Season	Episodes	First released	Last released
1	26	September 5, 1950	February 20, 1951
2	26	September 3, 1951	February 19, 1952
3	26	August 3, 1952	March 8, 1953
4	26	October 1, 1953	March 25, 1954
5	26	September 25, 1954	March 17, 1955
6	26	October 6, 1955	March 22, 1956

== Production ==
Little gunplay was used in the series; Cisco usually shot the gun out of the villain's hand, and Pancho often disarmed the bad guys using a bullwhip. Plenty of action occurred in the series, and Renaldo often did his own stunts, which resulted in several injuries. In one episode, Renaldo was to dodge a 65-pound papier-mâché boulder, which struck him in the head, breaking two neck vertebrae. He was paralyzed for two months.

Most of the series' location work was done at Pioneertown, California.
