= Jane Ace =

American actress (1897–1974)

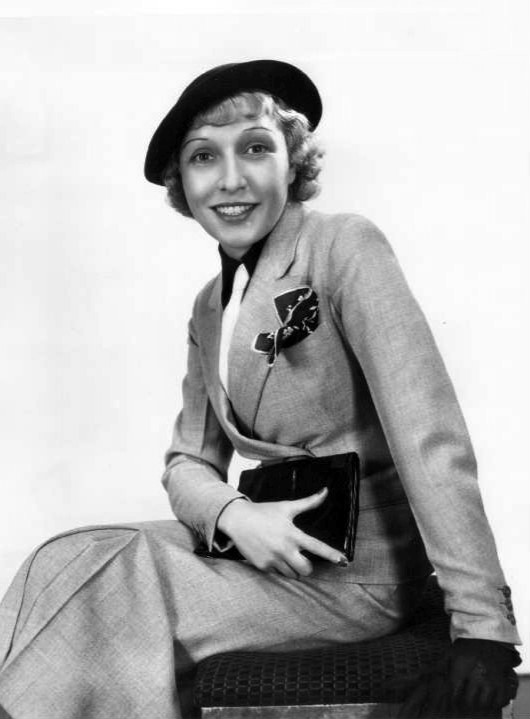
- Jane Ace on Easy Aces, 1935
- Born: Jane Epstein; October 12, 1897; Kansas City, Missouri, U.S.
- Died: November 11, 1974 (aged 77); New York City, U.S.
- Spouse: Goodman Ace
- Career
- Show: Easy Aces (radio and television) mr. ace and JANE; Jane Ace, Disk Jockey; Monitor; Weekday
- Station: KMBC
- Network: CBS; DuMont; NBC

Jane Ace (born Jane Epstein; October 12, 1897 – November 11, 1974) was an American radio actress and comedian best-known for her role in the radio comedy Easy Aces. She starred in the program alongside her husband Goodman Ace, who was also the show's creator and writer. She was known for her high-pitched voice and use of witty malapropisms, many of which became part of American vernacular.

== Early years ==
Born as Jane Epstein in Kansas City, Missouri, she met Goodman Ace while both attended the same Kansas City high school and Goodman, hoping to make a writing career, edited the school newspaper. In due course, he became a movie critic and columnist for the Kansas City Journal-Post.

After Goodman became a newspaper reporter, he was able to get passes for various shows. Jane wanted to attend Al Jolson's Kansas City show, but none of her boyfriends could get tickets to the sold-out performance. Ace got his first date with Jane because of his press pass; it enabled him to take Jane to the sold out Jolson show. Jane's father, Jacob Epstein, a Kansas City clothing store owner, had hoped for a son-in-law who would be an asset to his business; after learning that Ace was in the newspaper business, his comment was, "Where's your newsstand?"

The couple married in 1922; soon after they were married, Ace lost his reporter's job. The Aces found they could forget their worries when playing bridge. Ace was hired by the Kansas City Journal-Post as its drama critic. They caught their big break a few years later, while Goodman gave his witty reviews once a week on Kansas City radio station KMBC as well. One night in 1930, the show following his slot failed to feed, and Ace had to fill the 15 minutes' air time. He invited Jane—who'd accompanied him to the studio that night—to join him on the air chatting about a murder case that had broken locally and a bridge game they played the previous weekend. The couple's witty impromptu (Jane: "Would you like to shoot a game of bridge, dear?") provoked such a response that the station invited them to develop their own domestic comedy.

== Radio days ==
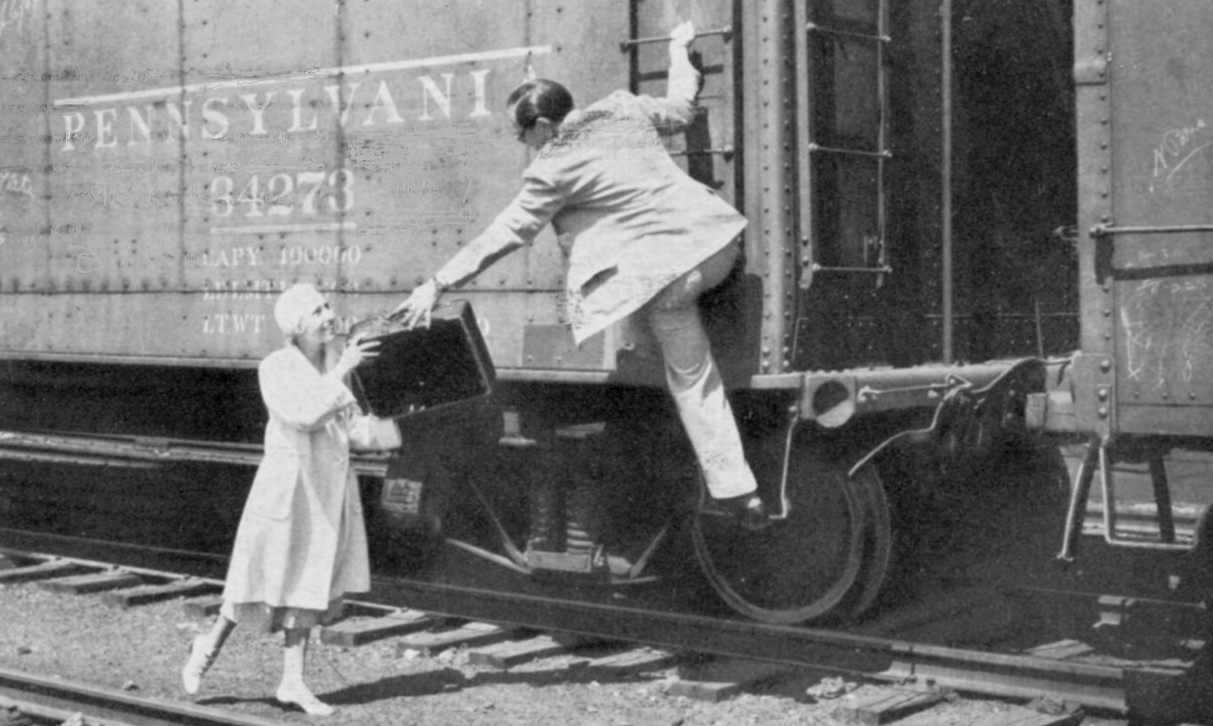
Listener postcard from Easy Aces sponsor, Lavoris, about new episodes of the program beginning September 26, 1932. The couple appears to be returning from vacation by freight train.

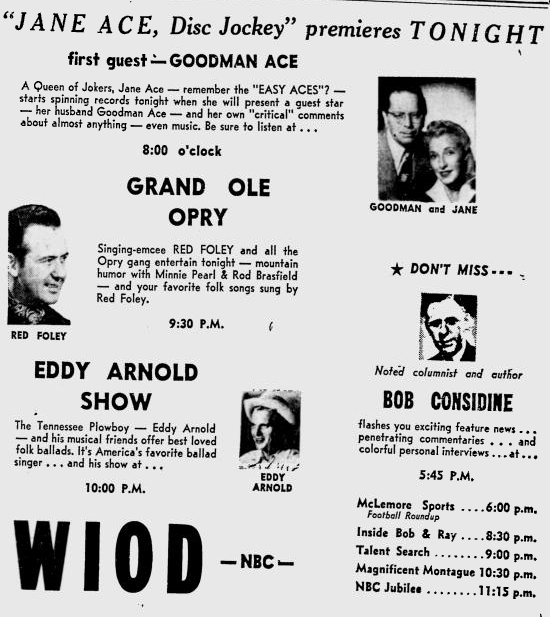
Premiere of "Jane Ace, Disk Jockey", October 27, 1951.

Conceived and written by Goodman Ace, Easy Aces graduated within two years from a strictly local show to a network offering (first from Chicago, then from New York). When the program was still at KMBC on a local level, the couple was contacted by a sponsor offering to bring them to Chicago for a network show on a trial basis. If the ratings for the show were good, the sponsor promised to then begin paying them salaries. Ace thought it was a wonderful offer, but Jane did not, saying that if the sponsor considered their show good enough for a network, it was also good enough for a salary. She went on to say that they needed $500 per week for their services and no less; the sponsor honored all of Jane's demands.

Goodman played himself as a put-upon realtor, and Jane played "his awfully-wedded wife" (and used the name Sherwood as her on-air character's maiden name) with an endearing mixture of sweet-natured meddlesomeness and language mangling. Her husband once swore that she was a natural malapropper, but in radio character Jane became the unchallenged mistress of the kind of malaprops that (unlike Gracie Allen's "illogical logic") substituted words in seemingly ordinary phrasing and still made perverse sense, after a fashion. Comical dialog ensued. The Aces signed with Educational Pictures to make Easy Aces two reel comedies in 1934. Dumb Luck made its debut January 18, 1935, with the couple on the screen in their radio roles.

Many years after Easy Aces ended, Goodman Ace revealed his wife had never had acting experience before the show. The Aces tried a short-lived, expanded revival on CBS Radio in 1948, known as mr. ace and JANE, before trying a television version of the original Easy Aces style on the DuMont Television Network from December 1949 to June 1950.

While doing Easy Aces, Jane was offered other radio roles in addition to the one on the couple's show. A radio producer wanted her to play the lead in a production of Dulcy, but she declined, reportedly believing she was unable to play other roles, because she did not consider the radio work she did as acting. Jane Ace sought no further acting work after the show ended at last, mostly retiring to a quiet life, except for a brief spell as what her husband described (in a 1952 essay) as "a comedienne now making her come-down as a disc jockey." Jane came out of retirement to join her husband as an NBC Radio Monitor "Communicator" when the show premiered in 1955. The Aces were hired for the spot just after Dave Garroway's participation in the program was announced.

The couple was also part of the NBC Radio Weekday show which made its debut not long after Monitor. It aired Monday through Friday, and was intended to reach female radio listeners. They also began writing and performing in commercials. Husband Goodman continued a second career as a radio and television writer and regular essayist for Saturday Review, and his writings for that magazine frequently referenced Jane's doings, undoings, sayings, and unsayings.

== Death ==
Jane Ace died in New York City in 1974 from cancer, aged 77. Goodman Ace composed a eulogy in a Saturday Review column:

Now alone at a funeral home ... the questions ... the softly spoken suggestions ... repeated, and repeated ... because... because during all the arrangements, through my mind there ran a constant rerun, a line she spoke on radio ... on the brotherhood of man ... in her casual, malapropian style ... "we are all cremated equal" ... they kept urging for an answer ... a wooden casket?... a metal casket?... it's the name of their game ... a tisket, a casket ... and then transporting it to Kansas City, Missouri ... the plane ride ... "smoking or non-smoking section?" somebody asked... the non-thinking section was what I wanted ... a soft sprinkle of snow as we huddled around her ... the first of the season, they told me ... lasted only through the short service ... snow stopped the instant the last words were spoken. He had the grace to celebrate her arrival with a handful of His confetti ...

That eulogy provoked hundreds of letters from current readers and old radio fans alike. With several hundred episodes of Easy Aces now circulating among old-time radio collectors (episodes the Aces syndicated through the Frederick W. Ziv Company in 1945), Jane Ace has been discovered by fans who weren't even alive before her own death. The National Radio Hall of Fame helped make sure of that, inducting Easy Aces and its co-stars in 1990.

== Jane-isms ==
- Home wasn't built in a day.
- Congress is still in season.
- You could have knocked me down with a fender.
- Up at the crank of dawn.
- Time wounds all heels.
- Now, there's no use crying over spoiled milk.
- I'm completely uninhabited.
- Seems like only a year ago they were married nine years!
- I am his awfully-wedded wife.
- I've always wanted to see my name up in tights.
- He blew up higher than a hall.
- I look like the wrath of grapes.
- I wasn't under the impersonation you meant me.
- He shot out of here like a bat out of a belfry.
- He has me sitting on pins and cushions waiting.
- The coffee will be ready in a jitney.
- This hangnail expression...
- I'm a member of the weeper sex.
- I don't drink, I'm a totalitarian.
- Well, you've got to take the bitter with the batter.
- The way things are these days, a girl's gotta play hard to take.
