= Mary Hunter Wolf =

- Born: Mary Charlotte Hunter; December 4, 1904; Bakersfield, California, U.S.
- Died: November 3, 2000 (aged 95); Hamden, Connecticut, U.S.
- Occupations: Theatre director and producer
- Relatives: Mary Hunter Austin (aunt)

Mary Hunter Wolf (December 4, 1904 – November 3, 2000), born Mary Charlotte Hunter, was an American theater director and producer. She was co-founder and executive director of the American Shakespeare Theatre, and "a leading advocate for the arts in Connecticut."

== Early life and education ==
Hunter was born in Bakersfield, California, the daughter of James Milo Hunter and Mary Hutchins Hunter. Her mother died soon after giving birth to Mary; her father died in 1917. Her aunt was the novelist Mary Hunter Austin, and through Austin she met Willa Cather, D. H. Lawrence, and others in the Santa Fe literary community of the 1920s. She and Agnes de Mille were friends and classmates at the Hollywood School for Girls. She attended but did not graduate from Wellesley College. She also attended the University of Chicago.

== Career ==
Hunter was a voice actor on the radio program Easy Aces from 1931 to 1945. She directed several shows at the Cube Theater in Chicago. In 1938, she co-founded the American Actors Company with Andrius Jilinsky. She made her Broadway directorial debut on in April 1944 at the Bijou Theater, with Only the Heart, the first play written by Horton Foote.

Hunter was director of the initial 1954 Broadway production of Jerome Robbins' version of Peter Pan, now the standard version on the American stage. Other stage credits included directing Carib Song (1945), Out of Dust by Lynn Riggs, Ballet Ballads, Great to be Alive! (1950), The Respectful Prostitute by Jean-Paul Sartre, and Ungilded Lily by Vina Delmar. When Hunter was replaced as director of High Button Shoes in 1947, she sued on the grounds of sex discrimination. The New York Supreme Court agreed with her, in its ruling on the case.

Hunter was founding executive director of the American Shakespeare Theatre in Stratford, Connecticut. She also created the Professional Training Program of the American Theatre Wing, and in 1966 she founded the Center for Theatre Techniques in Education (CTTE), in Connecticut.

== Personal life ==
Hunter married widower Herman Wolf in 1955. They divorced in 1965. She lived in Anchorage, Alaska, in her later years. She died in 2000, at the age of 95, at her home in Hamden, Connecticut. Her papers, including her correspondence with Tennessee Williams and Jerome Robbins, are in the Beinecke Library at Yale University.
