= Goodman Ace =

American screenwriter (1899–1982)

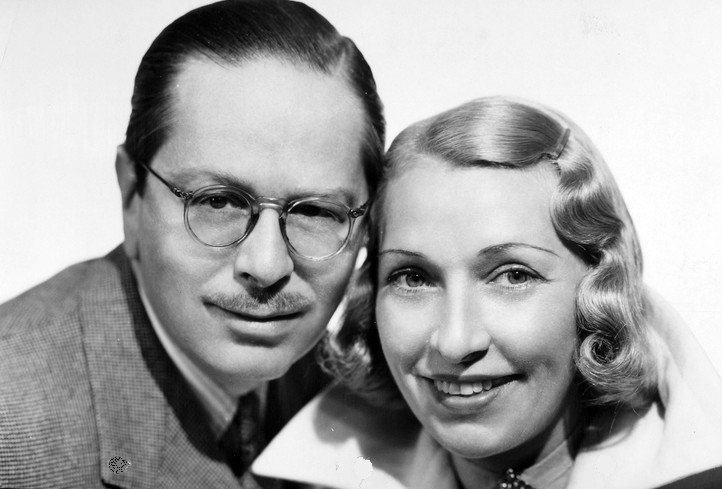
- Goodman and Jane Ace, 1938.
- Born: Goodman Aiskowitz; January 15, 1899; Kansas City, Missouri, U.S.
- Died: March 25, 1982 (aged 83); New York City, U.S.
- Spouse: Jane Epstein
- Presenting career
- Show: Ace Goes To the Movies; Easy Aces (radio and television); Mr. Ace and Jane; Monitor; Weekday; You Are There; Jane Ace, Disk Jockey (writer); The Danny Kaye Show (writer); The Milton Berle Show (writer); The Texaco Star Theater (writer); The Big Show (writer); The Texaco Star Theater (television writer); The Perry Como Show (television writer); Perry Como's Kraft Music Hall (television writer)
- Stations: KMBC; WPAT
- Network: CBS; NBC; DuMont; National Public Radio

Goodman Ace (January 15, 1899 – March 25, 1982), born Goodman Aiskowitz, was an American humorist, radio writer and comedian, television writer, and magazine columnist.

Ace developed a subtle, literate comedic style marked by gentle satire of contemporary trends and social pretensions. He worked as a writer in radio and television from the 1930s through the 1960s.

== Early years ==
Born in Kansas City, Missouri, the son of Latvian Jewish immigrants Harry Aiskowitz, who worked as a haberdasher, and Anna Katzen, Ace grew up wanting to write, and as the editor of his high school newspaper, he took on his first nom de plume, Asa Goodman. Ace worked as a roller skating messenger for Montgomery Ward while he studied journalism at Kansas City Polytechnic Institute. He also wrote a weekly column called "The Dyspeptic" for the school's newspaper. After working at the post office and a local haberdashery to support his mother and sisters after his father's death, he became a reporter and columnist for the Kansas City ''Journal-Post''.

Jane Epstein was his high school sweetheart. Jane wanted to attend the sold-out performance of Al Jolson in Kansas City; her boyfriends were unable to get tickets, but Ace had access to the concert via his press pass. The Jolson concert was the couple's first date; they married six months later, in 1922.

== Radio aces ==
In 1930, Ace took on a second job reading the Sunday comics on radio station KMBC (anticipating the famous newspaper strike stunt, almost two decades later, by legendary New York mayor Fiorello H. La Guardia) and hosting a Friday night film review and gossip program called Ace Goes to the Movies. Ace was not initially a volunteer for the job. An editor at the Journal-Post had the idea that having an employee read the newspaper's comics on the air for children would increase circulation for the paper. Taking the job meant an extra $10 per week in one's paycheck, but none of the newsroom staff was interested. The editor, reasoning that since Ace's current assignment was covering local theater he would be the perfect man for the job, insisted he take it. Ace suggested a second radio show, this one dealing with films, thus collecting an additional $10 per week.

But one night the recorded fifteen-minute show scheduled to air after Ace's timeslot failed to feed. With an immediate need to fill fifteen minutes' more airtime and his wife having accompanied him to the station that night, Ace slipped into an impromptu chat about a bridge game the couple played the previous weekend and invited Jane to join the chat which soon enough included discussion of a local murder case in which a wife murdered her husband over an argument about bridge. Loaded with Goodman's wry wit and Jane's knack for malaprops ("Would you care to shoot a game of bridge, dear?"), the couple's surprise improvisation provoked a response enthusiastic enough to convince KMBC to hand them a regular fifteen-minute slot, creating and performing a "domestic comedy" of their own.

At first, the show that became known as Easy Aces centered around the couple's bridge playing, according to John Dunning in On the Air: The Encyclopedia of Old-Time Radio (New York: Oxford University Press, 1998): "Ace was not wild about Jane's bridge game, on the air or off, and he kept picking at her until she lost her temper and threatened to quit. The show settled into a new niche, a more universally based domestic comedy revolving around Jane's improbable situations and her impossible turns of phrase."

Written by Goodman Ace, who cast himself as a real estate salesman and the husband of the scatterbrained, malaprop-prone Jane ("You've got to take the bitter with the better"; "Time wounds all heels"), Easy Aces became a long-running serial comedy (1930–1945) and known in old-time radio for its conversational style and the malaprops of the female half of the team. The show was never a rating blockbuster, but according to Dunning it "was always a favorite of Radio Row insiders. Like Fred Allen and Henry Morgan, Ace was considered a wit. His show limped along [but] . . . lasted across several formats for more than fifteen years and was one of radio's fondest memories." The radio show was popular enough to get to the big screen; in 1934, the couple signed with Educational Pictures for some two-reel comedies. Dumb Luck was released 18 January 1935, with Goodman and Jane playing their radio characters. While writing Easy Aces, Ace also wrote for other radio shows, earning $3,000 per week in this way.

During World War II, he participated in the selection of music for the War Department's Hit Kit songbook series as part of a carefully selected group of writers, composers, and show business personalities known collectively as the "Committee of 25".

In 1945, Ace signed on as one of the writers of The Danny Kaye Show. Previously he and Jane had been part of a series of celebrity guests who filled in for Kaye while he entertained the armed forces troops who were overseas. When Kaye moved his show from New York to Hollywood, Ace resigned. Whether writing for himself and Jane or for another performer, Ace's rating system of how well a script would do was based on the number of cigars he smoked while writing it. One cigar meant the show would do very well, while four cigars meant this program or episode was most likely hopeless. Ace was sued in 1940 because of the name he selected for a character. He used the first name of one of his staff coupled with the last name of another. Unknown to Ace, this resulted in the name of a real person who was publicly embarrassed by the use of his name on the show. He then began the practice of having those on the program use their own names for their characters.

In 1948, Ace created a new, half-hour version of the show, mr. ace and JANE; this expanded version, perhaps because a live studio audience detracted from its quiet style (a point made especially vivid by its audience-less, quiet audition show, and when new episodes expanded upon some of the old show's vintages), didn't last beyond a single season. And it fared no better on television. In 1956, both Ace and NBC thought seriously enough about another try for the television series to announce Ernie Kovacs and his wife Edie Adams would play the Aces in a pilot for the show; it is unknown whether the pilot took place.

The husband and wife team returned to network radio with the debut of NBC's Monitor; the Aces were announced as "Communicators" just after Dave Garroway's joining the show. They were also part of NBC Radio's Weekday, which was a Monday through Friday network offering aimed at women that premiered not long after Monitor. Ace branched out by writing commercials, featuring himself and Jane. The couple also voiced some commercials used on NBC's Startime, while other actors played the visual roles.

In 1951 Ace was quoted by the syndicated gossip columnist Walter Winchell as giving a quipping pun review of, "No Leica" to the play I Am a Camera. This has been erroneously attributed to critics such as Walter Kerr and C. A. Lejeune, the playwright Jean Kerr, and others, often in the form "Me no Leica."

== "Terrible Vaudeville" and You Are There ==
Ace needled television in a 1953 letter to Groucho Marx: "...TV—a clever contraction derived from the words Terrible Vaudeville. However, it is our latest medium—we call it a medium because nothing's well done." Nonetheless, he hadn't been averse to giving television a try.

Goodman and Jane Ace adapted Easy Aces to television in December 1949, with a fifteen-minute filmed version on the DuMont network (also syndicated in some areas through Ziv Television Programs) that ended in mid-June 1950, after airing Wednesday nights from 7:45–8:00 p.m. "As on radio," authors Tim Brooks and Earle Marsh wrote, "Ace was his witty, intelligent self, and his wife, Jane, was a charming bundle of malapropisms". The television show included Betty Garde as Jane Ace's friend, Dorothy. What it didn't include was an audience equal to the ones who kept Easy Aces on radio for all those years. The demise of the show also meant the demise of the Aces' career in front of a microphone or camera. Jane Ace retired almost completely; Goodman retired as a performer, becoming for the most part a writer from 1949 onward.

Ace did have a serious side, too, and he melded it to his sense of the absurd to create a radio show with the twist of taking listeners to re-created historical events described by actual CBS News reporters. The problem, as revealed by CBS historian Robert Metz (in CBS: Reflections in a Bloodshot Eye), was that Ace didn't get official credit for his creation for many years; a CBS executive vice president named Desmond Taylor gained the original credit for the show born on radio as CBS Was There and famed (especially on television, with future anchor Walter Cronkite narrating) for its introduction, which leapt into the American vernacular: "All things are as they were then, except you... are... there!"

== "You Gentlemen, The Authors" ==
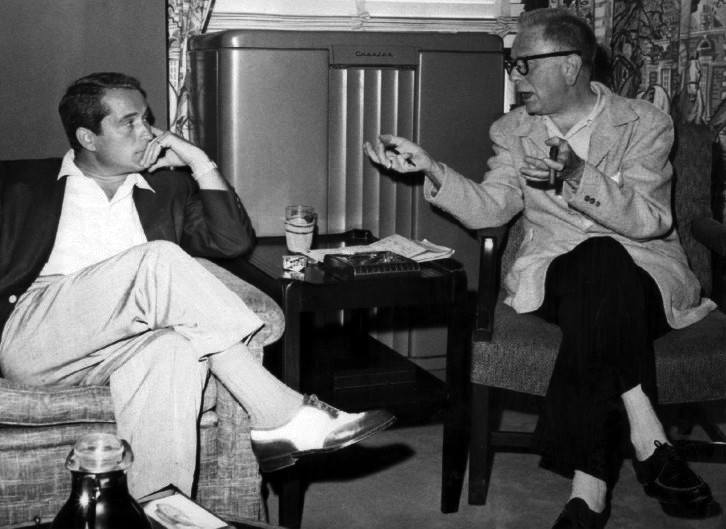
Ace and Perry Como confer before the start of The Perry Como Show on 17 September 1955.

By this time, however, Ace began writing for other performers, including Milton Berle, Perry Como, Danny Kaye, Robert Q. Lewis, and Bob Newhart. He was nominated for Emmy Awards twice during his term as Como's head writer, in 1956 and 1959. Ace rationalized his work by saying, "I'm not in television. I'm with Perry Como." Perhaps his best turn of writing in these years, however, was his collaboration with Frank Wilson on The Big Show, considered NBC's last-gasp attempt to keep classic radio alive. This 90-minute variety program was hosted by Tallulah Bankhead and featured a rotating cast that included some of America's and the world's greatest entertainers, including Fred Allen, Groucho Marx, Jimmy Durante, Joan Davis, Bob Hope, Louis Armstrong, George Jessel, Ethel Merman, José Ferrer, Ed Wynn, Lauritz Melchior, Ezio Pinza, Édith Piaf, Ginger Rogers, Ethel Barrymore, Phil Silvers, Benny Goodman, and Danny Thomas. The show was marked by Ace's wry style, adapted to Bankhead's diva-blunt style. Ace said years later that one of his secrets was isolating particular interests of the guests – for example, Ginger Rogers' passion for playing golf – and writing comic routines around those interests.

Ace fondly remembered working with Bankhead in later years. "'You gentlemen, the authors,' she would say", he once told author Robert Metz, "we gag writers felt pretty good about that." What he didn't necessarily feel good about, as he told radio interviewers Richard Lamparski and John Dunning two decades later, was the writers' non-mention in Bankhead's memoir recollection about The Big Show.

Ace had known Jack Benny since his Kansas City years. Radio historian Arthur Frank Wertheim recorded (in Radio Comedy) that, as a young newspaper reporter and columnist, Ace had written a witty gossip column that moved Benny himself to ask the young writer for some jokes for his stage act. Benny asked for more and paid Ace $50 for one packet of jokes. "Your jokes got lots of laughs", said the note Benny sent with the check. "If you have any more, send them along". According to Wertheim, Ace returned the check with a note: "Your check got lots of laughs. If you have any more, send them along". He ended up supplying Benny with gags "on the house" for years, Wertheim noted.

Benny was inadvertently responsible for a very funny exchange of letters between Ace and the owner of the Stork Club, Sherman Billingsley. Benny invited Ace to lunch at the Stork; when Ace got to the club, Benny had not yet arrived. The staff at the Stork Club did not recognize Ace and he received a very cool reception. When Benny finally did get to the Stork, he was told Ace didn't want to wait and left. Soon Billingsley's notes began to arrive in Ace's mailbox, inviting him to come to the club for the marvelous air conditioning. Ace wrote back that he was well aware of how cool it was at the Stork, having received the cold shoulder there. Billingsley's response was a gift—bow ties for Ace, whose reply was to ask Billingsley for some matching socks so he would be well-dressed when he was refused admittance again.

Ace wrote one screenplay, I Married a Woman, in 1957. Calling it the best thing he had ever written, but the worst thing he had ever seen after viewing the film, he never tried his hand at screenwriting again. When the couple's Miami hotel room was robbed in 1966, Ace managed to find humor in the situation.

Ace revealed in the mid-1960s that CBS once developed a kind of school for young comedy writers, with Ace himself "placed in charge of a group of six or seven young writers who wanted to make all that easy money", as he recalled in a later magazine column. All became television writers and two eventually became successful playwrights: George Axelrod (The Seven Year Itch) and Neil Simon (Barefoot in the Park, The Odd Couple, The Goodbye Girl).

== The Saturday Reviewer ==
Ace became a regular columnist for Saturday Review (formerly The Saturday Review of Literature; he liked to suggest cause-and-effect in the magazine's name changing two weeks after his debut in its pages) in the early 1950s. At first, he focused—in what a publisher described (considering his parallel employment writing for television) as "nibbling the hand that feeds him"—on television criticism in his usual droll style; a collection of this criticism was published in 1955 as The Book of Little Knowledge: More Than You Want to Know About Television.

Later, Ace shifted to more broad contemporary concerns and called the column "Top of My Head"; these essays became as well-read as his old radio show had been, without being either too frivolous or too overbearing. Sometimes, they were gentle; sometimes, they were more tart, always they were without genuine malice. Often they included his beloved Jane, and they were strongly enough received to provoke two published collections, The Fine Art of Hypochondria; or, How Are You? and The Better of Goodman Ace.

As if suggesting that radio had never really left him, Ace assembled and published a collection of eight complete Easy Aces scripts, with new essays and comments from the Aces, as Ladies and Gentlemen – Easy Aces in 1970. He also held a small regular slot offering witty commentaries on New York station WPAT for a time, before going out over the full National Public Radio network during the 1970s.

Also around that time, two decades after the brief, unsuccessful television adaptation of Easy Aces, someone else was willing to give the concept a fresh television try: a number of the original Easy Aces radio scripts were adapted for the Canadian CTV Television Network show The Trouble with Tracy in 1970. However, though 130 episodes of this series were produced (all in 1970/71), and the show was re-run well into the 1980s on Canadian TV, The Trouble With Tracy was regarded as an almost unqualified disaster on a creative level. This had less to do with the scripts, however, and more with the incredible cheapness of the production. Seven episodes were filmed every five days on wobbly sets, with almost no time for rehearsal for either the actors or the technical crew—flubbed lines and bloopers sometimes ended up airing in finished episodes, because the show could not afford retakes. Ultimately, The Trouble With Tracy is often cited, especially in Canada, as the worst sitcom ever made. Note, though, that while Ace had a hand in the modern adaptation of the scripts, neither he nor Jane Ace appeared in it, and neither played any part in the actual production of the series.

Jane Ace died after a long illness in 1974, just days before what would have been their fiftieth wedding anniversary. Her husband's tribute to her in the 8 February 1975 issue ("Jane") provoked hundreds of letters from his regular readers and from the couple's old radio fans.

"...now alone at a funeral home...the questions...the softly spoken suggestions...repeated, and repeated... because ...because during all the arrangements, through my mind there ran a constant rerun, a line she spoke on radio...on the brotherhood of man ...in her casual, malapropian style ... "we are all cremated equal" ... they kept urging for an answer...a wooden casket? ... a metal casket? ...it's the name of their game ... a tisket a casket...and then transporting it to Kansas City, Mo. ...the plane ride..."smoking or non-smoking section?" somebody asked ... the non-thinking section was what I wanted.... "...a soft sprinkle of snow as we huddled around her...the first of the season, they told me ... lasted only through the short service ...snow stopped the instant the last words were spoken. He had the grace to celebrate her arrival with a handful of His confetti ..."

== Death ==
Goodman Ace died eight years after his wife, in their New York City home in March 1982. The couple are interred together in Mount Carmel Cemetery in Raytown: a suburb of their native Kansas City.

"Mr. Ace", wrote The New York Times's obituarist, David Bird, "liked to scoff at ratings. He said that neither the writer nor a star alone could make or break a comedy show. It took, he said, a good time spot and teamwork. 'The whole thing has to be a kind of partnership—a marriage between writer and performer,' he explained, 'If there is no marriage—well you know what the brainchild has to be'."

The author of CBS: Reflections in a Bloodshot Eye, Robert Metz, recalled that, once, a relative of Ace's had wired him to say, "Send me $10,000 or I'll jump from the fourteenth floor of my building", and Ace was said to have wired back, "Jump from seven—I'll send $5,000."

When CBS fired Ace as the head of its "comedy workshop" in the late 1940s, according to Time, a sympathetic network vice president told him afterward, "I'll tell you a secret—we haven't got a man who understands comedy." Ace wryly replied, "I'll tell you a secret—that's no secret."

Ace offered his own epitaph when Saturday Review ran a poll asking well-known Americans to nominate members of a contemporary Hall of Fame. "I respectfully suggest the name of Goodman Ace...if he's still around", Ace replied. "If he isn't, I wouldn't dig him up just for this." The National Radio Hall of Fame respectfully ignored that suggestion, inducting Easy Aces in 1990.
