= Frederick Ziv =

American pioneering broadcast TV producer (1905–2001)

Frederick William Ziv
- Born: August 17, 1905; Cincinnati, Ohio
- Died: October 13, 2001 (aged 96)
- Occupations: U.S. Broadcasting Producer and Television Syndicator
- Organization: Frederic W. Ziv Company
- Television: Sea Hunt
- Parents: William Ziv (father); Rose Ziv (mother)

Frederick William Ziv (August 17, 1905 – October 13, 2001, Cincinnati, Ohio) was an American broadcasting producer and syndicator who was considered as the father of television first-run syndication and once operated the nation's largest independent television production company. An obituary in The Cincinnati Enquirer noted that Ziv "was known throughout the television industry for pioneering production, sales, promotion and marketing of TV series."

== Early years ==
Frederick Ziv was born in Cincinnati, Ohio, to William and Rose Ziv. His parents were Jewish immigrants: his father William, a manufacturer of button holes for overalls, came to the US in 1884 from Kelm, Lithuania (then part of the Russian Empire) and his mother Rose from Bessarabia three years later. He had a sister named Irma. He graduated from Hughes High School.

== Ziv Company ==
Although he earned a Juris Doctor degree from the University of Michigan in Ann Arbor in 1928, Ziv did not practice law, but instead opened an advertising agency. His native city, Cincinnati, was an important center for radio in the 1920s. The nation's largest radio sponsor, Procter & Gamble, and one of its most powerful radio stations, WLW, were based there. Ziv and writer John L. Sinn, who later became his business partner and son-in-law, founded the Frederic W. Ziv Company (also given as Frederick W. Ziv Company) that produced syndicated radio and television programs in the United States. Horace Newcomb's Encyclopedia of Television described the company as "by 1948 ... the largest packager and syndicator of radio programs" and later "the most prolific producer of programming for the first-run syndication market during the 1950s.". They produced pre-recorded radio shows such as Boston Blackie and The Cisco Kid and occasionally bought old shows for new syndicated rerun broadcast. The best known was the serial comedy Easy Aces in 1945.

== Ziv Television ==
In preparation for providing programming for television syndication, Ziv began to purchase film libraries. By July 1948, the company had bought four such libraries—General, Miles, Kinogram and Forster—providing a total of more than 13 million feet of film.

That same year, 1948, the company had opened a production subsidiary, Ziv Television Programs, Inc.; which produced some of America's best-remembered shows, including television versions of The Cisco Kid (1949), the first American television program filmed in color, and Mr. District Attorney, plus such original creations as Highway Patrol. Perhaps the best remembered Ziv television production was I Led Three Lives, one of the few 1950s television crime dramas addressing the real or alleged Communist menace overtly. Bat Masterson, fictionalizing the legendary dapper marshal and gunfighter, and Sea Hunt were also Ziv first-run syndicated television productions.

Ziv Television Productions trademarks included odd for the time twists on the genres of his shows, such as a crime-fighting underwater explorer (Lloyd Bridges as Sea Hunt's protagonist Mike Nelson) and Highway Patrol, starring Broderick Crawford as Dan Mathews, possibly the first crime drama to show that large urban regions were not the only places where criminals roamed. The company's closing logo, the name Ziv in large, Romanesque lettering, inside the frame of a television tube, was one of the most familiar sign-off logos of its time.

Ziv's fortunes shifted almost overnight in the mid-1950s. In 1955, they were America's leading independent producer, with a reported two thousand employees, and Ziv was able to buy his own production studio after years of leasing from the Hollywood studios. The following year, in 1956, the Big Three television networks, ABC, CBS and NBC, realized how successful they could be by syndicating their own hits, a move that cut deeply into the first-run syndication television market. Then Ziv turned to producing series for the networks, beginning with The West Point Story for CBS in the fall of 1956.

== Network takeover ==
By 1959, the networks began taking control of what went on the air from sponsors, a major result of the quiz show scandals that exploded that same year, but Ziv was very unhappy about it. "They demanded script and cast approvals," he was quoted as saying. "You were just doing whatever the networks asked you to do, but that wasn't my type of operation. I didn’t care to become an employee for the networks."

In 1960, Ziv sold 80% of his company to a group of investors and sold his own TV production subsidiary to United Artists renamed Ziv-United Artists, leaving the board of directors when United Artists decided to phase out Ziv Television Programs and reorganize as United Artists Television two years later.

== Later years ==
Ziv lectured at the College of Mount St. Joseph and served as "distinguished Professor of Radio-Television and Theater Crafts" at the University of Cincinnati, which awarded him an honorary doctorate in performing arts in 1985. He then settled into full-time retirement.

== Death ==
Ziv died at the age of 96 in 2001. He was survived by a son and a daughter.

The University of Cincinnati annually presents a broadcasting achievement award in his name.

He is buried in the United Jewish Cemetery in his birth city, Cincinnati, Ohio.
