= Easy Aces =

American serial comedy radio series

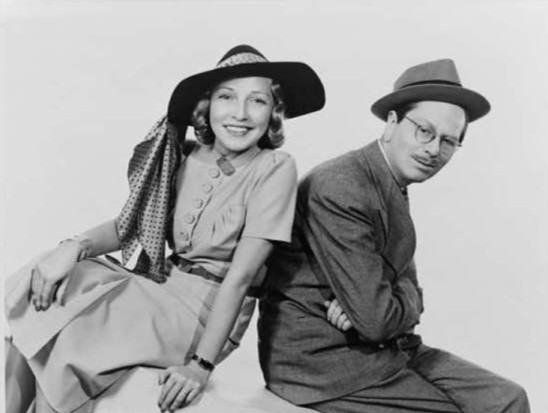
- Goodman and Jane Ace-Easy Aces (1939)
- Genre: Comedy
- Running time: 15 minutes (KMBC); 30 minutes (CBS)
- Country of origin: USA
- Language: English
- Home station: NBC (Blue); CBS
- Starring: Mary Hunter; Paul Stewart; Martin Gabel; Helene Dumas; Ken Roberts; Ann Thomas; Ethel Blume; Alfred Ryder; Peggy Allenby
- Announcer: Truman Bradley; Ford Bond
- Written by: Goodman Ace
- Original release: 1930 – 1945
- Opening theme: "Manhattan Serenade"

Easy Aces is an American serial radio comedy (1930–1945). It was trademarked by the low-keyed drollery of creator and writer Goodman Ace and his wife, Jane, as an urbane, put-upon realtor and his malaprop-prone wife. A 15-minute program, airing as often as five times a week, Easy Aces did not draw as strong ratings as other 15-minute serial comedies such as Amos 'n' Andy, The Goldbergs, Lum and Abner, or Vic and Sade but its unobtrusive, conversational, and clever style, and the cheerful absurdism of its storylines, built a loyal enough audience of listeners and critics alike to keep it on the air for 15 years.

== Accident of circumstance ==
Goodman Ace (b. Goodman Aiskowitz, 1899–1982) was a film critic for the Kansas City Journal-Post in his native Kansas City. On radio station KMBC, he read comic strips to children on Sunday mornings and reviewed films on Friday evenings. One night in 1930, the cast of the 15-minute show that followed his slot failed to show up, and Ace found himself having to fill in the time. His wife, Jane (b. Jane Epstein, 1897–1974), had accompanied him to the studio that night, and the two engaged in an impromptu chat about their weekend bridge game. This brought such a favorable response that the station invited Ace to create a domestic comedy—even though neither of the couple had ever really acted before.

At first, according to radio historian John Dunning (in On the Air: The Encyclopedia of Old-Time Radio), the show oriented entirely around the couple's bridge playing, and nearly died the same way, when Jane Ace was said to have lost her temper over her husband's constant needling of her style of play, and threatened to quit the show entirely. Ace revamped the show into "a more universally based domestic comedy revolving around Jane's improbable situations and her impossible turns of phrase." The result was one of radio's most respected comedies, going on to a fifteen-year air life despite its never being a ratings blockbuster. It was the first KMBC program to go on to become a network radio show.

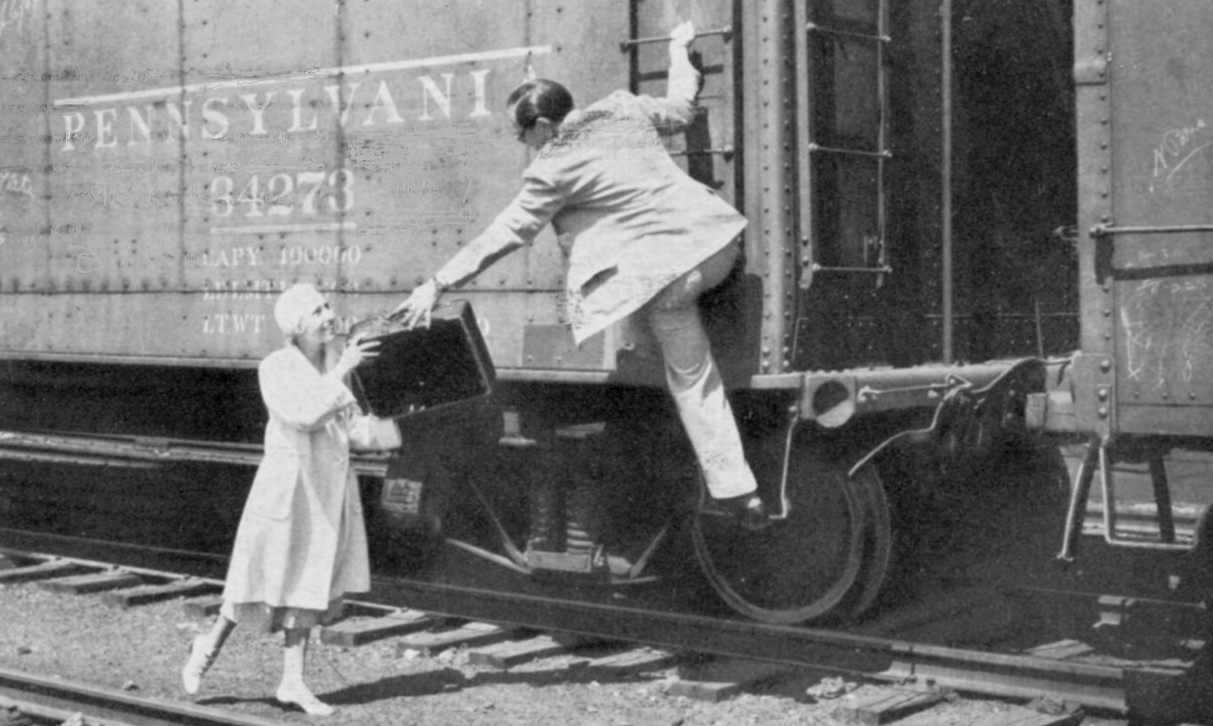
Easy Aces postcard sent to listeners by the show's sponsor, Lavoris, reminding them that new episodes of the program would begin 26 September 1932 on CBS (Columbia Network). Goodman and Jane appear to be returning from vacation by freight train.

Easy Aces moved to WBBM Chicago in 1930 on a trial basis; the Aces themselves launched a write-in appeal to test the size of their audience and thousands of letters convinced original sponsor Lavoris to renew the deal for 1932–33. (A typical Ace maneuver, according to Dunning, was to buy trade publication ad space poking fun at the show's modest rating: after all, a typical Ace ad would say, the ratings were polled by telephone and the Easy Aces audience never answered the phone while the show was on.) The program began airing on the CBS network in March 1932. That summer, the Aces sought New York City backing and found it in the Blackett, Sample and Hummert agency headed by Frank Hummert, soon to become radio's top soap opera producer with his wife Anne but then producing various other programs.

Hummert liked the Aces' style and the show's low overhead and put them on CBS as often as four times weekly, as an afternoon offering, before Anacin (marketed at that time by American Home Products' Whitehall Pharmaceutical division) moved them to 7 p.m. in 1935—right up against Amos 'n' Andy. Easy Aces could not win its timeslot but it did build a loyal audience of its own. The show moved to the NBC Blue Network and a 7:30 p.m. time slot Mondays and Wednesdays, beginning in 1935, before returning to CBS in 1942, holding the same time slot on Wednesdays and Fridays. The show became a half-hour entry one night a week from 1943 through January 1945. It ended when Goodman Ace and Anacin had a disagreement over a musical bridge in one of the episodes; he, in turn, criticized their use of cardboard packaging instead of tin for their headache tablets, calling it a "gyp".

In 1934, the couple was signed by Educational Pictures to do Easy Aces two reel comedies. Dumb Luck was released 18 January 1935, with the Aces reprising their radio roles. In 1936–37, the "Easy Aces" narrated a series of one-reel comic travelogues for the Van Beuren Corporation, released thru RKO Radio Pictures.

Easy Aces storylines often ran several episodes, though there were many single-episode stories, and the show was performed live on the air but in an isolated studio, without an audience, which suited its conversational style. Goodman Ace wrote the show's scripts and played the exasperated but loving husband of Jane Ace, his deceptively scatterbrained, language-molesting, more than periodically meddlesome wife. (Like many radio couples of the day, the Aces used their real names on the air, though no one ever addressed Ace by his first name—it was always Ace—and Jane chose the maiden name of Sherwood for her on-air character.)

There were no sound effects beyond the almost ambient-like playing of normal life sounds, and the Aces' inexperience as actors probably worked in their favour: they simply played as though they were allowing listeners to eavesdrop on their own real-life conversations, allowing Easy Aces listeners more than those of many shows to believe the Aces really could have been their own unusual neighbours. The couple worked from a card table with a microphone sunk in its center, feeling it was easier to talk to each other in this manner rather than standing at a microphone. In addition, as Arthur Frank Wertheim noted in his book Radio Comedy, Ace shunned belly laughs in favour of consistent character humour. "A lot of times, on the air," Wertheim quoted Ace as saying, "I noticed comics in a sketch do a joke that destroys the character because it gets a big laugh."

The cast included Mary Hunter as best friend and boarder Marge; Paul Stewart as ne'er-do-well brother-in-law Johnny; Martin Gabel as Neil Williams, a newspaper reporter and Marge's love interest; Helene Dumas as Southern maid Laura; Ken Roberts as Cokie, an orphaned young adult "adopted" by the Aces; Ann Thomas as Ace's secretary; Ethel Blume as the Aces' niece, Betty; Alfred Ryder (remembered best as Sammy on another old-time radio mainstay, The Goldbergs) as Betty's husband, Carl Neff; Peggy Allenby as Mrs. Benton, a nosy, gossipy neighbour who turned up now and then to leave openings for Jane to fret and gnash over imagined slights or indiscretions; and, Truman Bradley and Ford Bond as their announcers. When Easy Aces relocated from Chicago to New York, the actor who played Marge's husband did not move along with the rest of the cast; Ace wrote him out of the script with a divorce for the couple and a new boyfriend for Marge. He then received a letter from an extremely loyal fan who said that since he did not believe in divorce, he would stop listening to the show unless Marge's ex-husband was written out of the story as dead.

Ace prodded the network to build set tables with microphones embedded beneath them, not in front of or above them, the better to ease the prospect of mike fright among their co-performers and allow them to sound like themselves and not actors. Further along that line, Ace refused to rehearse an episode more than once, the better to avoid destroying the spontaneity that made the show work as it did.

== "I am his awfully-wedded wife" ==
Her comedy relied on wordplay and malapropisms, written by her husband Goodman Ace and supplemented by her own improvisations.[24] Mary Hunter's unscripted laughter during performances served a role similar to a laugh track before canned laughter was introduced to radio. Her characteristic misstatements became known as "Jane-isms."[25] Examples of these included:

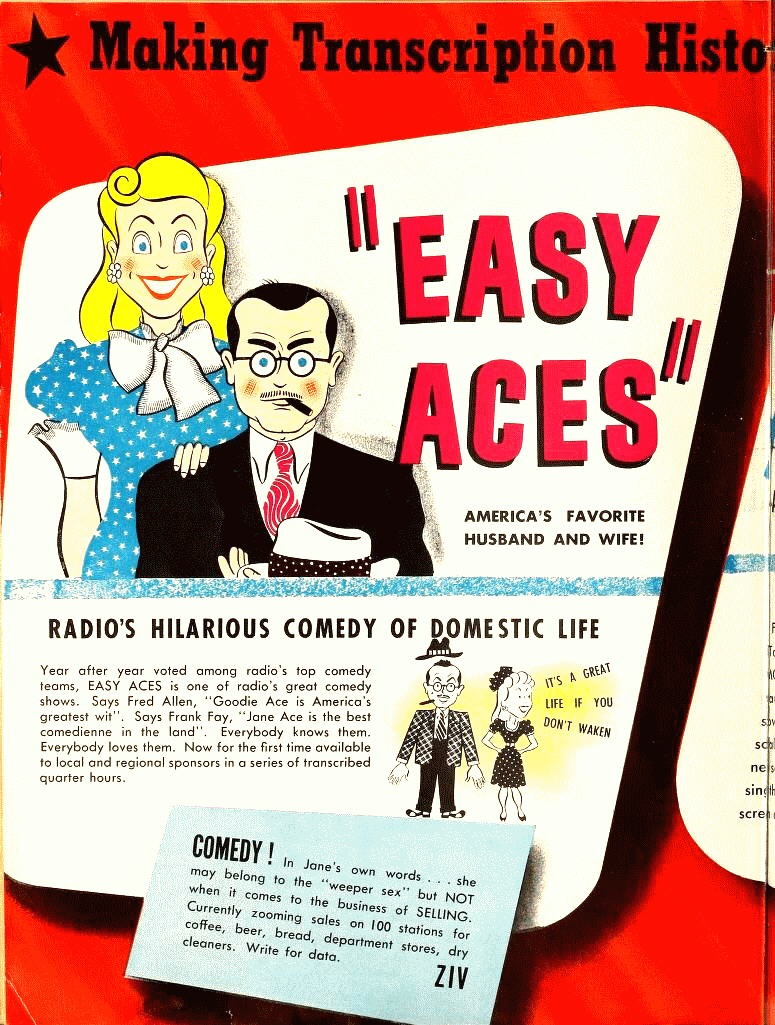
ZIV Company advertisement for radio program transcriptions (1945)

- Perish forbid!
- Congress is back in season.
- You could have knocked me down with a fender.
- Up at the crank of dawn.
- Time wounds all heels.
- Now, there's no use crying over spoiled milk.
- I'm completely uninhabited.
- Seems like only a year ago they were married nine years!
- I am his awfully-wedded wife.
- He blew up higher than a hall.
- I look like the wrath of grapes!
- I wasn't under the impersonation you meant me!
- He shot out of here like a bat out of a belfry.
- I'm sitting on pins and cushions.
- The coffee will be ready in a jitney.
- This hangnail expression...
- I don't drink, I'm a totalitarian.
- We'll be together like Simonized twins.
- Well, you've got to take the bitter with the better.

Jane Ace's malaprops were less limited in their word play than the Mrs. Malaprop of Richard Brinsley Sheridan's The Rivals. She was scripted as having a knack for making right the muddled situations she made muddled in the first place, by stumbling into the solutions right before her original muddling might have blown everything to smithereens. Some critics such as the New York Herald-Tribune's John Crosby noted her language molestation betrayed a "crazy like a fox" intelligence with its own logical illogic, but as Crosby himself said, "There are a lot of Malaprops in radio but none of them scrambles a cliché quite so skillfully as Jane."

== Cheerful absurdity ==
The show's storylines, crafted to allow for steady unfurling of absurdities, included dealing with deadbeat brother-in-law Johnny falling into work as a private investigator; accidentally discovering a potential boxing champion when first thinking about adopting an orphan; losing (in a crooked politician's crooked deal) and then regaining Ace's real estate business; Jane becoming a professional bridge player (as the instructor's living example of how not to play bridge!); Jane's misguided attempts to help her husband's business affairs (mostly under the influence of a domineering woman who had manipulated her husband's business success); and various Jane-instigated romantic mishaps. (Jane: "Well, you could have knocked me over with a fender"; Ace, deadpan: "There's an idea"). There were frequent allusions to playing bridge, as well, even when the game wasn't a storyline centerpiece; this may have been the Aces' own nod of thanks to the subject that provoked the show's creation in the first place.

In 1945, Easy Aces lost its longtime sponsor, Anacin, after a company representative objected to a musical interlude. (The Aces at one point used small music themes, usually spun off a line of dialogue toward the end of the previous scene.) Ace rejoined by suggesting he didn't like Anacin switching from small tins to small cardboard boxes to package its aspirin. "They sent me a two-word answer: 'you're fired'," Ace remembered in a radio interview many years later.

== Episode status ==
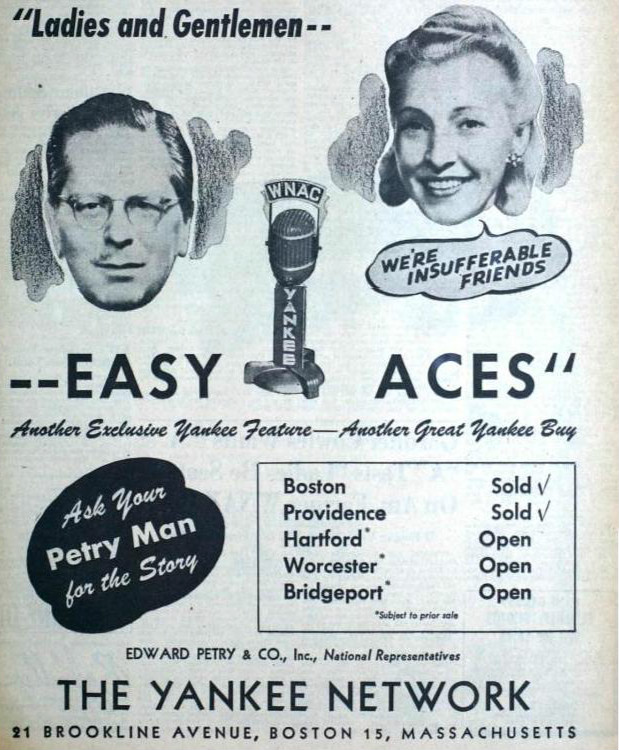
The program in syndication on the Yankee Network in 1945.

Easy Aces survives with many of its best episodes intact thanks to a bit of foresight on the Aces' part. They owned the rights from the beginning, recorded ("transcribed," in the day's vernacular) just about all its episodes, and sold the syndication rights to over three hundred episodes from 1937 to 1941 to the Frederick Ziv Company, a Cincinnati-based distribution firm (and later producers of television shows like Bat Masterson), in 1945.

These episodes became a bigger ratings hit in syndication than when the Aces and cast performed them originally. These Easy Aces episodes are those available to old-time radio collectors, in above-average sound condition, but minus their commercial spots, edited away the better to foster future, differently-sponsored airings. The Library of Congress is believed to have perhaps one or two hundred more Easy Aces episodes in its collection.

== Resurrected Aces ==
In 1948, the Aces revived the show on CBS as mr. ace and JANE (the unusual spelling was Ace's idea) on Saturday nights at 7pm. (Time had reported a year earlier that the Aces were pondering whether to create a new fifteen-minute serial for Jane almost exclusively, but she couldn't decide whether to do that or a new half-hour show with a live audience.) Recorded live before a studio audience, the new version also revived and expanded a few of the vintage Easy Aces plots and presented a few new ones. The new show was sponsored first by the U.S. Army Recruiting Service and, later, by Jell-O.

"The new program," wrote Crosby, in a 31 March 1948 column, "differs from the old Easy Aces in about the same manner as the new and old Amos 'n' Andy programs. It's once a week, half-hour, streamlined up-to-date and very, very funny... Goodman Ace, the brains of this team, tags along behind his wife, acting as narrator for her mishaps in a dry, resigned voice (one of the few intelligent voices on the air) and interjecting witty comment. The couple's conversations are usually masterpieces of cross-purpose."

Jane-isms included her being assigned to a jury panel and remarking: I'll say he's not guilty, whoever he is. If he's nice enough to pay me three dollars a day to be his jury, the least I can do is recuperate, doesn't it to you? "In most other respects," John Crosby wrote, "Jane is a rather difficult conversationalist because she is either three jumps ahead or three long strides behind the person she is conversing with."

Of Goodman Ace, Crosby wrote that with the revival show he "uses his program to take a few pokes at radio, the newspapers, and the world in general. He's particularly sharp on the subject of radio, a field he knows intimately. Once, playing the role of an advertising man, he asked a prospective sponsor what sort of radio program he had in mind. 'How about music?' asked Ace. 'Music? That's been done, hasn't it?' said the sponsor."

The Aces' co-stars now included Leon Janney, John Griggs, Evelyn Varden, Eric Dressler, Cliff Hall, and Pert Kelton. (Kelton would soon become the first Alice Kramden, in the earliest "Honeymooners" sketches on Jackie Gleason's original Cavalcade of Stars variety hour on the old, experimental DuMont network.) The new announcer was Ken Roberts, from their old cast, and he also joined the new cast as a next-door neighbour who just so happened to be . . . a radio announcer. (Jane's asking for an autograph each time they met became a small running gag on the new show.) Ace sketched Roberts in character as full of jibes about radio commercial announcements, a typical such jibe going thus: "Fifty years ago, Blycose began selling the public its high-quality products. And, today, just as it was fifty years ago, it is March 20."

But however favorably mr. ace and JANE was reviewed, however high the quality the Aces injected into it, it wasn't enough to extend its new life for more than one year. CBS kept the show on the air as a sustaining (non-sponsored) program for some months after Jell-O no longer was the sponsor. Nor was it enough to gain the Aces a steady television audience, when they tried reviving the original Easy Aces format and style and adapting it to a 15-minute TV show on the Dumont Television Network which ran from 14 December 1949 to 7 June 1950. Only one episode of the DuMont show is known to exist, in the J. Fred MacDonald collection at the Library of Congress.

In 1956, it seemed that the television version of the show would be revived. There was news that NBC and Goodman Ace had selected Ernie Kovacs and his wife, Edie Adams, to play the roles of the couple in a pilot, but there is no information as to whether the pilot was ever filmed.

== Afterlife ==
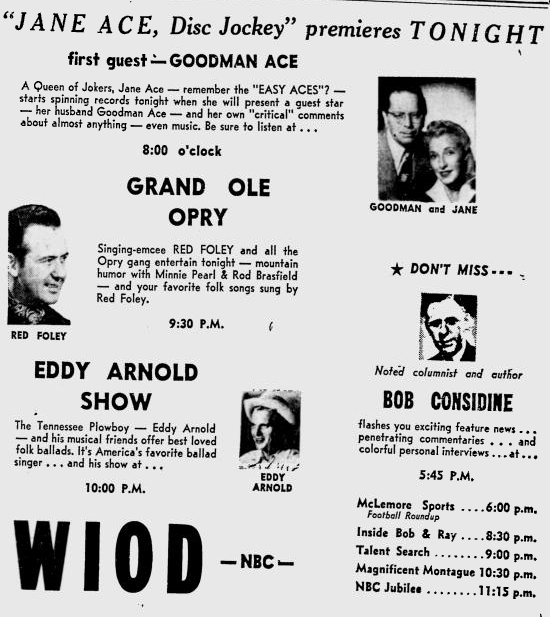
Premiere of "Jane Ace, Disk Jockey", 27 October 1951.

Jane Ace all but retired from public life (taking a very brief turn as what her husband called "a comedienne now making her come-down as a disc jockey" in the early 1950s) after Easy Aces was laid to rest at long last. The Aces were hired as NBC Radio Monitor "Communicators" in 1955; they were given a spot just after Dave Garroway. The couple was also signed to an NBC Radio show for women called Weekday that went on the air not long after Monitor's debut. Weekday was aired Monday through Friday. They also went into commercial work.

Goodman Ace enjoyed a second career as a writer. He wrote for radio (most notably, as head writer for Tallulah Bankhead's weekly variety show, The Big Show, but also for Ed Wynn, Jack Benny, Abbott & Costello, Danny Kaye, and others), for television (most notably, for Milton Berle, Sid Caesar, Perry Como, Robert Q. Lewis, and Bob Newhart), and as a weekly columnist for Saturday Review (formerly The Saturday Review of Literature). Those columns eventually yielded three anthologies: The Book of Little Knowledge: More Than You Want to Know About Television, The Fine Art of Hypochondria, or How Are You and The Better of Goodman Ace.

In 1970, Ace published a book of eight complete Easy Aces scripts as well as essays about living with, working with and loving the malaprop queen, plus a seven-inch flexidisc that extracted from the original radio performance of one of those scripts, "Jane Sees a Psychiatrist." The book was named for the show's standard introduction: Ladies and Gentlemen--Easy Aces. He also held a regular slot for humorous commentaries on New York-area station WPAT for a few years before spending the rest of his life as a writer and lecturer.

The show and the Aces were inducted into the National Radio Hall of Fame in 1990.

A Canadian television sitcom, The Trouble with Tracy, was adapted from the Easy Aces scripts in the early 1970s. Through a variety of factors -- notably, that 7 episodes were recorded every five days, allowing no time for retakes for flubbed lines or missed cues -- The Trouble with Tracy has been labelled by some television critics as one of the worst TV comedies ever produced.

== See also ==
- List of programs broadcast by the DuMont Television Network
- List of surviving DuMont Television Network broadcasts

== Sources ==
- Goodman Ace, Ladies and Gentlemen, Easy Aces (New York: Doubleday, 1970).
- Fred Allen (Joe McCarthy, editor), Fred Allen's Letters (New York: Doubleday, 1965).
- Dick Bertel, The Golden Age of Radio, interview with Goodman Ace, October 1971.
- Tim Brooks and Earle Marsh, The Complete Directory to Prime Network TV Shows -- 1946 to Present (First Edition)
- Frank Buxton and Bill Owen, The Big Broadcast 1920-1950
- John Crosby, Out of the Blue (New York: Simon and Schuster, 1952)
- WBAI-FM, Richard Lamparski interview with Goodman Ace, December 1970.
- Leonard Maltin, The Great American Broadcast: A Celebration of Radio's Golden Age (New York: Dutton/Penguin, 1997)
- Robert Metz, CBS: Reflections in a Bloodshot Eye
- Arthur Frank Wertheim, Radio Comedy. (New York: Oxford University Press, 1979)
- John Dunning, On the Air: The Encyclopedia of Old-Time Radio (New York: Oxford University Press, 1998)

== Listen to ==
- Download 239 Easy Aces episodes from archive.org
- Boxcars711: Easy Aces (two episodes)
- Easy Aces and mr. ace and JANE episodes Old Time Radio-OTR
- "Easy Aces on Way Back When"
