= Flipper (franchise) =

Children's film franchise

- Official franchise logo
- Based on: Flipper by Ricou Browning; Jack Cowden
- Distributed by: Metro-Goldwyn-Mayer (1, 2); National Broadcasting Company (1963); Pax TV (1994); Universal Pictures (3)
- Country: United States
- Language: English
- Budget: $26,030,000 (2 films)
- Box office: >$30,593,313 (3 films)

Flipper is an American media franchise consisting of three family adventure films and two television shows. Based on original an original story created by Arthur Weiss, Ricou Browning and Jack Cowden, the plot centers around a family who becomes friends with a notably intelligent bottlenose dolphin they rescued from injuries, which they name Flipper. Through the events of the franchise, Flipper regularly gives aid to his human friends and selflessly comes to their rescue to return the favor. The famous "voice" of Flipper was actually the sped-up song of a kookaburra, "dolphins have no vocal chords -- the noise they make comes through their blowhole".

The franchise as a whole was met with mixed critical and financial reception, with each installment faring diversly. The original movie received mild response from critics, with a similar outcome at the box office. Its sequel earned praise from critics and a higher monetary return, with the first television spin-off series receiving warm reception from critics and viewers alike. Though the 1995 continuation show was generally well-received critically, it did not see successful viewership. Conversely, though the 1996 remake film was a financial success, it was poorly received by critics and declared as inferior to the similarly-themed Free Willy franchise.

== Films ==
Film	U.S. release date	Director	Screenwriter	Story by	Producer(s)
Flipper	August 14, 1963	James B. Clark	Arthur Weiss	Ricou Browning & Jack Cowden	Ivan Tors
Flipper's New Adventure	June 24, 1964	Leon Benson	Art Arthur	Ivan Tors	Ivan Tors
Flipper	May 10, 1996	Alan Shapiro	Alan Shapiro	Ricou Browning & Jack Cowden	James McNamara and Perry Katz

=== Flipper (1963) ===
Sandy Ricks, a young boy living in the Florida Keys, has his world forever changed one day when he discovers an injured bottlenose dolphin. After rescuing the animal and nursing it back to health, he names the dolphin Flipper. The pair form a friendly bond while exploring various areas, and enjoying their adventures together. When his father Porter instructs him to return Flipper to the wild of open sea, Sandy is disheartened and tries to sneak away with his friend from the ocean.

The importance of the pair's friendship is displayed when an encounter with a shark on the hunt becomes a dangerous situation and Flipper's loyalty is shown when he fights to protect the young boy who saved his life.

=== Flipper's New Adventure (1964) ===
Through a number of years, Sandy has formed a meaningful friendship with Flipper and their bond strengthened through their adventures. With his wife since deceased, Porter's primary focus has shifted to providing for his son and continues studying to become a park ranger. When plans for construction in the Florida Keys cause some hardship for his father's job as a fisherman, Sandy learns that the family may be moving. Determined to remain close to his animal friend, Sandy leaves for the Bahama Islands with the dolphin.

Before he can make it to his destination, he is forced to stop at a nearby deserted island when he runs out of resources. There he discovers a British family who is being held for ransom. As he tries to devise a plan to help them escape, he secretly befriends their daughter Penny. Becoming romantically interested in her, he finds himself worrying about whether he will see her once they escape their captors. While Sandy works with Flipper to help their new friends, Porter begins a search in all the nearby islands for his lost son.

=== Flipper (1996) ===
Sandy Ricks, is a teenager from Chicago who is struggling with adjusting to the divorce of his parents. His mother decides that a vacation may be therapeutic for him. Sending him to the Florida Keys for the summer to stay with his uncle Porter, Sandy becomes resentful for the situation and his uncle.

Though his poor attitude towards the big game fishing proves to be a struggle for Uncle Porter, Sandy's life is changed when he encounters a young bottlenose dolphin who recently escaped the slaughter of his familial pod, which was killed by Porter's rival and enemy, Dirk Moran. Befriending and caring for the orphaned animal and experiencing adventures together, he also becomes familiar with a local girl named Kim Parker and develops a romantic interest in her. As Sandy begins to feel like his life is improving, he and Kim find that Flipper has beached himself and is gravely sick. After nursing him back to health, the friends become aware that toxic waste is being dumped into the ocean by Moran and his crew. Determined to confront the criminal, situation becomes dire when Sandy finds himself in open water being pursued by a large and predatory hammerhead referred to by locals as "Scar". Just when his parents and uncle are too far from him to come to the rescue, the bond he has formed with Flipper may save his life.

== Television ==
Series	Season(s)	Episode(s)	Originally released			Showrunners	Executive producer(s)	Status
Series	Season(s)	Episode(s)	First released	Last released	Network(s)	Showrunners	Executive producer(s)	Status
Flipper	3	88	September 19, 1964	April 15, 1967	NBC	Ricou Browning & Jack Cowden	Ivan Tors and Ricou Browning	Ended
Flipper: The New Adventures	4	84	October 2, 1995	July 1, 2000	Syndication (Seasons 1–2) Pax TV (Seasons 3–4)	E.F. Wallengren, Michael Nankin & Reuben Leder	Jeffrey M. Hayes, E.F., Samuel Goldwyn Jr., Reuben Leder, and Greg Coote	Ended

=== Flipper (1964–1967) ===
Continuing the plot from the first two films, the series details the continued adventures of the Ricks family and their friend Flipper the bottlenose dolphin. Porter continues his role as a widower father over his two sons Sandy and Keith "Bud" Ricks, while also working as the chief warden and park ranger over the Coral Key Park and Marine Preserve in Florida. Sandy continues to grow in his teenage years, while Bud grows a closer friendship with Flipper. Sandy, Budd, and Flipper work together, to confound the conniving plans of criminals in the area.

=== Flipper: The New Adventures (1995–1997) ===
Years chronologically after the previous television series, Keith "Budd" Ricks now leads dolphin research Bal Harbour Research Institute in the Florida Keys. Having earned his doctorate in animal science, he works with various others to preserve the natural resources of the area. Through the series, various other main characters also work in the establishment including but not limited to Dr. Pam Blondell, Maya Graham, Dr. Jennifer Daulton, Edward "Cap" Daulton, Dep. Tom Hampton, Lt. Alex Parker, and Courtney Gordon. With the aid of the exceptionally intelligent bottlenose dolphin Flipper, the crew regularly discovers the nefarious plans of local criminals and reports them to local authorities.

== Main cast and characters ==
List indicator

This section includes characters who will appear or have appeared in the franchise in main roles.

- An empty grey cell indicates the character was not in the film, or that the character's official presence has not yet been confirmed.

Character	Film			Television						
Character	"Flipper"	Flipper's New Adventure	Flipper	Flipper (1964–1967)			Flipper: The New Adventures (1995–2000)			
Character	"Flipper"	Flipper's New Adventure	Flipper	Season 1	Season 2	Season 3	Season 1	Season 2	Season 3	Season 4
Principal cast
Flipper	Mitzie	Appeared (Note: While Flipper appears in Flipper's New Adventure, Mitzie did not perform scenes for this film, and the character was portrayed using an animatronic Dolphin.)	Appeared	Himself	Himself	Himself	Appeared	Appeared	Appeared	Appeared
Sandy Ricks	Luke Halpin	Luke Halpin	Elijah Wood	Luke Halpin	Luke Halpin	Luke Halpin	Referenced			
Porter Ricks	Chuck Connors	Brian Kelly		Brian Kelly	Brian Kelly	Brian Kelly	Referenced			
Uncle Porter Ricks			Paul Hogan							
Martha Ricks	Kathleen Maguire	Referenced	Mary Jo Faraci	Referenced	Referenced	Referenced	Referenced			
Kim Parker	Connie Scott		Jessica Wesson							
Dr. Keith "Bud" Ricks				Tommy Norden	Tommy Norden	Tommy Norden	Brian Wimmer	Referenced		
Dr. Pam Blondell-Ricks							Colleen Flynn	Referenced		
Mike Blondell							Payton Haas	Referenced		
Maya Graham							Jessica Alba	Jessica Alba	Referenced	
Dr. Jennifer Daulton								Elizabeth Morehead	Referenced	
Dep. Tom Hampton								Whip Hubley	Whip Hubley	Whip Hubley
Lt. Alex Parker-Hampton									Tiffany Lamb	Tiffany Lamb
Chris Parker									Craig Marriott	Craig Marriott
Jackie Parker									Laura Donaldson	Laura Donaldson
Courtney Gordon										Skye Patch
Principal cast
Sandy's sister named Bua Ricks			Allison Bertolino							
Sheriff Rogers	George Applewhite			Eric Applewhite	Eric Applewhite	Eric Applewhite				
Sheriff Buck Cowan			Isaac Hayes							
Penny Hopewell		Pamela Franklin								
Sir Halsey Hopewell		Tom Helmore								
Julia Hopewell		Helen Cherry								
Gwen Hopewell		Francesca Annis								
Gil Bates		Lloyd Battista								
Convict		Courtney Brown								
Convict 2		William Cooley								
Cathy			Chelsea Field							
Dirk Moran			Jonathan Banks							
Marvin			Jason Fuchs							
Ulla Norstrand				Ulla Strömstedt	Ulla Strömstedt	Ulla Strömstedt				
Ed Dennis				Dan Chandler	Dan Chandler	Dan Chandler				
Hap Gorman				Andy Devine	Andy Devine	Andy Devine				
Cpt. Edward "Cap" Daulton								Gus Mercurio	Gus Mercurio	Gus Mercurio
Dean Gregson								Scott Michaelson	Referenced	
Holly Myers								Anja Coleby	Anja Coleby	Anja Coleby

== Additional crew and production details ==
Title	Crew/Detail					
Title	Composer(s)	Cinematographer(s)	Editor	Production companies	Distributing company	Running time
"Flipper"	Henry Vars	Lamar Boren & Joseph C. Brun	Warren Brown	Ivan Tors Productions	Metro-Goldwyn-Mayer	1 hr 30 mins
Flipper's New Adventure	Henry Vars	Lamar Boren	Warren Adams & Charles Craft	Ivan Tors Productions	Metro-Goldwyn-Mayer	1 hr 34 mins
Flipper (The Series)	Henry Vars, Samuel Matlovsky, and Ruby Raksin	Lamar Boren, Howard Winner, Clifford H. Poland Jr., and Edmund Gibson	Charles Craft, Stan Gilbert, Erwin Dumbrille, John B. Woelz, Warren Adams, Harold V. McKenzie, John A. Martinelli, and Robert Paltz	Metro-Goldwyn-Mayer Television, Ivan Tors Productions, Miami Seaquarium	National Broadcasting Company (NBC)	44 hrs (30 mins/episode)
Flipper: The New Adventures	John D'Andrea, Cory Lerios, Garry McDonald, Laurie Stone, and Tom Harriman	John Fleckenstein, John Stokes, Brandon Apps, Gene Moller, and Geoff Cox	David Codron, Regis Kimble, Dennis C. Vejar, Michael J. Hagan, Robert Florio, Chip Masamitsu, Rick Tuber, Mark Sadusky, Suzanne Hines, Suzanne Angel, and Paul Booth	The Samuel Goldwyn Company, Universal Television, Tribune Entertainment, Village Roadshow Pictures Television	Syndication Pax TV	54 hrs 20 mins (43 mins/episode)
Flipper	Joel McNeely	Bill Butler	Peck Prior	The Bubble Factory, American Films	Universal Pictures	1 hr 35 mins

== Reception ==
=== Box office and financial performance ===
Film	Box office gross			Box office ranking		Total home video sales	Budget	Worldwide Net Income/Loss	Ref.
Film	North America	Other territories	Worldwide	All time North America	All time worldwide	Total home video sales	Budget	Worldwide Net Income/Loss	Ref.
"Flipper"	Information not publicly available	—N/a	Information not publicly available	Information not publicly available	Information not publicly available	$2,500,000	$500,000	≥$2,000,000	
Flipper's New Adventure	Information not publicly available	Information not publicly available	Information not publicly available	Information not publicly available	Information not publicly available	$1,600,000	Information not publicly available	≤$1,600,000	
Flipper	$20,080,020	$10,513,293	$30,593,313	#3,793	#4,629	Information not publicly available	$25,530,000	$5,063,313	
Totals	>$20,080,020	>$10,513,293	>$30,593,313	x̅ #1,264	x̅ #1,543	$4,100,000	>$26,030,000	≤$8,663,313	

=== Critical and public response ===
Film	Rotten Tomatoes	Metacritic	CinemaScore
"Flipper"	50% (6 reviews)	—N/a	—N/a
Flipper's New Adventure	(1 review)	—N/a	—N/a
Flipper (The Series)	—N/a	—N/a	—N/a
Flipper: The New Adventures	—N/a	—N/a	—N/a
Flipper	30% (20 reviews)	43/100 (19 reviews)	A−

== Other media ==
In addition to film and television productions, Flipper has appeared in children's books, a limited run comic book in 1966 and 1967, and two video game adaptations, one titled Flipper in 1991, and the other, The Three Worlds of Flipper and Lopaka, in 2000.
