= Lamar Boren =

American cinematographer (1917–1986)

- Born: Lamar Leo Boren; 3 May 1917; Provo, Utah, U.S.
- Died: 13 January 1986; La Jolla, California, U.S.
- Occupations: Cinematographer, camera operator
- Years active: 1955–1979

Lamar Leo Boren, ASC (May 3, 1917–January 15, 1986) was an American cinematographer, best known for his underwater photography. He notably worked on several films and television series for Ivan Tors, and shot underwater sequences on several James Bond films.

== Biography ==
Born in Utah but raised in Riverside, California, Boren was interested in both underwater diving and photography. He built his own helmet as a teenager and in 1943 became a member of the San Diego Bottom Scratchers Diving Club. Membership of the club required Boren to dive 30 feet, capture three abalone in one dive, grab a five-foot horn shark by the tail and bring up a "good sized" lobster. He constructed a case for his 16mm camera to film underwater and in 1952 built a 35mm underwater camera that led him to begin his feature film career shooting the undersea sequences for Underwater! (1955).

His next film Underwater Warrior (1958) was about a fellow diver Commandeer Francis Fane who Boren had known in Coronado. The film introduced him to Ivan Tors leading him to photograph Tors' underwater television series Sea Hunt. The success of the show enabled him to co-write and produce an unsuccessful television pilot Sea Divers and shoot underwater sequences for Tors' The Aquanauts. Boren enjoyed shooting in the clear water of Weeki Wachee Springs, Florida that not only featured clear water and exotic scenery but was more accessible, more economical, and safer than shooting overseas.

Boren worked with Tors and often director Andrew Marton on a number of popular films such as Flipper (1963), Flipper's New Adventure (1964), two films set in Africa, Rhino! (1964) and Clarence, the Cross-Eyed Lion (1965), Zebra in the Kitchen (1965), Namu, the Killer Whale, Around the World Under the Sea (1966), Daring Game (1968), Hello Down There (1969) and Tors' Flipper 1964 TV series.

Boren's work led him to be noticed by Albert R. Broccoli and Harry Saltzman where he filmed the underwater sequences in Thunderball (1965) though originally the producers contacted him about the film in 1961. In addition to shooting the underwater scenes his wife Evelyne doubled Claudine Auger. Boren provided more underwater shooting for Eon Productions with You Only Live Twice, The Spy Who Loved Me (1977) and Moonraker (1979).

Boren's other film work includes The Old Man and the Sea, Don't Give Up the Ship (1959), The Neptune Factor (1973) and The Day of the Dolphin (1973).

In addition to underwater and African film work Boren was cinematographer for a large number of American television series such as Then Came Bronson, The Six Million Dollar Man, Project U.F.O., The Rockford Files and Vega$.
