= Island of the Lost =

1967 American adventure film

- Directed by: John Florea
- Screenplay by: Richard Carlson
- Story by: Ivan Tors; Richard Carlson
- Produced by: Ivan Tors
- Starring: Richard Greene; Luke Halpin; Irene Tsu
- Cinematography: Howard Winner
- Edited by: Robert Glenn
- Music by: George Bruns
- Production company: Ivan Tors Productions
- Distributed by: Paramount Pictures
- Release date: 1967
- Running time: 92 minutes
- Country: United States
- Language: English

Island of the Lost is a 1967 American adventure film directed by John Florea and starring Richard Greene, Luke Halpin and Irene Tsu. It was shot on location in The Bahamas and Palm Beach Gardens in Florida.

== Plot ==
An anthropologist and his family are shipwrecked on a Pacific island inhabited by prehistoric animals.

== Cast ==
- Richard Greene as Josh MacRae
- Luke Halpin as Stu MacRae
- Sheilah Wells as Sharon MacRae
- Irene Tsu as Judy Hawllani
- Mart Hulswit as Gabe Larsen
- Robin Mattson as Lizzie MacRae
- Jose De Vega as Tupuna

== Bibliography ==
- Leslie Halliwell. Halliwell's Film Guide. Scribner, 1989.
