= Slinker =

Slinker may refer to:

- Ron Slinker, an American wrestler
- Gollum (slinker), a character from The Lord of the Rings novel
- An alternative name for the northern pike, Esox lucius
