= Salty (film) =

1973 American family film

- Poster
- Directed by: Ricou Browning
- Written by: Ricou Browning; Jack Cowden
- Produced by: Kobi Jaeger
- Starring: Mark Slade; Nina Foch; Julius Harris; Linda Scruggs; Clint Howard
- Cinematography: Clifford H. Poland Jr.
- Edited by: Angelo Ross
- Music by: Samuel Matlovsky
- Distributed by: Saltwater
- Release date: November 1973
- Running time: 90 minutes
- Country: United States
- Language: English

Salty is an American family comedy-drama film directed by Ricou Browning in his feature-length directorial debut. It was written by Ricou Browning and Jack Cowden, who had previously written the 1963 film Flipper and its subsequent television series together.

== Plot ==
Twenty-something Taylor Reed and his teenage brother Tim Reed, whose parents were killed in a hurricane, move to rural Florida where Taylor has obtained a job at a marine life park. They hitch a ride with Clancy Ames, an animal trader traveling by school bus to the same park, and along the way, Tim bonds with the friendly sea lion Salty. They arrive at the park operated by Mrs. Penninger and find that it has fallen on hard times. Taylor, Tim and Clancy work to revive the park while adventures are had with Salty.

== Cast ==
- Mark Slade as Taylor Reed
- Nina Foch as Mrs. Penninger
- Julius Harris as Clancy Ames
- Linda Scruggs as Wendy Lund
- Clint Howard as Tim Reed
- Rance Howard

== Production ==
Filming took place in Key Biscayne and Homestead, Florida. Ricou Browning spoke about the film in an interview with Tom Weaver, saying, "I put a lot of heart and soul into this film, and it was a good, G-rated family film, and it turned out really well. We were publicizing it and traveling with a Winnebago that we made for the sea lion to live in, and going to TV stations and so forth. Well, the PR people sent my résumé ahead of me to these different places. We'd go into these TV studios and I wanted to talk about Salty, but from my résumé, they saw I had played the Creature, and all they wanted to talk about was the Creature! So I finally had to get the PR people to scratch that off, so I could talk about the film we just made [laughs]!"

== TV series ==
The film was followed by the TV series Salty, which ran for one season of 20 episodes from 1974 to 1975. Julius Harris and Mark Slade reprised their roles but Clint Howard, who plays Tim Reed in the film, was replaced by Johnny Doran for the TV series.
