= Rhino! =

1964 film by Ivan Tors

- Theatrical release poster
- Directed by: Ivan Tors
- Screenplay by: Art Arthur; Arthur Weiss
- Story by: Art Arthur
- Produced by: Ben Chapman
- Starring: Harry Guardino; Shirley Eaton; Robert Culp; Harry Makela; George Korelin
- Cinematography: Lamar Boren; Sven Persson
- Edited by: Warren Adams
- Music by: Lalo Schifrin
- Production company: Ivan Tors Films
- Distributed by: Metro-Goldwyn-Mayer
- Release date: May 20, 1964
- Running time: 91 minutes
- Country: United States
- Language: English

Rhino! is a 1964 American action film directed by Ivan Tors and written by Art Arthur and Arthur Weiss. The film stars Harry Guardino, Shirley Eaton, Robert Culp, Harry Makela and George Korelin. The film was released on May 20, 1964, by Metro-Goldwyn-Mayer.

== Plot ==
A humane zoologist, Dr. Jim Hanlon, who deplores the poaching of African rhinoceros, is unaware that the man he is guiding on safari, Alec Burnett, is a hunter intending to capture two rare white rhino to sell. Edith Arleigh is a nurse romantically involved with Burnett, whose hardened attitude toward jungle life softens when he is bitten by a cobra and Hanlon has to save his life.

== Cast ==
- Harry Guardino as Alec Burnett
- Shirley Eaton as Miss Arleigh
- Robert Culp as Dr. Hanlon
- Harry Makela as Jopo
- George Korelin as Haragay

== Production ==
It was the first of two movies Shirley Eaton made for Ivan Tors.

== See also ==
- List of American films of 1964
- Ian Player - South African international conservationist
