= Flipper (1996 film) =

1996 American film

- Theatrical release poster
- Directed by: Alan Shapiro
- Written by: Alan Shapiro
- Based on: Flipper by Arthur Weiss; Ricou Browning; Jack Cowden
- Produced by: James McNamara; Perry Katz
- Starring: Paul Hogan; Elijah Wood; Chelsea Field; Isaac Hayes; Jonathan Banks
- Cinematography: Bill Butler
- Edited by: Peck Prior
- Music by: Joel McNeely
- Production company: The Bubble Factory
- Distributed by: Universal Pictures
- Release date: May 17, 1996
- Running time: 95 minutes
- Country: United States
- Language: English
- Budget: $25 million
- Box office: $35.5 million

Flipper is a 1996 American adventure film and a remake of the 1963 film of the same name (which in turn began a TV series that ran from 1964 to 1967). Written and directed by Alan Shapiro, the film stars Elijah Wood as a boy who has to spend the summer with his uncle (Paul Hogan), who lives on the Florida Gold Coast. Although he expects to have a boring summer, he encounters a dolphin whom he names Flipper and forms a friendship with.

The film is unrelated to the 1995–2000 TV series of the same name, which was itself also a remake of the 1963 film and 1964 TV series. Instead of Metro-Goldwyn-Mayer, a production company for the Flipper franchise, this film is distributed by Universal Pictures.

== Plot ==
Sandy Ricks is sent off for the summer to stay with his Uncle Porter in the seaside town of Coral Key. Initially, Sandy is unenthusiastic and disappointed that he is not going to a Red Hot Chili Peppers concert. His mood remains unchanged even after meeting Cathy, a local shopkeeper with whom his uncle flirts with, and Kim, a girl his own age.

While out on Porter's fishing trawler, they meet Porter's rival, Dirk Moran. Nearby, a pod of bottlenose dolphins is frolicking near Dirk's boat. As a big game fisherman, Dirk Moran makes it plain that he hates just about every other fish-eating animal on earth and shoots at the pod, killing a dolphin. Sandy meets another dolphin that escaped Dirk's shooting and names it Flipper.

The next morning, Porter and Sandy are paid a visit by Sheriff Buck Cowan, who explains that they cannot keep the dolphin unless he is in captivity. That night, Sandy and Kim set out on a dinghy to look for Flipper. They fail to locate the dolphin but see barrels being dumped into the ocean off of Dirk Moran's boat. The next morning, as Kim arrives looking for Sandy, Porter's pet brown pelican Pete comes running as if asking her to follow him. Pete leads Kim to Flipper, who is beached on the shore and sick. They manage to cure the dolphin.

Cathy determines that Flipper has been poisoned by toxic waste, which has also been ruining the local fishing. The group uses Flipper's ability of echolocation and a special camera attached to his head to help them locate the barrels of toxic waste. Flipper then locates and reunites with the rest of his pod, dropping the camera in the process. Porter rushes back to alert the sheriff about the barrels. However, Sandy becomes concerned that something has happened to Flipper, and without informing anyone except Cathy's young son, he sets off in the dinghy to find him.

Sandy barely survives an encounter with Dirk Moran's boat, which dismantles the dinghy. He sees an approaching dorsal fin and thinks it is Flipper, but it is actually Scar, a large great hammerhead shark that has been lurking in the island's waters and is rumored to have taken out a tourist boat. Sandy swims for his life towards Dirk's boat. As Scar is about to attack Sandy, Flipper appears and starts nose-butting him in the gills. There is a harrowing moment when Scar proves stronger than Flipper, but Flipper's dolphin pod comes to his aid in the nick of time and drives Scar away. Dirk Moran is then arrested by the sheriff for illegally dumping toxic waste and attempting to kill Sandy since he knew that he saw them that night.

The next morning, when Sandy's mother Martha and younger sister Bua arrive to pick him up, Flipper appears to see him off.

== Cast ==
- Paul Hogan as Porter Ricks
- Elijah Wood as Sandy Ricks, Porter's nephew
- Chelsea Field as Cathy, Porter's love interest
- Isaac Hayes as Sheriff Buck Cowan
- Jonathan Banks as Dirk Moran, Porter's rival
- Jason Fuchs as Marvin, Cathy's son
- Jessica Wesson as Kim Parker, Sandy's love interest
- Bill Kelley as Donald
- Robert Deacon as Bounty Fisherman #1
- Ann Carey as Fisherman's Wife
- Mark Casella as Bounty Fisherman #2
- Luke Halpin as Bounty Fisherman #3
- Mary Jo Faraci as Martha Ricks, Porter's sister and Sandy's mother
- Allison Bertolino as Bua Ricks, Porter's niece and Sandy's younger sister

== Production ==
Alan Shapiro had initially been working on an Archie adaptation for Universal Pictures until management changed their minds and asked Shapiro to write and direct an adaptation of Flipper instead. Shapiro had no interest in Flipper and initially rejected the idea but took on the project due to the difficulty in getting a film off the ground and was interested in the film making required for such a film which he referred to as Jaws-lite.

The film was shot in the Bahamas. Animatronic dolphins, designed by Walt Conti and his team, had to be used extensively, such as in scenes where Flipper interacts with the human characters or is shown swimming along. Conti stated that using real dolphins does not work as well as many might think. Nevertheless, a trio of real dolphins did interact with star Elijah Wood during production, with Wood saying that he enjoyed the opportunity to swim with them.

== Reception ==
=== Box office ===
The film debuted at number 2 at the US box office behind Twister with $4.5 million. Flipper ultimately grossed $20.1 million in the United States and Canada and $35.5 million worldwide on a $25 million budget.

=== Critical response ===
Joe Leydon of Variety criticized the plot, but appreciated the performances of Hogan, Wood, Wesson, Hayes and Field, as well as the animatronic work on the film. Dwayne E. Leslie of Boxoffice noted the scene where a hammerhead shark attacks a seabird, which brings to mind similar footage from National Geographic, may be shocking for very young children.

Rotten Tomatoes gives the film a 30% approval rating based on reviews from 20 critics. On Metacritic, it has a score of 43% based on reviews from 19 critics, indicating "mixed or average" reviews. Audiences surveyed by CinemaScore gave the film a grade of "A−" on a scale of A+ to F.

=== Accolades ===
Award	Category	Subject	Result
Kids' Choice Award	Favorite Animal Star	Flipper	Nominated
Stinkers Bad Movie Awards	Worst Resurrection of a TV Show		Nominated
Young Artist Awards	Best Family Feature - Drama		Nominated
Young Artist Awards	Best Performance in a Feature Film - Supporting Young Actress	Jessica Wesson	Nominated
YoungStar Award	Best Performance by a Young Actor in a Comedy Film	Elijah Wood	Nominated

The film's tagline, "This summer it's finally safe to go back in the water," references the tagline of the 1978 feature film Jaws 2, "Just when you thought it was safe to go back in the water..."

== Home media ==
Flipper was first released on VHS on October 8, 1996. The film was then released on DVD in 2003 by Universal Studios Home Entertainment, available in both 16x9 anamorphic widescreen and 4x3 fullscreen editions. In 2007, a widescreen-only print of Flipper was released in a four-film package alongside The Little Rascals, Casper, and Leave It to Beaver. Dubbed "Family Favorites 4 Movie Collection: Franchise Collection", all four films are based on popular TV shows. Flipper was later released on Blu-ray on February 8, 2011.
