= Clarence, the Cross-Eyed Lion =

1965 film

- Theatrical release half-sheet poster
- Directed by: Andrew Marton
- Written by: Art Arthur, Alan Caillou and Marshall Thompson
- Produced by: Ivan Tors; Leonard B. Kaufman; Harry Redmond Jr.
- Starring: Marshall Thompson; Betsy Drake; Richard Haydn; Cheryl Miller; Alan Caillou
- Cinematography: Lamar Boren
- Music by: Al Mack
- Distributed by: Metro-Goldwyn-Mayer
- Release date: August 4, 1965
- Running time: 92 minutes
- Country: United States
- Language: English

Clarence, the Cross-Eyed Lion is a 1965 light comedy-adventure film, produced by Ivan Tors, Leonard B. Kaufman, and Harry Redmond Jr., directed by Andrew Marton, and starring Marshall Thompson and Betsy Drake. The film was shot at Soledad Canyon, California, and in Miami, Florida. It became the basis for the television series Daktari.

== Plot ==
Paula Tracey, an adventurous and fearless girl, is the daughter of veterinarian Dr. Marsh Tracey. Dr. Tracey is the director of East Africa's animal hospital and nature preserve. He fights to protect all African wildlife, while studying and caring for injured animals and endangered species. Dr Tracey was based on Dr AM Harthoorn, who with a team invented the capture gun for animals, and ran an animal orphanage outside Nairobi. Ivan Tors, the Hollywood producer, visited the orphanage and was inspired to write the Daktari series. Daktari means doctor' in Swahili. it was the name given to Harthoorn by the local people.

Paula and her father find Clarence, a wild lion who is cross-eyed. His eyesight problems make hunting in the wild impossible, and they adopt him as a new member of their wildlife preserve. Clarence later saves the day when Julie Harper and her research gorillas are threatened by poachers.

== Cast ==
- Marshall Thompson as Dr. Marsh Tracy
- Betsy Drake as Julie Harper
- Richard Haydn as Rupert Rowbotham
- Cheryl Miller as Paula Tracy
- Alan Caillou as Carter
- Rockne Tarkington as Juma
- Maurice Marsac as Gregory
- Robert DoQui as Sergeant
- Albert Amos as Husseini
- Dinny Powell as Dinny
- Mark Allen as Larson
- Laurence Conroy as Tourist
- Allyson Daniell as Tourist's Wife
- Janee Michelle as Girl In Pit
- Naaman Brown
- Napoleon Whiting as Villager
- Chester Jones as Old Man

=== Animals ===
- Clarence the Lion
- Doris the Chimpanzee
- Mary Lou the Python

== Media ==
Clarence the Lion was the subject of an article in the 25 September 1964 issue of LIFE.
