= Brian Kelly (actor) =

American actor (1931–2005)

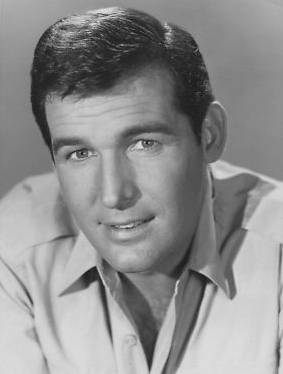
- Kelly, circa 1966
- Born: February 14, 1931; Detroit, Michigan, U.S.
- Died: February 12, 2005 (aged 73); Voorhees Township, New Jersey, U.S.
- Resting place: New Jersey, U.S.
- Education: University of Notre Dame (1953); University of Michigan Law School
- Occupations: Actor; producer
- Years active: 1958–1996
- Spouses: Laura Devon (m. 1962; div. 1966) Valerie Anne Romero (m. 1973)
- Children: 2
- Parent: Harry F. Kelly
- Relatives: Brian d'Arcy James (nephew)

Brian Kelly (February 14, 1931 – February 12, 2005) was an American actor and producer widely known for his role as Porter Ricks, the widowed father of two sons on the NBC television series Flipper.

== Early years ==
Kelly was born in Detroit, Michigan, the son of Republican governor of Michigan Harry F. Kelly (who was also chief justice of Michigan's Supreme Court). His nephew (sister's son) is actor Brian d'Arcy James. He was of Irish descent.

Kelly attended St. Mary High School and served in the United States Marine Corps during the Korean War. Kelly graduated in 1953 from the University of Notre Dame in South Bend, Indiana. He attended the University of Michigan Law School in Ann Arbor for a year before settling on acting. During his college years, Kelly modelled and acted in radio and television commercials in Detroit.

== Acting career ==
Kelly headed to Hollywood in the late fifties after choosing acting as his career. Following minor roles in Adventures in Paradise, The Beverly Hillbillies, and The Rifleman, Kelly starred in two television series, NBC's 21 Beacon Street (1959), with Dennis Morgan and Joanna Barnes, and ABC's Straightaway (1961-1962) with John Ashley.

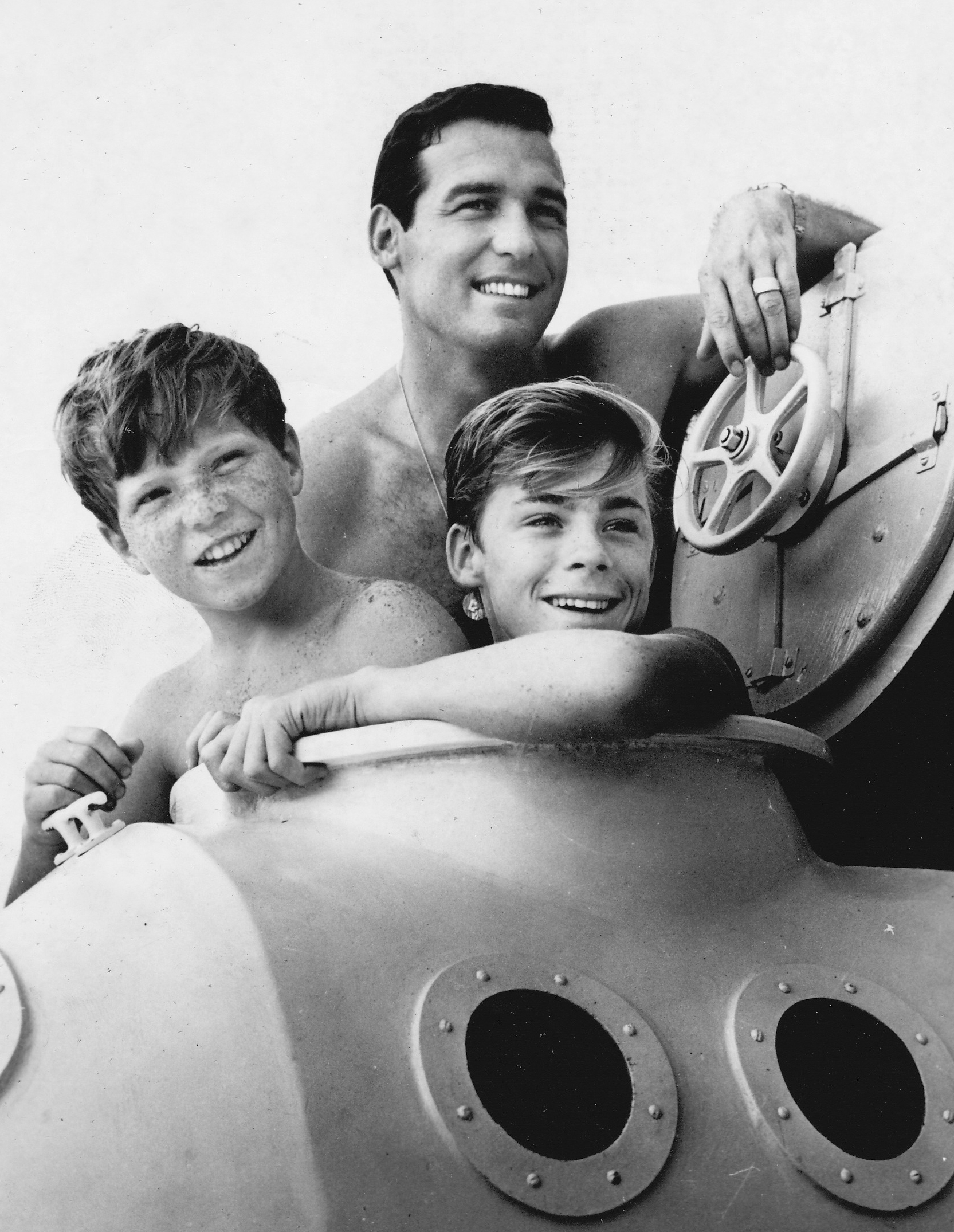
Kelly with Tommy Norden (left) and Luke Halpin (right) in Flipper, 1964

In 1964, Kelly took over the Chuck Connors role from the 1963 family film Flipper, playing Porter Ricks, Chief Warden at Coral Key Park and Marine Preserve and recently widowed father of Sandy Ricks (Luke Halpin) in the 1964 sequel Flipper's New Adventure. He continued the role in the family-oriented action and adventure television program Flipper that same year. In the TV series, Porter would also have a second son, Bud (Tommy Norden). Kelly was quoted at the time as saying that he loved the role because of its family-friendly qualities. The success of Flipper, which was filmed in Miami and the Bahamas, led to a brief movie career, including a lead in Around the World Under the Sea (1966).

In 1970, Kelly sought to change his image by playing the role of Robin Stone in The Love Machine, based on the novel by Jacqueline Susann. Just prior to filming, he was involved in a motorcycle accident which left his right arm and leg paralyzed. John Phillip Law took over the role. Kelly—whom Susann had called "the perfect Robin Stone"—won a legal settlement in the case but the accident ended his acting career.

He used money from the settlement to build homes and then to produce films. He served as executive producer of Blade Runner (1982) and associate producer of Cities of the Wild (1996).

== Marriages and death ==
In 1966, Kelly married actress Laura Devon In 1972, he married Valerie Ann Romero.

On February 12, 2005, two days before his 74th birthday, Kelly died of pneumonia in Voorhees, New Jersey. He was survived by his daughter, Hallie, and his son, Devon, and extended family including two brothers, two sisters, and a granddaughter.

== Filmography ==
=== Film ===
Year	Title	Role	Notes
1963	Thunder Island	Vincent Dodge	
1964	Flipper's New Adventure	Porter Ricks	
1966	Around the World Under the Sea	Dr. Craig Mosby	
1968	Shoot, Gringo... Shoot!	Chad Stark	
1982	Blade Runner	N/A	Executive Producer

=== Television ===
Year	Title	Role	Notes
1958	Panic!	Randy Burke	Episode: "Fingerprints"
1958	Flight		Episode: "Mercy Commando"
1959	21 Beacon Street	Brian	13 episodes
1959	Adventures in Paradise	Captain Rivers	Episode: "The Haunted"
1960	Insight	Father Bergen	Episode: "Fisher of Men"
1961–1962	Straightaway	Scott Ross	Series regular, one season (26 episodes)
1963	The Beverly Hillbillies	2nd Policeman / Officer Kelly	2 episodes
1964–1967	Flipper	Porter Ricks	88 episodes; nominated-TV Land Award for Favorite Pet-Human Relationship (2003)
1970	Drive Hard, Drive Fast	Mark Driscoll	TV movie
1970	Company of Killers	Nick Andros	TV movie
1970	Berlin Affair	Paul Strand	TV movie (final film role)
