= Mr. No Legs =

- Film poster
- Directed by: Ricou Browning
- Written by: Jack Cowden
- Produced by: George Roberts
- Starring: Richard Jaeckel; Ron Slinker; Lloyd Bochner; Ted Vollrath
- Cinematography: Paul Rubinstein
- Edited by: Oscar Barber; Angelo Ross
- Release date: 14 March 1978
- Running time: 90 minutes
- Country: United States
- Language: English

Mr. No Legs (also known as The Amazing Mr. No Legs, Gun Fighter and The Infernal Pursuit) is a 1978 American crime action film directed by Ricou Browning, written by Jack Cowden, and starring Richard Jaeckel, Ron Slinker, Lloyd Bochner, Ted Vollrath, Rance Howard, Luke Halpin and John Agar. It was released theatrically on March 14, 1978.

== Premise ==
When Andy's sister's death is staged to look like an overdose, Andy and fellow policeman Chuck investigate the situation and link it to a drug importing ring involving Florida drug kingpin D'Angelo and his enforcer Mr. No Legs, who uses a wheelchair and is armed with two shotguns built into his chair armrests.

== Cast ==
- Richard Jaeckel as Chuck
- Ron Slinker as Andy
- Lloyd Bochner as D'Angelo
- Ted Vollrath as Mr. No Legs
- Rance Howard as Lou, Mr. No Legs' sidekick
- Luke Halpin as Ken Wilson
- John Agar as Police Capt. Hathaway

== Production ==
Director Ricou Browning and screenwriter Jack Cowden were previously co-creators of the 1960s TV series Flipper.

Director Ricou Browning would later recall how he got involved in the film, saying "The producer called me and asked if I would be interested in working on a film with him. I said 'Yep' and went over and met with him. He said, '...we have an idea for a script and a story and we would like you to get involved.' I said, 'OK I'll get Jack Cowden whose [sic] my brother-in-law and helped me write "Flipper", to help write your show.' So Jack went over there and met with him and wrote the screenplay "Mister No Legs." I directed it and brought in a few actors that I knew, and we made that film."

The film features taekwondo sequences, courtesy of the martial artist and real-life double amputee Ted Vollrath, who portrays the title character of Mr. No Legs. Mr. No Legs was filmed in Tampa, Florida in 1975 under the working title of Killers Die Hard. Actor John Agar recalled that his check for the film bounced and that he never was paid by the producer. Director Browning also recalled in regards of Ron Slinker that "The actor playing the part of [Andy] was acting for the first time and was a friend of the producer of the film. Richard [Jaeckel] helped him with his acting, showing him all the ropes all the way through the film."

The movie received a marginal release in Europe under the titles of Gun Fighter and Destructor.

== Reception ==
Gene Freese's Richard Jaeckel, Hollywood's Man of Character describes the film as "as evocative of 1970s low-budget action cinema as can be found," and described Jaeckel's role thus: "Despite the low budget, Jaeckel delivers a typically professional performance in which his likable personality shines through as the good cop who looks out for his partner Ron Slinker." The book also collects a review from the website Cult Movie Forums, saying "The always likable Richard Jaeckel is a decent lead."

Clive Davies's Spinegrinder: The Movies Most Critics Won't Write About writes of the film (under the title The Amazing Mr. No Legs) that "This obscurity is awful, but will be enjoyed by fans of bad cinema (and has a great title)."

In a tongue-in-cheek review, Matt Rotman in Bonkers Ass Cinema states that "a cult oddity forever only available on VHS and DVD bootlegs, Mr. No Legs has taunted exploitation fetishists for decades for decades," and jokingly compares its tagline ("Don't cross him or he'll cut you down to size") with the siren's song in the Odyssey, stating "Much like Odysseus spent a lifetime getting home, Flipper creators Ricou Browning and Jack Cowden waited their entire lives to make this film. I'm kidding, of course, but what is Mr. No Legs, if not the obvious product of a passion project—or at the very least, the fulfillment of some destiny willed by the gods themselves? Both men could have lain low, living off that sweet dolphin money, but no. They pooled together their resources, called in every favor, and made...this movie?" Rotman ultimately concludes, "The movie itself is fine. Richard Jaeckel (of The Green Slime fame) add some much-needed charm, for his screen partner, Ron Slinker is a bit of a stinker. [...] Held together by some rather eye-popping set pieces (a race war dust up in a bar with a drag queen and little person comes to mind), Mr. No Legs keeps a nice pace, even rewarding the viewer with a gratuitous, 10-minute car chase. And I mean gratuious literally: the plot has wrapped up completely before the chase begins, rendering the entire affair meaningless. But then again, who am I to complain abour superflous shit?"
