= A Covenant with Death =

1967 film directed by Lamont Johnson

- Film poster
- Directed by: Lamont Johnson
- Written by: Lawrence B. Marcus; Saul Levitt
- Based on: A Covenant with Death; 1964 novel by Stephen Becker
- Starring: George Maharis; Laura Devon; Katy Jurado; Earl Holliman
- Cinematography: Robert Burks
- Edited by: William Ziegler
- Music by: Leonard Rosenman
- Production company: William Conrad Productions
- Distributed by: Warner Bros. Pictures
- Release date: February 15, 1967
- Running time: 97 minutes
- Country: United States
- Languages: English; Spanish

A Covenant with Death is a 1967 American legal drama film directed by Lamont Johnson (in his feature directorial debut), with a screenplay by Lawrence B. Marcus and Saul Levitt based on the 1964 Book of the Month novel of the same title by Stephen Becker. The film stars George Maharis, Laura Devon, Katy Jurado and Earl Holliman.

== Plot ==
Within a small American town on the Mexican border in 1923, a promiscuous, married woman is found dead in her bedroom. Her grieving, jealous and widely disliked husband Bryan Talbot is convicted of her murder and sentenced to hang on purely circumstantial evidence despite his fierce denials. The presiding judge, Hochstadter, departs for a fishing trip, leaving it to the inexperienced Mexican-American judge Ben Morealis Lewis to oversee the execution. Lewis has misgivings about mandatory sentencing and capital punishment in general, as well as about Talbot's guilt.

Talbot unintentionally kills his executioner while trying to avoid being hanged. Before a replacement hangman arrives, another man confesses to killing Talbot's wife. Judge Lewis must negotiate various personal relationships, provincial attitudes and his faith in justice.

== Cast ==
- George Maharis as Benjamin "Ben" Lewis
- Laura Devon as Rosemary
- Katy Jurado as Eulalia Lewis
- Earl Holliman as Bryan Talbot
- Sidney Blackmer as Sebastian Oates
- Gene Hackman as Alfred Harmsworth
- John Anderson as Dietrich
- Wende Wagner as Rafaela Montemayor
- Emilio Fernández as Ignacio Montemayor
- Kent Smith as Oliver Parmelee
- Lonny Chapman as Edgar Musgrave
- Arthur O'Connell as Judge Hockstadter
- Jose De Vega as John Digby
- Larry D. Mann as George Chillingworth
- Whit Bissell as Bruce Donnelly
- Russell Thorson as Doctor Shilling
- Erwin Neal as Willie Wayte
- Jadeen Vaughn as Louise Talbot
- Paul Birch as Governor
- Robert Dunlap as Tolliver
- Kelton Garwood as Mr. Moody

== Production ==
In early 1966, Stephen Becker's novel "A Covenant with Death" was assigned to William Conrad's new production company within Warner Bros. for adaptation to the screen, along with An American Dream by Norman Mailer and Speak Not Evil by Edwin Lanham.

Filming began in May 1966 with six days of shooting on location in New Mexico followed by six weeks of interior filming at the Warner Bros. studios. Most of the New Mexico filming occurred at a historic ranch near the Black Mesa, north of Santa Fe. Approximately 70 local extras were employed as well as more than 50 Indians from the San Ildefonso Pueblo.

Katy Jurado gained 25 pounds for her role and entered a hospital as soon as filming wrapped in order to lose the weight.

== Reception ==
In a contemporary review for The New York Times, critic Howard Thompson wrote: "A genuinely original idea for a drama weighing justice, prejudice and the human conscience is studiously frittered away ... [T]he film itself slips in to a devious, figure-eight treatment, siphoning out the action and even the characterizations."
