= Jose De Vega =

American dancer and choreographer

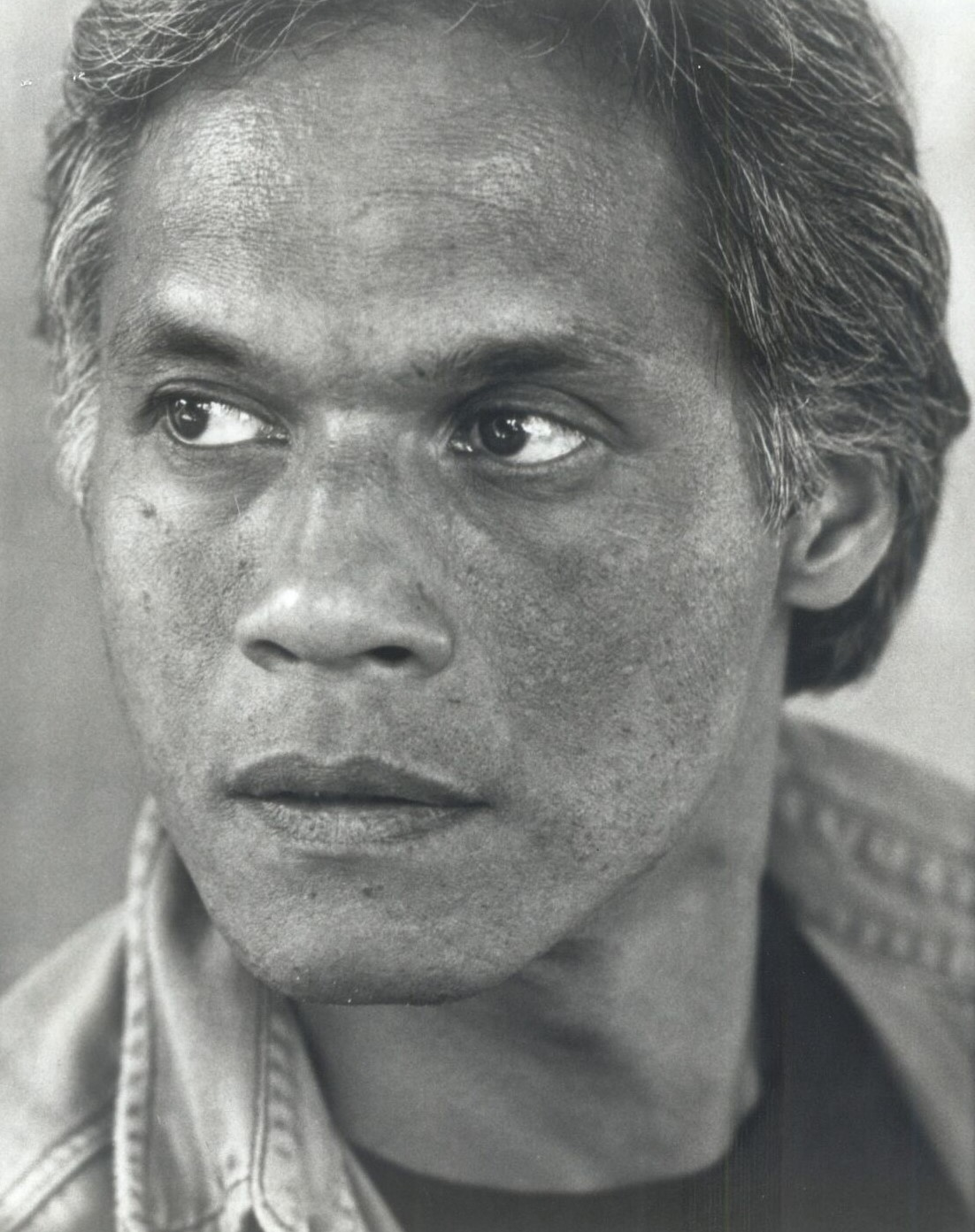
- Jose De Vega c.1986
- Born: José De Vega Jr. January 4, 1934; San Diego, California, U.S.
- Died: April 8, 1990 (aged 56); Westwood, Los Angeles, California, U.S.
- Occupation: Actor
- Known for: Dance and choreography
- Movement: Modern/contemporary dance

José De Vega Jr. (January 4, 1934 – April 8, 1990) was an American actor, choreographer, and advocate for eliminating ethnic stereotypes in the entertainment industry. He was known for his role as Chino in both the Broadway and 1961 film versions of West Side Story and for his work with Great Leap, a Los Angeles-based group of Asian-American artists.

== Early life and family ==
José De Vega Jr. was born in San Diego, California, to a Filipino father, José De Vega Sr. (1904–1974), who worked in the U.S. Navy, and a Colombian mother, Socorro De Vega (née Barbosa) (1909–1999). He had one sister, Isabel De Vega Gorre (1936–2005). He attended San Diego High School.

== Career ==
Early in his career, he was cast in the original 1957 Broadway production of West Side Story as a replacement for the character Juano and also as an understudy and then replacement for the role of Chino, the best friend of the Sharks' leader, Bernardo. In 1958 he performed in Hawaii and was cast as a principal actor and featured dancer in the 1958 production of The Music Man at Dillingham Hall He was asked to reprise the role of Chino for the 1961 film adaptation of West Side Story and also played the role on the London stage and in Japan.

De Vega's next film role was in 1961 in Blue Hawaii as Ernie Gordon, a friend of Elvis Presley's character Chad Gates. The author Camilla Fojas noted that De Vega "adopted various cross-ethnic and racialized roles in Hollywood films and television" when examining and comparing his roles in West Side Story and Blue Hawaii. Other film credits included parts in Island of the Lost (1967), A Covenant with Death (1967), and Ash Wednesday (1973). He also made appearances in various popular television series, such as "The High Chaparral",Bonanza, Wagon Train, Dynasty, Mission Impossible and Hart to Hart.

In the late 1970s he spent four years with the Modern Dance Company of Rome (Danza Contemporania Di Roma). returning to the US in 1981. He then began to play a significant role in productions by Great Leap in Santa Monica, with whom he had been associated since its founding in 1978 a collective of Asian-American artists working to eliminate ethnic stereotypes in entertainment. He remained associated with the group until his death.

In 1986, De Vega choreographed a major dance scene for Karate Kid II which would prove to be his last film. He and Nobuko Miyamoto conceived the performance Talk Story following on from their musical and choreographic contributions to Karate Kid II. Talk Story was staged at the Los Angeles Theatre Center in 1989.

== Death ==
De Vega died on April 8, 1990, at Veterans Memorial Hospital in Westwood, Los Angeles, at the age of 56, due to complications from AIDS.

== Filmography ==
- West Side Story (1961) as Chino
- Flower Drum Song (1961) as Dancer (uncredited)
- Blue Hawaii (1961) as Ernie Gordon
- A Covenant with Death (1967) as Digby
- Island of the Lost (1967) as Tupuna
- Ash Wednesday (1973) as Tony Gutierrez
