= Flipper's New Adventure =

1964 film

- Theatrical release poster
- Directed by: Leon Benson
- Screenplay by: Art Arthur
- Story by: Ivan Tors
- Based on: Flipper by Arthur Weiss; Ricou Browning; Jack Cowden
- Produced by: Ivan Tors
- Starring: Luke Halpin; Pamela Franklin; Tom Helmore; Brian Kelly
- Cinematography: Lamar Boren
- Edited by: Warren Adams; Charles Craft
- Music by: Henry Vars
- Production company: Ivan Tors Productions
- Distributed by: Metro-Goldwyn-Mayer
- Release date: June 24, 1964
- Running time: 94 minutes
- Country: United States
- Language: English
- Box office: $1.6 Million (US/ Canada)

Flipper's New Adventure (known in some countries as Flipper and the Pirates) is a 1964 American feature film released on June 24, 1964 by Metro-Goldwyn-Mayer, written by Art Arthur, and directed by Leon Benson. A sequel to the 1963 film Flipper, it was based on characters created by Ricou Browning and Jack Cowden. The famous "voice" of Flipper was actually the sped-up song of a kookaburra, "dolphins have no vocal chords -- the noise they make comes through their blowhole".

The film, released before the TV series premiered, received good reviews and outdid the first film with more audience attendance.

== Plot ==
Sandy Ricks is asked to vacate his home to make way for a new highway but runs away to keep his pet dolphin Flipper from being taken. His dad, Porter, widowed since the prior film, returns from park ranger school to search for Sandy but doesn't realize his son has fled in their skiff motorboat to the Bahamas. On the way, Sandy runs out of food, water and gas. Flipper helps by towing the skiff to a seemingly deserted island. Just as Sandy is establishing himself with food and fresh water on the island, and has found a cave to hide from aerial search patrols, he witnesses the holidaying British family of Sir Halsey Hopewell being taken hostage by recently escaped convicts. The mother, Julia, and two daughters, Gwen and Penny, are forced into a small boat and told to row to the nearby island where Sandy is hiding.

Julia Hopewell, Gwen, and Penny struggle to find food to survive; Sandy finds ways (with the help of Flipper) to get fish, matches, and other items to the Hopewells without being discovered. This lasts until Sandy accidentally meets and then befriends the younger of the two daughters, Penny. Sandy and Penny form an innocent romantic attachment as Sandy shows her around his new island paradise and secretly helps her behind her sister's and mother's backs. Sandy shows Penny how to cut down and husk coconuts, light fires, and weave fish nets. The happy friendship seemingly comes to an end when Sandy, afraid that rescuers of the Hopewells will discover him and Flipper and make them return to the Keys and be separated, sends Flipper to douse the Hopewells' rescue fire. Penny is angry and tells Sandy to stay away. Sandy tries to make up by placing fish, cans of food, a can opener, and a flashlight into their nets.

Soon after, the convicts come back for the mother and daughters, and Mr. Hopewell is made to radio the nearest Coast Guard station in Puerto Rico that he and his family are hostages; soon thereafter, Sir Halsey, Julia, Penny and Gwen are tied up by the convicts. Sandy and Flipper make a plan to rescue the Hopewell family from the convicts. Sandy distracts the convicts by releasing much-needed cans of food and luring one of the convicts into a row boat to retrieve the cans; Flipper tips the boat over and rams the convict in the stomach, knocking him out. (This was a surprise, and was a case where "the animal read the script".) Sandy and Flipper grab him and leave him in a hidden cave. Sandy frees Sir Halsey, and through various ruses Sandy manages to get the remaining two convicts into the water. The second one is captured in the same way as the first, and the leader fights hard with a knife to fend off Flipper. Eventually he is overcome and Sandy is able to tie him to the boat hull, and Sandy helps Sir Halsey untie Julia, Penny and Gwen. However, the convict leader has managed to stab Flipper near his tail in his frantic attempts to escape, and Flipper is washed up bleeding and injured on the beach. Sandy sobs as he holds his injured friend, while Sir Halsey radios that they are safe and calls for a vet to care for an injured dolphin. Flipper is nursed back to health at the Miami Seaquarium, where Porter has returned to announce his assignment as a park ranger to the Coral Key Marine Preserve; he tells Sandy that will be Flipper’s new home once he recovers.

== Cast ==
- Luke Halpin as Sandy Ricks
- Pamela Franklin as Penny Hopewell
- Tom Helmore as Sir Halsey Hopewell
- Brian Kelly as Porter Ricks
- Helen Cherry as Julia Hopewell
- Francesca Annis as Gwen Hopewell
- Lloyd Battista as Gil Bates (outlaw)
- Joe Higgins as L.C. Porett

== Soundtrack ==
- "Always" and "Imagine", 7" sung by Chris Crosby, lyrics Dunham, music Henry Vars 1964
