= Mark Slade =

American actor

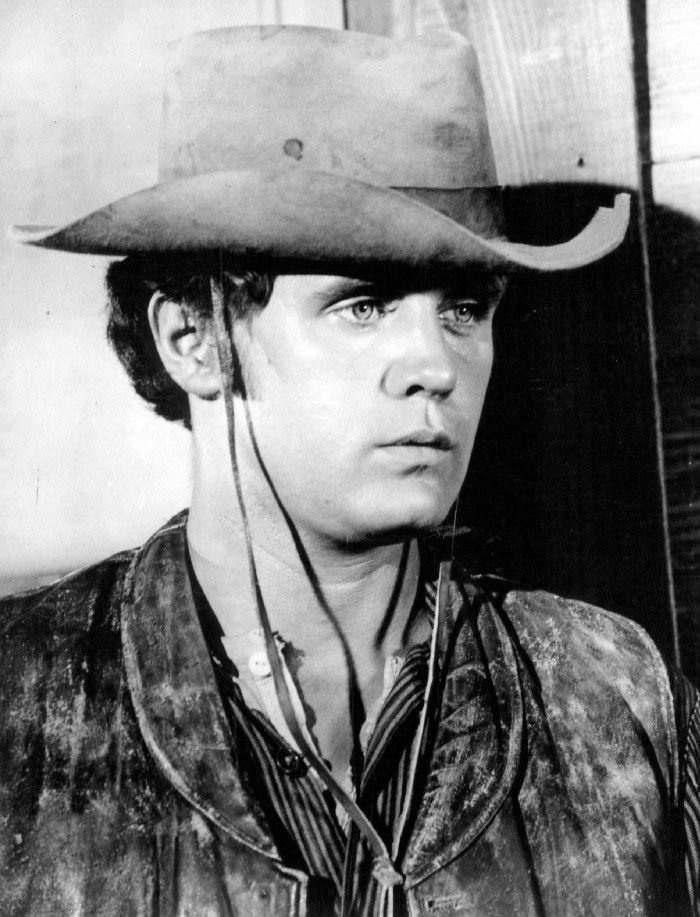
- Slade as Billy Blue Cannon in The High Chaparral (1968)
- Born: Mark Van Blarcom Slade; May 1, 1939 (age 87); Salem, Massachusetts, U.S.
- Occupations: Actor; artist; author
- Years active: 1961–present
- Spouse: Melinda Riccilli (m. 1968)
- Children: 2
- Website: marksladestudio.com

Mark Van Blarcom Slade (born May 1, 1939) is a retired American actor, artist, and author, particularly remembered for his role of Billy Blue Cannon on the NBC Western television series The High Chaparral.

== Early life ==
Born in Salem, Massachusetts, Slade is the son of Elinor (née Van Blarcom) and William A. Slade Jr., a Boston businessman and watercolor artist. Along with his two sisters and a brother, he grew up in the Danvers/Hamilton area of the North Shore. His parents divorced when he was 13, and his stepfather, Esmond R. Crowley Jr., became a positive influence on his life.

In 1956, he enrolled in Worcester Academy with the intention of becoming an artist. After he filled in for a sick classmate by playing the role of an English professor in the play The Male Animal, he decided to study acting. Slade moved to New York City to attend the American Academy of Dramatic Arts, supporting himself by working at the 21 Club.

During the beginning of his career in the early 1960s, Slade served in the United States Army Reserve.

== Career ==
=== Actor ===
Slade began his career on the Broadway stage appearing in the play There Was a Little Girl, directed by Joshua Logan; it was Jane Fonda's first Broadway play. Slade then earned a role in the 1961 film Splendor in the Grass, directed by Elia Kazan and filmed in upstate New York. In the early 1960s, he moved to the West Coast, where he was cast as Seaman Jimmy "Red" Smith in the feature film Voyage to the Bottom of the Sea (1961). Despite his character being killed in the movie version, Irwin Allen brought Slade back for the TV series on ABC. He was cast in 1964 as a new character, Seaman Malone. He was hence the only one of six actors to have been cast in both the film and television versions of Voyage to the Bottom of the Sea. He appeared only in the first half of the first season because he departed to become a semi-regular, Eddie, in the CBS sitcom Gomer Pyle - U.S.M.C., starring Jim Nabors. Slade appeared in eight episodes of Gomer Pyle, all of which were aired during the first half of the first season. He was cast in three episodes of the NBC education drama Mr. Novak, starring James Franciscus in the title role. His first television role was as Stu Walters in the 1961 episode "Deadline" of the ABC sitcom My Three Sons, starring Fred MacMurray. In 1963, he was cast in the episode "A Girl Named Amy" of Jack Lord's ABC series Stoney Burke, a rodeo adventure series. In 1964, he guest-starred in "The Enormous Fist" episode of Rawhide opposite Eric Fleming and Clint Eastwood. That year, he also appeared as the title character Michael Manning, alias Michael Da Vinci, in the Perry Mason episode, "The Case of the Careless Kidnapper".

In the 1965–1966 television season, Slade played Radioman Patrick Hollis in the NBC sitcom The Wackiest Ship in the Army.

In 1966, at the age of 27, he obtained one of his most memorable parts, as Billy Blue Cannon, the blond-haired, blue-eyed son of the ranch patriarch, John Cannon (Leif Erickson) on The High Chaparral, set in the Arizona Territory. The series aired for four seasons. In the same year he was cast in an episode of the western TV series Bonanza as Jud Rikeman.

He went on to play Taylor Reed in the 1973 film Salty and reprised his role in the syndicated adventure series Salty (1974–1975).

Slade's acting career continued into the early 1990s. He made more than 300 appearances on stage, screen, and television. Slade won international recognition and numerous awards for his efforts: the Belgian Viewers Award, the Bambi, the Bravo Golden Otto, and the Western Heritage Award.

=== Artist ===
As an artist, Slade's illustrations, political cartoons, caricatures, and comic strips have run in numerous newspapers, magazines, and prominent publications around the world. His collaboration with producer/writer Danny Arnold (Barney Miller television series) resulted in the long-running comic strip, "Howard and Friends".

A number of his later works done in oils and graphite, as well as his hand-pulled prints, are held in private collections.

=== Writer ===
As a writer, Slade earned critical notice for scripting the “Cliffy” episode of The Rookies, in which he also guest starred, and later published several books, including the novels Going Down Maine (2012), Hangin’ with the Truth (2016), and Don’t Call Me Slye (2024), along with two illustrated collections. He also worked on writing and development projects for the Slade Media Group and its affiliated Slade Square Productions, which produced corporate communications and media projects.

== Personal life ==
Slade married Melinda Riccilli in 1968. They have two sons, Morgan and Mitchel. He is currently living in Northern California, where he continues the pursuit of his artistic endeavors.

Slade's maternal grandmother, Alice Louise (née Ford) Van Blarcom, was Henry Ford's fifth cousin. His Ford lineage goes back to Martha and John Ford, who reached Plymouth, Massachusetts, on the Fortune, the second English ship to arrive in Plymouth Colony, on November 9, 1621. John Ford died on the voyage. Martha disembarked with their two sons and gave birth to their third on the same day. The ship's manifest lists among the passengers a John Cannon, also the name of the patriarch in The High Chaparral.
