= Newt Perry =

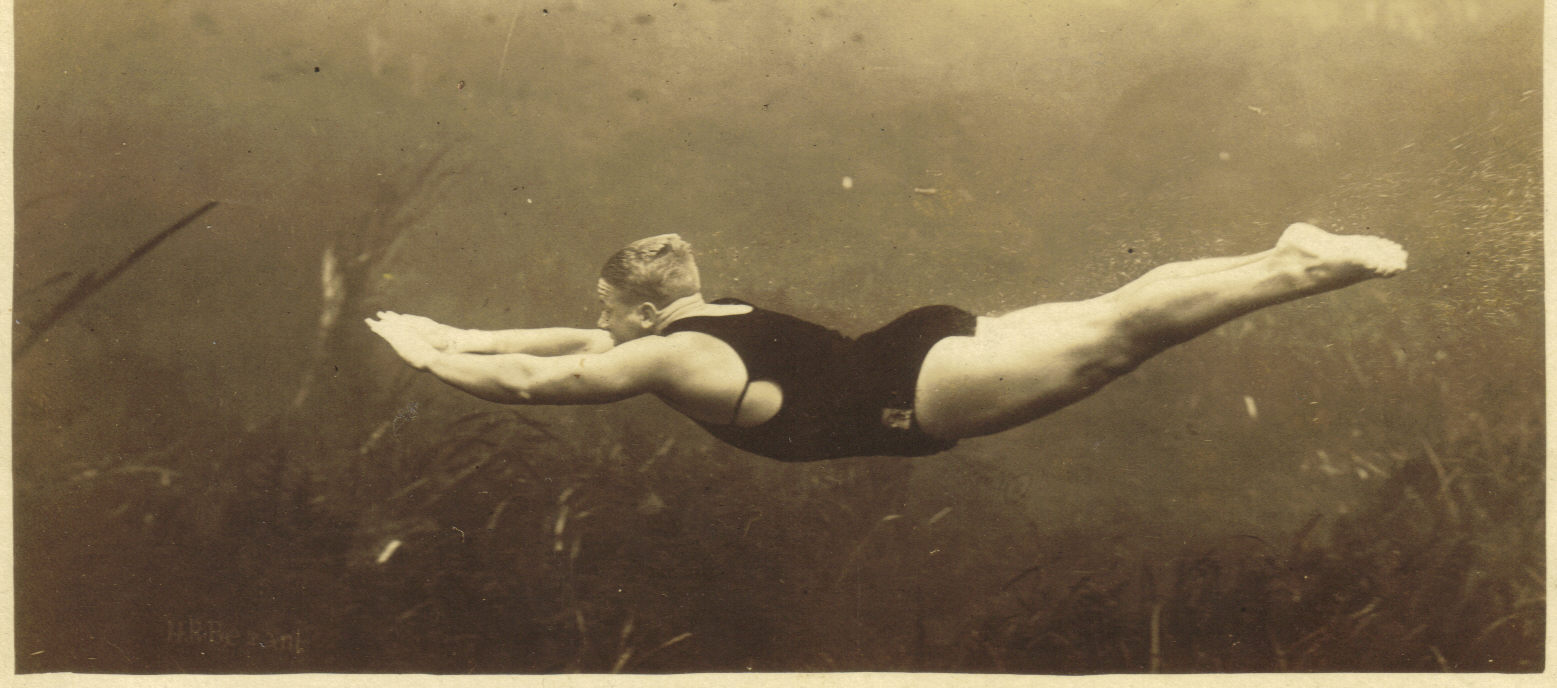
- Underwater photograph of Newt Perry in 1924
- Born: January 6, 1908; Valdosta, Georgia, US
- Died: November 22, 1987 (aged 79); Ocala, Florida, US
- Education: University of Florida, B.A., M.A.
- Occupations: Swimming coach, promoter, teacher, movie consultant
- Spouse(s): Margaret Jarman (1934-47); Dorothy "Dot" Roederer (1950-82)
- Children: 3

Newton A. Perry (January 6, 1908 – November 22, 1987) was an American swimmer, attraction promoter, educator and swimming coach.

== Early life ==
Perry was born in Valdosta, Georgia, in 1908. After living in Tampa for several years, he and his family moved to the Ocala, Florida area in 1922. His father was a railroad conductor, and Ocala represented the midpoint of his train route. Perry was happy to discover that he could swim in the clean, clear water at Silver Springs, and he would walk the six miles from Ocala to the springs. In order to earn pocket change, he started teaching local residents to swim for twenty-five cents per lesson. In 1924, Perry became Ocala High School's swim coach and star swimmer; he was only 16 years old at the time. He once swam 25 miles in seven hours, 28 minutes.

Perry attended the University of Florida in nearby Gainesville, and was a member of the Florida Gators swimming and diving team in 1933 and 1934. He graduated from the university with a bachelor's degree in education, and later returned to complete a master's degree in education in 1958.

== Career ==
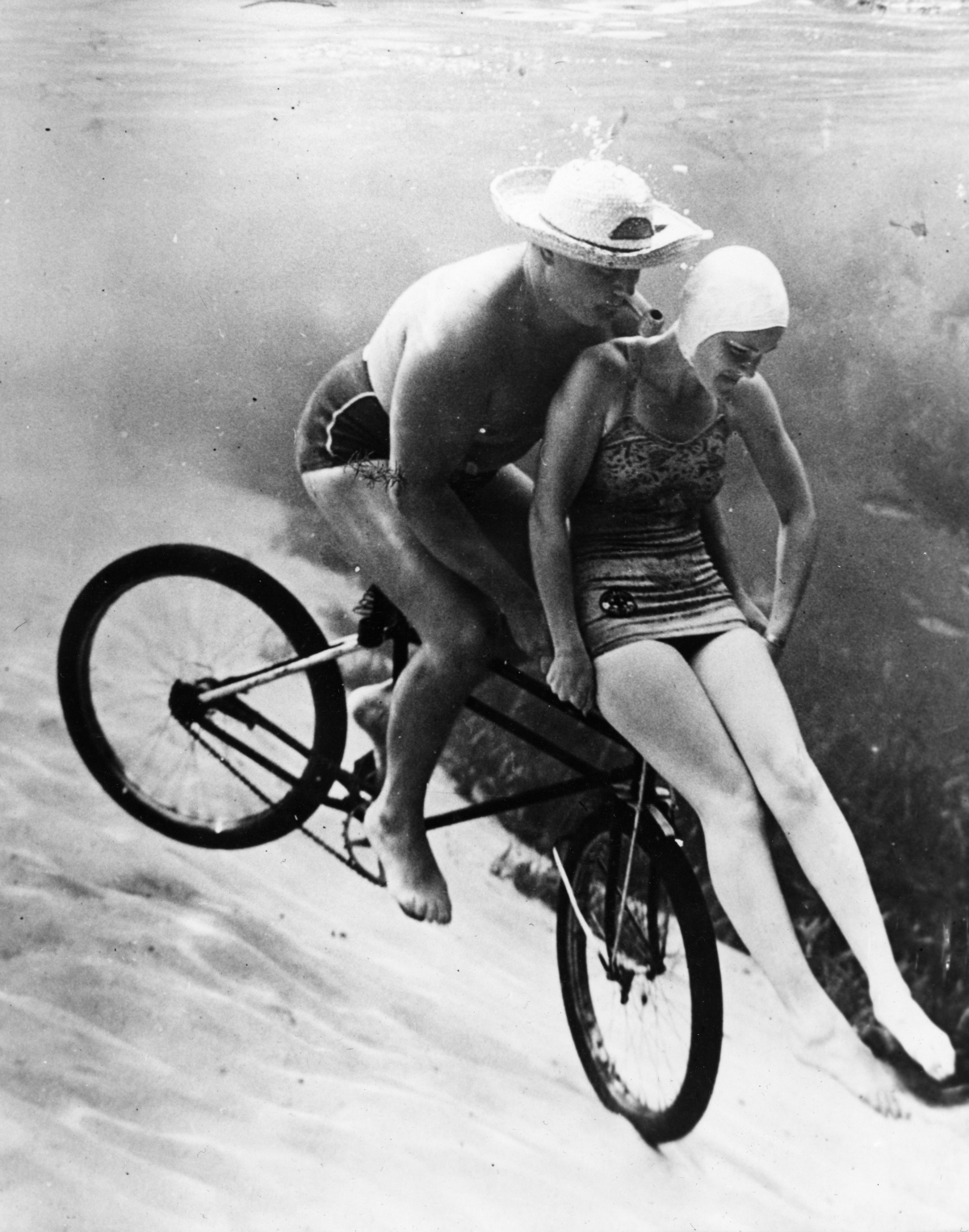
Newton Perry riding a bicycle underwater with Edith Allen Landt at Silver Springs.

Perry learned all he could about swimming, diving and life-guarding. When the American Red Cross published their aquatics safety manual during the 1920s, they selected Silver Springs to shoot the underwater photographs for their manuals. Perry served as the model in many of the Red Cross manual photographs.

Silver Springs in the 1920s and 1930s was not that well known and the attraction owners, Carl G. Ray, Sr. and W. M. "Shorty" Davidson, would invite journalists from all over the country to come visit their attraction. Perry and his sisters would put on swimming exhibitions both the water's surface and under it. Some of those snapshots would appear in newspapers in Atlanta, Washington, D.C., New York, Jacksonville, Tampa, and other large cities. Life magazine published several articles on Silver Springs and the Perry family.

Ray and Davidson invited American sportswriter and short movie producer, Grantland Rice, to vacation in the Ocala area and to be their guest on a tour of Silver Springs. While Rice was visiting the springs, he witnessed the aquatic abilities of Perry and was interested in what he saw. Rice set up his motion picture cameras to record the interesting footage of the swimmer both on the surface and under the surface of the water. Perry demonstrated his powerful freestyle up stream and then dove underwater to perform swimming backwards, somersaults, eating a banana, drinking a soda and other unusual underwater skills. He had stayed underwater for three minutes and 45 seconds.

Over the next thirty years, Perry helped produce over 150 of Grantland Rice's "Sportlight" series short films. These films were human interest stories about fifteen minutes in length, which were shown before the featured movies at theaters across the country. The subjects included different themes like picnics, weddings, school rooms, track meets, night clubs with bands, and bartenders among other story lines. Rice once did a reel called "The Human Fish" featuring Perry, and proclaimed him as the "best swimmer in America."

Perry became a go-to consultant for Hollywood movies that involved on-location water scenes, and Florida's crystal-clear spring waters provided nearly ideal underwater filming locations. He played a significant role in the production of MGM's Tarzan Finds a Son! (1939) at Silver Springs and Tarzan's Secret Treasure (1941) at Wakulla Springs through his relationship with actor-swimmer Johnny Weissmuller who played Tarzan. He also influenced Universal Studio's decision to film the Creature from the Black Lagoon and its sequels at Wakulla Springs and Silver Springs, as well as the hiring of Florida swimmer Ricou Browning to play the Creature in the movie's underwater sequences. He worked with several noted actors including Weissmuller, W.C. Fields, Gary Cooper, Cary Grant, Gregory Peck, Jayne Mansfield, Ann Blyth, Lloyd Bridges.

In 1948, Perry spearheaded the development of the Weeki Wachee Springs attraction, and is credited with performing the first underwater shows there. His daughter Margaret Eileen Perry performed as one of the youngest mermaids ever at the springs in 1948 at age 13. It was later that year that Perry met his future wife Dot. Perry was president of the Florida Attraction Association and attending a convention at Miami Beach. Dot was training for the 1948 U.S. Olympic diving team in one-meter and tower diving. A mutual friend and former Olympic diver, Kathryn Rawls, introduced the two. An instant connection began when Perry climbed to the top of a 10-meter diving platform and started diving, dive for dive, with Dot. Dot found that Perry could do almost anything in the water and that led to a year-long, long-distance romance. Dot had signed with the "Water Follies," a local synchronized swimming act, after failing to qualify for the Olympic diving team. She toured Cuba, Mexico, Central and South America as their star diver.

== Later life ==
After Perry and Dot's wedding in the fall of 1950, they moved to San Marcos, Texas to develop Aquerena Springs, an underwater attraction similar to Weeki Wachee. After completing the development of Aquarena, Perry and his wife returned to Ocala. They founded an instructional swimming school in Ocala that remains in operation today. Perry's most successful swimming student was his nephew, Don Schollander, a five-time Olympic gold medalist at the 1964 and 1968 Summer Olympics.

Perry suffered strokes in 1975 and 1978 that left him partially paralyzed. He was inducted into the Florida Sports Hall of Fame in 1981. He died in Ocala in 1987; he was 79 years old.

== See also ==
- Florida Gators
- List of amusement parks in the Americas
- List of University of Florida alumni

== Bibliography ==
- Hollis, Tim, Glass Bottom Boats & Mermaid Tails: Florida's Tourist Springs, Stackpole Books, Mechanicsburg, Pennsylvania (2006). ISBN 978-0-8117-3266-6.
- Vickers, Lu, and Sara Dionne, Weeki Wachee, City of Mermaids: A History of One of Florida's Oldest Roadside Attractions, University of Florida Press, Gainesville, Florida (2007). ISBN 978-0813030418.
