= Daring Game =

1968 drama film by László Benedek

- Original film poster
- Directed by: László Benedek
- Written by: Art Arthur; Andy White
- Produced by: Gene Levitt; Ivan Tors
- Starring: Lloyd Bridges; Nico Minardos; Michael Ansara; Joan Blackman; Brock Peters; Shepperd Strudwick
- Cinematography: Edmund Gibson
- Edited by: Jack Woelz
- Music by: George Bruns
- Production company: Ivan Tors Productions
- Distributed by: Paramount Pictures
- Release dates: March 19, 1968 (New York City, New York); April 1968 (United States)
- Running time: 100 minutes
- Country: United States
- Language: English

Daring Game is a 1968 action drama film, starring Lloyd Bridges and Nico Minardos, filmed at the Ivan Tors studio in Miami and in the Bahamas. The working title was The Unkillables.

The film features a team of adventurers and martial artists who are hired to rescue a captured scientist. The scientist is held prisoner by a dictator.

== Plot ==
Survival Devices, Inc., is an organization that employs a team of adventurers known as "the Flying Fish" who are adept in sky diving, scuba diving and martial arts. They are engaged to rescue a captured scientist imprisoned on a Caribbean island by a dictator.

The team parachutes off the coast of the island in a HALO jump and establishes an inflatable underwater basecamp in an "Instant Underwater Habitat" or "Igloo".

== Cast ==
- Lloyd Bridges as Vic Powers
- Joan Blackman as Kathryn Carlyle
- Nico Minardos as Ricardo Balboa
- Michael Ansara as President Delgado
- Shepperd Strudwick as Dr. Carlyle
- Brock Peters as Jonah
- Perry Lopez as Reuben

== Production notes ==
A Chase YC-122 Avitruc hired by the producers crashed en route from Fort Lauderdale to Bimini.

Ricou Browning directed the underwater sequences.

== See also ==
- List of American films of 1968
