= Luke Halpin =

American actor

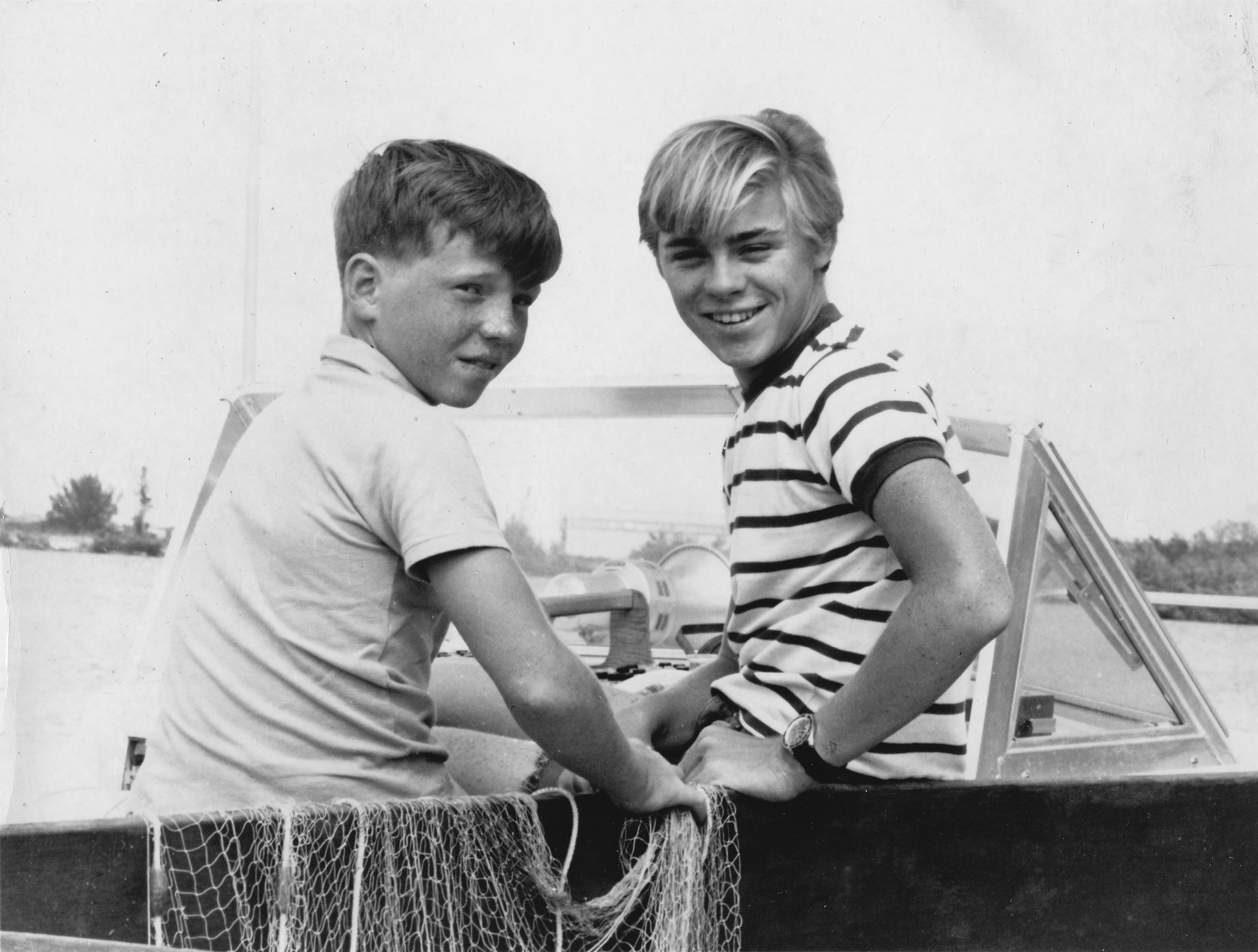
- Luke Halpin, May 1965
- Born: April 4, 1947 (age 79); Astoria, Queens, New York, U.S.
- Occupations: Actor; stuntman; marine coordinator; diver; pilot
- Years active: 1955–2005
- Spouse(s): Patricia Warren Ott (1971-197?) (divorced); Judy Suzanne Meyer (1977-1987) (divorced) 2 children Deborah Jane Durrell (1991-present) 1 child
- Children: Kyle A. Halpin; Blair L. Halpin; Courtney L. Halpin

Luke Halpin is a retired American actor, stuntman, marine coordinator, diver, and pilot. He became a child actor at the age of eight and is widely known for his role as Sandy Ricks in the feature films Flipper and Flipper's New Adventure, as well as for reprising his role for the NBC television series adaptation, Flipper.

== Early life ==
Halpin was born in Astoria, Queens, New York City, the son of Eugene A. Halpin and Helen Joan (Szczepanski) Halpin. His father was of Irish and German descent, and his maternal grandparents were Polish. He grew up with his family in Long Island City. He has an older brother, Eugene Jr., and an older sister, Joan. He and his siblings were raised as Roman Catholics.

== Career ==
=== Early career ===
Halpin's career began when a music teacher, impressed by Halpin's "all-American" look, encouraged him to try acting. In 1955 he co-starred with Natalie Wood in an episode of Studio One entitled "Miracle at Potter's Farm". Numerous roles followed, and by his mid-teens, Halpin had appeared on many of the major TV series of the day: Armstrong Circle Theatre, The United States Steel Hour, Kraft Television Theatre, Hallmark Hall of Fame, The Phil Silvers Show, Harbormaster, The Defenders, Route 66, Naked City, The Everglades, and had a recurring role for six months on the soap opera Young Doctor Malone.

Halpin's early career also included several stage roles. He made his Broadway debut in Take Me Along starring Jackie Gleason, and appeared in Sunrise at Campobello, and with Mary Martin in both Annie Get Your Gun and Peter Pan. Halpin also acted in plays that were televised on The Play of the Week including starring with Broadway luminaries Burgess Meredith and Zero Mostel in the critically acclaimed avant-garde play Waiting for Godot.

=== Flipper ===
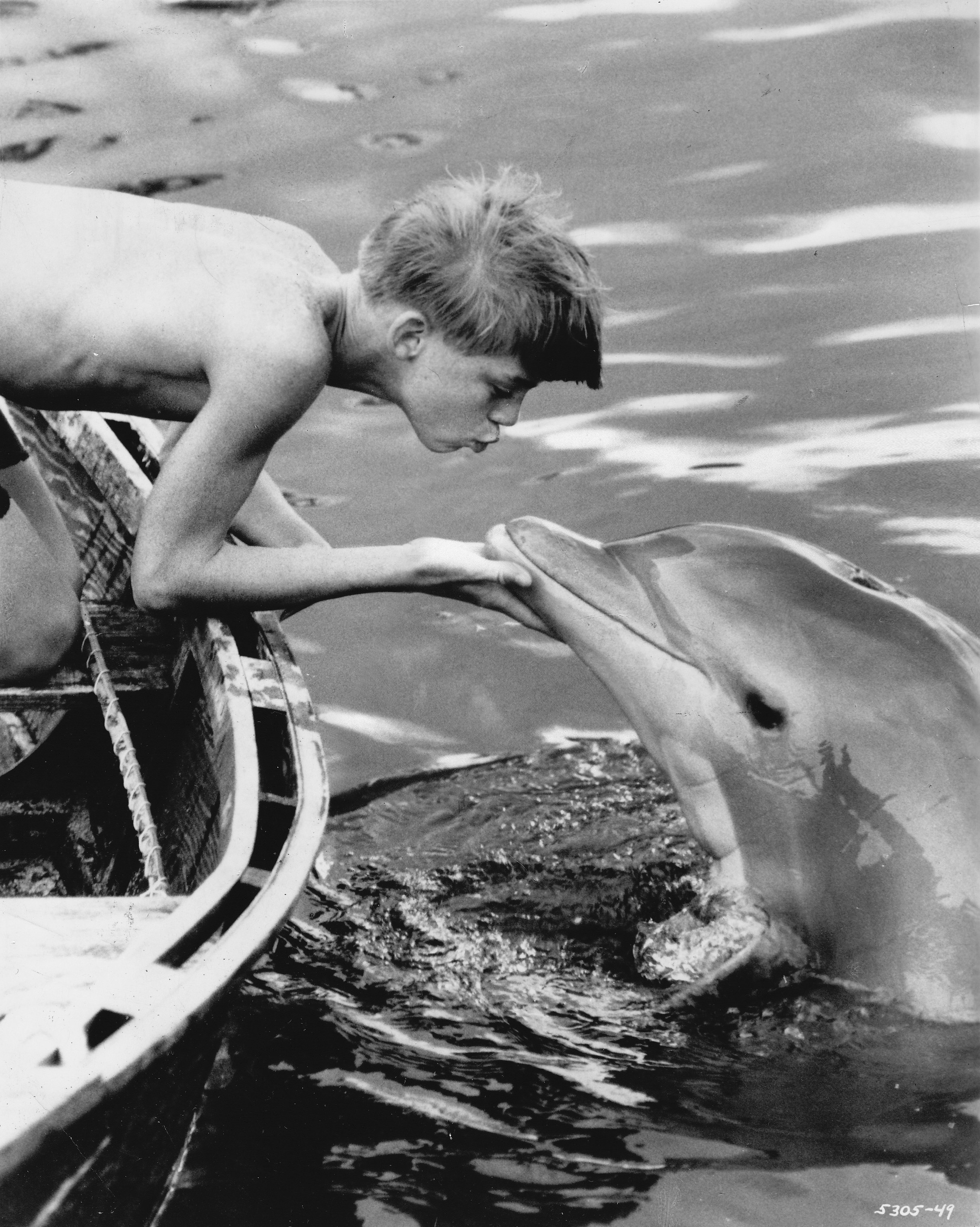
Halpin in the 1963 feature film Flipper

Halpin's most famous role came when at age 15 he was picked to play the 12-year-old Sandy Ricks in producer Ivan Tors' 1963 feature film Flipper (filmed in the Florida Keys and Miami), starring alongside Chuck Connors, who played Sandy's father and fisherman Porter Ricks. The successful film spawned a sequel, Flipper's New Adventure (filmed mainly in the Bahamas), released in 1964, and with new co-star Brian Kelly as Porter Ricks, a trainee Park Ranger who, after his training, is assigned to the fictitious Coral Key Park. Kelly played a widowed father to Sandy (although in reality Halpin was only sixteen years younger than Kelly). Kelly and Halpin kept the same roles for the television series that began filming in the summer of 1964, adding younger brother Bud, played by Tommy Norden.

Halpin was chosen by Tors for the role of Sandy Ricks because of his skills in the water as well as his extensive prior acting experience. He also proved able to bond quickly with the dolphins who filled the role of Flipper. This chemistry paved the way for the launching of the TV series after the two feature films. By the time filming of the TV series commenced, Halpin had become an expert skin and scuba diver and exhibited an easy athleticism that enabled him to perform many of his own stunts in and below the water including a number of dangerous scenes involving sharks. His popular TV character became defined by many water-activity related plots with him often wearing nothing more than what came to be his signature cut-off blue jeans shorts.

The television series ran for eighty-eight episodes from 1964 to 1967 (with Halpin appearing in all but three episodes) and is still in syndication. It was filmed in the park and waters around Key Biscayne, Florida, at the Ivan Tors (now Greenwich) Studios and the Miami Seaquarium, both in Miami. The series performed strongly in the hotly contested Saturday night TV slot, rating in the Top 25 of all TV shows in its debut 1964-65 season. The series made Halpin a teen idol. He was often featured in such magazines as Bravo, Teen Life, 16 Magazine, and the earliest issues of Tiger Beat. On the basis of his appearances in the original Flipper feature films, Halpin was a guest 'contestant' on the CBS panel show To Tell the Truth just prior to the beginning of filming of the Flipper TV series, on March 30, 1964. He appeared on the show again just prior to the filming of the second season, on April 15, 1965.

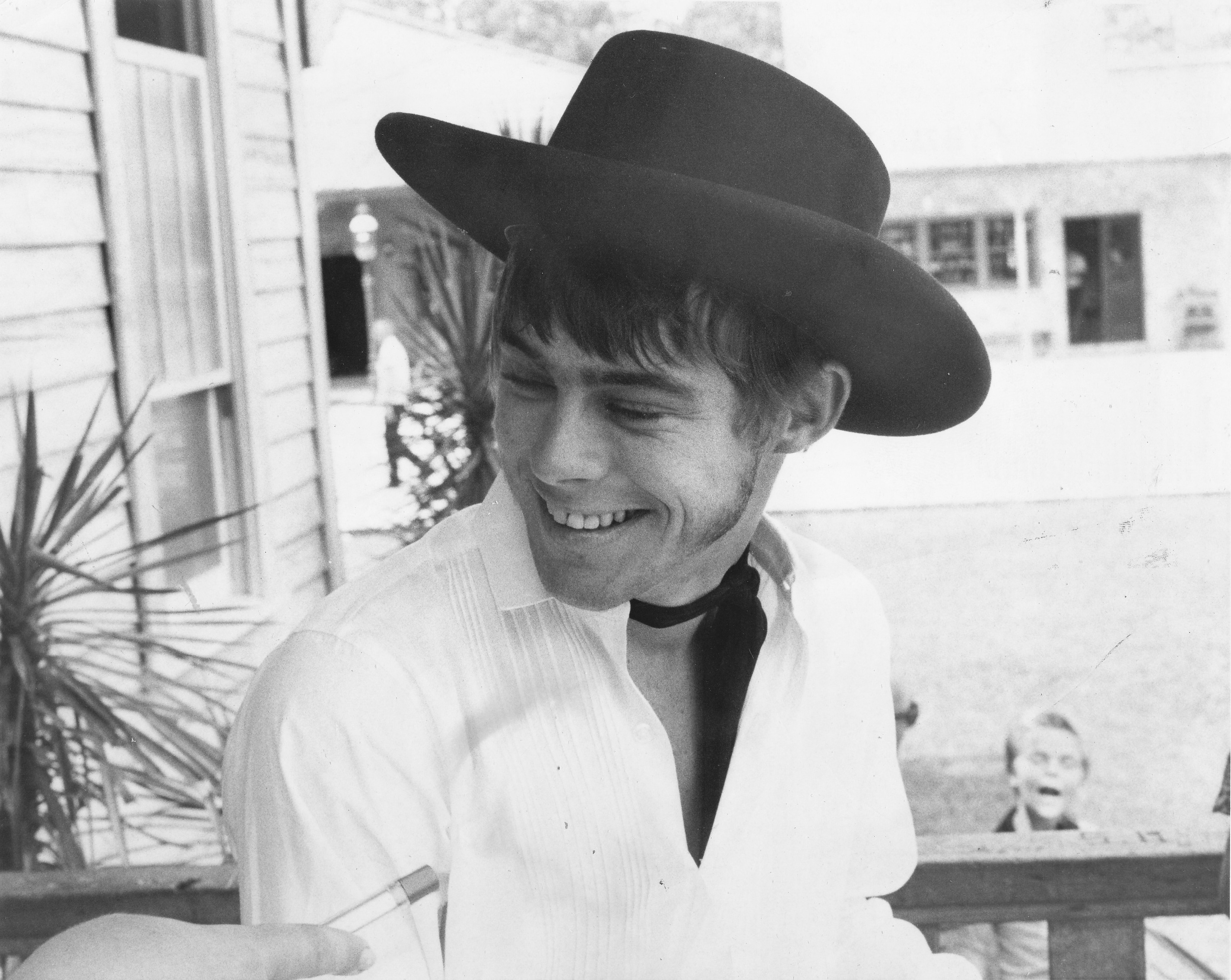
Publicity still promoting Luke Halpin's celebrity guest-star performer appearance at the Six Gun Territory theme park in Silver Springs, Florida, 1967.

=== Later work ===
After Flipper ended, Halpin appeared in feature films, including as Stu MacRae (teen son of Richard Greene's starring character) in Ivan Tors' Island of the Lost (1967), as Bo (a student radical who befriends a teenage girl travelling on a European bus tour) in the comedy If It's Tuesday, This Must Be Belgium (1969), as Keith (First Mate on a shabby vessel chartered for a tour that stumbles on 'living dead' Nazis) in iconic niche horror movie Shock Waves (1977) and as Ken Wilson in Flipper co-creator Ricou Browning's Mr. No Legs (1979). Halpin's guest appearances on television in the years shortly after Flipper were; as Kenny Carter, Jr., in the Carl Betz series Judd, for the Defense (1968), as a celebrity contestant on The Dating Game (1968), as Ben Cabot, Jr., in Bracken's World (1969), as Greg in Ivan Tors' Primus (1972), and as Eric Bates in Caribe (1975).

He appeared in the 1968 episode, "A Mule … Like the Army's Mule" of the syndicated anthology series Death Valley Days, in which he was cast as the outlaw Sandy King, the youngest member of the "Curly Bill" Brocius gang. In the story line, King is befriended by a United States Army lieutenant, played by Sam Melville. Robert Yuro was cast as "Curly Bill".

A notable later appearance was in the 1980 television movie The Ordeal of Dr. Mudd, a dramatization about Samuel Mudd (played by Dennis Weaver), the Maryland physician who was imprisoned as an accomplice to John Wilkes Booth in the assassination of Abraham Lincoln, where Halpin played David Herold, the conspirator who brought Booth, suffering from a broken leg incurred in the process of assassinating Lincoln, to Dr. Mudd for treatment.

== After acting ==
Following an acting career that spanned three decades, Halpin began working as a stuntman, marine coordinator, diver, and speedboat pilot for such feature films as Never Say Never Again, Porky's Revenge!, Flight of the Navigator and Speed 2: Cruise Control as well as for the television series Miami Vice. He also continued to make cameo appearances, most notably on the television series Key West, Miami Vice and in the 1996 feature film remake, Flipper, starring a 15-year-old Elijah Wood as Sandy Ricks.

Halpin lives on the west coast of Florida with his wife, Deborah. He has three sons, Kyle Austin Halpin (born October 1980), Blair Luke Halpin (born December 1982), and Courtney Luke Halpin (born April 1990).

In 2015, it was reported that Halpin was suffering from Stage IV head and neck cancer. A website to assist in his care has been established. In June 2016, a family friend announced the cancer was in remission but that Halpin was at the time in the early stages of Alzheimer's disease.
