= Underwater Warrior =

1958 film by Andrew Marton

- Directed by: Andrew Marton
- Written by: Gene Levitt
- Based on: The Naked Warriors (1957 book) by Francis Douglas Fane
- Produced by: Ivan Tors
- Starring: Dan Dailey; James Gregory; Claire Kelly
- Cinematography: Joseph Biroc
- Edited by: Charles Craft
- Music by: Harry Sukman
- Distributed by: Metro-Goldwyn-Mayer
- Release date: February 14, 1958
- Running time: 91 minutes
- Country: United States
- Language: English
- Budget: $384,000
- Box office: $795,000

Underwater Warrior is a 1958 American CinemaScope war drama film telling the story of the US Navy's Underwater Demolition Teams between World War II and the Korean War. It was based on the 1957 nonfiction book The Naked Warriors by Commander Francis Douglas Fane. Dan Dailey played Fane with two naval officer divers also appearing in the film, Lt Alex Fane, Francis's son and Lt Jon Lindbergh, son of Charles Lindbergh. Producer Ivan Tors subsequently produced the syndicated television series Sea Hunt, also on underwater diving themes.

== Cast ==
- Dan Dailey as Cmdr. David Forest
- James Gregory as Lt. William Arnold, MD
- Ross Martin as Sgt. Joe O'Brien
- Raymond Bailey as Adm. Ashton
- Alex Gerry as Captain of Battleship
- Claire Kelly as Anne Winnmore

== Reception ==
According to MGM records the film earned $405,000 in the US and Canada and $390,000 elsewhere, making a profit of $34,000.

== See also ==
- List of American films of 1958
