= Jessica Wesson =

American actress

- Born: Los Angeles, California, U.S.
- Occupation: Actress
- Years active: 1992–2010

Jessica Wesson is an American former child actress. She is best known for her recurring role as Jennifer Sudarsky, Brad's (Zachery Ty Bryan) first girlfriend on the sitcom Home Improvement, and having supporting roles in the Universal films Casper and Flipper in the 1990s.

In 1993 and 1997, Wesson was nominated for a Young Artist Award for Home Improvement and Flipper. She also co-starred in the film Milk Money (1994).

Wesson guest starred in the television series Baywatch, Boy Meets World and Odd Man Out. In 2001, she had a recurring role as Katie Albright on Judging Amy. Her last acting credit was a role in the 2001 film Longshot.

== Filmography ==
Film
Year	Title	Role	Notes
1994	Milk Money	Stacey	
1995	Casper	Amber Whitmire	
1996	Flipper	Kim Parker	
2001	Longshot	Kelly Montgomery	
2010	The Weird Ones	—N/a	Short film Script supervisor
2010	The Other Way Around	—N/a	Short film Script supervisor

Television
Year	Title	Role	Notes
1992–1993	Home Improvement	Jennifer Sudarsky	7 episodes (seasons 1–2)
1994	Baywatch	Bridgette	Episode: "Western Exposure"
1994–1995	Boy Meets World	Wendy Jansen/Old Wendy	2 episodes (season 2)
1999	Odd Man Out	Riley	Episode: "Batman Forever"
2001	Judging Amy	Katie Albright	5 episodes (season 2)
