= Hello Down There =

1969 comedy adventure film by Jack Arnold, Ricou Browning

- DVD cover
- Directed by: Jack Arnold; Ricou Browning
- Written by: John McGreevey; Frank Telford
- Story by: Ivan Tors; Art Arthur
- Produced by: George Sherman; Ivan Tors
- Starring: Tony Randall; Janet Leigh; Jim Backus; Ken Berry; Roddy McDowall; Charlotte Rae; Richard Dreyfuss
- Cinematography: Clifford H. Poland Jr.
- Edited by: Erwin Dumbrille
- Music by: Jeff Barry
- Production company: Ivan Tors Productions
- Distributed by: Paramount Pictures
- Release date: June 25, 1969
- Running time: 98 minutes
- Country: United States
- Language: English

Hello Down There (rereleased in 1974 as Sub-A-Dub-Dub) is a 1969 American comedy-adventure film starring Tony Randall and Janet Leigh that was released by Paramount Pictures. It was produced by George Sherman and Ivan Tors and directed by Jack Arnold and Ricou Browning (underwater sequences). The screenplay was written by John McGreevey and Frank Telford.

== Plot ==
Fred Miller must prove that his new design for an underwater home is viable by convincing his family to live in it for 30 days. His son and daughter are members of an emerging rock band, and they invite the two other band members to live with them during the experiment. Their temporary home, which Miller dubs the "Green Onion," is 90 feet below the surface of the ocean and is filled with modern appliances and amenities for housewife Vivian, all designed by Miller. A large opening in the floor provides direct access to and from the sea.

The group are soon joined by a live-in seal named Gladys and a pair of dolphins that stay close at hand and fend off sharks. The family is confronted by many obstacles, including a rival designer from Undersea Development, Inc. who begins to cause problems.

Meanwhile, the band's single has gotten the attention of record executive Nate Ashbury, who wants to sign them. He books them for a televised performance on The Merv Griffin Show without first communicating with them. After learning that they are living under the sea, he schemes to bring Griffin and the TV crew down to the Green Onion, but the navy is alerted to the sound of the music and becomes suspicious.

== Cast ==
- Tony Randall as Fred Miller
- Janet Leigh as Vivian Miller
- Jim Backus as T.R. Hollister
- Ken Berry as Mel Cheever
- Roddy McDowall as Nate Ashbury
- Richard Dreyfuss as Harold Webster
- Charlotte Rae as Myrtle Ruth
- Kay Cole as Lorrie Miller
- Gary Tigerman as Tommie Miller
- Lou Wagner as Marvin Webster
- Bruce Gordon as Adm. Sheridan
- Lee Meredith as Dr. Wells
- Frank Schuller as Alan Briggs
- Arnold Stang as Jonah
- Harvey Lembeck as Sonarman
- Merv Griffin as Himself
- Henny Backus as Mrs. Webster
- Pat Henning as Reilly
- Jay Laskay as Philo
- Bud Hoey as Mr. Webster
- Charles Martin as Chief Petty Officer
- Frank Logan as Captain
- Andy Jarrell as Radioman
- Lora Kaye as Lori Miller (Secretary)

== Production ==
Hello Down There was filmed from October to December 1967, with interior scenes shot at Ivan Tors Studios (now known as Greenwich Studios) in Miami, Florida. The underwater sequences were photographed at Ivan Tors Underwater Studios in The Bahamas. Tors had been successful producing a number of scuba-diving and animal themed television series, including Sea Hunt and Flipper.

In 1974, the film was re-released as part of the "Paramount Family Matinee" series.

== Reception ==
In a contemporary review for The New York Times, critic A.H. Weiler called the film an "amiable mishmash" and wrote: "Mr. Randall, looking woebegone and harried, berates his nervous spouse: 'You can't ignore 71 per cent of the earth's surface simply because it's under water.' In the case of 'Hello Down There', it should definitely be ignored."

A Daily News review was also lukewarm, calling Hello Down There a "typical, routine family comedy for general audiences" while praising the underwater photography as well as the seal and dolphins "... who seem to act more sensibly than the adults."

== Critical appraisal ==
Biographer Dana M. Reemes, in his Directed by Jack Arnold (1988) writes:

The picture attempted something rather difficult in those days [of the late 1960s], a G-rated family picture designed to cut across all age groups and bridge the “generation gap” The premise was, to say, at least unusual…There are a few underwater thrills with sharks and dolphins…The whole thing adds up to highly improbable light entertainment.

== Music soundtrack ==
The film features the following songs:

Song name	Lyrics By	Music By	Performed by
"Hello, Down There"	Jeff Barry	Jeff Barry	Jeff Barry
"I Can Love You"	Jeff Barry	Jeff Barry	Harold and the Hang-Ups
"Hey, Little Goldfish"	Jeff Barry	Jeff Barry	Harold and the Hang-Ups
"Glub"	Jeff Barry	Jeff Barry	Harold and the Hang-Ups
"Just One More Chance"	Sam Coslow	Arthur Johnston	Harold and the Hang-Ups w/Tony Randall

== Home media ==
Hello Down There was released on February 22, 2005, as a Region 1 DVD by Paramount Pictures. The film was made available again on June 25, 2013, as a manufactured-on-demand DVD-R through the online Warner Bros. Archive Collection.

== See also ==
- List of American films of 1969
- List of underwater science fiction works

== Sources ==
- Reemes, Dana M. 1988. Directed by Jack Arnold. McFarland & Company, Jefferson, North Carolina 1988. ISBN 978-0899503318
