= Ron Slinker =

American professional wrestler

Personal information
- Born: David Ronald Slinker; October 30, 1945 Kent, Washington, U.S.
- Died: March 28, 2008 (aged 62) Tampa, Florida, U.S.
- Family: Dennis Knight (stepson)

Professional wrestling career
- Ring name(s): Ron Slinker; The Spoiler; Captain
- Billed height: 6 ft 1 in (1.85 m)
- Billed weight: 250 lb (110 kg)
- Debut: 1970s
- Retired: 1991

David Ronald Slinker (October 30, 1945 – March 28, 2008) was an American professional wrestler and martial artist who competed in several North American promotions.

== Early life ==
Slinker began studying martial arts at a young age and attained the rank of second dan black belt in judo and sixth dan in Yōshūkai. He joined the United States Marine Corps at age 17 before attending the University of Tampa. He worked as a police officer for the Tampa Police Department for ten years. Slinker also taught Yoshukai Karate under Mike Foster, coaching his fighters in the Battle of Atlanta (1976) among others. He competed in 29 karate tournaments, of which he won 27. In 1971, he was named to the United States judo team. That year, he also won the Amateur Athletic Union Southeast heavyweight championship in judo.

== Career ==
Slinker wrestled for International World Class Championship Wrestling, Mid-South Wrestling (later Universal Wrestling Federation), World Wrestling Council, Florida Championship Wrestling and the National Wrestling Alliance. At various times, he was managed by Woman or competed as part of Kevin Sullivan's Army of Darkness. While competing in Tennessee, he challenged Jerry Lawler for the Memphis version of the NWA Southern Heavyweight Championship on April 10, 1978, but was unsuccessful. On May 4, 1979, he won his first championship belt by defeating David Schultz for the NWA Southeastern Heavyweight Championship, a title Schultz soon regained in a rematch.

Slinker also competed as a tag team wrestler, teaming with Kendall Windham, Edward Leslie and Ron Bass. On December 25, 1978, at the NWA Mid-South Superdome Extravaganza, Slinker and Bass competed in a tournament to determine the new holders of the NWA United States Tag Team Championship. They faced André the Giant and Dusty Rhodes but were defeated. Competing in a tag team with Sgt. Rock in 1990, Slinker also won the NWA Florida Tag Team Championship. They won the title on November 12, 1990, and held the belts until the title was abandoned.

After retiring as a professional wrestler in the early 1990s, Slinker managed Ron Bass and Robert Fuller before becoming a promoter and booking agent in Florida. Meeting Rob Szatkowski, Slinker suggested he change his ring name to Rob Van Dam, a name he has used ever since. He also introduced Szatkowski to Japanese promoter Giant Baba and helped him find work in World Championship Wrestling. While working for the United States Wrestling Association, Slinker also helped train such wrestlers as Flex Kavana, who later gained fame as The Rock.

== Personal life ==
Slinker had two children, David, Jr. and Dina. He also had a twin brother named Don, another brother named Bill, and a sister named Mary Jo. He also had a stepson, Dennis Knight, who has competed under the ring names Tex Slazenger, Phineas Godwinn, and Mideon. In 1979, Slinker appeared in Mr. No Legs, a kung fu movie.

Throughout much of his life, Slinker struggled with addiction. He was arrested on multiple occasions, which led to charges of theft and conspiracy to deliver drugs. He died on March 28, 2008, of liver failure, brought on by a lifetime of alcoholism.

== Championships and accomplishments ==
- Championship Wrestling from Florida

- NWA Florida Tag Team Championship (1 time) - with Sgt. Rock

- Southeastern Championship Wrestling

- NWA Southeastern Heavyweight Championship (Southern Division) (1 time)
