= Around the World Under the Sea =

1966 film by Andrew Marton

- Around the World Under the Sea film poster by Frank McCarthy
- Directed by: Andrew Marton (main unit); Ricou Browning (underwater sequences)
- Written by: Elmer Parsons
- Screenplay by: Art Arthur; Arthur Weiss
- Produced by: Ben Chapman; Andrew Marton; Ivan Tors
- Starring: Lloyd Bridges; Brian Kelly
- Cinematography: Clifford H. Poland Jr.
- Edited by: Warren Adams
- Music by: Harry Sukman
- Distributed by: MGM
- Release date: June 22, 1966
- Running time: 110 minutes
- Country: United States
- Language: English

Around the World Under the Sea is a 1966 American science-fiction film directed by Andrew Marton and starring Lloyd Bridges, Marshall Thompson, Shirley Eaton, Gary Merrill and David McCallum. It follows the adventures of a crew of the deep-diving nuclear-powered civilian research submarine Hydronaut making a submerged circumnavigation of the world to plant monitoring sensors on the ocean floor that will help scientists predict impending earthquakes.

== Plot ==
After the destruction of much of coastal Turkey, an American-led crew of experts from around the world pilots a five-person submarine traveling the world oceans, planting sensors on the ocean floor to warn scientists of impending earthquakes. The mission was made necessary as tidal waves have been causing destruction all over the world.

Along the way, the crew must deal with underwater exploding volcanoes and giant eels. The crew members are often at odds, especially when one wants to use the submarine to reach a shipwreck that holds a safe containing diamonds and pearls.

== Cast ==
- Lloyd Bridges as Dr. Doug Standish
- Brian Kelly as Dr. Craig Mosby
- Shirley Eaton as Dr. Margaret E. "Maggie" Hanford
- David McCallum as Dr. Philip Volker
- Keenan Wynn as Hank Stahl
- Marshall Thompson as Dr. Orin Hillyard
- Gary Merrill as Dr. August 'Gus' Boren
- Ron Hayes as Brinkman
- George Shibata as Prof. Uji Hamaru
- Donald Linton as Vice President of the USA
- Frank Logan as Captain of the Diligence
- Don Wells as Sonar Man on the Diligence
- Jack Ewalt as Jack Smith, Mining Platform Superintendent
- George De Vries as Coast Guard Lieutenant
- Tony Gulliver as Officer
- Joey Carter as Technician
- Celeste Yarnall as Secretary
- Paul Gray as Pilot

== Production ==
It was the second of two movies Shirley Eaton made for Ivan Tors.

== Reception ==
In a contemporary review for The New York Times, critic Bosley Crowther wrote a scathingly sarcastic review of Around the World Under the Sea:

A deplorable lack of imagination is apparent ... Here is an underwater saga in which the crew of the crucial submarine includes four prominent television actors who are all stars in popular series and one beautiful blonde ... And what do they do? Do they quarrel over how to control that submarine or perform their skim-diving maneuvers, based on their experiences in their television shows? ... Not at all. They don't even mention their respective TV shows or occasionally make pointed reference to their ratings in order to assert themselves. ... What a chance was missed by Andrew Marton and the fellows who wrote the script! What were they trying to make these actors act like—people? Didn't they realize these are personalities?

== Adaptation ==
- Dell Movie Classic: Around the World Under the Sea (December 1966)

== See also ==
- List of underwater science fiction works
- List of American films of 1966
