= Ricou Browning =

American stuntman and filmmaker (1930–2023)

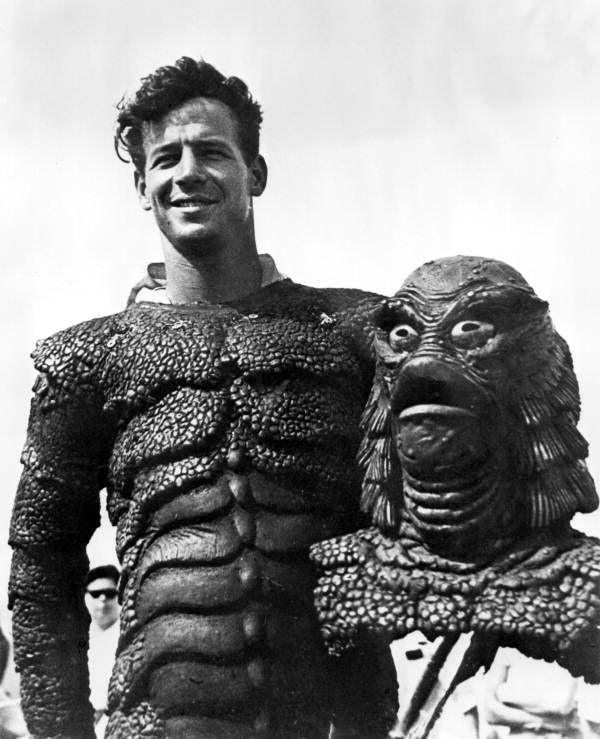
- Browning in the Gill-man costume, c. 1954
- Born: Ricou Ren Browning; February 16, 1930; Fort Pierce, Florida, U.S.
- Died: February 27, 2023 (aged 93); Southwest Ranches, Florida, U.S.
- Occupations: Film director; actor; producer; screenwriter; cinematographer; stuntman
- Years active: 1945–1986
- Children: 4

Ricou Ren Browning (February 16, 1930 – February 27, 2023) was an American stunt performer, filmmaker and actor. A skilled swimmer, he was known for his innovative underwater stunt work, notably in the 1954 film Creature from the Black Lagoon, in which he portrayed the titular Gill-man during the film's underwater scenes, and in the 1965 James Bond film Thunderball, for which he was the underwater sequences director. He was also the co-creator of the Flipper media franchise.

== Early life ==
Ricou Ren Browning was born in Fort Pierce, Florida, on February 16, 1930. He majored in physical education at Florida State University.

== Career ==
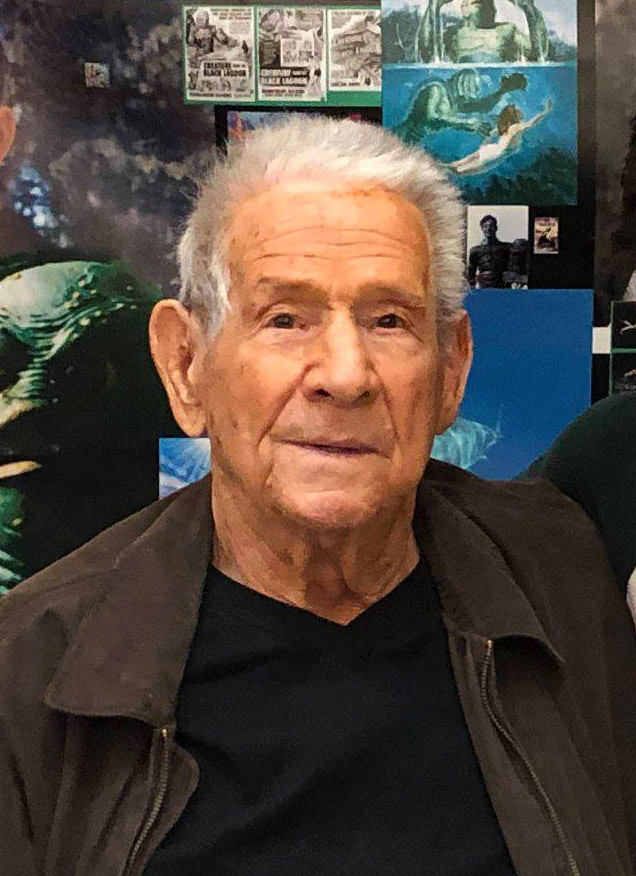
Browning in March 2019

Browning started a career in water shows, moving on to produce shows. Browning worked at Wakulla Springs in the 1940s and learned to perform in underwater newsreels conceived by Newt Perry, who later took Browning along when he opened Weeki Wachee Springs.

While working at Wakulla Springs in 1953, Browning was asked to show around a film crew scouting for shooting locations. According to Browning, "Their cameraman asked if I could swim in front of the cameras so they could get the perspective of the size of a human being against the fish and the grass. So I did." Days later, the crew offered Browning the role of the titular Gill-man in the film Creature from the Black Lagoon (1954). Browning accepted, and played the Gill-man in the film's underwater scenes, while actor Ben Chapman played the monster on land. During filming, Browning reportedly held his breath underwater for up to four minutes at a time. Browning reprised his role as the underwater Gill-man in two sequels, Revenge of the Creature (1955) and The Creature Walks Among Us (1956).

Browning continued in movie production and joined Ivan Tors' studios in Florida, where he co-wrote and co-produced the 1963 film Flipper (about an intelligent bottlenose dolphin) together with Jack Cowden; Browning also directed the second unit underwater scenes for the film. Browning continued writing and directing for the subsequent Flipper television series that debuted in 1964.

He made his feature film directorial debut with Salty (1973), which he also co-wrote with Cowden, and directed the cult film Mr. No Legs (1978).

He worked as second unit director, stunt coordinator and underwater sequence director on a number of features, including the James Bond films Thunderball (1965) and Never Say Never Again (1983), Around the World Under the Sea (1966), Island of the Lost (1967), Hello Down There (1969), and Caddyshack (1980).

A Florida native, Browning was inducted into the Florida Artists Hall of Fame in 2012. In 2019, he was inducted into the Rondo Hatton Classic Horror Awards' Monster Kid Hall of Fame.

Prior to his death, Browning was considered the last surviving original actor to portray any of the Universal Classic Monsters.

== Personal life and death ==
Browning had two sons and two daughters. His wife, Fran, died in March 2020.

Browning died at home in Southwest Ranches, Florida, on February 27, 2023, at age 93.

== Selected filmography ==
=== Film ===
==== As actor/stuntman ====
Year	Title	Role	Notes	Ref(s)
1954	Creature from the Black Lagoon	Gill-man	Underwater scenes	
1954	20,000 Leagues Under the Sea	—N/a	Stunt diver	
1955	Revenge of the Creature	Gill-man	Underwater scenes	
1956	The Creature Walks Among Us	Gill-man	Underwater scenes	
1964	Flipper's New Adventure	Dr. Burton		

==== As director/writer/stunt coordinator ====
Year	Title	Director	Writer	Stunt coordinator	Notes	Ref(s)
1963	Flipper	Second unit	Co-writer	Yes	Underwater scenes; co-wrote story with Jack Cowden; also associate producer	
1965	Thunderball	Second unit		Yes	Underwater scenes	
1966	Around the World Under the Sea	Second unit			Diving sequences	
1967	Island of the Lost	Second unit			Underwater scenes	
1969	Hello Down There	Second unit			Underwater scenes	
1973	Salty	Yes	Co-writer		Co-wrote with Jack Cowden	
1978	Mr. No Legs	Yes				
1979	Hot Stuff	Second unit				
1980	Caddyshack	Second unit				
1980	Raise the Titanic	Second unit				
1980	Island Claws		Co-writer		Co-wrote with Jack Cowden	
1981	Nobody's Perfekt	Second unit				
1983	Never Say Never Again	Second unit			Underwater scenes	
1985	The Heavenly Kid			Yes		
1986	Opposing Force			Miami unit		
1988	Police Academy 5: Assignment Miami Beach	Second unit				

=== Television ===
==== As actor/stuntman ====
Year	Title	Role	Notes	Ref(s)
1958–1961	Sea Hunt	—N/a	Second unit stunt double; 30 episodes	
1960–1961	The Aquanauts (Note: Later known as Malibu Run.)	—N/a	Stunt double	
1964–1967	Flipper	Water Skier/The Monster	2 episodes: "Lifeguard" and "Flipper's Monster"	

==== As director ====
Year	Title	Notes	Ref(s)
1958–1961	Sea Hunt	Underwater scenes; multiple episodes	
1964–1967	Flipper	37 episodes	
