= Arthur Weiss =

American screenwriter

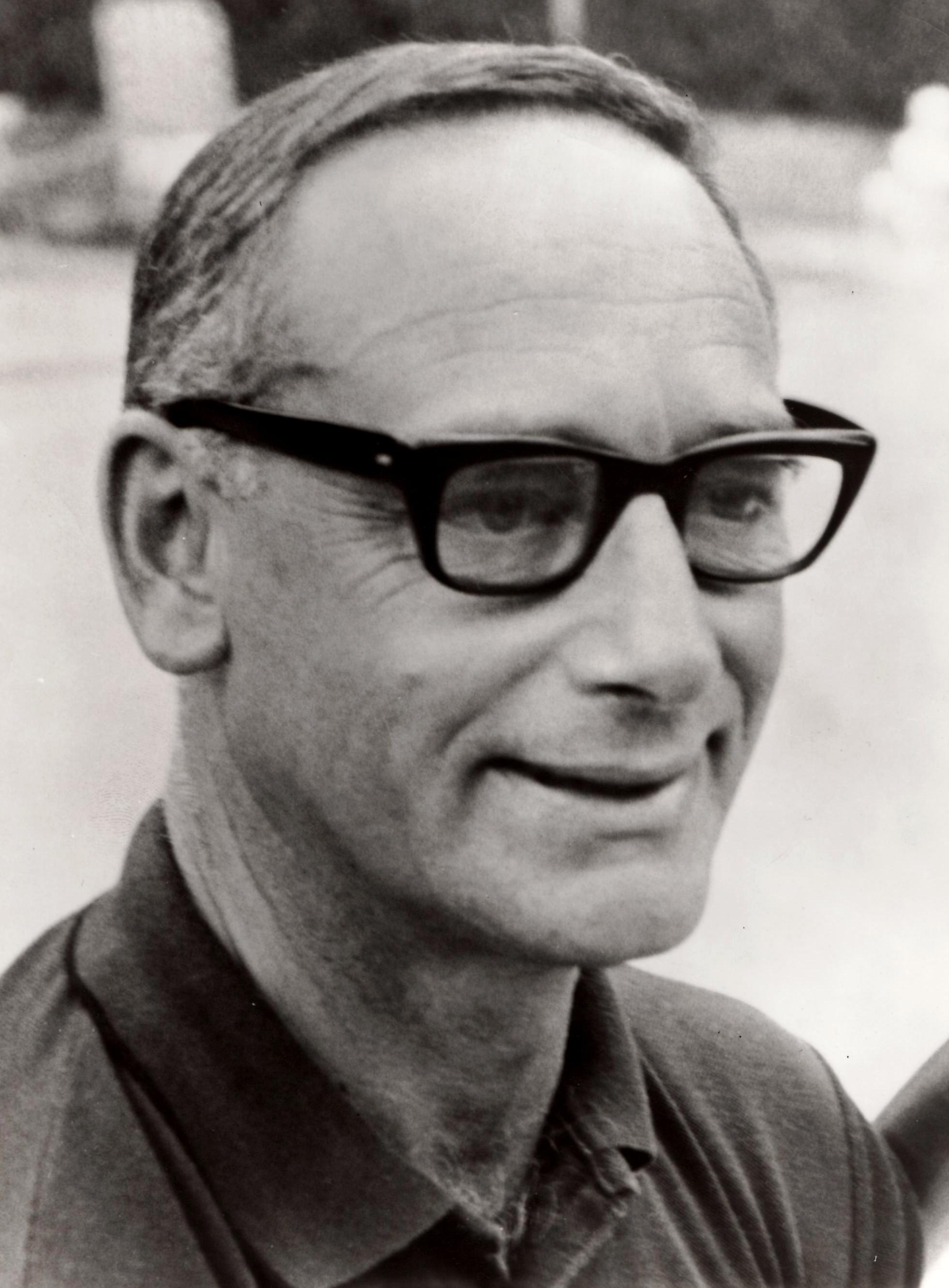
- Born: Arthur Weiss; 13 June 1912; New York City, New York
- Died: 26 August 1980 (aged 68); Los Angeles, California
- Years active: 1955–1977
- Spouse(s): Fay Baker (1940–1965; divorced); 2 children (1 deceased)

Arthur Weiss (13 June 1912 – 26 August 1980) was an American script writer for two decades on action/adventure TV shows like Mission: Impossible, Mannix, The Fugitive, Super Friends, The Time Tunnel, Emergency!, and Sea Hunt. His most famous creation was the script for the movie Flipper in 1963, which became a TV series and was remade as a movie in 1996. He also worked alongside Irwin Allen as a writer and producer for "disaster" TV films including Flood! and Fire!.

In 1969 Weiss published the novel O'Kelly's Eclipse about the undefeated British racehorse Eclipse.

Weiss married actress Fay Baker on 3 August 1940. He divorced in 1965 and later married Patricia Jones.

== Television series scripts ==
TV series Scripts
TV Show	Episode	Date
Emergency!	Body Language	8 December 1973
Emergency!	Quicker Than the Eye	9 November 1974
Super Friends	The Power Pirate	8 September 1973
Super Friends	The Baffles Puzzle	15 September 1973
Super Friends	Professor Goodfellow's G.E.E.C.	22 September 1973
Super Friends	The Weather Maker	29 September 1973
Super Friends	Dr. Pelagian's War	6 October 1973
Super Friends	Shamon U	13 October 1973
Super Friends	Too Hot to Handle	20 October 1973
Super Friends	The Androids	27 October 1973
Super Friends	The Balloon People	3 November 1973
Super Friends	The Fantastic Frerps	10 November 1973
Super Friends	The Ultra Beam	17 November 1973
Super Friends	Menace of the White Dwarf	24 November 1973
Super Friends	The Mysterious Moles	1 December 1973
Super Friends	Gulliver's Gigantic Goof	8 December 1973
Super Friends	The Planet Splitter	15 December 1973
Super Friends	The Watermen	22 December 1973
Mission: Impossible	The Killer	19 September 1970
Mission: Impossible	Takeover	2 January 1971
Mission: Impossible	The Missile	16 January 1971
Mission: Impossible	Blind	18 September 1971
Mission: Impossible	Underwater	6 November 1971
Mission: Impossible	Committed	22 January 1972
Mission: Impossible	Movie	4 November 1972
Land of the Giants	Target: Earth	2 March 1969
Land of the Giants	The Chase	20 April 1969
Land of the Giants	Deadly Pawn	12 October 1969
Land of the Giants	Chamber of Fear	16 November 1969
Mannix	The Silent Cry	28 September 1968
Mannix	Fly, Little One	21 February 1970
Mannix	The Man Outside	24 November 1971
Mannix	To Kill a Memory	29 October 1972
Mannix	A Question of Murder	10 March 1974
Voyage to the Bottom of the Sea	Fires of Death	17 September 1967
Voyage to the Bottom of the Sea	Journey with Fear	15 October 1967
Voyage to the Bottom of the Sea	Deadly Amphibians	17 December 1967
Voyage to the Bottom of the Sea	Savage Jungle	25 February 1968
The Time Tunnel	One Way to the Moon	16 September 1966
The Time Tunnel	End of the World	23 September 1966
The Time Tunnel	The Day the Sky Fell In	30 September 1966
The Time Tunnel	The Last Patrol	7 October 1966
The Time Tunnel	Crack of Doom	14 October 1966
The Time Tunnel	Revenge of the Gods	21 October 1966
The Time Tunnel	Massacre	28 October 1966
The Time Tunnel	Devil's Island	11 November 1966
The Time Tunnel	Reign of Terror	18 November 1966
The Time Tunnel	Secret Weapon	25 November 1966
The Time Tunnel	The Death Trap	2 December 1966
The Time Tunnel	The Alamo	9 December 1966
The Time Tunnel	Night of the Long Knives	16 December 1966
The Time Tunnel	Invasion	23 December 1966
The Time Tunnel	The Revenge of Robin Hood	30 December 1966
The Time Tunnel	Kill Two by Two	6 January 1967
The Time Tunnel	The Ghost of Nero	20 January 1967
The Time Tunnel	The Walls of Jericho	27 January 1967
The Time Tunnel	Idol of Death	3 February 1967
The Time Tunnel	Billy the Kid	10 February 1967
The Time Tunnel	Pirates of Deadman's Island	17 February 1967
The Time Tunnel	Chase Through Time	24 February 1967
The Time Tunnel	The Death Merchant	3 March 1967
The Time Tunnel	Attack of the Barbarians	10 March 1967
The Time Tunnel	Merlin the Magician	17 March 1967
The Time Tunnel	The Kidnappers	24 March 1967
The Time Tunnel	Raiders from Outer Space	31 March 1967
The Time Tunnel	Town of Terror	7 April 1967
Daktari	Leopard of Madla George	15 February 1966
Flipper	(unknown episodes)	1964
The Fugitive	Decision in the Ring	22 October 1963
The Fugitive	Home Is the Hunted	7 January 1964
The Fugitive	The End Is But the Beginning	12 January 1965
The Fugitive	Fun and Games and Party Favors	26 January 1965
Dr. Kildare	A Time to Every Purpose	27 December 1962
Ripcord	The Sky Diver	28 September 1961
Everglades	Lie Detector	27 November 1961
Men into Space	Moon Probe	30 September 1959
Men into Space	Tankers in Space	6 January 1960
The Man and the Challenge	Odds Against Survival	26 September 1959
The Man and the Challenge	White Out	14 November 1959
The Rifleman	Young Englishman	16 December 1958
The Restless Gun	The Hand Is Quicker	17 March 1958
The Court of Last Resort	The Frank Clark Case (writing supervisor)	21 February 1958
The Court of Last Resort	The Jacob Loveless Case (script supervisor)	28 February 1958
The Court of Last Resort	The Mary Morales Case	21 March 1958
The Court of Last Resort	The Todd-Loomis Case	4 April 1958
Sea Hunt	Sixty Feet Below	4 January 1958
Sea Hunt	Mark of the Octopus	1 February 1958
Sea Hunt	Killer Whale	22 March 1958
Sea Hunt	Magnetic Mine	31 May 1958
Sea Hunt	Hermes	10 May 1959
Dr. Christian	The Guardian	1 January 1956
Highway Patrol	Released Convict	1 January 1956
Highway Patrol	Hit and Run	13 February 1956
Highway Patrol	Dead Patrolman	30 April 1956
Highway Patrol	Stolen Car Ring	24 December 1956
Highway Patrol	Mistaken Identity	1 January 1957
Highway Patrol	Escaped Mental Patient	1 January 1957
Highway Patrol	Nitro	25 March 1957
Highway Patrol	Double Cross	3 June 1957
Science Fiction Theatre	The Unexplored	11 November 1955
Science Fiction Theatre	Before the Beginning	16 December 1955
Science Fiction Theatre	The Long Sleep	13 April 1956
Science Fiction Theatre	The Unguided Missile	25 May 1956
Science Fiction Theatre	Jupitron	17 August 1956
Science Fiction Theatre	The Strange Lodger	8 February 1957
Four Star Playhouse	Tusitala	24 February 1955

== Television series production ==
TV series Production
TV Show	Episode	Date
The Swiss Family Robinson (Producer)	(unknown episodes)	1975–1977
The Fugitive (Associate Producer)	Fear in a Desert City	17 September 1963
The Fugitive (Associate Producer)	The Witch	24 September 1963
The Fugitive (Associate Producer)	The Other Side of the Mountain	1 October 1963
The Fugitive (Associate Producer)	Never Wave Goodbye: Part 1	8 October 1963
The Fugitive (Associate Producer)	Never Wave Goodbye: Part 2	15 October 1963
The Fugitive (Associate Producer)	Smoke Screen	29 October 1963
The Fugitive (Associate Producer)	Fatso	19 November 1963
The Fugitive (Associate Producer)	Home Is the Hunted	7 January 1964
The Fugitive (Associate Producer)	Come Watch Me Die	21 January 1964
The Fugitive (Associate Producer)	Where the Action Is	28 January 1964
The Fugitive (Associate Producer)	Flight from the Final Demon	10 March 1964
The Fugitive (Associate Producer)	Taps for a Dead War	17 March 1964
The Fugitive (Associate Producer)	Somebody to Remember	24 March 1964
The Fugitive (Associate Producer)	Never Stop Running	31 March 1964
The Fugitive (Associate Producer)	The Homecoming	7 April 1964
The Fugitive (Associate Producer)	Storm Center	14 April 1964
The Fugitive (Associate Producer)	The End Game	21 April 1964

== Filmography ==
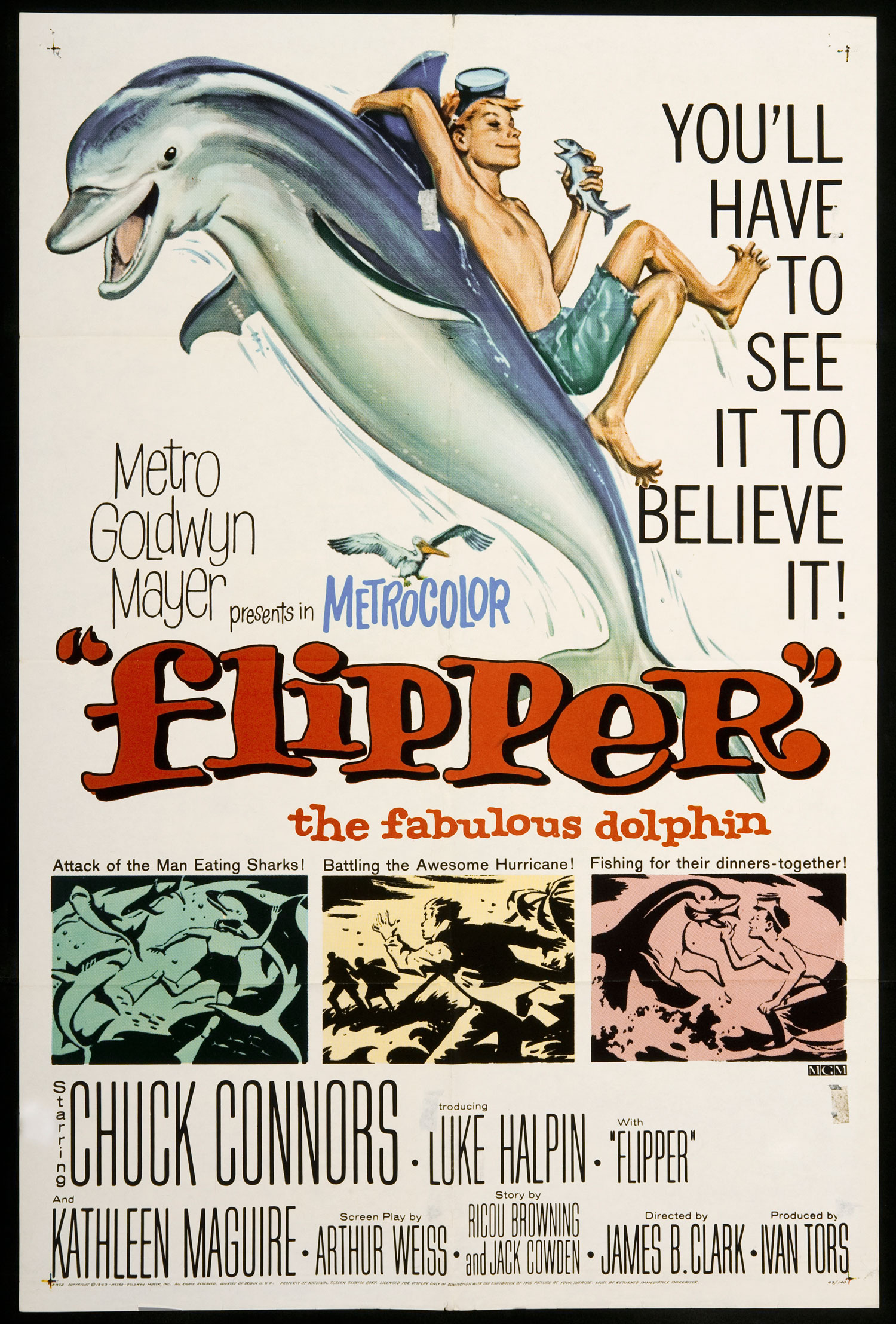
Screen Play by Arthur Weiss

Film
Year	Film	Role	Notes
1996	Flipper	Original Script	Posthumous credit
1983	The Night the Bridge Fell Down	Writer	Posthumous credit
1978	The Return of Captain Nemo	Producer	TV
1977	Fire!	Writer/Executive	TV
1976	Adventures of the Queen	Production Executive	TV
1976	Flood!	Writer/Executive	TV
1976	Time Travelers	Production executive	TV
1966	Namu, the Killer Whale	Writer	
1966	Around the World Under the Sea	Writer	
1964	Rhino!	Writer	
1963	Flipper	Writer	
