= Flipper (1963 film) =

1963 American feature film directed by James B. Clark

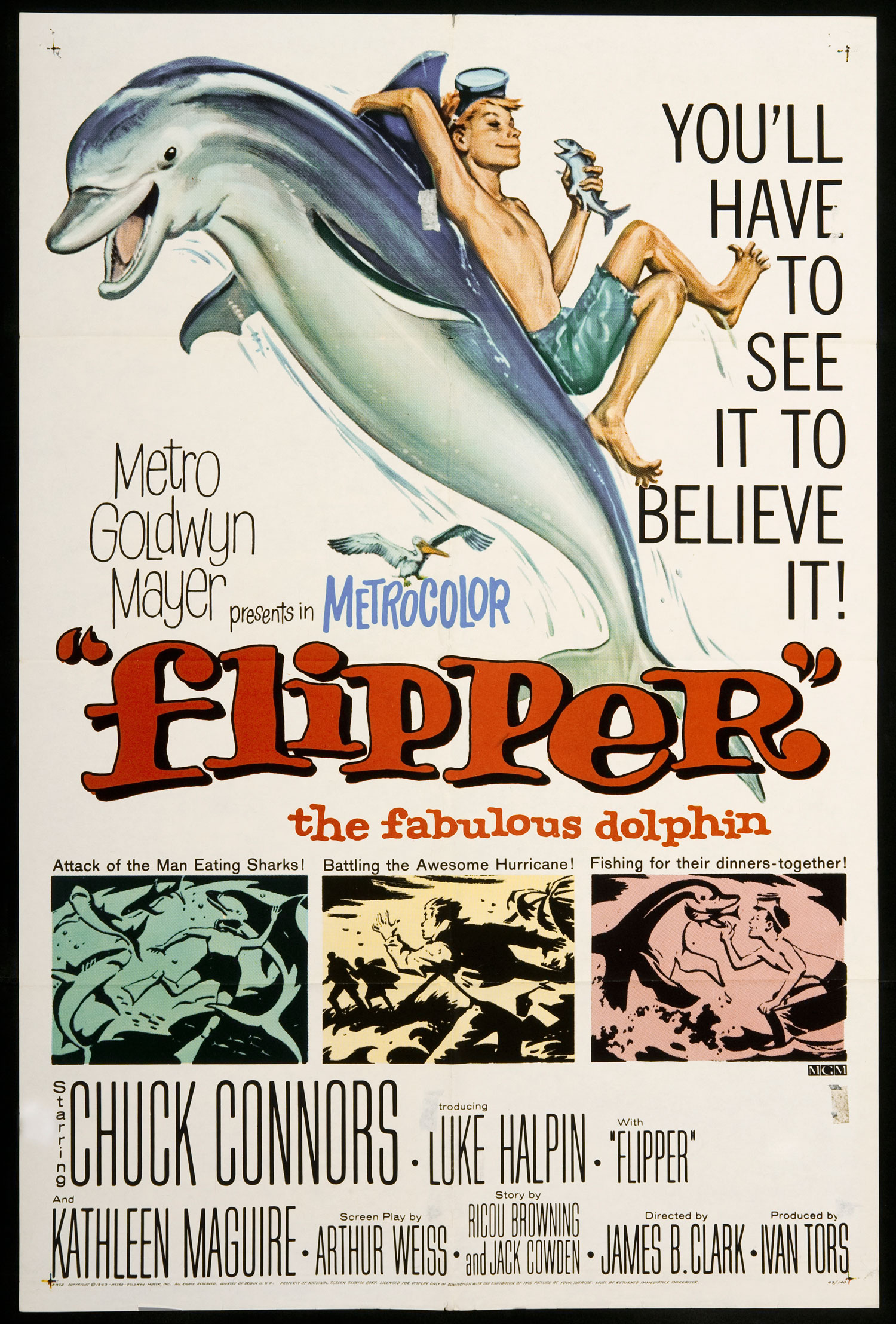
- Theatrical release poster
- Directed by: James B. Clark
- Screenplay by: Arthur Weiss
- Story by: Ricou Browning; Jack Cowden
- Produced by: Ivan Tors
- Starring: Chuck Connors; Luke Halpin; Joe Higgins; Kathleen Maguire
- Cinematography: Lamar Boren; Joseph Brun
- Edited by: Warren Brown
- Music by: Henry Vars
- Distributed by: Metro-Goldwyn-Mayer
- Release date: August 14, 1963
- Running time: 90 minutes
- Country: United States
- Language: English
- Budget: $500,000
- Box office: $2,500,000 (rentals)

Flipper is a 1963 American adventure film written by Arthur Weiss based upon a story by Ricou Browning and Jack Cowden. Produced by Ivan Tors and directed by James B. Clark, the film centers on a 12-year-old boy living with his parents in the Florida Keys who befriends an injured wild dolphin. The boy and the dolphin become inseparable, eventually overcoming the misgivings of the boy's fisherman father.

Released by Metro-Goldwyn-Mayer on August 14, 1963, the film introduced the popular song Flipper by Dunham and Henry Vars. It was a surprise hit at the box office and inspired the subsequent television series of the same name (1964–1967) and film sequels.

The original dolphin was a female named Mitzi, and was owned by an older couple in Little Torch Key. Mitsy performed all the tricks in the original movie. It took five different dolphins to "replace" her in the sequel film.

== Plot ==
Sandy Ricks is a young boy living in the Florida Keys who rescues and befriends a dolphin injured by a harpoon after a hurricane. His father, fisherman Porter Ricks, disapproves since dolphins compete for fish and jeopardize the family income. He is also upset that Sandy neglects his chores after befriending the dolphin, especially those assigned by Porter to repair items damaged by the hurricane.

Sandy names the dolphin Flipper. Flipper recovers from the harpoon wound and puts on a show to entertain the neighborhood children. Porter, seeing Flipper as both a threat to his nets and fish and a distraction to Sandy's chores, lets the recovered Flipper swim out of his pen to the open sea, despite his son's tearful plea to keep the animal.

Flipper returns to the pen, much to Sandy's delight, but devours Porter's entire catch of pompano, which were caught only because Flipper guided Sandy to the fish. The loss is keenly felt because of a red plague killing local fish in large numbers. Porter harshly berates Sandy for allowing Flipper to jump into the holding pen of valuable fish waiting to go to market. Reduced to tears, Sandy retreats to his bedroom as Porter's wife Martha reminds Porter that even though what he did was wrong, Sandy is just a child.

Determined to make up for the loss, Sandy sets off to find more fish, and is led by Flipper to a large school of fish near a reef. Later, while swimming in a search for more fish, Sandy is chased by a pair of sharks, only to be rescued by Flipper who attacks and kills both sharks. Upon learning that Flipper had saved his son's life and there was a huge abundance of fish found in the areas where Sandy had found thanks to Flipper, the grateful father reconciles with his son. Porter is finally convinced that there are enough fish for the local residents as well as the dolphins.

== Cast ==
- Mitzi as Flipper
- Chuck Connors as Porter Ricks
- Luke Halpin as Sandy Ricks
- Kathleen Maguire as Martha Ricks
- Connie Scott as Kim Parker
- Jane Rose as Hettie White
- Joe Higgins as Mr. L. C. Parett
- Robertson White as Mr. Abrams
- George Applewhite as Sheriff Rogers
- Sharon Roberts (Bertram) as pretty girl by water and Sabrina's mom

== Production ==
Co-creator Ricou Browning said that he originally conceived the story after seeing his children intently watching the TV series Lassie, which inspired Browning to create a similar story with a dolphin in place of the dog. After he sent the story to his friend, producer Ivan Tors, Tors expressed interest in making it into a film.

Filmed in color in 1962 and released in 1963, Flipper has several underwater sequences, along with scenes of the trained dolphin performing stunts. Flipper was portrayed by the dolphin Mitzi, a female born in 1958 and trained at the Santini Porpoise School (later the Dolphin Research Center) by Milton and Virginia Santini, who are credited in the film. Mitzi died in 1972 and is buried at the Dolphin Research Center.

In addition to Mitzi, four other dolphins were filmed for the production of the movie. Two of the dolphins, Little Bit, a female, and Mr. Gipper, a male, mated at the Santini Porpoise School, yielding a calf named Tursi in 1973 who still lives at the Dolphin Research Center as of 2026.

== Sequels ==
A film sequel, Flipper's New Adventure, was filmed in late 1963 and released in June 1964. That same year, a television series inspired by the movie, also titled Flipper, began and ran until 1967. A 1990s television revival featured Jessica Alba. In 1996, a movie remake was released, starring Paul Hogan and Elijah Wood.

== See also ==
- List of American films of 1963
