= Ivan Tors =

Hungarian playwright, film director, screenwriter, and film and television producer

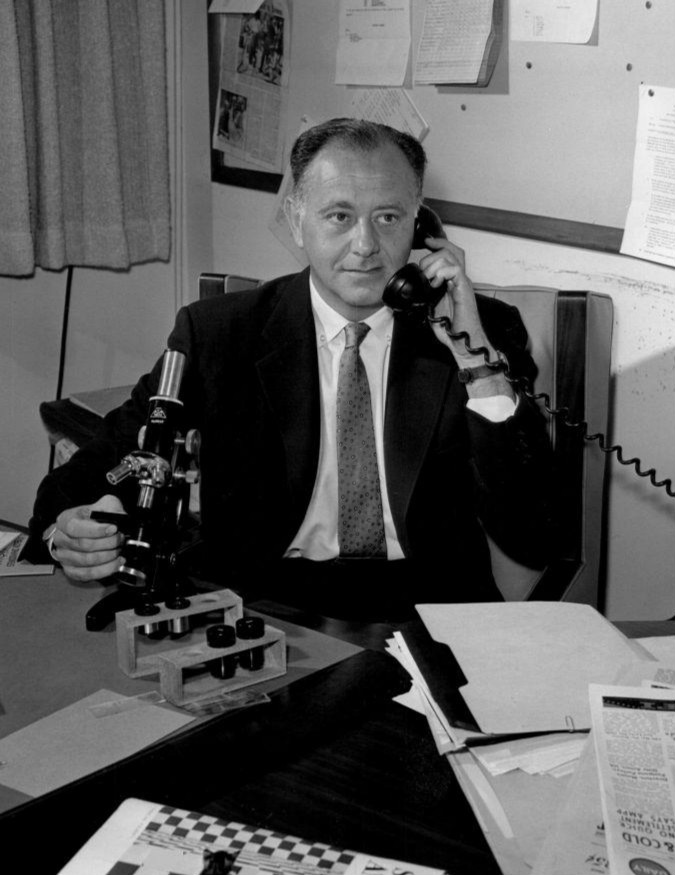
- 1960 photo
- Born: Iván Törzs; June 12, 1916; Budapest, Austria-Hungary
- Died: June 4, 1983 (aged 66); Mato Grosso, Brazil
- Years active: 1946–1980
- Spouse(s): Constance Dowling (1955–1969) (her death) (4 children Steve, Peter, David )

Ivan Tors (born Iván Törzs; June 12, 1916 – June 4, 1983) was a Hungarian playwright, who became an American film director, screenwriter, and film and television producer with an emphasis on non-violent but exciting science fiction, underwater sequences, and stories involving animals. He started a Miami-based film studio, Ivan Tors Studios, now known as Greenwich Studios, and later a music company.

== Biography ==
Tors was born to a Jewish family in Budapest, Hungary. He wrote several plays in his native country before moving to the United States just prior to World War II. He arrived with his brother Ervin in July 1939 on the SS Hansa and had come to study at Fordham University in New York City. He subsequently enlisted in the United States Army Air Corps then transferred to the Office of Strategic Services. Following the war, he was contracted to Metro-Goldwyn-Mayer as a screenwriter.

In 1952, he made Storm over Tibet, his first film as co-writer and producer. He began his partnership with his fellow Hungarian Andrew Marton with this film, reusing much of Marton's footage from Demon of the Himalayas.

Long interested in fact-based science fiction, often with an underwater setting, Tors partnered with actor Richard Carlson in the 1950s to create A-Men Films, a production company devoted to making films about its own fictitious exploits.

Under the A-Men banner, Tors wrote and produced The Magnetic Monster (1953) reusing footage from the 1934 German film Gold. This was the first film in what became his "Office of Scientific Investigation" (OSI) trilogy that was followed by Riders to the Stars (1954) and Gog (1954), both the same year. The following year came the syndicated television series Science Fiction Theater (1955–1957).

Tors produced two Korean War films, Battle Taxi (1955) and Underwater Warrior (1958).

He created the first-run syndicated underwater action and adventure series Sea Hunt (1958–1961), starring Lloyd Bridges, and The Aquanauts (1960–1961), starring Keith Larsen, Jeremy Slate, and Ron Ely, which was later renamed Malibu Run. He also created NBC's science fiction series The Man and the Challenge, starring George Nader and Jack Ging and was the executive producer of the first-run syndicated skydiving action and adventure series Ripcord, starring Larry Pennell and Ken Curtis.

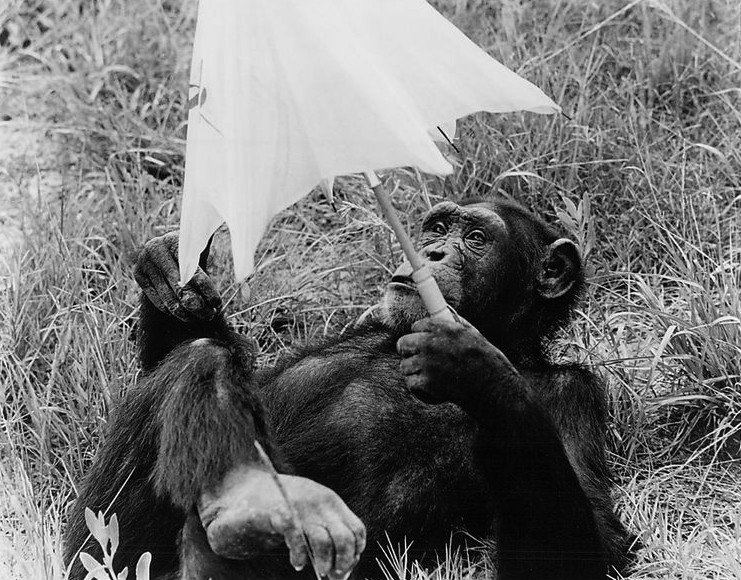
Judy the Chimp, who was a regular on Daktari, also had a role in Jambo.

In the 1960s, Tors left science fiction and concentrated on making films and television series involving animals. He typically would make a film first and then develop a television series based on that film. His animal films included Flipper (1963), Flipper's New Adventure (1964), Zebra in the Kitchen (1965), Clarence, the Cross-Eyed Lion (1965), Gentle Giant (1967), and Africa Texas Style (1967). He also directed Rhino! (1964), and Galyon (1977).

Tors appeared as himself on the February 14, 1966 episode of the CBS game show To Tell the Truth. He received two votes.

His animal-themed television adventure series included Flipper, Daktari, Gentle Ben, Cowboy in Africa, and Jambo, a documentary series set in Africa. He was also the executive producer of MGM Television's 1967 TV series Off to See the Wizard for ABC.

His production company, Ivan Tors Films, did the underwater filming for the James Bond film Thunderball as well as filming his own Around the World Under the Sea for MGM and Daring Game and Hello Down There for Paramount. Tors' studio also filmed Soupy Sales' film debut in Birds Do It.

== Personal life ==
Tors was married to film actress Constance Dowling from 1955 until her death in 1969. Tors died 14 years later, eight days before his 67th birthday. He died due to a heart attack in Mato Grosso, Brazil, where he was scouting a new television series.

== Legacy ==
In 1989, the Academy of Underwater Arts & Sciences posthumously awarded Tors a NOGI Award in Arts.
In 1996, Ivan's son Peter returned to his father's brand of wildlife-based family entertainment with Looking for Trouble, made in collaboration with Roger Corman's New Concorde. On the heels of this film, he and brother David briefly reformed Ivan Tors Productions. The company's former head of development Kerry Cardinale also rejoined. They aimed to produce three films inspired by Ivan's dormant projects, with Sterling Entertainment touted as a likely backer. However, there is no indication that it happened.
