= Gentle Giant (film) =

1967 film by James Neilson

- Theatrical release poster
- Directed by: James Neilson
- Screenplay by: Edward J. Lakso; Andy White
- Produced by: Ivan Tors
- Starring: Dennis Weaver; Vera Miles; Ralph Meeker; Clint Howard; Huntz Hall; Charles Martin; Rance Howard
- Cinematography: Howard Winner
- Edited by: Peter Colbert
- Music by: Samuel Matlovsky
- Production company: Ivan Tors Productions
- Distributed by: Paramount Pictures
- Release date: November 15, 1967
- Running time: 93 minutes
- Country: United States
- Language: English

Gentle Giant is a 1967 American drama film about a young boy's friendship with an American black bear, based on the 1965 book Gentle Ben by Walt Morey. It was produced by Ivan Tors, directed by James Neilson and written by Edward J. Lakso and Andy White. The film stars Clint Howard, Dennis Weaver, Vera Miles, Ralph Meeker, Huntz Hall, and Bruno the Bear. The film was released on November 15, 1967, by Paramount Pictures.

The film was also the pilot for the CBS TV series, Gentle Ben (1967–69), based on the same characters and also starring Clint Howard, Dennis Weaver, and Bruno. The film is a prequel to the TV series, providing the backstory of how the boy Mark Wedloe met Ben the bear, tamed him and adopted him as a companion. Originally, the film was scheduled for release before the TV series began to air, but the film's release date was changed to be closer to Thanksgiving 1967, meaning that the film came out after the TV series had already been running for about two months. Gentle Giant therefore served as additional promotion for the Gentle Ben TV series rather than introducing it.

== Plot ==
Tom and Ellen Wedloe live with their young son Mark near a Florida game reserve. Tom is a pilot who works as a spotter to locate schools of fish for the local fishermen to catch, but recently fish have been scarce, causing economic hardship for the local fishermen and Tom. Young Mark loves animals of all kinds.

One day Mark is exploring the reserve when he encounters a black bear cub, and starts to make friends with it, only to have the protective mother bear appear and chase Mark up a tree. While still hidden in the tree, Mark watches, horrified, as a gang of poachers, led by local fisherman and bully Fog Hanson, illegally shoot the mother bear and capture the cub. Mark reports the poaching to the local wildlife officer, who fines Fog. The angry Fog and his buddies try to beat up Tom in retaliation for Mark's reporting and because they blame Tom for not spotting any fish for them lately, but Tom and his friend (the local justice of the peace) win the fight and throw Fog and his gang off the pier.

Fog inhumanely chains the captured cub in a dark shack with inadequate food or exercise. Despite his parents' warnings to stay away from Fog's property, Mark sneaks onto Fog's property repeatedly to feed and exercise the cub, whom he names Ben. As Ben grows bigger, he and Mark become close friends.

Eventually, Fog catches Mark trespassing. Tom forbids Mark from ever visiting Ben again, while Fog plans to kill Ben and sell him for meat. Mark disregards his father's warning to rescue Ben, taking him into the wilderness to set him free. However, Ben refuses to leave Mark, and the pair are caught. Tom finally buys Ben from Fog to save Ben's life.

Mark and Ben are happy for a time, but when walking with Ben one day, Fog and his gang show up and threaten Mark and Ben. Ben finally fights back and mauls Fog. Because Ben has now attacked a person, even though Mark argues it was justified, the Wedloes are forced to give Ben away to a zoo. Mark sadly says goodbye to Ben as his cage is loaded onto a boat for the trip to the zoo. En route to the zoo, Ben breaks out of his cage and swims ashore, escaping into the woods.

Meanwhile, Tom's plane crashes, leading him to accept a job as a wildlife officer in the Everglades. While searching for poachers, Tom is charged by a large bear and recognizes the bear as Ben. Mark is excited to hear that Ben is nearby and insists Ben wouldn't do any harm, but Tom disagrees, stating that Ben has become dangerous and must be killed. Tom hunts for Ben with his rifle, and Mark follows, trying to save Ben. Tom finally spots Ben and is about to fire when a tree suddenly falls on Tom and pins him to the ground. At Mark's direction, Ben gently rolls the tree off Tom. Ben then leads Tom and Mark to his new "family" — a female bear and newborn cubs that he was protecting when he first charged Tom. In view of circumstances, Tom spares Ben's life, and Ben and Mark renew their friendship.

== Cast ==
- Clint Howard as Mark Wedloe
- Dennis Weaver as Tom Wedloe
- Vera Miles as Ellen Wedloe
- Ralph Meeker as Fog Hanson
- Huntz Hall as Dink Smith
- Charles Martin as Mike McDonaugh
- Rance Howard as Tater Coughlin
- Frank Schuller as Charlie Mason
- Robertson White as Swenson
- Richard O'Barry as Mate
- James Riddle as Skipper
- Jerry Newby as Townsman
- Frank Logan as Townsman
- Levirne DeBord as Fisherman
- Alfred Metz as Fisherman
- Bruno the Bear as Ben

== Production ==
Gentle Giant was another in a line of animal films for family audiences made by Ivan Tors during the 1960s, several of which spawned television series. His previous animal films had included Flipper (1963) (the basis for the TV series of the same name), Zebra in the Kitchen (1965), and Clarence, the Cross-Eyed Lion (1965) (the basis for the TV series Daktari). Gentle Giant likewise provided the basis for the TV series Gentle Ben. The film was also originally titled Gentle Ben. In an arrangement unusual at the time, CBS provided funding for the film in exchange for the rights to show the film on television after it had finished its United States movie theater run.

The original Walt Morey novel was set in Alaska and involved a brown bear native to that state. For the film, the setting was changed to Florida, which was also the location of the Miami-based film studio established by Tors, and the bear was changed to an American black bear indigenous to the Everglades. Filming was done at Ivan Tors' studio, in Miami, in the fishing town of Port Salerno, Florida (P.O. Smith's Grocery, a local landmark, was shown in the film), in Palm Beach Gardens, Florida, and at locations in the Everglades.

The film was one of Clint Howard's first feature film appearances and his first in a leading role, although he had made numerous appearances as a child actor on television shows. According to Clint's father Rance Howard (who also appeared in the film as one of Fog Hanson's gang), to audition for the role Clint, then aged 6, was required to do a screen test with Bruno the Bear, who knocked Clint down in the middle of the audition. Bruno then swung his head from side to side in a behavior that shows impatience in bears. Clint responded by getting back up, yanking Bruno's neck chain while ordering him to listen, and continuing the audition; Bruno settled down. Tors was impressed that the six-year-old boy was "not afraid of bears."

Animals for the film, including Bruno, the bear who mainly played the part of adult Ben, were provided and trained by Ralph Helfer's Africa U.S.A. animal ranch. In addition to Bruno, the film included several other black bears that portrayed Ben's mother, Ben's mate, Ben's cubs and/or Ben at different stages in his life. According to trainer Derrick Rosaire Sr. and his son Derrick Rosaire II, Rosaire Sr. owned a trained female black bear that played Ben's mother and also played Ben in some scenes of the film. Rosaire Sr. named the bear "Gentle Ben" and exhibited it for years after the film at circuses, talk shows and other events.

== See also ==
- The Life and Times of Grizzly Adams (1974)
- List of American films of 1967
