= The Courage of Kavik the Wolf Dog =

- Based on: Kävik the Wolf Dog by Walt Morey
- Written by: George Malko
- Directed by: Peter Carter
- Starring: Ronny Cox; Linda Sorenson; Andrew Ian McMillan
- Music by: Harry Freedman
- Countries of origin: United States; Canada
- Original language: English

Production
- Running time: 100 minutes

Original release
- Release: January 20, 1980

The Courage of Kavik the Wolf Dog, also known as Kavik the Wolf Dog, is a 1980 made-for-TV adventure film based on the 1968 novel Kävik the Wolf Dog.

== Plot ==
Kavik, a champion sled dog, who has just won a race in Alaska, is sold for $4000 to George Hunter, a ruthless businessman from Seattle, who has local business interests. The plane carrying the dog crashes into the snow-covered wilderness; the pilot is killed and the dog is more dead than alive.

The crash site is found by Andy Evans, a young boy who lives in the nearby fishing settlement of Copper City. He struggles to get the dog home and begs his parents to let him ask the local doctor to take a look at Kavik. Dr Walker does, initially reluctantly, have a look and does his best to deal with Kavik's multiple injuries. The dog slowly recovers and starts to bond with Andy. However, due to its near death experience Kavik is terrified of other dogs and is quick to run away when confronted. But Hunter arrives on a regular trip and claims back the dog, taking him to a kennel in his palatial Seattle home.

Hunter's kennel manager, seeing that the dog is unhappy and unlikely to be a champion racer, allows him to escape. Kavik manages to stow away on a coastal ferry and travels north. He struggles over inhospitable terrain, learning to fight other dogs and wolves for his food. Barely alive, he makes it back to Copper City, and reunites with Andy.

Hunter arrives, angrily demanding the return of the dog. Andy's father, Kurt, equally angrily claims that the dog will be happier with them than with Hunter. Hunter, who employs Evans and practically owns the whole town, gives in with ill grace, selling Kavik to the Evans family for a token sum.

== Cast ==
- Ronny Cox as Kurt Evans
- Linda Sorenson as Laura Evans
- Andrew Ian McMillan as Andy Evans
- John Ireland as George Hunter
- Chris Wiggins as Dr Vic Walker
- John Candy as Pinky

== Production ==
Much of this television film was shot in Alberta's Banff National Park. Additional filming locations were in Ontario, British Columbia and Alaska.
