= List of Daktari episodes =

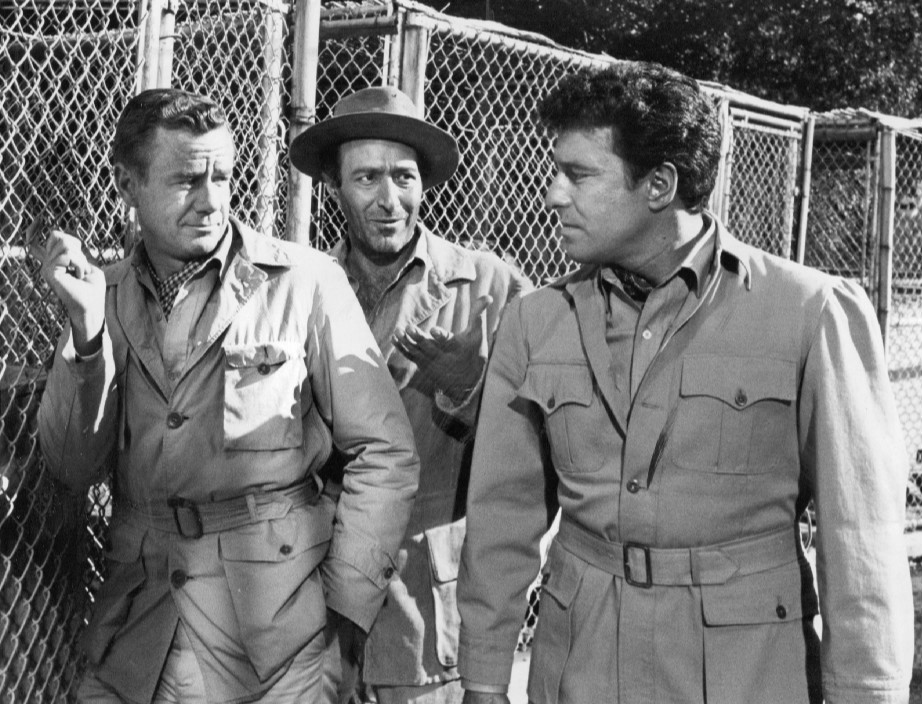
A scene from "The Diamond Smugglers," 1966.

This is a list of Daktari episodes (1966–69) in the order in which they were released.

== Series overview ==
Season	Episodes	Originally released	
Season	Episodes	First released	Last released
1	18	January 11, 1966	May 17, 1966
2	29	September 13, 1966	April 11, 1967
3	27	September 5, 1967	March 12, 1968
4	15	September 25, 1968	January 15, 1969

== Episodes ==
=== Season 1 (1966) ===
No. overall	No. in season	Title	Directed by	Written by	Original release date
1	1	"The Elephant Thieves"	Otto Lang	Robert Lewin	January 11, 1966
A baby elephant heads for Tracy's study center after a trapper kills its mother. Guest stars: Lane Bradford, Dan Ferrone
2	2	"Predator of Wameru"	Paul Landres	Meyer Dolinsky, Stephen Kandel	January 18, 1966
Dr. Tracy sets out after a poacher, who has set dozens of animal traps all over the reserve. Guest stars: Percy Rodriguez, Than Wyenn, Don Marshall
3	3	"The Killer Lion"	Otto Lang	William Clark	January 25, 1966
A game guard's old pet lioness's increasing irritability culminates in an attack on a farmer. Guest stars: Alan Napier, John McLiam, Don Marshall
4	4	"Adventure of the Lion Cubs"	Paul Landres	William Clark	February 1, 1966
Judy brings three motherless lion cubs back to Wameru; Guest stars: Sean McClory, Lawrence Montaigne
5	5	"Trail of the Cheetah"	Andrew Marton	Alan Caillou, Stephen Kandel	February 8, 1966
While Janet Lorne is visiting, an escaped murderer is reported in the vicinity. Guest stars: Dina Merrill, Ron Hayes, Don Marshall
6	6	"Leopard of Madla Gorge"	Otto Lang	Arthur Weiss	February 15, 1966
A professional hunter joins an archaeological expedition. His job: kill all predatory animals near the camp. Guest stars: Peter Brocco, Harry Lauter, Marian McCargo, Otis Young
7	7	"The Diamond Smugglers"	Paul Landres	Malvin Wald	March 1, 1966
Dr. Tracy pays a visit to two Frenchman who say they are paleontologists, but who are actually diamond smugglers. Guest stars: Richard Angarola, Nico Minardos, Paul Winfield
8	8	"The Chimp Who Went Ape"	Otto Lang	Robert Lewin	March 1966
Judy the Chimp angers a family of wild chimpanzees when she brings an injured young chimp to the study center.
9	9	"The Killer Dog"	Paul Landres	William Clark	March 15, 1966
A foul-tempered farmer has trained his German shepherd dog to attack any and all animals from the Wameru reserve. Paula and Jack Dane find the animal caught in a poacher's snare, rescue it, and take it back to Dr. Tracy to be treated and, more importantly, re-trained — a prospect that's not likely to sit well with the dog's owner. Guest star: George Mitchell
10	10	"Return of the Killer: Part 1"	Andrew Marton	Richard Carlson	March 22, 1966
After escaping from prison, a wounded killer heads for Wameru to receive medical aid. Guest stars: Jan Clayton, Ron Hayes
11	11	"Return of the Killer: Part 2"	Andrew Marton	Richard Carlson	March 29, 1966
Held at gunpoint, Paula must try to remove a bullet from escaped killer Roy Meadows. Guest star: Ron Hayes
12	12	"The Man-Eater of Wameru"	Paul Landres	Meyer Dolinsky	April 5, 1966
A magazine photographer looking for a story lures a hostile tribe of poachers onto the Wamera reserve, thinking that she will get some "dramatic" pictures to go with the story. Guest stars: Doris Dowling, Joe Higgins
13	13	"Crisis at the Compound"	Paul Landres	Malvin Wald	April 12, 1966
Dr. Tracy treats an injured leopard and releases it into the wild, but a visiting trade commissioner who wants to hunt for big game sets his sights on the leopard for his trophy. Dr. Tracy sets out to derail his plans. Guest stars: Gloria Manon, David Opatoshu
14	14	"The Hostages"	Andrew Marton	Stephen Kandel	April 19, 1966
Clarence the Lion and Judy the Chimp are kidnapped and held for ransom. Guest stars: Chips Rafferty, Carl Held
15	15	"Judy and the Hyena"	Paul Landres	William Clark, S.S. Schweitzer	April 26, 1966
Judy the chimp, who was once bitten by a hyena, gets nervous, scared and agitated when she sees Paul and Jack bring in an injured hyena pup. Dr. Tracy has a difficult time keeping Judy calm enough so he can work on the hyena. Guest star: Ed Prentiss
16	16	"Wall of Flames: Part 1"	Andrew Marton	Stephen Kandel	May 3, 1966
Warned against hunting on the reserve, a hunter starts a fire to drive the animals out. Guest stars: King Donovan, Michael Pate
17	17	"Wall of Flames: Part 2"	Andrew Marton	Stephen Kandel	May 10, 1966
Paula and Jack face the dangers of a brush fire started by an unscrupulous hunter. Guest stars: King Donovan, Michael Pate
18	18	"Judy and the Gunrunners"	Andrew Marton	Richard Carlson	May 17, 1966
Tracy lends a helping hand to Dr. Akubar, a gunrunner posing as an archaeologist. Guest star: Theodore Marcuse

=== Season 2 (1966–67) ===
No. overall	No. in season	Title	Directed by	Written by	Original release date
19	1	"The Return of Clarence"	Paul Landres	William Clark	September 13, 1966
Clarence the cross-eyed lion, normally a gentle soul, starts acting oddly after receiving a blow to the head in a jeep accident, becoming edgy, hard to control and growling at everybody. Dr. Tracy suspects that the blow has given Clarence amnesia, a diagnosis seemingly confirmed when Clarence suddenly takes a nasty swipe at Paula.
20	2	"Deadline to Kill"	John Florea	Andy White	September 20, 1966
A rancher releases cattle in a plan to entice lions and leopards to kill them, thus giving the rancher an excuse to drive Dr. Tracy from the area and claim the reserve's land. Dr. Tracy must round up the cattle before the big cats become livestock killers. Guest star: Linden Chiles
21	3	"Daktari's Last Hunt"	John Florea	Stephen Kandel	September 27, 1966
A big-game hunter, angry at Dr. Tracy for closing off the reserve to hunting, stalks Dr. Tracy and Judy through the wild, trying to prove that Dr. Tracy will have to kill an animal to survive. Guest star: Jack Kelly
22	4	"Judy's Hour of Peril"	John Florea	Arthur Weiss	October 4, 1966
Judy the chimp switches the vial used for her regular fever shot, causing Paula to accidentally inject her with a deadly virus. Judy then wanders off into the wild. Her human and animal friends race against time to find her and give her the necessary antidote before it's too late.
23	5	"Cheetah at Large"	Paul Landres	Malvin Wald	October 11, 1966
The Emir of Asambana's prize cheetah is sick, and may not be able to race in an important contest with a rival tribe. The Emir threatens to cut off the Wamera reserve from using the water on his property unless Dr. Tracy cures his cheetah in time for the race. Guest star: Raymond St. Jacques
24	6	"The Test"	Paul Landres	Lawrence Louis Goldman	October 18, 1966
Mike searches in the jungle for a tribal chief's son, who has fled into the bush in an attempt to prove to everyone that he's not a coward. Guest stars: Rupert Crosse, D'Urville Martin
25	7	"Born to Die"	John Florea	Alf Harris & Jack Jacobs	October 25, 1966
A pregnant black leopard with a history of killing her previous cubs and attacking her trainer is brought to the center in hopes that Dr. Tracy can change her behavior. However, Judy fails to lock her cage and she escapes. Paula is forced to play midwife when she finds the leopard in the bush about to give birth.
26	8	"The Trial"	Paul Landres	William Clark	November 1, 1966
Dr. Tracy serves as defense counsel for his trained elephant, who is being put on trial by the locals for going on a rampage in a local village and injuring the chief. Guest stars: Henri Brown, Robert DoQui
27	9	"Death in the African Sun"	Paul Landres	D.D. Oldland	November 15, 1966
Jack is out driving his jeep in the bush with Judy the chimp when the vehicle stalls out. With no water, they're forced to leave the jeep and try to make their way back through the drought-stricken jungle. Jack decides to follow a herd of giraffes, hoping that the animals will lead them to water.
28	10	"Revenge of the Leopard"	John Florea	Cornelius Ballard	November 22, 1966
Dr. Tracy agrees to escort a wealthy, beautiful woman on a filming safari. Unbeknownst to him, the woman's real objective is to find, track and kill a legendary leopard that killed her father years before. Guest star: Doris Dowling
29	11	"Shoot to Kill"	Paul Landres	Malvin Wald	November 29, 1966
A sick circus bear escapes into the bush, and Dr. Tracy tries to find it before worried local ranchers kill it, fearful that it will contaminate their water supply. Guest stars: Trevor Bardette, Joan Huntington, Troy Melton, Gil Perkins, Bruno the Bear
30	12	"Cry for Help"	Paul Landres	J.E. Selby (aka Robert Lees) & Stanley H. Silverman	December 6, 1966
Dr. Tracy goes looking for a self-styled tribal "healer" he ran out of the area when he finds that the man has the antidote for the venom of a deadly spider that has just bitten Paula. Guest stars: Gene Boland, Godfrey Cambridge, Davis Roberts, Paul Winfield
31	13	"Clarence the Killer"	Paul Landres	Robert Lewin	December 20, 1966
A hunter plots to close the Wameru reserve by turning loose a killer lion against Dr. Tracy and then blaming Clarence for the doctor's death. Guest stars: Joe Higgins, William Stevens
32	14	"The Chimp Who Cried Wolf"	John Florea	Richard Tuber	December 27, 1966
A TV comedian visits Dr. Tracy's compound to record the sounds made by animals, but his bumbling disrupts the compound and endangers the lives of Clarence, Judy and Paula. Guest star: Morey Amsterdam
33	15	"Little Miss Nightingale"	Marshall Thompson	Robert L. Goodwin & Marvin Wald	January 3, 1967
While Mike is riding in his jeep with Judy the chimp and Clarence the lion, the jeep overturns, pinning Mike underneath it. Mike's survival is dependent on Judy fending off predatory wild animals and Clarence carrying an emergency message back to the study center.
34	16	"Judy and the Gorilla"	Paul Landres	Malvin Wald	January 10, 1967
Two hunters raid the Wameru reserve to steal some very valuable animals, kidnapping Judy in the process. Dr. Tracy has to stop them. Guest stars: Virginia Mayo, Michael O'Shea
35	17	"House of Lions"	John Florea	Gilbert A. Ralston	January 17, 1967
An injured and potentially dangerous lioness escapes from Dr. Tracy's compound. Clarence tries to stop her, but ends up injured by a spear from a native's trap and stranded in a hut with a family of wild lions. Dr. Tracy, Paula and Jack attempt to rescue Clarence.
36	18	"Undercover Judy"	Dick Moder	Leigh Chapman	January 24, 1967
Hedley accompanies an officer and his Nazi prisoner on a mission to locate microfilm evidence against the Nazi and his cohorts that is supposedly buried on the reserve. However, the officer and prisoner are actually two former German soldiers looking for a cache of buried diamonds. Their plan goes awry when Hedley gives the package of diamonds to Judy, who hides them. Guest stars: Alan Hewitt, Frank Marth
37	19	"Countdown for Paula"	John Florea	Fenton Hobart Jr.	January 31, 1967
Paula and Dr. Tracy work to remove wildlife from an area soon to be flooded when hydraulic engineers dynamite a levee. An impatient engineer, not knowing that Paula is in the area and annoyed over the time lost saving animals, sets off the dynamite ahead of schedule, releasing a wall of floodwater and endangering Paula's life. Guest stars: Gregory Morton, Vince Howard
38	20	"Terror in the Bush"	Paul Landres	Maria Little & Jim Simmons	February 7, 1967
A jeep accident out in the bush results in Dr. Tracy being seriously injured. Paula and Judy the chimp are the only ones with him and have to find a way to get him safely back through the wild to where he can get medical attention.
39	21	"Judy and the Baby Elephant"	Dick Moder	Malvin Wald	February 14, 1967
A baby elephant is attacked by a leopard and needs medical care, but the adult wild elephants won't let anyone near the injured baby. Dr. Tracy and Judy the chimp must find a way to help the baby elephant before it's too late.
40	22	"A Bullet for Hedley"	Paul Landres	Alan Caillou	February 21, 1967
A vicious jewel thief threatens to murder Hedley unless Dr. Tracy gives him a pouch of stolen diamonds that, unknown to him, were taken by Judy the chimp. Guest stars: Lionel Kranitz, Alan Caillou
41	23	"Judy the Poacher"	Lawrence J. Goldman	Lawrence L. Goldman	February 28, 1967
Dr. Tracy and Jack ask Hedley to investigate the disappearance of several baby animals from the compound. Hedlay soon finds the one responsible for the thefts: it's Judy the chimp. Guest star: Rex Ingram
42	24	"Goodbye, Mike Makula"	Marshall Thompson	S.S. Schweitzer & Malvin Wald	March 7, 1967
Mike is attracted to a beautiful visitor to the compound, who offers him an important job back in the U.S. with a foundation she is setting up. But Mike's friends find evidence that the job offer isn't what it appears to be, and try to stop him from leaving. Guest star: Janet MacLachlan
43	25	"Operation Springtime"	Paul Landres	J.E. Selby (aka Robert Lees) & Stanley H. Silverman	March 14, 1967
The coming of spring at the Wameru reserve finds Jack and Mike attempting to hatch abandoned ostrich eggs, with help from Judy the chimp and Clarence the cross-eyed lion.
44	26	"King Clarence"	Paul Landres	Alf Harris & Jack Jacobs	March 21, 1967
A valuable royal lion cub needs a blood transfusion, and Clarence has the type of blood needed, but he seems to have disappeared. Dr. Tracy and his friends fan out to find him and save the cub's life. Guest star: Peter Mamakos
45	27	"The Long Hunt"	Dick Moder	William Clark	March 28, 1967
The nephew of an Indian sultan visits the compound, but his real objective is the revenge killing of a tiger previously donated by his uncle. Only Judy realizes his plan, and saves the tiger several times until Dr. Tracy catches on to the plot. Guest star: Harvey Jason
46	28	"Judy and the Vulture"	Paul Landres	Worley Thorne	April 4, 1967
Judy the chimp and Clarence the lion "adopt" a vulture as their new friend and playmate, but they don't know that the bird is carrying a lethal virus that makes Clarence very ill. Guest star: George Mitchell
47	29	"A Cub Called Danger"	Dick Moder	John Fraley Hogan	April 11, 1967
Paula discovers a lioness is not feeding her cub. Despite her father's warnings not to interfere with nature, Paula and Judy decide to "rescue" the cub, endangering the lives of Paula, the cub, and Clarence the lion.

=== Season 3 (1967–68) ===
No. overall	No. in season	Title	Directed by	Written by	Original release date
48	1	"Judy and the Astro-Chimp"	Paul Landres	Malvin Wald	September 5, 1967
Dr. Tracy faces a predicament when Judy trades places with a chimp who has been trained for the astronaut program, who has somehow made its way into the compound and gotten lost. Guest stars: Robert Clarke, Davis Roberts
49	2	"The Execution"	Dick Moder	Lawrence Louis Goldman	September 12, 1967
A mother leopard behaves strangely by attacking Dr. Tracy and Hedley, but abandoning its cub. Rather than destroy the leopard, Dr. Tracy operates on the leopard for a brain tumour while Judy secretly adopts the cub.
50	3	"Crime Wave at Wameru"	Paul Landres	Story by : Ted Herbert; Teleplay by : Lawrence Louis Goldman	September 19, 1967
A stern, no-nonsense sergeant has been sent to replace District Officer Hedley. In an effort to save his job, Judy and her animal friends kidnap a lion cub. Guest stars: Robert DoQui, Peter Mamakos, Albert Popwell
51	4	"Goodbye, Wameru"	Dick Moder	Malvin Wald	September 26, 1967
A well-known African journalist is determined to discredit Wameru in print. Jack, Mike and Paula try to come up with a plan to stop him, but in the end Judy has the best plan and saves the day. Guest star: Clarence Williams III
52	5	"Killer Tribe"	Paul Landres	Robert Lewin	October 3, 1967
A search party is sent out to look for Judy when it's discovered that she has left the compound with a stranger suspected of being a member of a very dangerous tribe. Guest star: Don Pedro Colley
53	6	"The Scent of Fear"	Dick Moder	Richard Carlson	October 10, 1967
A new game warden comes to the compound to be trained by Dr. Tracy, but he doesn't get along well with the animals, and is forced to confront an old fear. Guest star: Nico Minardos
54	7	"The Return of the Phantom"	Paul Landres	S.S. Schweitzer	October 17, 1967
A hunter and Dr. Tracy are both stalking a famous leopard, as Dr. Tracy tries to save the leopard from the hunter. Guest star: Percy Rodriguez
55	8	"Countdown for Judy"	John Florea	William Clark	October 24, 1967
Judy becomes gravely ill after eating some berries sprayed with poison by a new farmer. Dr. Tracy and his team race against the clock to save Judy by finding out the source and nature of the poison in order to give an antidote. Guest star: Karl Swenson
56	9	"Judy and the Jailbirds"	Paul Landres	Story by : Ted Herbert; Teleplay by : Malvin Wald	October 31, 1967
Dr. Tracy finds himself involved in a scheme by two old ex-cons, who want to return to the safety and comfort of their jail cell, to get caught breaking into the safe in Hedley's office so they can be sent back to prison. Guest stars: Sterling Holloway, Leonid Kinskey, Albert Popwell
57	10	"One of Our Cubs Is Missing"	Dick Moder	Alan Caillou	November 7, 1967
58	11	"Judy and the Thoroughbred"	John Florea	Jack Jacobs	November 14, 1967
59	12	"The Return of Ethel and Albert"	Paul Landres	William Clark	November 21, 1967
Leaving an injured Headley in charge of the compound, Dr. Tracy and his staff search for a hippo and a donkey who have become inseparable buddies. Guest star: Hedley Mattingly
60	13	"Judy and the Wizard"	Paul Landres	Alf Harris & Jack Jacobs	November 28, 1967
Dr. Tracy and his friends try to help an aging magician, whose chimpanzee is getting too old to perform. Guest star: Gil Lamb
61	14	"Clarence's Love-In"	Dick Moder	Malvin Wald	December 5, 1967
62	15	"The Elephant Raid: Part 1"	John Florea	Richard Tuber	December 12, 1967
63	16	"The Elephant Raid: Part 2"	John Florea	Richard Tuber	December 19, 1967
64	17	"Miracle in the Jungle"	Paul Landres	Malvin Wald	December 26, 1967
A man on the run from the law slips into Wameru to retrieve stolen loot he had buried there previously. What he doesn't know is that Judy the chimp had already found it and dug it up, and that Dr. Tracy has been arrested for possession of it. Guest stars: Jan Clayton, Mel Scott
65	18	"Riddle of the Bush"	Dick Moder	Robert E. Smith	January 2, 1968
66	19	"The Big Switch"	Paul Landres	Story by : Ted Herbert; Teleplay by : John Hogan	January 9, 1968
When Judy the chimp gives a revitalizing serum to an old native chief who has been banished from his tribe, he comes up with a plan to regain his honor: he's going to singlehandedly kill a lion. Guest stars: Carl Byrd, Rex Ingram
67	20	"License to Kill"	John Florea	Story by : Ted Herbert; Teleplay by : William Clark	January 16, 1968
68	21	"Judy Strikes Back"	Paul Landres	John Hogan	January 23, 1968
Dr. Tracy installs an electronic alarm system to protect more than $1 million worth of vaccine. Judy, angry that she's lost her job as guard, leads a protest against the new system that's replaced her. Guest star: Tony Monaco
69	22	"The Killer Cub"	Paul Landres	Story by : Ted Herbert; Teleplay by : Malvin Wald	January 30, 1968
Local ranchers, angry that a cheetah Dr. Tracy is treating has killed some of their cattle, give him a week to get the animal to stop, or they'll take care of the cheetah themselves. Guest star: Bruce Bennett
70	23	"Toto the Great"	John Florea	John Hogan & George Pierre	February 13, 1968
71	24	"The Lion Killer"	John Florea	Lawrence Louis Goldman	February 20, 1968
72	25	"The Killer of Wameru"	Paul Landres	J.E. Selby (aka Robert Lees) & Stanley H. Silverman	February 27, 1968
Judy is nearly killed by native hunters when she tries to help a starving lion that has wandered into the compound. The natives claim the lion has killed cattle, and Dr. Tracy must prove its innocence to get the hunters to spare its life.
73	26	"The Monster of Wameru"	John Florea	Story by : Ted Herbert; Teleplay by : Malvin Wald	March 5, 1968
A gorilla-like creature is causing panic among the locals whenever it appears. Hedley wants to kill it, while Dr. Marsh and the others want to capture and study it. Unbeknownst to them, the creature is actually a native in costume hoping to make some quick money by luring tourists to his village. Guest stars: Albert Popwell, Robert DoQui
74	27	"The Will to Live"	Paul Landres	Story by : Ted Herbert & Malvin Wald; Teleplay by : Malvin Wald	March 12, 1968
Serang the tiger gets lost and apparently reverts to wild behavior, threatening the lives of an unarmed Jack and Mike.

=== Season 4 (1968–69) ===
No. overall	No. in season	Title	Directed by	Written by	Original release date
75	1	"A Family for Jenny"	Don McDougall	Ted Herbert & Malvin Wald	September 25, 1968
Guest stars: Joan Anderson, Erin Moran
76	2	"Clarence, the Lion-Hearted"	Alan Crosland Jr.	Malvin Wald	October 2, 1968
77	3	"African Heritage"	Herbert Kenwith	Frank Telford	October 9, 1968
78	4	"The Outsider"	Dick Moder	Jack Jacobs	October 16, 1968
79	5	"Strike Like a Lion"	Alan Crosland Jr.	Malvin Wald	October 23, 1968
80	6	"Adam and Jenny"	Paul Landres	Story by : Ted Herbert & Malvin Wald; Teleplay by : Malvin Wald	October 30, 1968
Jenny Jones unwittingly causes Dr. Tracy a lot of trouble when, without telling anybody, she finds a home for a runaway orphan boy. Guest stars: Joan Anderson, Pepe Brown, Louis Gossett Jr., Erin Moran, Maidie Norman
81	7	"A Man's Man"	Paul Landres	J.E. Selby (aka Robert Lees)	November 6, 1968
Bart Jason heads up a photographic safari for wealthy oilman Chet Rainey and his shy son Ted in the hopes of making them closer, but the trip seemingly widens the gulf between them. Guest stars: Eddie Applegate, Ross Hagen, Stephen McNally
82	8	"The Runaways"	Alan Crosland Jr.	Doris Dowling & Ted Herbert	November 13, 1968
Guest stars: Joan Anderson, Sid Melton
83	9	"African Showdown"	Dick Moder	Andy White	November 20, 1968
84	10	"Once Upon a Fang"	Paul Landres	Lawrence L. Goldman	November 27, 1968
A young man is banished from his tribe after he refuses to take on his father's role as the village storyteller. Ignoring Dr. Tracy's advice, he places himself in mortal danger in order to prove that he can be a great warrior. Guest stars: Adolph Caesar, Glynn Turman
85	11	"The Divining Rods"	Paul Landres	Jack Jacobs	December 11, 1968
The Wameru reserve faces the prospect of a water shortage, due to a severe drought and a water-diversion project being constructed by a stubborn engineer. Guest stars: Bruce Bennett, Brett Parker
86	12	"The Discovery"	John Florea	True Boardman	December 18, 1968
87	13	"Jungle Heartbeat"	John Florea	Richard Carlson	January 1, 1969
88	14	"A Tiger's Tale"	Dick Moder	Wallace C. Bennett & Marshall Thompson	January 8, 1969
89	15	"Judy Comes Home"	John Florea	Ted Herbert	January 15, 1969
