= Zebra in the Kitchen =

1965 film by Ivan Tors

- Theatrical release poster
- Directed by: Ivan Tors
- Screenplay by: Art Arthur
- Story by: Elgin Ciampi
- Produced by: Ivan Tors; Harry Redmond, Jr.
- Starring: Jay North; Martin Milner; Andy Devine; Joyce Meadows; Jim Davis; Dorothy Green
- Cinematography: Lamar Boren
- Edited by: Warren Adams
- Music by: Warren Barker
- Production company: Metro-Goldwyn-Mayer
- Release date: June 1965
- Running time: 92 minutes
- Country: United States
- Language: English

Zebra in the Kitchen is a 1965 American children's film produced and directed by Ivan Tors and starring Jay North in his first leading feature-film role. It also stars Martin Milner and Andy Devine, with costars Joyce Meadows and Jim Davis. The film tells the story of a boy who, when forced to give his pet mountain lion to the local zoo, becomes upset at the living conditions of the animals there and attempts to free them. Originally released by MGM as a children's matinee feature, the film has subsequently been released on home video by Warner Bros.' family-entertainment division.

== Plot ==
In a frame story, Branch Hawksbill, assistant director of a city zoo, is visited by a father and son who have a bear cub they found during a camping trip. The father tries to convince his son, Tim, that the bear should be donated to the zoo. Tim refuses, equating the zoo to a prison. Branch proceeds to tell Tim about another boy who faced a similar decision.

Chris Carlyle lives in the countryside, where he has befriended an adult male mountain lion named Sunshine. Because Chris has treated the cat as a pet since it was a cub, it is very docile and accustomed to eating human foods. When Chris's parents inform him that they are moving to the city, Chris worries that Sunshine will not survive alone in the wild. Unbeknownst to his parents, Chris sneaks Sunshine onto the back of the family's truck and brings him to their new home in the suburbs, where the mountain lion's presence quickly frightens the neighbors. Zoo director Dr. Del Hartwood, his assistant Isobel Moon, and head zookeeper Branch convince Chris to donate Sunshine to the city zoo.

When Chris visits the zoo, he is saddened to see that the animals are confined to cramped cages made of chain-link fencing. After having a nightmare about being locked in a cage himself, Chris resolves to free Sunshine. Seeing that Chris has a bond with the mountain lion, the zoo staff offer him a summer job as a junior zookeeper. Dr. Hartwood complains to members of the city's Parks and Recreation Commission that the zoo is under-funded and its facilities woefully outdated, which has resulted in injuries to some of the animals, but is advised that the politicians are unlikely to help unless pressured by public opinion.

A trio of troublemaking boys harass the zoo animals, feeding cigars to a hippopotamus. While the staff are dealing with this, Chris steals Branch's keys and opens all of the cages, setting the animals loose to wander the city. This results in a series of comedic situations including an ostrich swallowing a portable radio, a bear riding a bicycle through the streets, a zebra getting into a family's kitchen, an Asian elephant drinking a man's bathwater, and several primates invading a toy store. Public panic ensues, and the zoo staff scramble to round up the animals before the police start killing them. Councilman Pew blames Dr. Hartwood for the escape and demands his resignation. After a few hours, most of the animals have either returned to the zoo on their own or have been recaptured. The police corner Chris and Sunshine in a warehouse and are ready to shoot the mountain lion, but Dr. Hartwood manages to calm the cat by feeding it whipped cream.

To protect Chris and Dr. Hartwood, Branch turns himself in and claims that he released the animals in order to draw public attention to the plight of the zoo. At Branch's trial, Chris confesses, unwilling to let Branch take the blame. Dr. Hartwood passionately defends Chris's actions as being motivated by his love of animals, and for having shaken up the public's apathy toward the zoo. The judge dismisses the case and orders Chris to spend two hours each day working at the zoo for the rest of the summer.

As Branch concludes the story, he proudly shows Tim the new and improved zoo voted on by the city council. The fence cages have been replaced by modern, roomier, open-air exhibits. Chris works there, happily caring for Sunshine in the mountain lion's new home. Tim consents to give the bear cub to the zoo, believing that it will be happy there.

== Cast ==
- Jay North as Chris Carlyle, whose best friend is an adult male mountain lion named Sunshine. Zebra in the Kitchen was North's first starring role after the cancellation of his hit television series Dennis the Menace (1959–63).
- Martin Milner as Dr. Del Hartwood, director of the zoo
- Andy Devine as Branch Hawksbill, the head zookeeper and, later, assistant director of the zoo
- Joyce Meadows as Isobel Moon, Dr. Hartwood's assistant
- Jim Davis as Adam Carlyle, Chris's father
- Dorothy Green as Anne Carlyle, Chris's mother
- Karen Green as Wilma Carlyle, Chris's cousin
- Vaughn Taylor as Councilman Pew, a member of the Parks and Recreation Commission who is critical of Dr. Hartwood and blames him for the animals' escape
- John Milford as Sergeant Freebee, a police officer assigned to kill any of the animals that the zoo team is unable to capture
- Tris Coffin as Councilman Lawrence, a member of the Parks and Recreation Commission who is supportive of Dr. Hartwood's efforts for the zoo
- Merritt Bohn as the Chief of Police
- Robert Clarke as the Sheriff
- Percy Helton as Mr. Richardson, a farmer who refuses Chris's request to take care of Sunshine when the Carlyles move to the city
- Jimmy Stiles as Tim, a young boy with a pet bear cub he is reluctant to donate to the zoo
- Dal Jenkins, Gordon Wescourt, and Gary Judis as Kookie, Ribs, and Greenie, three troublemakers who harass the zoo animals
- Robert Lowery as Preston Heston, a big-game hunter who volunteers to help stop the escaped animals by killing them
- Wayne Thomas as a newscaster
- Doodles Weaver as a nearsighted man who mistakes a dromedary for a person
- Jon Lormer as the judge
- Vince Barnett as a man in a manhole who is frightened by some of the escaped apes
- Phil Arnold as a man whose bathwater is drunk by an Asian elephant
- Eddie Quillan as a man watching television who is interrupted by a chimpanzee. The character is watching Hollywood Party (1934), in which Quillan had a part.

== Production ==
Zebra in the Kitchen was produced and directed by Ivan Tors, who had become known for his work with children and animals following the success of his MGM films Flipper (1963) and Rhino! (1964), as well as the 1964 Flipper television series. Principal photography began in July 1964.

Trained animals were provided by Africa USA. Zebra in the Kitchen was the film debut of Bruno the Bear, who later became known for portraying the titular bear in the television series Gentle Ben (1967–69).

The shots of the "new zoo" in the closing scene were filmed at the San Diego Zoo.

Music for the film was composed by Warren Barker, and the theme song "Zebra in the Kitchen" was written by North's uncle and on-set guardian Hal Hopper and performed by the Standells.
