= Moses Gunn =

American stage and screen actor (1929–1993)

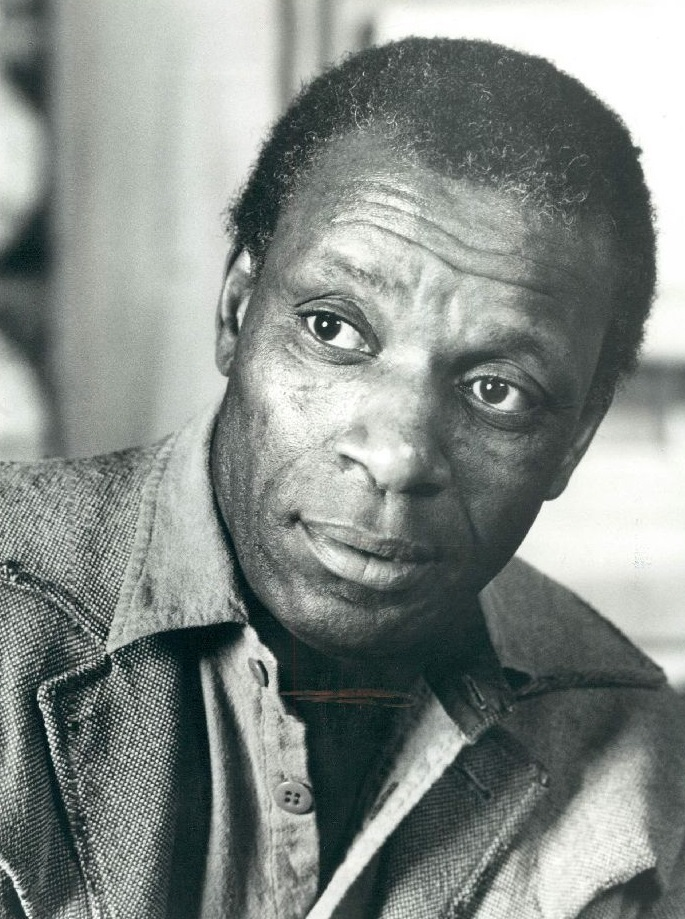
- Gunn in 1974
- Born: October 2, 1929; St. Louis, Missouri, U.S.
- Died: December 16, 1993 (aged 64); Guilford, Connecticut, U.S.
- Occupation: Actor
- Years active: 1962–1993
- Spouse: Gwendolyn Mumma Landes (m. 1966)
- Children: 2

Moses Gunn (October 2, 1929 – December 16, 1993) was an American actor of stage and screen. An Obie Award-winning stage player, he is an alumnus of the Negro Ensemble Company (NEC).

His 1962 off-Broadway debut was in Jean Genet's The Blacks, and his Broadway debut was in A Hand Is on the Gate, an evening of African-American poetry. He won an Obie Award for his portrayal of Aaron in Titus Andronicus in 1968, he was nominated for the 1976 Tony Award for Best Actor in a Play for his performance in The Poison Tree, and he also played Othello on Broadway in 1970.

For his screen performances, Gunn is best known for his roles as Clotho in WUSA (1970), Bumpy Jonas in Shaft (1971) and Joe Kagan on Little House on the Prairie (1977–1981). His final acting role was in Homicide: Life on the Street (1993), portraying murder suspect Risley Tucker in the episode "Three Men and Adena".

== Early life, family and education ==
Gunn was born in St. Louis, Missouri. He was the son of Mary and George Gunn, a laborer, and was one of seven siblings. After his mother died, his family separated. Moses left home and rode the railroad at just 12 years old. He returned to St. Louis and attended school while living at the home of Jewel Richie, his English teacher.

He graduated from Tennessee State University, where he became a member of Omega Psi Phi fraternity Rho Psi chapter. After serving in the United States Army, he attended graduate school at the University of Kansas, earning a master's degree. He taught briefly at Grambling College before attempting an acting career in New York City.

== Career ==
A character actor of film and television, Gunn also enjoyed a successful career on stage. He made his New York City stage debut in the original off-Broadway production of Jean Genet's The Blacks (1962). He performed many Shakespearean roles in Joseph Papp's Shakespeare in the Park, winning an Obie Award for his portrayal of Aaron in Titus Andronicus.

Gunn won a second Obie for his work in the NEC produced First Breeze of Summer, which moved to Broadway. His performance as Othello at the Stratford, Connecticut, Shakespeare Festival moved to Broadway in 1970.

Other Broadway plays in which Gunn performed were: A Hand Is on the Gate, Twelfth Night, I Have a Dream, and The Poison Tree. He received a 1976 Tony Award nomination for Best Actor for The Poison Tree. In 1977, he narrated the film Black Presence in the Era of the American Revolution, produced by US Information Agency.

In 1991, he toured in a production of Athol Fugard's "My Children! My Africa!" the role of Mr. M, which included a run at Baltimore's Center Stage Theater.

He may be best remembered in film for his portrayal of mobster Ellsworth Raymond "Bumpy" Jonas in the first two Shaft movies, Booker T. Washington in the 1981 movie Ragtime, a performance which won him an NAACP Image Award, and as Cairon, the Childlike Empress's imperial physician, in the 1984 film The NeverEnding Story.

He was nominated for a Primetime Emmy Award in 1977 for the role of Kintango in the television mini-series Roots. He also co-starred with Avery Brooks on the television series A Man Called Hawk. Gunn appeared as atheist shop owner Carl Dixon in six episodes of Good Times, as boxer-turned-farmer Joe Kagan on Little House on the Prairie, and as Moses Gage in Father Murphy. In 1989, Gunn appeared in two episodes of The Cosby Show as two different characters. His final acting role was in 1993 as murder suspect Risley Tucker in "Three Men and Adena", an episode of Homicide: Life on the Street.

== Personal life and death ==
Gunn married Gwendolyn Mumma Landes in 1966, becoming stepfather to her daughter Kirsten Sarah Landes. In 1970, they had a son, Justin, who became a musician and composer in the Copenhagen-based band, The Reverend Shine Snake Oil Co.

Gunn died from complications of asthma in Guilford, Connecticut on December 16, 1993, aged 64.

== Film and television ==
- 1964: Nothing But a Man as Mill Hand
- 1968: What's So Bad About Feeling Good? (uncredited)
- 1970: Carter's Army (TV Movie) as Private Doc Hayes
- 1970: WUSA as Clotho
- 1970: The Great White Hope as Scipio
- 1971: Wild Rovers as Ben
- 1971: Shaft as Bumpy Jonas
- 1971: The Sheriff (ABC Movie of the Week) as Cliff Wilder
- 1971: Hawaii Five-O (TV Series) as Willy Stone
- 1972: Eagle in a Cage as General Gourgaud
- 1972: The Hot Rock as Dr. Amusa
- 1972: Shaft's Big Score as Bumpy Jonas
- 1972: Haunts of the Very Rich (ABC Movie of the Week) as Seacrist
- 1973: Kung Fu (TV Series) as Isaac Montoya
- 1973: The Iceman Cometh as Joe Mott
- 1974: Amazing Grace as Welton J. Waters
- 1975: The Jeffersons (TV Series) as Monk Davis
- 1975: Cornbread, Earl and Me as Benjamin Blackwell
- 1975: Rollerball as Cletus
- 1975: Movin' On (TV Series) as Otis Andrews
- 1975: Aaron Loves Angela as Ike
- 1975: The Secret of the Pond (Disney TV Movie) as Sharbee
- 1977: Good Times (TV Series) as Carl Dixon
- 1977: Roots (TV Mini-Series) as Kintango
- 1977–1981: Little House on the Prairie (TV Series) as Joe Kagan
- 1977: Quincy M.E. (TV Series) as Ben McDade
- 1978: Remember My Name (1978) as Pike
- 1978: Vega$ (TV Series) as Domo
- 1980: The Ninth Configuration as Major Nammack
- 1981: Ragtime as Booker T. Washington
- 1982: Amityville II: The Possession as Detective Turner
- 1984: The NeverEnding Story as Cairon
- 1984: Firestarter as Dr. Herman Pynchot
- 1985: Certain Fury (1985) as Dr. Lewis Freeman
- 1985: Highway to Heaven (TV Series) as Ted Tilley
- 1986: Heartbreak Ridge as Staff Sergeant Webster
- 1987: Bates Motel (TV Movie) as Henry Watson
- 1987: Leonard Part 6 as Giorgio Francozzi
- 1988: Dixie Lanes as Isaac
- 1989: The Luckiest Man in the World (voice)
- 1989: A Man Called Hawk (TV Series) as "Old Man"
- 1989: Amen (TV Series) as Benjamin Tillman
- 1989: The Cosby Show (TV Series) as Joe Kendall / Dr. Lotus
- 1989: The Women of Brewster Place (TV Series) as Ben
- 1990: Tales From The Crypt (TV Series) as Uncle Ezra
- 1991: Perfect Harmony (TV Movie) as Zeke
- 1991: Brother Future (TV Movie) as Isaac
- 1993–1996: Homicide: Life on the Street (TV Series) as Risley Tucker (final appearance)
