= The Secret of the Pond =

1975 Disney television film

- Genre: Adventure
- Based on: The Pond by Robert Murphy
- Directed by: Robert Day
- Starring: Eric Shea; Ike Eisenmann; Moses Gunn
- Composer: Buddy Baker
- Country of origin: United States
- Original language: English

Production
- Producer: James Algar
- Production company: Walt Disney Productions

Original release
- Network: NBC
- Release: October 5 – October 12, 1975

The Secret of the Pond is a 1975 American television adventure film produced by Walt Disney Productions for The Wonderful World of Disney. Directed by Robert Day, it aired in two parts on October 5 and October 12, 1975.

The film was based on Robert Murphy's 1964 novel The Pond, which won the Dutton Animal Book Award.

The film was produced by James Algar, art direction by John B. Mansbridge and Jack T. Collis, set decoration by Hal Gausman, and music by Buddy Baker.

Caddo Lake was used as one of the filming locations, along with Karnack and Marshall, Texas.

The film included the song "There's a Place for You", performed by Steve Gillette.

Coverage noted that Moses Gunn's role as Sharbee, a mysterious backwoods character, was very different from his own life and background.

The Tampa Tribune described the film's setting as having "eerie beauty", with waterways separating civilization from an "ominous primeval swamp".

A review distributed by King Features Syndicate said that "the scenery turns out to be the best part of the hour". Film critic Richard Gray reviewed The Secret of the Pond on Letterboxd, describing it as having an "odd vibe", a persistent sense of menace, and Buddy Baker's "moody score".

== Cast ==
- Eric Shea as Joey
- Ike Eisenmann as Odie White
- Moses Gunn as Sharbee
- Anthony Zerbe as Sam
- John McLiam as Uncle Ben
- Robert Sampson as Joe Moncrief
- Rex Corley as Claude
