= Dutton Animal Book Award =

American literary award

Dutton Animal Book Award was an American literary award established in 1963 by publisher E. P. Dutton to recognize a previously unpublished work of fiction or non-fiction relating to animals. The reward for the winner was a $7,500 to $15,000 advanced against royalties after publication of the book by Dutton. The award was inspired by the success of Gavin Maxwell's Ring of Bright Water (1960), the story of two otters. The award was presented between 1963 and 1969; there was a 6-year hiatus with one more award presented in 1975.

== Winners ==
- 1963: Sterling North, Rascal
- 1964: Robert William Murphy, The Pond; Was turned into the 1975 television movie "The Secret of the Pond" for The Wonderful World of Disney. It starred Eric Shea and Ike Eisenmann and featured the original song “There's A Place For You” by Steve Gillette.
- 1965: Walt Morey, Gentle Ben
- 1966: Faith McNulty, The Whooping Crane: The Bird That Defies Extinction
- 1967: Daniel P. Mannix, The Fox and the Hound
- 1968: Walt Morey, Kävik the Wolf Dog
- 1969: Sterling North, The Wolfling
- 1970–74: no award
- 1975: Dayton Hyde, Strange Companion
