= Susanne Hart =

South African veterinarian

Susanne Hart, picture taken before 1974

Susanne Hart (1927 in Vienna, Austria – 2010) in South Africa), also known under the short form Sue Hart or as Susanne Harthoorn, was a South African veterinarian and environmentalist.

== Biography ==
Born in Vienna, Austria, Susanne Widrich spent most of her childhood in England. After her graduation from Heatherton House in Amersham and the Royal Veterinary College in London in 1950 she initially worked at the Purdue University in West Lafayette, Indiana. In the 1950s she moved to Port Elizabeth in South Africa where she soon married a South African named Dennis Solomon. The marriage ended in divorce after a few years and Sue Hart had to raise two children on her own. Sue Hart's second husband was veterinarian Antonie Marinus Harthoorn whom she had known since college. He was notable for the development of the M-99 (etorphine hydrochloride) capture drug and its accompanying gun, the capture gun, for darting big game animals. He was known by the Swahili name Daktari (Swahili: doctor).

In 1964, Sue and her husband moved to Kenya where they met George Adamson. Adamson became Sue Hart's mentor and she learned all about handling wild animals from him. Sue Hart and Toni Harthoorn built up a wildlife orphanage which became noteworthy for its pioneering operations on cheetahs and lions, including the eye surgery on George Adamson's lion, Ugas. After Hungarian-born American television producer Ivan Tors became aware of this project he was so impressed by the work of the Harthoorns that he used it as inspiration for the television film Clarence, the Cross-Eyed Lion and the series Daktari.

In 1967, Susanne Hart was one of the readers in the BBC children's television series Jackanory. In the mid 1970s she returned to South Africa. In 1985, Hart founded and championed the non-profit organisation Ecolink which supports children who lost their parents due to AIDS.

Dr Sue Hart died on 6 January 2010, after a stroke. Her funeral was held at Ecolink.

== Filmography ==
- 1967: Jackanory (Narrator, 5 episodes)
- 2007: The Real Daktari (German documentary about Sue Hart with interviews and original footage from her past)

== Bibliography (selected) ==
sometimes credited as Susanne Harthoorn or Sue Hart

- Hart, Susanne (1966). Too Short a Day: A Woman Vet in Africa ISBN 0-8008-7750-0
- Hart, Susanne (1969). Life with Daktari: Two Vets in East Africa ISBN 0-7138-0234-0
- Hart, Susanne (1969). The Tame and the Wild ISBN 0006119425
- Hart, Susanne (1972). Listen to the Wild ISBN 0-00-211487-9
- Hart, Susanne (1977). Back in the Wild ISBN 0-00-262049-9
- Hart, Susanne (1977). Vet in the Wild ISBN 0-00-634154-3 (Reprint of the 1972 book Listen to the Wild).
- Hart, Susanne (1987). Hold My Paw ISBN 0-947054-18-9
- Hart, Susanne (1995). Dr. Sue: A Vet in Africa ISBN 0-86975-461-0
- Hart, Susanne (2006). Tales of the Full Moon ISBN 1-55591-582-5
