= Bruno (bear actor) =

North American black bear actor

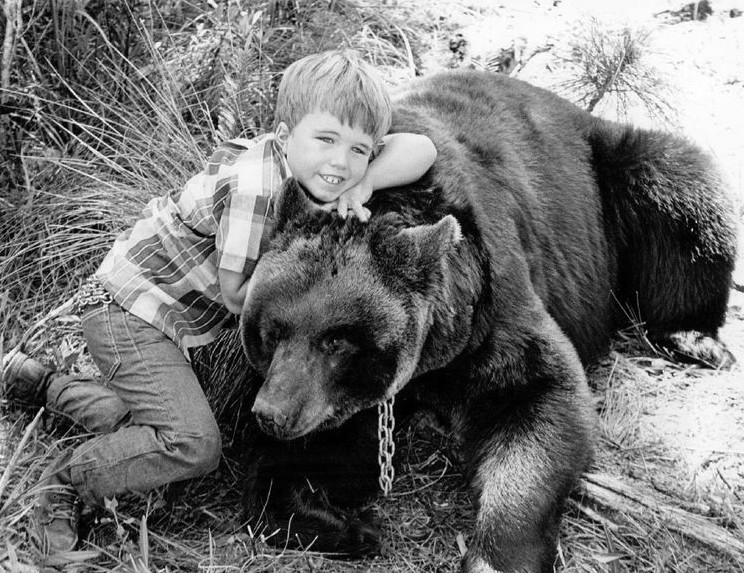
- Clint Howard with Bruno the Bear in 1967
- Other names: Ben, or Gentle Ben
- Species: North American black bear
- Sex: Male
- Born: 1962; Near White Lake, Wisconsin, U.S.
- Died: c. 1981; Acton, California, U.S.
- Occupation: Bear Actor
- Years active: 1965 – late 1970s
- Owner: Ralph Helfer
- Weight: 600–800 lb (272–363 kg)
- Height: approx. 7 ft 6 in (2.29 m)

Bruno, also called Ben or Gentle Ben (1962 − c. 1981), was a male black bear actor best known for playing the leading role of Ben the bear in the 1967–1969 CBS television series, Gentle Ben. He also played the adult Ben in the feature film prelude to the TV series, Gentle Giant (1967). In 1968, Bruno received a first-place PATSY Award for his work on the Gentle Giant film and a second-place award for his work on the TV series. After the Gentle Ben series ended, Bruno made another well-received appearance in the 1972 John Huston-directed film The Life and Times of Judge Roy Bean, starring Paul Newman.

He is not related or otherwise connected to the earlier bear actor also named "Bruno the Bear" who appeared in several Mack Sennett comedies and similar comedy films, such as Her Week-End starring Gale Henry, during the 1910s and 1920s.

== Early life ==
Bruno was acquired by Ralph Helfer's Africa U.S.A. animal ranch sometime before 1965. Africa U.S.A., at that time located in Soledad Canyon near Saugus, California, provided trained animals to Hollywood for film and television work, including many Ivan Tors productions. According to Ken Beck and Jim Clark, Bruno and a brother were orphaned in Wisconsin as cubs, and later acquired by Helfer from a private party. It was reported during the Gentle Ben series run that Bruno (who at that point had been renamed "Ben" for the run of the show) had been "discovered" in White Lake, Wisconsin, and that he was 6 years old in 1968, making his birth year 1962. Ralph Helfer confirmed in 1970 that one of the bears who appeared in Gentle Ben was obtained from Ivan Walters' game farm in White Lake.

Anthony "Tony" Pelky, owner of the Chain Lake Game Farm near Lakewood, Wisconsin, and his son claimed during Pelky's lifetime and in his 1986 obituaries that Pelky was the "man who raised Gentle Ben" from a cub. According to Tony Pelky, "Gentle Ben" and his two brothers were born near Lakewood in 1962. Shortly after their birth, their mother was killed by a hunter and the cubs were adopted and bottle-fed by the hunter's son. A local game warden took the cubs as wards of the state and offered one cub to Pelky. (According to the Milwaukee Journal, the other two cubs were given to a game farm near Langlade, Wisconsin, and eventually appeared on the Ivan Tors-produced TV series Daktari, which was filmed primarily at Africa U.S.A. using its animals.) Pelky said that the cub, which he named "Smokey", was "the tamest bear he ever saw" although the bear had no training. Smokey, who eventually grew to an adult size of 650 pounds, would allow a man to put an arm in his mouth without biting and would back away from a dog rather than fight.

According to the Pelkys, Africa U.S.A. trainers heard about the bear, were impressed by his docile temperament and large size, and purchased him from Pelky for either $500 or $600. The Pelkys said that they later recognized the bear shown in the opening theme sequence of Gentle Ben, which was Bruno, as the bear they had sold. However, Pelky also said that the sale took place in 1968 whereas Bruno was reportedly acquired by Africa U.S.A. in 1962 and was living at the Africa U.S.A. ranch by 1965. A 1967 interview with Gentle Ben actor Dennis Weaver refers to a bear named "Smokey" that "alternate[d] with Bruno as Gentle Ben" in the series.

After Bruno arrived at Africa U.S.A., he was declawed and his teeth were removed, and he was trained for acting work using Helfer's "affection training" system, a method which seeks to establish a bond between animal and trainer by the trainer giving affection and attention, rather than relying on physical punishment or food rewards. Throughout his career, his weight (which may have fluctuated) was reported at different levels between 600 and 800 pounds, and his height has been variously stated as 7, 7 1/2. or just over 8 feet tall.

== Career ==
=== Early career ===
Bruno made his film debut in 1965 in the Ivan Tors/ MGM film Zebra in the Kitchen, about animals set free from a zoo. He also appeared on Tors' hit television series Daktari as a guest star, playing a sick circus bear who escapes into the African bush. An April 1966 article by Cleveland Amory in TV Guide described Bruno as "a 7-foot, 700-pound black bear, perhaps the biggest 'working' bear in the world and yet so gentle children can ride him.'"

Before he became known as the star of Gentle Ben, Bruno narrowly escaped death or serious injury at least twice. On December 29, 1965, record rains caused an 8-foot-deep flash flood at the Africa U.S.A. compound in Soledad Canyon. The vast majority of animals were saved, but Bruno was washed away and could not be found after the floodwaters subsided. The Ivan Tors production unit, via radio and newspapers, asked area residents not to shoot him on sight, and assured the public that he had no teeth and was "harmless and just loves Cokes or fruit." A few days later, Bruno returned to the ranch of his own accord and scratched at his cage to be let back in. He was several pounds lighter and covered with mud, but in good health.

On July 12, 1966, a runaway Southern Pacific locomotive (or according to some accounts, a flatcar carrying a steam-powered crane) suddenly derailed and crushed several cages in the Africa U.S.A. compound, killing a railroad employee. Bruno's cage was demolished, but he was unharmed because his trainers had taken him out of the cage for a walk shortly before the accident occurred.

=== Gentle Ben ===
Bruno rose to fame when he appeared in the leading role of the adult Ben the bear in Tors' 1967 feature film Gentle Giant and the 1967–1969 CBS television series based on the film, Gentle Ben. The film and series concern the adventures of a large male bear named Ben and his human companion Mark Wedloe, a little boy whose father is a wildlife officer in the Florida Everglades. Bruno traveled to Florida to film the series, and had difficulty adjusting to the heat, causing him to lose weight and necessitating trips back to Africa U.S.A. to get him back in shape. Following a January 1969 flood which severely damaged Africa U.S.A., he was permanently relocated to Florida.

Although several bears were used to play the adult Ben depending on the desired behavior for a scene (for example, different bears were used for running, fighting, and swimming), Bruno was the favorite due to his large size, relatively docile temperament, broad range of behaviors, facial expressions, and ability to work well with children. Helfer said that "Bruno did most of his own work," including riding the airboat shown in the series, doing his own "attacks", and "grabbing the bad guy." According to actor Clint Howard, who co-starred as Mark in the film and series, Bruno, along with a bear named Buck that was used for running scenes because Bruno did not like to run, did 75% of the work. Howard, who was a young child between 6 and 10 years old when working with Bruno, said that he never had any trouble working with him except once when Bruno sat on him and had to be gotten off by the trainers.

Bruno was known for his prodigious appetite, with Coca-Cola, fruit and Tootsie Rolls being among his favorite foods. When a script called for him to reject his food, he continued to eat despite being fed large meals beforehand and the crew covering the food used in the scene with cold cream and Chanel No. 5. He also frequently stole cigarettes from the cast and crew and ate them. Helfer said, "We had a game we played during lunch. We would run around [Bruno] in a circle, and he would catch us in his arms, and we would wrestle, which was fun. When he got tired, he would sit on you."

During the 1967–1969 run of the series, Bruno's name in articles and other publicity materials was briefly changed to "Ben" or sometimes "Gentle Ben". After the series ended, his name was changed back to Bruno. (In addition to Bruno, other bears who had appeared in or been involved with the series were also publicly exhibited under the name "Gentle Ben" throughout the late 1960s and 1970s.)

Several trainers were involved with the Gentle Giant film and/or the Gentle Ben TV show, but most of the day-to-day work on the show with Bruno was handled by Monty Cox and Vern Debord. Head trainer Cox lived with Bruno in a Miami apartment in order to give him the necessary affection and attention he needed. According to Cox, Bruno sometimes followed him into the shower and slept in his bed.

=== Post-Gentle Ben career ===
After the Gentle Ben TV series ended in 1969, Bruno moved back to the Soledad Canyon area near Saugus and Acton, California, with trainer Ron Oxley, who had worked as a trainer on Gentle Ben and was now setting up his own business, Action Animals, to provide trained animals for film and TV work. (At that time, Africa U.S.A. had been forced to close and go through a lengthy relocation after suffering extensive damage from two major floods and a fire during early 1969.) Bruno lived with Oxley and a trained lion named Neil (who later lived for a time in a house with actress Tippi Hedren and her family). Bruno and Neil were friendly with each other and Oxley sometimes took both of them to acting job locations, even if only one had a part. After Oxley's death, his obituary mentioned them as his two most prized animals out of many that he had trained.

In November 1972, Bruno received publicity for appearing in an episode of Gunsmoke entitled "Tatum" (Season 18, Episode 10). Due to the desert location, Bruno's scenes had to be shot in the early morning before the ground got too hot for his paws. By this point, Bruno was being credited with over 400 television appearances.

Bruno again made news for his appearance as Watch Bear (aka Zachary Taylor), the bear companion of Judge Roy Bean played by Paul Newman in the 1972 John Huston-directed film The Life and Times of Judge Roy Bean. The bear character was a fictionalized version of a real pet black bear, coincidentally also named "Bruno", that the real-life Judge Roy Bean had kept while serving as a justice of the peace in Langtry, Texas, in the late 1800s. During production, Oxley brought Neil the lion along with Bruno to the filming location, where Neil reportedly urinated on a visiting journalist and caused havoc by wandering into actress Jacqueline Bisset's trailer. Huston "fuss[ed] over" both animals and encouraged Newman to grow a beard for the film in order to blend in with Bruno. Although the movie received mixed reviews, Bruno received good reviews for his performance. Some critics as well as Newman himself opined that Bruno had stolen every scene in which he appeared with Newman.

Other feature films in which Bruno appeared included the family adventure movie The Adventures of the Wilderness Family (1975), the horror film Shadow of the Hawk (1976) starring Jan-Michael Vincent, and the TV movie Guardian of the Wilderness (1976), a biopic of Yosemite National Park protector Galen Clark.

Bruno also continued to make TV appearances, including on the 1973 "Mama" Cass Elliot TV special Don't Call Me Mama Anymore and The Merv Griffin Show. He also made occasional personal appearances with Oxley at circuses and events.

=== Honors and awards ===
In 1968, Bruno won the PATSY Award in the motion picture category for his work in Gentle Giant. He was also nominated in the TV category for the Gentle Ben series, but placed second, losing out to Arnold the Pig from Green Acres.

He was nominated for another PATSY in 1973 for The Life and Times of Judge Roy Bean and again in 1977 for Guardian of the Wilderness, but did not win.

== Death ==
After Ron Oxley's sudden death in 1985, his friend Carol Riggins stated in one of his obituaries that Bruno the bear had died "four or five years ago", which placed Bruno's death in 1980 or 1981 at the age of 18 or 19.

== Filmography (selective) ==
=== Films ===
- Zebra in the Kitchen (1965)
- Gentle Giant (1967)
- The Life and Times of Judge Roy Bean (1972)
- The Adventures of the Wilderness Family (1975)
- Shadow of the Hawk (1976)
- Guardian of the Wilderness (TV movie) (1976)
- The Further Adventures of the Wilderness Family (1978)

=== Television ===
- Daktari, Season 2, Episode 11, "Shoot to Kill" (1966)
- Gentle Ben, main cast (1967–1969)
- Gunsmoke, Season 18, Episode 10, "Tatum" (1972)
- "Mama" Cass Elliot TV Special, Don't Call Me Mama Anymore (1973)
- The Merv Griffin Show, Season 13, Episode 139 (April 2, 1976)

== See also ==
- List of individual bears
