= Yale Summers =

American actor

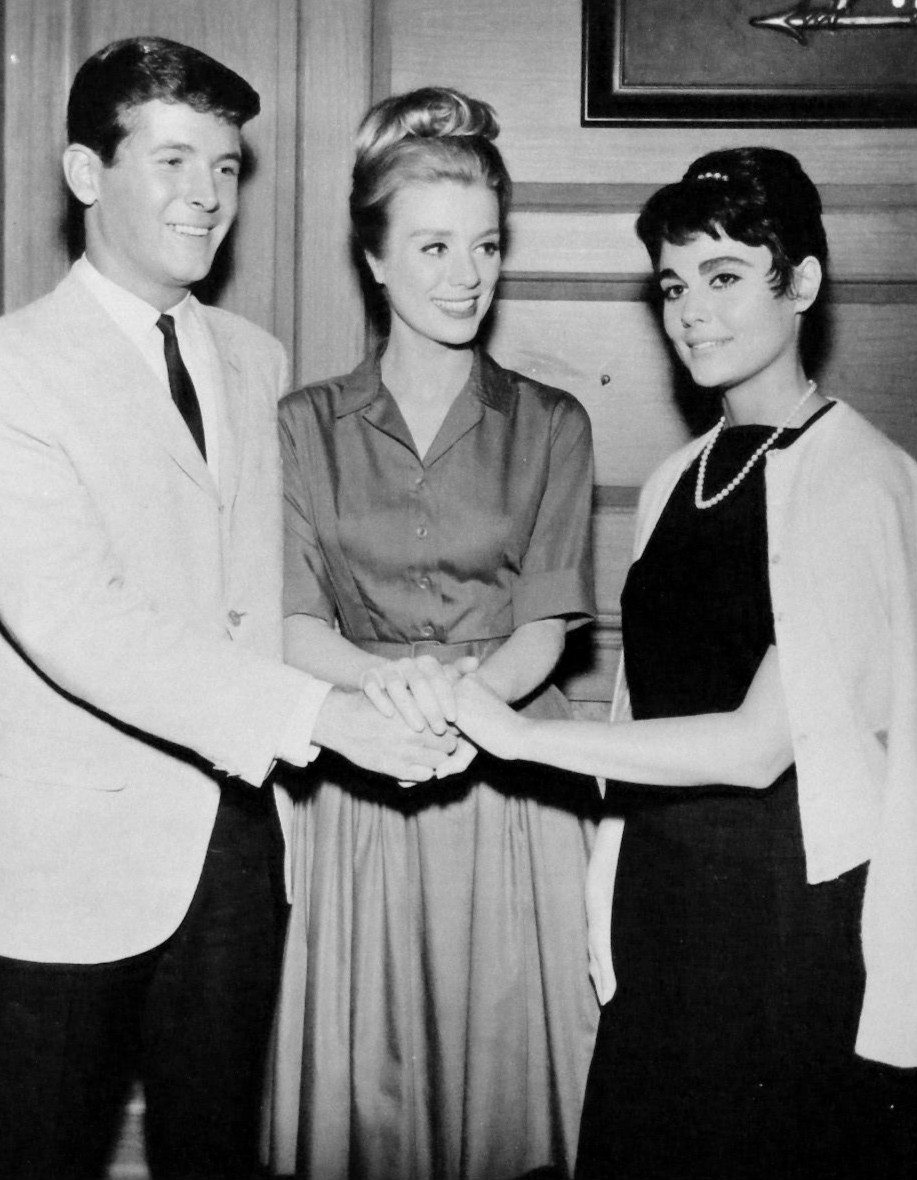
- Yale Summers guest starring with Sharon Hugueny (right) in a May 1964 episode of Inger Stevens' sitcom The Farmer's Daughter
- Born: July 26, 1933; Manhattan, New York, US
- Died: May 6, 2012 (aged 78); Beverly Hills, California, US
- Occupation: Actor
- Years active: 1961–2009
- Spouse: Suzanne Ried Summers
- Children: 2

Yale Summers (July 26, 1933 – May 6, 2012) was an American actor and producer, whose credits included the 1960s CBS television series, Daktari, with Marshall Thompson.

Summers was heavily involved with the Screen Actors Guild. He was a member of the SAG national board of directors for twenty-seven years and the national executive committee for eighteen years.

== Acting career ==
Born in Manhattan, Summers made his acting debut in the 1961 film, Mad Dog Coll, playing a small unbilled role. The remainder of his career was almost entirely occupied with television. He appeared in a recurring role on the ABC soap opera, General Hospital, as Dr. Bob Ayres during the 1964-1965 television season. His best known role was as Jack Dane on Daktari, which aired from 1966 to 1968. From 1972 to 1974, Summers replaced Lawrence Casey in the NBC daytime series, Return to Peyton Place, as the character Rodney Harrington.

His additional television roles included guest spots on Land of the Giants, My Favorite Martian, My Three Sons, The Outer Limits, Quincy, M.E., Fantasy Island, and The Donna Reed Show.

== SAG and AFTRA involvement ==
Summers was a founding member of the SAG Awards Committee and for a time the chairman of that committee. Summers was a co-founder and producer of the Screen Actors Guild Awards from 1995 until 2009.

Summers also served as the former national treasurer and the recording secretary for SAG. Summers was a trustee of the SAG Pension and Health Funds and a member of the board for the SAG Foundation. In 2008, SAG awarded Summers the Ralph Morgan Award for his service and involvement with the union.

Summers was active with another actors' union, the American Federation of Television and Radio Artists. He served a combined twenty-four years on the national AFTRA board and the union's local Los Angeles chapter.

SAG and AFTRA merged in March 2012, shortly before Summers' death.

== Personal life ==
The only child of Joseph and Edlie Neuvohner, Summers received a Bachelor of Business Administration degree from Cornell University in 1955 and served in the United States Army, having attained the rank of lieutenant.

He married actress Suzanne Ried in 1967. They had 2 children, one of whom is Jolie Elean Summers. He also had 2 grandchildren at the time of his death.

== Filmography ==
Films
Year	Title	Role
1961	Mad Dog Coll	Gambler (uncredited)
1977	If You Loved Me	Don
2000	$pent	Max's Father (uncredited)

Television
Year	Title	Role	Notes
1962	The Dick Powell Theater	Jeff	"330 Independence S.W." - Season 1 Episode 25
1962	Window on Main Street	Fred	"It's Blessed to Receive" - Season 1 Episode 27
1962	The Gallant Men	Young Officer (uncredited)	"Some Tears Fall Dry" - Season 1 Episode 8
1962	Cheyenne	Lieutenant Jackson	"Johnny Brassbuttons" - Season 7 Episode 11
1963	The Untouchables	Student (uncredited)	"The Snowball" - Season 4 Episode 15
1963	General Hospital	Dr. Bob Ayres	
1963	The Donna Reed Show	Howard	"The New Look" - Season 5 Episode 19, "Big Wheel" Season 5 Episode 33
1963	Channing	Fraternity President	"Exercise in a Shark Tank" - Season 1 Episode 2
1963	The New Phil Silvers Show	TBC	
1963	The Lieutenant	Lt. Barry Everest	"The Two Star Giant" - Season 1 Episode 4, "A Touching of Hands" - Season 1 Episode 7
1964	My Favorite Martian	Intern	"RX for a Martian" - Season 1 Episode 16
1964	The Outer Limits	Buddy Lyman	"Second Chance" - Season 1 Episode 23
1964	The Farmer's Daughter	Paul Layton	"Mismatch Maker" - Season 1 Episode 35
1964	Karen	Hoot Dubbins	"Surfer's Aide" - Season 1 Episode 2
1964	Twelve O'Clock High	Lt. Charley Vale	"Appointment at Liege" - Season 1 Episode 9
1966-68	Daktari	Jack Dane	
1969	The Bold Ones: The New Doctors	Walter Emmons	"One Small Step for Man" - Season 1 Episode 5
1970	Land of the Giants	Andre	"Nightmare" - Season 2 Episode 16
1971	The Smith Family	Mr. Bower	"Cindy" - Season 1 Episode 1
1971	O'Hara, U.S. Treasury	Freshno Agent	"Operation: Stolen Bonds" - Season 1 Episode 3
1971	McMillan & Wife	George Fairborn	"The Easy Sunday Murder Case" - Season 1 Episode 2
1972	Arnie	Dougie Pritchett	"Room at the Top" - Season 2 Episode 19
1965-72	My Three Sons	Multiple roles	
1972	Return to Peyton Place	Rodney Harrington #2	
1974	Big Rose: Double Trouble	James Mayhew	TV movie
1975	The Blue Knight	Clark	"Two to Make Deadly" - Season 1 Episode 1
1976	Emergency!	Manager	"The Tycoons" - Season 5 Episode 23
1977	Switch	Porter Collins	"Butterfly Mourning" - Season 2 Episode 17
1970-78	This Is the Life	Multiple roles	
1978	The Amazing Captain Nemo	Sirak	TV movie
1978	Fantasy Island	Philip	"I Want to Get Married/The Jewel Thief" - Season 2 Episode 5
1979	Quincy M.E.	Coroner	"Walking Softly Through the Night: Part 1, Part 2" - Season 4 episodes 14, 15
1979	240-Robert	Mr. Kline	"The Apology" - Season 1 Episode 1

== Death ==
Summers died in Beverly Hills, California at the age of 78 from complications of chronic obstructive pulmonary disease.

Actor and former SAG President Ed Asner said, "Yale was a good man and a good friend who was totally dedicated to his belief in the union. He was completely unbiased and never took sides. He had a purist vision of how the guild should be run and wasn't swayed by the influence of special interest groups. He put the best interest of the guild and union first. I'm deeply sorry for his passing."
