= The Life and Times of Judge Roy Bean =

1972 film directed by John Huston

- Theatrical release poster by Richard Amsel
- Directed by: John Huston
- Written by: John Milius
- Produced by: John Foreman
- Starring: Paul Newman; Jacqueline Bisset; Tab Hunter; John Huston; Stacy Keach; Roddy McDowall; Anthony Perkins; Victoria Principal; Anthony Zerbe; Ava Gardner
- Cinematography: Richard Moore
- Edited by: Hugh S. Fowler
- Music by: Maurice Jarre
- Production company: First Artists; Coleytown Productions
- Distributed by: National General Pictures
- Release date: December 18, 1972
- Running time: 120 minutes
- Country: United States
- Language: English
- Budget: $4 million
- Box office: $16,530,578

The Life and Times of Judge Roy Bean is a 1972 American Western comedy-drama film directed by John Huston from a screenplay by John Milius. It is loosely based on the life of Roy Bean, a saloon-keeper and Justice of the Peace in Val Verde County, Texas. It stars Paul Newman in the title role, along with Jacqueline Bisset, Tab Hunter, Stacy Keach, Roddy McDowall, Anthony Perkins, Ava Gardner, Anthony Zerbe, Victoria Principal (in her film debut) and Huston himself.

The film was released by National General Pictures on December 18, 1972, to generally positive reviews and commercial success. The song, "Marmalade, Molasses & Honey", earned Academy Award and Golden Globe nominations for Best Original Song. Victoria Principal's performance earned her a Golden Globe nomination for New Star of the Year – Actress.

== Plot ==
Outlaw Roy Bean rides into the West Texas border town of Vinegaroon by himself. The customers in the saloon beat him, rob him, toss a noose around him, and let his horse drag him off, though he manages to survive.

A young woman from a local Mexican village, Maria Elena, finds and helps him. Bean promptly returns to town and shoots all those who wronged him. With no law and order, he appoints himself judge and "the law west of the Pecos", becoming the townspeople's patron. A traveling preacher, LaSalle, buries the dead.

Bean renames the saloon The Jersey Lilly, and hangs a portrait of Lillie Langtry, a noted actress and singer of the 1890s, whom he has never met but idolizes. Maria Elena is given a place to live and fine clothes ordered from a Sears Roebuck catalog. When a band of thieves comes to town (Big Bart Jackson and gang members Nick the Grub, Fermel Parlee, Tector Crites, and Whorehouse Lucky Jim), rather than oppose them, Bean swears them in as lawmen. The new marshals round up other outlaws, then claim their goods after Bean sentences them to hang. Prostitutes are sentenced to remain in town and keep the marshals company.

Dispensing his own kind of frontier justice, Bean lets the marshals hang a murderer named Sam Dodd, and share his money. When a drunkard shoots up a saloon, Bean does not mind, but when Lillie's portrait is struck by a bullet, he shoots him dead immediately. Finding money in the corpse's pockets, he fines the drunkard for discharging a firearm in a public place and pockets the money.

As time passes, new buildings are constructed in Bean's name, more citizens settle in, and eccentric visitors arrive. A mountain man called Grizzly Adams gives Bean a bear (named Zachary Taylor after the 12th president of the United States, but later renamed the Watch Bear) as a pet. Later, notorious albino outlaw Bad Bob comes to town and challenges Bean to a showdown. As Bob approaches the saloon, expecting Bean to emerge, Bean snipes him in the back from the upper floor of a barn. When a lawyer named Frank Gass shows up claiming the saloon is rightfully his, Bean puts him in a cage with the bear but eventually concedes to let him set up his own legal practice after the citizens get the bear hooked on beer. One evening, a drunken bear pursues a man through the saloon, leading to both of their deaths.

Bean goes to San Antonio, Texas alone to see Jersey Lilly, leaving a pregnant Maria Elena behind and promising her a music box that plays "The Yellow Rose of Texas". In his absence, Gass and the prostitutes conspire to seize control of the town from the judge's hard rule. A dapper Bean tries to see Lillie Langtry's show, but it is sold out. He is deceived by men who knock him cold and steal his money.

Upon his return, Bean finds that Maria Elena is dying following a difficult childbirth. He names the baby Rose after the music box's song. He also plans to hang the doctor, but Gass, who has been elected mayor, overrules him. Bean is sorrowful about losing Maria Elena and rides away. Gass brings in hired guns to get rid of Bean's marshals.

Years later, during World War I (though references to Prohibition in the United States are also made), Gass has erected oil rigs around the prospering town. Automobiles are seen everywhere, and violent gangs run rampant, with conflicts often settled by Gass's mercenaries. A grown Rose and an elder Crites, who raised Rose as his daughter, are surprised one day to find Bean has returned. When an angry mob attempts to torch the saloon on Gass's orders, Bean catches the torch and throws it into an oil rig, causing a chain of fiery explosions and a mass shootout that kills many of Gass's men, while civilians flee. Bean, on horseback, chases Gass into a burning building, declaring "For Texas, and Miss Lilly!".

Some time later, Lillie Langtry arrives by train. Crites, now one of only two men left in town and the caretaker of the saloon, itself converted into a museum, tells her the story of Bean and his feelings toward her, noting that Bean successfully shot Gass dead and fined him before the townspeople hung his corpse. Later, Bean died peacefully, while Rose married a fighter pilot. Langtry remains fascinated by Bean's character as she reads a letter he wrote for her towards the end of his life.

== Cast ==
- Paul Newman as Roy Bean
- Jacqueline Bisset as Rose Bean
- Tab Hunter as Sam Dodd
- John Huston as Grizzly Adams
- Stacy Keach as Bad Bob
- Roddy McDowall as Frank Gass
- Anthony Perkins as Reverend LaSalle
- Anthony Zerbe as Hustler
- Ava Gardner as Lillie Langtry
- Victoria Principal as Maria Elena
- Ned Beatty as Tector Crites
- Jim Burk as Big Bart Jackson
- Matt Clark as Nick the Grub
- Billy Pearson as the Stationmaster
- Bill McKinney as Fermel Parlee
- Steve Kanaly as Whorehouse Lucky Jim
- Michael Sarrazin as Rose's husband
- Mark Headley as Billy the Kid
- Jack Colvin as a pimp
- Howard Morton as the photographist
- Don Starr as the opera house manager
- Stan Barrett as a shootist
- Jeannie Epper as a prostitute
- Richard Farnsworth, Roy Jenson, and Fred Krone as outlaws

== Production ==
=== Writing ===
The film was based on an original script by John Milius, who hoped to direct with Warren Oates in the lead as Roy Bean. "I wanted to make it very cheap," he said. "Shoot in Spain. In some crummy little town, a Sergio Leone leftover and have Warren be the Judge." The script was sent to Lee Marvin who was making Pocket Money with Paul Newman; Newman read the script and became enthusiastic about starring. The producers were not keen on Milius directing and paid a record price to own the script outright – $300,000. Milius later said he liked John Huston but thought that he completely ruined the movie. He was angry at the casting of "cutesy-pie" Paul Newman and felt Warren Oates would have been more suitable.

Milius later elaborated:

Judge Roy Bean has been turned into a Beverly Hills western. Roy Bean is an obsessed man. He's like Lawrence of Arabia. He sits out there in the desert and he's got this great vision of law and order and civilization and he kills people and does anything in the name of progress. I love those kind of people! That's the kind of people who built this country! That's the American spirit! And they say, 'What you've created is a reprehensible man. We've got to make him much more cute.' So they changed it from a Western about royalty and greed and power to a western where Andy Williams sings a song in the middle of the movie and the judge and his girl and a pet bear go off on a picnic. It's incredible. He goes on a picnic and sits on a teeter-totter. It's a movie about Beverly Hills people. About John Foreman and John Huston and Paul Newman.

Milius also said Huston "would explain what he was doing to me all the time. We had a strange relationship. He tortured me constantly, changing things and doing scenes, I thought, deliberately wrong. At the same time, he would explain his options and why he made the decision he made, right or wrong; or the different ways he could have done it. I watched the way an atmosphere was created on the set, watched the way he would respond to an actor resisting him and the way he dealt with an actor going along with him too easily. How he would deal with bad actors. I remember one time when he had someone he said was the worst he'd ever had, and I asked him, what do you do? And he said ‘Not a damn thing, I have no idea.’ He just went back to his trailer." Milius said there "was a terrific amount of humor in the original screenplay. More humor than was in this one (the movie). But it still had a feel that was closer to say a Sergio Leone movie... The Good, the Bad and the Ugly would probably be a good example." Milius claimed the experience prompted him to go into directing "out of self defence and a desire to control".

=== Casting ===
"My God is Paul Newman a good actor," said John Huston. "He's just marvelous in this picture. He's never done anything quite like this and yet he's caught something unique and original. The picture definitely says something about a spirit of the past. There's something uniquely American about the judge."

Watch Bear was played by Bruno, an American black bear that had played the lead in the 1967–1969 TV series Gentle Ben. Paul Newman thought that Bruno stole every scene in which they appeared together, an opinion shared by some reviewers.

=== Filming ===
Filming took place at various locations in Arizona, and at Old Tucson Studios.

During shooting, Anthony Perkins had an affair with Victoria Principal, who was making her film debut. He later married Berry Berenson. "I think we've got a hell of a picture," said John Huston. "I think it will be very popular. Of course I've been wrong before, but there's a grand sort of thing about it. The wind blows through it. The story is a complete departure from reality, a pure fantasy." The film was budgeted at $3 million, but costs increased due to insertion of a final sequence not in the original script and extensive post-production editing.

== Reception ==
=== Box office ===
The film earned estimated North American rentals of $7 million in 1973.

=== Critical response ===
Roger Ebert gave the film two-and-a-half stars out of four and wrote that it "doesn't have much flow and keeps stopping and starting." Vincent Canby of The New York Times called the film "so entertaining and so vigorously performed, especially by Newman in the title role, that its pretensions become part of its robust, knock-about style." Variety wrote "The two-hour running time is not fleshed out with anything more than scenic vignettes, sometime attempting to recreate the success of Butch Cassidy and the Sundance Kid, with an Alan and Marilyn Bergman-lyricked tune and Maurice Jarre's music, sometimes attempting honest spoofing of western, and sometimes trying to play the story historically straight. The overkill and the undertone do it in." Gene Siskel of the Chicago Tribune gave the film two stars out of four and wrote "Not the 'bawdy' gags, nor the 'Marmalade, Molasses and Honey' musical interlude sung by Andy Williams, can hide the essential flaw in Roy Bean: He is a blind, egotistical jerk who gets off by hanging people." Kevin Thomas of the Los Angeles Times wrote, "Arguably overlong, arguably self-indulgent on occasion, The Life and Times of Judge Roy Bean is nonetheless happily as intent upon being fun as it is in being significant. As Bean, Newman may not seem quite dumb enough but is genuinely moving and has great authority. Surely his performance here is a high point in a notable career." Gary Arnold of The Washington Post declared the film "a big name bummer. I spent the better part of an exceedingly slow two hours fighting recurrent attacks of drowsiness...The episodic structure is undermined by too many episodes that depend on crude jokes, dumb wheezes and gratuitous killing. As the scenes and the would-be 'colorful' characters flop and repeat themselves, one's interest begins to evaporate." Clyde Jeavons of The Monthly Film Bulletin wrote "Now and again, thanks to the choice of an episodic style and the use of an engaging crop of guest stars in cameo roles, there are glimpses of what might have been; moments when the film looks as if it might take off like Butch Cassidy or say something meaningful like Little Big Man...But these are small oases in a large desert, and no matter how dismissive John Huston may choose to be about his film, it has the air of an elaborate mistake—overblown, tedious and over-emphatic."

The film holds a score of 80% on Rotten Tomatoes, based on 10 reviews.

=== Awards and nominations ===
Award	Category	Nominee	Result	Ref.
Academy Awards	Best Song – Original for the Picture	"Marmalade, Molasses & Honey"; Music by Maurice Jarre; Lyrics by Alan and Marilyn Bergman	Nominated	
Golden Globe Awards	Best Original Song – Motion Picture	"Marmalade, Molasses & Honey"; Music by Maurice Jarre; Lyrics by Alan and Marilyn Bergman	Nominated	
Golden Globe Awards	Most Promising Newcomer – Female	Victoria Principal	Nominated	

== In popular culture ==
The music cue from the film, entitled "Miss Lily Langtry" and composed by Maurice Jarre, appears in the 2019 movie Once Upon a Time in Hollywood, written and directed by Quentin Tarantino and is included on the film's soundtrack.

== See also ==
- List of American films of 1972
