= Kävik the Wolf Dog =

1968 novel written by Walt Morey

- First edition book cover
- Author: Walt Morey
- Publisher: Dutton Juvenile
- Publication date: August 26, 1968
- Awards: Dutton Animal Book Award (1968); Vermont Golden Dome Book Award (1970); William Allen White Children's Book Award (1971)
- ISBN: 9780525330936

Kävik the Wolf Dog is a 1968 novel written by Walt Morey. It won the 1968 Dutton Animal Book Award as a draft, resulting in its subsequent publication. It also received the 1970 Vermont Golden Dome Book Award and 1971 William Allen White Children's Book Award.

== Made-for-TV movie ==
A made-for-TV movie called The Courage of Kavik the Wolf Dog based on the book aired under the Sunday Big Event umbrella on NBC in 1979.

== Plot ==
Kävik, an Alaskan Malamute sled dog, gets sold by Charlie One-eye to Mr. Hunter for $2,000 after winning the North American Sled-dog race and is loaded on a plane in an iron-barred cage. In the middle of the trip, the plane crashes, killing pilot Smiley Johnson.

Kävik's cage makes a gaping hole in the side of the plane when it crashes. After being trapped in the cage for three days while starving, freezing, and getting multiple wounds from neighboring animals, Kävik is found by Andy Evans, a teenage boy whose trapline was the location of the wreck.

Andy uses his belt axe to open the cage and uses a piece of the plane's wing to create a sled to carry the injured dog until they reach a cave, where they spend the night. The next morning, Andy is shaken awake by his father, Kurt Evans, and they take Kävik back to their house. Laura Evans, Andy's mother, suggests that they have him treated by Dr. Walker.

When Dr. Walker arrives, he is led to believe by Andy that Laura was sick, but he learns that Kävik was injured instead and refuses to operate on him because he is a people doctor, not a veterinarian. But with Laura's tricky ways, he is persuaded to help Kavik.

Over the period of a few weeks, Kävik almost fully recovers. One day, while Andy is at his job downtown, Kävik escapes to town and gets chased by a pack of dogs led by Blackie. It turns out he has lost his fighting courage due to the plane wreck.

A few weeks later, Andy comes home and notices that Kävik is nowhere to be found. His dad tells Andy that Mr. Hunter came by earlier that day and took Kävik back to his home in Washington, despite being told by Andy's father that Kävik is a coward and has lost his wolflike courage.

When Mr. Hunter goes to show Kävik off, Kävik escapes out of a window and sets out over 2,000 miles to return to Andy, the only person who ever loved him enough to take care of him. While traveling, he finds a mate who is later killed. The return journey comprises most of the second half of the novel.

== See also ==
- Gentle Ben

Awards
Preceded by From the Mixed-Up Files of Mrs. Basil E. Frankweiler	Winner of the William Allen White Children's Book Award; 1971	Succeeded by Sasha: My Friend
