= The Fox and the Hound (novel) =

1967 novel by Daniel P. Mannix

- Cover of the first edition of The Fox and the Hound.
- Author: Daniel P. Mannix
- Illustrator: John Schoenherr
- Language: English
- Genre: Novel
- Published: September 11, 1967
- Publisher: E. P. Dutton
- Publication place: United States, Canada
- Media type: Print (hardcover)
- Pages: 255 pp (first edition)
- OCLC: 2047816

The Fox and the Hound is a 1967 novel written by American novelist Daniel P. Mannix and illustrated by John Schoenherr. It follows the lives of Tod, a red fox raised by a human for the first year of his life, and Copper, a half-bloodhound dog owned by a local hunter, referred to as the Master. After Tod causes the death of the man's favorite hound, man and dog relentlessly hunt the fox, against the dual backdrops of a changing human world and Tod's normal life in hunting for food, seeking a mate, and defending his territory. As preparation for writing the novel, Mannix studied foxes, both tame and wild, a wide variety of hunting techniques, and the ways hounds appear to track foxes, seeking to ensure his characters acted realistically.

The novel won the Dutton Animal Book Award in 1967, which resulted in its publication on September 11 that year by E. P. Dutton. It was a 1967 Reader's Digest Book Club selection and a winner of the Athenaeum Literary Award. It was well received by critics, who praised its detail and Mannix's writing style. Walt Disney Productions purchased the film rights for the novel when it won the Dutton award, though did not begin production on an adaptation until 1977. Heavily modified from the source material, Disney's animated film The Fox and the Hound was released to theaters in July 1981 and became a financial success.

== Plot ==
Copper, a bloodhound crossbred, was once the favorite among his Master's pack of hunting dogs in a rural country area. However, he now feels threatened by Chief, a younger, faster Black and Tan Coonhound. Copper hates Chief, who is taking Copper's place as pack leader. During a bear hunt, Chief protects the Master when the bear turns on him, while Copper is too afraid of the bear to confront him. The Master ignores Copper to heap praise on Chief and Copper's hatred and jealousy grow.

Tod is a red fox kit, raised as a pet by one of the human hunters who killed his mother and litter mates. Tod initially enjoys his life, but when he reaches sexual maturity he returns to the wild. During his first year, he begins establishing his territory, and learns evasion techniques from being hunted by local farm dogs. One day, he comes across the Master's house and discovers that his presence sends the chained pack of dogs into a frustrated frenzy. He begins to delight in taunting them, until one day when Chief breaks his chain and chases him. The Master sees the dog escape and follows with Copper. As Chief skillfully trails the fox, Tod flees along a railroad track while a train is approaching, waiting to jump to safety until the last minute. Chief is killed by the train.

With Chief buried and Master crying over a dead dog he trains Copper to ignore all foxes except for Tod. Over the span of the two animals' lives, man and dog hunt the fox, the Master using over a dozen hunting techniques in his quest for revenge. With each hunt, both dog and fox learn new tricks and methods to outsmart each other, Tod always escaping in the end. Tod mates with an older, experienced vixen who gives birth to a litter of kits. Before they are grown, the Master finds the den and gasses the kits to death. That winter, the Master sets out leg hold traps, which Tod carefully learns how to spring, but the vixen is caught and killed. In January, Tod takes a new mate, with whom he has another litter of kits. The Master uses a "still hunting" technique, in which he sits very quietly in the wood while playing a rabbit call to draw out the foxes. With this method, he kills the kits; then by using the sound of a wounded fox kit, he is also able to draw out and kill Tod's mate.

As the years pass, the rural area gives way to a more urbanized setting. New buildings and highways spring up, more housing developments are built, and the farmers are pushed out. Though much of the wildlife has left and hunting grows increasingly difficult, Tod stays because it is his home range. The other foxes that remain become unhealthy scavengers, and their natures change—life-bonds with their mates are replaced by promiscuity, couples going their separate ways once the mating act is over. The Master has lost most of his own land, and the only dog he owns now is Copper. Each winter they still hunt Tod, and in an odd way he looks forward to it as the only aspect of his old life that remains.

The Master spends most of his time drinking alcohol, and people begin trying to convince him to move into a nursing home, where no dogs are allowed. One summer, an outbreak of rabies spreads through the fox population. After one infected fox attacks a group of human children, the same people approach the Master and ask his help in killing the foxes. He uses traps and poison to try to kill as many foxes as possible; however, the poison also kills domestic animals. After a human child dies from eating it, the humans remove all of the poison, then the Master organizes a hunt in which large numbers of people line up and walk straight into the woods, flushing out foxes to be shot. The aging Tod escapes all three events, as well as an attempt at coursing him with greyhounds.

One morning, after Tod's escape from the greyhounds, the Master sends Copper on the hunt. After he picks up the fox's trail, Copper relentlessly pursues him throughout the day and into the next morning. Tod finally drops dead of exhaustion, and Copper collapses on top of him, close to death himself. The Master nurses Copper back to health, and both enjoy their new popularity, but after a few months the excitement over Copper's accomplishment dies down. The Master is left alone again, and returns to drinking. He is once again asked to consider living in a nursing home, and this time he agrees. Crying, he takes his shotgun from the wall, leads Copper outside, and pets him gently before ordering him to lie down. He covers the dog's eyes as Copper licks his hand trustingly.

== Development ==
Desiring a realistic depiction of vulpine behavior and habits, Mannix spent more than a year studying the behaviors of a mated pair of foxes that he kept at his home. He stated that they were "so tame [that he] could turn them loose and watch them hunt, fight, make love, and live an almost normal life." Additionally, he studied wild foxes and interviewed trappers, hunters, game wardens, and "Masters of Hounds" to learn what they felt foxes would and would not do. In the novel's postscript, Mannix discusses this research. To defend his novel against charges of improbability, he recounts his observations of wild foxes and discusses other people's stories about fox behavior. Regarding the actions Tod takes in eluding the hunters, he details both witnessing wild foxes performing such acts and stories others shared with him that he used as a basis for some of the story's events. For example, he notes that while people have told him that foxes do not really run among sheep or cattle herds to escape hounds, he himself used to watch them do just that from his bedroom window. In the case of a fox running along train tracks as a train is approaching, Mannix drew on a story told to him by a master of hunting in the area of Whitford Sales—near Thorndale, Pennsylvania—who had to stop hunting in the area because of a fox who consistently killed pursuing hounds on the Trenton Cutoff using this method.

Mannix felt it was nearly impossible for any writer to escape imparting some anthropomorphism in such a novel, as a human must guess at the way an animal's mind may work and what motivations it may have. He felt animals think differently from humans, though are capable of reason on a "rudimentary level compared to a human." In explaining his descriptions of hunting, he said it was hard to decide how a hound with non-human scenting ability interprets and responds to scents while tracking another animal.

The last chapter of the novel, covering Copper's last hunt of Tod, was based on the story of Boston, a fourteen-month-old bloodhound–foxhound mix, and Old Baldy, a red fox known by hunters for having outrun numerous packs of hounds put on his trail. Mannix originally read the story in a Recreation magazine article, which stated that in December 1887, near the James River in Virginia, Boston hunted a fox referred to as Baldy for a day and a half, covering 50 miles (80 km) of terrain. According to Mannix, Boston and Baldy died together, and were buried together once found. In the Recreation article, although Boston survived he never fully recovered and died when he was only three years old. Copper himself was based on the favorite hunting dog of Bee Dee Adkins, a nationally renowned trainer of hunting dogs with whom Mannix hunted. Some of the novel's human characters were based on the lives and mannerisms on locals living in Oro Valley, a suburb of Tucson, Arizona.

In 1967, E. P. Dutton selected Mannix's unpublished novel as the 1967 winner of its annual "Animal Book Award"—an international competition open to new authors in which an editorial panel evaluates submissions to find the "best book-length work of adult fiction or nonfiction on animals". Along with a cash prize of $10,000, the company obtained the publication rights for the novel, releasing it in hardback form on September 11 that year. The novel was published in the United States by Dutton and in Canada by Clarke, Irwin and Company, simultaneously. A reprint by Pocket Books followed in 1971. The novel has been released in twelve other countries, including Finland in 1968 by Otava, and in Germany by Hoffmann und Campe.

== Reception ==
The Fox and the Hound was selected as a Reader's Digest Book Club selection in 1967 and an abridged version was printed in the fourth volume of the publisher's Condensed Books series. The same year, it was awarded the Athenaeum Literary Award.

The Booklist called the novel one of "the highest level of books about animals" and praised its combination of "brilliant psychology, writing of rare beauty, and little-known hunting and animal lore". According to the Booklist, Publishers Weekly gave the novel its "highest recommendation" and referred to it as a "marvelous evocation of the animal world". Reviewing the novel for Best Sellers magazine, William B. Hill considered it a "corking good novel", praising it for its "simplicity and straightforwardness" with the dog and fox being "real" rather than allegories for social issues. While he felt the novel was overly detailed in a few places, as a whole he considered the story "credible, almost all fascinating" and the characters entertaining.

Robert Ramsey of the Placerville, California, Mountain Democrat thought the book worthy of winning the Dutton award, characterizing the narrative as "always interesting" and principal characters Tod and Copper as "unforgettable", while praising Mannix's "ability to enter into the world of animals and portray it". A reviewer for the Catholic Library World considered it a "memorable and delightful reading experience" written by a man "who knows the ways of foxes". Author and sportsman Richard Alden Knight praised the novel, stating that it "surpasses any writing I have ever encountered on the thinking processes of animals" and that the story of a duel between natural enemies is "told well and written with feeling". A reviewer for the Reading Eagle felt Mannix wrote well enough to make a reader feel like they were the characters Tod and Copper and that the story was "really exciting" due to the "dramatic opposition" of the two animals.

== Film adaptation ==
Walt Disney Productions purchased the film rights to The Fox and the Hound when it was awarded the Dutton Animal Book Award. Production on a film adaptation began in 1977 and it would become the most expensive animated film produced at the time, at a cost of $12 million. To craft the film, then Disney CEO Ron Miller decided to mainly use new talent to make their debuts with the film, as the pioneers of the company, referred to as the "Nine Old Men", were nearing retirement. The animators and screenplay writers were primarily new, as were the film directors Art Stevens, Ted Berman, and Richard Rich. It would be the last film Ollie Johnston, Frank Thomas, and Woolie Reitherman, considered "legends" of Disney, would work on. However, the transition between the old guard and the new resulted in arguments over how to handle the film. Reitherman had his own ideas on the designs and layouts that should be used; however, the newer team backed Stevens, except Don Bluth, who felt Disney's work was stale. Bluth walked out, taking eleven others with him, and formed his own animation studio. The exodus of the animators forced the cancellation of the film's original Christmas 1980 premiere while new artists were hired.

Along the way, the story was greatly modified to make it more suitable as a family film. By the time it was completed in 1981, the film had changed into a chronicle of the unlikely friendship of two creatures, who should be natural enemies and who learn society sometimes tries to determine their roles despite their better impulses. In the original screenplay, Chief was slated to die the same as in the novel, but Stevens did not want to have an on-screen death and modified the film so that he survived.

The film premiered theatrically in the United States on July 10, 1981. It was an immediate success, grossing $39,900,000 to become the 14th top film of the year. It was subsequently re-released theatrically on March 25, 1988, and saw its first home video release on March 1, 1994.

== See also ==
- Foxes in popular culture, films and literature
