= Jack T. Collis =

American art director

- Born: January 12, 1923; Los Angeles, California
- Died: February 1, 1998 (aged 75); Encino, California
- Occupation: Art director
- Years active: 1953-1992

Jack T. Collis (January 12, 1923 – February 1, 1998) was an American art director. He was nominated for an Academy Award in the category Best Art Direction for the film The Last Tycoon. After studying architecture at the University of Southern California, he began his career as a set decorator at Metro-Goldwyn-Mayer.

== Selected filmography ==
- The Secret of the Pond (1975)
- The Last Tycoon (1976)
- The Million Dollar Dixie Deliverance (1978)
