= Gentle Ben =

Bear character featured in American television series

Dust jacket of the original 1965 E.P. Dutton edition of Gentle Ben by Walt Morey

Gentle Ben is a bear character created by author Walt Morey and first introduced in a 1965 children's novel, Gentle Ben. The original novel told the story of the friendship between a large male bear named Ben and a boy named Mark. The story provided the basis for the 1967 film Gentle Giant, the popular late 1960s U.S. television series Gentle Ben, a 1980s animated cartoon and two early 2000s made-for-TV movies.

== 1965 children's novel Gentle Ben ==
Walt Morey, a filbert farmer and former boxer, had previously written many pulp fiction stories for adults dealing with subjects such as boxing, the Old West, and outdoor adventures, published in magazines such as Argosy. However, due to the decline in demand for pulp fiction caused by the advent of broadcast television in the 1950s, Morey stopped writing for ten years. His wife, a schoolteacher, challenged him to write adventure stories that would interest young readers, similar to those of Jack London. After several years, Morey took up her challenge with the goal of producing an adventure story for young readers that adults could also enjoy.

The result was Gentle Ben, which was based on Morey's own past experiences working and traveling in Alaska. Morey said that many of the book characters were based on real Alaskan people he had met. According to Morey, the concept of a boy's friendship with an Alaskan brown bear was also taken from real life, and such friendships and interactions between humans and bears were not unusual in Alaska.

Originally published in 1965 by E.P. Dutton, the novel was a success, selling nearly 3 million copies. As an unpublished draft it won the Dutton Animal Book Award resulting in its publication. Morey won the Dutton prize a second time in 1968 for Kävik the Wolf Dog. Morey went on to write many more children's novels, often involving themes of nature, animals and survival, but is best known for Gentle Ben.

=== Synopsis of the novel ===
Mark Andersen is a young teenage boy who lives in Alaska with his fisherman father and mother, Karl and Ellen Andersen. Mark is lonely after the death of his older brother, and befriends an Alaskan brown bear named Ben that was captured as a cub by local drunkard Fog Benson. Ben, now a large adult bear, spends his days chained alone in a shack on Benson's property, and the lonely bear bonds with the lonely boy who secretly visits him. Mark's parents are initially upset that he visits Ben, but eventually see that Mark and Ben have a special friendship and buy Ben from Fog Benson for Mark, on the condition that Mark help his father with the fishing to pay him back.

However, Fog Benson and his friends attack Ben and Ben fights back, injuring Fog. The townspeople, who generally regard brown bears as wild and unpredictable, now think that Ben is dangerous, and Mark is forced to abandon Ben on an island, where Ben is still menaced by Fog Benson and hunters. Soon afterwards, Karl's fishing boat is destroyed in a storm, so he takes a job minding a fish trap on the island where Ben is living, which leads to Mark and Ben's renewing their friendship. Then Ben helps a wealthy businessman and trophy hunter visiting the island, Peter King, who is trapped under a rock. Ben gently rolls the rock off him. The grateful King pays a local guide to protect Ben and ends up going into business with Karl Andersen, so Ben will be safe and the Andersens' financial fortunes are greatly improved.

=== Memorial statue ===
An 8 ft (2.4 m) tall (life size) carved wooden statue of Gentle Ben the bear stands in Walt Morey Park in Wilsonville, Oregon, a bear-themed park created on land that previously belonged to the Morey family. In 2012, the Gentle Ben statue was stolen from the park by local teens and dumped in a roadside ditch. It was later found and returned to the park.

== 1960s television series Gentle Ben ==
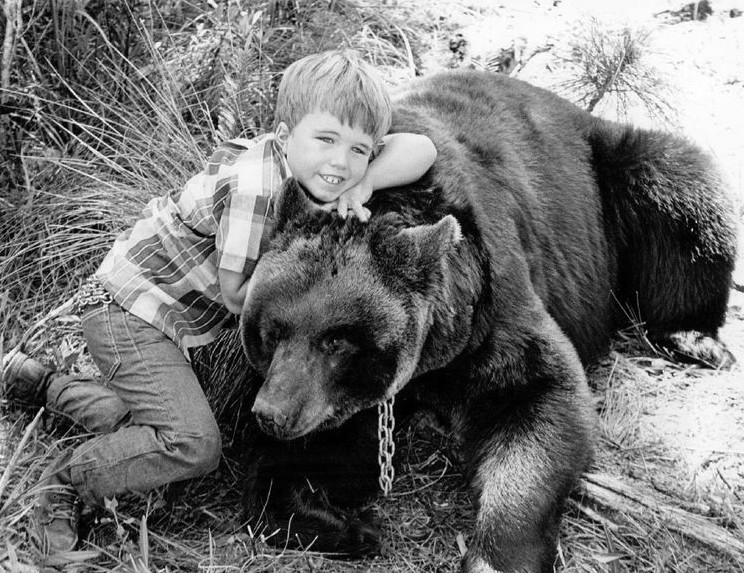
Clint Howard as "Mark Wedloe" with Bruno the Bear as "Ben" in 1967

The CBS television series Gentle Ben premiered September 10, 1967, and ran until August 31, 1969, airing a total of 58 episodes in two seasons. The series chronicled the adventures of young Mark Wedloe (played by Clint Howard) and his lovable 650-to-750 lb (290-to-340 kg) black bear named Ben.

Gentle Ben was produced by Ivan Tors, who also produced the Gentle Giant pilot film. Tors was an established producer of successful TV series, including Sea Hunt, Flipper and Daktari. Like the Gentle Giant film, the TV series Gentle Ben was set in Florida (allowing Tors to use his own studio facilities there) rather than Alaska, and Ben was a large black bear instead of the brown bear of the original novel. The TV series picked up the story where Gentle Giant left off, with Mark's father Tom Wedloe already a wildlife officer in the Everglades, and Ben an adult bear and established family pet living outside (or sometimes inside) the Wedloes' house.

=== Cast of the TV series ===
The TV series had few regular characters, consisting of the Wedloe family and their friend and neighbor Henry Boomhauer. Clint Howard and Dennis Weaver continued their roles from the Gentle Giant film. The role of Ellen Wedloe, played in Gentle Giant by Vera Miles, was recast for the TV series with Beth Brickell. The Boomhauer character appeared in several of the episodes and was played by Clint's real-life father Rance Howard (who also wrote episodes for the show).

Although several black bears were used to play Ben, depending on what behavior was required for a particular scene, the role was played primarily by Bruno the Bear (who also played adult Ben in the Gentle Giant film).

Musician and voice actor Candy Candido provided the voice of Ben. Although the network wanted to have Ben speak like a human on the show, Tors disliked the idea, so Ben made only animal noises.

Notable guest stars included Burt Reynolds, Jay Silverheels, Strother Martin, Slim Pickens, Victor French, and Clint Howard's brother Ron Howard.

=== Bears in the TV series ===
Ralph Helfer's Africa U.S.A. animal ranch provided Bruno and other bears (as well as other animals) used in the series. The bears were obtained from Canada or near the Canada–U.S. border because those bears' coats were thicker and more photogenic than those of bears located further south in the U.S. The bears were declawed and had most of their teeth removed. Helfer stated that four bears were used to portray Ben, with other sources naming or listing additional bears, who may have been used in particular scenes or as stand-in bears. Some episodes and sequences also involved bear cubs or other bear characters that may have required additional bears.

Bruno was the favorite bear actor because of his good disposition, broad range of behaviors, facial expressions, and ability to work with children. A bear named Buck, who closely resembled Bruno but was a slightly smaller, younger and more agile bear, was used for scenes requiring the bear to run. According to Clint Howard, Bruno the bear and Buck the bear together did approximately 75 percent of the bear acting work.

A bear named Drum frequently appeared in scenes requiring the bear to enter water. Drum's coat was brown and had to be spray-painted to match the black coats of the other bears playing Ben. In the 1980s, Dennis Weaver recalled that a bear named Hammer, who occasionally misbehaved on the set, was used for bear scenes involving water. Other bears reportedly used included Smokey, Oscar, Baron, Tudor, Virgil, and a bear (identity unknown, possibly Hammer) with a tendency to fight who was used for bear fight scenes. Bear trainer Tuffy Truesdell, who owned nine bears including the elder and younger Victor the Wrestling Bear, also claimed that his bears did "most of the stand-in work" for the TV series.

According to most sources, the primary bear trainers and bear handlers who did most of the day-to-day bear work on the series were head bear trainer Monty Cox (who said that he was hired after "Ben" had "chewed up" a previous bear trainer), and Vern Debord. Other animal trainers involved in the series included Ron Oxley and Steve Martin. Derrick Rosaire Sr. and Pat Derby have also claimed involvement, although it is not clear whether they worked on the TV series or just on the Gentle Giant pilot film. Bruno and some of the other bears were trained using "affection training", which stressed establishing a respectful bond between animal and trainer, rather than using punishment or food rewards. However, food rewards were used to motivate at least one bear who responded better to that method. Bruno reportedly lived with Cox in a Miami apartment, sometimes even following him into the shower and sleeping in his bed.

During and after the run of the TV series, the name "Ben" or "Gentle Ben" was used to refer to a number of bears who had appeared in the show. Bruno's name was changed to "Ben" while he was appearing in the series; it was changed back to "Bruno" after the show ended. Oxley and Martin made personal appearances at fairs and events with a bear (often Drum) billed as "Gentle Ben." In the late 1960s and 1970s, Rosaire Sr. appeared with the Emmett Kelly Circus and elsewhere with a trained bear he called "Gentle Ben" that purportedly played the role. Rosaire Sr., his son and grandson have said over the years that this bear was a female bear who played both Ben's mother and Ben in the Gentle Giant film. (Ben's mother never appears in the TV series as she is killed at the beginning of the film, and the TV series takes place after the events of the film.)

Tuffy Truesdell also trained a wrestling brown bear known as "Gentleman Ben" and occasionally called "Gentle Ben" or "Ben", who wrestled in at least 80 matches for various promotions in the late 1960s and 1970s. Although Truesdell claimed that his bears did work on the TV series, there is no evidence linking the particular bear he called "Gentleman Ben" to the TV show, particularly since the show used black bears rather than brown bears.

After the Gentle Ben series ended, Bruno moved back to California with trainer Ron Oxley and continued his acting career, making a well-received appearance in the 1972 film The Life and Times of Judge Roy Bean with Paul Newman. Bruno reportedly died in 1980 or 1981. Buck entertained visitors for many years at the Homosassa Springs Attraction in Florida (now part of Homosassa Springs Wildlife State Park). Hammer retired from acting in 1969 and became the first black bear at the Dreher Park Zoo (later renamed the Palm Beach Zoo) in West Palm Beach, Florida, where he lived for almost 20 years. Derrick Rosaire Sr. continued to exhibit his bear named "Gentle Ben" throughout the 1970s. The fate of the other bear actors involved in Gentle Ben and the Gentle Giant pilot film is not currently known.

Although the bear character in a subsequent television series, The Life and Times of Grizzly Adams, was also named "Ben", that character was played by a grizzly bear rather than a black bear, and the show, character and bear actor had no connection to Gentle Ben, except for trainer Steve Martin supplying some animals (including a "backup" grizzly named Grizz) to the Grizzly Adams show.

=== Production ===
Gentle Ben was filmed in Florida at the Ivan Tors Studios (now Greenwich Studios) in North Miami and at various locations in the surrounding area, including Homosassa Springs and Fairchild Tropical Botanic Garden. The bears, who were from the northern United States or Canada and thus used to colder temperatures, had trouble adjusting to the warm climate. Following a severe flood that caused major damage to Africa U.S.A. in January 1969, the bears working on the show were relocated permanently to Homosassa Springs, where the Ivan Tors Animal Actor Training School was then operating.

Writers for the series included Roswell Rogers, Earl Hamner, Jr., Tam Spiva, Rance Howard, Gilbert Ralston, and Frank Telford. Many of the plots focused on themes relating to Tom Wedloe's work as a wildlife officer, such as animal management, lost children, disasters such as hurricanes or fires, and poaching or other illegal activities taking place in Wedloe's jurisdiction. In addition to Ben, other animals were frequently featured. A recurring plot device involved a stranger encountering Ben for the first time and being terrified, until Mark explained that Ben was not dangerous.

In the series, Tom Wedloe often traveled the Everglades via airboat and Jeep, while Henry Boomhauer drove a swamp buggy. The airboat, with the characters of Tom, Mark, Ellen, and Ben the bear riding it, was prominently featured in the show's opening credits. Dennis Weaver later recounted an incident where one of the bear actors, Hammer, capsized the airboat.

According to trainer Monty Cox, Ivan Tors once expressed concern that when Bruno the bear walked away from the camera, his testicles were visible in some shots, and asked if Cox could somehow tape them up so they would be out of camera view. Cox refused.

Several people involved with the series, including Cox, have confirmed that the bears used in the production were sometimes ill-tempered or did not behave as expected, and that working with them could be dangerous. On one occasion, Bruno the bear sat on Clint Howard. According to Dennis Weaver, during the run of the show, the cast and crew were forbidden to publicly mention any incidents of bear misbehavior. However, Clint Howard has stated that he never suffered any injuries from the bears on the show, and that his only injury came from working with a raccoon that had not been declawed.

=== Reception ===
Gentle Ben was a hit, reaching a position of #2 in the Nielsen ratings during its first season. A number of TV tie-in products were marketed, including children's books (by authors other than Walt Morey), a board game and a pull-string talking "Gentle Ben" plush bear by Mattel, a lunchbox, and an album of songs sung by the cast members entitled The Stars of "Gentle Ben": The Bear Facts. Dell Comics produced a Gentle Ben comic book, featuring photo covers of the TV show actors, that ran for five issues in 1968.

However, in its second season, Gentle Ben failed to consistently make the top 20 and was cancelled. Its decline in popularity has been attributed to its young target audience growing older and losing interest in animal shows, and also to its timeslot forcing it to compete with Walt Disney's Wonderful World of Color for its target audience. A letter-writing campaign to save the show (even read into the Congressional Record) resulted in 2600 letters being sent to the network, but was not successful.

In spite of its short lifespan and cancellation, the show continued to run regularly in syndication, including outside the United States. Personal appearances by "Gentle Ben" at circuses and events continued to be popular into the 1970s. In October 1969, after the cancellation of the show, "Gentle Ben" the bear even received a personalized invitation from Florida Governor Claude R. Kirk, Jr. to a celebrity party in Fort Lauderdale.

=== Controversy over portrayal of bears ===
Although the show was praised for promoting respect for nature and family values, it also drew criticism for its unrealistic portrayal of a wild bear's interaction with humans. Some critics noted that the show premiered only a few weeks after the well-publicized Glacier National Park, Montana fatal grizzly bear attacks of August 13, 1967, when two female campers were killed by grizzly bears, in separate incidents and locations, on the same night. When the show debuted, PTA Magazine complained that "[f]or years, there have been warnings to children and adults against feeding and playing with bears...How CBS could permit a program with a black bear for a pet—not a cub either—but a gigantic adult bear—is beyond our comprehension."

In 1971, John Hast, the chief National Park Service officer, stated that "[t]he television series 'Gentle Ben' was the worst thing that ever happened to us. People saw this big lovable bear on television and when they see a bear in the park I guess they think it's the same one. They don't realize how wrong they are until they're bleeding."

Sweden also refused to broadcast the show due to concerns that children would be influenced to play and interact with the wild bears indigenous to that country.

== Home media ==
On October 15, 2013, CBS Home Entertainment (distributed by Paramount) released season 1 on DVD in Region 1. The second and final season was released on February 18, 2014.

== 1981 animated cartoon Gentle Ben ==
In 1981, a short-lived animated cartoon called Gentle Ben was released in syndication by the Gentle Ben Animation Co. The main character, Gentle Ben the bear, was portrayed as a crime-fighting superhero who wore a cape.

== 2000s TV films ==
In the early 2000s, two TV film remakes of the original series were sponsored by the Animal Planet cable channel in association with Hallmark Entertainment. In both remakes, "Ben" was played by Bonkers, a 6-foot-tall, 650 pound male American black bear trained by Ruth La Barge.

Gentle Ben (also known as Gentle Ben: The Movie and Gentle Ben: Terror on the Mountain) was first shown on 25 March 2002, although some cable airings list it with a 2003 date.

Gentle Ben 2 (also known as Gentle Ben: Danger on the Mountain) was first shown on 5 January 2003. It was known as Gentle Ben: Black Gold for its UK release.

=== Cast ===
- Dean Cain as Jack Wedloe
- Corbin Bernsen as Fog Benson
- Ashley Laurence as Dakota
- Reiley McClendon as Mark Wedloe
- Cody Weiant as Ashley June Benson
- Collin Bernsen as Kyle
- Gil Birmingham as Pete
- Jack Conley as Cal Striker
- Jeanne Cooper as Rowland (uncredited)
- Martin Kove as Sully
- Bonkers the Bear as Ben
