= Walt Morey =

American novelist

- Born: 3 February 1907; Hoquiam, Washington, USA
- Died: 12 January 1992 (aged 84); Wilsonville, Oregon
- Occupation: Author
- Spouse(s): Rosalind Ogden (m. 1934 − 1977, her death); Peggy Kilburn (m. 1978)
- Writing career
- Genres: Children's books, novels

Walter Morey (February 3, 1907 – January 12, 1992), was a writer of numerous works of children's fiction, set in the U.S. Pacific Northwest and Alaska, the places where Morey lived for all of his life. His book Gentle Ben was the basis for the 1967 movie Gentle Giant and the 1967-1969 television show Gentle Ben.

He wrote a total of 17 published books, most of which involve as a central plot element the relationship between man and animals. Many of his works involve survival stories, or people going into the wild to "discover" themselves; redemption through nature is a common theme of Morey's works.

== Life and career ==
Morey began going to school in 1912, in Jasper, Oregon. He was never very keen on school. In 1934 he began working in a veneer plant, making brushes in a paintbrush factory and doing work in the woods. On July 8, 1934, he married his first wife, Rosalind Ogden, in Portland, Oregon. Rosalind died February 28, 1977. On June 26, 1978, he married Peggy Kilburn.

Early in his writing career, he also published numerous short pulp fiction stories. For much of his life, he was a boxer and diver, in addition to being an author.

Morey won awards for his books Gentle Ben, Kävik the Wolf Dog, Canyon Winter, Runaway Stallion, Run Far Run Fast, and Year of the Black Pony.

- Dutton Animal Book Award for Gentle Ben and Kavik the Wolf Dog
- Sequoyah Book Award
- Dorothy Canfield Fisher Award
- The Monique Alexis Hoswoot Award
- William Allen White Children's Book Award

== Bibliography ==
- No Cheers, No Glory (1945)
- Gentle Ben (1965)
- North to Danger (1967)
- Kävik the Wolf Dog (1968)
- Angry Waters (1969)
- Runaway Stallion (1970)
- Gloomy Gus (1970)
- Deep Trouble (1971)
- The Bear of Friday Creek (1971), illustrated by Derek Collard
- Scrub Dog of Alaska (1971)
- Canyon Winter (1972)
- Home is the North (1973)
- Run Far, Run Fast (1974)
- Operation Blue Bear (1975)
- Year of the Black Pony (1976)
- Sandy and the Rock Star (1979)
- Hero (1980)
- The Lemon Meringue Dog (1980)
- Death Walk (1991)

== Memorials ==
Morey lived on property he owned in Wilsonville, Oregon and wrote many of his books there. After his death, his widow sold the property to developers. The resulting development was named Morey's Landing and also contains Walt Morey Park, a bear-themed park that features an 8-foot-tall life-size carved wooden statue of Morey's famous fictional bear, Gentle Ben. In 2012, the Gentle Ben statue was stolen from the park by local teens and dumped in a roadside ditch. It was later found and returned to the park.

The Wilsonville Public Library has also honored Morey by naming its Walt Morey Children's Room after him, displaying a 3-foot-tall bronze statue of him and occasionally displaying other memorabilia, such as his typewriter and editions of his books.

The Reynolds School District in Troutdale, Oregon, opened Walt Morey Middle School in 1998.
