= Marine World/Africa USA =

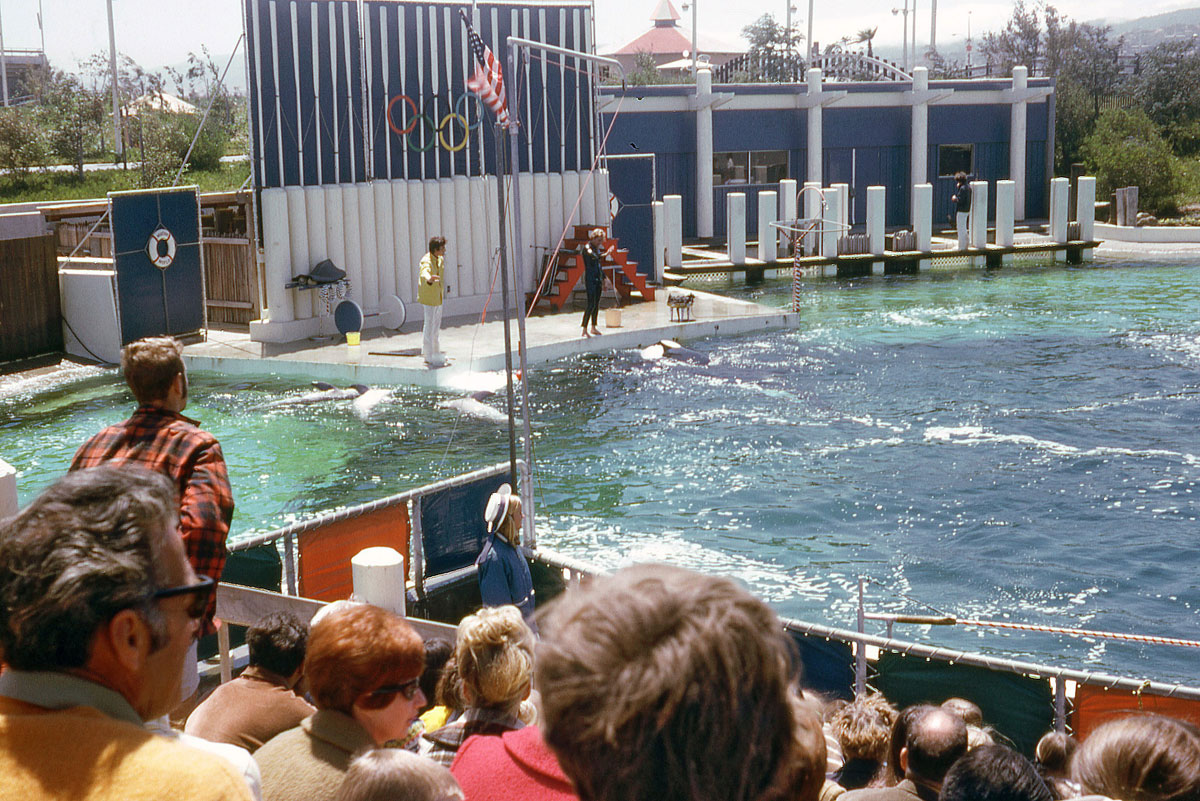
- Orca show at Marine World in 1970
- Interactive map of Marine World/Africa USA
- 37°32′N 122°16′W
- Date opened: 1968
- Date closed: 1985
- Location: Redwood Shores, California, United States (1968–1985)
- Land area: 66 acres (27 ha)
- No. of animals: 500
- No. of species: 400
- Memberships: 389

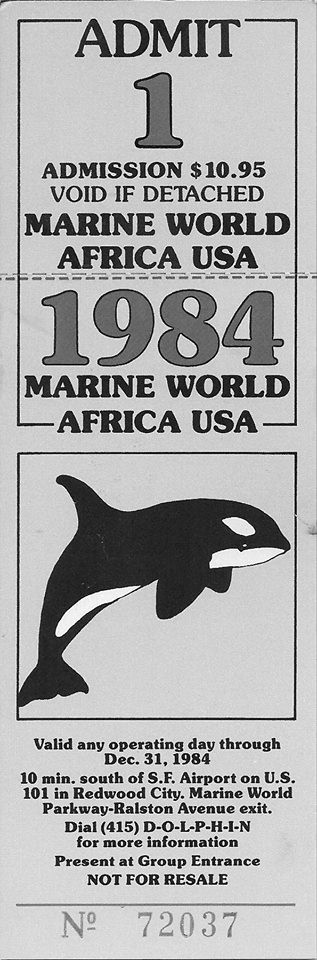
1984 ticket for Marine World Africa USA

Marine World/Africa USA was an animal theme park located in the Redwood Shores area of Redwood City, California. The park was named Marine World when it first opened in 1968, before merging with a land-animal park called Africa USA in 1972. In 1986, the park relocated to Vallejo, California, and is now known as Six Flags Discovery Kingdom.

== Origins of the Africa U.S.A. name ==
There were two successive Africa U.S.A. parks in California, both associated with animal trainer Ralph Helfer. The first Africa U.S.A. in California was created in 1962 as a 600-acre (240-hectare) affection training compound by Ralph and Toni Helfer. It was located in Soledad Canyon near Palmdale, north of Los Angeles.

Ivan Tors first discovered Clarence, the cross-eyed lion, at Africa, U.S.A. and it inspired him to create the film Clarence, the Cross-Eyed Lion (1965) and the spin-off television series Daktari, which was partly shot on location there. Judy the chimp, another star of the show, was also owned by Ralph Helfer. A few other shows such as Cowboy in Africa, Gentle Ben, as well as an episode of Star Trek ("Shore Leave") were also shot there. Helfer provided both the location and the animals.

In January 1969, Africa U.S.A. was struck by a powerful rainstorm over Soledad Canyon. The resulting severe flooding and mudslides in the canyons destroyed the compound, but only nine of Helfer's 1,500 animals had drowned. Helfer first relocated his animals to a second site in Ventura County before the move to Redwood City.

The original Africa U.S.A. property was located at 8237 Soledad Canyon Road. Other animal trainers unsuccessfully attempted to use the property after Helfer's departure. The property was first converted to the Little Africa RV park by 1973, and then the Robin's Nest Recreational Resort in the 1980s. Heavily damaged by the Sand Fire (2016), the property was sold on June 29, 2018, to the Mountains Recreation & Conservation Authority with the assistance of The Trust for Public Land, and is currently being restored to its natural condition in preparation for reopening to the public.

== Marine World/Africa U.S.A. ==
The Marine World/Africa U.S.A. site occupied approximately 66 acres (27 hectares) of reclaimed tidelands in the San Francisco Bay within the confines of the Redwood Shores district of Redwood City. Numerous shallow sloughs, which have long been filled in, are known to have meandered across the property in its natural state. The general area of the site was diked off from the bay about 1910, and was used for pasture until about 1946 when it was converted to salt evaporation ponds. The site was then cleaned and leveled, and between 1964 and 1965, received about two feet (60 cm) of fill dirt. Construction of Marine World took place between 1966 and 1968. Available topographic surveys indicate that surcharges of two to three feet (1 m) were placed over some of the old slough areas prior to construction of the animal park.

Marine World opened in July 1968. The park was owned and operated by the American Broadcasting Company. The park's original attractions were based around sea creatures on display and marine–themed shows. These shows included orcas, seals, and during the waterski and boat show, a water skiing elephant named Judy. By modern standards, many of these attractions would be considered unethical to animals. However, during its time period the park took an animal "preservationist" stance, and it was a common site for fundraising efforts by environmental groups.

The performances of the shows required fast low-wake ski boats which were developed locally and known as "Avenger" hull series boats which would later influence companies like Master Craft to achieve faster ski boats for pleasure craft use. Marine World changed management in late 1969 during the off-season, adding new animal displays, including a large elephant seal named "Big Lou". Marine World management had been in discussions with Ralph Helfer shortly after the Africa U.S.A. flood, at the behest of Lanny Cornell, a well known animal veterinarian in the industry. Plans to incorporate Africa U.S.A. took almost a full year to design and implement. Ralph Helfer and Resorts International eventually bought out Marine World in 1972 when it went bankrupt, renaming the park as Marine World/Africa U.S.A. and adding the wildlife park portion and the "jungle theater".

One of the park's star attractions was that it was home to Mardji, a trained Asian elephant that portrayed the Banthas in the original Star Wars film and that was also filmed for reference movement of the AT-ATs in The Empire Strikes Back. Mardji's original Bantha costume was on display for visitors to view at her enclosure. Mardji died on November 26, 1995, in Six Flags Discovery Kingdom in Vallejo, California.

== Campus closure and move ==
Due to financial struggles, the Marine World/Africa U.S.A. park moved in 1986 to Vallejo, California, where it eventually became Six Flags Discovery Kingdom. The Redwood Shores location of the former Marine World/Africa U.S.A. became an office complex for Oracle Corporation.
