= Daktari =

American TV series (1966–1969)

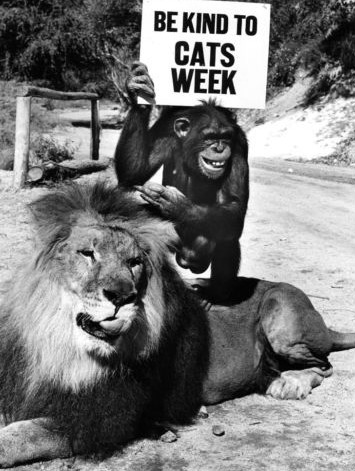
- Clarence and Judy
- Genre: Children's drama Adventure
- Created by: Art Arthur; Ivan Tors
- Written by: William Clark; Meyer Dolinsky; Lawrence L. Goldman; Alf Harris; John Hogan; Jack Jacobs; Robert Lees; Robert Lewin; D.D. Oldland; S.S. Schweitzer; Stanley H. Silverman; Malvin Wald
- Directed by: Paul Landres; Andrew Marton; Otto Lang
- Starring: Marshall Thompson; Cheryl Miller; Hari Rhodes; Erin Moran; Yale Summers; Hedley Mattingly
- Theme music composer: Shelly Manne; Henry Vars
- Composers: Herbert Doerfel; Shelly Manne; Henry Vars
- Country of origin: United States
- Original language: English
- No. of seasons: 4
- No. of episodes: 89 (list of episodes)

Production
- Executive producer: Ivan Tors
- Producer: Leonard B. Kaufman
- Cinematography: William A. Fraker; Fred Mandl; Paul Ivano; Richard Moore
- Editor: George Hively
- Running time: 45–48 minutes
- Production companies: Ivan Tors Productions; Metro-Goldwyn-Mayer Television

Original release
- Network: CBS
- Release: January 11, 1966 – January 15, 1969

Related
- Clarence, the Cross-Eyed Lion

Daktari (Swahili for "doctor") is an American family drama series that aired on CBS between 1966 and 1969. The series is an Ivan Tors Films Production in association with MGM Television starring Marshall Thompson as Marsh Tracy, a veterinarian at the fictional Wameru Study Center for Animal Behavior in East Africa.

== Concept ==
The show follows the work of Tracy, his daughter Paula (Cheryl Miller), and his staff, who frequently protect animals from poachers and local officials. Tracy's pets, a cross-eyed lion named Clarence and a chimpanzee named Judy, were also popular characters.

Daktari was based upon the 1965 film Clarence, the Cross-Eyed Lion, which also stars Thompson as Tracy and Miller as his daughter. The concept was developed by producer Ivan Tors, inspired by the work of Dr. Antonie Marinus Harthoorn and his wife, Sue, at their animal orphanage in Nairobi. Dr. Harthoorn helped invent the capture gun, and was a tireless campaigner for animal rights. Daktari means 'doctor' in the local Swahili language.

On the series, Clarence did not do all his own stunts; he had a stand-in. Leo (previously known as Zamba), another lion trained by Ralph Helfer, doubled for Clarence whenever any trucks were involved because Clarence was frightened of large motorized vehicles. Leo had his own makeup artist apply cosmetic scarring like Clarence's so that he would resemble Clarence in closeups. An inside joke from the preview trailer for the film Clarence, the Cross-Eyed Lion was that Leo the MGM logo was not related to Clarence (in addition to similar appearances, the lions had similar temperaments).

Another less friendly lion, also named Leo, doubled for Clarence in some scenes. He was used only for the snarling scenes and scenes not involving proximity with humans. His ferocity was genuine, the result of physical abuse by his previous captors.

In the show's final season, child star Erin Moran joined the cast as Jenny Jones, a seven-year-old orphan who becomes part of the Tracy household.

== Cast ==
- Marshall Thompson as Marsh Tracy
- Cheryl Miller as Paula Tracy
- Hedley Mattingly as District Officer Hedley
- Hari Rhodes as Mike Makula
- Yale Summers as Jack Dane (1966–1968)
- Ross Hagen as Bart Jason (1968–1969)
- Erin Moran as Jenny Jones (1968–1969)
- Judy the Chimp as Judy

Clarence the Lion died at the age of 7 on July 14, 1969, six months after Daktari was last telecast on CBS. When he was not being filmed, the lion was booked as an attraction at expositions and died in Peoria, Illinois, where he was scheduled to appear at the Heart of Illinois Fair.

Notable guest stars over the years included Louis Gossett Jr., Sterling Holloway, Bruce Bennett, Virginia Mayo, Chips Rafferty, Paul Winfield and Don Marshall.

Bruno the Bear also appeared as a guest star before he became the main bear playing the title role in the later Ivan Tors series, Gentle Ben.

== Episodes ==
The series was broadcast in four seasons, the first in early 1966, and the last three each beginning in September 1966, 1967, and 1968.

Season	Episodes	Originally released	
Season	Episodes	First released	Last released
1	18	January 11, 1966	May 17, 1966
2	29	September 13, 1966	April 11, 1967
3	27	September 5, 1967	March 12, 1968
4	15	September 25, 1968	January 15, 1969

== Broadcast history and Nielsen ratings ==
The original broadcasts in the US were on CBS.

Season	Time slot (ET)	Rank	Rating
1965–66	Tuesday at 7:30 pm	14	23.9
1966–67	Tuesday at 7:30 pm	7	23.4 (tied with Bewitched and The Beverly Hillbillies)
1967–68	Tuesday at 7:30 pm	33	19.7
1968–69	Wednesday at 7:30 pm	69	N/A

According to IMDB it was also broadcast on TV channels in the UK, the Netherlands, Yugoslavia (Croatia), Portugal, and (dubbed) in Germany, France, Brazil and Romania.

== Production notes ==
=== Location ===
According to the show's closing credits, it was "filmed in Africa and Africa USA", a 600-acre (2.4 km^{2}) wild-animal ranch created by animal trainers Ralph and Toni Helfer in Soledad Canyon 40 mi (64 km) north of Los Angeles. Ralph Helfer was the animal coordinator of the show. Leonard B. Kaufman, the producer, wrote in liner notes for Shelly Manne's Daktari that he shot the series on location close to a ranch once owned by Antonio Pintos' father in Mozambique. Indeed, the outdoor scenes involving the actors were shot in the Africa U.S.A. compound in California, with footage of African landscape and animals in between to get the African look and feel. Some of the animals shown were, however, at odds with the location – a tiger (not native to Africa) is shown in the starting credit sequence, as well as an Indian elephant.

Other indoor and some outdoor scenes of the animal hospital were shot in Ivan Tors' studios in Florida.

=== Music ===
The show had distinctive theme and incidental music, a fusion of jazz and African influences, conducted by American jazz drummer Shelly Manne. Manne released the associated record, Daktari: Shelly Manne Performs and Conducts His Original Music for the Hit TV Show, on the Atlantic label in 1967. On the album, Mike Wofford plays a tack piano to evoke an African sound, and Manne is joined by percussionists Emil Richards, Larry Bunker, Frank Carlson, and Victor Feldman. According to the record liner notes, Manne and fellow percussionists play ankle and wrist jingles, Lujon, Thai mouth organs, angklungs, ocarinas, vibraphones, tympani, and different kinds of marimbas.

=== Vehicles ===
The series featured several Land Rover four-wheel-drive cars and also a Jeep Gladiator pickup truck with a zebra-striped paint scheme. Corgi Toys produced a green and black zebra-striped toy version of a Land Rover, available in several different action sets.

== Home media ==
Warner Bros. has released all four seasons on DVD in Region 1 via their Warner Archive Collection manufacture-on-demand series.

== See also ==
- Cowboy in Africa
- Antonie Marinus Harthoorn
- Born Free (1966 movie)
