= Xenia Kalogeropoulou =

Greek actress

- Born: September 12, 1936 (age 90); Athens, Greece
- Occupation: Actress
- Years active: 1958-2019

Xenia Kalogeropoulou (Greek: Ξένια Καλογεροπούλου; born September 12, 1936) is a Greek actress, who appeared in both Greek and English-speaking films in her career. With her career, spanning six decades, she has appeared in over forty films and television shows.

== Biography ==
Kalogeropoulou was born in Athens, Greece and studied acting at the Royal Academy of Dramatic Art. She made her acting debut in the 1956 play, La Troupe Francaise. She broke into the movies with a minor part in Mrs. Midwife. She would go on to appear in Marriage Adventures (1959), West Side and East Side (1959), Soldiers in Uniform (1960), and Lisa, Tosca of Athens (1961). Her first starring role was in 1961's, 2000 Sailors and a Girl.

In 1960, she starred alongside Jayne Mansfield and newcomer Trax Colton in It Happened in Athens, a film that was not released until 1962. As the 1960s progressed, Xenia received steady acting work. She made her television debut in a 1976 episode of Athanates istories agapis. She retired from film acting after making an appearance on Our Old Friends in 1985, but returned in 2013 with a role in the film Before Midnight, which was her fortieth film.

In 1964, she won the best actress award in Thessaloniki Film Festival for the film Gamos Ala Ellinika.

== Awards ==
Awards
Year	Award	Film	Result
1964	Thessaloniki Festival Award for best actress	Gamos Ala Ellinika	Won
