= Alan Caillou =

English actor and writer (1914–2006)

- Alan Caillou in Centennial 1979
- Born: Alan Samuel Lyle-Smythe; 9 November 1914; Surrey, England, UK
- Died: 1 October 2006 (aged 91); Sedona, Arizona, U.S.
- Occupations: Author, actor, screenwriter, soldier, policeman and professional hunter
- Spouse: Aliza Sverdova (m. 1939)
- Children: 1

Alan Samuel Lyle-Smythe MBE, M.C. (9 November 1914 – 1 October 2006), who wrote under the name Alan Caillou, was an English-born author, actor, screenwriter, soldier, policeman and professional hunter.

== Biography ==
Alan Lyle-Smythe was born in Surrey, England. Prior to World War II, he served with the Palestine Police from 1936 to 1939 and learned the Arabic language. He was awarded an MBE in June 1938. He married Aliza Sverdova in 1939, then studied acting from 1939 to 1941.

In January 1940, Lyle-Smythe was commissioned in the Royal Army Service Corps. Due to his linguistic skills, he transferred to the Intelligence Corps and served in the Western Desert, in which he used the surname "Caillou" (the French word for 'pebble') as an alias.

He was captured in North Africa, imprisoned and threatened with execution in Italy, then escaped to join the British forces at Salerno. He was then posted to serve with the partisans in Yugoslavia. He wrote about his experiences in the book The World is Six Feet Square (1954). He was promoted to captain and awarded the Military Cross in 1944.

Following the war, he returned to the Palestine Police from 1946 to 1947, then served as a Police Commissioner in British-occupied Italian Somaliland from 1947 to 1952, where he was recommissioned a captain. He wrote about this experience in the memoir Sheba Slept Here.

After working as a District Officer in Somalia and as a professional hunter, Lyle-Smythe moved to Canada, where he worked as a hunter and then became an actor on Canadian television.

== Writing career ==
He wrote his first novel, Rogue's Gambit, in 1955, first using the name Caillou, one of his aliases from the war. Moving from Vancouver to Hollywood, he made an appearance as a contestant on the 23 January 1958 edition of You Bet Your Life.

He appeared as an actor and/or worked as a screenwriter in such shows as Daktari, The Man From U.N.C.L.E. (including the screenwriting for "The Quadripartite Affair" and "The Giucco Piano Affair" in Season 1 and "The Bow-Wow Affair" from 1965), Thriller, Daniel Boone, Quark, Centennial, and How the West Was Won. In 1966-67, he had a recurring role (as Jason Flood) in NBC's "Tarzan" TV series starring Ron Ely. Caillou appeared in such television movies as Sole Survivor (1970), The Hound of the Baskervilles (1972, as Inspector Lestrade), and Goliath Awaits (1981). His cinema film credits included roles in Five Weeks in a Balloon (1962), Clarence, the Cross-Eyed Lion (1965), The Rare Breed (1966), The Devil's Brigade (1968), Hellfighters (1968), Everything You Always Wanted to Know About Sex* (*But Were Afraid to Ask) (1972), Herbie Goes to Monte Carlo (1977), Beyond Evil (1980), The Sword and the Sorcerer (1982) and The Ice Pirates (1984).

Caillou wrote 52 paperback thrillers under his own name and the nom de plume of Alex Webb, with such heroes as Cabot Cain, Colonel Matthew Tobin, Mike Benasque, Ian Quayle and Josh Dekker, as well as writing many magazine stories.

Several of Caillou's novels were filmed, such as Rampage with Robert Mitchum in 1963, based on his big game hunting knowledge; Assault on Agathon (with Nico Minardos as Cabot Cain), for which Caillou also wrote the screenplay; and The Cheetahs, filmed in 1989.

== Personal life ==
He was married to Aliza Sverdova from 1939 until his death. Their daughter Nadia Caillou (7 October 1952 – 5 February 2019) was the screenwriter for Skeleton Coast (1987).

== Death ==
Alan Caillou died in Sedona, Arizona in 2006.

== Partial filmography ==
- Journey to the Center of the Earth (1959) — Rector (uncredited)
- "Have Gun--Will Travel" (1959 TV series) S3 E7 "Fragile" - Roy Cooney
- Seven Thieves (1960) — Doctor Gerald Halsey (uncredited)
- The Fiercest Heart (1961) — Major Adrian
- Pirates of Tortuga (1961) — Ringose (uncredited)
- It Happened in Athens (1962) — Narrator (voice)
- Five Weeks in a Balloon (1962) — Inspector
- Bonanza (TV series, 1962–1970) — Walter Craigsmuir / Jim Hare (2 episodes)
- The List of Adrian Messenger (1963) — Insp. Seymour (uncredited)
- Signpost to Murder (1964) — Dr. Upjohn (uncredited)
- Strange Bedfellows (1965) — Magistrate (uncredited)
- Clarence, the Cross-Eyed Lion (1965) — Carter
- The Rare Breed (1966) — Taylor
- Tarzan (1966 TV series)#Season 1: 1966–67 Season 1, Episode 1: "Eyes of the Lion" (1966) — Jason Flood
- The Devil's Brigade (1968) — Gen. Marlin
- Hellfighters (1968) — Harry York
- Sole Survivor (1970) — Albanian
- The Hound of the Baskervilles (1972, TV Movie) — Inspector Lestrade
- Everything You Always Wanted to Know About Sex* (*But Were Afraid to Ask) (1972) — The Fool's Father
- Dixie Dynamite (1976) — Englishman
- Herbie Goes to Monte Carlo (1977) — Emile
- Quark (1977–78) — The Head (TV series, 8 episodes)
- Beyond Evil (1980) — Police Inspector
- Gauguin the Savage (1980) — Inspector Aumont
- The Sword and the Sorcerer (1982) — King Sancho
- The Ice Pirates (1984) — Count Paisley (final film role)

== Sources ==
- Works by Alan Caillou at Open Library
