= László Benedek =

Hungarian-born American film director (1905–1992)

- Born: Benedek László; Berger László; March 5, 1905; Budapest, Hungary
- Died: March 11, 1992 (aged 87); New York City, U.S.
- Resting place: Woodlawn Cemetery (Bronx, New York)
- Citizenship: Hungarian; American
- Years active: 1930-1944 editor/assistant director 1944-1976 director
- Notable work: The Wild One (1953) (director)
- Spouse(s): Rejtő Mária (1939-1948) (divorced); Lacerta Weiss (1950-?) (divorced, 2 children)
- Partner: Danielle DeMers (1944-2013)
- Children: 2

László Benedek (Hungarian pronunciation: [ˈlaːsloː ˈbɛnɛdɛk]; March 5, 1905 – March 11, 1992; sometimes Laslo Benedek) was a Hungarian-born film director and cinematographer, most notable for directing The Wild One (1953).

He gained recognition for his direction of the film version of Death of a Salesman (1951), for which he won the Golden Globe Award for Best Director and a Best Director nomination from the Directors Guild of America. However, it was for his directorial efforts on his next project that Benedek is best remembered. His motorcycle gang film The Wild One (1953) caused a storm of controversy and was banned in the United Kingdom until 1968.

== Biography ==
=== Early life and European career ===
He was born in Budapest; his half-brother was George Gerbner. Benedek intended to be a psychiatrist and studied at Vienna and Berlin. He worked in the film industry to pay his bills and ended up deciding to focus on that instead.

In Germany, Benedek was cinematographer on The Mistress (1927). He was assistant director on The Great Longing (1929), directed by Steve Sekely, and edited and assisted directed The Man Who Murdered (1931) for director Curtis Bernhardt. He worked at UFA for Joe Pasternak until 1933. He assisted on Hyppolit, the Butler (1931) and edited Die Wasserteufel von Hieflau (1932), and Miss Iza (1933).

When the Nazis came to power, Benedek followed Pasternak to Vienna then Hungary where he edited A Precocious Girl (1934) starring Franciska Gaal and Temptation (1934), both directed by Max Neufeld; he was assistant director on the latter.

He went to England where he worked as a writer on The Secret of Stamboul (1936), directed by fellow Hungarian expatriate Andrew Marton. In 1937 he moved to the US.

=== Early US career ===
In the US, Benedek worked on the montage scenes of Test Pilot (1938) at MGM. He edited A Little Bit of Heaven (1940) for Pasternak at Universal.

At MGM he was assistant director on Song of Russia (1944) and worked as an associate producer under Joe Pasternak. Among his jobs included doing screen tests, second unit directing, and supervising the animated dance sequence in Anchors Aweigh (1945).

In 1946 he was linked with communist front organisations.

=== Director ===
Benedek made his feature film directing debut with The Kissing Bandit (1948) at MGM, produced by Pasternak; it was a notorious flop.

He went to Eagle Lion where he directed a noir, Port of New York (1949) starring Yul Brynner. For Stanley Kramer he then made Death of a Salesman (1951) which was a financial disappointment.

He produced but did not direct Storm Over Tibet (1952) (Marton directed), started to direct television, notably episodes of Footlights Theater, and The Ford Television Theatre.

Kramer gave him the job of The Wild One (1953) with Marlon Brando, originally called The Cyclist's Raid. He went over to Universal to do Bengal Rifles (1954) with Rock Hudson.

=== Return to Europe ===
Benedek returned to Germany to write and direct Sons, Mothers and a General (1955). Back in the US he made a short with Richard Widmark, Boy with a Knife (1956), then focused on television: The Loretta Young Show, Telephone Time, Four Star Theatre, Cavalcade of America,

Benedek returned to features with Affair in Havana (1957) starring John Cassavetes. He wanted to make Anna for Rank in Britain with Leslie Caron and Louis Jourdan but requested the script be rewritten and then Caron fell pregnant, causing the film to be abandoned.

He also directed Malaga a.k.a. Moment of Danger (1960) starring Dorothy Dandridge and Trevor Howard. This low budget crime drama was the last film made by Dandridge.

In France, he wrote and directed Recourse in Grace (1960) with Raf Vallone.

=== Television ===
In the 1960s Benedek mostly concentrated on TV, doing episodes of Perry Mason, The Naked City, Thriller, Zane Grey Theater, The Fugitive, The Doctors and the Nurses, The Outer Limits, Mannix, Voyage to the Bottom of the Sea, The Untouchables, The Alfred Hitchcock Hour, The Felony Squad, 12 O'Clock High, Iron Horse, and Custer.

In 1965 he directed a play Belial.

=== Final features ===
He returned to features when he produced and directed Namu, the Killer Whale (1967), for fellow Hungarian Ivan Tors. He directed Daring Game (1968) for Tors, then The Night Visitor (1971) and Assault on Agathon (1977).

=== Later career and death ===
From 1976 to 1980, he was chairman of the graduate film program at New York University's School of the Arts. In 1983, he became a visiting professor of film at the Annenberg School of Communication at the University of Pennsylvania. He went on to teach at the Film Academy in Munich, Germany, at Rice University in Houston, and at Columbia University in New York City.

Benedek died in 1992 in The Bronx, New York. He had two daughters, Melinda Norton and Barbara Rhodes, and at the time of his death was partner to painter and printmaker Danielle DeMers.

== Filmography ==
=== Director ===
- Song of Russia (1944)
- The Kissing Bandit (1948)
- Port of New York (1949)
- Death of a Salesman (1951)
- The Wild One (1953)
- Bengal Brigade (1954)
- Children, Mother, and the General (West Germany, 1955)
- Affair in Havana (1957)
- Recours en grâce (France, 1960)
- Malaga (1960)
- Namu, the Killer Whale (1966)
- Daring Game (1968)
- The Night Visitor (1971)
- Assault on Agathon (1975)

=== Cinematographer ===
- The Mistress (1927)
- The Man Who Murdered (1931)
- Miss Iza (1933)
- A Precocious Girl (1934)

=== Editor ===
- Temptation (1934)
- Antonia (1935)
