= Port of New York =

Port of New York may refer to:

- Port of New York and New Jersey
- Port Authority of New York and New Jersey
- Port of New York (film), a 1949 American film
