= It Happened in Athens =

1962 film by Andrew Marton

- Theatrical release poster
- Directed by: Andrew Marton
- Written by: László Vadnay
- Produced by: James S. Elliott; Robert L. Lippert
- Starring: Jayne Mansfield; Trax Colton; Maria Xénia; Nico Minardos; Bob Mathias
- Cinematography: Curt Courant
- Edited by: Jodie Copelan
- Music by: Manos Hatzidakis
- Production company: Associated Producers Inc (but credited to 20th Century Fox)
- Distributed by: Twentieth Century-Fox
- Release date: June 1962
- Running time: 100 minutes
- Country: United States
- Language: English

It Happened in Athens is a 1962 American sports comedy-drama film released by 20th Century-Fox. It is directed by Andrew Marton and features Jayne Mansfield, newcomer Trax Colton, Maria Xénia, Nico Minardos, Roger Browne in his debut, and Olympic champion Bob Mathias.

== Plot ==
In 1896, it is announced the Olympic Games will be revived and played in Athens. Young shepherd, Spiridon Loues (a fictionalized but sometimes accurate portrayal of water-carrier Spyridon Louis), decides to enter the 26-mile marathon. Once in Athens he meets Christina Gratsos, a young woman from his hometown who is now the personal maid to Greece's most famous actress, Eleni Costa. Eleni's lover, Lt. Alexi Vinardos, is a powerful man in Greece and a respected runner. Though Spiridon arrived after the entry date, his persistence and athletic prowess so impress the Olympic officials and Coach Graham, that he is admitted to compete in the race.

To promote herself, Eleni announces she'll marry the winner of the marathon, having faith that it will be her beloved Vinardos. Her proposal is heavily promoted in the press. However upon meeting Spiridon, Eleni pursues him romantically. Spiridon stays true to Christina, and tries to assuage her fear of being deserted for Eleni.

After starting the race in last, and accompanied most of the way by his small dog, Spiridon wins the race. Eleni has a change of heart and tells Spiridon to find Christina and marry her, stating "...she's your girl, not me". Spiridon tries to run to find Christina, but faints. He is revived two hours later and initially believes everything has been a dream. Christina finds Spiridon as he returns to the finishing line to remember his glory, and they share a kiss.

== Cast ==
- Trax Colton as Spiridon Loues
- Jayne Mansfield as Eleni Costa
- Xenia Kalogeropoulou (credited as Maria Xénia) as Christina Gratos
- Nico Minardos as Lt. Alexi Vinardos
- Bob Mathias as Coach Graham
- Ivan Triesault as Grandpa Loues/Mr. Trisapopolis
- Lili Valenty as Mama Loues
- Titos Vandis as Father Loues
- Charles Fawcett as Ambassador Cyrus T. Gaylord
- Jean Murat as Pierre de Coubertin
- Roger Browne (credited as Bill Browne) as Drake
- Marion Siva as Maria Loues
- Paul Müller as Priest
- Gustavo De Nardo as George
- Roger Fradet as Dubois
- Alberto Rabagliati : Greek supporter

== Production ==
The project was originally announced by Metro-Goldwyn-Mayer in 1951 from a story by Laslo Vadney which had been turned into a script by Everett Freeman. Sidney Sheldon was to produce with Ricardo Montalbán, John Hodiak or Fernando Lamas to star. It was intended to film in Greece. MGM eventually decided not to proceed with the film.

In 1960, it was announced 20th Century-Fox had purchased the script from MGM and were going to make it, with Robert Wagner mentioned as a possible star. The title was now And Seven From America, with the plot revolving around seven Americans who helped Spyridon Louis win the marathon. At one stage the film would be known as Winged Victory in Athens. Spyros Skouras of Fox announced the film would be one of three made in Greece by the studio, the others being The King Must Die and Thermopylae (which became The 300 Spartans).

The film was done under the API banner via producer Robert L. Lippert. API produced low-budget films for Fox, although the budget for It Happened In Athens would be higher than most API productions. At one stage Dean Stockwell was announced in the cast. In the earliest stages, Juliet Prowse was considered a possible contender for the female lead, but Fox decided to go with Jayne Mansfield instead. Both Nico Minardos and Bob Mathias were added to the cast shortly before filming began.

Filming commenced in October 1960 in Greece. It would end up being Mansfield's last film with Fox before her career setback to low-budget British and European melodramas and comedies. Newcomer Trax Colton was given the lead role of Spyridon. He had been discovered in a drug store and only made one film beforehand – a brief appearance in the 1961 film version of The Marriage-Go-Round. It was a publicity ploy by Fox to cast newcomer Colton opposite established sex symbol Mansfield. Fox had hoped to build Colton as a Rock Hudson-type movie star.

Although thought of as one of Mansfield's later low-budget films, It Happened in Athens was given a substantial budget and was shot in DeLuxe Color and CinemaScope. The end of the final race in the stadium was shot on October 23, 1960 with over 50,000 extras. When principal photography was completed in late 1960, the film was shelved for almost two years. Fox ultimately released It Happened in Athens in June 1962, hoping to recoup their finances following the costly production of Cleopatra (1963), which nearly bankrupted the studio. By the time the film was released, both Mansfield and Colton had been released from their contracts with Fox, and despite some positive reviews, It Happened in Athens failed to recoup its investment.

== See also ==
- List of American films of 1962
- List of films about the sport of athletics
