= George E. Diskant =

- Born: 22 February 1907; Manhattan, New York, US
- Died: February 22, 1965 (aged 58); Los Angeles, California, US
- Occupation: Cinematographer
- Years active: 1929-1965

George E. Diskant (February 22, 1907 – February 22, 1965) was a film and television cinematographer. After working as an assistant on a number of films in the early 1930s, Diskant graduated to first camera. Early jobs included a pair of Leon Errol shorts; Banjo, a dog story; and Anthony Mann's Desperate. Other films include a series of films noirs, including They Live by Night (1949), Port of New York (1949), The Racket (1951), On Dangerous Ground (1952), The Narrow Margin (1952), Beware, My Lovely (1952), and Kansas City Confidential (1952). Later in his career, Diskant worked in television on shows such as Playhouse 90, Sam Peckinpah's short-lived The Westerner, and many episodes of The Rifleman.
