= Assault on Agathon =

1975 film

- Theatrical poster
- Directed by: László Benedek
- Screenplay by: Alan Caillou
- Based on: Assault on Agathon novel by Alan Caillou
- Produced by: Nico Minardos
- Starring: Nico Minardos; Nina van Pallandt; Marianne Faithfull; John Woodvine
- Cinematography: Giorgos Arvanitis; Aris Stavrou
- Edited by: Igo Kantor
- Music by: Ken Thorne
- Distributed by: MGM
- Release date: July 24, 1975
- Running time: 96 minutes
- Country: United States
- Language: English

Assault on Agathon is a 1975 drama film directed by László Benedek and starring Nico Minardos, Nina van Pallandt, Marianne Faithfull and John Woodvine. It is based on a novel by Alan Caillou.

== Premise ==
Cabot Cain is a Western secret agent assigned to stop the mysterious Agathon, an ex-World War II revolutionary, who is committing terrorist acts in Greece and Albania.

== Production ==
Nico Minardos obtained financing for the film from Kjell Qvale, a Bay Area-based automotive entrepreneur who was then the majority shareholder in Jensen Motors. Minardos had approached Qvale for a product placement deal to use a Jensen Interceptor during filming but ultimately convinced Qvale to finance the entire movie.
