= Victoria Brynner =

Founder of Stardust Brands

- Born: November 5, 1962 (age 62)
- Occupation: Founder of Stardust Brands
- Father: Yul Brynner

Victoria Brynner (born 5 November 1962) is the founder of Stardust Brands, a consultancy that connects fashion and luxury brands with creative talent.

== Early life ==
Brynner is the daughter of Yul Brynner, a Russian-born, United States-based film and stage actor, and Doris Kleiner, a Chilean model and socialite. She grew up in Switzerland and Paris.

== Consulting career ==
Brynner has worked with global brands including Louis Vuitton, Christian Dior, Zac Posen and Versace.

In 2007, Brynner cast Mikhail Gorbachev, Catherine Deneuve, Andre Agassi and Steffi Graf to star in Louis Vuitton's Core Values campaign photographed by Annie Leibovitz.

Brynner was hired by Coty, Inc., in 2012 as creative consultant and executive producer for its global advertising campaign for Lady Gaga's fragrance Lady Gaga Fame.

In 2012, Brynner collaborated with Carine Roitfeld for the launch of CR Fashion Book where she produced and cast over 30 photo shoots. In 2013, she cast Johnny Depp in Christian Dior's men's fragrance, Sauvage.

== Personal life ==
In 2010, on the 25th anniversary of her father's death, Brynner published Yul Brynner: A Photographic Journey.

Brynner lives in Beverly Hills, California with her husband and business partner, Gino Sullivan, and their two children.
