= The Hound of the Baskervilles (1972 film) =

1972 film directed by Barry Crane

- Stewart Granger as Sherlock Holmes.
- Genre: Crime; Horror; Mystery
- Based on: The Hound of the Baskervilles by Arthur Conan Doyle
- Screenplay by: Robert E. Thompson
- Directed by: Barry Crane
- Starring: Stewart Granger; Bernard Fox; William Shatner
- Country of origin: United States
- Original language: English

Production
- Executive producer: Richard Irving
- Producer: Stanley Kallis
- Cinematography: Harry L. Wolf
- Editor: Bill Mosher
- Running time: 74 minutes
- Production company: Universal Television

Original release
- Network: ABC
- Release: February 12, 1972

The Hound of the Baskervilles is a 1972 American made-for-television horror mystery film directed by Barry Crane and starring Stewart Granger as Sherlock Holmes and Bernard Fox as Doctor Watson. The movie is based on Arthur Conan Doyle's 1902 Sherlock Holmes novel The Hound of the Baskervilles.

== Production ==
The Hound of the Baskervilles was the first American color version of the tale, and was produced by ABC-TV for their ABC Movie of the Week. The production was one of three pilots for a series of television movies featuring literary sleuths with the others being The Adventures of Nick Carter starring Robert Conrad, and A Very Missing Person with Eve Arden as Hildegarde Withers. The production utilized sets from other productions, mainly horror films.

== Cast ==
- Stewart Granger as Sherlock Holmes
- Bernard Fox as Dr. John H. Watson
- Ian Ireland as Sir Henry
- William Shatner as George Stapleton / Sir Hugo Baskerville
- Jane Merrow as Beryl Stapleton
- Anthony Zerbe as Dr. Mortimer
- Sally Ann Howes as Laura Frankland
- John Williams as Arthur Frankland
- Alan Caillou as Inspector Lestrade

== Reception ==
Ratings were poor and reviews were bad which caused the proposed series of tele-films to be shelved.

The Los Angeles Times called it "laborious, talky, often poorly staged and it suffers intermittently with show and tell direction" although it thought Granger and Fox were "quite acceptable" in their roles.
