= Yul Brynner =

Russian and American actor (1920–1985)

- Юл Бриннер
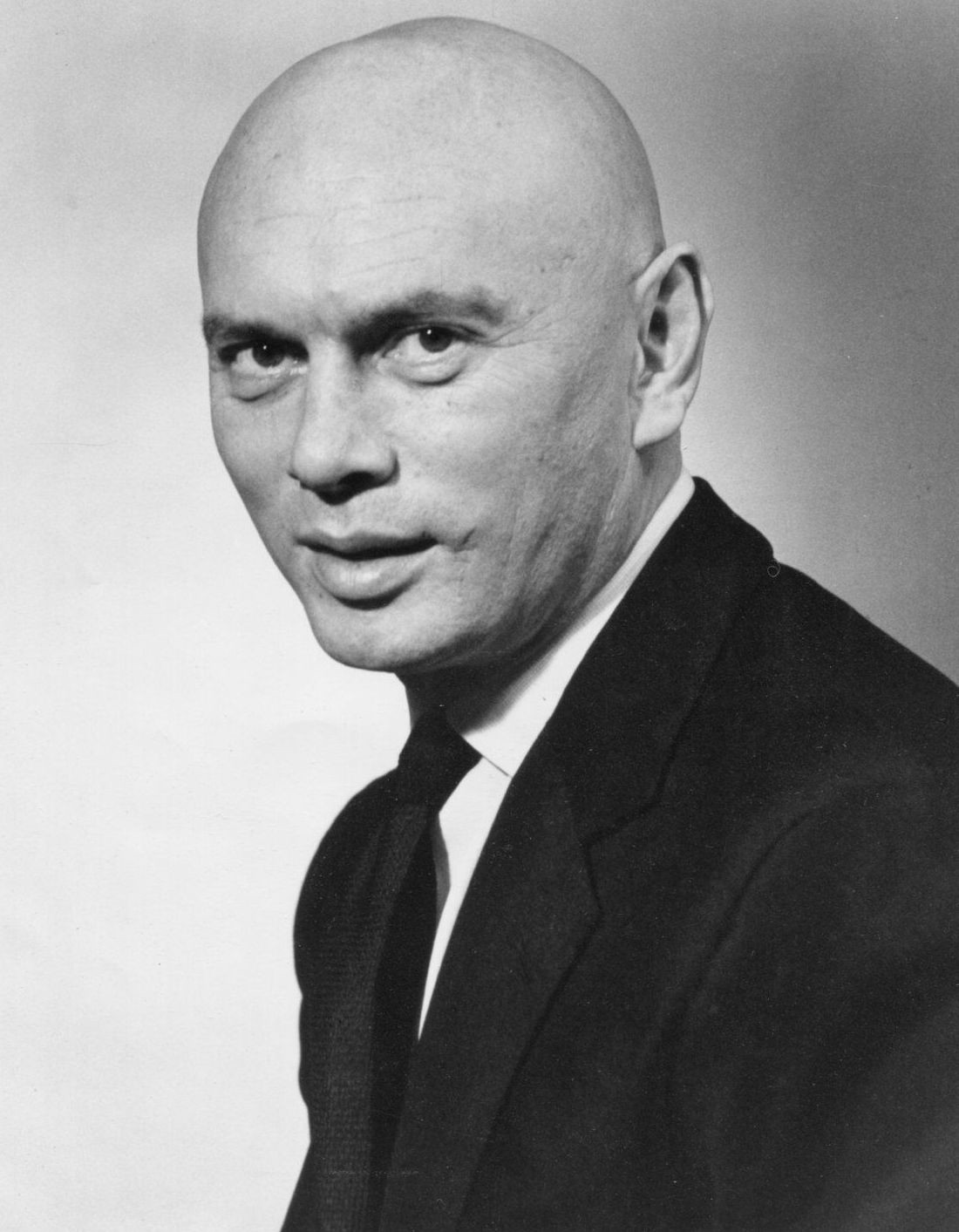
- Brynner in 1960
- Born: Yuliy Borisovich Briner; July 11, 1920; Vladivostok, Far Eastern Republic
- Died: October 10, 1985 (aged 65); New York City, U.S.
- Resting place: Abbaye royale Saint-Michel de Bois-Aubry (near Luzé, France)
- Citizenship: Soviet Union (1922–1943); U.S. (1943–1965); Switzerland
- Occupation: Actor
- Years active: 1941–1985
- Spouses: Virginia Gilmore (m. 1944; div. 1960) Doris Kleiner (m. 1960; div. 1967) Jacqueline Thion de la Chaume (m. 1971; div. 1981) Kathy Lee (m. 1983)
- Children: 5

Yuliy Borisovich Briner (Russian: Юлий Борисович Бринер; July 11, 1920 – October 10, 1985), known professionally as Yul Brynner (Russian: Юл Бриннер), was a Russian and American actor. He was known for his portrayal of King Mongkut in the Rodgers and Hammerstein stage musical The King and I (1951), for which he won two Tony Awards, and later an Academy Award for Best Actor for the 1956 film adaptation. He played the role 4,625 times on stage, and became known for his shaved head, which he maintained as a personal trademark long after adopting it for The King and I.

Considered one of the first Russian-American film stars, he was honored with a ceremony to put his handprints in front of Grauman's Chinese Theatre in Hollywood in 1956. He also received a star on the Hollywood Walk of Fame in 1960.

In 1956, Brynner received the National Board of Review Award for Best Actor for his portrayals of Rameses II in the Cecil B. DeMille epic The Ten Commandments and General Bounine in Anastasia. He was also well known as the gunman Chris Adams in The Magnificent Seven (1960) and its first sequel, Return of the Seven (1966). He had roles as the android "The Gunslinger" in Westworld (1973) and its sequel Futureworld (1976).

In addition to his film credits, he worked as a model and photographer, and wrote several books.

== Early life ==
=== In Russia ===
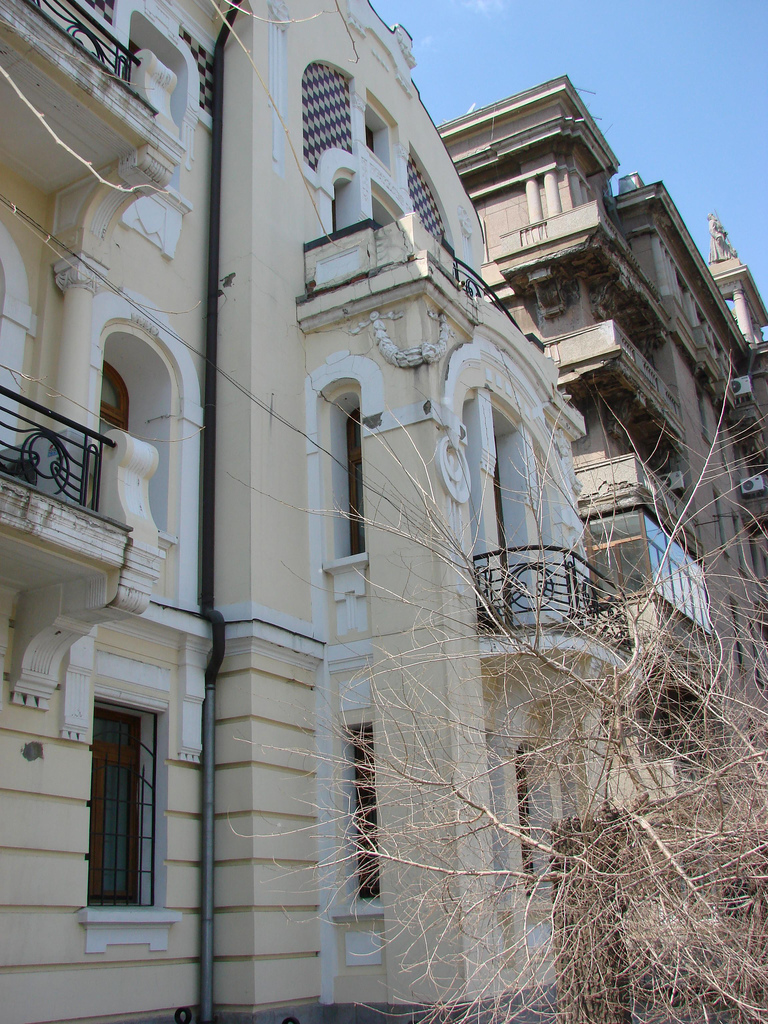
The Briner family mansion in Vladivostok, Russia, where Yul Brynner lived from 1920 to 1927

Yul Brynner was born Yuliy Borisovich Briner on July 11, 1920 in the city of Vladivostok. He had Swiss-German, Russian, and Buryat (Mongol) ancestry. While he also claimed Romani ancestry, no evidence has been found to support this. He was born at his parents' home, a four-storey house on 15 Aleutskaya Street, Vladivostok, into a wealthy Swiss Russian family of landowners and silver mining developers in Siberia and the Far East. He was named after his grandfather merchant Yuliy Ivanovich Brinner.

The Briner family enjoyed a good life at their four-storey mansion. At the time of his birth, Vladivostok was under Japanese occupation, while the territory was controlled by the Far Eastern Republic—a communist Russian buffer state. The Red Army occupied Vladivostok in October 1922, and most of the Briner family's wealth was confiscated by the state at the end of the Russian Civil War. The Briner family, including Yul's elder sister Vera, continued living in their house under a temporary status, even though the house had been seized.

Later in his life, Brynner humorously enjoyed telling tall tales and exaggerating his background and early life for the press and others, claiming that he was born Taidje Khan of a Mongol father and Roma mother on the Russian island of Sakhalin or that he was a nephew of Nicholas II. He occasionally referred to himself as Julius Briner, Jules Bryner, (Note: "Yul" is simply the short form of his given name "Yuliy", which itself is the Russian form of the name "Julius"; "Jules" is its French form.) or Youl Bryner. The 1989 biography by his son, Rock Brynner, clarified some of these issues.

Brynner's father, Boris Yuliyevich Briner, was a mining engineer and inventor of Swiss German and Russian descent. He graduated from Mining University in Saint Petersburg in 1910. The actor's grandfather Jules Briner (Бринер, Юлий Иванович) was a Swiss citizen who had moved to Vladivostok in the 1870s and established a successful import/export company. Brynner's paternal grandmother, Natalya Yosifovna Kurkutova, was a native of Irkutsk and a Eurasian of partial Buryat ancestry.

Brynner's mother, Maria (Marousia) Dimitrievna (née Blagovidova, Мария Дмитриевна Благовидова), hailed from the Russian intelligentsia and had studied to be an actress and singer. According to her son, she was of Russian Roma ancestry, but documents examined by modern historians of Vladivostok claimed the Briner family had no blood connections with Roma. Yul came into close contact with Roma culture in exile while working with his sister, singer Vera Brinner, and they were looking for a stage image. Vera later sharply objected to this appropriation. Brynner felt a strong personal connection to the Roma. In 1977, he was named honorary president of the International Romani Union, a title he kept until his death.

In 1922, after formation of the Soviet Union, Yul's father, Boris Briner, was required to relinquish his Swiss citizenship. All family members were made Soviet citizens. Brynner's father's work required extensive travel, and in 1923 in Moscow, he fell in love with actress Katerina Ivanovna Kornakova. She was the ex-wife of actor Aleksei Dikiy and the stage partner of Michael Chekhov at the Moscow Art Theatre. Many years later, Katerina Kornakova would help Brynner with her letter of recommendation asking Michael Chekhov to employ him in his theatre company in the United States.

In 1924, Yul's father divorced his mother, Marousia, but continued to support her and their children. His father also adopted a girl because his new wife was childless. Many years later, after the death of his father, Brynner took this adopted sister into his care. The father and son relationship remained complex and emotionally traumatic for Brynner.

After leaving his children and his former wife in Vladivostok, Boris Briner lived briefly in Moscow with Katerina Ivanovna Kornakova, but eventually they moved to Harbin, Manchuria. At that time, Manchuria remained under Japanese control. Briner established a business in international trade.

=== In China ===
In 1927, Marousia Briner took her children, Yuliy and Vera (January 17, 1916 – December 13, 1967), and emigrated from Vladivostok to Harbin, China. There young Yul and Vera attended a school run by the YMCA.

In 1930, Boris gave Yuliy an acoustic guitar as a birthday present. That guitar and the music lessons that followed made a lasting impression on Brynner's artistic development. His natural curiosity, creativity, and imagination became focused on mastering guitar technique and studying classical and contemporary music. Brynner studied music under the guidance of his sister Vera, who was a classically trained opera singer. After several years of arduous studies, Brynner became an accomplished guitar player and singer.

=== In France and Switzerland ===
In 1933, fearing a war between China and Japan, Marousia Briner moved with her children to Paris. Many Russians had moved there in exile after the Revolution. There, on June 15, 1935, the fourteen-year-old Brynner made his debut at the Hermitage cabaret, where he played his guitar and sang in the Russian and Roma languages. After initial success, he continued performing at various Parisian nightclubs, sometimes accompanying his sister, and playing and singing Russian and Roma songs. At that time, Brynner was a student at a lyceum in Paris, where he studied French. His classmates and teachers were aware of his strong character, as he was often involved in fist fighting.

In the summer of 1936, Brynner worked as a lifeguard at a resort beach in Le Havre. There he joined a French circus troupe, trained as a trapeze acrobat and worked with a circus troupe for several years. After breaking his left shoulder and ribs in a fall, he left the circus troupe. In nearly unbearable pain, Brynner took narcotics for relief. He soon developed a drug dependency.

One day, while buying opium from a local dealer, Brynner met Jean Cocteau (1889–1963) and the two became lifelong friends. Cocteau introduced Brynner to Pablo Picasso, Salvador Dalí, Josephine Baker, Jean Marais, and the bohemian milieu of Paris. The experience and connections eventually helped him in his multifaceted career of acting, directing, and producing.

Seventeen-year-old Brynner realized he had become addicted to opium and the family tried to help him treat the illness. He spent a year in Lausanne, Switzerland treating his addiction at a Swiss clinic and at Lausanne University Hospital with financial support from his aunt Vera Dmitrievna Blagovidova-Briner, his mother's sister. Blagovidova-Briner was a physician trained at medical school in Saint Petersburg, Russia, before the revolution. She later practiced in China and Switzerland. The year-long treatment in Switzerland, which included hypnotherapy, had a lasting effect on Brynner's health. Yul never used illicit drugs again in his life. Later, he would become addicted to cigarettes, which damaged his lungs and ruined his health as he aged.

In Harbin, Brynner's father had a lucrative trade business and lived with his second wife, actress Katerina Ivanovna Kornakova. She gave Brynner his first professional acting lessons by showing him scenes from her repertoire at Moscow Art Theatre. She instructed him in how to respond to her lines using his voice tone and body language. During their first lessons, Katerina Kornakova demonstrated and explained to Brynner the principles of Konstantin Stanislavsky's school of acting, and the innovative ideas of Michael Chekhov. Brynner was excited and impressed with the new experience. His father initially tried to prepare his son for a management position at their family business, but changed his mind after watching several acting lessons and witnessing Brynner's happiness.

Katerina Kornakova was impressed with Brynner's intellectual and physical abilities and recommended him to study acting with her former partner Michael Chekhov. Brynner took the letter of recommendation from his stepmother and also accepted money and blessings from his father. With the generous support from both his father and stepmother, Brynner became encouraged and confident in his future success as an actor.

At the same time, Brynner's mother's illness (she had been diagnosed with leukemia) progressed and required special medical treatment that was available only in the United States. Brynner traveled with his mother on a long trip across the world.

=== In the US ===
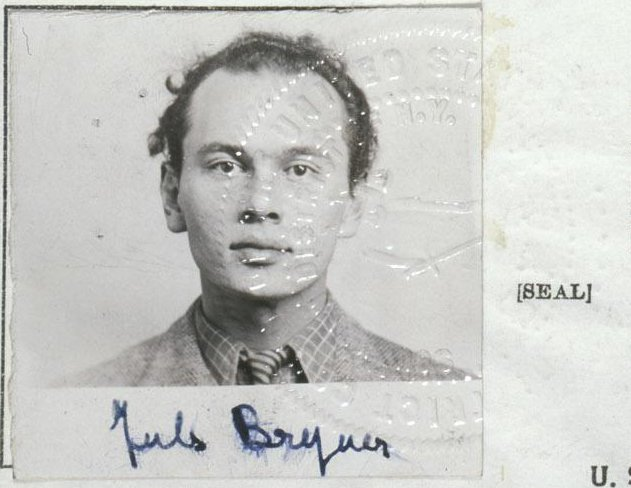
Brynner's 1943 photo after immigrating to the United States

In 1940, speaking little English, Brynner and his mother emigrated to the United States aboard the President Cleveland, departing from Kobe, Japan. They arrived in San Francisco on October 25, 1940. His final destination was New York City, where his sister already lived. Vera, a singer, starred in The Consul on Broadway in 1950. She also appeared on television in the title role of the opera Carmen. She later taught voice in New York.

During World War II Brynner worked as a French-speaking radio announcer and commentator for the US Office of War Information, broadcasting to occupied France. He also worked for the Voice of America, broadcasting in Russian to the Soviet Union. At the same time, during the war years, he studied acting in Connecticut with the Russian actor Michael Chekhov. He worked as a truck driver and stage hand for Chekhov's theatre company.

== Career ==
=== 1940s ===
Brynner made his Broadway stage debut in a production of Shakespeare's Twelfth Night that premiered on December 2, 1941. He appeared as Fabian, a character with only a few lines, as his English was limited and he had a noticeable Russian accent. The job helped him to start adding English to the list of languages he spoke, which included Russian, French, Japanese, and Hungarian. That show, along with many other Broadway productions, closed after the attack on Pearl Harbor, when the United States declared war on Japan, and Nazi Germany declared war on the United States.

Soon Brynner found a job as a radio commentator presenting war propaganda in French and Russian at the Voice of America radio station. He had little acting work during the next few years, but did co-star in a 1946 production of Lute Song with Mary Martin. He also did some modeling work and was photographed nude by George Platt Lynes.

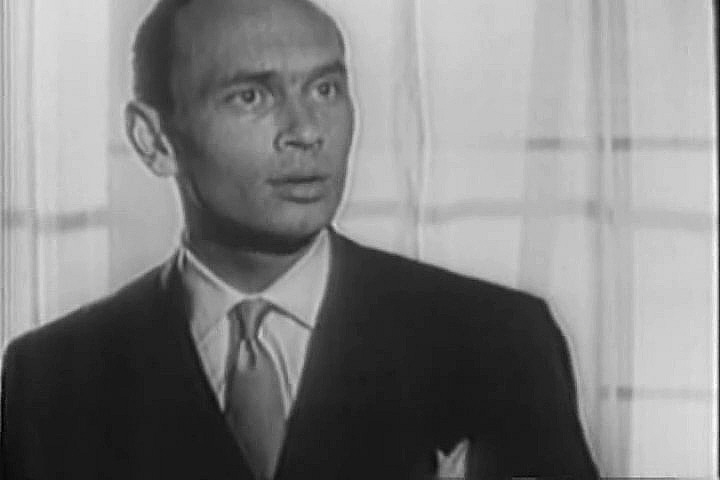
Yul Brynner as drug dealer Paul Vicola, a supporting role in Port of New York (1949)

In 1944, Brynner married actress Virginia Gilmore. Soon after, he began working as a director at the then-new CBS television studios. In 1948 and 1949, he directed and also appeared on television alongside his wife in the first two seasons of Studio One. He also appeared in other shows.

Brynner made his film debut in Port of New York, released in November 1949.

=== 1950s ===
==== The King and I ====
The next year, at the urging of Martin, Brynner auditioned for Rodgers and Hammerstein's new musical in New York. He recalled that, as he was finding success as a director on television, he was reluctant to go back on the stage. Once he read the script, however, he was fascinated by the character of the King and was eager to perform in the project.

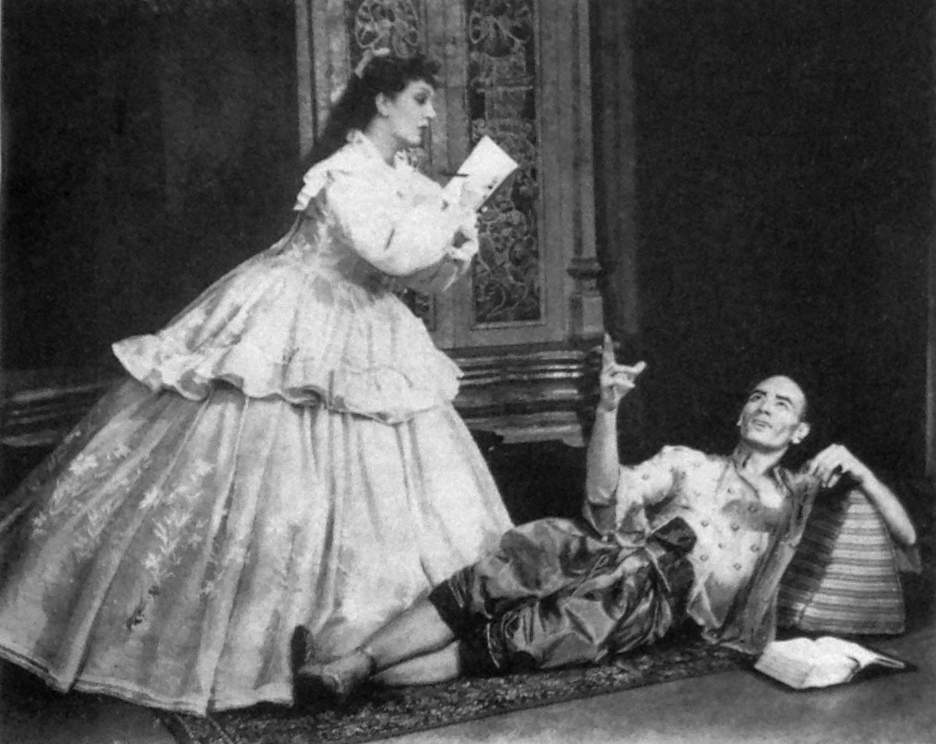
Brynner with Gertrude Lawrence in the original production of The King and I (1951)

Brynner's role as King Mongkut in The King and I (4,625 times on stage) became his best known. He appeared in the original 1951 production opposite Gertrude Lawrence and later touring productions, as well as a 1977 Broadway revival, a London production in 1979, and another Broadway revival in 1985. He won the Tony Award for Best Featured Actor in a Musical for the first of these Broadway productions and a Special Tony Award for the last.

He reprised the role in the 1956 film version, for which he won an Academy Award as Best Actor. He also played it in Anna and the King, a short-lived TV series on CBS in 1972. Brynner is one of only ten people who have won both a Tony and an Academy Award for the same role.

In 1951, Brynner shaved his head for his role in The King and I. Following the huge success of the Broadway production and subsequent film, he continued to shave his head for the rest of his life, wearing a wig when it was necessary for a role. It was unusual for a man to have a shaven head at the time, and his striking appearance helped to give him an exotic appeal. Some fans shaved off their hair to imitate him, and a shaven head was often referred to as the "Yul Brynner look".

Brynner's second motion picture was a film version of The King and I (1956) with Deborah Kerr, which was a huge success critically and commercially.

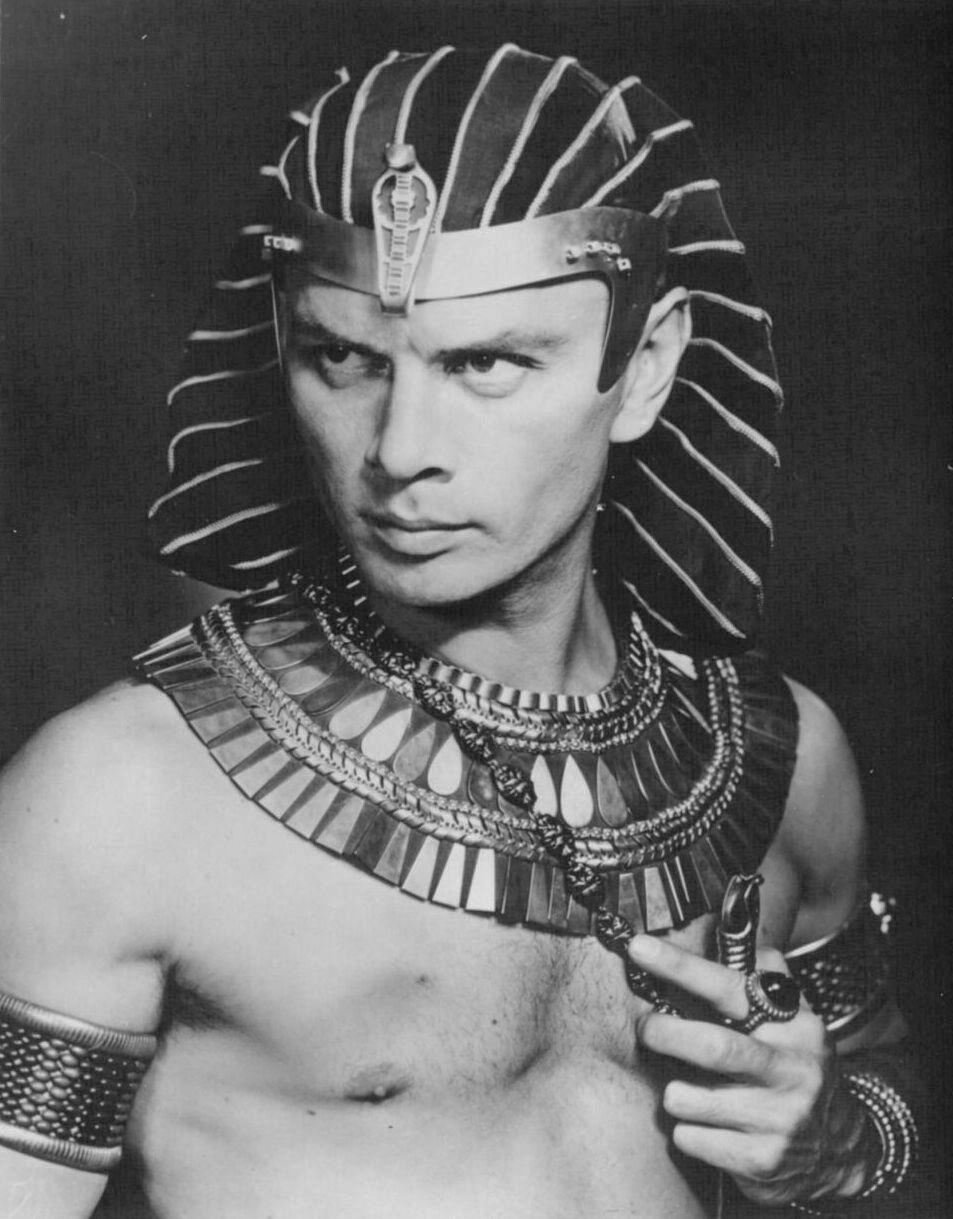
Brynner as Ramesses II in The Ten Commandments (1956)

Cecil B. de Mille hired Brynner for The Ten Commandments (1956) to play Ramesses II opposite Charlton Heston after seeing him in the stage version of The King and I, telling Brynner backstage that he was the only person for the role. He rounded out his year with Anastasia (1956), co-starring with Ingrid Bergman under the direction of Anatole Litvak. Both films were big hits and Brynner became one of the most in-demand stars in Hollywood.

MGM cast Brynner as one of The Brothers Karamazov (1958), which was another commercial success. Less so was The Buccaneer (1958), in which Brynner played Jean Lafitte; he co-starred with Heston, Inger Stevens, Claire Bloom and Charles Boyer in a historically accurate tale of the Battle of New Orleans. The film was produced by De Mille and directed by Anthony Quinn.

MGM used Brynner again in The Journey (1959), opposite Kerr under the direction of Litvak, but the film lost money. So too did The Sound and the Fury (1959) based on the novel by William Faulkner with Joanne Woodward.

Brynner then received an offer to replace Tyrone Power, who had died during the making of Solomon and Sheba (1959) with Gina Lollobrigida. The movie, a huge hit, caused the development of a planned Brynner film about Spartacus to be postponed. When the Kirk Douglas film Spartacus came out in 1960, Brynner elected not to make his own version.

=== 1960s ===
Brynner tried comedy with two films directed by Stanley Donen: Once More, with Feeling! (1960) and Surprise Package (1960), but public response was weak. He made a cameo in Testament of Orpheus.

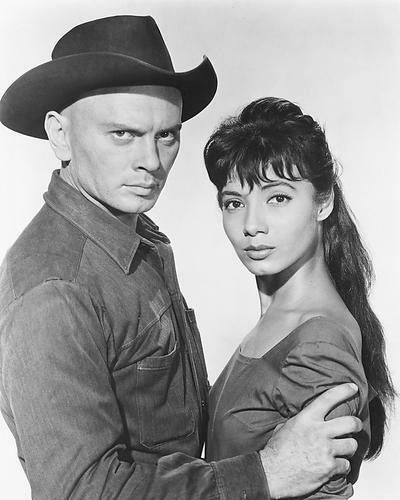
Brynner with Rosenda Monteros in The Magnificent Seven (1960)

Although the public received him well in The Magnificent Seven (1960), a Western adaptation of Seven Samurai for The Mirisch Company, the picture proved a disappointment on its initial release in the U.S. However, it was hugely popular in Europe and has had enduring popularity. Its ultimate success led to Brynner's signing a three-picture deal with the Mirisches. The film was especially popular in the Soviet Union, where it sold 67 million tickets. He then made a cameo in Goodbye Again (1961).

Brynner focused on action films. He did Escape from Zahrain (1962), with Ronald Neame as director, and Taras Bulba (1962), with Tony Curtis for J. Lee Thompson. Both films were commercial disappointments; Taras Bulba was popular but failed to recoup its large cost.

The first film under Brynner's three-picture deal with Mirisch was Flight from Ashiya (1963) with George Chakiris. It was followed by Kings of the Sun (1963), also with Chakiris, directed by Thompson. Neither film was particularly popular; nor was Invitation to a Gunfighter (1964), a western. Morituri (1965), opposite Marlon Brando, failed to reverse the series of unsuccessful movies. He had cameos in Cast a Giant Shadow (1966) and The Poppy Is Also a Flower (1966).

Brynner enjoyed a hit with Return of the Seven (1966), reprising his role from the original. Less popular were Triple Cross (1966), a war movie with Christopher Plummer; The Double Man (1967), a spy thriller; The Long Duel (1967), an Imperial adventure tale opposite Trevor Howard; Villa Rides (1968), a Western; and The File of the Golden Goose (1969).

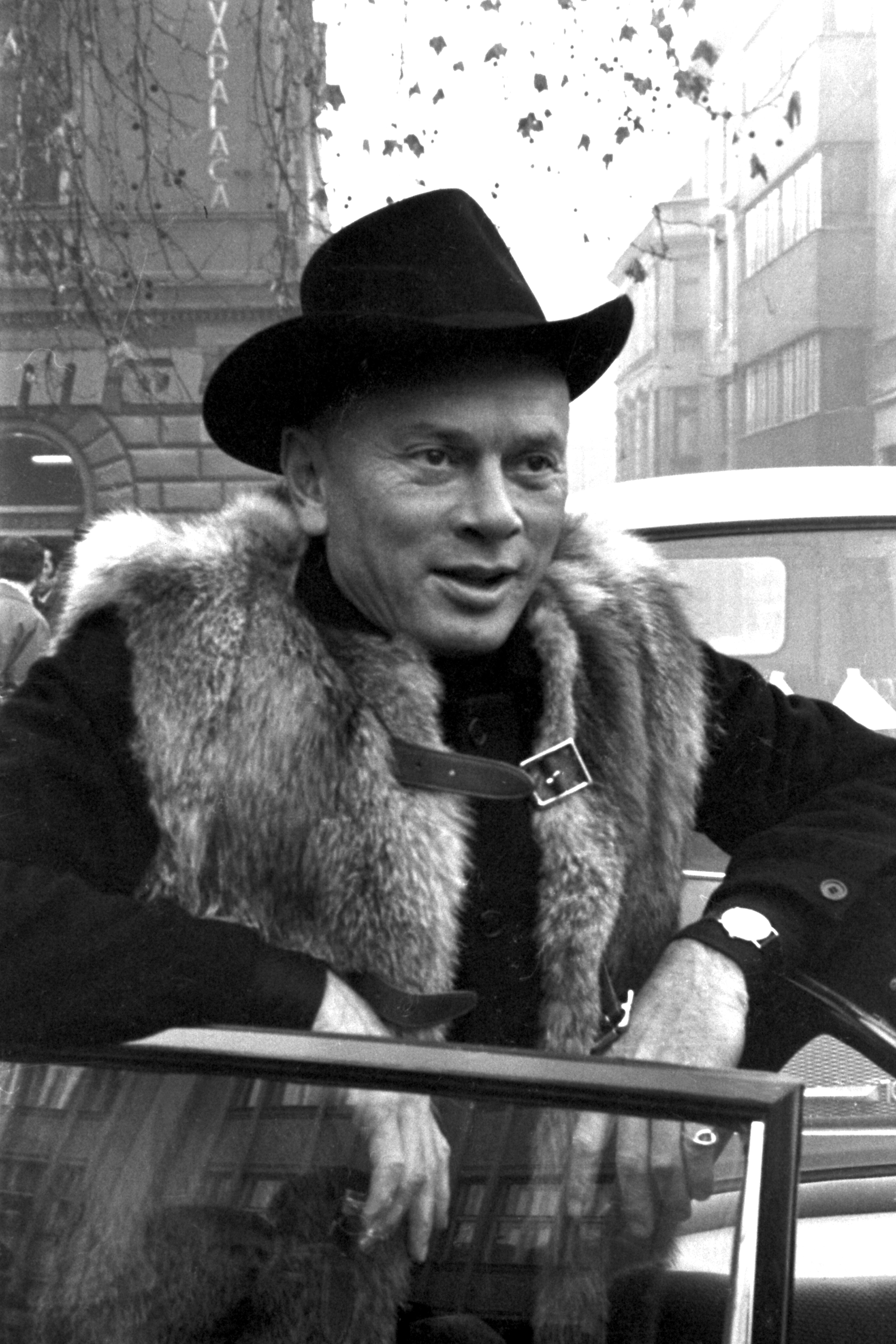
Brynner at the premiere of Battle of Neretva in Sarajevo on November 29, 1969

Brynner went to Yugoslavia to star in a war film, Battle of Neretva (1969). He supported Katharine Hepburn in the big-budget flop The Madwoman of Chaillot (1969). Brynner appeared in drag (as a torch singer) in an unbilled role in the Peter Sellers comedy The Magic Christian (1969).

=== Later career ===
Brynner went to Italy to make a spaghetti Western, Adiós, Sabata (1970) and supported Kirk Douglas in The Light at the Edge of the World (1971). He remained in lead roles for Romance of a Horsethief (1971) and a Western, Catlow (1971).

Brynner had a small role in Fuzz (1972) then reprised his most famous part in the TV series Anna and the King (1972) which ran for 13 episodes.

After Night Flight from Moscow (1973) in Europe, Brynner created one of his iconic roles in the cult hit film Westworld (1973) as the 'Gunslinger', a killer robot. His next two films were variations on this performance: The Ultimate Warrior (1975) and Futureworld (1976).

Brynner returned to Broadway in Home Sweet Homer, a notorious flop musical. His final movie was Death Rage (1976), an Italian action film.

== Personal life ==
Brynner became a naturalized U.S. citizen, aged 22, in 1943, while living in New York as an actor and radio announcer. By the 1960s, Brynner had avoided paying income tax as an American living abroad in Switzerland but lost that tax exemption due to large amounts of time working in the United States. To avoid paying the Internal Revenue Service nearly $2 million in back taxes and penalties, he was advised by his accountants to renounce his American citizenship, which he did at the U.S. Embassy in Bern, Switzerland, in June 1965. In the early 1980s, he embraced Buddhism and regarded himself as a Buddhist.

Yul Brynner was married four times and had five children. His first wife (1944–1960) was American actress Virginia Gilmore (1919–1986), with whom he had a son, Yul (better known as Rock) Brynner Jr. (1946–2023), a historian, novelist, and lecturer. His second wife (1960–1967) was Chilean model Doris Kleiner (1931–2025), with whom he had a daughter, Victoria Brynner (born 1962), a businesswoman and consultant in the fashion and luxury industry and founder of Stardust Brands. His third wife (1971–1981) was French noblewoman and socialite Jacqueline Thion de la Chaume (1932–2013), with whom he adopted two Vietnamese children, Mia and Melody Brynner, in 1974 and 1975. Yul also adopted another daughter, Lark Brynner (born 1958 or 1959), who was born to him out of wedlock by Frankie Tilden (born 1939). His fourth wife (1983–1985) was the much younger ballerina Kathy Lee (born 1957). They had no children together.

In 2006, Brynner's son, Rock, wrote a book about his father and his family history titled Empire and Odyssey: The Brynners in Far East Russia and Beyond. He regularly returned to Vladivostok, the city of his father's birth, for the Pacific Meridian Film Festival.

His first name "Yul" was handed down from his ancestors. Its meaning in Mongolian is "beyond the hills," or "beyond the horizon... what we can't see."

=== Health ===
In 1979, Brynner settled out of court after allegedly contracting trichinosis at Trader Vic's in New York City.

In September 1983, Brynner suffered a sore throat, his voice changed and doctors found a lump on his vocal cords. In Los Angeles, only hours before his 4,000th performance in The King and I, he received the test results, which indicated that he had inoperable lung cancer, though his throat was not affected. Brynner had begun smoking heavily at age 12. Although he had quit in 1971, the damage had already been done. Also, his promotional photos often still showed him with a cigarette in hand, or a cigar in his mouth. He and the national tour of the musical were forced to take a few months off while he underwent radiation therapy, which damaged his throat and made singing and speaking difficult. The tour then resumed.

In January 1985, the tour reached New York for a farewell Broadway run. Aware he was dying, Brynner gave an interview on Good Morning America discussing the dangers of smoking and expressing his desire to make an anti-smoking commercial. The Broadway production of The King and I ran from January 7 to June 30 of that year. His last performance, a few months before his death, marked the 4,625th time he had played the role of the King.

=== Other interests ===
In addition to his work as a director and performer, Brynner was an active photographer and wrote two books. His daughter Victoria put together Yul Brynner: Photographer, a collection of his photographs of family, friends, and fellow actors, as well as those he took while serving as a UN special consultant on refugees.

Brynner wrote Bring Forth the Children: A Journey to the Forgotten People of Europe and the Middle East (1960), with photographs by himself and Magnum photographer Inge Morath, and The Yul Brynner Cookbook: Food Fit for the King and You (1983).

He enjoyed singing gypsy songs. In 1967, he and Aliosha Dimitrievitch released a record album The Gypsy and I: Yul Brynner Sings Gypsy Songs (Vanguard VSD 79265).

=== Relationships and marriages ===
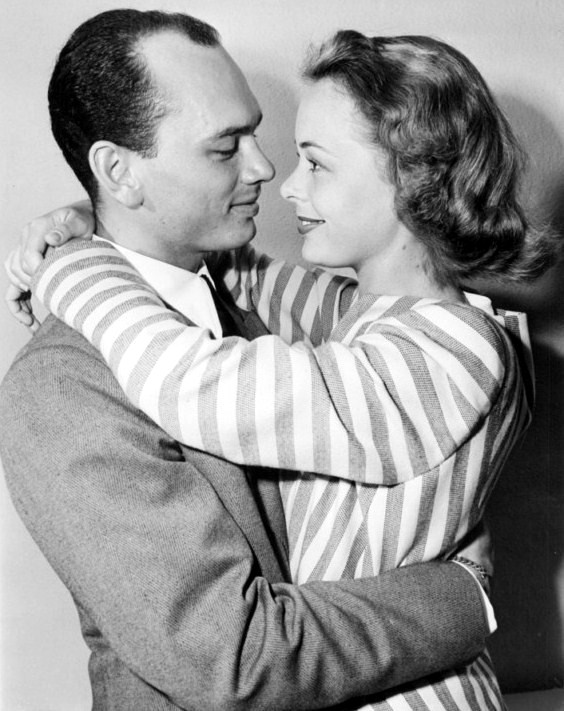
Brynner and Virginia Gilmore in 1944

Brynner married four times, his first three marriages ending in divorce. He fathered three children and adopted two. His first wife (1944–1960) was actress Virginia Gilmore with whom he had one child, Yul "Rock" Brynner (1946–2023), nicknamed "Rock" when he was six years old in honor of boxer Rocky Graziano. Rock was a historian, novelist, and university history lecturer at Marist College in Poughkeepsie, New York and Western Connecticut State University in Danbury, Connecticut.

Yul Brynner had a long affair with Marlene Dietrich, who was 19 years his senior, beginning during the first production of The King and I.

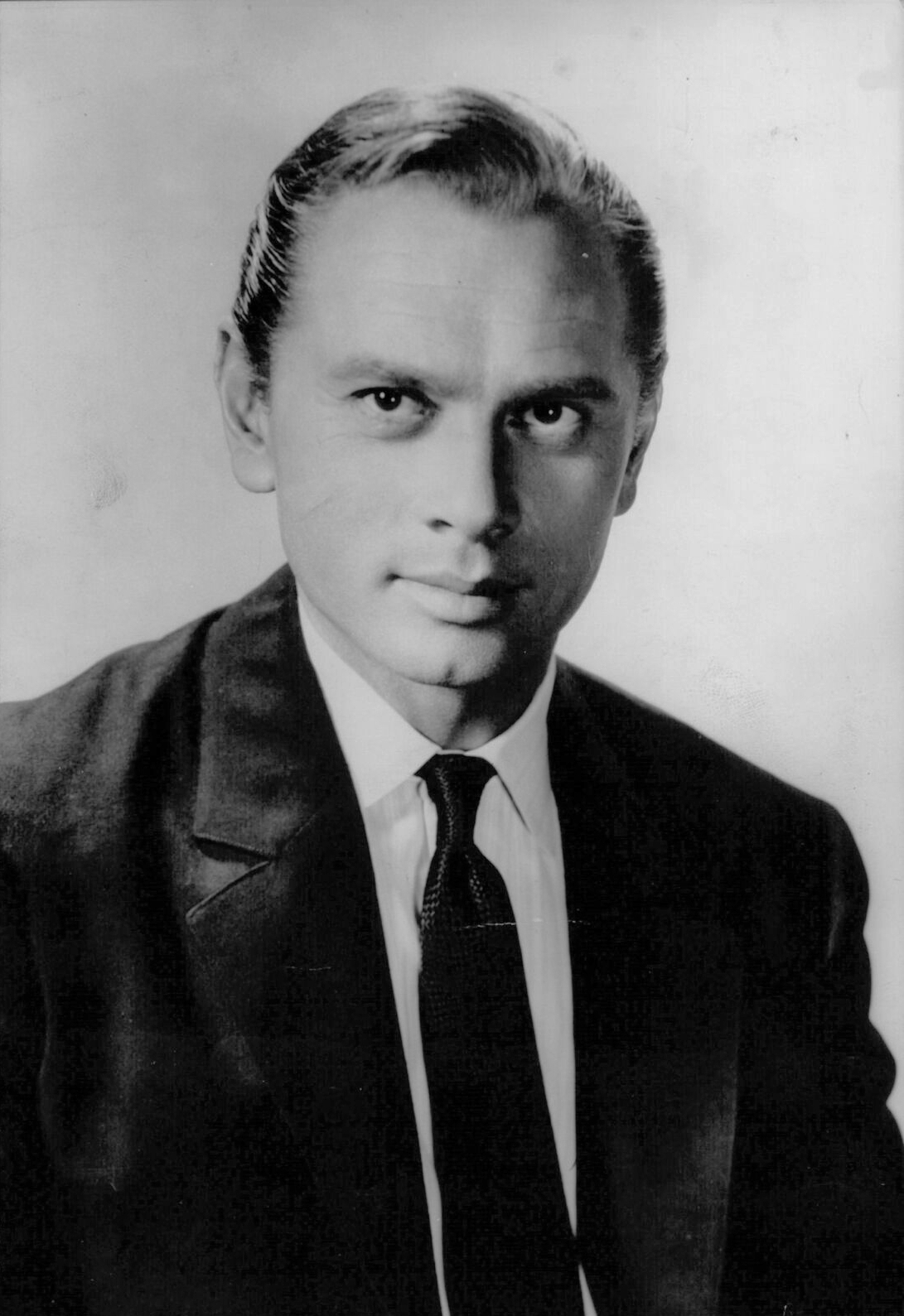
Brynner in 1959

In 1959, Brynner fathered a daughter, Lark Brynner, with Frankie Tilden, who was 20 years old. Lark lived with her mother and Brynner supported her financially. His second wife, from 1960 to 1967, Doris Kleiner (1931–2025) was a Chilean model whom he married on the set during shooting of The Magnificent Seven in 1960. They had one child, Victoria Brynner (born November 1962), whose godmother was Audrey Hepburn. Belgian novelist and artist Monique Watteau was also romantically linked with Brynner, from 1961 to 1967.

His third wife (1971–1981), Jacqueline Simone Thion de la Chaume (1932–2013), a French socialite, was the widow of Philippe de Croisset (son of French playwright Francis de Croisset and a publishing executive). Brynner and Jacqueline adopted two Vietnamese children: Mia (1974) and Melody (1975). The first house Brynner owned was the Manoir de Criquebœuf, a 16th-century manor house in northwestern France that Jacqueline and he purchased. His third marriage broke up, reportedly owing to his 1980 announcement that he would continue in the role of the King for another long tour and Broadway run, as well as his affairs with female fans and his neglect of his wife and children.

On April 4, 1983, aged 62, Brynner married his fourth wife, Kathy Lee (born 1957), a 26-year-old ballerina from Ipoh, Malaysia, whom he had met in the London production of The King and I. They remained married for the last two years of his life.

== Death ==
Brynner died of lung cancer on October 10, 1985, at New York Hospital at the age of 65. His remains were cremated and the ashes were buried in the grounds of the Saint-Michel-de-Bois-Aubry Orthodox monastery, near Luzé, between Tours and Poitiers in France.

=== Anti-smoking campaign ===
Prior to his death, with the help of the American Cancer Society, Brynner created a public service announcement using a clip from the Good Morning America interview. A few days after his death, it premiered on all major US television networks and in other countries. Brynner used the announcement to express his desire to make an anti-smoking commercial after discovering he had cancer, and his death was imminent. He then looked directly into the camera for 30 seconds and said, "Now that I'm gone, I tell you: Don't smoke. Whatever you do, just don't smoke. If I could take back that smoking, we wouldn't be talking about any cancer. I'm convinced of that." His year of birth, in one version of the commercial, was incorrectly given as 1915.

== Legacy ==
=== In Russia ===
Statue of Brynner in front of his birthplace in Vladivostok

Yul Brynner Family Mansion

General information
- Location: Vladivostok, Russia
- Coordinates: 43.1142°N 131.8812°E

On September 28, 2012, a 2.4-m-tall statue was inaugurated at Yul Brynner Park, in front of the home where Brynner was born at Aleutskaya St. No. 15 in Vladivostok, Russia. Created by local sculptor Alexei Bokiy, the monument was carved in granite monolith that was acquired in China and delivered to Vladivostok, Russia. It depicts him in the role of King Mongkut of Siam from The King and I. The grounds for the park were donated by the city of Vladivostok, which also paid additional costs. Vladivostok Mayor Igor Pushkariov, US Consul General Sylvia Curran, and Brynner's son, Rock, participated in the ceremony, along with hundreds of local residents.

The Briner family cottage in suburban Vladivostok is now a Yul Brynner museum.

=== In the U.S. ===
In 1956, Brynner imprinted his hands and feet into the concrete pavement in front of Grauman's Chinese Theatre in Hollywood, California. In 1960, Brynner was honored with a star on the Hollywood Walk of Fame at 6162 Hollywood Boulevard.

In 2022, a podcast was launched celebrating his filmography, entitled "Here's Looking at Yul, Kid," and has included guests such as Ron Howard.

=== In France ===
Brynner spent many years living, studying, and working in France, and his last will stated his wish to be buried there. His resting place at Abbaye royale Saint-Michel de Bois-Aubry has a memorial mention dedicated to him.

=== In Japan ===
The Japanese dubbing of his voice in various movies was handled by Osamu Kobayashi and others.

== Acting credits ==
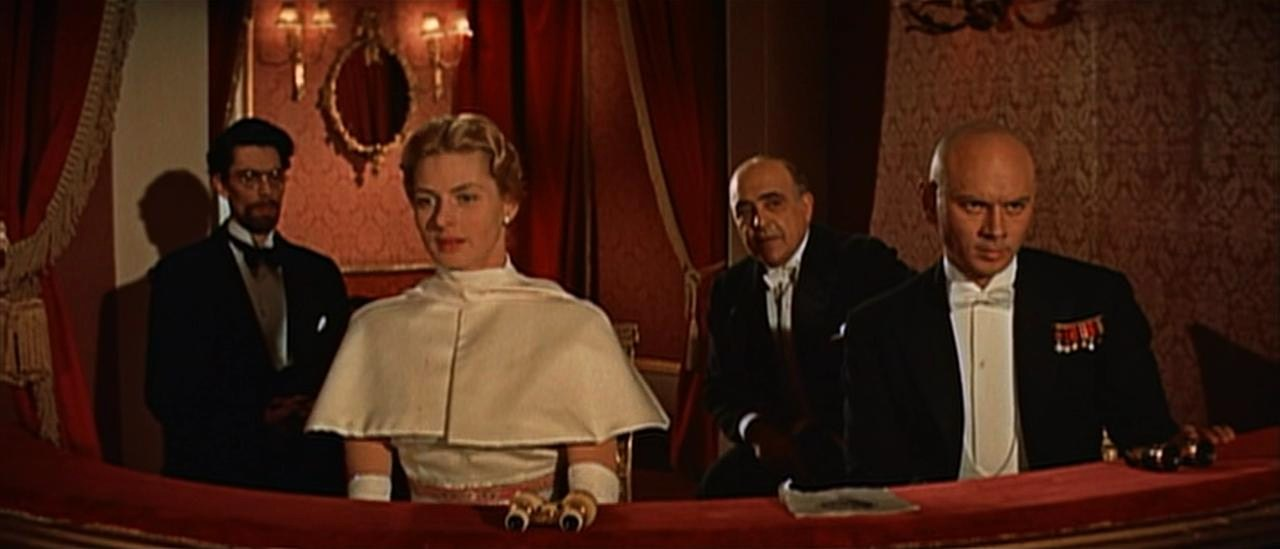
With Ingrid Bergman in Anastasia (1956)

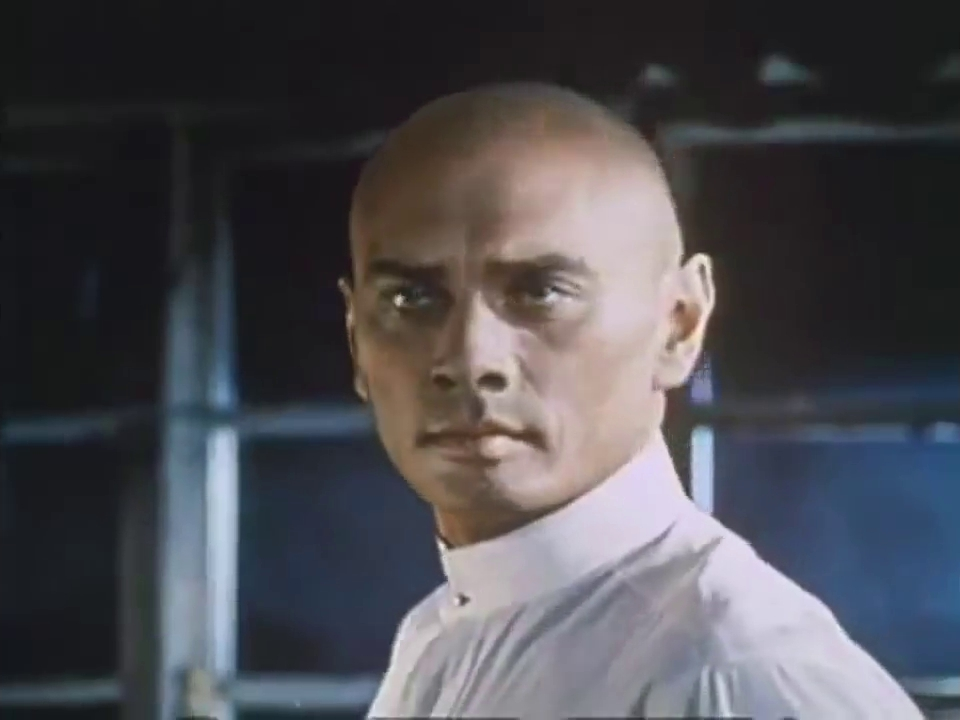
in The Brothers Karamazov (1958)

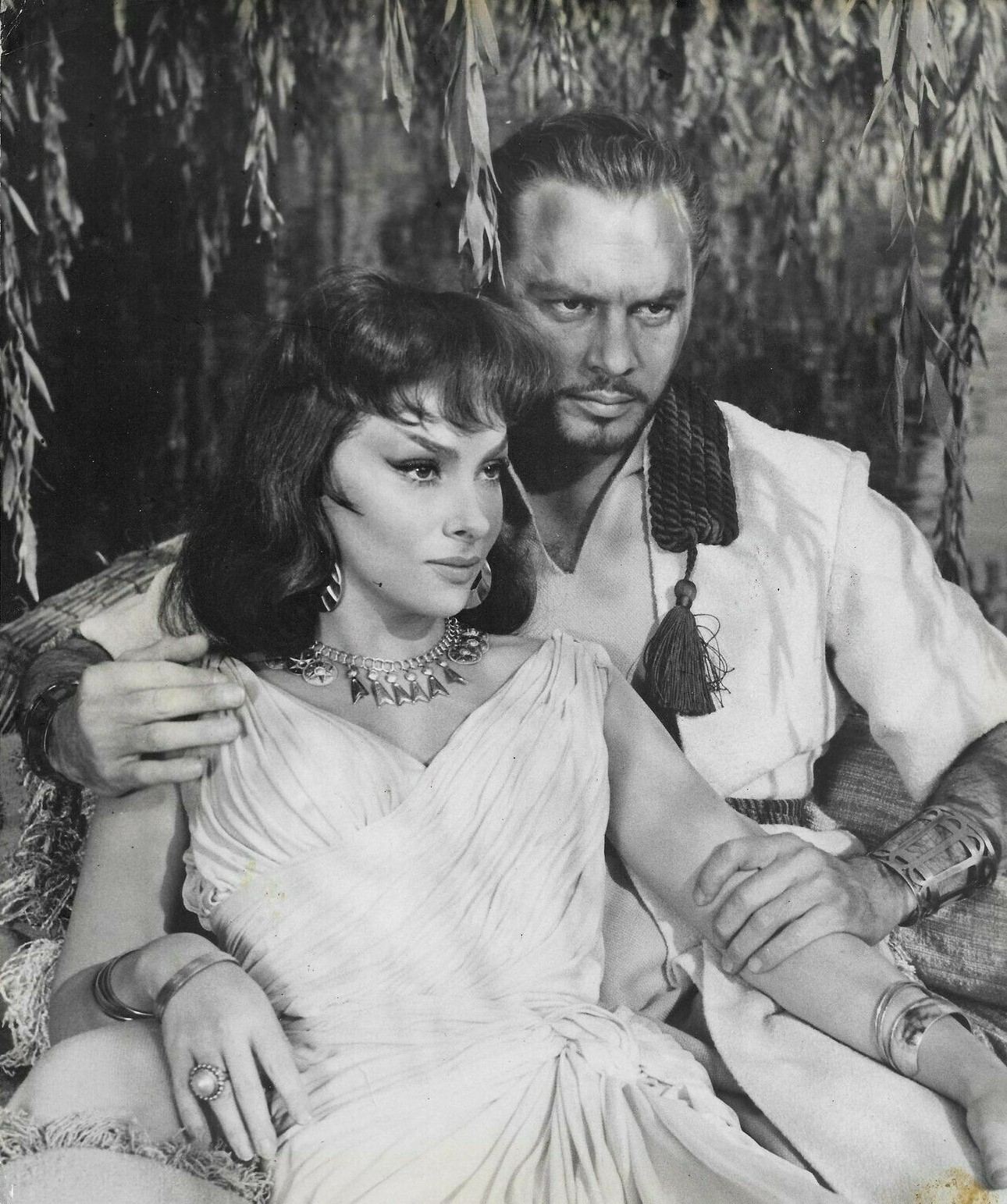
With Gina Lollobrigida in Solomon and Sheba (1959)

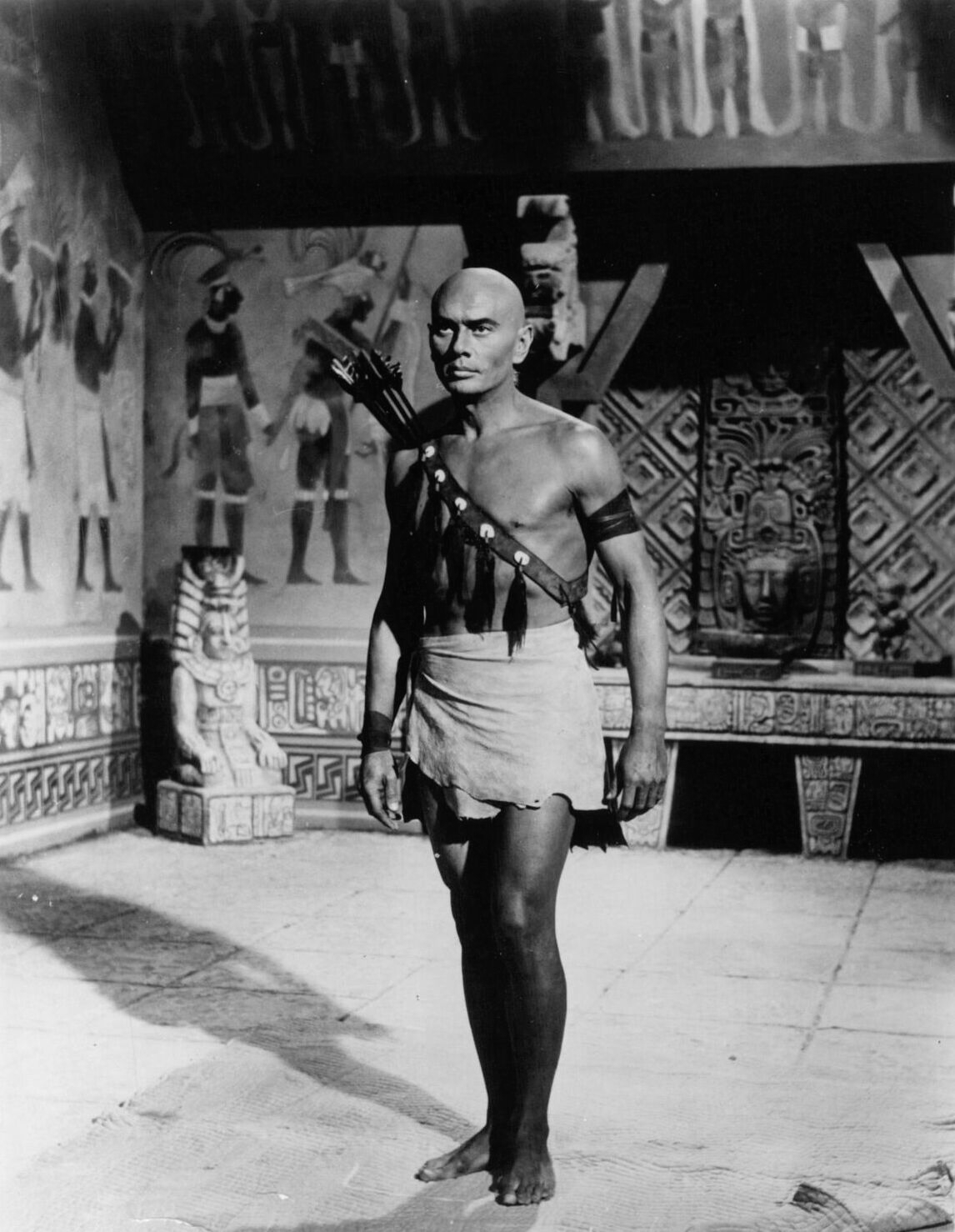
In Kings of the Sun (1963)

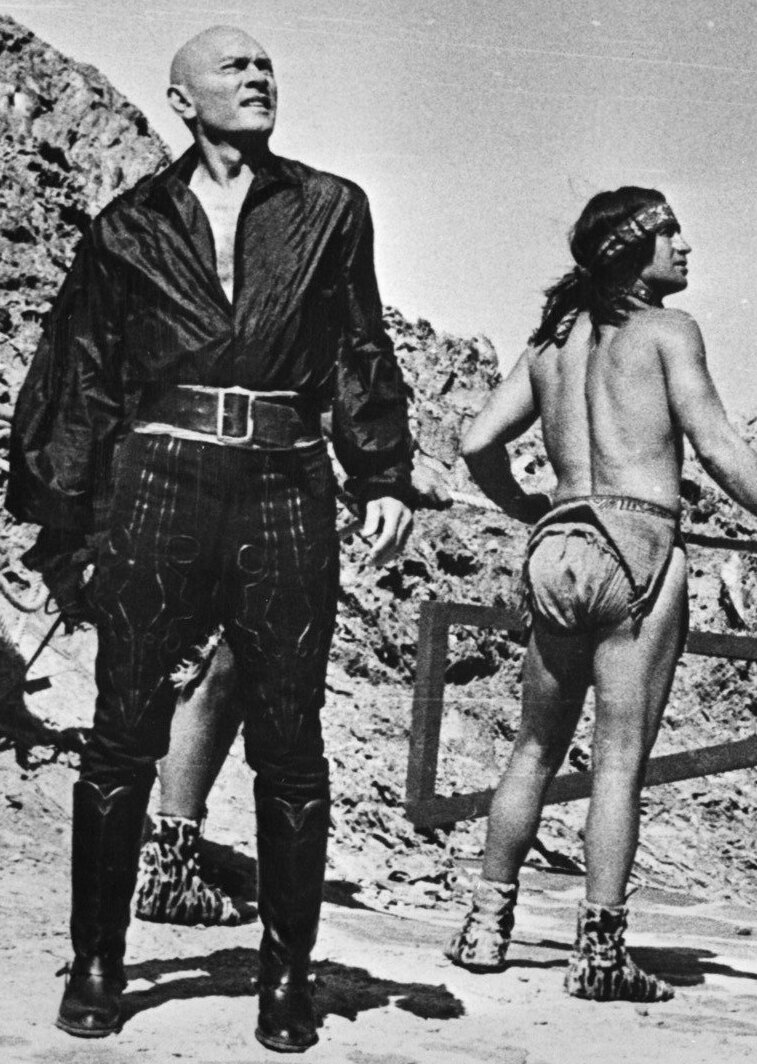
In The Light at the Edge of the World (1971)

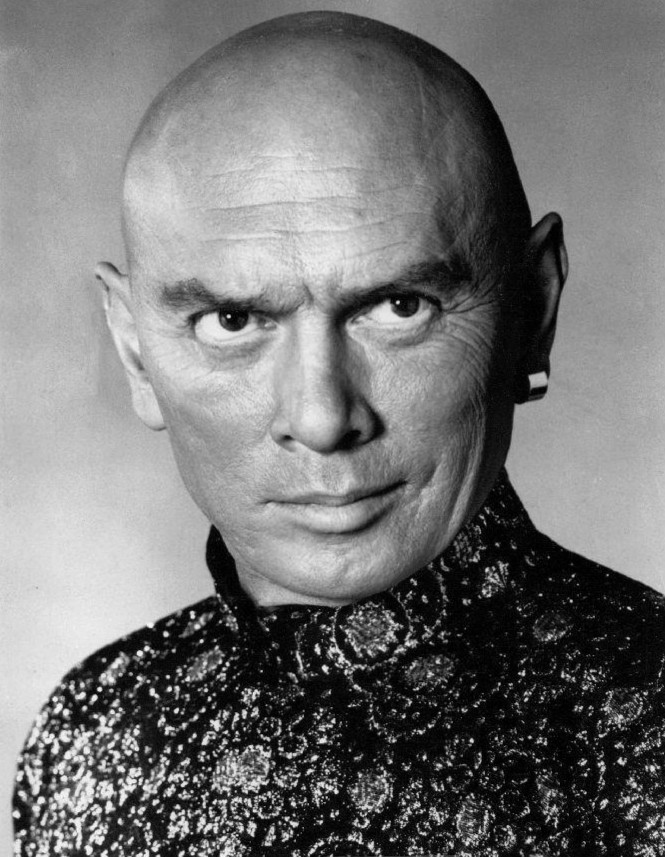
In Anna and the King (1972)

| Year | Title | Role | Notes |
|---|---|---|---|
| 1949 | Port of New York | Paul Vicola | |
| 1956 | The King and I | King Mongkut of Siam | Academy Award for Best Actor; National Board of Review Award for Best Actor (also for Anastasia and The Ten Commandments); Nominated—Golden Globe Award for Best Actor in a Motion Picture – Musical or Comedy; Nominated—New York Film Critics Circle Award for Best Actor |
| 1956 | The Ten Commandments | Ramesses | National Board of Review Award for Best Actor (also for The King and I and Anastasia) |
| 1956 | Anastasia | General Sergei Pavlovich Bounine | National Board of Review Award for Best Actor (also for The King and I and The Ten Commandments) |
| 1958 | The Brothers Karamazov | Dmitri Karamazov | |
| 1958 | The Buccaneer | Jean Lafitte | |
| 1959 | The Journey | Russian Major Surov | |
| 1959 | The Sound and the Fury | Jason Compson | |
| 1959 | Solomon and Sheba | Solomon | |
| 1960 | Once More, with Feeling! | Victor Fabian | |
| 1960 | Testament of Orpheus | L'huissier / Court usher | Uncredited |
| 1960 | Surprise Package | Nico March | |
| 1960 | The Magnificent Seven | Chris Larabee Adams | Nominated—Laurel Award for Top Action Performance |
| 1961 | Goodbye Again | Extra in nightclub scene | Uncredited |
| 1962 | Escape from Zahrain | Sharif | |
| 1962 | Taras Bulba | Taras Bulba | |
| 1963 | Kings of the Sun | Chief Black Eagle | |
| 1964 | Flight from Ashiya | Sgt. Mike Takashima | |
| 1964 | Invitation to a Gunfighter | Jules Gaspard d'Estaing | |
| 1965 | Morituri | Captain Mueller | |
| 1966 | Cast a Giant Shadow | Asher Gonen | |
| 1966 | The Poppy Is Also a Flower | Colonel Salem | (also titled Danger Grows Wild) |
| 1966 | Return of the Seven | Chris Adams | |
| 1966 | Triple Cross | Baron Von Grunen | |
| 1967 | The Double Man | Dan Slater / Kalmer | |
| 1967 | The Long Duel | Sultan | |
| 1968 | Villa Rides | Pancho Villa | |
| 1969 | The File of the Golden Goose | Peter Novak | |
| 1969 | Battle of Neretva | Vlado (Vladimir Smirnov) | |
| 1969 | The Madwoman of Chaillot | The chairman | |
| 1969 | The Magic Christian | Transvestite Cabaret Singer | Uncredited |
| 1970 | Adiós, Sabata | Sabata / Indio Black | |
| 1971 | The Light at the Edge of the World | Jonathan Kongre | |
| 1971 | Romance of a Horsethief | Captain Stoloff | |
| 1971 | Catlow | Catlow | |
| 1972 | Fuzz | The Deaf Man | |
| 1972 | Anna and the King | King Mongkut of Siam | TV series, 13 episodes |
| 1973 | Night Flight from Moscow | Col. Alexei Vlassov | aka The Serpent |
| 1973 | Westworld | The Gunslinger | |
| 1975 | The Ultimate Warrior | Carson | |
| 1976 | Futureworld | The Gunslinger | |
| 1976 | Death Rage | Peter Marciani | Final film role |

Short subjects:

- On Location with Westworld (1973)
- Lost to the Revolution (1980) (narrator)

=== Box office ranking ===
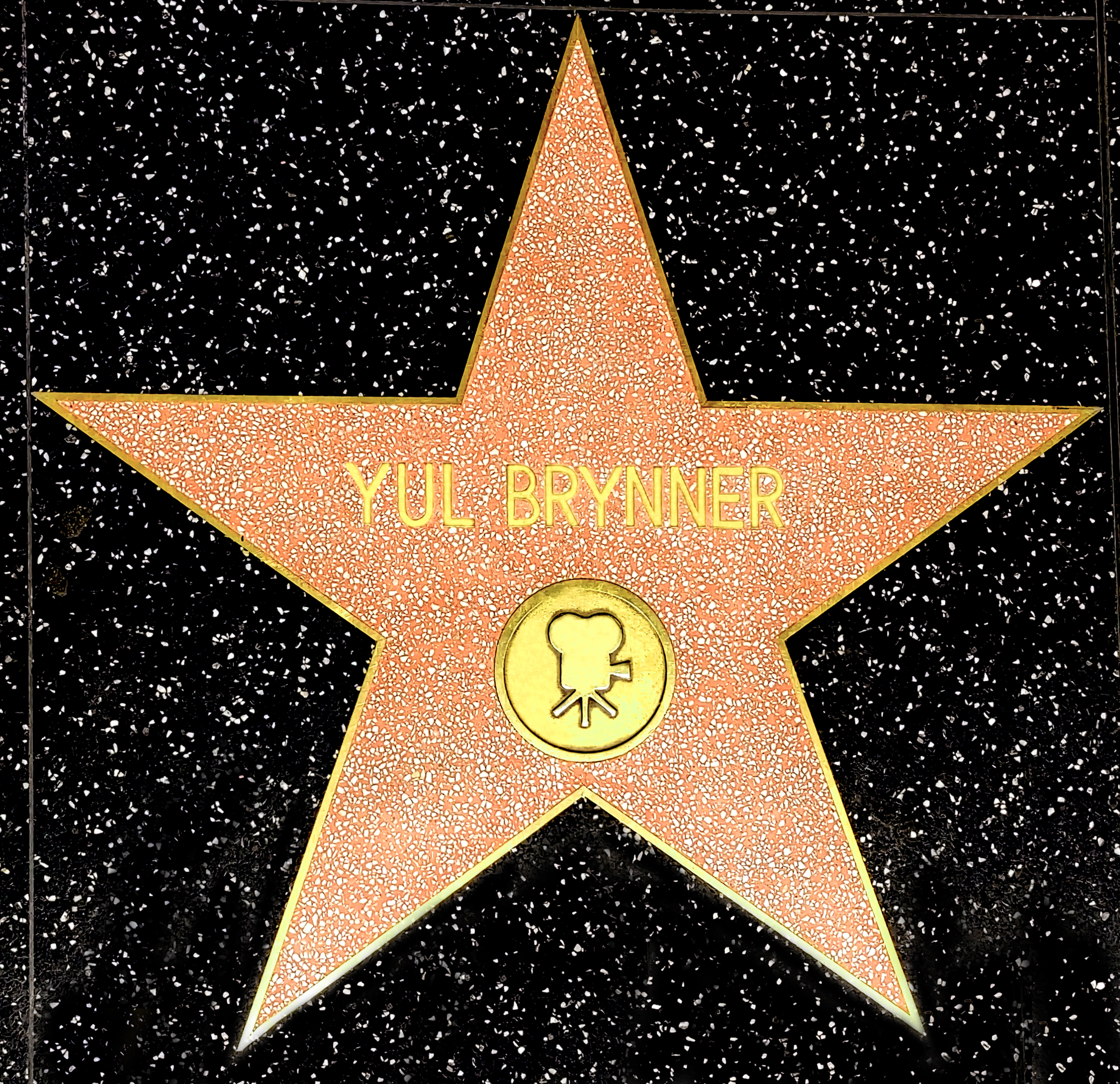
Yul Brynner star on the Hollywood Walk of Fame at 6162 Hollywood Boulevard

At the height of his career, Brynner was voted by exhibitors as among the most popular stars at the box office:

- 1956 – 21st (US)
- 1957 – 10th (US), 10th (UK)
- 1958 – 8th (US)
- 1959 – 24th (US)
- 1960 – 23rd (US)

=== Select stage work ===
- Twelfth Night (1941) (Broadway)
- The Moon Vine (1943) (Broadway)
- Lute Song (1946) (Broadway and US national tour)
- The King and I (1951) (Broadway and US national tour)
- Home Sweet Homer (1976) (Broadway)
- The King and I (1977) (Broadway, London and US national tour)
- The King and I (1985) (Broadway)

== Awards and nominations ==
| Year | Award | Category | Nominated work | Results | Ref. |
|---|---|---|---|---|---|
| 1956 | Academy Awards | Best Actor | The King and I | Won | |
| 1977 | Drama Desk Awards | Outstanding Actor in a Musical | The King and I | Nominated | |
| 1956 | Golden Globe Awards | Best Actor in a Motion Picture – Musical or Comedy | The King and I | Nominated | |
| 1956 | National Board of Review Awards | Best Actor | Anastasia / The King and I / The Ten Commandments | Won | |
| 1956 | New York Film Critics Circle Awards | Best Actor | Anastasia / The King and I / The Ten Commandments | Nominated | |
| 1952 | Tony Awards | Distinguished Supporting or Featured Musical Actor | The King and I | Won | |
| 1985 | Tony Awards | Special Tony Award | | Won | |

- In 1960, he was inducted into the Hollywood Walk of Fame with a motion pictures star at 6162 Hollywood Boulevard.

== See also ==
- List of Russian Americans
- List of Academy Award winners and nominees from Russia
- List of actors with Academy Award nominations
