= Trax Colton =

American actor (1929–2025)

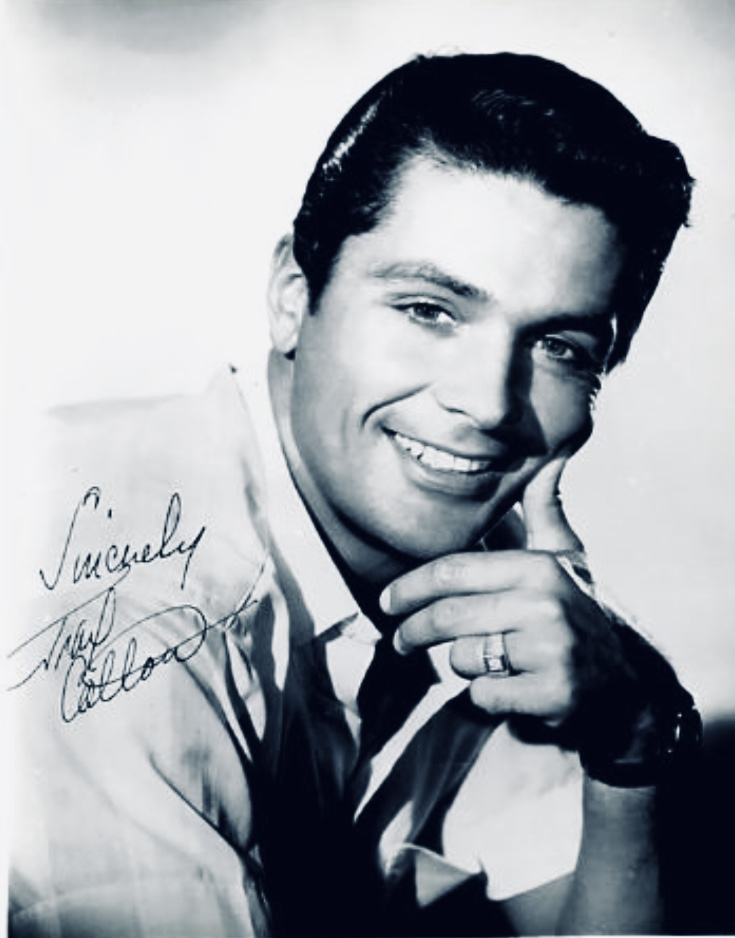
- Born: Louis A. Morelli; May 26, 1929; Highland Park, New Jersey, U.S.
- Died: August 30, 2025 (aged 96); Monte Nido, California, U.S.
- Occupation: Actor
- Years active: 1960–1962

One afternoon last year, a young actor named Louis Morelli walked into an office in Hollywood. When he walked out, his name was Trax Colton. No one had ever heard of him before, and no one has heard of him since.

— Time magazine on 23 March 1962

A lad billed as Trax Colton may be our next matinee idol.

— Dorothy Kilgallen on 22 March 1961

Louis A. Morelli (May 26, 1929 – August 30, 2025), known professionally as Trax Colton, was an American film actor who appeared in two features as a contract player for 20th Century Fox between 1960 and 1962.

== Life and career ==
Colton was born in Highland Park, New Jersey on May 26, 1929, to Catherine De Angelis and Angelo Morelli, both of Italy. He had a sister, Martha Morelli. He was working as a used car salesman when he was discovered by Henry Willson, a Hollywood talent agent who had discovered Rock Hudson, Tab Hunter, Clint Walker, and Rory Calhoun, who changed his name to Trax Colton.

Colton signed an exclusive contract with 20th Century Fox in 1960 and was given a small part in the film adaptation of The Marriage-Go-Round (1961), starring Susan Hayward and James Mason. Soon thereafter, he was given a lead role in It Happened in Athens, a comedy plotting the adventures surrounding a winner at the first modern Olympic games in 1896. He played Spiridon Loues, a Greek shepherd who enters the Olympics as a runner. It co-starred sex symbol Jayne Mansfield, whom Colton had a brief affair with during filming. After the picture wrapped, Hollywood columnist Mike Connolly said in a 1961 column that Colton was Fox Studios' new "combination Rudolph Valentino–Ty Power". In March 1961 Dorothy Kilgallen wrote that "his only other screen credit to date was a tiny role in Marriage-Go-Round but the female reaction around the nation was enough to give him a bigger chance" and speculated that Colton "may be our next matinee idol".

In November 1961, he screen tested for a film entitled Celebration for the part of a man who convinces Joanne Woodward to perform in a pornographic film. Celebration had been the film's working title, it was eventually produced in 1963 as The Stripper with Robert Webber in the role.

It Happened in Athens was released in 1962, but by that time, Colton had been released from his studio contract and stopped making movies.

Colton died in Monte Nido, California on August 30, 2025, at the age of 96.

== Filmography ==
Year	Title	Role	Notes
1961	The Marriage-Go-Round	Crew Cut / Party Guest	
1962	It Happened in Athens	Spiridon Loues	(final film role)
