= Nico Minardos =

Greek-American actor

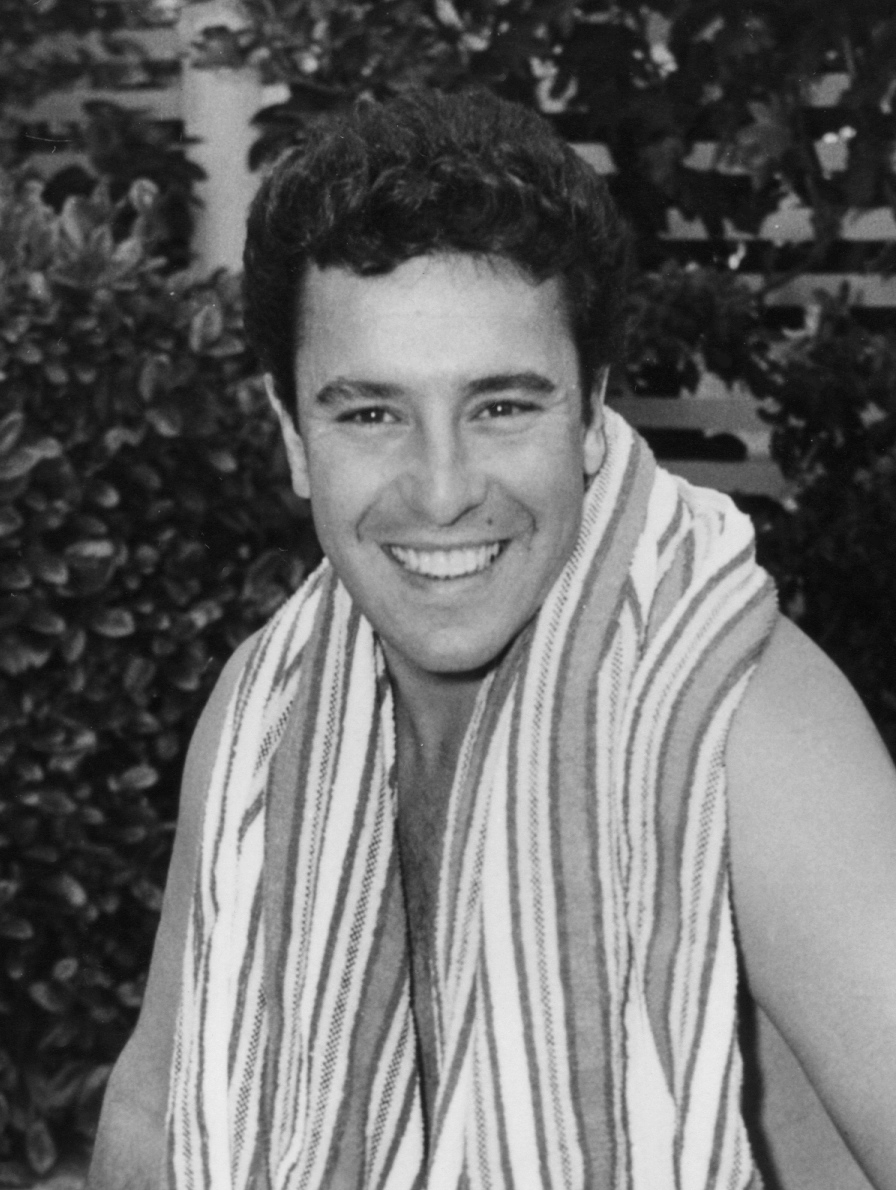
- Born: Nicholas Minardos; February 15, 1930; Pangrati, Athens, Greece
- Died: August 27, 2011 (aged 81); Woodland Hills, Los Angeles, California, U.S.
- Occupation: Actor
- Spouse(s): Deborah Jean Smith (divorced) Julie Minardos (m. 1965)
- Children: 2

Nicholas Minardos (February 15, 1930, Pangrati, Athens – August 27, 2011, Woodland Hills, Los Angeles) was a Greek-American actor.

== Work in Hollywood ==
His first Hollywood screen appearance was as an extra in the 1952 film Monkey Business. His film credits also include Holiday for Lovers; Twelve Hours to Kill; It Happened in Athens; and Cannon for Cordoba.

The majority of Minardos's work was in television, where he made guest appearances in a wide variety of shows. Due to his dark looks and accent, he was often cast as a Mexican. He appeared in "Have Gun Will Travel" S2 E19 "The Monster" as Carlos (1960). He played a thief in the Maverick episode, "The Judas Mask"; a doctor in The Twilight Zone episode "The Gift"; and two roles in the TV show Alias Smith and Jones, first as a bandit chief in "Journey from San Juan", and then as the Alcalde of a Mexican resort town in "Miracle at Santa Marta". These latter two appearances reunited him with Cannon for Cordoba co-star, Pete Duel, who played Hannibal Heyes, the alias Smith of the title. He was cast as an Italian, Giangiacomo, in the 1965 Perry Mason episode "The Case of the Sad Sicilian". Minardos also appeared in an episode of Barnaby Jones titled "The Loose Connection" (1973).

In 1975, Minardos starred in and produced Assault on Agathon based on the book by Alan Caillou. It is the story of a revolutionary from World War II, the mysterious Agathon, who is committing terrorist acts in Greece and Albania. Minardos stars as Cabot Cain, a Western agent assigned to stop Agathon and locate a missing Interpol agent. Minardos obtained financing for the film from Kjell Qvale, a Bay Area-based automotive entrepreneur who was then the majority shareholder in Jensen Motors. Minardos had approached Qvale for a product placement deal to use a Jensen Interceptor during filming but ultimately convinced Qvale to finance the entire movie. MGM distributed the film but it was a financial failure. Minardos's last appearance on the screen was in an episode of The A-Team in 1983.

== Personal life ==
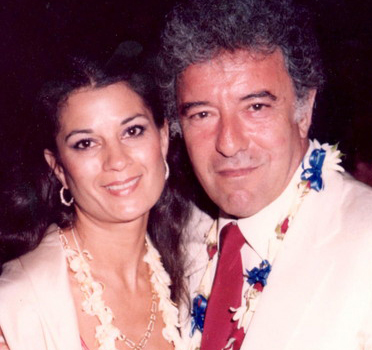
Julie and Nico Minardos

Nicholas Minardos was born in Greece and emigrated to the United States permanently in 1954; he became a naturalized citizen in 1960. Minardos was married twice, first briefly in the mid-1950s to the former Deborah Jean Smith (sometimes incorrectly referred to as Deborah Ann Montgomery). There were no children from that marriage. Two years after the divorce, Deborah married the legendary actor Tyrone Power, and after he died, producer Arthur Loew Jr. Minardos remarried in 1965. He and his wife Julie had two children together, a son named George and a daughter named Nina. Minardos reputedly lived with the actress Marilyn Monroe in the 1950s and with the actress/dancer Juliet Prowse.

== Notable events ==
On September 28, 1966, Minardos, who was co-starring with actor Eric Fleming in an MGM-TV movie filming on location in Peru to be titled Selva Alta (High Jungle), was involved in a canoeing mishap on the Huallaga River in which Fleming drowned. Minardos, a strong swimmer, was unable to rescue Fleming from the rapids and only barely survived himself. Fleming's body was swept away in the turbulent waters and was only found three days later.

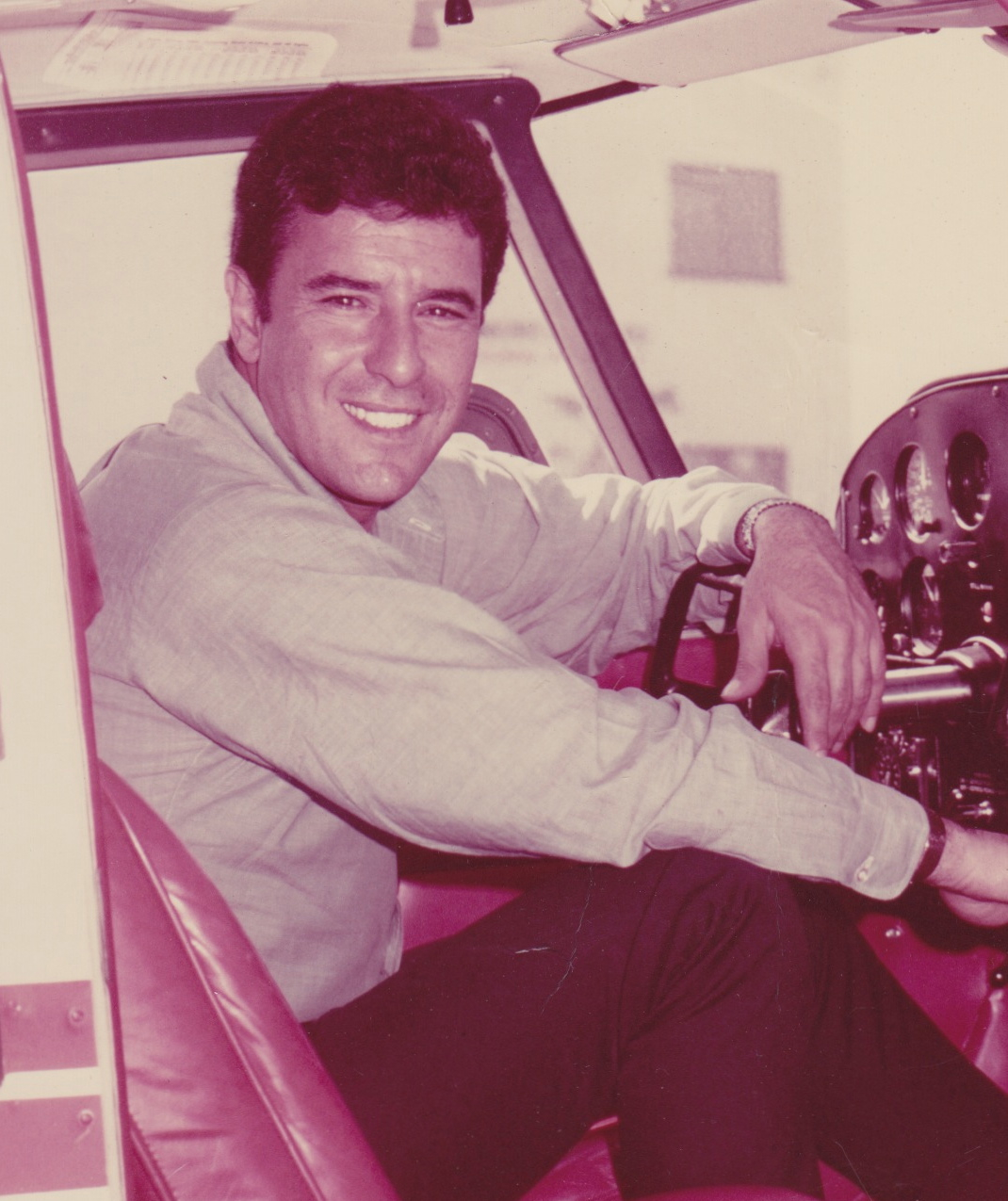
Nico Minardos at controls of a Cessna airplane

In 1986, Minardos was one of the defendants in a case related to the Iran–Contra affair, resulting from Minardos' business association with the Saudi arms merchant Adnan Khashoggi. Minardos was caught in an FBI sting operation in New York and was indicted by then-U.S. Attorney Rudy Giuliani on charges of conspiracy to illegally ship arms to Iran. He was represented by attorneys William Kunstler and Ron Kuby in this case. Minardos was interviewed by Mike Wallace for a segment of the show 60 Minutes regarding his role in the case. Although the indictment was dismissed, the cost of his legal defense drove him to the point of bankruptcy and ended his Hollywood career. Minardos traded his home in Beverly Hills for a sailing yacht in Florida, which he outfitted and sailed across the Atlantic Ocean to his Greek homeland with a crew that included his son George.

== Later life ==
Minardos retired to Fort Lauderdale, Florida, during the 1990s and 2000s, but moved to Southern California in 2009 after suffering a stroke. He died in 2011 in Woodland Hills, California, at age 81. He was the subject of a 2010 documentary about his life titled Finding Nico, produced and directed by his godson Owen Prell, whose father, Donald Prell, was a longtime friend of Minardos from their bachelor days in Los Angeles in the 1950s.

== Filmography ==
Year	Title	Role	Notes
1952	Monkey Business	Handsome Guy at Pool	Uncredited
1953	The Glory Brigade	Greek Soldier	Uncredited
1954	The Egyptian	Minor Role	Uncredited
1955	Jump into Hell	Guard	Uncredited
1955	Desert Sands	Gerard	
1956	The Ten Commandments	Courtier	Uncredited
1956	Three Brave Men	Friend	Uncredited
1957	Istanbul	Ali	
1957	Under Fire	Pvt. Tartolia	Uncredited
1957	Ghost Diver	Manco Capao	
1959	Holiday for Lovers	Carlos Barroso	
1960	Twelve Hours to Kill	Martin Filones	
1962	Samar	Capt. De Guzman	
1962	It Happened in Athens	Lt. Alexi Vinardos	
1966	Mission: Impossible	Carlos	Episode: "Odds On Evil"
1967	Hondo	Ponce	Episode: "Hondo and the Savage"
1968	Day of the Evil Gun	DeLeon	
1968	Daring Game	Ricardo Balboa	
1970	Cannon for Cordoba	Peter	
1977	Assault on Agathon	Cabot Cain	
