= Children, Mother, and the General =

1955 film

- Film poster
- Directed by: László Benedek
- Written by: Herbert Reinecker (novel); Laszlo Benedek
- Produced by: Erich Pommer
- Starring: Hilde Krahl; Therese Giehse; Ewald Balser
- Cinematography: Günther Rittau
- Edited by: Anneliese Artelt
- Music by: Werner Eisbrenner
- Production company: Intercontinental Film
- Distributed by: Schorcht Filmverleih
- Release date: 3 March 1955
- Running time: 110 minutes
- Country: West Germany
- Language: German

Children, Mother, and the General (German: Kinder, Mütter und ein General, and also released as Sons, Mothers, and a General) is a 1955 West German war film directed by László Benedek and starring Hilde Krahl, Therese Giehse and Ewald Balser. The film was not a popular success, possibly because its anti-war perspective clashed with support for German rearmament and membership in NATO.

The film's sets were designed by the art director Erich Kettelhut and Johannes Ott. It was shot at the Bavaria Studios in Munich and the Wandsbek Studios in Hamburg. Location filming took place on Lüneburg Heath.

== Cast ==
- Hilde Krahl as Helene Asmussen
- Ewald Balser as General
- Therese Giehse as Elfriede Bergmann
- Ursula Herking as Dr. Behrens, Ärztin
- Alice Treff as Pastorin
- Beate Koepnick as Inge
- Marianne Sinclair as Näherin
- Adi Lödel as Harald Asmussen
- Dieter Straub as Leo Bergmann
- Holger Hildmann as Sohn der Ärztin
- Karl-Michael Kuntz as Edmund, Sohn der Pastorin
- Walter Lehfeld as Werner, Sohn der Näherin
- Peter Burger as Robert, Inges Bruder
- Bernhard Wicki as Hauptmann Dornberg
- Claus Biederstaedt as Verpflegungsgefreiter
- Rudolf Fernau as Stabsarzt
- Hans Christian Blech as Feldwebel mit den Orden
- Klaus Kinski as Leutnant
- Maximilian Schell as Deserteur
- Alfred Schieske as Fahrer mit der Flasche

== Bibliography ==
- Hake, Sabine. German National Cinema. Routledge, 2013.
