= Cannon for Cordoba =

1970 film

- Directed by: Paul Wendkos
- Written by: Stephen Kandel
- Produced by: Vincent M. Fennelly
- Starring: George Peppard; Giovanna Ralli; Raf Vallone; Pete Duel; Don Gordon; Nico Minardos
- Cinematography: Antonio Macasoli
- Edited by: Walter A. Hanneman
- Music by: Elmer Bernstein
- Production company: The Mirisch Production Company
- Distributed by: United Artists
- Release date: October 1970
- Running time: 104 minutes
- Country: United States
- Language: English

Cannon for Cordoba is a 1970 American Western film. Filmed in Spain, the larger part of the movie takes place in Mexico in 1912. Directed by Paul Wendkos, it stars George Peppard, Pete Duel, Giovanna Ralli and Raf Vallone, and features a musical score by Elmer Bernstein.

In his novelization of Once Upon a Time in Hollywood, Quentin Tarantino places fictional actor Rick Dalton (Leonardo DiCaprio) in the role of Jackson Harkness.

== Plot ==
Groups of Mexican revolutionaries are attacking towns on both sides of the Mexican–American border in 1912. Héctor Cordoba, a former Mexican army general, leads the most powerful of these groups. His men capture six cannons in a surprise attack, prompting the United States government to put General John J. "Blackjack" Pershing in charge of a mission to prevent the cannons' use against American citizens or property. Pershing instructs Captain Rod Douglas to take a group of men on a dangerous mission into Cordoba's territory.

The first volunteer is Jackson Harkness, a soldier who had worked with Douglas undercover, posing as sympathizers in Cordoba's camp. When Cordoba tortured and killed Harkness' brother, Douglas forbade him from intervening to preserve their cover. Harkness wants vengeance on Douglas as much as Cordoba. Andy Rice and Peter have just escaped from an army jail when Douglas arrives with orders for their release to join him on the mission. Mexican lieutenant, Antonio Gutierrez, holds a personal grudge against Cordoba, and demands to join the expedition, telling Douglas he knows a woman named Leonora Cristobal who wishes to see Cordoba dead and can maneuver him into a vulnerable position when they make their move.

Antonio and Leonora travel to Cordoba's camp. Leonora, knowing the Mexican government wants Cordoba captured alive, betrays Antonio and informs the bandit leader of his intentions. She hopes to entice him into lowering his guard around her until she can kill him herself. Douglas, Andy, Peter, and Harkness arrive later posing as sympathizers. Hearing what Leonora did prompts them to act quickly. Douglas starts a fight as a ruse to be sent to jail where he can help Antonio escape. Andy frees them both that night, disguised as a Mexican guard. Douglas captures Cordoba after finding Leonora alone with him. Jackson and Peter open fire on the camp with the cannons while Andy and Antonio shoot flares into the buildings. The group attempts to flee the camp amid the chaos once the cannons are destroyed. Peter, Antonio, and Andy are killed and Cordoba, their prisoner, is wounded.

The survivors stop the next morning, miles away from the camp. Douglas goes off to scout and Harkness follows him, demands he turns around, and draws his gun to avenge his brother. Douglas walks unflinchingly toward Harkness, fails to pull the trigger, and punches Douglas instead. They decide the score is now settled and the two men return to Leonora. Cordoba has died from his wound.

== Cast ==
- George Peppard ... Captain Rod Douglas
- Pete Duel ... Andy Rice
- Giovanna Ralli ... Leonora Cristobal
- Don Gordon ... Jackson Harkness
- Raf Vallone ... General Héctor Cordoba
- Nico Minardos ... Peter
- Gabriele Tinti ... Lieutenant Antonio Gutierrez
- John Larch ... Warner
- Francine York ... Sophia
- John Russell ... John J. "Blackjack" Pershing
- Lionel Murton ... Colonel Hammond
- Hans Meyer ... Svedborg

== Production ==
According to Quentin Tarantino the film had its origins as a sequel to Guns of the Magnificent Seven but was later rewritten to be a stand-alone film at the behest of George Peppard. Tarantino called it "a damn exciting script" and "I still really dig Cannon for Cordoba" although he felt Peppard was miscast.

The movie was at one stage called The Dragonmaster. Filming started in Spain on 7 July 1969.

Peppard's fee at this stage was $400,000 a film plus a percentage. It was one of a number of medium budgeted genre movies Peppard made around this time.

== Reception ==
=== Critical ===
Variety wrote the filmmakers "seemingly might have put together a fairly arresting actioner. But they show an unsteady composite hand, for the script (if it has been adhered to) is an unorganized thing and the direction reflects less than modest success in clear story-telling. There are some colorful moments."

The Los Angeles Times called it "sloppy in its sense of period and relentlessly plodding in writing and directing... wastes movie making at its most mechanical and wastes a cast that includes much proven talent."

=== Box office ===
Arthur Krim of United Artists later did an assessment of the film as part of an evaluation of the company's inventory:

In 1970 there was a marked change in global acceptance of western and adventure film. The results of films of other companies - for instance Mackenna's Gold, Murphy's War, The Last Valley - as well as our own - Play Dirty, The Bridge at Remagen - indicated a need for substantial downward revisions in assessing proper budget costs for pictures in this category - even with the so-called big name action stars. This picture [Cannon for Cordoba] falls in that category. If programmed today, it would be considered acceptable only if it could be made at half cost.

== See also ==
- List of American films of 1970
