= Twelve Hours to Kill =

- Directed by: Edward L. Cahn
- Written by: Jerry Sohl
- Based on: Set Up for Murder; 1959 Saturday Evening Post by Richard G. Stern
- Produced by: John Healy
- Starring: Nico Minardos; Barbara Eden; Grant Richards
- Cinematography: Floyd Crosby
- Edited by: Betty Steinberg
- Music by: Paul Dunlap
- Distributed by: 20th Century Fox
- Release date: April 2, 1960
- Running time: 83 minutes
- Country: United States
- Language: English

Twelve Hours to Kill (also known as 12 Hours to Kill) is an 1960 American crime drama film directed by Edward L. Cahn and starring Nico Minardos and Barbara Eden.

== Plot ==
Martin Filones (Nico Minardos), a young Greek man, witnesses the murder of gangster Frankie Russo, and is ushered off into the relative "safety" of suburban obscurity by Lt. Jim Carnevan (Grant Richards), unaware that he is being double-crossed by a crooked gendarme. Barbara Eden plays the femme fatale of the story.

== Cast ==
- Nico Minardos as Martin Filones
- Barbara Eden as Lucy Hall
- Grant Richards as Det. Lt. Jim Carnevan
- Russ Conway as Capt. Willie Long
- Art Baker as Capt. Johns
- Gavin MacLeod as Johnny
- Kitty Kelly in a minor role
- Cece Whitney as Clara Carnevan
- Richard Reeves as Mark
- Byron Foulger as Elby Gardner
- Barbara Mansell as Cynthia
- Ted Knight as Police Sgt. Denton
- Shepherd Sanders as Frankie Russo
- Charles Meredith as Druggist
- Stewart Conway as Bert – Policeman
- Don Collier as Andy – Policeman

== Production ==
Twelve Hours to Kill was the first lead role for Nico Minadros, who had been in Holiday for Lovers.

== See also ==
- List of American films of 1960
