= Port of New York (film) =

1949 film by László Benedek

- Theatrical release poster
- Directed by: László Benedek
- Screenplay by: Eugene Ling
- Story by: Arthur A. Ross; Bert Murray
- Produced by: Aubrey Schenck
- Starring: Scott Brady; Richard Rober; K. T. Stevens; Yul Brynner
- Narrated by: Chet Huntley
- Cinematography: George E. Diskant
- Edited by: Norman Colbert
- Music by: Sol Kaplan
- Color process: Black and white
- Production companies: Samba Films; Contemporary Productions
- Distributed by: Eagle-Lion Films
- Release date: November 28, 1949 (United States)
- Running time: 82 minutes
- Country: United States
- Language: English

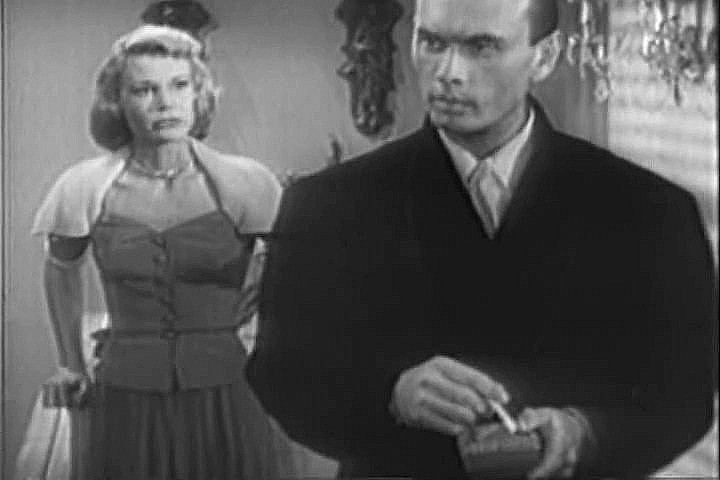
K.T. Stevens and Yul Brynner

Port of New York is a 1949 American film noir/crime film directed by László Benedek with cinematography by George E. Diskant and shot in semidocumentary style. The film is notable for being Yul Brynner's first film appearance. The film, which is very similar to T-Men (1947), was shot on location in New York City.

== Plot ==
Narrator Chet Huntley introduces two federal agents, Mickey Waters of the U.S. Customs Service and Jim Flannery of the Federal Bureau of Narcotics. They are out to stop the distribution of an opium shipment stolen from the S.S. Florentine in the Port of New York. The leader of the thieves is the suave drug dealer Paul Vicola.

The ship’s purser was murdered in the heist. Toni Cardell was a passenger on the ship and girlfriend of Vicola. She played a part in the smuggling, is upset about the murder, and wants out. When Vicola refuses to stake her for a new life elsewhere, Toni calls the police to become an informant. She has a rendezvous on a subway platform with Flannery to plan another meeting, but Vicola garrotes her before she can complete her plans. She had a train reservation, so police search all the lockers at Penn Station and find a parcel of opium. They stake out the locker and follow the pick-up man to a nightclub. He is comic Dolly Carney, who discloses under police pressure his contact, Leo Stasser, at the North River Yacht marina. Carney's friend, a dancer at the nightclub named Lili Long, observed his arrest by Waters and Flannery, and, on a tip from the nightclub owner, goes to Vicola for help.

The agents stake out Stasser at his harbor marina. Waters slips in under cover of working on a boat there. That night, they search Stasser's office and find he has all the lab supplies ready to cut the "junk." Flannery also finds a message from a G.W. Wyley about the drug deal. Stasser and his men return and find Waters, but Flannery escapes. The next day Waters’ body is found floating in the bay. Stasser bails Carney out of jail, then throws him out the window of his high-rise apartment.

En route to New York to complete the drug deal, Wyley is arrested during a layover at the airport in Chicago. Impersonating him, Flannery arrives at La Guardia as scheduled. As the deal proceeds on Vicola's yacht, Lili Long comes to him to find out why Carney would have killed himself. She innocently reveals that Flannery is a cop, and a shootout ensues. The yacht flees, it is pursued by the Coast Guard, and Vicola and his gang are apprehended.

== Cast ==
- Scott Brady as Michael 'Mickey' Waters, U.S. Customs agent
- Richard Rober as Jim Flannery, FBI agent
- K.T. Stevens as Miss Toni Cardell, moll
- Yul Brynner as Paul Vicola, drug smuggler
- Arthur Blake as Dolly Carney, nightclub comic
- Lynne Carter as Lili Long, nightclub dancer
- John Kellogg as Lenny, gang member
- William Challee as Leo Stasser, harbor boss
- Gordon Richards as Florentine's Purser (uncredited)

== Reception ==
=== Critical response ===
In 1998 the film critic of The Austin Chronicle offered a mixed review, stating:

Semi-documentary police procedurals became quite popular for a while in the late Forties, with lots of location shooting and official-sounding voiceovers. Port of New York follows in the style of The House on 92nd Street and Jules Dassin's The Naked City, with a fair amount of suspense and plenty of violent fisticuffs. George Diskant brought his striking camera work to bear as well; sometimes the 'dark film' is so dark it's hard to even see what's going on. Most notable, however, is Brynner's first film role; he plays Vicola with sleek menace and self-assured evil (and with a full head of hair, too, I might add). Not an outstanding film, Port of New York is well-suited to its subject matter and has been rather neglected for years.

In 2007 Oszus film critic Dennis Schwartz also gave the film a mixed review, writing:

An unknown Yul Brynner, with all his hair, in his first film role, plays a well-spoken, smug narcotics smuggler named Paul Vicola. It's directed by Lazslo Benedek (The Wild One/The Night Visitor/Death of a Salesman) in a voice-over documentary style...It generates an authentic sinister atmosphere, having been filmed on location in New York. The police investigation procedural drama plays as minor film noir, that follows along the usual routine lines for such Eagle-Lion cheapie crime stories ... Not much to get excited about, but it does feature an early acting part by Yul Brynner as a ruthless gangster.
