= The Marriage-Go-Round =

Play written by Leslie Stevens

- Original language: English
- Written by: Leslie Stevens
- Characters: Paul Delville; Content Lowell (Mrs. Paul Delville); Katrin Sveg; Ross Barnett
- Genre: Sex comedy
- Setting: Traditional college town up the river from New York City, present-day

Premiere
- Date: October 29, 1958
- Place: Plymouth Theatre

The Marriage-Go-Round is a 1958 play written by Leslie Stevens. The 1961 film adaptation of the same name, written and produced by Stevens, stars Susan Hayward, James Mason and Julie Newmar, who reprised her role from the play. The play follows a happily married academic couple whose life is upended when a bold young Swedish visitor tries to persuade the husband to father her child.

The play was inspired by a suggestion that dancer Isadora Duncan supposedly made to playwright George Bernard Shaw: The two of them should have a child because "with your mind and my body, think what a person it would be!" The play, a sex comedy, was a Broadway theatre success with a run of over 700 performances; it did poorly at the film box office .

== Play ==
The play's original production on Broadway starred Charles Boyer as Dr. Paul Delville, a professor of cultural anthropology at a New York college, Claudette Colbert as Dr. Content Lowell, the Dean of Women at the college and Delville's wife, Julie Newmar as Katrin Sveg, and Edmon Ryan as Ross Barnett.

=== Reception ===
Brooks Atkinson of The New York Times called the Broadway production at the Plymouth Theatre "droll and buoyant" and its direction by Joseph Anthony "immaculate."

At the 13th Tony Awards, Newmar won Best Featured Actress and Colbert was nominated for Best Lead Actress. Colbert lost to Gertrude Berg, who won for her performance in A Majority of One.

The play was in part a success due to charity theater parties, such as one sponsored by Maternity Center Association, which bought all seats for one night's performance in November 1958, paying $5,700 and netting $16,000 after selling tickets to its members that were priced between $10 and $30.
