= The Night Visitor =

1971 film

- Directed by: László Benedek
- Written by: Guy Elmes
- Produced by: Mel Ferrer; Sidney Glazier
- Starring: Max von Sydow; Liv Ullmann; Trevor Howard; Per Oscarsson; Rupert Davies; Andrew Keir
- Cinematography: Henning Kristiansen
- Edited by: Bill Blunden
- Music by: Henry Mancini
- Release date: February 10, 1971
- Running time: 106 mins.
- Country: United States
- Language: English

The Night Visitor is a 1971 American psychological thriller film, shot at Copenhagen's Asa and Laterna Studios in 1970, starring Max von Sydow, Liv Ullmann, Trevor Howard, Per Oscarsson, Rupert Davies and Andrew Keir, and directed by László Benedek.

== Plot ==
Salem is an inmate of an insane asylum, having been forced to take an insanity plea when wrongly convicted of murdering a farmhand.

After two years of confinement, Salem escapes from the fortress-like asylum in the dead of winter and heads for the family farm, which is now run by his younger sisters Emmie and Ester and the latter's husband, Dr Anton Jenks, who had accused Salem of the murder. For revenge, Salem kills the people he believes responsible for his confinement. He starts with Emmie, arranging the murder to appear as if Anton is the killer. He also kills Britt, a girl he was with on the night of the murder who could have provided his alibi but refused to do so. He then returns to the asylum, not having been missed.

A local police inspector resolves to uncover the truth of the murders and Salem's conviction. Anton, meanwhile, insists that he saw Salem at the site of Emma's murder. But, as far as the inspector can tell, escape from the asylum is a physical impossibility.

Even so, Salem does it again the following night, this time with a corrupt barrister called Mr Clemens in his sights. Following a visit from the inspector, the bedridden Clemens has called Anton to his home, confronting him about their collusion during the trial. Anton leaves after giving Clemens a harmless sedative, but then Salem enters and kills the lawyer in his sleep by administering a lethal injection.

Salem proceeds to the farmhouse. There he acquires a coat, biding his time as the panicked Ester talks to the inspector. After the police leave, Ester is cornered in the barn and hacked to pieces by Salem when she attempts to flee. When Anton arrives, Salem wipes the blood-smeared axe on the doctor's clothes, just as Anton had pinned the farmhand's murder on Salem two years earlier. Salem then heads back to the asylum. Descending into madness, Anton confesses his crime to the inspector, prompting the latter to rush to the asylum.

By the narrowest of margins, Salem manages to return to his cell before the inspector can get there. But, at the last moment, his alibi is ruined in a completely unexpected way.

== Cast ==
- Max von Sydow as Salem
- Trevor Howard as Inspector
- Liv Ullmann as Ester Jenks
- Per Oscarsson as Anton Jenks
- Rupert Davies as Mr. Clemens
- Andrew Keir as Dr. Kemp
- Jim Kennedy as Carl
- Arthur Hewlett as Pop
- Hanne Bork as Emmie
- Gretchen Franklin as Mrs. Hansen
- Bjørn Watt-Boolsen as Mr. Torens
- Lotte Freddie as Britt Torens
- Erik Kühnau as Police doctor

== Production ==
Christopher Lee was closely involved with producer Mel Ferrer in developing the film. In the 2001 book Christopher Lee as The Authorised Screen History, Jonathan Rigby points out that having "even paid for rewrites, Lee was disagreeably surprised when Max von Sydow was cast as Salem instead."

The film is notable for its unusual score by renowned Hollywood film and TV composer Henry Mancini. The music was arranged for synthesiser, 12 woodwinds, organ, two pianos and two harpsichords, and Mancini achieved an unsettling effect by having one of the harpsichords tuned a quarter-tone flat.

== Release ==
The film was released theatrically in North America in 1971 by Universal Marion Corporation (UMC). It was re-released in 1981 under the title Lunatic by 21st Century Film Corporation.

The film is currently available on DVD and Blu-Ray from VCI Entertainment.
