= The Marriage-Go-Round (film) =

1961 American comedy film

- Theatrical release poster
- Directed by: Walter Lang
- Screenplay by: Leslie Stevens
- Based on: The Marriage-Go-Round; 1958 play by Leslie Stevens
- Produced by: Leslie Stevens
- Starring: Susan Hayward; James Mason; Julie Newmar
- Cinematography: Leo Tover
- Edited by: Jack W. Holmes
- Music by: Dominic Frontiere
- Production company: Daystar Productions
- Distributed by: 20th Century Fox
- Release date: January 6, 1961
- Running time: 98 minutes
- Country: United States
- Language: English
- Budget: $3 million
- Box office: $1.3 million (US/Canada)

The Marriage-Go-Round is a 1961 DeLuxe Color CinemaScope American comedy film directed by Walter Lang and written by Leslie Stevens. It is based on the 1958 play The Marriage-Go-Round, also penned by Stevens. The film stars Susan Hayward, James Mason, Julie Newmar, Robert Paige and June Clayworth. It was released on January 6, 1961, by 20th Century Fox.

It was filmed on location at Florida Southern College in Lakeland, Florida and at Stage 4 on the Twentieth Century-Fox lot.

== Plot ==
At a Florida college, professor Paul Delville and wife Content, who is the school's dean of women, anticipate visitors from Sweden. The people they expect are a former colleague, Professor Sveg, and his daughter Katrin.

Katrin arrives alone. The Delvilles are astounded that Katrin, whom they remember as a gangly teenager, has grown into a statuesque, blonde bombshell. Their astonishment is just the beginning because Katrin brashly announces that she wants Paul to sire a baby with her, assuring offspring with both brains and beauty.

Paul is flustered by Katrin's unwillingness to take no for an answer. She gives him a nude statue of herself, suns herself at his house in nothing but a skimpy towel, then shows up at a swim team practice in a provocative bathing suit.

Katrin's come-ons become a greater temptation, causing Content to seek the advice of a friend on campus, Dr. Ross Barnett, a married professor. Ross dares her to "call his bluff", which is his way of trying to seduce Content for himself. She returns home and finds her husband and Katrin in a passionate kiss, but when he swears his allegiance and that nothing has happened, Content believes him. Katrin finally gives up and decides to try someone else.

== Cast ==
- Susan Hayward as Content Delville
- James Mason as Paul Delville
- Julie Newmar as Katrin Sveg
- Robert Paige as Dr. Ross Barnett
- June Clayworth as Flo Granger
- Joe Kirkwood Jr. as Henry 'Doc' Granger
- Trax Colton as Crew Cut
- Mary Patton as Mamie Barnett

== Production ==
Sol C. Siegel of Metro-Goldwyn-Mayer originally bought the film rights for $400,000.

== Reception ==
Bosley Crowther of The New York Times called the film "giddily light and witty" and a "mentally strip-teasing escapade." He called Newmar a "... specimen of modernity the likes of which we have never expected to see" who "... looks like a twenty-first-century vision, standing a good 6 feet tall and being as beautifully proportioned and persuasive in personality as in physique." Crowther also complimented producer Stevens and director Lang for "settings about as crisp and colorful as one could wish and the whole movement of the running dalliance tasteful and absorbing in the limited space."

The film cost $3 million and was a box office bomb, grossing only $1.3 million in rentals in North America.

== See also ==
- List of American films of 1961
