= Luzé =

- Commune
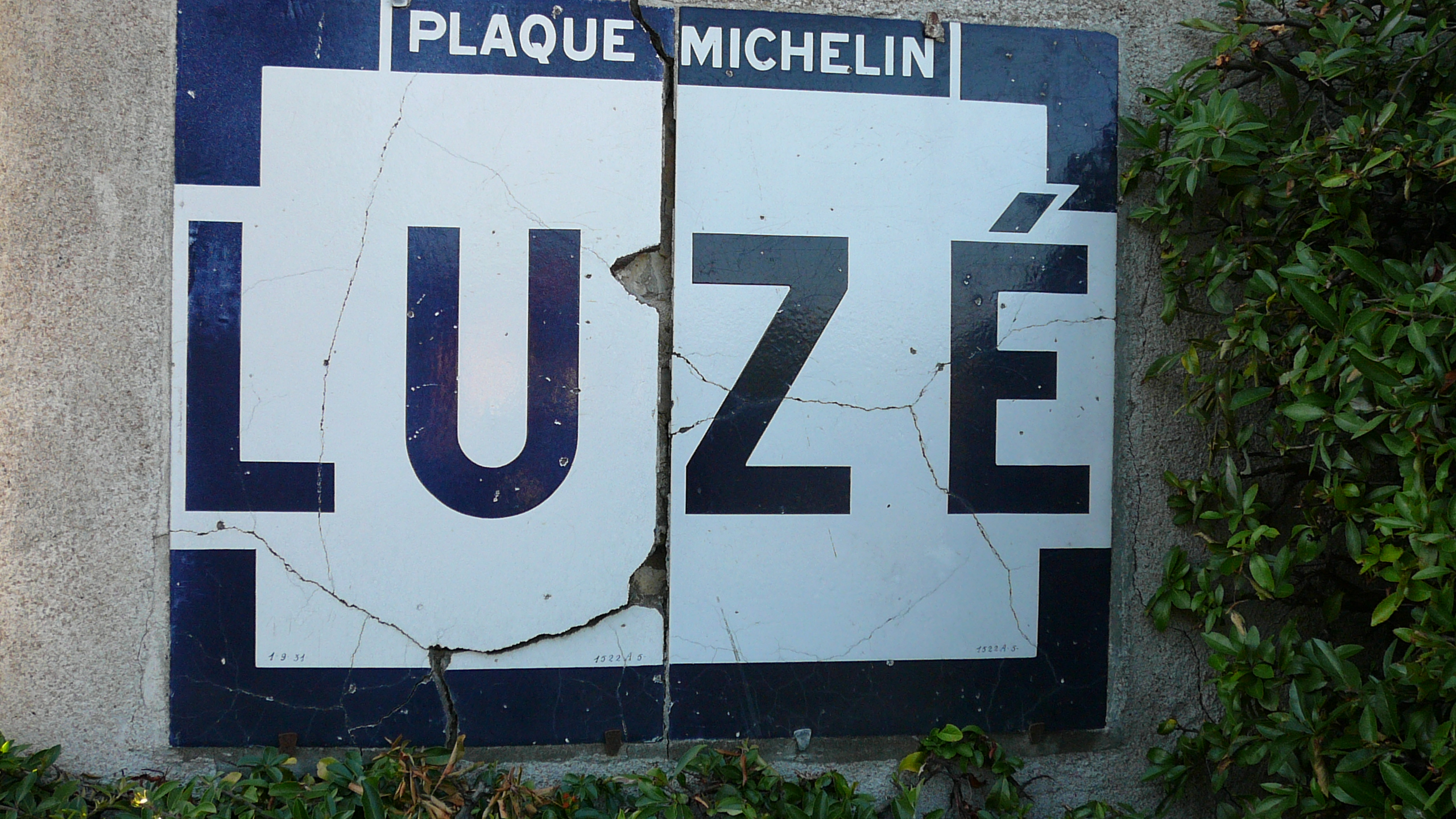
- An old Michelin name board, entering Luzé
- Location of Luzé
- Location within France Location within Centre-Val de Loire
- Coordinates: 47°01′27″N 0°27′11″E
- Country: France
- Region: Centre-Val de Loire
- Department: Indre-et-Loire
- Arrondissement: Chinon
- Canton: Sainte-Maure-de-Touraine

Government
  - Mayor (2020–2026): Annabelle Parent
- Area^{1}: 20.3 km^{2} (7.8 sq mi)
- Highest elevation: 129 m (423 ft)
- Lowest elevation: 65 m (213 ft)
- Population (2023): 276
  - Density: 13.6/km^{2} (35.2/sq mi)
- Time zone: UTC+01:00 (CET)
  - Summer (DST): UTC+02:00 (CEST)
- INSEE/Postal code: 37140 /37120
- ^{1} French Land Register data, which excludes lakes, ponds, glaciers > 1 km^{2} (0.386 sq mi or 247 acres) and river estuaries.

Luzé (French pronunciation: [lyze]) is a commune in the Indre-et-Loire department in central France.

== Population ==
Historical population
Year	Pop.	±% p.a.
1968	396	—
1975	347	−1.87%
1982	323	−1.02%
1990	273	−2.08%
1999	263	−0.41%
2007	272	+0.42%
2012	268	−0.30%
2017	250	−1.38%
2023	276	+1.66%
Source: INSEE

== See also ==
- Communes of the Indre-et-Loire department
