= Venita Wolf =

American actress (1945–2014)

- Wolf in Star Trek, 1966
- Born: September 1, 1945
- Died: November 22, 2014 (aged 69); Hollywood Hills, California, U.S.
- Education: Orange Coast College
- Occupations: Film and television actress

Venita Wolf (September 1, 1945 – November 22, 2014) was an American film and television actress.

== Life and career ==
Wolf was born on September 1, 1945. She attended Orange High School, and she was named the May Festival Queen in her senior year. She also attended Orange Coast College, and in 1963, she was named Miss Anaheim. She acted on television commercials, and she was a hair model for Lady Clairol. She began her screen career in 1966, appearing in the film The Oscar. In 1967, she appeared as Teresa in an episode of the NBC science fiction television series Star Trek.

Wolf (left) with Dennis Cole in The Felony Squad, 1968

Later in her career, Wolf starred as Tina Moss in the comedy musical mystery film Catalina Caper, starring along with Tommy Kirk, Del Moore, Peter Duryea, Ulla Strömstedt, Robert Donner and Michael Blodgett. In July 1967, she appeared on a cover for Playboy. She guest-starred in television programs including Gunsmoke, Please Don't Eat the Daisies, The Wild Wild West, The Felony Squad and The Monkees. She played the recurring roles of Miss Murray and Suzy in the CBS sitcom television series The Beverly Hillbillies.

== Death ==
Wolf died from complications of multiple myeloma and dialysis at her home in Hollywood Hills, California on November 22, 2014, at the age of 69.

== Filmography ==
=== Film ===
Year	Title	Role	Notes
1966	The Oscar	Bikini Girl	Uncredited
1967	Catalina Caper	Tina Moss	

=== Television ===
Year	Title	Role	Notes
1966–1969	The Beverly Hillbillies	Miss Murray / Suzy	7 episodes
1967	The Flying Nun	Cecilia	1 episode
1967	The Monkees	Brenda	1 episode
1967	Gunsmoke	Sister Margaret	1 episode
1967	Star Trek	Teresa	1 episode
1967	The Wild Wild West	Lucy	1 episode
1967	The Second Hundred Years	Ellie	1 episode
1968	The Felony Squad	Secretary	2 episodes
