= List of Flipper episodes =

The following is a list of episodes for Flipper, a television series broadcast by NBC in the United States from 1964 to 1967. The series comprises 88 episodes, all in color.

== Series overview ==
Season	Episodes	Originally released	
Season	Episodes	First released	Last released
1	30	September 19, 1964	April 10, 1965
2	30	September 18, 1965	April 16, 1966
3	28	September 17, 1966	April 15, 1967

== Episodes ==
=== Season 1 (1964–65) ===
No. overall	No. in season	Title	Directed by	Written by	Original release date
1	1	"300 Feet Below"	Hollingsworth Morse	Story by : Ivan Tors; Teleplay by : Peter Dixon	September 19, 1964
The victim of a shark attack far out to sea needs an immediate blood transfusion. Flipper retrieves the plasma from the bottom of the sea when it is dropped from a helicopter. Guest Stars: Bob Sipes as Helicopter Crew Chief, Bill Traylor as Dr. Darmon (as William Traylor), Jessica Walter as Elena Darmon.
2	2	"The Red Hot Car"	Leon Benson	Ernest Spaulding	September 26, 1964
Sandy and Bud discover a bullet-riddled car at the bottom of the bay. When criminals try to blow the car up with the boys trapped inside, Flipper comes to the rescue and the criminals are taken by the police. Guest Stars: Mart Hulswit as Johnny, Robert Reilly as Dick, Frank Schuller as Policeman
3	3	"S.O.S Dolphin"	Leon Benson	Art Arthur	October 3, 1964
Series pilot. Dr. Rockwell, a visiting ichthyotoxicologist, is stung by a poisonous scorpionfish while doing research. Flipper leads Porter to Dr. Rockwell's sub and the man is saved. Guest Stars: Linda Bennett as 'Grandma' Hadley, John Lasell as Dr. Rockwell
4	4	"The Gulf Between"	Hollingsworth Morse	Ernest Spaulding	October 10, 1964
Bud thinks his life will change drastically if his father marries. He gets into trouble during a storm at sea and is rescued by his father's girlfriend. Guest Star: Diana Van der Vlis as Kathryn Terrence
5	5	"City Boy"	Herman Hoffman	Lee Erwin	October 17, 1964
A troubled teen from New York City causes concern for the Ricks family. The boy's stepfather rescues him from a sunken vessel. Guest Stars: M'el Dowd as Amy Field, Philip Vandervort as Mike Belden, Jason Greene as Sam Field
6	6	"Dolphin for Sale"	Leon Benson	Story by : Art Arthur; Teleplay by : Stanley H. Silverman	October 24, 1964
A dishonest fisherman lures Flipper from the preserve and wants to sell him to a circus. The Rickses come to his rescue. Guest Stars: Dan Chandler as Warden Dennis, John McGovern as Constable Peters, Duke Farley as Kyle Stewart, Ken Drake as Dorrie Stone. Warden Dennis becomes a recurring character.
7	7	"Not Necessarily Gospel"	Leon Benson	Lee Erwin	October 31, 1964
Porter searches for lobster poachers on the preserve and is given some assistance by an old marine carpenter named Hap. Andy Devine's first of five appearances as Hap Gorman in season 1. His name would be included in the opening sequences of only the five episodes in which he appeared. Other guest Stars: Michael Conrad as Conlon, Dan Chandler as Warden Dennis.
8	8	"Countdown for Flipper"	Herman Hoffman	Orville H. Hampton	November 7, 1964
Flipper is believed to have eaten a valuable research specimen, and is slated to be cut open to retrieve it. The boys, meanwhile, find the fish on the boat of a thief. Guest Stars: Frank Schofield as Dr. Koenig, Jon Cypher as Jim Lorman
9	9	"Mr. Marvello"	Frank McDonald	Peter Dixon & Laird Koenig	November 14, 1964
A ventriloquist wants to use Flipper in a circus act. He changes his mind when he realizes how deeply the boys love the dolphin. Guest Stars: John Abbott as "Professor" Marvello, Matt Crowley as Parkey
10	10	"My Brother Flipper"	Leon Benson	Kay Lenard & Jess Carneol	November 21, 1964
An elderly Greek sponge diver, who claims Flipper is the reincarnation of his late brother, is caught poaching on the preserve. Guest Stars: Tommy Lane as Nick, Dino Terranova as Alexis Demopoulos, Cal Bellini as Tommie Demopoulos
11	11	"The Second Time Around"	Frank McDonald	Story by : Robert Sabaroff; Teleplay by : Orville H. Hampton	November 28, 1964
Paralyzed young water skier Linda Granville (Lynda Day George) places herself in the path of a hurricane.
12	12	"Lady and the Dolphin: Part 1"	Hollingsworth Morse	Story by : Peter Dixon; Teleplay by : Orville H. Hampton & Peter Dixon	December 5, 1964
Congresswoman Helen Browning (Margaret Hayes) takes a tour of the park, to decide if it should be closed down. Other guest stars: Andy Devine as Hap Gorman, Barbara Feldon as Erna Morley, the congresswoman's secretary.
13	13	"Lady and the Dolphin: Part 2"	Ricou Browning	Story by : Peter Dixon; Teleplay by : Orville H. Hampton & Peter Dixon	December 12, 1964
Congresswoman Browning (Margaret Hayes) takes an underwater tour of the preserve. Other guest stars: Andy Devine as Hap Gorman, Barbara Feldon appearing again briefly as Erna Morley, the congresswoman's secretary.
14	14	"Danger"	Hollingsworth Morse	Jack Cowden & Ricou Browning	December 19, 1964
A gambler heavily in debt concocts a dangerous scheme, with Sandy, Bud and Hap inadvertently manning a boat rigged to explode. Guest star: Andy Devine as Hap Gorman.
15	15	"The Misanthrope"	Frank McDonald	Story by : Arthur Richards; Teleplay by : Alan Caillou & Lee Erwin	December 26, 1964
Two thieves hold the boys hostage while robbing a boat in the park. Michael Masters as Pete.
16	16	"Flipper's Bank Account"	Hollingsworth Morse	Story by : Donn Mullally; Teleplay by : Donn Mullally & Maria K. Little	January 2, 1965
On Sandy's birthday, a worthless old coin that Flipper brings to Bud sets off a huge treasure hunt in the park. Guest stars: Andy Devine in his final appearance as Hap Gorman, Charles G. Martin as the coin dealer, the first of three guest roles.
17	17	"The Lifeguard"	Frank McDonald	Story by : Ivan Tors; Teleplay by : Elmer Parsons	January 9, 1965
Flipper's ability as a lifeguard is tested when he saves a woman (Betsy Jones-Moreland) from drowning. Ricou Browning as a water skier.
18	18	"The Day of the Shark"	Ricou Browning	Richard Tuber	January 16, 1965
A marine researcher (Marshall Thompson, who would go on to direct four upcoming episodes) is called in to investigate when a school of sharks invades the park.
19	19	"Love and Sandy"	Ricou Browning	Story by : Ricou Browning; Teleplay by : Maria K. Little	January 23, 1965
Sandy is smitten by pretty Bonnie McCoy (Cheryl Miller, in the first of four appearances), and agrees to help her find her lost seal.
20	20	"Money to Blow"	Ricou Browning	Jack Cowden & Ricou Browning	January 30, 1965
Flipper finds money in a shipwreck and gives it to Bud, who promptly goes on a spending spree. The trouble is, the bills are counterfeit!
21	21	"Flipper's Treasure"	Marshall Thompson	Maria K. Little & James M. Buxbaum	February 6, 1965
Flipper and Bud find treasure — and trouble — aboard the wreck of a sunken Spanish ship. Guest star: Charles G. Martin as the fraudulent "expert".
22	22	"The White Dolphin"	Marshall Thompson	Maria K. Little	February 13, 1965
Flipper's new friend, a rare albino dolphin, attracts the attention of some unscrupulous locals hoping to exploit the exotic creature. In the end, it turns out the albino is a female whose baby Flipper has fathered!
23	23	"Teamwork"	Marshall Thompson	Maria K. Little & Orville H. Hampton	February 20, 1965
Bud and Sandy prepare for the annual Coral Key Park swim race, unaware that the water has been polluted by toxic chemicals.
24	24	"Flipper and the Elephant: Part 1"	Andrew Marton	Maria K. Little & James M. Buxbaum	February 27, 1965
Bonnie McCoy (Cheryl Miller) returns with her wrecked floating zoo, father (Pat Henning), elephant, chimpanzee and money woes.
25	25	"Flipper and the Elephant: Part 2"	Andrew Marton	Maria K. Little & James M. Buxbaum	March 6, 1965
The boys join Bonnie McCoy (Cheryl Miller) in her desperate scheme to save the floating zoo. Pat Henning as her father.
26	26	"Flipper and the Elephant: Part 3"	Andrew Marton	Maria K. Little & James M. Buxbaum	March 13, 1965
Sandy, Bud, and Flipper put on an aquatic show to raise bail money for Bonnie's (Cheryl Miller) wrongly-accused father (Pat Henning).
27	27	"Bud Minds Baby"	Ricou Browning	Jack Cowden	March 20, 1965
Bud foolishly mimics a TV hero by trying to rescue a young runaway girl. Denise Nickerson as Tina, Julie Sommars as Tina's mother.
28	28	"Sailor Bud"	Marshall Thompson	Jack Cowden	March 27, 1965
Bud tries to help a couple marooned on a sailboat, but it's up to a certain dolphin to truly save the day.
29	29	"The Call of the Dolphin"	Ricou Browning	Maria K. Little & James M. Buxbaum	April 3, 1965
Visiting marine scientist Dr. Peter Kellwin (James Best) uses recordings of dolphin calls to trick Flipper and lure him away.
30	30	"Flipper's Monster"	Ricou Browning	Art Arthur	April 10, 1965
Flipper is starstruck when a film company arrives at the park to shoot an aquatic-monster (Ricou Browning, recalling his portrayal of the Creature from the Black Lagoon) movie. Wende Wagner as Ella Bailey, the starlet.

=== Season 2 (1965–66) ===
No. overall	No. in season	Title	Directed by	Written by	Original release date
31	1	"Flipper and the Mermaid"	Ricou Browning	Maria K. Little	September 18, 1965
Porter is not happy with the new lady scientist who seems to have taken over the park. And worse — she intends to take Flipper away to help her. The first of 12 appearances by Ulla Stromstedt as Ulla Norstrand during season 2.
32	2	"Dolphin in Pursuit (1)"	Stanley Z. Cherry	Story by : Maria K. Little and James M. Buxbaum; Teleplay by : Maria K. Little	September 25, 1965
The Rickses, in need of some R&R, take off to an island "miles from civilization" to go camping. On their way they get word that there is an escaped convict at large. Porter gets permission to continue on his vacation, but after their boat is stolen, it becomes clear that this is no vacation. Flipper takes off in hot pursuit of the thief! Guest Stars: Burt Reynolds as Al Bardeman, Ulla Stromstedt as Ulla Norstrand.
33	3	"Dolphin in Pursuit (2)"	Stanley Z. Cherry	Story by : Maria K. Little and James M. Buxbaum; Teleplay by : Maria K. Little	October 2, 1965
The Rickses are stranded on an uninhabited island and Flipper is missing as the convicted killer, Al Bardeman, is getting further and further away in Ulla's stolen submarine. Once Flipper returns and their abandoned boat is recovered, Porter and Sandy take off in pursuit of the felon, guided by Flipper. But catching up with him has its own dangers, especially for Sandy. Guest Stars: Burt Reynolds as Al Bardeman, Ulla Stromstedt as Ulla Norstrand.
34	4	"Flipper's Hour of Peril"	Ricou Browning	Monroe Manning	October 9, 1965
Flipper is in grave danger when he gets trapped in a net that is attached to a floating mine in rough waters near rocks. Porter and the boys must free him before the whole family gets blown up.
35	5	"Coral Fever"	Ricou Browning	Orville H. Hampton	October 16, 1965
Flipper is injured during an explosion set off by a coral poacher (Bo Svenson), and the examining doctor announces that Flipper has been deafened, a critical condition for a dolphin, and will probably have to be put to sleep. Porter tries to get to the bottom of who set off that explosion while the boys take vigil at Flipper's side, praying he pulls through.
36	6	"Junior Ranger"	Stanley Z. Cherry	Maria K. Little	October 23, 1965
A young ranger trainee (Karl Held) has arrived at Coral Key to meet with Porter Ricks. It doesn't take long for the Rickses to figure out that this new ranger is cocky and needs to be taught what being a ranger is really about — following the rules. He endangers Bud's life by disobeying his advice then blames it on Bud. Will this Ranger ever "get" what it's all about? Ulla Stromstedt as Ulla Norstrand.
37	7	"The Ditching (1)"	Andrew Marton	Story by : Ricou Browning, Jack Cowden; Teleplay by : Lee Erwin	October 30, 1965
Sandy talks Porter into letting him travel with Flipper in a small plane while Porter stays on the Island with Ulla (Ulla Stromstedt). Flipper is on his way to the lab to be studied for a while. But a flock of birds puts Flipper, Sandy, and the others on the plane in grave danger. The first of four episodes in which Bud does not appear in season 2. Note: This marks the first appearance of Oceanic Airlines.
38	8	"The Ditching (2)"	Andrew Marton	Story by : Ricou Browning, Jack Cowden; Teleplay by : Lee Erwin	November 6, 1965
While the plane's crew continue to try to get Sandy out from under the large crate that has him pinned, a county-wide search and rescue is on but the plane is like a pea in a great big ocean. Flipper goes off in search of help, but can't make anybody understand what he needs. Ulla Stromstedt appears as Ulla Norstrand, while Bud does not appear in the episode.
39	9	"Flipper and the Spy"	Ricou Browning	David C. Bruce	November 13, 1965
After a mishap with a space rocket, NASA reports a missing probe that has classified information on it. While Porter and Bud go in search on the high seas, Sandy is left at home to man the radio. But an official comes and orders Sandy and Flipper to help him search for it. The trouble is, the man is not who he seems.
40	10	"Dolphin Patrol"	Stanley Z. Cherry	Maria K. Little, James M. Buxbaum	November 20, 1965
After Hurricane Betsy hits the island, the waters are infested with sharks. Porter doesn't know it, but his sons are in grave danger when they try to go in search of a specimen to keep Bud from flunking Science. Ulla Stromstedt as Ulla Norstrand.
41	11	"A Job for Sandy"	Stanley Z. Cherry	Jess Carneol, Kay Lenard	November 27, 1965
Sandy has an opportunity to watch a stunt man perform an underwater stunt, but when the man injures his back, Sandy decides to take over the stunt without anyone's knowledge. Bud does not appear in the episode.
42	12	"Flipper and the Horse Thieves"	Paul Landres	Maria K. Little	December 4, 1965
Bud is showing Flipper to his friend Stevie. Meanwhile, two thieves steal away with Stevie's very valuable show horse. Flipper helps to get it back. The first of three episodes in which Sandy does not appear in season 2.
43	13	"Flipper and the Bounty"	Stanley Z. Cherry	Maria K. Little, Richard Tuber	December 11, 1965
Bud is fascinated when a replica of the historical ship the Bounty arrives at Coral Key Park. Without anyone's knowledge, he decides to sneak on board and explore. Note: the Bounty replica seen here was a casualty in 2012 of Hurricane Sandy.
44	14	"Shark Hunt"	Stanley Z. Cherry	Arthur Weiss	December 18, 1965
There is another shark breakout in the preserve, and Porter has his hands full with getting rid of them, saving stupid divers, closing the park to swimmers, and keeping Flipper alive. Bud does not appear in the episode.
45	15	"Flipper, the Detective"	Stanley Z. Cherry	Story by : Leonard B. Kaufman, Monroe Manning; Teleplay by : Monroe Manning	December 25, 1965
An eyewitness identifies Porter Ricks as being the man that robbed his boat, as the thief was an exact double for Porter (a dual role for Brian Kelly). Flipper and the boys must prove Porter's innocence.
46	16	"Flipper's Odyssey (1)"	Paul Landres	Maria K. Little	January 8, 1966
Flipper is captured by fishermen and brought to a marine exhibit more than 200 miles from Coral Key. When Porter and his sons find out, they hurriedly sail their boat up the coast searching for him. Meanwhile, Flipper tries to escape and find his way back home.
47	17	"Flipper's Odyssey (2)"	Paul Landres	Maria K. Little	January 15, 1966
When the Rickses, still searching for Flipper, catch up with a man rescued by Flipper in the previous episode, Sandy recounts for him how he first met and "adopted" Flipper when he came to the dolphin's rescue (in scenes from the first Flipper movie), gives a revisionist account of how Flipper later came to his aid (in a brief scene from Flipper's New Adventure), and recalls the show put on in part 3 of "Flipper and the Elephant" (with scenes thereof). Flipper, meanwhile, injured while fighting an alligator in aid of an Italian fisherman, is in turn aided by the man.
48	18	"Flipper's Odyssey (3)"	Paul Landres	Maria K. Little	January 22, 1966
When the Rickses are ready to give up on ever seeing Flipper again, a distraught Bud gets trapped in an underwater cave, and it's up to a recuperated Flipper to come to his rescue.
49	19	"Slingshot"	Paul Landres	Ricou Browning, Jack Cowden	January 29, 1966
The truck that Bud, his friend Stevie and Ulla Norstrand (Ulla Stromstedt) are driving in swerves off the road and lands in a drainage canal, trapping them inside shortly before the floodgates are scheduled to be opened. Flipper swims to try to save them.
50	20	"Flipper and the Shark Cage"	Ricou Browning	Story by : Leonard B. Kaufman, Monroe Manning; Teleplay by : Leonard B. Kaufman, Art Arthur	February 5, 1966
Bud disobeys his father and breaks a lot of rules, putting himself in grave danger inside a shark cage on the bottom of the ocean without anyone's knowledge.
51	21	"The Lobster Trap"	Ricou Browning	Peter L. Dixon, Laird Koenig	February 12, 1966
When Bud catches two teenagers trapping lobsters out of season, they threaten Sandy's run for school presidency to keep him quiet. Bud's silence later puts Flipper's life in grave danger.
52	22	"Air Power"	Ricou Browning	Jack Cowden	February 19, 1966
Sandy and Bud buy a used airboat with the intention of charging tourists for tours. But when they go into the everglades to mark their route, Flipper follows them and gets stuck under the hot sun.
53	23	"Gift Dolphin"	Paul Landres	Stanley H. Silverman	February 26, 1966
A visiting young near-teen prince takes a liking to Flipper — so much so that the American diplomat accompanying him orders that Flipper be given to the boy as a present, as a mark of friendship between the United States and the prince's country. Distraught by the news, Bud flees and is stung by a scorpion.
54	24	"The Raccoon Who Came to Dinner"	Ricou Browning	Story by : Ernest Spaulding, Teleplay by : Maria K. Little, Ernest Spaulding	March 5, 1966
A "higher-up" who has the power to shut the park down comes to visit the park and Porter Ricks. His hatred for wild animals, and Bud's dislike of him, just may put Porter's job in danger.
55	25	"Flipper Joins the Navy (1)"	Ricou Browning	Arthur Weiss	March 12, 1966
A troubled navy dolphin worth a million dollars is having nervous breakdowns. Porter and Flipper are called in to see if they can figure out how to help him. Guest Stars: Daniel J. Travanti as Commander Willard, Ulla Stromstedt as Ulla Norstrand. Sandy does not appear in the episode.
56	26	"Flipper Joins the Navy (2)"	Ricou Browning	Arthur Weiss	March 19, 1966
It seems everybody is out looking for the million-dollar dolphin who got away during a visit with the Rickses while recovering from a nervous breakdown. Guest Stars: Daniel J. Travanti as Commander Willard, Ulla Stromstedt as Ulla Norstrand. Sandy does not appear in the episode.
57	27	"Flipper's Underwater Museum"	Ricou Browning	Leonard B. Kaufman	March 26, 1966
A top secret transmitter is stolen by a spy, who hides it in an elaborate underwater display put together by Bud. Ulla Stromstedt as Ulla Norstrand, Martin E. Brooks as Kent
58	28	"Deep Waters"	Ricou Browning	Maria K. Little	April 2, 1966
Porter and Ulla (Ulla Stromstedt's final appearance) are in 'deep water' when the submarine they are in breaks down on the bottom of the ocean floor 250 feet down, with only one hour of oxygen for the marooned pair.
59	29	"Dolphin Love (1)"	Ricou Browning	Maria K. Little, James M. Buxbaum	April 9, 1966
Flipper has met the love of his life and would rather spend time with her instead of the Rickses. Bud is jealous and doesn't understand why his pet would abandon him for a girl. Introduces the female dolphin the Rickses would dub "Lorelei", seen again occasionally in season 3.
60	30	"Dolphin Love (2)"	Ricou Browning	Maria K. Little, James M. Buxbaum	April 16, 1966
Flipper is very upset at his girlfriend's injury and races to save her life. But he'll need the Rickses' help to do it. Continues the introduction of "Lorelei".

=== Season 3 (1966–67) ===
No. overall	No. in season	Title	Directed by	Written by	Original release date
61	1	"Agent Bud"	Ricou Browning	Maria K. Little, James M. Buxbaum	September 17, 1966
A plane crashes in the ocean with two men trapped inside and Flipper is the only one who knows where they are. Fortunately the plane is sealed tight so no water is inside, but how much air do they have left? Similar to the episode of Ivan Tors' earlier series Sea Hunt titled "Sixty Feet Below", its first aired episode. Note: An airing of "Agent Bud" on December 24, 1966 carried the note in TV Guide, "Postponed from an earlier date".
62	2	"Disaster in the Everglades (1)"	Ricou Browning	Maria K. Little	September 24, 1966
While checking on a poaching complaint, Porter is injured and captured by an alligator poacher and taken to his camp. When he's late for a camping trip with his sons, they worry and contact the coast guard. Huntz Hall as Barney.
63	3	"Disaster in the Everglades (2)"	Ricou Browning	Maria K. Little	October 1, 1966
While the boys wait on word from the Coast Guard on the whereabouts for their father and Flipper continues to search the ocean for the missing father, Porter tries to find a way to escape and get home. Huntz Hall as Barney.
64	4	"Lost Dolphin"	Joe Gannon	Robert Lees, Stanley H. Silverman	October 8, 1966
Bud disobeys Sandy and goes out to watch an explosion, which affects Flipper and gives him amnesia.
65	5	"The Warning"	Ricou Browning	Monroe Manning	October 15, 1966
The animals are acting strangely and even Flipper is heading out to sea. The boys tell their father, but he blows them off. Still, they believe something bad is just about to happen. Will they figure out WHAT in time?
66	6	"Cupid Flipper"	Ricou Browning	Maria K. Little, Monroe Manning	October 22, 1966
Sandy has met a girl he really likes, but she doesn't seem to want to spend time with him. Instead, she wants to spend time with Porter. Note: The girl was announced in pre-season publicity as Sandy's new girlfriend for season 3, although she only appears in this one episode.
67	7	"An Errand for Flipper"	Ricou Browning	Maria K.Little, Monroe Manning	October 29, 1966
Sandy sends Flipper on an important mission to deliver something to Porter he needs to repair the plane so he can make it to an important meeting in time. But Flipper has to make a few stops along the way.
68	8	"A Whale Ahoy"	Joseph Gannon	Maria K. Little, Monroe Manning	November 5, 1966
Bud has to write a book report on Moby Dick. While thinking about it at sea, he falls sleep in his skiff and has a strange dream. Before his eyes, Captain Peabody, a whale hunter, is about to harpoon a large gray whale but the whale flips the skiff over.
69	9	"Explosion"	Ricou Browning	Maria K. Little	November 12, 1966
A friend (Mart Hulswit) of Sandy's wants to earn some fast money to send his kid brother to school. He offers to help do some blasting by lying to the foreman after the professional they hired is critically injured. Richard O'Barry as Sam
70	10	"Executive Bud"	Joseph Gannon	Maria K. Little	November 19, 1966
Bud has formed his own business and hired other kids to do the work while he "supervises," only taking 1/3 of the cut for himself. But he's a hard taskmaster and gives no breaks. One of his charges cannot be found when he is injured inside a buoy.
71	11	"Flipper and the Puppy"	Ricou Browning	Maria K. Little, James M. Buxbaum	November 26, 1966
An injured man out at sea has to jump ship when his boat catches on fire. He's able to get his dog off, but the man floats away and when Porter and Sandy find him, the dog is nowhere to be found. But, Flipper is on the job. Heather MacRae as Anne
72	12	"Flipper's Island"	Brian Kelly	Sylvia Drake	December 3, 1966
Porter leaves the boys alone on an island he proposes to add to the park, to map it out for two days, in the hope that the island will be officially named after the family. But what Porter doesn't know is that they are not alone. Danger lurks very near, which soon ensnares Sandy and puts his life in jeopardy at the hands of a ruthless gunrunner's youthful nephew.
73	13	"Alligator Duel"	Ricou Browning	Story by : Peter L. Dixon; Teleplay by : Laird Koenig, Peter L. Dixon	December 10, 1966
After showing off, Flipper is stolen by some men trying to make a movies involving attacks of alligators. They want Flipper to be the star. Tommy Lane as Tom
74	14	"Flipper and the Fugitive (1)"	Joseph Gannon	Stanley H. Silverman	January 7, 1967
In the aftermath of a hurricane, Flipper discovers a man unconscious in his boat and tows the boat to a beach. Porter and Sandy rescue the man, actually a bank robber, and take him back to their home, unaware of who the stranger really is. When the thief's partner in crime arrives, the pair hold the Rickses hostage in their home. John Kerr as Keller.
75	15	"Flipper and the Fugitive (2)"	Joseph Gannon	Stanley H. Silverman	January 14, 1967
While the Rickses are being held hostage in their home, Flipper desperately tries to get someone to help them. John Kerr as Keller
76	16	"The Most Expensive Sardine in the World"	Ricou Browning	Peter L. Dixon, Laird Koenig	January 21, 1967
When a rich woman who is feeding sardines to Flipper drops her diamond bracelet in the water, Flipper is accused of swallowing it. He's in danger of being cut open to retrieve the expensive bauble by a court order. Guest Stars: Gloria DeHaven as Mrs. Sharp, Charles G. Martin as Enley.
77	17	"Flipper and the Seal"	Edward Haldeman	Maria K. Little, James M. Buxbaum	January 28, 1967
When some of Porter's underwater specimens come up missing, he blames a young drifter on the beach. Meanwhile, Bud is trying to develop a roll of film. Guest Star: Martin Sheen as Phil Adams
78	18	"Dolphins Don't Sleep"	Joseph Gannon	Peter L. Dixon, Laird Koenig	February 4, 1967
A specimen hunter pursuing a sawfish inadvertently shoots Flipper with his tranquilizer dart. But dolphins cannot sleep underwater. They boys must get Flipper the antidote before he drowns. Jean-Pierre Aumont as Guy Courtney
79	19	"Aunt Martha"	Ricou Browning	Maria K. Little	February 11, 1967
Porter's Aunt Martha has come to visit for the first time since Porter's wife died. She instantly decides to take over, and her first order of business is sending Flipper out to sea because she believes all wild animals can be dangerous. Doris Dowling as Aunt Martha
80	20	"Dolphin for Ransom"	Joseph Gannon	Maria Little, Monroe Manning	February 18, 1967
When Porter orders a teenager to be in court early Monday morning for poaching lobsters, he tries to coerce Porter by stealing Flipper and holding him for the ransom of dropping the charges.
81	21	"A Dolphin in Time"	Edward Haldeman	Maria K. Little, James M. Buxbaum	February 25, 1967
Scott Emson is trying to study sharks, but Flipper doesn't seem to understand that he doesn't want to be rescued from them! The danger becomes real, though, when the diver inadvertently borrows an air tank full of deadly carbon monoxide. James Patterson as Scott Emson. The borrowing of a tank full of carbon monoxide is similar to the Sea Hunt episode "Lord Cristobal".
82	22	"Decision for Bud"	Ricou Browning	Maria K. Little	March 4, 1967
A scientist goes to Bud to ask his permission to take Flipper for a special study. He and Bud make a deal to provide a scholarship for Sandy, but then Flipper is called upon to help find a missing diver.
83	23	"The Firing Line (1)"	Ricou Browning	Peter L. Dixon, Laird Koenig	March 11, 1967
Porter leaves Sandy and Bud in charge while he goes to take care of some business for the day. He even tells them that they can open his mail when it comes. They do as instructed, only to find a check that says "termination pay" on it. Bud and Sandy are distressed about having to leave Coral Key, so they set out to find their father a job. You wouldn't think they could get into any trouble but... Guest Star: David Soul as Dennis Blake.
84	24	"The Firing Line (2)"	Ricou Browning	Peter L. Dixon, Laird Koenig	March 18, 1967
Sandy and Bud took a short cut on the way to their errand and end up in the middle of an active firing range. While they are stuck there being bombarded after their motor is struck, Porter Ricks desperately looks for his boys, and tries to save them from being killed.
85	25	"Devil Ray"	Joseph Gannon	Maria K. Little, James M. Buxbaum	March 25, 1967
A large stingray has shown up in Coral Key park and everyone is afraid of it. Porter is told he must get rid of it — one way or another.
86	26	"Cap'n Flint"	Brian Kelly	Maria K. Little, Monroe Manning	April 1, 1967
There's trouble brewing when Cap'n Flint, a talking parrot, gets loose on his raft and floats right into the area where an explosion is about to happen. Guest star: Robin Mattson as Robin James.
87	27	"Flipper's New Friends (1)"	Ricou Browning	Robert Lees, Stanley H. Silverman	April 8, 1967
A new family, the Whitmans, moves into the park, and Flipper befriends the family's two children. But their curiosity gets them stranded on an island and nobody knows where they are. Guest Stars: Stuart Getz as Dirk Whitman, Karen Steele as Fran Whitman. The plot of the stranded children is similar to the Sea Hunt episode "The Lost Ones".
88	28	"Flipper's New Friends (2)"	Ricou Browning	Robert Lees, Stanley H. Silverman	April 15, 1967
Flipper and the Whitmans' dog try to get help to the two lost children stranded on a deserted island. Meanwhile, Sandy and Bud each prepare to leave Coral Key, and will be saying goodbye to their beloved dolphin friend. Guest Stars: Stuart Getz as Dirk Whitman, Karen Steele as Fran Whitman.
