= Movie Star, American Style or; LSD, I Hate You =

- Theatrical release poster
- Directed by: Albert Zugsmith
- Written by: Albert Zugsmith; Graham Lee Mahin
- Produced by: Robert Caramico
- Edited by: Herman Freedman
- Production company: Famous Players Corp.
- Release date: 1966
- Running time: 99 mins
- Country: United States
- Language: English

Movie Star, American Style or; LSD, I Hate You is a 1966 American comedy film directed by Albert Zugsmith and starring Robert Strauss and Del Moore. It was written by Zugsmith and Graham Lee Mahin. Harry M. Benshoff called the film "a sex farce about the current excesses of Hollywood starlets."

== Plot ==
Mentally unbalanced psychiatrist Dr. Horatio is looking after movie star and Marilyn Monroe look-alike Honey Bunny after her latest suicide attempt. While she is undergoing his LSD-assisted therapy, producer Joe Horner tries to get her back to work.

== Cast ==
- Robert Strauss as Joe Horner
- Del Moore as Dr. Horatio
- T. C. Jones as Skippy Roper
- Steve Drexel as Dr. Oscar Roscoe
- Paula Lane as Honey Bunny
- Steve Rogers as Barry James
- Richard Clair as David Erickson
- Jill Darling as Miranda Song
- Cara Garnett as movie queen
- Sandra Lynn as Countess Marie Duvarre

== Reception ==
Variety wrote: "Occasionally sophisticated and also relying on some inside gags that would register only in Hollywood, the Albert Zugsmith film is basically an okay slapstick satire on contemporary sex symbols and psychiatry heightened by optical and musical gimmicks ...Pic makes no lavish production pretense, and there are none. The LSD scene, while no great social commentary, is, in its own way, sufficiently offbeat to give an audience pause. This is because no one likes to appear the fool, but, to a turned-off person, another who is turned on is just that."

Boxoffice wrote: "This Albert Zugsmith-Famous Players effort, teaming some of the readily recognizable comedy talents on the Hollywood scene, among them Robert Strauss, plus some lithesome lovelies, should find admirably paced acceptance in the larger, more cosmopolitan centers. ... Gratifyingly, the film is played for laugh effects and doesn't attempt any significant soul-searching. Zugsmith has directed with wryly winning touches, stressing at all times constant movement within the sphere and scope of frenetic 'show biz'."
