= Five Miles to Midnight =

1962 film by Anatole Litvak

- The VHS cover
- Directed by: Anatole Litvak
- Written by: Maurice Druon; André Versini
- Screenplay by: Peter Viertel; Hugh Wheeler
- Produced by: Anatole Litvak; Louis Wipf
- Starring: Sophia Loren; Anthony Perkins
- Cinematography: Henri Alekan
- Edited by: Bert Bates; Ginou Dodard
- Music by: Mikis Theodorakis; Jacques Loussier; Giuseppe Mengozzi
- Distributed by: United Artists
- Release date: 12 December 1962 (France)
- Running time: 110 minutes
- Countries: France, Italy, United States
- Language: English

Five Miles to Midnight (French: Le Couteau dans la plaie, literally The Knife in the wound) is a 1962 Franco-Italian international co-production drama film produced and directed by Anatole Litvak. It starred Sophia Loren and Anthony Perkins. It was produced through Filmsonor S.A., Dear Film Produzione and Mercury, and distributed by United Artists.

== Plot ==
Immediately after Lisa declares that she is leaving her unbalanced, jealous, and abusive husband Robert, he is reported dead in a plane crash.

Secretly still alive, he convinces her to collect his life insurance and turn it over to him, promising he'll go away. Lisa reluctantly follows through but must contend with the complications of the scheme which involve an aggressive and curious suitor, an on-looking and loose-lipped neighbor boy, Robert's jealousy and manipulation, and her own guilt.

After Robert renegs on their agreement, and informs her they will always be together, Lisa runs him over and drags his lifeless body into a nearby river. Later, as she confesses her crimes and her motivation in the presence of her inquisitive suitor, he realizes she's having a mental breakdown and phones a doctor.

The film takes place primarily in Paris. Lisa is Italian; Robert is American.

== Cast ==
- Sophia Loren as Lisa Macklin
- Anthony Perkins as Robert Macklin
- Gig Young as David Barnes
- Jean-Pierre Aumont as Alan Stewart
- Yolande Turner as Barbara Ford
- Tommy Norden as Johnny
- Pascale Roberts as The Streetwalker
- Mathilde Casadesus as Mme. Duval the Concierge
- Billy Kearns as Captain Wade

== Production ==
The film was directed by Anatole Litvak and produced by Litvak and Louis Wipf from a screenplay by Peter Viertel and Hugh Wheeler with dialogue by Maurice Druon, based on an idea by André Versini. The musical score was written by Mikis Theodorakis and includes music by Jacques Loussier and Giuseppe Mengozzi. The cinematography was by Henri Alekan.

The film stars Sophia Loren and Anthony Perkins, with Gig Young, Jean-Pierre Aumont, Yolande Turner, and Tommy Norden.

== Reception ==
Dilys Powell in The Sunday Times dismissed it as "a pretty glum experience". Patrick Gibbs in The Daily Telegraph called it "silly and stuffy".
