= The Cage (Star Trek: The Original Series) =

First pilot of Star Trek: The Original Series

- Star Trek: The Original Series episode
- Episode no.: Episode 1
- Directed by: Robert Butler
- Written by: Gene Roddenberry
- Production codes: 001 – restored version; 099 – original version
- Original air dates: February 1965 (first screened to NBC); October 14, 1986 (VHS release); October 15, 1988 (TV premiere; restored to full color)

"The Cage" is the first pilot episode of the American television series Star Trek. It was completed on January 22, 1965 (with a copyright date of 1964). The episode was written by Gene Roddenberry and directed by Robert Butler. In February 1965, NBC rejected it, and the network ordered another pilot episode, which became "Where No Man Has Gone Before." Much of the original footage from "The Cage" was later incorporated into the season 1 two-part episode "The Menagerie" (1966); "The Cage" was first released to the public on VHS in 1986, with a special introduction by Gene Roddenberry, as a hybrid of the color footage that was used in "The Menagerie" and black and white footage which was not used in "The Menagerie." It was first broadcast on television in its complete all-color form in 1988. The black and white and all-color versions were also released in various home media formats, including LaserDisc, VHS, DVD, and Blu-ray.

The story concerns a starship crew's investigation of a far-off planet, which was the site of a shipwreck eighteen years earlier, and their encounter with telepathic aliens who seek a human male specimen for their menagerie. The pilot introduced Mr. Spock, played by Leonard Nimoy, the only cast member retained for the series in his original role.

== Overview ==
"The Cage" has many of the features of the eventual series, but there are numerous differences. The captain of the starship USS Enterprise is not James T. Kirk, but Christopher Pike. Spock is present, but not as first officer. That role is taken by a character named Number One, played by Majel Barrett. Spock's character differs somewhat from that seen in the rest of Star Trek, displaying a youthful eagerness that contrasts with the later, more reserved and logical Spock. He also delivers the first line in all of Star Trek: "Check the circuit!" followed by, "Can't be the screen then." The weaponry used in the pilot also differs from that seen in the series proper, identified as lasers rather than phasers, and different props are used for the communicator and handheld weapons.

NBC reportedly called the pilot "too cerebral," "too intellectual", and "too slow" with "not enough action." Rather than rejecting the series outright, though, the network commissioned a second pilot, "Where No Man Has Gone Before," which led to an order for the series for fall 1966.

== Footage repurposed for a series ==
During the first season, the need for new episodes to be delivered to the network to meet airdates became urgent, and a framing story with the series regulars was written around most of the original footage from "The Cage", resulting in the two-part episode "The Menagerie".

The process of editing the pilot into "The Menagerie" disassembled the original camera negative of "The Cage", and thus, it was considered partly lost for many years. Roddenberry's black-and-white 16mm print made for reference purposes was the only existing print of the show and was frequently shown at conventions. Early video releases of "The Cage" used Roddenberry's 16mm print, intercut with the color scenes from "The Cage" that were used in "The Menagerie". It was only in 1987 that a film archivist found an unmarked (mute) 35mm reel in a Hollywood film laboratory with the negative trims of the unused scenes. Upon realizing what he had found, he arranged to return the footage to Roddenberry's company.

According to "The Menagerie", "The Cage" events occurred thirteen years before the first season of Star Trek, in 2254. No stardate was given.

== Plot ==
The U.S.S. Enterprise, under the command of Captain Christopher Pike, receives a distress call from the fourth planet in the Talos star group. Despite Pike's misgivings, he authorizes a rescue mission and assembles a landing party, including Science Officer Spock. Tracking the distress signal to its source, the landing party discovers a camp of elderly male survivors from the Columbia, a scientific vessel that has been missing for eighteen years. Amongst the survivors is a beautiful young woman named Vina.

Captivated by her beauty, Pike is caught off guard and falls into a trap set by the native Talosians, a race of humanoids with bulbous heads who live beneath the planet's surface. It is revealed that both the distress call and the crash survivors (except for Vina) are telepathic illusions created by the Talosians to lure the Enterprise to the planet. While imprisoned, Pike uncovers the Talosians' plans to force Pike and Vina to mate so they may breed a race of slaves and expand their dying civilization to the formerly barren world above.

The Talosians use their powers to tempt Pike; first, by playing on his sense of duty by dressing Vina as a Rigellian princess in distress, then appealing to his homesickness by placing her on a lush, green Earth farm. Finally, they transform her into a seductive, green-skinned Orion dancing girl, and Pike's resolve weakens. Number One, the Enterprise's first officer, is captured trying to beam down to the planet with Pike's yeoman and placed in his cell. Pike, exploiting the Talosians' inability to read through "primitive" emotions such as hatred, is able to free the group and take the Talosian Keeper hostage.

The Keeper points out that escape is hopeless, as the Talosians have already accessed and sabotaged the Enterprise. Pike is willing to stay with Vina in exchange for the others' freedom, but Number One then sets her weapon to explode and states that she would sooner die than be enslaved; Pike prepares to do the same. This confirms what the Talosians have learned from probing the Enterprise's computers: humans hate captivity too much to be useful. The Keeper despairs that without Pike, their people are doomed to extinction.

Pike sends the others back, but the Talosians decline his offers of help as they fear the consequences of sharing their mental abilities. Pike then asks Vina to leave with him, but Vina explains that she cannot leave. The Columbia had indeed crash-landed on Talos IV; Vina was the sole survivor but was badly injured. The Talosians healed her, but due to their unfamiliarity with human anatomy, she was left permanently disfigured. She is able to maintain her beauty and health only with the help of the Talosians and their illusions.

Having a proper understanding of humanity, the Talosians grant Vina an illusion of Pike as a companion so that she may live out her days in peace. The Keeper sends Pike off with these words: "She has an illusion, and you have reality. May you find your way as pleasant."

== Cast ==
- Jeffrey Hunter as Captain Christopher Pike
- Leonard Nimoy as Mr. Spock
- Majel Barrett as Number One
- John Hoyt as Dr. Philip Boyce
- Susan Oliver as Vina
- Meg Wyllie as The Keeper
  - Malachi Throne as The Keeper (voice)
- Peter Duryea as Lieutenant José Tyler
- Laurel Goodwin as Yeoman J. M. Colt
- Clegg Hoyt as Transporter Chief Pitcairn
- Michael Dugan as The Kaylar
- Georgia Schmidt as First Talosian
  - Robert C. Johnson as First Talosian (voice)
- Serena Sande as Second Talosian
- Jon Lormer as Dr. Theodore Haskins
- Adam Roarke as C.P.O. Garrison
- Leonard Mudie as Second Survivor
- Anthony Jochim as Third Survivor
- Ed Madden as Enterprise Geologist
- Robert Phillips as Space Officer (Orion)
- Joseph Mell as Earth Trader
- Janos Prohaska as Anthropoid Ape / Humanoid Bird

== Casting ==
Jeffrey Hunter had a six-month exclusive option for the role of Captain Pike. Although he was required to continue if the network picked up the series at that time, he did not have to film the second pilot that NBC requested. Wanting to focus on his more productive film career, Hunter declined to return and was replaced by the character of James T. Kirk as portrayed by William Shatner. Gene Roddenberry wrote to him on April 5, 1965:

I am told you have decided not to go ahead with Star Trek. This has to be your own decision, of course, and I must respect it. You may be certain I hold no grudge or ill feelings and expect to continue to reflect publicly and privately the high regard I learned for you during the production of our pilot.

Two weeks after the option expired on June 1, 1965, Hunter formally gave his letter requesting separation from the project. Although Captain Pike was set to return for a guest appearance in the episode "The Menagerie," Hunter could not reprise the role, so a stand-in was used instead. He died on May 27, 1969, one week before the original series ended its run.

Roddenberry later suggested that he was the one who—unhappy with interference by Hunter's then-wife Dusty Bartlett—had decided not to rehire Hunter; however, executive producer Herbert F. Solow, who was present when Bartlett, acting as manager, refused the role on behalf of her husband, later said in his memoir, Inside Star Trek, that it was the other way around.

== Production ==
"The Cage" was filmed at Desilu Productions' studio (now known as Culver Studios) in Culver City, California, from November 27 to December 18, 1964. Post-production work (pick-up shots, editing, scoring, special photographic and sound effects) continued to January 18, 1965.

Gene Roddenberry paid much attention to what The Outer Limits team was doing then and was often present in their studios. He hired several Outer Limits alumni, including Robert Justman and Wah Chang, to produce Star Trek. One of the creatures in the cages was reused from the episode "The Duplicate Man" of The Outer Limits, where it was called a megasoid. The prop head from The Outer Limits episode "Fun and Games" was used to make a Talosian appear as a vicious creature. The process used to make pointed ears for David McCallum in "The Sixth Finger" was reused in Star Trek for certain humanoid characters, such as Spock. The "ion storm" seen in "The Mutant" (a projector beam shining through a container holding glitter in liquid suspension) became the transporter effect.

The Talosians were designed with an androgynous look and were portrayed by females with male actors providing dubbing audio. This was done to give the impression that the Talosians had focused their efforts on mental development to the detriment of their physical strength and size, making them suitably alien to viewers. However, the deep voice of Malachi Throne as the Keeper in "The Cage" was electronically processed to sound higher-pitched for "The Menagerie," as Throne also portrayed Commodore Mendez in the latter. The Keeper's voice from "The Menagerie" was kept for both the remastered and some "original" versions of "The Cage," which would be released later.

== Releases and availability ==
"The Cage" was first released on VHS in 1986, with a special introduction by Roddenberry, and was aired for the first time in its entirety, and in full color, in late 1988 as part of The Star Trek Saga: From One Generation to the Next, a two-hour retrospective special hosted by Patrick Stewart.

Although most of this episode was edited into the original series episode "The Menagerie" (aired November 1966), no stand-alone version of "The Cage" pilot was available until a 1986 VHS release. Gene Roddenberry had a black-and-white workprint on 16 mm film, and the original 35 mm negative had been cut up in editing for "The Menagerie." This left Roddenberry's copy as the only known surviving version when the VHS version was made. Thus, the original VHS release has a mix of full-color from existing footage with black-and-white from the 16 mm copy. Also in 1986, "The Cage" was released on LaserDisc in the United States; this version mixed B&W and color footage and 9 minutes of introduction and closing with Roddenberry, making the runtime 73 minutes.

In 1987, the excised film sections were discovered by Bob Furmanek, an archivist, in an abandoned, unlabeled film canister at a film laboratory in Los Angeles. He arranged to return the footage to Gene Roddenberry, thus making it possible to complete a full-color version. The restored color version was broadcast in October 1988, the first television airing of "The Cage." It was broadcast as part of a television special hosted by Patrick Stewart called The Star Trek Saga: From One Generation to the Next. It contained interviews with Gene Roddenberry, Maurice Hurley, Rick Berman, Mel Harris, and cast members from Star Trek and Star Trek: The Next Generation, along with clips from both series and the Star Trek films I through IV, with a small preview of Star Trek V. It was rebroadcast on UPN in 1996, with a behind-the-scenes look at Star Trek: First Contact.

On October 10, 1990, a Collector's Edition of "The Cage" with a runtime of 64 minutes featuring all-color footage, minus the Roddenberry introduction and closing, was released on LaserDisc in the US.

"The Cage" was first broadcast in the United Kingdom on BBC2 on 19 August 1992. On 19 August 1996, "The Cage" was broadcast on BBC2 on the first day of a season of programmes on the 30th anniversary of Star Trek.

Two VHS versions were released in the United Kingdom, one version being of the restored color version.

"The Cage" was released on PAL LaserDisc in the United Kingdom as part of The Pilots collection in April 1996. This included the color version of "The Cage", "Where No Man Has Gone Before", "Encounter at Farpoint", "Emissary", and "Caretaker" with a total runtime of 379 minutes.

Both versions of "The Cage" were included in the original-series Season 3 DVD and Blu-ray box sets, along with the introduction by Roddenberry.

The B&W/color version of "The Cage" was initially listed as episode 1 on VHS covers upon its initial home video release. When the all-color version was found and released later, it was designated "episode 99". When released on the DVD format in 2001, the designations were reversed as the DVD cover for Volume 40 describes the all-color version as "episode 1" and the hybrid as "episode 99". These reversed designations have been followed on future DVD, Blu-ray, and streaming presentations.

== Reception ==
In 1996, in a review of the episode in The Times, Elizabeth Cowley said it was "unintentionally hilarious", but Star Trek fans would enjoy watching it.

In 2010, SciFiNow ranked this the third-best episode of the original series.

In 2016, SyFy ranked "The Cage" as the fifth best out of six Star Trek TV show pilots, with Star Trek: Deep Space Nine's "Emissary" in first place.

In 2017, Inverse recommended "The Cage" as "essential watching" for Star Trek: Discovery.

In 2023, Den of Geek ranked "The Cage" as the best pilot episode for any series in the franchise.

== Follow-up and spin-off ==
In 2019, the Star Trek: Discovery episode "If Memory Serves" saw Pike and Spock (now portrayed by Anson Mount and Ethan Peck, respectively) return to Talos IV; the recap at the beginning of the episode used scenes from "The Cage."

CBS All Access officially ordered Star Trek: Strange New Worlds to series in May 2020, featuring the characters of Captain Pike, Number One, and Spock. At 55 years between The Cage and the announcement of Strange New Worlds, co-showrunner and executive producer Henry Alonso Myers calls this the longest pilot-to-series pickup in television history.

== See also ==
- List of Star Trek episodes
- Star Trek: Strange New Worlds, the 2022 television series based on The Cage.
