= Flipper (1964 TV series) =

American TV series (1964–1967)

- Genre: Children's television; Adventure; Drama
- Created by: Jack Cowden; Ricou Browning
- Directed by: Ricou Browning
- Starring: Brian Kelly; Luke Halpin; Tommy Norden; Andy Devine; Ulla Strömstedt; Flipper
- Music by: Henry Vars; Samuel Matlovsky; Ruby Raksin
- Country of origin: United States
- Original language: English
- No. of seasons: 3
- No. of episodes: 88 (list of episodes)

Production
- Producers: Ivan Tors; James Buxbaum
- Cinematography: Howard Winner; Clifford H. Poland Jr.
- Running time: approx. 25 minutes
- Production companies: Ivan Tors Films, Inc. MGM Television

Original release
- Network: NBC
- Release: September 19, 1964 – April 15, 1967

Related
- Flipper – The New Adventures

Flipper is an American television program broadcast on NBC from September 19, 1964, until April 15, 1967. Flipper, a bottlenose dolphin, is the pet of Porter Ricks, chief warden at Coral Key Park and Marine Preserve (a fictional version of John Pennekamp Coral Reef State Park in Key Largo, Florida), and his two young sons, Sandy and Bud. The show has been dubbed an "aquatic Lassie", and a considerable amount of children's merchandise inspired by the show was produced during its first run.

== Production ==
The television show is an extension of the 1963 film Flipper starring Chuck Connors and Luke Halpin as Porter and Sandy Ricks, and of its 1964 sequel, Flipper's New Adventure. For the second film, the producers scripted that Mrs. Ricks had died, making Porter now a single parent, with Brian Kelly taking over the role as Porter Ricks, but now as a trainee park ranger rather than a fisherman. In adapting the films to a television series, the producers gave Porter a second, younger son, Bud, portrayed by Tommy Norden, and the TV series has Porter returning permanently to the Florida Keys as the park ranger of the Coral Key Marine Preserve. The producers also departed from the films by endowing Flipper with an unnatural degree of intelligence and an extraordinary understanding of human motives, behavior, and vocabulary.

The show was created, by way of the creation of the first film, by Jack Cowden and Ricou Browning, the latter of whom had experience in underwater filming and underwater performance, notably as the monster in Creature from the Black Lagoon. In Browning's second filmed portrayal of the creature, Revenge of the Creature, a scene showcases one of the film's shooting locations, Marineland of Florida (depicted with a fictionalized name), presenting several stunts performed by "Flippy, the Educated Porpoise", in a form of product placement. Browning also wrote the book Flipper based on the ancient legend of Taras, a mythical founder of the Spartan city-state of the same name (on the coast of Italy where modern day Taranto is located), who was rescued from shipwreck by a dolphin sent by Poseidon, which was picked up and adapted by famous producer Ivan Tors into the first Flipper movie.

=== Filming locations ===
Flipper was filmed in Miami at Greenwich Studios (at the time called Ivan Tors Studios) at 12100 Ivan Tors Boulevard in Miami, Florida, and at Key Biscayne, Florida. Nassau was an occasional location, especially for underwater footage. The show was produced in co-operation with the Miami Seaquarium, an aquarium also located on Key Biscayne in Miami.

The show used two different Thunderbird Iroquois boats as picture boats, a 22' model with all white upholstery and a single porthole on the sides of the cuddy for the first two seasons, and upgraded to a 23' model in the third season with two-tone upholstery and two portholes on the sides of the cuddy.

Miami Seaquarium still presents the Flipper Show, a dolphin show in the lagoon that served as the film location for the show.

The Miami Seaquarium set where Flipper was filmed also served as the set of another Ivan Tors production, Gentle Ben; the house where the Ricks family lived was the same house used for the Wedloe family on Gentle Ben. Flipper was moved to Jimbo's Shrimp (also known as Jimbo's Place), located across from Miami Seaquarium, into the care and exercise of James "Jimbo" Luznar. Sr. Flipper lived in a pen in the cove behind Jimbo's Shrimp.

=== Role of Flipper ===
Flipper was portrayed at first by a female dolphin named Susie, though mostly by another female, Kathy, and occasionally by other females named Patty, Scotty, and Squirt. Female dolphins were chosen because they are less aggressive than males and their skins (unlike the skins of male dolphins) are usually free from scars and other disfigurations acquired in altercations with other dolphins, making their passing for the identical "Flipper" easier. The five dolphins performed all of Flipper's scenes except the famous tail walk, a trick they were unable to master completely. A male dolphin named Clown was brought in for scenes involving the tail walk. The famous "voice" of Flipper was actually the sped-up song of a kookaburra. Dolphins produce sound by vibrating membranes in their nasal passage called "phonic lips" which are specialized for whistles and echolocation "clicks."

=== Music ===
The show's theme tune was credited to Henry Vars with lyrics by By Dunham. In France, the melody was known as "La Romance de Paris" ("The Love Song of Paris"). The first five episodes of the second season featured a different version of the theme, with Frankie Randall singing new lyrics. After those episodes, the original style of the theme was brought back. The background music of the long underwater sequences was inspired by Ravel's "Daphnis and Chloe".

=== Broadcast history ===
Filming began in the early summer of 1964, and the first episode of season one was broadcast on September 19, 1964, with the series ending with the 28th episode of season three being broadcast on April 15, 1967, showing on NBC Saturday nights 7:30–8:00 pm, making 88 episodes in total. NBC continued broadcasts with repeats from season three until September 1967. One episode (episode three in season one, called "SOS Dolphin") was filmed earlier in 1964 as a pilot immediately after the filming of Flipper's New Adventure was completed. Brian Kelly appeared in all 88 episodes, Luke Halpin was in 85, and Tommy Norden was in 84. Later, reruns of the first two seasons aired January 1968 – June 1968, NBC, Sunday 6:30–7:00 pm and June 1968 – September 1968, NBC, Sunday 7:00–7:30 pm.

In its debut season in the 1964–65 United States network television schedule, Flipper was a considerable ratings success, rating in the top 25, especially going up against the long-standing and popular The Jackie Gleason Show on CBS. Ratings declined only slightly in season two 1965–66 United States network television schedule buoyed by its proximity to NBC's popular new Saturday night shows I Dream of Jeannie and Get Smart. Ratings fell sharply in season three against a strong rise in ratings for Gleason's show.

== Characters and cast ==
=== Animal cast ===
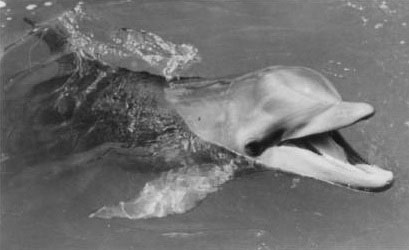
Flipper the Dolphin

- Flipper is a bottlenose dolphin and the companion animal of the Ricks family. Flipper is an extraordinarily intelligent dolphin that helps enforce regulations in the preserve, assists Porter Ricks with rescues at sea, and keeps a watchful eye on Sandy and Bud, whom he has rescued or helped rescue from danger on numerous occasions. Flipper was portrayed by five different dolphins; the most commonly used ones were named "Kathy" and "Susie".
- Pelican Pete, a pelican, who was depicted in the original movie as Sandy's pet before he met Flipper, had a recurring role on the show, and appeared in several episodes.
- Other animals appearing on the show included a Chesapeake Bay Retriever named Spray (real name was Chobee from Okeechobee, Florida) (seen only in a few early episodes), a seal, a baby elephant, alligators, a female albino dolphin (whose baby Flipper fathered during her only appearance, in the "The White Dolphin" episode), and another female dolphin, introduced at the end of the second season, dubbed "Lorelei" by the Ricks family. Lorelei became Flipper's "girlfriend".

=== Human cast ===
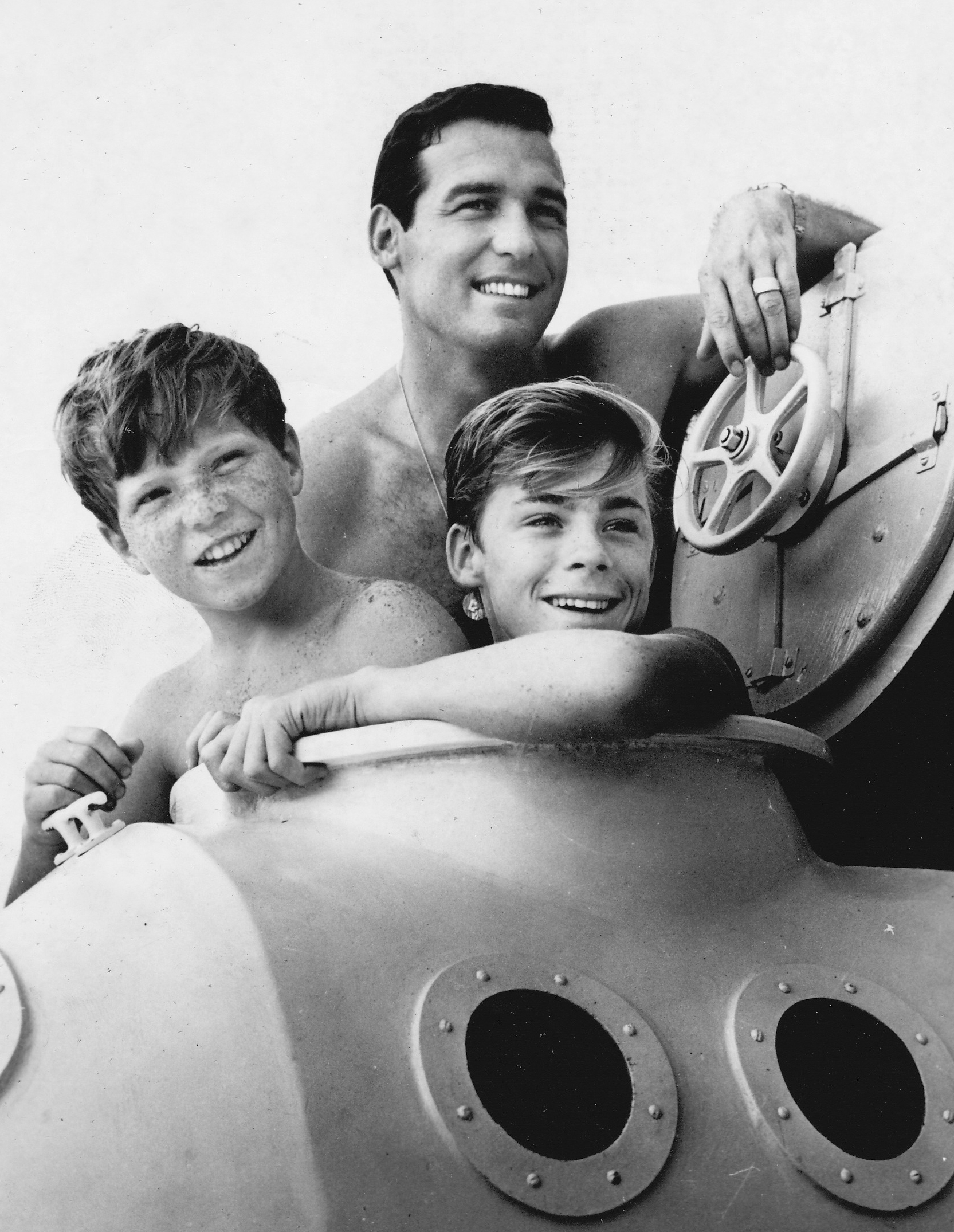
Clockwise from top: Brian Kelly, Luke Halpin and Tommy Norden.
- Porter Ricks: Brian Kelly fills the show's moral center with his portrayal of Porter Ricks, a loving father, conscientious government employee, rugged outdoorsman, and all-around good guy. Porter is a widowed father with two sons, Sandy and Bud, and is employed as chief warden and park ranger at the fictional Coral Key Park and Marine Preserve in southern Florida. Kelly replaced Chuck Connors (the original Porter Ricks in the first movie Flipper) in the second movie, Flipper's New Adventure, although he was then only at park ranger training school. Reflecting on Porter being single, Brian Kelly told TV Guide (July 9, 1966): "I'm going to bring a couple of bikini girls on. I want some groovy-lookin' girls because a lot of fathers who see the show say, "Where are the chicks?" Porter's parenting style is firm yet fun, with the dad involving his boys (particularly the older son, Sandy) in his various exciting waterborne tasks as a park ranger, all the while gladly allowing Flipper to befriend his sons and help with various crucial rescue efforts.
- Sandy Ricks: Luke Halpin plays Porter's elder son, Sandy. Sandy begins season one as an outdoorsy, athletic teenager sometimes given to boyish mishaps and poor choices (although usually more responsible than his impish younger brother Bud), and ends season three as old enough for adult responsibilities and duties. Sandy often accompanies his father on dangerous adventures and rescues at and under the sea. The character of Sandy is carried over from both the feature films (Halpin was the sole lead actor/character to appear in both movies and the entire TV series), where he was the one who first met Flipper and became his special friend. Halpin became an expert diver, thus was able to perform the extensive water-related scenes throughout the series, largely without stunt doubles. Halpin's role as Sandy Ricks catapulted him to the rarefied atmosphere of teen super-stardom, a status bolstered by his frequent appearances in just cutoff blue jeans showing his tanned, athletic swimmer's build, blond hair, and model-quality telegenic looks.
- Bud Ricks: Redheaded, freckle-faced Tommy Norden portrayed the younger son, Bud, a character created specifically for the TV series. He begins season one as an impish 10-year-old boy who has a difficult time staying out of trouble. Many episodes revolve around mistakes made by Bud, intentionally or unintentionally, and his need to be rescued from the consequences. Bud is gullible and easily swallows the tall tales Hap Gorman feeds him. Bud is at home on or near the sea, and loves animals of all sorts. Flipper is his special companion, and he ends season three as a 13-year-old able to do more of the work that his older brother Sandy does.
- Hap Gorman: Andy Devine appeared five times in the show's first season as an old salt and marine carpenter named Hap Gorman. Hap was something of a bungler, who tried Porter's patience. Hap, in the traditional vein for Andy Devine, enjoyed spinning yarns and tall tales about bejeweled maharajahs, faraway kingdoms, and exotic ports for the amusement of skeptical Sandy and gullible Bud.
- Ulla Norstrand: Swedish-born actress Ulla Strömstedt appeared 12 times in the second season as Ulla Norstrand, an oceanographer whose work frequently took her to Coral Key Park and Marine Preserve. She was often instrumental in enforcing the park's regulations. One of her trademarks was her miniature yellow submarine which she was often seen using in her oceanographic explorations, and which was sometimes pivotal in storylines. She was a potential love interest for Porter Ricks, although no serious relationship was ever shown to develop.
- Warden Ed Dennis was portrayed by Miami actor Dan Chandler. The recurring role of a Coral Key Park game warden was created by writer Maria K. Little, who needed a sidekick to play off of Porter Ricks. Dennis performed such sidekick chores as helping find a kidnapped Flipper and saving Porter Ricks from murderous lobster poachers. Chandler also appeared in the feature films Flipper and Flipper's New Adventure.
- Sheriff, also Old Man Coleman, were two roles portrayed by actor Eric Applewhite, appearing in five episodes across all three seasons of the TV series. His older brother George Applewhite played the Sheriff in the original Flipper.

=== Notable guest stars ===
Flipper was notable for the casting of a number of guest actors, several of whom went on to stardom in later years or had already had a stellar career.

- John Abbott
- Jean-Pierre Aumont
- James Best
- Martin E. Brooks
- Michael Conrad
- Lynda Day George
- Gloria DeHaven
- Doris Dowling
- Barbara Feldon
- Stuart Getz
- Huntz Hall
- Margaret Hayes
- Karl Held
- Betsy Jones-Moreland
- Robin Mattson
- Cheryl Miller
- Denise Nickerson
- Robert Reilly
- Burt Reynolds
- Martin Sheen
- Julie Sommars
- David Soul
- Karen Steele
- Bo Svenson
- Marshall Thompson
- Daniel J. Travanti
- Diana Van der Vlis
- Wende Wagner
- Jessica Walter
- Dan White

== Plot ==
The Ricks cottage at Coral Key Park and Marine Preserve

The series follows a bottlenose dolphin named Flipper who is the wild pet of Porter Ricks, a park warden, and his sons, Sandy (15) and Bud (10). Flipper lives in a lagoon near the Ricks cottage at Coral Key Park and Marine Preserve. With the Ricks family, Flipper helps protect the park and preserve and its wild inhabitants. He is also instrumental in apprehending criminals and thugs in the park. Flipper is generally recognized by the characters in the show (and the theme song) as being a particularly intelligent and capable dolphin. Flipper is the special companion of the youngest member of the Ricks family, Bud, and several episodes feature Flipper rescuing Bud from dangerous situations. Flipper is able to somehow communicate through different chatter-like tones, head nods and shakes, and other attention-seeking antics with Sandy and Bud, and draw their (and Porter's) attention to danger or in the direction of people needing help. Few women are in the lives of the Ricks males, but in the first season, Porter does have a date, and Sandy falls for the girl operator of a floating zoo, who appears in four episodes. A female oceanographer enters the series in the second season to add a feminine touch to the proceedings, but little more than mild flirtations and fondness between Porter and her ensues. Promotional material for the third season announced a new girlfriend for Sandy, although she only appeared in one episode, and he has an innocently flirtatious scene with another girl in a separate episode. The series is distinguished for its lush photography of subtropical Florida and its colorful underwater sequences.

== Episodes ==
Season	Episodes	Originally released	
Season	Episodes	First released	Last released
1	30	September 19, 1964	April 10, 1965
2	30	September 18, 1965	April 16, 1966
3	28	September 17, 1966	April 15, 1967

== Cancellation and subsequent history ==
The last first-run episode of Flipper aired April 15, 1967. In the conclusion of a two-part episode, the characters of Sandy and Bud are written out of the show (by that time, both Halpin and Norden had grown out of their roles), as it is detailed how each plans to leave Coral Key — Sandy has been accepted to the Coast Guard Academy in Connecticut, and Bud will be attending a private school to study oceanography in Boston, Massachusetts, as arranged by their Aunt Martha. At the same time, a new family (the Whitmans) moves to the area: a widowed mother (portrayed by Karen Steele) and her young son and daughter (portrayed by Stuart Getz and Chris Charney). The two new children are depicted as unfamiliar with maritime life, but they promptly befriend Flipper, and promise to be his new companions after Sandy and Bud leave. Plans were made for a fourth season, revolving around the Whitman children taking the role of Flipper's guardians/playmates and their mother becoming involved in a serious relationship with Porter. Sandy and Bud presumably would have made a cameo visit in an episode or two. All this was for naught, however, as Ivan Tors chose not to continue to make a fourth season in this new format, so NBC cancelled it.

Flipper has seen periodic syndication since its NBC cancellation. The show has aired on Family Channel, Nickelodeon, Animal Planet, Discovery Kids, in high-definition on satellite provider Voom's Family Room channel, and on digital subchannel Antenna TV. Most of the images of Flipper jumping against a skyline were not in the originally aired version, as the filming took place in an enclosed lagoon. They were filmed at the end of the series and added for syndication.

The rights to Flipper were later acquired by The Samuel Goldwyn Company, later becoming a subsidiary of Orion Pictures, which in turn would later be acquired by Metro-Goldwyn-Mayer (whose MGM Television division originally produced the series), now officially owned by Amazon under Amazon MGM Studios division. As a result, MGM owns distribution rights to the series; the series copyright is held by Orion Pictures (whose own holdings include the Goldwyn library), making it one of the few pre-1985 MGM Television programs in MGM's pre-May 1986 library that is not currently owned by Warner Bros. through Turner Entertainment Co. Thus, the physical home video rights of this series is currently distributed also by Warner Bros. Home Entertainment (since 2020, under the joint venture division, Studio Distribution Services in which after Fox and MGM Worldwide home media deal expired).

As of November 2016, Flipper airs as one of a handful of classic TV series (alongside Ivan Tors' earlier series Sea Hunt) on the primarily movie-oriented digital subchannel This TV. In 2017, Flipper and Sea Hunt began airing together on Light TV.

=== Home media ===
On August 29, 2017, Olive Films re-released the first two seasons on DVD in Region 1. They also released seasons one and two on Blu-ray. Season three was released on October 31, 2017, on DVD and Blu-ray.
