= Meg Wyllie =

American actress (1917–2002)

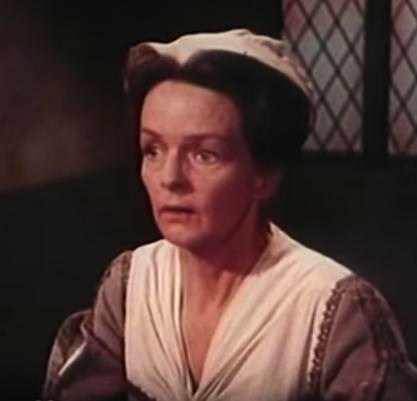
- Wyllie in 1962
- Born: Margaret Gillespie Wyllie; February 15, 1917; Honolulu, Territory of Hawaii, U.S.
- Died: January 1, 2002 (aged 84); Glendale, California, U.S.
- Other name: Meg Wylie
- Occupation: Actress
- Years active: 1952–1995

Margaret Gillespie Wyllie (February 15, 1917 – January 1, 2002), best known as Meg Wyllie, sometimes misspelled as Meg Wylie, was an American actress who appeared primarily on television. She portrayed Mrs. Kissel in The Travels of Jaimie McPheeters (1963–1964).

== Early years ==
Born in Honolulu, Territory of Hawaii, Wyllie grew up in the Philippines, where her father worked as an engineer in sugar plantations on Negros Island near Bacolod. She attended the Brent School in Baguio for grammar school and high school then moved to New York City in the 1940s.

== Stage ==
Wyllie acted with the Pasadena Playhouse, in Visit to a Small Planet (1958), Two on an Island (1940) and All the Comforts of Home (1941). She had previously appeared in Dear Brutus and Morning Glory there.

On Broadway, she performed in Norman Ginsbury's historic play The First Gentleman.

== Television ==
In 1959, she appeared on Wagon Train S3 E5 "The Elizabeth McQueeny Story". In 1960, she appeared in the "Bullets and Ballet" episode of Tightrope!, as Mrs. Blowers in Wagon Train in the episode "The Ricky & Laurie Bell Story" and in The Twilight Zone episode "The Night of the Meek". That same year, she was cast as Mrs. Shafer in the episode "The Captain's Dilemma" of the CBS military sitcom/drama series, Hennesey, starring Jackie Cooper as a United States Navy physician and Abby Dalton as nurse Martha Hale.

Between 1962 and 1966, Wyllie made four guest appearances on Perry Mason. Her most substantial role of these was as Ninevah Stone in the episode, "The Case of the Nebulous Nephew" (1963). She also played Marguerite Keith, the owner of a home in the path of a road, in the 1964 episode "The Case of the Ruinous Road".

In the 1963–64 season, Wyllie had a recurring role as Mrs. Kissel in 18 episodes of The Travels of Jaimie McPheeters, starring child actor Kurt Russell in the title role. Mark Allen played Matt Kissel, her husband, in nineteen episodes.

She played the first-ever villain in Star Trek, the Talosian "Keeper" in the pilot episode, "The Cage" (1964). Not broadcast in its original form for many years, this material was used in the two-parter, "The Menagerie" (1966).

Wyllie appeared in the Batman episode "Black Widow Strikes Again" (1967), which starred Tallulah Bankhead as the villain. She appeared on ABC's General Hospital as three different characters-Nurse Doris Roach (1974) who revealed to Lesley Faulkner that her daughter (Laura Vining) was still alive; Antique shop proprietor Hester Frumpkin (1982) who worked for Laura's kidnapper, David Gray; and a brief replacement for Anna Lee as Lila Quartermaine (1994). She also played several different characters on both The Golden Girls and Designing Women.

== Death ==
Wyllie died on January 1, 2002, at the age of 84, in Glendale, California, from heart failure. She never married.

== Filmography ==
=== Film ===
Year	Title	Role	Notes
1961	The Flight That Disappeared	Helen Cooper	
1961	The Children's Hour	Wells’ Maid	Uncredited
1962	Beauty and the Beast	Woman	
1964	Marnie	Mrs. Turpin	
1967	Fitzwilly	Saleswoman	Uncredited
1971	Vanishing Point	Police Dispatcher	Uncredited
1974	Our Time	Nurse	
1976	Lipstick	Sister Margaret	
1983	Second Thoughts	Mrs. Gardner	
1983	Cracking Up	Anti-Smoking Enforcer	Uncredited
1984	The Last Starfighter	Granny Gordon	
1986	Nothing in Common	Grandma on Commercial Set	
1987	Dragnet	Mrs. Gannon	
1989	Worth Winning	Granny	

=== Television ===
Year	Title	Role	Notes
1960	The Twilight Zone (1959 TV series)	Sister Florence	S2:E11, "The Night of the Meek"
1962	Wagon Train	Matilda	S6:E5, "The John Augustus Story"
1965	Wagon Train	Betsy's mother	S8:E22, "The Betsy Blee Smith Story"
1966	Star Trek: The Original Series	The Keeper	S1:E0, "The Cage"
1966	Star Trek: The Original Series	The Keeper	S1:E11-E12, "The Menagerie"
1967	Batman	Grandma	S2:E55, "Black Widow Strikes Again"
1974	The Bob Newhart Show	Mrs. Fleming	S3:E10, "Life is a Hamburger"
1977	The Love Boat	Sister #1	S1:E10, "Dear Beverly; Strike; Special Delivery"
1987	The Golden Girls	Candy the stewardess	S3:E5, "Nothing to Fear But Fear Itself"
1988	The Golden Girls	Edna	S3:E14, "Blanche's Little Girl"
1991	The Golden Girls	Millicent Kennedy	S7:E6, "Mother Load"
1994	Mad About You	Aunt Lolly Stemple	S3:E8, "Giblets for Murray"
1995	Mad About You	Aunt Lolly Stemple	S3:E14, "Mad About You, part 2"; S3:E16, "The Alan Brady Show"; S3:21 "Cake Fear"
