= Catalina Caper =

1967 film by Lee Sholem

- Theatrical poster
- Directed by: Lee Sholem
- Screenplay by: Clyde Ware
- Story by: Sam Pierce
- Produced by: Jack Bartlett; Bond Blackman
- Starring: Tommy Kirk; Del Moore; Peter Duryea; Robert Donner; Ulla Strömstedt; Jim Begg; Mike Blodgett; Venita Wolf; Peter Mamakos; Little Richard; Carol Connors; The Cascades
- Cinematography: Ted V. Mikels
- Edited by: Herman Freedman
- Music by: Jerry Long
- Color process: Eastmancolor
- Production company: Executive Pictures Corporation
- Distributed by: Crown International Pictures
- Release date: May 26, 1967
- Running time: 84 minutes
- Country: United States
- Language: English

Catalina Caper, also known as Never Steal Anything Wet, is a 1967 comedy musical mystery film starring Tommy Kirk. It blends the beach party format with a standard crime-caper comedy. It was shot on and around Santa Catalina Island, California.

== Plot ==
An ancient Chinese scroll is stolen from a museum in Los Angeles. The thief and teenager Don Pringle arrive on Catalina Island on the same boat. About half of the film involves swimsuit-clad adolescents dancing on yachts in various montages set to the singing of Little Richard, Carol Connors and The Cascades. When they are not dancing, Pringle and his friends investigate the scroll's theft and discover that the parents of one of the boys are responsible. They also attempt to woo a mysteriously depressed young woman, Katrina Corelli, from her vaguely threatening fiancé Angelo. After wrestling the scroll away from Angelo and his cohorts, bent on more dangerous results (in an underwater scuba-diving action scene), the boys secretly return the scroll to the museum to the relief of the repentant parents.

== Cast ==
- Tommy Kirk as Don Pringle, a friend of Charlie Moss' from college. Don is used to living in a desert environment in Phoenix and has never seen the Pacific Ocean. He develops a crush on Katrina.
- Del Moore as Arthur Duval, a businessman vacationing with his wife and son. He plans to pass a fake scroll off to Lakopolous.
- Peter Duryea as Tad Duval, Arthur and Anne's son. He suspects that his parents are on Catalina as part of a shady scheme, even though his parents deny it.
- Robert Donner as Fingers O'Toole, a pratfalling agent who tails Larry to Catalina Island, hoping to catch Arthur Duval red-handed with the stolen scroll.
- Ulla Strömstedt as Katrina Corelli, Angelo's girlfriend and a visitor to Catalina. Something about her also makes her appealing to a number of guys on the island.
- Jim Begg as Larry, the Duvals' henchman, who steals the scroll that Arthur and Anne plan to create a duplicate of.
- Sue Casey as Anne Duval, Arthur's wife. She plans to duplicate the stolen scroll.
- Venita Wolf as Tina Moss, Charlie's sister. Assigned to show Don a good time, she takes him scuba-diving, and develops a crush on Don. She grows jealous about his affections toward Katrina.
- Brian Cutler as Charlie Moss, a friend of Don's, whom he met in college. A resident of Catalina, Charlie happily takes Don to have fun. Charlie is also a popular ladies' man, and has a group of three young women fawning over him the moment he returns to the island.
- Peter Mamakos as Borman, Lakopolous' assistant. He tries to steal the scroll from Duval.
- Lyle Waggoner as Angelo, Katrina's boyfriend who is on Catalina under the employ of Borman and Lakopolous. He has a quick temper, and is willing to kill to obtain the scroll for his employer.
- Lee Deane as Lakopolous, a wealthy foreign man with a thick accent, who is known to collect rare antiquities. He comes to Catalina to retrieve the scroll from Arthur Duval.
- Mike Blodgett as Bob Draper, a member of the Catalina Island Harbor Patrol who is caught up in the scheme of the Duval's. He works with Don and Tad to hatch a plan.
- Bonnie Lomann as redheaded girl
- Britt Nilsson as brunette girl
- Donna Russell as blonde girl
- James Almanzar as Sid
- Carol Connors as herself
- Little Richard as himself
- The Cascades as themselves

== Production ==
Both Never Steal Anything Wet and Scuba Party were working titles, before Catalina Caper was chosen.

Produced by Executive Pictures Corporation, formed by Bond Blackman and Jack Barlett, it started filming in September 1965, on Catalina Island. Tommy Kirk was signed to a four-picture contract, of which this was to be the first. Kirk was announced for Scuba Party in August 1965, but he did not wind up making any of the other films.

Kirk appeared in four other films in the beach party genre: Village of the Giants (1965); two AIP features, Pajama Party (1965) and The Ghost in the Invisible Bikini (1966); and It's a Bikini World (1967). Sue Casey was seen earlier as one of the female leads in another beach party film, 1965's The Beach Girls and the Monster.

Ted V. Mikels recalls "I loved shooting that... Little Richard did whatever I suggested. I didn't direct him though. He was very pleasant to work with. He was just another performer."

=== Music ===
Catalina Caper composer Jerry Long also wrote the music for another beach party film, Wild Wild Winter. The two films are his only onscreen credits. Long also wrote two songs for the film, "Never Steal Anything Wet", heard over the opening/closing credits and performed by Mary Wells; and "Scuba Party", performed onscreen by Little Richard, who is also credited as a co-writer on the song.

The Cascades perform "There's a New World Just Opening For Me", written by Ray Davies and originally recorded by The Kinks, and Carol Connors performs "Book of Love", which was written by Connors and Roger Christian.

== Reception ==
Variety called it "pretty insubstantial of its kind." Filmink described it as "kind of like a Disney film."

== In popular culture ==
Catalina Caper was featured in episode #204 of the movie-mocking television show Mystery Science Theater 3000 (MST3K).

== Home media ==
The MST3K version of the film, which was accompanied by the uncut, unriffed version as a bonus feature, was released by Rhino Home Video as part of the Collection, Volume 1 DVD set. The set was reissued by Shout Factory with additional features (but without the uncut film) in September 2015.

== See also ==
- Daytona Beach Weekend (1965)
- The Boatniks (1970)
