= The Menagerie (Star Trek: The Original Series) =

- Star Trek: The Original Series episodes
- 1989 VHS release
- Episode nos.: Season 1 Episodes 11 and 12
- Directed by: Marc Daniels (Part I); Robert Butler (Part II)
- Written by: Gene Roddenberry
- Cinematography by: Jerry Finnerman (Part I); William E. Snyder (Part II)
- Editing by: Robert L. Swanson (Part I); Leo Shreve (Part II)
- Production code: 016
- Original air dates: November 17, 1966 (Part I); November 24, 1966 (Part II)
- Running time: 50 minutes (Part I) (runtime); 50 minutes (Part II) (runtime)

Guest appearances
- Jeffrey Hunter – Captain Christopher Pike; Malachi Throne – Commodore Jose I. Mendez; Susan Oliver – Vina; Sean Kenney – Fleet Captain Christopher Pike; Julie Parrish – Lt. Piper; Majel Barrett (billed as M. Leigh Hudec) – Number One; Peter Duryea – Lt. José Tyler; John Hoyt – Dr. Philip Boyce; Adam Roarke – C.P.O. Garrison; Hagan Beggs – Lt. Hansen; Laurel Goodwin – Yeoman J.M. Colt; Meg Wyllie – The Keeper

Episode chronology
← Previous "The Corbomite Maneuver"	Next → "The Conscience of the King"
- Star Trek: The Original Series season 1

"The Menagerie" is a two-part episode from the first season of the American science fiction television series Star Trek. It comprises the eleventh and twelfth broadcast episodes of the series. Written by series creator Gene Roddenberry, with portions directed by Marc Daniels (credited for part one) and portions directed by Robert Butler (credited for part two). It is the only two-part story in the original series. Parts I and II were broadcast by NBC on November 17, 1966, and November 24, 1966. In the episode, Spock abducts his former commanding officer, Fleet Captain Christopher Pike, locks the starship Enterprise on a course to the forbidden planet Talos IV and turns himself in for court-martial where he presents an elaborate story explaining his actions.

The complexity of Star Trek's production had steadily increased the show's production time, leading to concerns that Desilu Productions would not be able to deliver episodes to NBC in time to meet their series commitments. "The Menagerie" was created as a means to reuse footage from "The Cage" — the unaired 1965 pilot episode of Star Trek — within a frame story as the early history of the Enterprise. As such, the two-part episode only required a week of production time.

"The Menagerie" was positively received and won a Hugo Award for Best Dramatic Presentation. Multi-part episodes would become far more common in later Star Trek series.

== Plot ==
=== Part I ===
The disabled and badly disfigured Fleet Captain Christopher Pike.

In 2267, the USS Enterprise arrives at Starbase 11 in response to a subspace call First Officer Spock reported receiving from the former captain of the Enterprise, Christopher Pike, under whom Spock had served. Captain Kirk and Spock meet the starbase commander, Commodore Mendez. Mendez informs them that Pike could not have sent any message, as a recent accident has left him unable to move or communicate other than answering yes/no questions with the aid of a device operated by his brainwaves. Pike refuses to communicate with anyone except Spock. After Kirk and Mendez leave to discuss the situation, Spock reveals, over Pike's repeated "no" signals, that he intends to carry out a plan that he has made.

Meanwhile, Mendez confirms that there is no record of any message sent to the Enterprise. Mendez provides Kirk with classified information on the planet Talos IV, which was visited by the Enterprise previously under Pike's command in 2254, and is now under a strict quarantine. Spock, meanwhile, commandeers the Enterprise by means of falsified recordings of Kirk's voice, places Pike under McCoy's care, and orders the ship to depart under the computer's control. Kirk and Mendez give chase in a Starbase shuttlecraft. After several hours, upon learning from the computer that the shuttlecraft does not have enough fuel to return to the starbase, Spock has them brought aboard and then gives himself up, confessing to mutiny. The crew find they are unable to change the current course of the Enterprise, which Spock affirms is heading towards Talos IV. Mendez convenes a hearing, at which Spock requests immediate court-martial, which requires three command officers. Kirk objects that only he and Mendez are available, but Spock notes that Pike is still listed for active duty. The tribunal begins, and Spock offers as his testimony what seems to be video footage of the Enterprise's earlier visit to Talos IV in 2254. (Note: The video footage used is actually from Star Trek's first pilot, "The Cage".)

On the screen, the Enterprise arrives at Talos IV in 2254 in response to a distress call from the survey ship Columbia, lost in 2236. Pike beams down to the planet along with Spock and a landing party, where they encounter a group of survivors, including a young woman named Vina, who was born around the time of the crash of Columbia. Dr. Boyce, Pike's chief medical officer, establishes that the survivors are all in perfect health, despite the circumstances. Vina promises to show Pike the secret of their health, and leads him to a rocky outcropping. Two aliens emerge from a hidden door, stun Pike, and carry him through the door. Vina, the other survivors, and their camp suddenly disappear. Pike has been abducted by the Talosians, humanoid aliens with the power to create illusions indistinguishable from reality (reality distortion fields).

Back in 2267, the scene is interrupted by a message from Starfleet Command, which reveals that the images they have been viewing are being transmitted from Talos IV. Mendez is placed in command of the Enterprise, but Spock begs Kirk to see the rest of the transmission.

=== Part II ===
Spock's trial continues, and the transmitted scene resumes with Pike in 2254 in a cell with a transparent wall. The Talosians begin their "experiment", which consists of a number of illusory situations involving Pike and Vina. The Talosians' hope is that Pike and Vina will mate and found a race of slaves who will reclaim the war-damaged surface of the planet. Meanwhile, the Enterprise crew fails to break into the underground complex with weapons enhanced by the ship's power. A landing party attempts to beam into the complex, but only the female members arrive, in order, as the Talosian "Keeper" explains, to give Pike more choices for a mate. An attempt to blast through the cell wall with the new captives' phasers fails as the weapons are apparently non-functional.

That night, Pike is able to capture the Keeper as he attempts to confiscate the weapons. Pike intuits that the phasers still function, and that their escape attempt was thwarted by an illusion. He forces the Talosian to reveal a hole in the cell wall. The humans proceed to the surface, but learn that this was the Talosians' plan. Number One sets her phaser on overload, preferring to die rather than be enslaved, but, at the sign from the captain, deactivates the weapon when more Talosians arrive. The aliens have found that humans' "unique hatred of captivity" makes them unsuitable for the Talosians' plans, which must therefore be abandoned. Pike desires an apology, but the Talosians point out that this failure spells the death of their species. Pike offers help from the interstellar community, but the Talosians fear that their mental powers would spread and bring other races to ruin. As the rest of the party are beamed back to the ship, Pike is shown that Vina's appearance up to now has been an illusion. In reality she was severely injured in the Columbia's crash and further left deformed by the Talosians' failure to adequately repair her injuries. She elects to stay on the planet, and Pike returns to the ship.

Back in 2267, the transmission ends as the Enterprise arrives at Talos IV. Commodore Mendez suddenly fades away, and the Keeper appears on the viewing screen, informing Kirk that Mendez's presence was an illusion. The court-martial was a ploy to buy time to bring Pike back to Talos IV, where, if willing, he would be able to enjoy the illusion of a normal life. A message from Commodore Mendez then advises that Starfleet has waived the prohibition against contact with the planet for this one occasion, and that Kirk is free to proceed as he thinks best. Pike is transported to the planet, and the rejuvenated Pike and Vina are seen on the viewing screen returning with the Talosians to the underground complex. The Keeper appears one last time to wish Kirk well.

== Production ==
"The Menagerie" was a solution to a large and growing problem with the show's production: its special effects, unprecedented for a weekly television production, were causing delays in the completion of each episode. The problem was cumulative, with shows getting delivered to NBC later and later. In order to fulfill their series commitment with NBC, Roddenberry wrote a two-part episode that needed only one week of production, and would reuse a large amount of footage from the then-unaired original pilot of Star Trek, "The Cage".

New filming took place for the framing story for "The Cage". Since Jeffrey Hunter was unavailable to reprise his role as Captain Pike, a look-alike actor, Sean Kenney, played the injured captain in the new scenes, although Hunter was represented in flashback footage and credited accordingly (along with the other original "Cage" cast). Also in the new scenes, Malachi Throne (who provided the voice of the Keeper in the original "Cage") portrayed Commodore Jose Mendez, while Julie Parrish played personal assistant Miss Piper. Since Throne played a second role in "The Menagerie", the Keeper's voice was electronically processed to sound higher-pitched. This modified voice would replace Malachi Throne's original voice work in the remastered and new "Original" versions of "The Cage" released later. The Keeper, wishing Kirk a pleasant future, further addresses the captain by name as the illusory fully able-bodied Pike is seen walking with Vina. The preview trailer for Part II uses Throne's original Keeper's voice.

The framing story was directed by veteran Star Trek director Marc Daniels. Because most of his footage was used in Part I, he was given directing credit for this part. The director of "The Cage", Robert Butler, was given credit for Part II, because most of that footage was from the original pilot.

Susan Oliver actually plays the slave girl painted in green makeup and dancing for Captain Pike. During preproduction makeup tests (using Majel Barrett as a stand-in), they sent the footage out for printing and when the film returned, she did not appear very green. The film processing laboratory thought there had been an error in colorizing and thought they should compensate. The first time this happened, they reshot the film with a darker green and sent it out again for printing. The same thing happened again, but eventually the laboratory was notified to make no color changes.

Footage from the master negative of "The Cage" was edited into the master negative of "The Menagerie". No other color or 35 mm copy of "The Cage" existed, only a black and white 16 mm print owned by Gene Roddenberry. In 1987, the full-color negative "trims" from "The Cage" that had not been used in "The Menagerie" were discovered at a film laboratory in Los Angeles and returned to Paramount Pictures.

== Reception ==
"The Menagerie" is highly regarded by fans and in 1967 it won the Hugo Award for Best Dramatic Presentation, one of only two episodes in the original series to do so. Zack Handlen of The A.V. Club gave the episode a 'B−' rating, noting that "the whole thing plays out over two hours, and with a framing story from the regular cast that, while dramatic, doesn't quite gel." Handlen did note some memorable aspects of the episode such as the extent of Pike's injuries and the ambiguity around his final fate.

In 2012, Christian Science Monitor ranked this the seventh best episode of the original Star Trek.

In 2015, SyFy ranked this episode as one of the top ten essential Star Trek original series Spock episodes.

In 2016, The Hollywood Reporter rated "The Menagerie" the 32nd best episode of all Star Trek television episodes.

In 2017, Space.com ranked "The Menagerie" the third best episode of all Star Trek television. They noted how the episode surprised audiences with Spock's behavior (e.g., why did he break Federation rules?) and also how it worked footage from the pilot "The Cage" into an episode.

In 2018, PopMatters ranked this the 16th best episode of the original series. They remark that this was the only two-part episode of the original run and that it focuses on Captain Christopher Pike, a previous captain of the Enterprise with whom Spock also served.

In 2018, Collider ranked this the 20th best episode of the original television series.

In 2019, Nerdist included this episode in their "Best of Spock" binge-watching guide.

== Theatrical release ==
On November 13 and 15, 2007, the digitally remastered version of "The Menagerie", in high definition and with Cinema Surround Sound, was released in theatres as a special two-night-only showing. It included a message from Gene "Rod" Roddenberry Jr., a 20-minute "making of" documentary about the restoration process, and a trailer for season two of the remastered series. This presentation was also shown in the United Kingdom for distribution for one night only at selected Odeon Cinemas on November 13, 2007.

Some repertory movie theaters in North America showed the classic two-part episode as a feature film in the 1970s. The two original series episodes were shown back-to-back and unedited as part of one program. One such theater, the Seville in Montreal, showed 16mm prints of "The Menagerie" episodes on a big screen as part of a program that concluded with the presentation of the Star Trek blooper reels from seasons one and two.
