= Laurel Goodwin =

American actress (1942–2022)

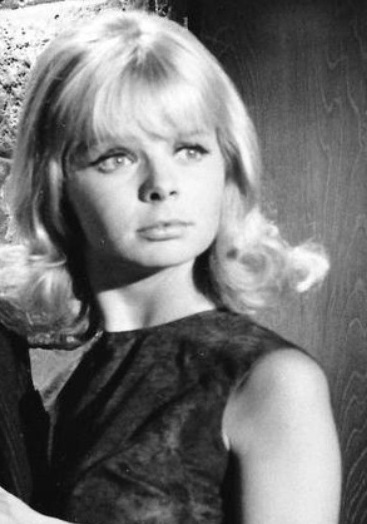
- Goodwin in Get Smart, 1966
- Born: August 11, 1942; Wichita, Kansas, U.S.
- Died: February 25, 2022 (aged 79); Cathedral City, California, U.S.
- Occupation: Actress
- Years active: 1962–1971
- Known for: Girls! Girls! Girls!; The Menagerie
- Spouse: Walter Wood (m. 1967; died 2010)

Laurel Goodwin (August 11, 1942 – February 25, 2022) was an American film and television actress who is known for her role as the love interest of Elvis Presley in the 1962 film Girls! Girls! Girls!, as well as appearing as Yeoman J.M. Colt in the rejected Star Trek pilot episode "The Cage".

== Life and career ==
Goodwin was born in Wichita, Kansas, on August 11, 1942. She later moved with her family to San Diego, and then San Francisco.

A child model, Goodwin made her screen debut as the love interest of Elvis Presley in the film, Girls! Girls! Girls! (1962).

She was a co-star in the Paramount comedy Papa's Delicate Condition (1963), playing Augusta Griffith, the daughter of Jack (Jackie Gleason) and Amberlyn Griffith. She also appeared in the western films Stage to Thunder Rock (1964), Law of the Lawless (1964) and The Glory Guys (1965).

Her work as a guest actor on several drama television series included a role as Yeoman J. M. Colt in the 1964 Star Trek pilot episode, "The Cage" (from which scenes featuring Goodwin were later incorporated into the first season two-part episode "The Menagerie"), and Mannix ("A Question Of Midnight").

She also played roles in some comedy series. These included the role of Phoebe, the Chief's niece, in the TV comedy Get Smart and the role of Stella in two episodes of The Beverly Hillbillies ("Robin Hood and the Sheriff" and "Robin Hood of Griffith Park") (both 1967).

== Personal life and death ==
She married Walter Wood in 1967. After retiring from acting in 1971, Goodwin pursued a career in home nursing for over 35 years. When Wood became ill, she began taking care of him full-time until he died about a year and a half later, in 2010.

Goodwin died in Cathedral City, California, on February 25, 2022, at the age of 79.
