= Sean Kenney (actor) =

American actor and photographer

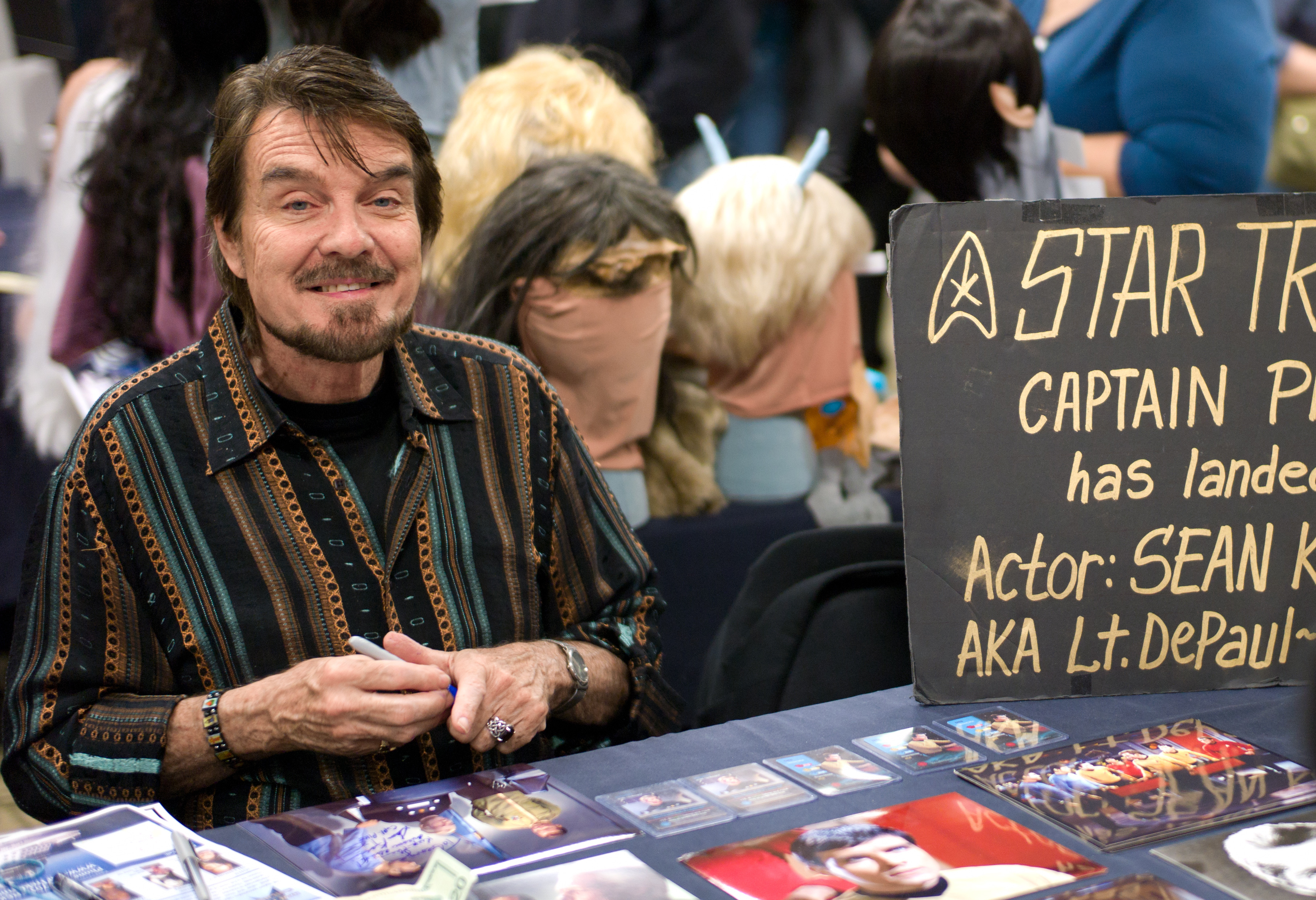
- Sean Kenney signing photos at 2011 Chicago Star Trek convention
- Born: Sean David Kenney; March 13, 1944 (age 82); Boston, Massachusetts, U.S.
- Other names: Evan Steel, Evan Steele
- Occupations: Actor, Photographer
- Years active: 1966–1976
- Website: http://www.bizphoto.com/index.html

Sean David Kenney (born March 13, 1944) is an American actor best known for his role in Star Trek as the physically disabled Fleet Captain Christopher Pike in "The Menagerie" (Pike before his disability was played by Jeffrey Hunter), and as Lieutenant DePaul in "Arena" and "A Taste of Armageddon." Kenney wrote a memoir (Captain Pike Found Alive!) that recounts this time of his life.

After his roles on Star Trek and a few other small parts, including his first bit part in The Impossible Years (1968), Kenney had leading roles in several films including How's Your Love Life? (1971), the cult horror film The Corpse Grinders (1971), and Slumber Party '57 (1976), which is his final film to date.

In 1980, Kenney became a professional photographer, mainly focusing on promotional photographic work.

== Filmography ==
- The Impossible Years (1968) (uncredited)
- Machismo: 40 Graves for 40 Guns (1971) .... Wichita
- The Toy Box (1971) .... Ralph (as Evan Steel)
- The Corpse Grinders (1971) .... Dr. Howard Glass
- How's Your Love Life? (1971) .... Steve Roberts
- Roadside Service (1973) (as Evan Steel)
- Cycle Psycho (1973).... Romeo
- Terminal Island (1973) .... Bobby
- Slumber Party '57 (1976) .... Cal

== Television ==
Year	Title	Role	Notes
1966	Star Trek: The Original Series	Fleet Captain Christopher Pike	S1:E11-E12, "The Menagerie"
1966	Star Trek: The Original Series	Lt. DePaul	S1:E18, "Arena" S1:E23, "A Taste of Armageddon"

== Bibliography ==
- Captain Pike Found Alive!, Outskirts Press, Inc., 2013.
