= Tommy Norden =

American retired actor (born 1952)

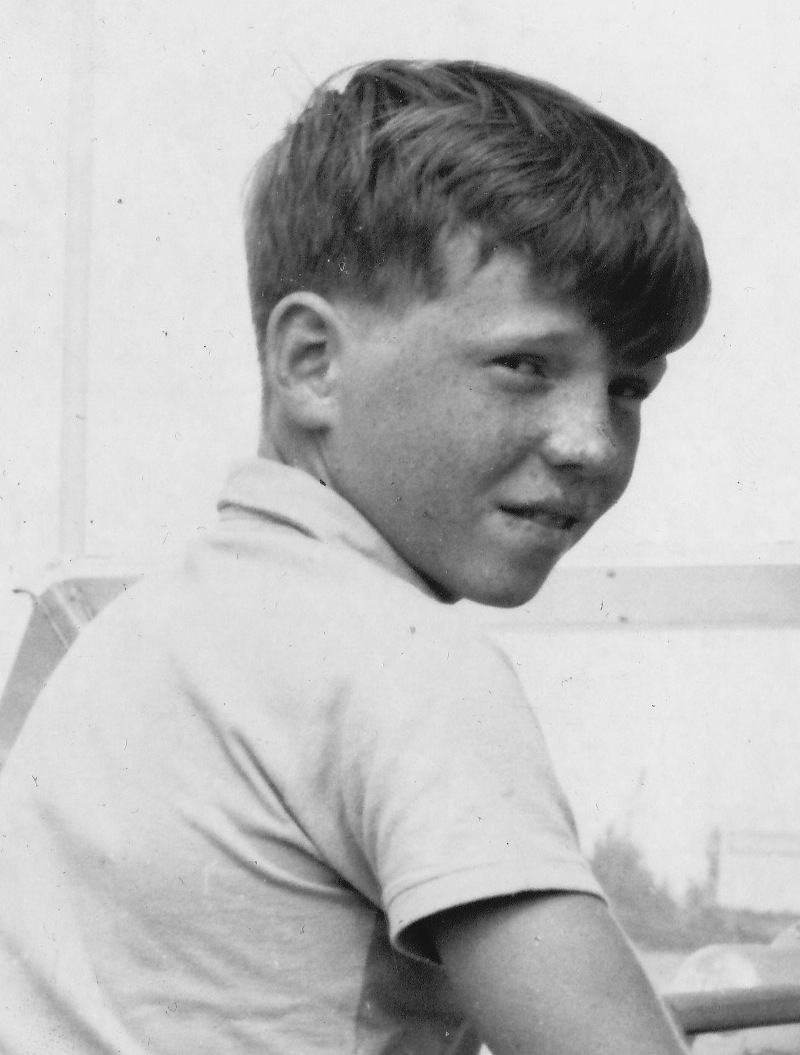
- Tommy Norden, circa 1965.
- Born: September 25, 1952 (age 72); New York City, U.S.
- Occupation: Actor
- Years active: 1960-1975

Tommy Norden (born September 25, 1952, New York City) is an American businessman and retired actor, most widely-known as Bud Ricks, the red-haired, younger brother of Sandy Ricks (Luke Halpin) on the television series Flipper.

Other performances include a minor role in the film Five Miles to Midnight (1962), as well as TV roles in episodes of Naked City (1961–62; including an episode with future Flipper co-star Luke Halpin), Route 66 (1963), East Side/West Side (1964), and The Secrets of Isis (1975). He appeared in Sing Along With Mitch (1963) as one of the Sing Along Kids. During the 1970s, he had a role on the daytime soap opera Search for Tomorrow as Dr. Gary Walton.

Prior to his film and television roles, he appeared on Broadway in the musical comedies Greenwillow (1960) and The Music Man (1960–1961).

He appeared in a 1962 Oreo commercial, "Oreos – Little Girls Have Pretty Curls", which won the Best Baked Goods & Confections Award at the 1962 American TV Commercial Awards and was exhibited at the 12th MoMA International Festival of Film Preservation in 2014. He appeared in a 1962 promotional film for New York Airways, entitled "The Skyline Route". Norden left acting to pursue the family business.

Norden who attended Power Memorial Academy in New York City (Class of 1971), presently owns an executive recruiting company in New York City, and appeared at the Miami Seaquarium's 40th and 50th anniversary celebrations of Flipper.
