= The Corpse Grinders =

1971 American comedy horror film directed by Ted V. Mikels

- Theatrical release poster
- Directed by: Ted V. Mikels
- Written by: Arch Hall; Joe Cranston
- Produced by: Ted V. Mikels
- Starring: Sean Kenney; Monika Kelly; Sanford Mitchell; J. Byron Foster
- Cinematography: Bill Anneman
- Edited by: Ted V. Mikels
- Music by: Ted V. Mikels
- Distributed by: Geneni Film Distributors
- Release date: December 27, 1971
- Running time: 72 minutes
- Country: United States
- Language: English

The Corpse Grinders is a 1971 American comedy horror film directed by Ted V. Mikels.

In the film, a cat food company uses human corpses as ingredients for their products. The result is that pet cats acquire a taste for human flesh, and start attacking humans who are still alive.

== Plot ==
When the Lotus Cat Food Company finds itself in financial trouble, the owners stumble upon a new, cheap source of meat—the local graveyard. Only one problem—the cats develop a taste for human flesh, and the pets have turned viciously against their owners all over town. Veterinary doctor Howard Glass (Sean Kenney) and his nurse Angie Robinson (Monika Kelly) become suspicious and begin to investigate.

"It’s a silly little gore comedy that stars Sanford Mitchell and J. Byron Foster as the owners of a cat food firm who find their sales booming when they accidentally turn a sleeping partner into cat food."

== Cast ==
- Sean Kenney as Dr. Howard Glass
- Monika Kelly as Angie Robinson
- Sanford Mitchell as Landau
- J. Byron Foster as Maltby
- Warren Ball as Caleb
- Ann Noble as Cleo
- Vince Barbi as Monk
- Harry Lovejoy as The Neighbor
- Earl Burnam as Mr. De Sisto
- Zena Foster as Mrs. Babcock
- Ray Dannis as Mr. Babcock
- Drucilla Hoy as Tessie
- Charles Fox as Willie (as Charles 'Foxy' Fox)

== Production ==
The film was based on a script by Arch Hall who Mikels called "such a nice, nice man. This was the only time in my life where somebody brought in a full script. It wasn’t called THE CORPSE GRINDERS. I started to read it and I was enthralled and right while Arch was sitting there, I said ‘How much do you want for this?’ And he told me. I said, ‘Let’s go across the street to my bank.’ I liked the whole concept, but of course, it changed a great deal. I bought the property right then and there.”

"The Corpse Grinders is the giddy centerpiece of a four year homemade-horror phase in the life of Mikels. It’s also a defining moment in off-the-cuff, vintage drive-in comfort."

== Reception ==
Mikels said later "it made its own name all over the world. No matter where I go, people talk about CORPSE GRINDERS. Boomers, if you want to call them that, said they saw that when they were kids and have never forgotten it, it’s the most memorable picture they ever saw. It set box office records, when the tickets were 25 and 50 cents, that, even to this day, surpassed even the big pictures today. It made a lot of money. It’s the only picture where I made some money."

In its review of the film, Variety wrote that it "carries enough blood to satisfy any cravings for this type of divertissement, but it's a cheapie in every respect." Conversely, Eric Henderson of Slant Magazine stated: "Make no mistake, there is nothing in Ted V. Mikels' infamous grindhouse cheapie The Corpse Grinders even a fraction as disturbing as the graphic art of its promotional one-sheet."
