= Del Moore =

American actor, comedian and radio announcer (1916–1970)

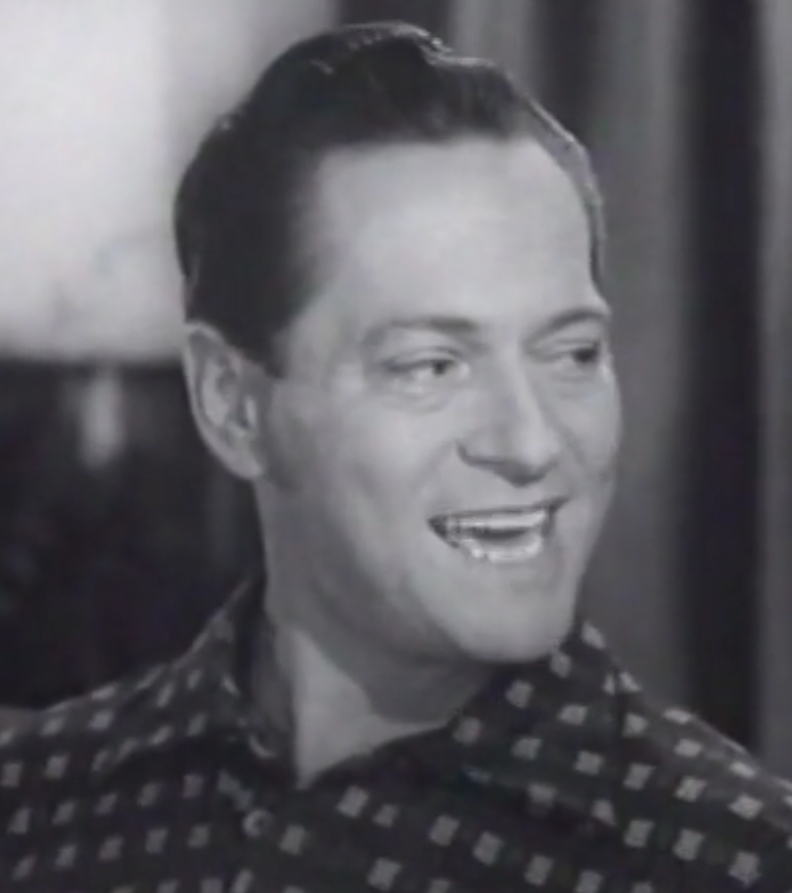
- Del Moore in Life with Elizabeth (1953)
- Born: Marion Delbridge Moore; May 14, 1916; Pensacola, Florida, U.S.
- Died: August 30, 1970 (aged 54); Encino, California, U.S.
- Occupations: Actor; comedian; radio announcer
- Years active: 1952–1970
- Spouses: Jessie Newbold (m. 1937; div. 1943) Gayle Ferber (m. 1945)

Marion Delbridge "Del" Moore (May 14, 1916 – August 30, 1970) was an American actor, comedian and radio announcer.

== Life and career ==
Moore was born on May 14, 1916, in Pensacola, Florida, he began his career in radio before moving to television. After serving in the US Army Air Forces in World War II, Moore appeared in 1952 in the first of several So You Want To ... Warner Bros. comedy shorts with George O'Hanlon. He co-starred in the early television comedy Life with Elizabeth (1953–55), with Betty White; he also was doing a morning radio spot at KMPC radio. He appeared in many episodes of Dragnet and Adam-12, and was a regular on the series Bachelor Father playing Cal Mitchell. For several years in the late 1950s he hosted a daily children's program opposite Willy the Wolf (a muppet-like adult size character), as well as hosting the Late Late Show on KTTV Channel 11 in Los Angeles.

Moore played supporting roles in several Jerry Lewis films, including The Big Mouth and The Patsy. He made his feature film debut in Lewis' Cinderfella in 1960 and was the university president in 1963's The Nutty Professor. He was also in the 1967 teen film Catalina Caper, which later appeared as an "experiment" in a 1990 episode of Mystery Science Theater 3000.

For his work on television, Del Moore received a star on the Hollywood Walk of Fame on February 8, 1960.

Moore was married twice. He first married Jessie Newbold in 1937 in Florida. After their divorce, he remarried to Gayle Pearl Ferber in 1945 in California.

== Death ==
Moore died of a cerebral hemorrhage in Encino, California, in 1970 at the age of 54. He is buried at Forest Lawn Memorial Park in Glendale, California.

== Filmography ==
Year	Title	Role	Notes
1956	Bus Stop	Man at Rodeo	Uncredited
1956	Hollywood or Bust	Photographer	Uncredited
1960	The Bellboy	Golf Announcer	Voice, Uncredited
1960	Cinderfella	Radio Announcer	Uncredited
1961	Dondi	Police Detective	Uncredited
1961	The Last Time I Saw Archie	Pvt. Frank Ostrow	
1961	The Ladies Man	TV Announcer	Uncredited
1961	The Errand Boy	M.C. at Premiere	
1962	Stagecoach to Dancers' Rock	Hiram Best	
1962	It's Only Money	Patrolman	
1963	The Nutty Professor	Dr. Mortimer S. Warfield	
1963	Who's Minding the Store?	Department Store Announcer	Voice, Uncredited
1964	The Patsy	Policeman	
1964	The Disorderly Orderly	Dr. Davenport	
1965	Two on a Guillotine	Reporter Joe Russell	Uncredited
1966	Three on a Couch	Announcer	Uncredited
1966	Movie Star, American Style or; LSD, I Hate You	Dr. Horatio	
1967	Catalina Caper	Arthur Duval	
1967	The Big Mouth	Mr. Hodges	
1969	Hook, Line & Sinker	Television Clergyman / Gravedigger at Funeral	Uncredited
