= Peter Duryea =

American actor

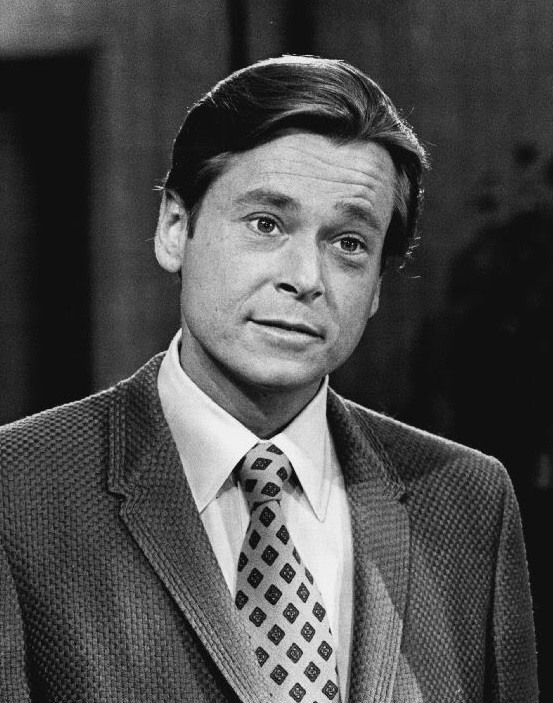
- Peter Duryea in 1971
- Born: July 14, 1939; Los Angeles, California, U.S.
- Died: March 24, 2013 (aged 73); Kootenay Lake, British Columbia, Canada
- Occupation: Actor
- Years active: 1963–1976
- Parent(s): Dan Duryea, Helen Bryan

Peter Duryea (July 14, 1939 – March 24, 2013) was an American actor. He is best known for appearing in a pilot episode of Star Trek: The Original Series, "The Cage" (1964), of which most of his scenes were reused in "The Menagerie" (1966). His father, Dan Duryea, was also an actor.

== Early life and career ==
Duryea was born in Los Angeles in 1939. He studied math and physics at Amherst College in Massachusetts before discovering acting.

Duryea played Lieutenant Jose Tyler in the original Star Trek pilot episode, "The Cage." He also appeared in The Fugitive, The Outer Limits, Dr. Kildare, Daniel Boone, Bewitched, Dragnet 1967, Adam-12, I Spy and Family Affair.

== Tipi Camp ==
Duryea was the head of a non-profit society called Guiding Hands Recreation Society which hosted a peaceful getaway called the Tipi Camp. Located in the West Kootenay area of British Columbia, Canada, the camp opened in 1988. Groups and individuals book time at the Tipi Camp to reflect in a gentle collection of tipis along an idyllic lake. The camp sees about 300 visitors annually.

People travel from all over North America to participate in many of the different programs available at the Tipi Camp. Some of the more popular programs are the "W.I.S.E Camp" (Wilderness Immersion for Self-Esteem) and the annual Yoga Retreats. The "W.I.S.E Camp" is intended for teenagers and emphasizes self-respect, respect for others and respect for the environment. The closest town is Nelson.

== Personal life and death ==
Duryea moved to Kootenay Lake in British Columbia in the 1970s. He and his longtime partner, Janice Bryan, had a daughter named Star.

Duryea died at his home on March 24, 2013, aged 73, from undisclosed causes.

== Filmography ==
- The Defenders (1964, TV Series)
  - episode: Survival .... Collier
- The Carpetbaggers (1964) .... Assistant director (uncredited)
- The Outer Limits (1964, TV Series)
  - episode: Expanding Human .... Morrow
- Kraft Suspense Theatre (1964, TV Series)
  - episode: A Lion Amongst Men .... Victor Palchek
- Taggart (1964) .... Rusty Bob Blazer
- Dr. Kildare (1965, TV Series)
  - episode: Lullaby for an Indian Summer .... Larry
- Daniel Boone (1965, TV Series)
  - episode: The Sound of Fear .... Andrew Perigore (appeared with his father Dan Duryea)
- The Bounty Killer (1965) .... Youth
- Bewitched (1965, TV Series)
  - episode: The Magic Cabin .... Charles McBain
- Lt. Robin Crusoe, U.S.N. (1966) .... Co-pilot
- The Virginian (1966, TV Series)
  - episode: Jacob Was a Plain Man .... Nicky
- Bob Hope Presents the Chrysler Theatre (1965-1966, TV Series)
  - episode: Massacre at Fort Phil Kearney .... First Soldier
  - episode: A Time for Killing .... Jimmy
- Twelve O'Clock High (1964-1966, TV Series)
  - episode: The Pariah .... Staff Sgt. Hunter
  - episode: Decision .... Lt. Peters
- Combat! (1965-1967, TV Series)
  - episode: Jonah .... Simmons
  - episode: The Linesman .... Pvt. O'Connor
- Star Trek: The Original Series (1966, TV Series)
  - episode: The Cage .... Lieutenant Jose Tyler (final appearance)
  - S1:E11-E12, "The Menagerie" as Lt. José Tyler
- Catalina Caper (1967) .... Tad Duval
- I Spy (1968, TV Series)
  - episode: Tag, You're It .... Halsey
- Gomer Pyle, U.S.M.C. (1968, TV Series)
  - episode: Gomer, the Perfect M.P. .... Ben Derzansky
- The Name of the Game (1969, TV Series)
  - episode: Swinger's Only .... Photographer
- Adam-12 (1969, TV Series)
  - episode: Log 62: Grand Theft Horse? .... Charles Carter
- Dragnet 1967 (1967-1969, TV Series)
  - episode: Intelligence - DR-34 ....s Paul Reed
  - episode: Internal Affairs - DR-20.... John Meadows
  - episode: The Trial Board .... Ted Clover
- Blood of the Iron Maiden (1970) .... Peter
- Family Affair (1971, TV Series)
  - episode: Cinder-Emily .... Jim Turner
  - episode: Too Late, Too Soon .... Jim Turner
- Insight (1972-1976, TV Series)
  - episode: Ride a Turquoise Pony (1972).... Bruce
  - episode: Reunited (1976).... Bruce
