= Ulla Strömstedt =

Swedish actress (1939–1986)

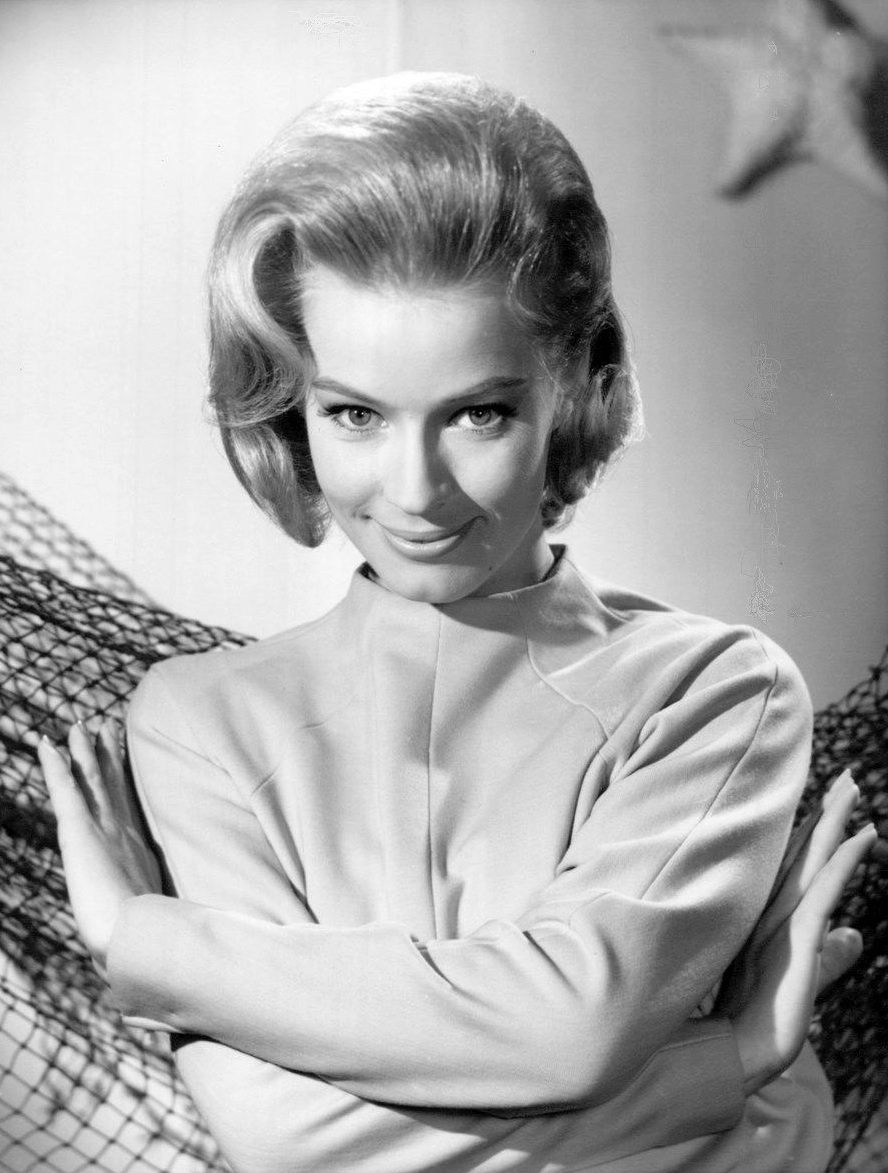
- Strömstedt in 1966
- Born: 27 November 1939; Stockholm, Sweden
- Died: 13 June 1986 (aged 46); Cannes, France
- Education: Sorbonne; Actors Studio
- Occupation: Actress
- Years active: 1961–1985
- Known for: Catalina Caper; Flipper
- Spouse: Gilbert Cole (m. 1961–1986)
- Children: 1

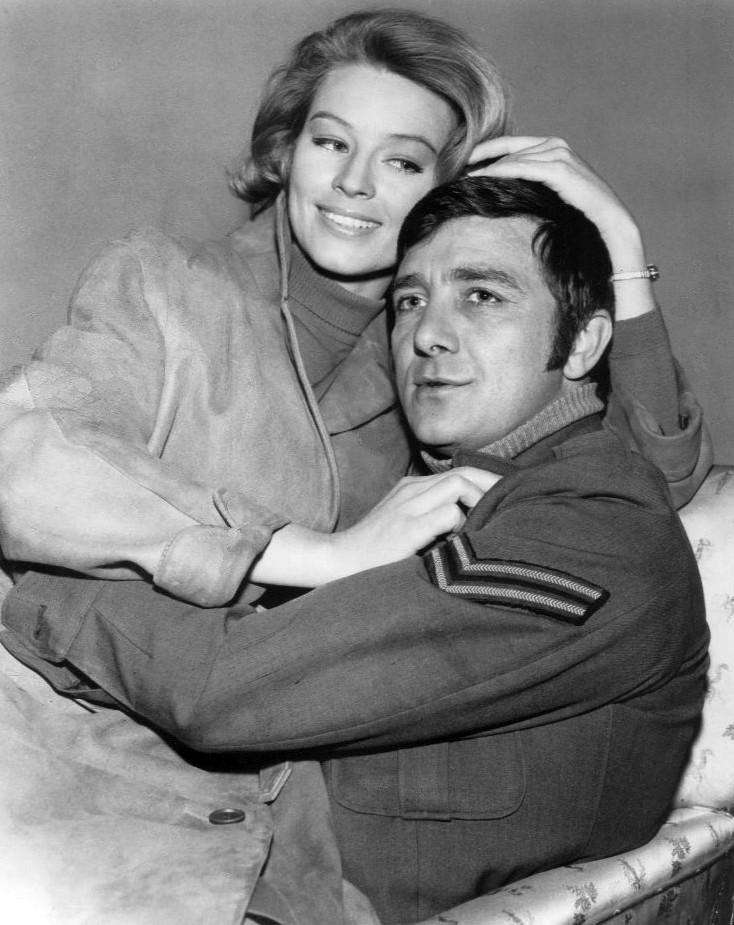
With Richard Dawson, from Hogan's Heroes

Ulla Strömstedt (Swedish pronunciation: [ˈɵ̂lːa ˈstrœ̂mstɛt]; 27 November 1939 – 13 June 1986) was a Swedish actress who appeared in several films and television shows, and known for Catalina Caper and Flipper.

== Career ==
Strömstedt's most memorable acting credits include her role in the TV series, Flipper (1965–66), and in the 1967 film, Catalina Caper. She also appeared in episodes of numerous 1960s TV shows, including Hogan's Heroes (1966–68) and Tarzan (1967).

Strömstedt studied post-baccalaureate in Stockholm, language and art at the Sorbonne in Paris, and theater studies in the United States at the Actors Studio.

== Personal life ==
In 1960, she was elected to the first Mälardrottningen in Stockholm. In 1961, she married Gilbert Cole in Los Angeles. She had one son, Jonathan Strömstedt Cole.

In 1986, Strömstedt died in Cannes, France. The official cause of death was a heart attack.

== Partial filmography ==
- The Tab Hunter Show – "Marie" in episode "Dream Boy" (episode 1.29) 9 April 1961
- Den Gula Bilen [in English: The Yellow Car] (1963) – Kerstin Björk
- Do Not Disturb (1965) – minor role (uncredited)
- Flipper (1965–1966) – 12 episodes as "Ulla Norstrand"
- I Spy – "Tilde" in episode "Rome... Take Away Three" (episode 2.16) 28 December 1966
- The Rat Patrol – "Ilse Greuner" in episode "Mask-a Raid" (episode 1.30) 10 April 1967
- Mister Terrific – "Tanya" in episode "Try This on for Spies" (episode 1.5) 24 April 1967
- Tarzan (1967) – Mary Singleton in episode "The Blue Stone of Heaven: Part 1" (episode 2.4) 6 October 1967 and in episode "The Blue Stone of Heaven: Part 2" (episode # 2.5) 13 October 1967
- Catalina Caper (1967) – Katrina Corelli
- Hogan's Heroes – "Myra" in episode "Diamond in the Rough" (episode 2.3) 30 September 1966; "Gretel" in episode "Sticky Wicket Newkirk" (episode 3.20) 20 January 1968
- Achtung Zoll! – "Actress" in episode "Apoll" (episode 2.21) 1 June 1981
- 50 Greatest TV Animals (2003) (TV) – Ulla Norstrand from Flipper (uncredited)
