= List of Maverick episodes =

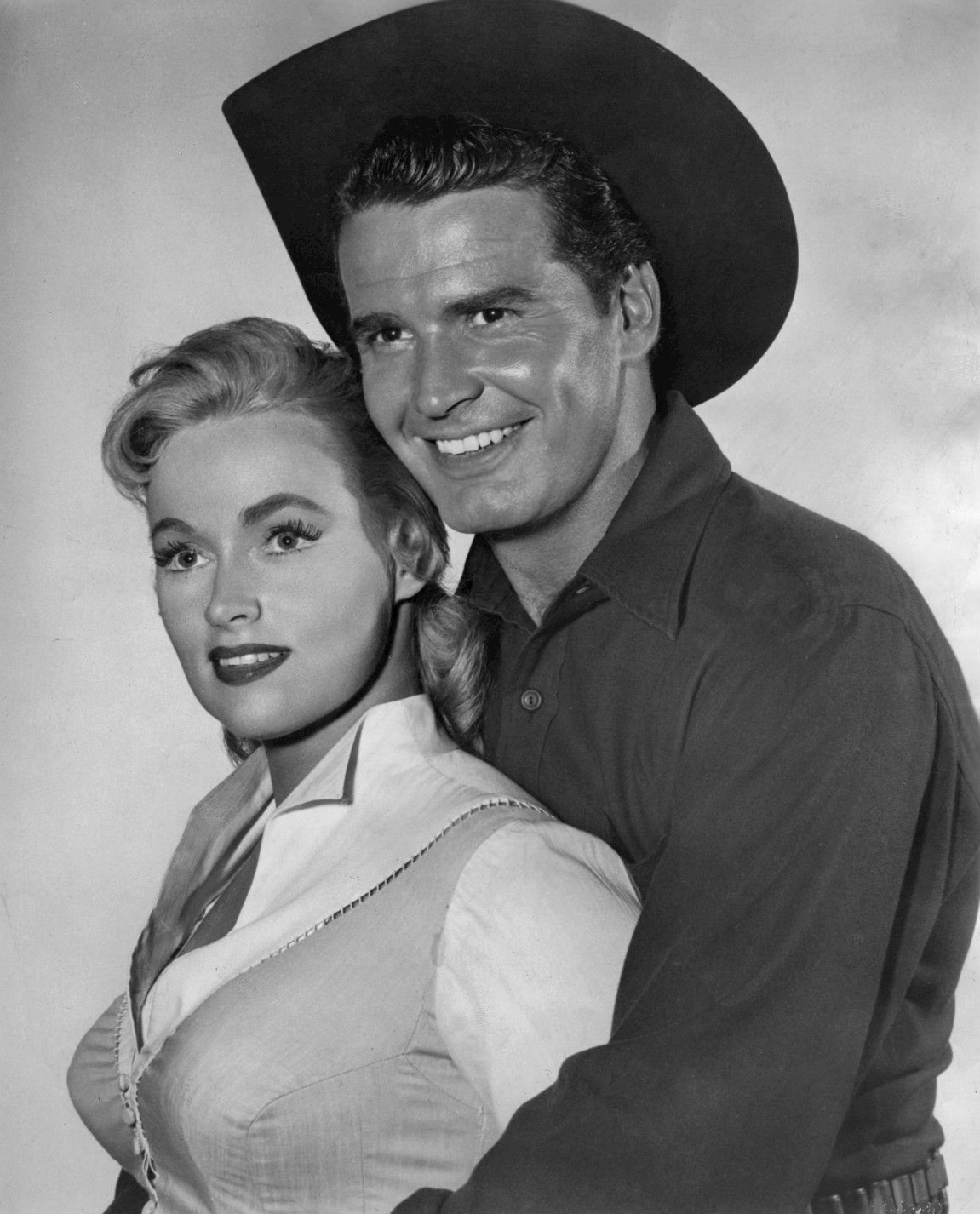
Karen Steele and James Garner

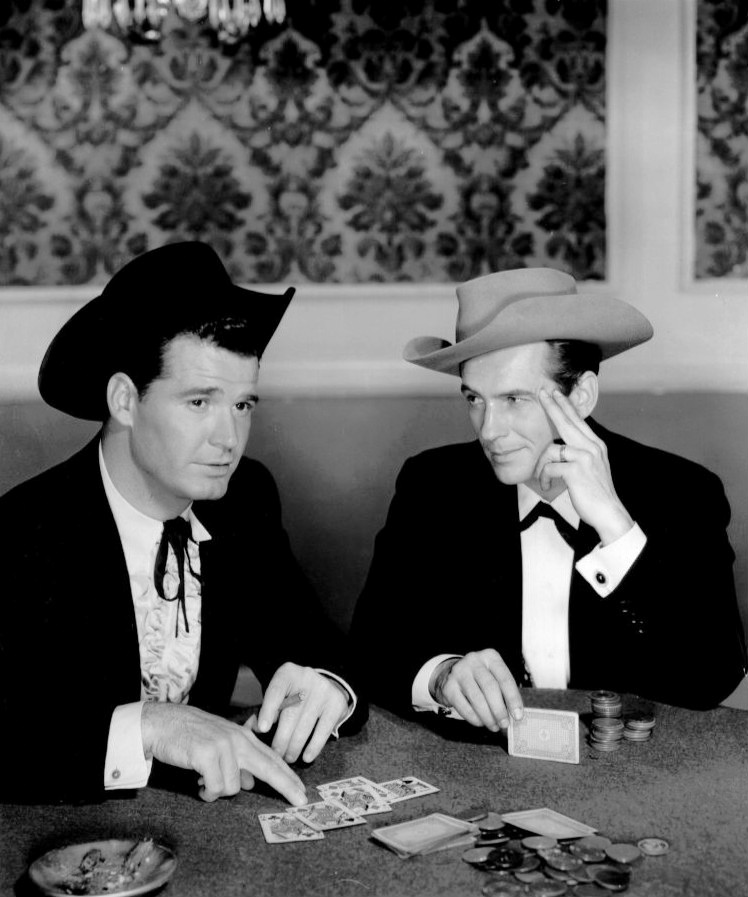
James Garner as Bret Maverick and Jack Kelly as Bart Maverick

The following is an episode list for ABC's 1957 comedic Western television series Maverick, created by Roy Huggins and starring James Garner, Jack Kelly, Roger Moore, and Robert Colbert as Bret, Bart, Beau, and Brent Maverick respectively. Unusually for an American television program, Maverick's main cast varied episodically between Garner, Kelly, Moore or Colbert. As such, the starring cast for each episode is listed below alongside other details. Most episodes feature only one of the lead characters named Maverick, and never more than two—-and in two-Maverick episodes, one of the Mavericks is always Bart, who appears in all five seasons from 1957 to 1962. James Garner stars as Bret Maverick in the first three seasons, and Roger Moore and Robert Colbert portray Beau and Brent Maverick in the fourth season.

== Cast ==
Bret Maverick: James Garner (1957-1960)
Bart Maverick: Jack Kelly (1957-1962)
Beau Maverick: Roger Moore (1960-1961)
Brent Maverick: Robert Colbert (1961)

== Series overview ==
Season	Episodes	Originally released	
Season	Episodes	First released	Last released
1	27	September 22, 1957	April 13, 1958
2	26	September 21, 1958	March 29, 1959
3	26	September 13, 1959	March 13, 1960
4	32	September 18, 1960	April 23, 1961
5	13	September 17, 1961	April 22, 1962

== Episodes ==
=== Season 1 (1957–1958) ===
James Garner as Bret Maverick is the sole star for the first seven episodes. With episode eight, he's joined by Jack Kelly as his brother Bart Maverick, brought in because it took a week and a day to make each episode, in which case the series would run out of episodes before the end of the season. The solution was to have two crews working simultaneously. From that point on, Garner and Kelly alternate leads more or less from week to week, occasionally appearing together in the same episode. Recurring characters include rival gamblers/operators Samantha Crawford (Diane Brewster), Dandy Jim Buckley (Efrem Zimbalist Jr.) and Big Mike McComb (Leo Gordon). The entire first season was released by Warner Bros. on DVD in mid-2012.

No. overall	No. in series	Title	Featured character(s)	Original release date
1	1	"War of the Silver Kings"	Bret, Big Mike	September 22, 1957
With legendary 1920s and '30s leading man Edmund Lowe. According to Roy Huggins' Archive of American Television interview, a Warners-owned property called "War of the Copper Kings" was credited by the studio as the basis for this episode's script in order to cheat Huggins out of the series creator residuals. The episode also features recurring character Big Mike McComb (Leo Gordon). At the episode's conclusion, he seems intended to be Maverick's continuing sidekick—but that was never actually the case. Garner maintained in his Archive of American Television interview that he and Gordon punched each other for real in their fight sequence. Directed by Budd Boetticher.
2	2	"Point Blank"	Bret	September 29, 1957
With Karen Steele. Roy Huggins wrote this episode as the pilot but Warner Brothers insisted on first airing an episode based on a property they previously owned. Huggins noted in his Archive of American Television interview that this was done to deny him the residuals for creating the series, a typical gambit for the studio at that time. Huggins wasn't given credit as series creator by the studio until the movie version with Mel Gibson, Jodie Foster, and Garner almost forty years later. Mike Connors plays a different character in this episode than his subsequent role in "The Naked Gallows", Richard Garland portrays the sheriff, and Peter Brown briefly appears as a deputy, foreshadowing his subsequent role in Lawman. Directed by Budd Boetticher.
3	3	"According to Hoyle"	Bret, Samantha, Big Mike	October 6, 1957
Maverick debut of Diane Brewster as Samantha Crawford, in a high-stakes riverboat poker contest with Maverick. Brewster had also played Samantha Crawford, with identical traits, the previous year in an episode of Cheyenne called "Dark Rider", and writer/producer Roy Huggins had given the character his mother's maiden name. The supporting cast includes Leo Gordon in his recurring role as Big Mike McComb, Tol Avery, Jay Novello, and Robert Carson. Gambling expert Mark Pilarski states that contrary to the on-screen claim at the start of the episode, "... the 1876 edition of 'Hoyle's Games' does not include that passage. Moreover, there is no reference in the book to stud poker, let alone five-card stud. There's also nothing about establishing table rules at the beginning of a game and nothing about straights." "According to Hoyle" was written by Russell S. Hughes from a story by Horace McCoy, and directed by Budd Boetticher in his final turn at directing the series.
4	4	"Ghost Rider"	Bret	October 13, 1957
With Stacy Keach Sr., Joanna Barnes, Rhodes Reason, Willard Sage, Dan Sheridan, John Cliff and Edd Byrnes (as a malicious young robber). Maverick offers a strange beauty a ride home in a buckboard then later learns that she had died nine days before he met her. Billed as "Stacy Keach," Stacy Keach's similar looking father portrays the sheriff. Written by Marion Hargrove and directed by Leslie H. Martinson.
5	5	"The Long Hunt"	Bret	October 20, 1957
In the aftermath of a failed stagecoach robbery, a gunshot criminal tells Maverick with his dying breaths that an innocent man remains in prison for a crime that he didn't commit, leaving the gambler with the responsibility of straightening it out. Maverick finds himself forced to intermittently become an amateur detective over a period of months. Written by DeVallon Scott and directed by Douglas Heyes.
6	6	"Stage West"	Bret	October 27, 1957
Based on a tensely dramatic Louis L'Amour story. With Erin O'Brien, Edd Byrnes, Michael Dante, Chubby Johnson. O'Brien's name is listed at the beginning of the episode after Garner's, an honor only accorded a handful of actors during the series, usually Warner Bros. contract players (Efrem Zimbalist, Jr., Peggy King, Adam West, Troy Donahue, Andrew Duggan, Roger Moore in "The Rivals," etc.). Ray Teal, later the sincere sheriff on Bonanza, performs one of his several Maverick turns as a vicious villain. Directed by Leslie H. Martinson.
7	7	"Relic of Fort Tejon"	Bret	November 3, 1957
Features Maverick and an affectionate camel left over from the United States Camel Corps. The gambler quickly realizes that a saloon's poker game is rigged and finds himself facing down a professional killer. Tyler MacDuff appears as Drake. Test footage of Jack Kelly in costume as Maverick's brother Bart interacting with Garner as Maverick was shot during a break in the filming of this episode. Kelly was chosen for the role over competition including Stuart Whitman (who resembled Garner amazingly closely at the time, apparently too much) and Rod Taylor, and Kelly appears in the following week's episode. "Relic of Fort Tejon" was directed by Leslie H. Martinson.
8	8	"Hostage"	Bret, Bart	November 10, 1957
Bart's first appearance occurs in this two-brother episode, the eighth in the series. Bret has summoned his brother Bart Maverick to New Orleans help him in a money-making venture: crashing a private riverboat cruise where extremely high-stakes gambling will be taking place. But when a prominent man's daughter is kidnapped, the plan goes awry and the Maverick brothers are prime suspects in the kidnapping case. Don Durant portrays Jody Collins, the serenading suitor from the swamps of Louisiana. For his first several shows, Jack Kelly as Bart usually wore a grey suit similar in color to his hat for greater contrast with Garner's standard black suit, right through the first season, but eventually switched to mainly a black suit while keeping the lighter colored hat, which remained his main costume through most of the run of the series. Huggins cast Kelly in the role; other actors considered included Stuart Whitman and Michael Dante, who both closely resembled Garner in physiognomy at the time to the point that it might have led to audience confusion, as well as Rod Taylor and Richard Jaeckel. Written by Gerald Drayson Adams and directed by Richard L. Bare.
9	9	"Stampede"	Bret, Dandy Jim	November 17, 1957
Efrem Zimbalist, Jr. portrays Dandy Jim Buckley in the first of five appearances. One of many episodes that begin on a riverboat. Chris Alcaide appears as Tony Cadiz and professional wrestler Mike Lane portrays "gentle giant" Noah Perkins in this epic adventure. The second half was remade over a decade later as "Fight of the Century" for Garner's subsequent Western television series Nichols. "Stampede" also features Pamela Duncan as Coral Stacey and Joan Shawlee as the flamboyantly exuberant Madame Pompey. Written by Gerald Drayson Adams and directed by Abner Biberman.
10	10	"The Jeweled Gun"	Bart, Bret	November 24, 1957
The first of Kathleen Crowley's eight different appearances in several roles, a series record by a wide margin for leading ladies. Bret appears in this episode only briefly, receiving under two minutes of screen time. Some of the plot was later cannibalized for a Garner episode entitled "A Rage for Vengeance". The early part of "The Jeweled Gun" occurs in a Spanish-influenced town. Huggins noted in his Archive of American Television interview that Garner was originally slated to play Kelly's role in this episode but the leads were switched at the last minute due to a scheduling conflict. Although Bart makes brief appearances in several Bret episodes, this is the only time Bret does so in a Bart episode. This is essentially Kelly's first solo episode. Dean Fredericks appears as Mitchell. Written by Roy Huggins and directed by Leslie H. Martinson.
11	11	"The Wrecker"	Bart, Bret	December 1, 1957
Based on a Robert Louis Stevenson ocean adventure of the same name written in 1892. This is the only episode with substantial time accorded to both brothers in which Kelly's role is larger than Garner's. According to Roy Huggins' Archive of American Television interview, the two-brother scripts designated the brothers as "Maverick 1" and "Maverick 2", with Garner choosing which role he wanted to play due to his seniority in the series. With Errol Flynn look-alike Patric Knowles and Karl Swenson. See separate article for additional information. Teleplay by Russell S. Hughes based on the novel by Robert Louis Stevenson and Lloyd Osbourne, and directed by Franklin Adreon.
12	12	"The Quick and the Dead"	Bret	December 8, 1957
With Gerald Mohr as Doc Holliday and film noir queen Marie Windsor as a saloon owner in this tense drama about an angry gunslinger. Written and directed by Douglas Heyes.
13	13	"The Naked Gallows"	Bart	December 15, 1957
With Fay Spain as a dazzling widow, Mike Connors as a mustachioed sheriff, Morris Ankrum as a crazed zealot, Sherry Jackson as an underage temptress, Bing Russell as a violently threatening stranger and Jeanne Cooper as an attractive saloon owner. The story concerns Bart's curiosity about a year-old murder, which ushers in a world of trouble. As was the custom for Kelly's early episodes at this stage of the series, an unbilled Garner as Bret appears at the opening, addressing the camera directly to introduce the story for that week's viewers. Written by Howard Browne and directed by Abner Biberman.
14	14	"The Comstock Conspiracy"	Bret	December 29, 1957
With Ruta Lee and Werner Klemperer. Convoluted mysteries keep compounding, leaving a flummoxed Bret to wonder why this is happening. Written by Gene Levitt and directed by Howard W. Koch.
15	15	"The Third Rider"	Bart	January 5, 1958
With 1930s Western star Dick Foran as a lawman thwarted by Bart in this action-packed dramatic episode featuring Barbara Nichols and Michael Dante (who'd been among many actors tested for the role of Bart Maverick before the studio hired Jack Kelly instead). James Garner, dressed as Bret, makes a 15-second appearance to address the camera directly and introduce the episode, but receives no billing. Written by George F. Slavin and directed by Franklin Adreon.
16	16	"Rage for Vengeance"	Bret	January 12, 1958
With Catherine McLeod, Russ Conway as a sheriff, and a villainous John Russell. Frequently featured character actor Gage Clarke also appears. The only episode in the series in which Bret openly falls in love (with McLeod in her only series appearance) and wants to actually get married. Teleplay by Marion Hargrove from a story by Roy Huggins and directed by Leslie H. Martinson.
17	17	"Rope of Cards"	Bret	January 19, 1958
Bret is reluctantly dragooned into being a juror in a small-town murder case. This courtroom drama features Will Wright as an elderly attorney, Tol Avery as a murderously jealous villain, Joan Marshall as the town schoolteacher, William Reynolds as a man accused of murder, Frank Cady as an even-handed shopkeeper, and Emile Meyer as a truculently stubborn juror. Bret is offscreen, or seen only as a silent juror, for long stretches of time—at one point, nearly 20 minutes of screen time pass without a line for Bret. However, Bret demonstrates a memorable card trick ('maverick solitaire', http://www.solitairelaboratory.com/maverick.html) in the jury room, and according to Roy Huggins in his Archive of American Television interview, every deck of cards in the United States sold out the day after this episode was first broadcast. Teleplay by R. Wright Campbell from a story by Robert Ormond Case and directed by Richard L. Bare.
18	18	"Diamond in the Rough"	Bart	January 26, 1958
Bart gets assaulted and shanghaied. The San Francisco diamond swindle depicted in this episode was loosely based on the true story of the Great Diamond Hoax of 1872. With Jacqueline Beer, Fredd Wayne, Lilli Valenty, and Sig Ruman. An uncredited Don Megowan portrays the tall suitor in a memorable cameo at the conclusion of the episode. Bart mentions his old friend Dandy Jim Buckley—who at this point had yet to appear in a Bart episode. As with other early Bart-only episodes, James Garner, dressed as Bret, makes a 15-second appearance to address the camera directly and introduce the episode, but receives no billing. Directed by Douglas Heyes and written by Marion Hargrove from a story by Roy Huggins.
19	19	"Day of Reckoning"	Bret	February 2, 1958
A cowboy accuses Bret of cheating during a poker game and a blow to the head from the marshal accidentally executes the complainant in this complex dramatic episode. With Jean Willes as Lil, Virginia Gregg as Amy Hardie, Mort Mills as Red Scanlon, Tod Griffin as Jack Wade and Russell Thorsen (billed as "Russ Thorsen") as the stalwart marshal Walt Hardie. Written by Carey Wilber and directed by Leslie H. Martinson.
20	20	"The Savage Hills"	Bart, Samantha	February 9, 1958
Bart takes a turn with Samantha Crawford (Diane Brewster) on a riverboat adventure. An unbilled James Garner, dressed as Bret, introduces the episode. Written by Gerald Drayson Adams and directed by Douglas Heyes.
21	21	"Trail West to Fury"	Bret, Bart, Dandy Jim	February 16, 1958
A flashback episode about the Maverick brothers returning from the American Civil War, as told to Dandy Jim Buckley (Efrem Zimbalist, Jr.) while the three of them are trapped in a house during a flood. The plotline involves Bret and Bart having to avoid Texas after being falsely accused of a murder there, with only a mysteriously disappeared "tall man" as a witness who could exonerate them if only they could locate him. Writer/producer Roy Huggins would recycle this plot as the basis for his later television series The Fugitive, with Diane Brewster in a recurring cameo role as Richard Kimble's murdered wife. The supporting cast features frequent Maverick villain Charles Fredericks and leading lady Aline Towne. The teleplay for "Trail West to Fury" was written by Gene Levitt from a story by Joseph Chadwick, and the episode was directed by Alan Crosland Jr.
22	22	"The Burning Sky"	Bart	February 23, 1958
With a Mexican Gerald Mohr, Joanna Barnes, and Whitney Blake. An unbilled James Garner, dressed as Bret, introduces the episode, in which Bart is one of a group of six ambushed stagecoach passengers. While the group of six strangers are under siege, it becomes clear the ambushers have targeted this specific stagecoach because one of the six passengers must be secretly carrying something valuable—but who, and where could it be hidden? Teleplay by Russell S. Hughes from a story by Howard Browne and directed by Gordon Douglas.
23	23	"The Seventh Hand"	Bret, Samantha	March 2, 1958
Against his better judgement, Bret allows Samantha Crawford to sponsor him in a high-stakes poker game—which soon leads to an apparent double-cross and a cross-country chase. When Samantha idly wonders about what it might be like to marry Bret, he responds, "We couldn't afford it." Sam Buffington, the portly character actor who portrays a primary villain of this episode, repeatedly described by various characters throughout the story as having a face like a frog, eventually committed suicide at age 28 in 1960. He also appears in four other episodes playing different characters, including Ponca in "The Quick and the Dead." James Philbrook, in his first year as an actor, portrays Sloan in "The Seventh Hand." Teleplay by Russell S. Hughes from a story by Howard Browne and directed by Richard L. Bare.
24	24	"Plunder of Paradise"	Bart, Big Mike	March 9, 1958
Bart and Big Mike (Leo Gordon) hunt for a buried treasure in Mexico while being relentlessly shadowed by a group of bandits led by Jay Novello. This is the first Maverick episode in which James Garner does not appear at all—not even to introduce the show. With Ruta Lee as dance hall singer Dolly Muldoon and Joan Weldon as Grace Wheeler. Written and directed by Douglas Heyes, who also co-wrote Dolly's musical number, "Virtue Is Its Own Reward".
25	25	"Black Fire"	Bret	March 16, 1958
Hans Conried plays a friend who recruits Bret to borrow his identity for a family reunion, one that's presided over by a hard-bitten patriarch portrayed by Will Wright. Charles Bateman made his first screen appearance as Cousin Jeff Martin. One of only two Garner episodes mysteriously not included in Columbia House's 1990s library of series videotapes (the other was "Holiday at Hollow Rock"). Though James Garner introduced several Bart-only episodes, this marks the only time that Jack Kelly (unbilled) does so for a Bret-only episode. Kelly addresses the camera directly to introduce the episode, and then voice-over narrates the episode in character as Bart. Teleplay by Marion Hargrove from a story by Howard Browne, and directed by Leslie H. Martinson.
26	26	"Burial Ground of the Gods"	Bart	March 30, 1958
After getting robbed at gunpoint of $850, Bart traces thief Paisley Briggs (Claude Akins) to Denver, then to Wyoming. Once there, Bart gets hired to guard the now-penniless Briggs, who has convinced putative widow Laura Stanton (Nancy Gates) that her husband Phillip (Charles Cooper) is still alive, and that Briggs is the only person who knows where to find him. Clark Gable look-alike Robert Lowery portrays Paul Asher, the man who has been keeping Laura company since her husband disappeared. Controversial beauty Saundra Edwards plays a ravishing house maid who dines with an inquisitive Bart. Written and directed by Douglas Heyes.
27	27	"Seed of Deception"	Bret, Bart	April 13, 1958
The Maverick brothers are mistaken for Doc Holliday and Wyatt Earp in this two-brother episode. Huggins' wife Adele Mara plays a saloon dancer, and Bart is still wearing his grey suit. Ron Hayes made one of his first acting appearances in the episode and Joi Lansing briefly appears as "Doll." Frank Ferguson portrays the comical sheriff and Bing Russell plays one of the bullying henchmen. Bret and Bart would technically appear in sixteen episodes together over the course of the series but only share a large amount of screen time in eleven of them. The others are actually Garner's episodes with brief appearances by Kelly except "The Jeweled Gun", in which their roles were switched at the last minute due to a schedule conflict and Garner wound up making his single cameo appearance in a Kelly installment. "Seed of Deception" was written by Montgomery Pittman and directed by Richard L. Bare.

=== Season 2 (1958–1959) ===
Garner and Kelly continue as alternating leads, with the odd 'team-up' episode. Semi-regulars Samatha Crawford (Diane Brewster) and Dandy Jim Buckley (Efrem Zimbalist Jr.) exit partway through the season; new semi-regulars include Cindy Lou Brown (Arlene Howell) and Gentleman Jack Darby (Richard Long). Big Mike McComb (Leo Gordon) also returns from the first season.

No. overall	No. in series	Title	Featured character(s)	Original release date
28	1	"The Day They Hanged Bret Maverick"	Bret	September 21, 1958
Three eyewitnesses identify Bret Maverick as the man who robbed Wells Fargo of $40,000, and a desperate Maverick soon finds himself trapped in jail while the citizenry construct a gallows for him right outside the window. Bret recalls that he and his brother had flipped a coin earlier to decide which Maverick would travel in what direction, ruminating that if it had landed differently, Bart would be sitting in that cell instead. This episode marks the debut of the vocal version of the closing theme song, though it would not be heard again for several episodes. With Whitney Blake, Ray Teal, and Jay Novello. Written and directed by Douglas Heyes.
29	2	"The Lonesome Reunion"	Bret	September 28, 1958
While waiting for Bart in a Denver hotel lobby, Bret comes to the aid of a woman who is being followed. He soon finds himself knocked unconscious, and mixed up with several gangsters looking to recover a $120,000 bank heist haul they buried near a town called Lonesome. The episode's cast features John Russell, Joanna Barnes, John Qualen, Claire Carleton, Richard Reeves, Byron Foulger and Robert Carson. Bart is heard in voice over, reading out a letter he wrote to Bret, but does not appear (and Jack Kelly is unbilled). Oddly, the lead-in is like the first seven episodes of the series, prior to Kelly as Bart joining the show, without the opening featuring Garner's and Kelly's names, and without Garner's character's name after Garner's name during the titles at the beginning of the actual episode ("...as Bret Maverick"). Directed by Richard L. Bare from a teleplay by Gene Levitt based on a story by Levitt and Bob Mitchell.
30	3	"Alias Bart Maverick"	Bart, Cindy Lou, Gentleman Jack	October 5, 1958
Bart encounters Gentleman Jack, who has a $1000 reward on his head—and who instigates an identity switch with an unknowing Bart. The episode features the debuts of Richard Long as Gentleman Jack Darby, a variation on Zimbalist's Dandy Jim Buckley character, and Arlene Howell as Cindy Lou Brown, a showgirl who is thoroughly charmed by Darby. Written and directed by Douglas Heyes.
31	4	"The Belcastle Brand"	Bret	October 12, 1958
A destitute Bret goes to work for a family of British nobles living in Wyoming, leading them in a safari across the desert. This is the first episode to feature Ed Reimers' spoken intro ("Maverick! Starring James Garner and Jack Kelly!"). As well, the vocal end theme also returns for this episode, though not yet permanently. With Reginald Owen. Written by Marion Hargrove and directed by Leslie H. Martinson.
32	5	"High Card Hangs"	Bart, Dandy Jim	October 19, 1958
Bart and Dandy Jim Buckley (Efrem Zimbalist, Jr.) are partners in a mining stake in the Black Hills, but things go awry when a rival prospector is murdered, and Bart and two others are accused of the crime. Bart must work with Dandy Jim to expose the real murderer—and quickly, as Bart is scheduled for the gallows the next morning. Note how much warmer Dandy Jim Buckley's friendship with Bart appears to be than his rivalry with Bart's brother Bret in the subsequent episode "The Jail at Junction Flats". With Dan Sheridan and Martin Landau. Directed by Richard L. Bare.
33	6	"Escape to Tampico"	Bret	October 26, 1958
A wanted American killer is living in Tampico; Bret is hired to trick him into crossing back over the US border where he can be arrested. Set primarily in Mexico, this episode features Gerald Mohr as a variation of Humphrey Bogart's Casablanca character, shot on the original Casablanca set. With Barbara Lang and John Hubbard. Written and directed by Douglas Heyes.
34	7	"The Judas Mask"	Bart	November 2, 1958
Bart's chasing a Norwegian dance hall girl who robbed him of $20,000, hoping to catch her before she vanishes into Mexico. With Anna-Lisa and John Vivyan. Written by Gene Levitt and directed by Richard L. Bare.
35	8	"The Jail at Junction Flats"	Bret, Dandy Jim	November 9, 1958
Bret becomes a partner in one of Dandy Jim Buckley's schemes, but soon finds himself having to break his partner out of jail if he wants to collect his share of the proceeds. According to Roy Huggins in his comprehensive Archive of American Television interview, the memorable ending, unique for the era, offended many viewers when the episode was first broadcast. Efrem Zimbalist Jr. again portrays occasionally recurring character Dandy Jim Buckley, Dan "Hoss Cartwright" Blocker briefly appears in flashback as murderous gunslinger Hognose Hughes and Patrick McVey plays frustrated Sheriff Morrison Pyne. The humorous teleplay was written by Marion Hargrove from a story by Elmer Kelton, and directed by Walter Doniger.
36	9	"The 39th Star"	Bart	November 16, 1958
A coincidental pair of identical suitcases create a potentially lethal quandary for Bart. With Bethel Leslie and John Litel. Written by Marion Hargrove and directed by Richard L. Bare.
37	10	"Shady Deal at Sunny Acres"	Bret, Bart, Dandy Jim, Samantha, Big Mike, Gentleman Jack, Cindy Lou	November 23, 1958
Bret is robbed by a ruthless banker (John Dehner) after depositing an evening's poker winnings, setting in motion an intricate sting operation to recover the money. While Bart and all of the series' recurring characters join forces to dupe the banker, Bret sits whittling in a rocking chair across the street from the bank every day, responding to the queries of the local townspeople curious about how he plans to recover his money with "I'm working on it." The only episode to feature all five of the recurring Maverick supporting characters from the first two seasons (all of whom, along with Dehner, are listed in the opening credits), and the final appearance for both Samantha Crawford (Diane Brewster) and Dandy Jim Buckley (Efrem Zimbalist, Jr.), who both became regulars in other series and were subsequently unavailable as a result. Writer Roy Huggins notes the close patterning of the first half of later movie The Sting to this episode in his Archive of American Television interview. In 1997, TV Guide ranked this episode #81 on its list of the 100 Greatest Episodes. The teleplay was written by Roy Huggins from a story by Douglas Heyes and directed by Leslie H. Martinson.
38	11	"Island in the Swamp"	Bret	November 30, 1958
A township of Louisiana swamp dwellers imprison Bret after he's discovered tied up and floating down the river in a boat. With Edgar Buchanan, Erin O'Brien, and Arlene Howell—who does not play Cindy Lou Brown here, despite having just portrayed the character in the previous episode. Howell would return to the role of Cindy Lou Brown twelve episodes later, in "Passage To Fort Doom". Written and directed by Montgomery Pittman.
39	12	"Prey of the Cat"	Bart	December 7, 1958
A rare Maverick episode that could be described as "Western noir". When Bart is seriously injured after a wildcat spooks his horse, his old friend Pete Stillman (Wayne Morris) puts him up over the winter to recover. But during Bart's extended recuperation, Pete's bitter and increasingly unbalanced wife Kitty (Patricia Barry) develops a potentially deadly erotic fixation on Bart. Written and directed by Douglas Heyes.
40	13	"Holiday at Hollow Rock"	Bret	December 14, 1958
Bret rides into Hollow Rock, Wyoming, to bet on the annual horse race, stopwatch in hand. One of two Garner episodes (the other being "Black Fire") somehow not included in Columbia House's 1990s library of series videotapes. Features Saundra Edwards and Tod Griffin. Written by Howard Browne and directed by Richard L. Bare.
41	14	"The Spanish Dancer"	Bart, Gentleman Jack	December 28, 1958
Bart joins up with Gentleman Jack, both looking to make their fortunes as auctioneers and as poker players in an isolated boom town. Both also vie for the affections of the titular dancer, played by Adele Mara (Roy Huggins' wife). Slim Pickens plays a supporting role. Written by Eric Freiwald from a story by Homer McCoy and Oscar Millard, and directed by James V. Kern.
42	15	"Game of Chance"	Bret, Bart	January 4, 1959
Bart is swindled by a French countess (Roxane Berard) and her uncle (Marcel Dalio) – so he calls in Bret to help engineer a gambit to retrieve his money. Bart compares the endeavor specifically to the complex "Sunny Acres" sting that he helped pull for Bret. Bret and Bart share close to equal time in this episode. Samantha Crawford and Dandy Jim Buckley are mentioned in passing, but do not appear. Written by Gene Levitt and directed by James V. Kern.
43	16	"Gun-Shy"	Bret	January 11, 1959
Bret is hot on the trail of half a million dollars' worth of buried Confederate gold, but is constantly thwarted by a square-jawed, upstanding lawman. This is Maverick's Gunsmoke spoof, with Ben Gage as marshal Mort Dooley (a comical version of marshal Matt Dillon) and Walker Edmiston as the Chester character. There's also a brief, veiled dig at Have Gun Will Travel. Also featuring Andra Martin as the leading lady, Marshall Kent as "Doc", Reginald Owen as rival con man Freddie Wilkins, and Gage Clarke as Badger, an amusing encyclopedia salesman. Dooley mentions the unseen "Hognose Hughes", a character seen in "The Jail At Junction Flats" and played by Bonanza's Dan Blocker in that episode. Written by Marion Hargrove and directed by Leslie H. Martinson.
44	17	"Two Beggars on Horseback"	Bret, Bart	January 18, 1959
The Maverick brothers each have a cashier's check for $10,000 which they use as poker stakes ... only to find out the issuing company has gone bust while they've been playing at the table. However, the opportunistic Jessamy Longacre (Patricia Barry) knows how one—and only one—Maverick can get his money back. Soon the brothers (with Jessamy hot on their trails) are forced into a comically treacherous cross-country race to cash their check at the only branch of the bank that hasn't yet received word of the bankruptcy. This episode marks the only time in the series in which Kelly's character wears a black hat; both brothers wear black hats in the opening sequences until Bart trades his to a stable operator in order to secure a horse, immediately . The title stems from an otherwise unrelated play by George S. Kaufman and Marc Connelly called Beggar on Horseback. With Ray Teal as Stryker, Will Wright as a retired Confederate general, and Roscoe Ates makes a typically brief and amusing appearance. Written and directed by Douglas Heyes.
45	18	"The Rivals"	Bret, Bart	January 25, 1959
The only episode starring both James Garner and Roger Moore. Bret switches identities with a wealthy playboy, who is trying to win the heart of a lady (Patricia "Pat" Crowley) who claims to have only disdain for money. The story is based on a play by Richard Brinsley Sheridan originally produced in 1775, and features Roger Moore as Jack Vandergeld, who ends up posing as "Bret Maverick" for much of the episode. Moore would later be a regular series lead for 14 episodes as cousin "Beau Maverick" in season 4, after Garner left the series—consequently, this is the only episode featuring Garner and Moore together. Moore is billed at the beginning of the episode along with Garner and Kelly, an honor rarely accorded a guest star in the series and only then for studio contract players. Bart appears only briefly, including a deep focus 3-shot at the episode's opening. Dandy Jim Buckley is mentioned, but does not appear. Jack's father, Archibald, is played by Neil Hamilton. Written by Marion Hargrove from the 1775 play by Richard Brinsley Sheridan and directed by Leslie H. Martinson. See separate article.
46	19	"Duel at Sundown"	Bret, Bart	February 1, 1959
Bret's old friend (Edgar Buchanan) tries to marry him off to his daughter (Abby Dalton) but she's in love with villainous gunfighter Red Hardigan (Clint Eastwood). Though Bret would prefer to avoid violence, things soon escalate into a wild fistfight. Given time, a lethal showdown with Hardigan (who is a far faster and more accurate shot than Bret) seems inevitable. Bart appears briefly. Written by Richard J. Collins from a story by Howard Browne, and directed by Arthur Lubin. See separate article.
47	20	"Yellow River"	Bart	February 8, 1959
After losing his stake in a bank robbery, Bart crosses paths with a pretty con artist (Patricia Breslin). When her story proves false, he rides after her only to find she is partnering a cattle drive—one whose trail-hands are being murdered one by one. During the episode, Bart twice compares Breslin's character of Abby to Maverick semi-regular Samantha Crawford ... perhaps because this script is recycled from the second season Cheyenne episode "The Dark Rider", which features Diane Brewster's first appearance as Samantha Crawford, the year before the first season of Maverick. In the Cheyenne episode, she had introduced herself to Cheyenne with her full name "Samantha Crawford" before proceeding to double-cross and rob everyone in sight, including Cheyenne himself. The supporting cast of Yellow River features Peter Miles, portly character actors Sam Buffington and Tol Avery, and Robert Conrad in one of his earliest acting roles. Written by Howard Browne (who had co-written the Cheyenne "The Dark Rider" script with Roy Huggins) and directed by David Lowell Rich.
48	21	"The Saga of Waco Williams"	Bret	February 15, 1959
Bret partners up with Waco Williams (Wayde Preston), an almost too-good-to-be-true cowboy with an unbending moral code and an unshakable belief that things will work out. Bret is in such disbelief of Waco's actions, he actually breaks the fourth wall and addresses the audience at the episode's conclusion. Features R. G. Armstrong as a cattle baron, Brad Johnson as his contemptible son and his strong-willed daughter, played by future Academy Award winner Louise Fletcher (she won the Oscar for her portrayal of the villainous Nurse Ratched in One Flew over the Cuckoo's Nest). Written by Gene L. Coon from a story by Montgomery Pittman, and directed by Leslie H. Martinson. Writer-producer Stephen J. Cannell explained in his Archive of American Television interview that he later used Williams as the prototype for "Lance White," Tom Selleck's recurring role on Garner's subsequent series The Rockford Files.
49	22	"The Brasada Spur"	Bart	February 22, 1959
Bart has an unexpectedly difficult time inveigling his way into a high-stakes poker game—the only way in is to win the favor of the richest, most stunningly beautiful woman in town (Julie Adams), who has a suspicious nature and a retinue of staff to keep people like Bart away from her. The title refers to a railroad line which Bart wins shares in ... but all is not as it seems as a complex cat-and-mouse game is being played. Bart wears a flamboyantly broad-brimmed hat in this episode to match stock footage of Gary Cooper in Saratoga Trunk (1945). "The Brasada Spur" was directed by Casablanca star Paul Henreid.
50	23	"Passage to Fort Doom"	Bart, Cindy Lou	March 8, 1959
Bart signs on as a wagon train guide through hostile territory, in this episode that examines the power of a decision to be courageous under fire rather than running the other way. Featuring Diane McBain, Ron Hayes, and Arlene Howell in her final appearance as Cindy Lou Brown. Written by producer Roy Huggins, this is the only episode scripted with Jack Kelly in mind during the early seasons; according to Huggins' videotaped reminiscences for the Archive of American Television, he had previously given orders that the writers always picture Garner as Maverick regardless of which actor would end up playing the part. For episodes featuring both Bret and Bart, the characters were labeled "Maverick 1" and "Maverick 2", with Garner given first choice due to his seniority. Directed by Paul Henreid.
51	24	"Two Tickets to Ten Strike"	Bret	March 15, 1959
Bret finds himself momentarily attracted to a ditzy but charmingly appealing young woman (Connie Stevens) whose stage fare plus an additional hundred dollars has been paid by an unknown benefactor, then hunts down some thugs in the wake of being abruptly assaulted on the street. The episode, a hybrid of comedy, mystery, and action drama, features a young Adam West as a comedic villain with amazing dialogue. Veteran Western film star Roscoe Ates appears as genially cooperative Joe the barber and the supporting cast includes scheming Lyle Talbot and a nefarious but beautiful Andrea King. Written and directed by Douglas Heyes.
52	25	"Betrayal"	Bart	March 22, 1959
While being held up by masked bandits, Bart realizes that another stagecoach passenger recognizes the voice of one of the robbers. With Pat Crowley and Ruta Lee as romantic rivals and Don "Red" Barry as a sheriff. Ruta Lee had played different characters in two other episodes, "The Comstock Conspiracy" with Garner and "The Plunder of Paradise" with Kelly. Oddly, Pat Crowley, who had recently appeared with James Garner and Roger Moore in the episode "The Rivals", alternated her billing as Pat or Patricia for various Maverick episodes; she was not related to Kathleen Crowley but both appeared on most of the same narrative television series of the era, though the two Crowleys never worked together in the same episode on any show. Written by Richard Macauley and James O'Hanlon from a story by Winston Miller, and directed by Leslie H. Martinson.
53	26	"The Strange Journey of Jenny Hill"	Bret, Big Mike	March 29, 1959
Singer Jenny Hill (Peggy King) can't figure out why Bret keeps following her from town to town...but it would seem to have something to do with a trial involving Big Mike (Leo Gordon in his final appearance). Explicitly set in June 1878, Jenny twice sings the song "Some Sunday Morning" — originally written in 1945 for the Warner Bros. film San Antonio — which she sang live on the set rather than lip-syncing to a recording. Also features Sig Ruman as Jenny's manager, William Schallert as her accompanist Carl, and frequent series character actor Chubby Johnson in a prominent unbilled cameo appearance as a drunk in an alley. Written and directed by Douglas Heyes.

=== Season 3 (1959–1960) ===
Writer/creator Roy Huggins leaves the show. Garner and Kelly remain the leads. Of the recurring characters, only Gentleman Jack Darby returns for season 3, and only for one episode. Three new characters, obvious replacements for Dandy Jim Buckley and Samantha Crawford, are seen, but only for two episodes each: Edward Ashley's impeccably dressed and outwardly charming gambler Nobby Ned Wingate (also spelled "Wyngate"); Kathleen Crowley's cheerful, scheming gold-digger Melanie Blake; and Mona Freeman's determined but slightly psychotic seeming operator Modesty Blaine.

No. overall	No. in series	Title	Featured character(s)	Original release date
54	1	"Pappy"	Bret, Bart	September 13, 1959
The Mavericks set out to investigate when it appears that an 18-year-old girl is set to marry their Pappy. Features dual roles for series stars Garner and Kelly, as Beauregard "Pappy" Maverick and Uncle Bentley Maverick, respectively. As part of the proceedings, Bart impersonates Dandy Jim Buckley for most of the episode. Series creator Roy Huggins, who had left the show at the conclusion of the previous season, complained in his Archive of American Television interview that Bret and Bart's "Pappy" was never meant to be seen by the audience (in the series' earliest references, he appears to have already died) and that Huggins was disappointed when the first thing the new producer (Coles Trapnell) did was construct an episode including the character. Also note that at one point, Pappy explicitly mentions that he had raised two children and didn't want a third; this would seem to contradict the later appearances of Brent Maverick (played by Robert Colbert), the third Maverick brother. "Pappy" was written and directed by Montgomery Pittman and features Adam West, Troy Donahue, Henry Daniell, Kaye Elhardt, Virginia Gregg and Chubby Johnson.
55	2	"Royal Four-Flush"	Bart	September 20, 1959
Bart runs across conman Capt. Rory Fitzgerald (David Frankham), who still owes him $4000 from a poker game in St. Louis. In an effort to get the money he's owed, Bart sticks to Fitz like glue, and gets mixed up with Fitz's companions: a woman claiming to be the Countess de la Fontaine (Roxane Berard), widowed mining magnate Placer Jack Mason (Arch Johnson), and Jack's suspicious and very protective children. Berard's second of four appearances, the others being "Game of Chance" with James Garner and Jack Kelly, "The Resurrection of Joe November" with Garner, and "Diamond Flush" with Roger Moore.
56	3	"The Sheriff of Duck 'n' Shoot"	Bret, Bart	September 27, 1959
After appearing to have accidentally knocked out a drunken cowboy (it was actually a rearing horse's hoof), Bret is manipulated into becoming the sheriff of wildly boisterous town "Duck 'n' Shoot", and tries to outfox—rather than outgun—both the criminals and the town officials who stuck him in the job. Bret's brother Bart appears in several scenes. Featuring Peggy McCay as Melissa Maybrook and Chubby Johnson in an extremely large role as the town's genial deputy. The episode somewhat foreshadows Garner's later comedic movies Support Your Local Sheriff! (1969) and Support Your Local Gunfighter (1971). "The Sheriff of Duck 'n' Shoot" was written by William Driskill and directed by George Waggner.
57	4	"You Can't Beat the Percentage"	Bart	October 4, 1959
A cowboy is set to kill the new boss of one of Bart's old girlfriends, who now works at a gambling house. With Gerald Mohr as a white-suited saloon owner (similar to his role in the previous season's "Escape to Tampico") and Karen Steele as a fetching blonde with too many men orbiting around her in this fast-paced suspense thriller written and directed by George Waggner. Tim Graham portrays "Pop"; he would later play Willie the hotel clerk three episodes later in "Full House" with Joel Grey as Billy the Kid and Eben Bolt the following season in "Bolt from the Blue" written and directed by Robert Altman and starring Roger Moore.
58	5	"The Cats of Paradise"	Bret, Modesty Blaine	October 11, 1959
Bret gets involved with Modesty Blaine (Mona Freeman) in a scheme to sell cats to a town plagued with rats. There he faces Buddy Ebsen as a trigger-happy sheriff, Richard Deacon as the town's undertaker, and Lance Fuller as a black-clad business-card carrying gunfighter modeled on Paladin. Historically, this episode takes place after 1876, as the sheriff was a witness to the 1876 death of Wild Bill Hicock (which is established in dialogue as having taken place some time ago). Wild-eyed Modesty would return a dozen episodes later in "The Cruise of the Cynthia B". Written by Ron Bishop and Wells Root from a story by L.P. Holmes, and directed by Arthur Lubin.
59	6	"A Tale of Three Cities"	Bart	October 18, 1959
Bart is held up at gunpoint by a female robber (Pat Crowley), and then is kicked out of town by the sheriff. Arriving in the neighboring town of Brotherly without a penny, Bart tracks the robber while making inspirational anti-gambling lectures—so that he can get paid in food. Ben Gage does his marshal Matt Dillon parody again; also featuring Ray Teal as a Sheriff Murray (Teal would go on to a semi-regular role as Sheriff Roy Coffee on Bonanza).
60	7	"Full House"	Bret	October 25, 1959
Bret is mistaken for one Foxy Smith (Clark Gable look-alike Robert Lowery), who is assembling ten of the West's most notorious outlaws for a major heist. Members of the gang include Cole Younger (Gregory Walcott), Billy the Kid (Joel Grey), Sam Bass (Kelly Thordsen), and an alluringly amorous Belle Starr (Jean Willes). In historical terms, this episode would have to take place in 1876 or earlier, as Cole Younger started a 25-year prison sentence that year—except that "Belle Starr" was not known by that name until she married Sam Starr in 1880. Also, note that Billy the Kid appears in this episode despite it being prominently mentioned four episodes earlier (in "The Sheriff of Duck 'n' Shoot") that he had already been killed by Pat Garrett. Garner performs a bravura pistol-twirling exhibition as part of the plot, Nancy Kulp briefly appears as a drunken waitress with slightly slurred speech, and Tim Graham portrays Willie the hotel clerk; Graham would later portray the titular character during the fourth season in "Bolt from the Blue" written and directed by Robert Altman. "Full House" was directed by Robert Gordon and written by Jerry Davis from a story by Hugh Benson and Coles Trapnell.
61	8	"The Lass With the Poisonous Air"	Bart	November 1, 1959
While winning regularly at a series of private Denver poker games, Bart leaves promptly every afternoon for a rendezvous with a mysterious femme fatale (Joanna Moore). The story for this episode is credited to Roy Huggins, who had left the series at the end of the previous season. With Stacy Keach, Sr.
62	9	"The Ghost Soldiers"	Bret	November 8, 1959
An extremely beleaguered Bret must figure out some way to cope with an ocean of Native Americans laying siege to an almost-empty fort. Everyone inside seems about to be killed, including him. This episode is told from multiple perspectives.
63	10	"Easy Mark"	Bart	November 15, 1959
Bart's paid handsomely to impersonate cactus-fancier Cornelius Van Rennselaer Jr. on a railroad journey, but he doesn't realize that others on the train will stop at nothing to keep "Cornelius" from completing his trip. With Edgar Buchanan, Pippa Scott, Jack Buetel, and Nita Talbot as a woman hired to "distract" Cornelius—and who does so with notable enthusiasm. Buchanan and Buetel had co-starred as Roy Bean and Jeff Taggart in the 1956 NBC color television series Judge Roy Bean.
64	11	"A Fellow's Brother"	Bret, Bart	November 22, 1959
Bret is wrongly identified as a wanted thief and killer, and must contend with a bumbling sheriff and bounty hunter who are determined to capture him for the reward money, as well as vengeful family members of the killer's victim ... and a would-be sidekick whose hero-worship of Bret almost always makes things worse. Though a major cog in the episode's story, Bart appears only briefly. With Adam West as a gunslinger.
65	12	"Trooper Maverick"	Bart	November 29, 1959
Caught gambling in a frontier fort, Bart forgoes 180 days in the stockade by enlisting in the cavalry—with a secret mission to expose a traitorous ring of thieves. With Suzanne Lloyd.
66	13	"Maverick Springs"	Bret, Bart, Melanie Blake	December 6, 1959
Bret is hired by a wealthy Texas woman to bring her wayward brother home from Saratoga Springs. The project soon gets trickier than Bret anticipated, and eventually brother Bart is called in to help. With Kathleen Crowley as the gold-digging Melanie Blake, Tol Avery as the villain, and Sig Ruman as Bart's accomplice Professor Kronkheit. The 1970s episode of The Rockford Files entitled "The Great Blue Lake Land Development Company" bears some similarity to this episode—in interviews, Rockford writer Stephen J. Cannell has credited elements of some Maverick episodes as inspirations for many of The Rockford Files scripts.
67	14	"The Goose-Drownder"	Bart, Gentleman Jack	December 13, 1959
Bart and Gentleman Jack Darby are stranded in a decaying Nevada ghost town during a week-long downpour (a "goose-drownder") – but the tedium is broken when a stagecoach turns up carrying a desperate gang, including one of Bart's lost loves (Fay Spain). This Maverick variation on Key Largo features the final appearance of Richard Long as Darby. This is also the only instance of one of the five recurring supporting characters from the "Shady Deal at Sunny Acres" episode appearing after writer/producer Roy Huggins' departure at the end of the second season because most had all moved, as regulars, into new television series such as Bourbon Street Beat (Long, Howell), 77 Sunset Strip (Zimbalist, later also Long), and Leave It to Beaver (Brewster), and were consequently unable to appear as semi-regulars on another show. Also featuring H.M. Wynant and Will Wright. Written by Leonard Praskins and directed by Arthur Lubin.
68	15	"A Cure for Johnny Rain"	Bret	December 20, 1959
Bret and his travelling companions are held up at gunpoint on a stagecoach. Later, when Bret arrives in the frontier town of Apocalypse, he encounters the thief again: Johnny Rain (William Reynolds), the most beloved citizen in town. But Johnny has no memory of the hold-up at all—at least while he's sober... Also guest starring Dolores Donlon and John Vivyan. Written by Leonard Praskins and directed by Montgomery Pittman.
69	16	"The Marquesa"	Bart	January 3, 1960
Adele Mara guest stars as a woman with a competing claim on a saloon which Bart wins in a poker game. Other guest stars are Rodolfo Hoyos, Jr., as Miguel Ruiz, Jay Novello as Pepe, and Morris Ankrum as Judge Jason Painter. Edward Ashley makes his first of two appearances as Nobby Ned Wingate (here spelled "Wyngate"), another rival gambler very similar to Dandy Jim Buckley for Bart to tangle with. Written by Leonard Praskins from a story by James Gunn and directed by Arthur Lubin.
70	17	"The Cruise of the Cynthia B"	Bret, Bart, Modesty Blaine	January 10, 1960
Bret is conned into buying an almost worthless—and seemingly cursed—riverboat. Mona Freeman returns as wild-eyed Modesty Blaine, last seen in "The Cats of Paradise" and this time another victim of the same conman. Bart appears only briefly. Also guest starring Gage Clarke and Jack Livesey. Written by R. Wright Campbell and directed by Andre de Toth.
71	18	"Maverick and Juliet"	Bret, Bart	January 17, 1960
En route to visit Pappy in St. Louis, Bret runs afoul of two families of feuding Missouri hillbillies. Soon, both Bret and Bart are caught up in the deadly war between the Montgomerys and the Carterets (who are patterned after the Montagues and the Capulets from Shakespeare's Romeo and Juliet as well as The Hatfields and the McCoys.).
72	19	"The White Widow"	Bart	January 24, 1960
After Bart's entire bankroll is stolen from a hotel safe, he accepts a position as a bodyguard for widowed bank president Wilma White (Julie Adams) who has been receiving death threats. With Pilar Seurat as Wilma's maid.
73	20	"Guatemala City"	Bret	January 31, 1960
Bret searches for an ex-girlfriend in tropical Guatemala and befriends a female street urchin. With Suzanne Storrs and Patric Knowles.
74	21	"The People's Friend"	Bart	February 7, 1960
After foiling an assassination attempt on a state senator, Bart is convinced to run for election in his place while the senator recovers from the bullet wound he received. Bart campaigning as a local politician foreshadows events to take place later in Jack Kelly's real life. Francis De Sales appears as Mayor Culpepper.
75	22	"A Flock of Trouble"	Bret	February 14, 1960
Bret wins a herd of sheep in a poker game, thinking they're cattle.....and soon discovers that the locals have an absolute murderous hatred of sheep farmers. Featuring Myrna Fahey, George D. Wallace and Tim Graham (who would reappear the following season as "Eben Bolt" in "Bolt from the Blue" written and directed by Robert Altman). "A Flock of Trouble" was written by Ron Bishop and Wells Root from a story by James Barnett and directed by Arthur Lubin.
76	23	"Iron Hand"	Bart	February 21, 1960
Having lost everything to Nobby Ned Wingate (Edward Ashley) in a poker game, Bart is forced to find work for himself and his disgruntled companions on a cattle drive. The title, incidentally, is meant literally; the villain wields his prosthetic iron hand like a club to murderously bludgeon those who cross him. Features a plump and acne-scarred Robert Redford in a large supporting role, the first professional screen appearance of his career. The cast also includes Anthony Caruso, Susan Morrow, Joan Elan, Lane Bradford and Lane Chandler. The episode was written by Gerald Drayson Adams and directed by Leslie Goodwins.
77	24	"The Resurrection of Joe November"	Bret	February 28, 1960
Bret accepts a well-paying job from an old family friend to dig up a grave, so that the body may be interred elsewhere—but the job soon becomes much more complex, and dangerous. Set primarily in New Orleans during Mardi Gras, with Roxane Berard, Joanna Barnes, Nita Talbot, and Don 'Red' Barry.
78	25	"The Misfortune Teller"	Bret, Melanie Blake	March 6, 1960
Bret rides in to a small Wyoming town where he's never been before, and is immediately thrown into jail, accused of having killed the town's mayor. The episode features another spoof of Gunsmoke's marshal Matt Dillon with Ben Gage; a turn by Alan Mowbray as Bret's astrology and numerology obsessed lawyer; and Kathleen Crowley in her phenomenally seductive Mae West-like role of Melanie Blake, last seen in "Maverick Springs" (which is briefly discussed). Half a century later, Kathleen Crowley was the one actress from the series that Garner singled out in his autobiography "The Garner Files" to express his admiration for her acting ability at length. Written by Leo Townsend and directed by Arthur Lubin.
79	26	"Greenbacks, Unlimited"	Bret	March 13, 1960
Bret is hired to track down a safecracker who is believed to be getting ready to rob the Denver State Bank. With Gage Clarke as a timid gambler with a surprising secret, and John Dehner as gang leader Big Ed Murphy, a role that Andrew Duggan would play in a subsequent season.

=== Season 4 (1960–1961) ===
Starring Jack Kelly and Roger Moore. Jack Kelly stays on as Bart Maverick, who now alternates the lead with Roger Moore as cousin Beau Maverick. Kelly and Moore are also featured in three two-cousin episodes. With the exception of a single two-brother episode held over from the third season, James Garner is no longer a part of the show. After the season's twenty-fifth episode, Moore also leaves. Toward the end of the season, Moore is briefly replaced by Garner lookalike Robert Colbert as Bart's brother Brent Maverick, who typically dresses in Bret Maverick's most frequent costume.

The episode "Bolt from the Blue" starring Roger Moore was written and directed by Robert Altman. Peter Breck would make one appearance as Doc Holliday in this season, becoming a semi-regular in the series' final episodes. All previous semi-regulars are dropped for this season, including the new characters (Modesty Blaine, Melanie Blake and Nobby Ned Wingate), just introduced in season 3. Modesty would eventually return for one episode in season 5 – but played by Kathleen Crowley, who had previously portrayed Melanie Blake.

No. overall	No. in series	Title	Featured character(s)	Original release date
80	1	"The Bundle From Britain"	Bart, Beau	September 18, 1960
Roger Moore's first appearance as Cousin Beau, met at the dock by Bart after arriving back from England. (Bart, incidentally, gives and spells out his full first name as "Bartrum" in this episode, and the ship the "Cynthia B" makes a return appearance.) An evenly balanced two-cousin episode according more or less equal time to each Maverick, as the two inadvertently get caught up in a kidnapping attempt on a spoiled British heir. Moore's character is the namesake nephew of Bret and Bart's father, the original Beau Maverick, portrayed by James Garner in "Pappy", the first episode of the third season. Moore was recruited at Jack L. Warner's insistence to fill the void left by Garner's departure from the series and actually wore some of the same suits that Garner had worn. Moore had also earlier performed many of Garner's scenes on a series called The Alaskans, using scripts that had been recycled from Maverick with only names and locales changed, an extremely common Warner Bros. custom at the time. The Maverick actors were almost exactly the same age; Garner had been 29 when the series began while Kelly and Moore were both less than a year older.
81	2	"Hadley's Hunters"	Bart	September 25, 1960
Bart runs afoul of a local sheriff who gives him five days to capture a criminal ... or else Bart will be hanged for his crimes. This comedic episode features several ten-second cameos from western leads in other Warner Brothers series, including Lawman (John Russell and Peter Brown), Bronco (Ty Hardin), Cheyenne (Clint Walker), and Sugarfoot (Will Hutchins). Edward Byrnes is also seen in a wordless cameo combing a horse's mane at "77 Cherokee Strip", and Bart visits Colt's office from the previously cancelled Colt .45 show, only to find it abandoned, dust-covered and derelict. Guest starring Edgar Buchanan as the flamboyant rogue sheriff, George Kennedy, Robert J. Wilke, Howard McNear, Andra Martin, Roscoe Ates and James Garner look-alike Robert Colbert (who would later that season be cast as "Brent Maverick") wearing a black hat on the back of his head the way Garner had before leaving the show. During the beginning of the fourth season, the network ran a television commercial for the series heralded by the announcer proclaiming, "Look who's blasting the West wide open!" that consisted almost entirely of clips from this episode, with the narrator referring to Maverick as "the series that always manages to stay on top." While there was no mention of Roger Moore in this commercial, the studio separately ran a different one featuring only clips with Moore from his solo episode "Kiz," with no mention of Jack Kelly.
82	3	"The Town That Wasn't There"	Beau	October 2, 1960
How could a whole town disappear without a trace? With Merry Anders, John Astin, Lane Chandler, and Steve Pendleton as marshal McCoy.
83	4	"Arizona Black Maria"	Bart	October 9, 1960
Lost in the desert with no water and having barely averted being scalped by a Native American, Bart winds up a passenger on a prison wagon. With a pre-Gilligan Alan Hale, Jr. and Joanna Barnes.
84	5	"Last Wire From Stop Gap"	Bart, Beau	October 16, 1960
Bart and Beau discover a secret telegraph station hidden in a cave in this two-cousin episode. Notice that when the Maverick cousins enter a room, Kelly goes in front, just as Garner normally used to, and when they're standing or sitting together in scenes, Kelly is usually on the viewer's left, just as Garner most frequently was in two-brother episodes. With Tol Avery and Olive Sturgess.
85	6	"Mano Nera"	Bart	October 23, 1960
Set in New Orleans, Gerald Mohr plays an Italian mobster who antagonizes Bart over a good luck charm after he bears witness to a murder during Mardi Gras.
86	7	"A Bullet For the Teacher"	Beau	October 30, 1960
With Kathleen Crowley, Max Baer, Jr., child actor Ronnie Dapo, Joan Tompkins as Mary Burch, and Brad Johnson as Jim Reardon. Co-written by Leo Gordon, who scripted several episodes in addition to playing "Big Mike McComb" the first two seasons.
87	8	"The Witch of Hound Dog"	Bart	November 6, 1960
With Wayde Preston and Anita Sands in a flashback story featuring a beautiful witch who appears to have magical powers. Stryker's Saloon (from "Two Beggars on Horseback") makes a reappearance where Bart is recounting his chance encounter following a poker game.
88	9	"Thunder From the North"	Beau	November 13, 1960
Beau finds himself embroiled with a nest of unscrupulous shopkeepers who've been methodically swindling the local Native American tribe. With Andra Martin as Indian princess Pale Moon.
89	10	"The Maverick Line"	Bret, Bart	November 20, 1960
Bret's last appearance for almost twenty years (until the 1978 TV-movie The New Maverick), in a memorable two-brother episode filmed the previous season with Buddy Ebsen as comical highwayman Rumsey Plum; Charles Fredericks, wielding a sawed-off shotgun, as loathsomely despicable murderer Shotgun Sparks; Peggy McCay (who'd appeared with Garner and Kelly in the previous season's "The Sheriff of Duck'n'Shoot") as the brothers' attractive partner in a business venture; and Chubby Johnson as a definitively cantankerous stagecoach driver. This was originally slated to be the first episode of the season until Garner was granted his freedom from Warner Bros. by the courts and the studio realized that he wouldn't return to the series, whereupon "The Bundle From Britain" with Roger Moore became the season's first offering instead. Bret and Bart have more or less equal screen time in this comical episode, in which they unexpectedly inherit a stagecoach business they don't want. During the show's opening titles prior to the beginning of the episode, with Ed Reimers announcing the cast in voiceover, the credits include only Garner and Kelly, as though it were the previous season, with no mention of Roger Moore. The Maverick brothers share more time together onscreen in this episode than any other, by a very wide margin, although the dialogue and camera are, as always, weighted toward Garner.
90	11	"Bolt From the Blue"	Beau	November 27, 1960
Written and directed by Robert Altman. Beau is mistaken for horse thief Benson January, and along with January's accomplice Eben Bolt, is captured by a posse intent on performing a hanging. Will Hutchins, star of the concurrent Warner Bros. Western series Sugarfoot, plays a frontier lawyer who may or may not be exactly the same character he portrays in the Sugarfoot series; when a woman asks if he's "Sugarfoot", he responds, "Never heard of him," which is exactly what the Sugarfoot character would probably say. The supporting cast also features Fay Spain as Angelica Garland, Tim Graham as Eben Bolt, actor and opera singer Richard Hale as Judge Hookstratten, Charles Fredericks as Starky, Percy Helton ("Sweetface" from Butch Cassidy and the Sundance Kid) as Bradley, and Owen Bush as Benson January.
91	12	"Kiz"	Beau	December 4, 1960
With Kathleen Crowley as millionairess Kiz, who tells Beau that a killer is after her, convincing him that she's crazy. The episode also features Peggy McCay in a remarkable performance as Kiz's cousin, Whit Bissell as "Clement Samuels," Tristram Coffin, Max Baer, Jr. and Don Beddoe. Clips from "Kiz" featuring Crowley and Moore were used in a television commercial for the series spotlighting "handsome Roger Moore", with no mention of Kelly.
92	13	"Dodge City or Bust"	Bart, Beau	December 11, 1960
With Howard McNear ("Floyd the Barber" on The Andy Griffith Show as well as "Doc Adams" in the original radio Gunsmoke). Bart's wanted for murder after protecting a ravishing woman (Diana Millay). Beau appears quite briefly at the end of the episode.
93	14	"The Bold Fenian Men"	Beau	December 18, 1960
An Army colonel (Arch Johnson) forces Beau to infiltrate Irish revolutionaries known as Fenians. Beautiful Irish lass Deidre Fogarty (Sharon Hugueny) is Beau's love interest. Her uncle, Terence, is portrayed by Irish character actor Arthur Shields (Oscar winner Barry Fitzgerald's brother). Lane Bradford is a sergeant assigned by the colonel to be Beau's contact. Welsh-born character actor Jack Livesey plays a Fenian leader. There are several allusions to other stories, for example when Arthur Shields assists a drunken Roger Moore to his room, asking "Going my way?", a reference to his brother Barry's Oscar-winning role.
94	15	"Destination Devil's Flat"	Bart	December 25, 1960
With Peter Breck (playing Sheriff Dan Trevor), just prior to his five appearances as Doc Holliday, Merry Anders, Chubby Johnson as a deputy, and an alcohol-loving dog with eerily humanoid responses to the notion of visiting the bar across the street.
95	16	"A State of Siege"	Bart	January 1, 1961
In New Mexico, Bart saves the life of a fellow gambler. As a gesture of thanks, the gambler offers Bart hospitality in his elaborate hacienda—which turns out to be practically deserted and under siege. With Ray Danton as Don Felipe and Slim Pickens as a stagecoach driver.
96	17	"Family Pride"	Beau	January 8, 1961
With Karl Swenson as a genial general, Denver Pyle as a blackthorn stick-wielding Irishman, and Stacy Keach, Sr. as a sheriff. An early plot point involves standard time, which was not introduced to the United States until 1883, eight years after the 1875 setting for this episode. Written by Catherine Kuttner.
97	18	"The Cactus Switch"	Bart, Beau	January 15, 1961
With Fay Spain as Lana Cain, Lane Chandler as the sheriff, Edgar Buchanan (later "Uncle Joe" on Petticoat Junction) as a ruthless villain, and Chubby Johnson. This a Bart (Jack Kelly) episode with Beau (Roger Moore) appearing briefly at the beginning and end.
98	19	"Dutchman's Gold"	Beau	January 22, 1961
With Mala Powers. Beau (Roger Moore) won a saloon in a poker game co-owned by a fetching woman. The popular titular song is incorporated into the episode to some extent.
99	20	"The Ice Man"	Bart	January 29, 1961
With Andrew Duggan, Shirley Knight, and a frozen corpse.
100	21	"Diamond Flush"	Beau	February 5, 1961
With Belgian gamine Roxane Berard; Berard was leading lady to Garner, Kelly, and Moore during the course of the series in four episodes, playing a different role each time. Co-written by actor/writer Leo Gordon, who had portrayed "Big Mike McComb" in the first two seasons; oddly, Gordon never appeared in a Maverick series episode that he wrote and was sometimes billed with his middle initial ("Leo V. Gordon") for writing but not acting credits. Gordon also wrote screenplays for some movies.
101	22	"Last Stop: Oblivion"	Bart	February 12, 1961
Fast-paced episode with a vicious Don "Red" Barry and a murderous Buddy Ebsen. Also featuring Suzanne Lloyd.
102	23	"Flood's Folly"	Beau	February 19, 1961
Trapped in a snowstorm in the Rockies, Beau (Roger Moore) takes shelter in an enormous closed hotel. With Jeanne Cooper as the attractive but unwelcoming hotel owner and Marlene Willis as her stunningly beautiful daughter.
103	24	"Maverick At Law"	Bart	February 26, 1961
With Tol Avery and Gage Clarke. Bank robbers stuck the money into Bart's saddlebags during their getaway.
104	25	"Red Dog"	Beau	March 5, 1961
With Lee Van Cleef, John Carradine, Sherry Jackson, and Mike Road, who later appeared in two more episodes as con man Pearly Gates. Beau Maverick's fitting final episode. Beau stumbles onto a cave which soon serves as the gathering place of a motley and dangerous gang of gunslinging criminals, including Carradine and Van Cleef. Former child star Sherry Jackson, definitely all grown up, delivers an energetic performance as a gunman's feisty and promiscuous woman. Unhappy with many of the other scripts, Roger Moore leaves the show, remarking that if his stories had been as good as Garner's in the first two seasons, he would have stayed.
105	26	"The Deadly Image"	Bart	March 12, 1961
This is the episode in which the lead character (Bart) has an evil exact double played by the same actor, with the same voice. Almost every narrative television series in the 1960s used this plot device at least once (including Star Trek). With Gerald Mohr (who later voiced "Reed Richards" in an early animated version of The Fantastic Four) and Dawn Wells (who subsequently portrayed "Mary Ann" in Gilligan's Island). Co-written by actor/writer Leo Gordon.
106	27	"Triple Indemnity"	Bart, Doc	March 19, 1961
With Peter Breck as Doc Holliday. This is the initial appearance of Breck in a recurring role as Holliday, whose interpretation is starkly different from the seriously realistic, darker portrayal by Gerald Mohr, who played the gunman in earlier episodes "The Quick and the Dead" and briefly in "Seed of Deception." Breck's Holliday is depicted as a marginally friendly acquaintance of Bart's, who initially helps set up a scheme. This relationship continues in four more episodes in Season Five. Also, while Garner had already left the program prior to the start of the season (Kelly and Moore are listed as the series stars in the opening credits), Bret is mentioned predominately throughout the plot as Bart purchases a $50,000 double indemnity insurance policy with his brother Bret (not cousin Beau) as the beneficiary. One memorable line of dialogue appears to be a writer's joke in reference to Garner's departure. In response to Holiday's question as to why wouldn't Bret just shoot him to collect the insurance money, Bart replies, "Because he's my brother! ... although we haven't been that close lately ..."
107	28	"The Forbidden City"	Brent, Bart	March 26, 1961
Strapping Garner look-alike Robert Colbert's debut as Brent Maverick, a character dressed exactly like Bret Maverick. Bart only appears rather briefly in this episode. Colbert's resemblance to Garner is rather eerie, especially in profile; like both James Garner and Roger Moore, he looks like the drawing in the opening credits. When the studio told contract player Colbert that he'd have to play a role patterned so precisely after Garner's, he said, "Put me in a dress and call me Brenda, but don't do this to me!"
108	29	"Substitute Gun"	Bart	April 2, 1961
Bart is nearly gunned down by a loose acquaintance he just encountered while passing through the town of Spearhead and is soon roped into a rivalry between the town's only two gambling halls. Coleen Gray plays the beautiful blonde wife of a saloon owner (Robert Rockwell), Walter Sande plays the observant town sheriff who saves Bart's life, Carlos Romero portrays dashing rival Clete Spain, and Joan Marshall plays Connie Malone, the alluring showgirl of the Golden Eagle Saloon.
109	30	"Benefit of Doubt"	Brent	April 9, 1961
The second and last appearance of Brent Maverick, and his only solo episode. With Slim Pickens in his second brief appearance as a stagecoach driver during this season (the first was in "A State of Siege"). The main plot involves a rivalry between two sisters, played by Randy Stuart and Elizabeth MacRae. Colbert, who resembled Garner and wore Bret's garb while portraying a different Maverick brother named Brent, was four years younger than Kelly and Moore, making him about the same age that Garner and Kelly had been in the series' first season. The studio had intended Kelly, Moore, and Colbert to appear in the series at the same time and numerous publicity shots of the three of them together survive. Colbert was originally intended to return for the following season but other circumstances intervened.
110	31	"The Devil's Necklace"	Bart	April 16, 1961
111	32	"The Devil's Necklace"	Bart	April 23, 1961
Part 1: The first part to the only two-part episode in the series, a flashback story involving a fort in which everyone but Bart had been killed by Indians. With Sharon Hugueny as Bart's love interest, Indian maiden Tawny who tells him (a number of times), "me, friend", John Dehner in a very different role than his usual elegantly smooth-talking con artist, John Hoyt, Steve Brodie, John Archer, Michael Forest and Chad Everett. Part 2: Bart and Tawny attempt to stop a Native American tribe from engaging in a violent uprising against a U.S. Army fort. The second part of the series' only two-part episode.

=== Season 5 (1961–1962) ===
Jack Kelly becomes the sole star of new Maverick offerings. At one point, the thirteen new episodes shot for the season were to consist of the first three episodes starring both Bart and Brent (played by Robert Colbert) to open the season then five more alternating solo episodes for each, to be continuously alternated with reruns of some of James Garner's earlier shows from the first two seasons (including "The Saga of Waco Williams" and "Shady Deal at Sunny Acres"), but Kelly wound up doing the thirteen new episodes without Colbert. During Kelly's new installments, neither Bret, Beau, nor Brent are ever mentioned; the series' new episodes had finally reverted to the original single-Maverick formula observed for the initial seven episodes, only with Kelly as Maverick instead of Garner. However, Garner's name once again appears in the weekly series opening credits before all the newly produced shows, albeit now with second billing under Kelly (Ed Reimers announces "Maverick! Starring Jack Kelly and James Garner!" each week over the opening credits).

The theme song for this season is souped up with a brisker pace, more flamboyant instrumentation, and sound effects such as the riverboat's ringing bell.

Peter Breck returns as Doc Holliday, becoming a semi-regular in these final episodes. He appears in 4 of the 13 episodes produced for this season, including the series finale. Mike Road appears as "Pearly" Gates in two episodes, alongside Kathleen Crowley as Gates' companion Marla. Crowley also appears in the final episode as Modesty Blaine, a role played twice in the third season by Mona Freeman.

No. overall	No. in series	Title	Featured character(s)	Original release date
112	1	"Dade City Dodge"	Bart, Pearly Gates, Marla	September 17, 1961
After getting cheated at a racetrack by gambler/con artist Pearly Gates (Mike Road) and his accomplice Marla (Kathleen Crowley), Maverick travels to Dade City, Texas, to find Gates and get his money back. Soon enough, Maverick is caught up in an even bigger con orchestrated by the town's most prominent citizens, including their undertaker (Gage Clarke). Pearly and Marla, both clearly set up here to be recurring characters, return in "The Troubled Heir".
113	2	"The Art Lovers"	Bart	October 1, 1961
With James Westerfield, Jack Cassidy, John Hoyt and Maurine Dawson; Maverick is sentenced to being a butler after being cheated by an acquaintance.
114	3	"The Golden Fleecing"	Bart	October 8, 1961
With John Qualen, Olive Sturgess, Richard Loo and Paula Raymond; Maverick becomes an impromptu stock broker, dealing in San Francisco's Chinatown. Paula Raymond's sole appearance in the series.
115	4	"Three Queens Full"	Bart	November 12, 1961
Bonanza spoof with Jim Backus, Merry Anders and Kasey Rogers, featuring the characters "Moose" and "Small Paul" Wheelwright. Amusingly, Backus (famous for providing the cartoon voice of "Mr. Magoo") plays the patriarch patterned after stentorian-voiced Lorne Greene's Bonanza role.
116	5	"A Technical Error"	Bart, Doc Holliday	November 26, 1961
With Ben Gage as a sheriff (spoofing marshal Matt Dillon and Gunsmoke, as he had done in "Gun-Shy", "A Tale of Three Cities", and "The Misfortune Teller"), and Reginald Owen, who purposely loses his near-bankrupt bank to Maverick in a card game.
117	6	"Poker Face"	Bart	January 7, 1962
With Tol Avery as a pompous and corrupt enemy of Maverick, Rudolph Acosta as a bandit chieftain, Carlos Rivas as a henchman, Richard Hale as a missionary, and William Fawcett as a stagecoach driver; while traveling by stagecoach, Maverick strikes a bargain with a highwayman. Directed by Michael O'Herlihy. Teleplay by Fred Eggers from a story by Jennings Perry.
118	7	"Mr. Muldoon's Partner"	Bart	February 11, 1962
An Irish-themed leprechaun comedy with Mickey Rooney's lookalike son, Tim Rooney. The only episode in which Kelly wears his hat on the back of his head for long stretches the way Garner used to.
119	8	"Epitaph for a Gambler"	Bart	March 4, 1962
With film noir queen Marie Windsor (who appeared in the first season in "The Quick and the Dead"), Robert J. Wilke, Frank Albertson, Fred Beir, and Joyce Meadows. Maverick wishes he hadn't won so much money from that casino after all in this absorbing episode written by George F. Slavin and directed by Irving J. Moore.
120	9	"The Maverick Report"	Bart, Doc Holliday	March 11, 1962
Maverick wins a newspaper that's about to be sued by a senator.
121	10	"Marshal Maverick"	Bart, Doc Holliday	April 1, 1962
With versatile John Dehner in a comedic episode with numerous twists and turns involving Wyatt Earp and Doc Holliday.
122	11	"The Troubled Heir"	Bart, Pearly Gates, Marla	April 8, 1962
With Kathleen Crowley, Alan Hale, Jr., and Mike Road (as "Pearly Gates"). Gates and Marla (Crowley) rob Maverick so they can run off and marry.
123	12	"The Money Machine"	Bart	April 15, 1962
With Andrew Duggan as Big Ed Murphy, a role played in "Greenbacks, Unlimited" during the third season by John Dehner. Murphy sells a machine that somehow magically manufactures money to Maverick's headstrong young cousin, portrayed by Kathy Bennett. Everyone in this episode, related or not, jarringly refers to Maverick's father as "Pappy Maverick", a nickname used only by the Maverick brothers themselves in all earlier episodes (even the younger Beau, played by Roger Moore, referred to his cousin Bart's father as "Uncle Beau").
124	13	"One of Our Trains Is Missing"	Bart, Doc Holliday, Modesty Blaine	April 22, 1962
With Kathleen Crowley as Modesty Blaine, a role played in two third season episodes by Mona Freeman. Frequent Maverick supporting player Gage Clarke also appears. The episode and the series ends with Maverick (wearing his hat on the back of his head the way Garner had usually worn his), Doc Holliday (Peter Breck), and Modesty Blaine walking the train tracks while arguing about how they'd divide a reward that Maverick had just received from Diamond Jim Brady. Jack Kelly always maintained that no one from the studio called to tell him that the series had been canceled; he read about it in the newspaper.
