= Marlene Willis =

American singer (1942–1982)

- Marlene Willis in The Andy Griffith Show 1960
- Born: January 13, 1942; Levelland, Texas
- Died: March 29, 1982 (aged 40); Los Angeles, California
- Occupations: Singer, actress
- Years active: 1953–1965
- Known for: Rockabilly Baby; Attack of the Puppet People
- Spouse: Kerry Hodges (m. 1966)

Marlene Willis (January 13, 1942 – March 29, 1982) was an American singer, who performed on many televised variety shows during the 1950s, and later appeared as a guest star in some narrative television series including Maverick with Roger Moore, Wagon Train with Andy Devine, Bourbon Street Beat, The Loretta Young Show and The Andy Griffith Show.

== Early life ==
She was born Marlene Audrey Willis in Levelland, Texas, to Woodrow Wilson Willis, an oilfield worker, and Anna Mae Spangler. She was the third of four children. While still a toddler, her family moved to Fresno, California, where she attended Rowell Elementary School and Yosemite Middle School.

== Child singer ==
Marlene sang impromptu at a picnic concert when just seven years old, and became hooked on the applause. According to a much later newspaper account, Marlene had "a natural ability to echo in perfect pitch any tune or melody she has heard one time". She and her brother Woodie sang for local talent shows in Fresno for several years before she went solo. Fresno performer Al Radka got her a singing gig on radio station KARM AM, which led to her winning a televised talent show in San Francisco in early January 1953. During March 1953 she sang on local TV station KFRE for the Fresno Spring Home Show. She continued to perform for Fresno area events throughout 1953.

Marlene Willis and her family moved from Fresno to North Hollywood in early 1954, where her father took a job as a propman at Paramount. She performed on several musical variety shows that year, including Sandy's Hayride and The Spade Cooley Show. She then took a job as a vocalist with Frank DeVol and his orchestra for another TV show, from which she was signed to a contract by bandleader/producer Hoarce Heidt.

During early 1955 Marlene competed against other singers on The Swift Show Wagon with Hoarce Heidt and the American Way, a roving television program that broadcast each episode from a different state. The show was a mixture of variety acts by well-known entertainers, with a talent competition for amateurs. Like many of its contemporaries, the show used an applause meter to measure live audience reaction for determining contest winners. Unlike them, however, The Swift Show Wagon did not reveal the actual results to the live and TV audiences; instead, a celebrity judge would look at the meters and proclaim the winner. Referring to Marlene's streak of five consecutive wins, a TV critic for The Boston Globe thought Hoarce Heidt would do well to include a little more transparency.

Heidt acknowledged Marlene's professional status by billing her as a featured performer on the following Saturday night's show from Texas. Left unacknowledged was that Heidt had signed her to a contract before she ever competed on The Swift Show Wagon. Heidt had a single by Marlene released by Magnolia Records, Washboard Boogie backed with Mother, Mother, Mother.

For the show's final episode on October 1, 1955, the fiction of being a contestant was again resumed. With the ending of The Swift Show Wagon Marlene returned to singing at local events and supper clubs.

== Teenage career ==
As a teenager Marlene Willis attended the Hollywood Professional School, which offered flexible schedules for young performers. She and schoolmates The Collins Kids landed headliner roles on a teen-oriented variety show called Rockin' Rhythm on KTTV in June 1956. The show was a summer replacement and ended in August 1956. She then continued her live singing performances at venues around the Los Angeles area. During early January 1957 she returned to television with a guest spot on The Bob Crosby Show.

Though she had never taken voice lessons and had previously sung only at live performances, Marlene Willis now signed her first recording contract with Zephyr Records in late February 1957. Zephyr issued only one single with her, which promptly faded away from lack of promotion.

She also signed in May 1957 with Regal Pictures for her first acting job, in a musical film originally titled Mother Was a Stripper but later released as Rockabilly Baby. Filming took place in June, with fifteen year old Marlene Willis recording two songs for the soundtrack, Is It Love? and I'd Rather Be.

Newspapers reported in September 1957 that she had been signed to another recording contract, this time with Verve Records, and to another movie, Attack of the Puppet People for which she was to record four songs. A few days later she was pictured handing in a check for the defense fund of a Louisiana black man, whom a group of fifteen Hollywood producers, directors, and actors felt was wrongfully condemned. That same year she had two more guest singing spots on television shows.

Besides her television spots, Marlene continued singing at live events in spring 1958, drawing energy from the audience's applause. Verve released a single in March with Star Light, Star Bright, which Marlene plugged on another TV show later that month. That summer Verve released a multi-artist LP Songs For Your Boyfriend with Marlene's photo and name dominating the cover, though she had only three tracks on it.

== Later career ==
Following the release of her second film and the Verve album, there was a sudden drop-off in professional engagements for Marlene that lasted well into the fall of 1959. In October 1959 she decided to sign a five-year contract with ERA Records, and also obtained her first TV acting role a month later. Following her eighteenth birthday in January 1960, she began acting in narrative television series on a regular basis. Her first starring role was on an episode of Bourbon Street Beat in June 1960, for which one critic said: "Marlene gets her first starring part here, is a natural, and no longer will have to cavort on the West Coast hoe-down circuit... She is an actress now." Another strong role in 1960 was as the leading lady of an episode of Maverick titled "Flood's Folly" starring Roger Moore as Beau Maverick; she portrayed a ravishing young damsel in distress trapped by her own mother in an enormous former hotel in the middle of the Rockies. She also played a key supporting role in an episode of Wagon Train during season 3 starring Robert Horton, Andy Devine and Glenda Farrell titled "The Jess Macabee Story" in which she portrayed one of five daughters kept isolated on a farm in a secluded valley by her family.

The regular monthly roles on TV series dried up in early 1961, while ERA Records only ever issued two singles by Marlene. By 1964 she had joined the Juan Esquivel Orchestra as a jazz vocalist playing the casino circuit in Nevada, then wound down her career performing at clubs on the Sunset Strip during 1965.

== Personal life ==
According to interviewer Lydia Lane, Willis confirmed she never had a voice lesson, and also said she was bed-ridden with polio for six months as a younger teen. Columnist Paul Coates gave the gist of a press release from her publicity agent describing Marlene at age 17 as standing 5 feet 4 inches tall and weighing 113 pounds, with hazel green eyes.

For most of her career, Marlene's age protected her from gossip columnists. As she reached eighteen, magazines began showing her on "photo-layout" dates with other actors, as was common for publicity of that time period. While still attending Hollywood Professional School, she met and began dating Steve Stevens, then a young actor. Their brief relationship was real, not publicity, but ended when Stevens started associating with mobster Mickey Cohen.

Willis married Kerry Hodges on August 13, 1966, in Los Angeles. He was two years her senior. She died of cancer at age 40 on March 29, 1982.

== Discography ==
Year	Title	Format	Label	Notes
1955	Washboard Boogie	Single	Magnolia Records (MS 1074)	b/w Mother, Mother, Mother
1957	Angel with the Devil in Your Eyes	Single	Zephyr (ZR 70-201)	b/w Graduation Dance
1958	Star Light, Star Bright	Single	Verve (V 10120)	b/w Teen Age Kisses
1959	Songs For Your Boyfriend	Album	Verve (V 2097)	Marlene dominated the cover, but had only three tracks on this multi-artist LP
1960	Billy Barr	Single	ERA Records (3035)	b/w Sticking Pins in a Dolly
1962	Caesar Loves Me	Single	ERA Records (3015)	b/w On A Train Going Nowhere

== Filmography ==
Film (by year of first release)
Year	Title	Role	Notes
1957	Rockabilly Baby	Linda Bennett	She performed two numbers, Is It Love? and I'd Rather Be, then reprised the latter with Les Brown's big band
1958	Attack of the Puppet People	Laurie	Marlene also sang the theme song You're My Living Doll for the soundtrack

Television (in original broadcast order)
Year	Series	Episode	Role	Notes
1953	Unknown	(Talent Contest)	Herself	This was for a San Francisco-based program, the name and details of which are not known
1953	Fresno Spring Home Show	(Variety show)	Herself	This was a multi-evening local program in Fresno on KFRE
1954	Sandy's Hayride	(Variety show)	Herself	Saturday afternoon country variety show on KTTV
1954	The Spade Cooley Show	(Variety show)	Herself	Broadcast from the Venice Pier on KTLA
1955	The Swift Show Wagon	All episodes	Herself	Marlene "won" five straight singing contests then became a featured performer
1956	Rockin' Rhythm	All episodes	Herself	She was billed second on this KTTV local summer replacement show
1957	The Bob Crosby Show	Episode for January 17, 1957	Herself	
1957	Hometown Jamboree	(Country)	Herself	Thirty minute Saturday evening country music show on KTLA created by Cliffie Stone
1957	The Lux Show	(Variety)	Herself	Marlene performed with Frank De Vol and the NBC Orchestra
1958	Strictly Informal	Episode for March 22, 1958	Herself	Thirty minute Saturday evening music show on KTLA created and hosted by Larry Finley
1959	Wagon Train	The Jess MacAbee Story	Sally Belle MacAbee	Season 3 Episode 9 starring Robert Horton, Andy Devine and Glenda Farrell
1960	The Many Loves of Dobie Gillis	Dobie Spreads a Rumor	Malt Shop Girl	
1960	Stop Arthritis Star-A-Thon	(Telethon)	Herself	This was a televised 16-hour broadcast for the benefit of the Arthritis and Rheumatism Foundation
1960	The Loretta Young Show	Second Spring	Donna Rogers	
1960	Wagon Train	The Luke Grant Story	Angie	
1960	Bourbon Street Beat	Reunion	Ellen Landers	
1960	Markham	Counterpoint	Sally	
1960	The Loretta Young Show	The Seducer	Jill Halladay	
1960	The Andy Griffith Show	Stranger in Town	Lucy Matthews	
1961	Maverick	Flood's Folly	Sally Flood	Starring Roger Moore as Beau Maverick
1961	Laramie	Deadly Is the Night	Sue Tolliver	
1963	The Dick Powell Theater	The Rage of Silence	Second Girl	
