= Rockabilly Baby =

1957 film by William F. Claxton

- Theatrical release poster
- Directed by: William F. Claxton
- Screenplay by: Will George; William Driskill
- Produced by: William F. Claxton
- Starring: Virginia Field; Douglas Kennedy; Les Brown; Irene Ryan; Ellen Corby; Judy Busch; Marlene Willis; Gary Vinson
- Cinematography: Walter Strenge
- Edited by: Robert Fritch
- Music by: Paul Dunlap
- Production company: Regal Films
- Distributed by: 20th Century Fox
- Release date: October 30, 1957
- Running time: 81 minutes
- Country: United States
- Language: English

Rockabilly Baby is a 1957 American musical film directed by William F. Claxton and written by William Driskill and William George. The film stars Virginia Field, Douglas Kennedy, Les Brown, Irene Ryan, Ellen Corby, Marlene Willis and Judy Busch.

The film was produced by Robert L. Lippert's Regal Films, and released on October 30, 1957, by 20th Century Fox.

== Cast ==
- Virginia Field as Eleanor Carter aka Dixie West
- Douglas Kennedy as Tom Griffith
- Les Brown as himself
- Irene Ryan as Eunice Johnson
- Ellen Corby as Mrs. Wellington
- Judy Busch as Cathy Carter
- Marlene Willis as Linda Bennett
- Gary Vinson as Jimmy Carter
- Luis Amando as singer
- Frank Sully as Bum
- Gene Roth as Mr. Harry Johnson
- Norman Leavitt as Mr. Fred Rogers
- June Jocelyn as Mrs. Kay Rogers
- Mary Benoit as Mrs. Hoffman
- Hazel Shermet as Mrs. Hill
- Renny McEvoy as Charles Leonard
- Charles Willcox as Chuck Hoffman
- Ken Miller as Ray Hill
- Jimmy Murphy as Bill Haney
- Barry Truex as Pete Rudd
- Sandy Wirth as Jackie

== Production ==
The film was announced under the working title Mother Was a Stripper. Filming took place in June 1957.

== Release ==
The film had its world premiere on September 15, 1957, in Ukiah, California. This was because star Judy Busch was the daughter of Senator Busch from Ukiah.
