= Arlene Howell =

American actress (born 1939)

Arlene (Eurlyne) Howell
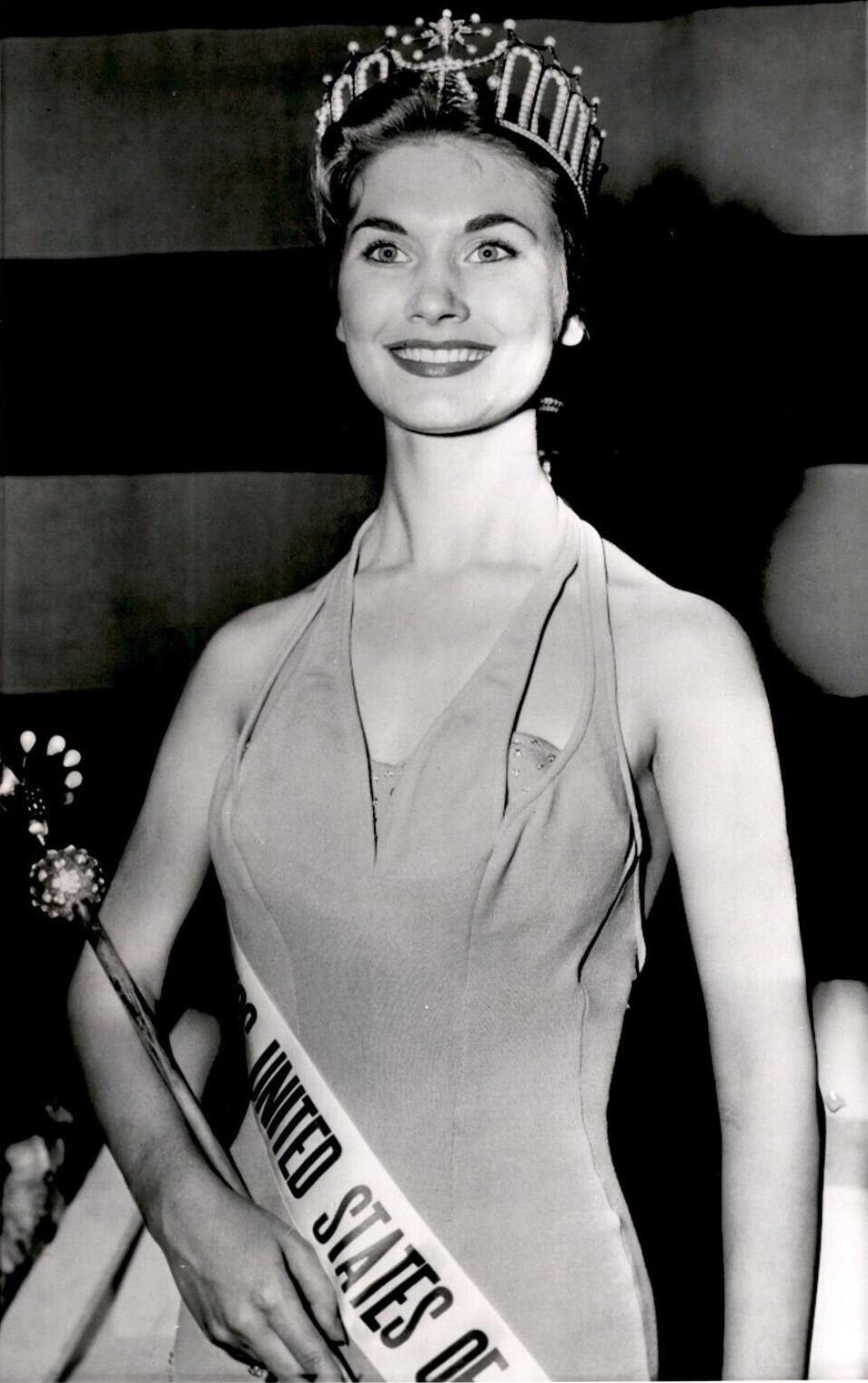
- Howell winning Miss USA 1958
- Born: Arlene Howell; October 26, 1939 (age 86); Delhi, Louisiana, U.S.
- Other name: Eurlyne Howell
- Spouse(s): Paul Michael LaCava (1959–?); Gerald F. Maruschak (1983–)
- Children: 1
- Beauty pageant titleholder
- Title: Miss Louisiana USA 1958
- Major competitions: Miss USA 1958 (winner); Miss Universe 1958 (3rd runner-up)

Arlene Howell (born Eurlyne Howell; October 26, 1939) is an American former actress and beauty pageant titleholder who won the title of Miss USA 1958.

== Early life and education ==
Howell was born in Delhi, Louisiana, the daughter of Mr. and Mrs. E. M. Howell. The family moved to Bossier City, Louisiana, in 1952. She has two sisters. They attended local schools. Howell graduated from Bossier High School, class of 1957, in Bossier City. She studied speech and dramatics at Centenary College of Louisiana.

== Beauty pageant and acting career ==
Howell entered the state level of the Miss USA beauty pageant, hoping to earn some money to support her work in an acting career. After winning Miss Louisiana USA, she became the first of three titleholders from the state to win the Miss USA crown, when she won the Miss USA Pageant in Long Beach, California, in July 1958. That same week, she competed in the Miss Universe Pageant and placed as third runner-up, and is to date the only Miss USA to place third runner-up at Miss Universe.

Howell's television debut occurred September 28, 1958, on Maverick in the episode "Alias Bart Maverick," portraying a semi-regular character named "Cindy Lou Brown" who also appears in "Shady Deal at Sunny Acres" and "Passage to Fort Doom". In 1959, she was cast as secretary "Melody Lee Mercer", a regular supporting role spanning 23 episodes, in the ABC/Warner Brothers crime drama Bourbon Street Beat. The series is set in New Orleans. Studio publicity at the time emphasized Howell's Louisiana roots, but the program was produced in Los Angeles. The show only lasted one season but this was an era in which a single season encompassed 39 episodes (she appeared in 23 of the 39 according to her Internet Movie Database [imdb.com] article).

Howell played "Cindy Lou Brown" in three episodes of Maverick and appeared once as a character named "Ladybird Forge" in an episode titled "Island in the Swamp" with James Garner and Edgar Buchanan. She was cast in 77 Sunset Strip (episode: "A Nice Social Evening"), Bronco (episode: "Prairie Skipper"), Alcoa Premiere (episode: "What Ever Happened to Miss Illinois?"), Bachelor Father (episode: "Ginger's Big Romance"), and played "Flora" in a 1966 episode of Gomer Pyle, U.S.M.C. in which she was the best friend of a blind date for an understandably flabbergasted Sgt. Carter. Howell ended her career at that point.

== Personal life ==
Howell married pilot Paul LaCava in August 1959. They had one child, a girl named Lisa.
