= Miss USA 1958 =

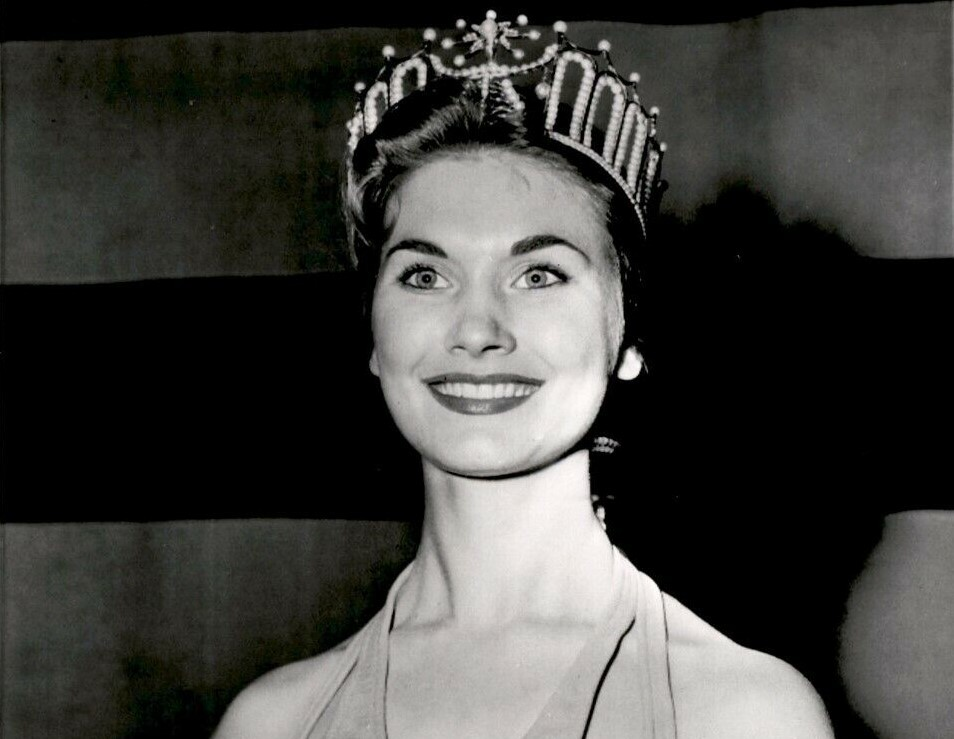
- Eurlyne Howell, Miss USA 1958
- Date: July 23, 1958
- Venue: Long Beach, California
- Entrants: 45
- Placements: 15
- Withdrawals: Kansas; Mississippi; Oklahoma; Oregon; Wisconsin
- Winner: Eurlyne Howell; Louisiana

Miss USA 1958 was the seventh Miss USA pageant, held at Long Beach Municipal Auditorium, Long Beach, California on July 23, 1958.

At the end of the event, Charlotte Sheffield of Utah crowned Eurlyne Howell of Louisiana as Miss USA 1958. It is the first victory of Louisiana in the pageant's history. Howell later competed at Miss Universe and was named as third runner-up to eventual winner, Luz Marina Zuluaga.

Contestants from 45 states and cities competed in this year's pageant. The competition was hosted by Bob Russell.

== Results ==
=== Placements ===
Placement	Contestant
Miss USA 1958	Louisiana – Eurlyne Howell
1st runner-up	Florida – Marcia Valibus
2nd runner-up	Alabama – Judith Carlson
3rd runner-up	Illinois – June Pickney
4th runner-up	Georgia – Diane Austin
Top 15	California – Donna Brooks; Montana – Sharon Tietjen; Nebraska – Dee Kjeldgaard; New York – Virginia Fox; South Carolina – Patricia Moss; South Dakota – Helen Youngquist; Tennessee – Martha Boales; Texas – Linda Daugherty; Utah – Sandra Pugh; Washington – Rose Nielsen

== Pageant ==
=== Selection committee ===
- Vincent Trotta – American artist
- Miyoko Nayagita – Member of the Woman Artists Association
- Roger Zeiler – French official from the Miss Europe Committee
- Jacob Gaudaur – Canadian oarsman
- Ma Ma Loa – Famous Hawaiian singer
- Earl Wilson – American journalist and columnist
- David Arasik – Israeli editor of Cinema magazine
- Alberto Vargas – Peruvian-American painter known for his "Vargas Girls"
- Raul Ferrada – Chilean newspaper editor

== Contestants ==
45 contestants competed for the title.

State/City	Contestant	Age (Note: Ages at the time of the pageant)	Hometown	Notes
Alabama	Judith Lucille Carlson	18	Birmingham	
Arizona	Shirlee Fox	20	Phoenix	
Arkansas	Nancy Hill	19	Little Rock	
California	Donna Kay Brooks	18	Los Angeles	
Colorado	Devona Hubka	18	Denver	
Connecticut	Dorothy E. Dillen	19	Hartford	
Delaware	Virginia Marie Jefferson	18	Delmar	
District of Columbia	Peggy Wolf	–	Washington, D.C.	
Florida	Marcia Valibus	20	Miami Beach	Competed in the 1958 Miss Dixie Pageant
Georgia	Diane Gail Austin	18	Atlanta	
Idaho	Jeanette Ashton	18	Inkom	
Illinois	June Pickney	22	Chicago	
Indiana	Shirley Ann Ball	19	Indianapolis	
Iowa	Sandra Mary Olsen	18	Sioux City	
Kentucky	Shannon Beasley	20	Reed	
Louisiana	Eurlyne Howell	18	Bossier City	3rd runner-up at Miss Universe 1958
Maine	Karen Louise Hansen	19	Cumberland Center	
Maryland	Patricia Marie Vogts	22	Silver Spring	
Massachusetts	Sally Ann Freedman	18	Peabody	
Michigan	Shirley Ann Black	19	Flint	
Minnesota	Sue Bouchard	19	Minneapolis	
Missouri	Beverly Sue Wright	19	St. Louis	
Montana	Sharon Diane Tietjen	18	Great Falls	Later Miss Montana 1959
Nebraska	Dee Kjeldgaard	21	Big Springs	
Nevada	Terry Lee Jeffers	18	Las Vegas	
New Hampshire	Patricia Gail Larrabee	19	Salem	
New Jersey	Fay Hasenauer	–	Menlo Park Terrace	
New Mexico	Sandi Lin Bullis	18	Albuquerque	
New York	Virginia Fox	–	New York City	
North Carolina	Carol Jean Edwards	18	Elizabeth City	
North Dakota	Diana Spidahl	–	–	
Ohio	Cindy Ann Garrison	18	Canton	
Pennsylvania	Natalie Dee	22	Philadelphia	
Philadelphia, Pennsylvania	Kathleen Conyers	19	Haverton	
Rhode Island	Claire di Paolo	20	Providence	
South Carolina	Patricia Ann Moss	18	York	
South Dakota	Helen Youngquist	20	Sioux Falls	
Tennessee	Martha Nelle "Marty" Boales	19	Memphis	1st runner-up in the 1959 Miss Dixie Pageant
Texas	Linda Ann Daugherty	18	Houston	
Utah	Sandra Pugh	19	Provo	
Vermont	Doreen Patricia McNamee	20	Brattleboro	
Virginia	Betty Marsh	18	Lynchburg	
Washington	Rose Marie Nielsen	19	Seattle	
West Virginia	Mary Ann Guthrie	19	Charleston	
Wyoming	Dorothy Kochiras	–	Evanston	
