= Tol Avery =

American actor (1915–1973)

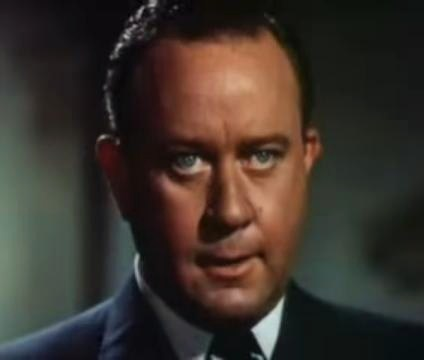
- Tol Avery in The Unholy Wife (1957)
- Born: Taliaferro Ware Avery; August 28, 1915; Fort Worth, Texas, US
- Died: August 27, 1973 (aged 57)
- Occupation: Actor
- Years active: 1950–1973
- Spouse: Yvonne Tanchuck (m. 1968, divorced)

Taliaferro Ware "Tol" Avery (August 28, 1915 – August 27, 1973) was an American film and television character actor who appeared in more than 100 separate works between 1950 and 1974.

== Biography ==
Early in his career, Avery portrayed Lieutenant Steve King on The Thin Man.

Noted for his girth and cultured voice, Avery usually played sophisticated and articulate villains, including the featured nemesis in six out of seven episode appearances on the ABC/Warner Brothers western television series Maverick starring James Garner, Jack Kelly and Roger Moore between 1957 and 1962. The episodes were "According to Hoyle" with Garner and Diane Brewster, "Rope of Cards" with Garner, "Yellow River" with Kelly, "Maverick Springs" with Garner and Kelly as well as Kathleen Crowley, "Last Wire from Stop Gap" with Kelly and Moore (in which Avery does not play a villain), "Maverick at Law" with Kelly, and "Poker Face" with Kelly. In 1958, he appeared in the episode "Devil to Pay" of the ABC/WB series Sugarfoot.

Avery was cast twice during this time in another ABC/WB western series, Colt .45, starring Wayde Preston. Avery played the role of Archer Belgrade in "Circle of Fear" (1958) and Barnes in "Queen of Dixie" (1959). In the latter episode, he was cast with Andy Clyde in the role of Captain Gibbs. In 1960, he was cast as Theodore and John Nichols, respectively, in the episodes "Key to the City" and "False Identity" of the ABC/WB crime drama, Bourbon Street Beat starring Andrew Duggan, Richard Long and Van Williams. He also guest starred on the CBS sitcom, Pete and Gladys with Harry Morgan and Cara Williams.

As one of several appearances in different roles on CBS's The Andy Griffith Show, Avery in 1964 played Ben Weaver in the episode "The Shoplifters." That same year, he was cast as "Speaker Bert Metcalf" on the CBS drama series Slattery's People, starring Richard Crenna. He appeared five times during the 1960s on the long running NBC western series The Virginian.

In 1965 he appeared on Gomer Pyle, U.S.M.C. in Season 2 Episode 13 as Mr. Gibbons and in 1967 on Season 4 Episode 10 as Mr. Poovie.

In 1966, Avery appeared three times on the syndicated western anthology series, Death Valley Days, as Frank Brenner in "The Resurrection of Deadwood Dick" and as Walter Benson in "Doc Holliday's Gold Bars" (both 1966), and as judge Sidney Edgerton, who later becomes the first governor of the Montana Territory, in the segment "Lucia Darling and the Ostrich" (1969).

Avery also appeared three times each on ABC's Batman (episodes 25, 26 and 87) and CBS's Mannix, once on ABC's Rango in 1967, and on Dragnet in 1968 as Willard Danhart. One of his last appearances was as Justice Redding in the 1973 TV-movie The Marcus-Nelson Murders, which served as the pilot for the CBS detective series Kojak, starring Telly Savalas.

Avery received a real estate license at about the same as he won his role in Slattery's People. He continued his sales job, working in real estate on weekends.

== Death ==
Avery died of a heart attack, a day before his 58th birthday, on August 27, 1973.

== Partial filmography ==
- Bunco Squad (1950) – Capt. Edwards (uncredited)
- Where Danger Lives (1950) – Honest Ha (uncredited)
- Gambling House (1950) – Adams (uncredited)
- No Questions Asked (1951) – Detective Mike (uncredited)
- His Kind of Woman (1951) – Fat Hoodlum (uncredited)
- Scarlet Angel (1952) – Phineas Calhoun
- She Couldn't Say No (1954) – Big Guy (uncredited)
- Naked Alibi (1954) – Irish
- It Came from Beneath the Sea (1955) – Navy Intern (uncredited)
- All That Heaven Allows (1955) – Tom Allenby
- Headline Hunters (1955) – Robert, Evening Examiner Man (uncredited)
- I'll Cry Tomorrow (1955) – Fat Man
- Back from Eternity (1956) – Thomas J. Malone (uncredited)
- The Power and the Prize (1956) – Dan Slocum (uncredited)
- The Unholy Wife (1957) – Dist. Atty. Carl Kramer
- Pal Joey (1957) – Detective (uncredited)
- The Case Against Brooklyn (1958) – Dist. Atty. Michael W. Norris
- Buchanan Rides Alone (1958) – Judge Simon Agry
- North by Northwest (1959) – State Police Detective (uncredited)
- This Rebel Breed (1960) – Dr. Drake (uncredited)
- Man-Trap (1961) – Lt. Heisen
- The George Raft Story (1961) – Wilson Mizner, the Wit (uncredited)
- Twist Around the Clock (1961) – Joe Marshall
- A Ticklish Affair (1963) – Charlie (uncredited)
- A Tiger Walks (1964) – Joe, Political Adviser (uncredited)
- The Satan Bug (1965) – Police Captain at Dodger Stadium (uncredited)
- Follow Me, Boys! (1966) – Dr. Ferris (uncredited)
- Hotel (1967) – Kilbrick
- Where It's At (1969) – Businessman (uncredited)
- A Dream of Kings (1969) – Herman
- WUSA (1970) – Senator
- R. P. M. (1970) – 2nd Parent at Police Station (uncredited)
- The Strange Monster of Strawberry Cove (1971) – Man at the Parents Meeting
- Maurie (1973) – Milton
- Willie Dynamite (1974) – Business International Association Television Speaker (uncredited) (final film role)
