= Gage Clarke =

American actor (1900–1964)

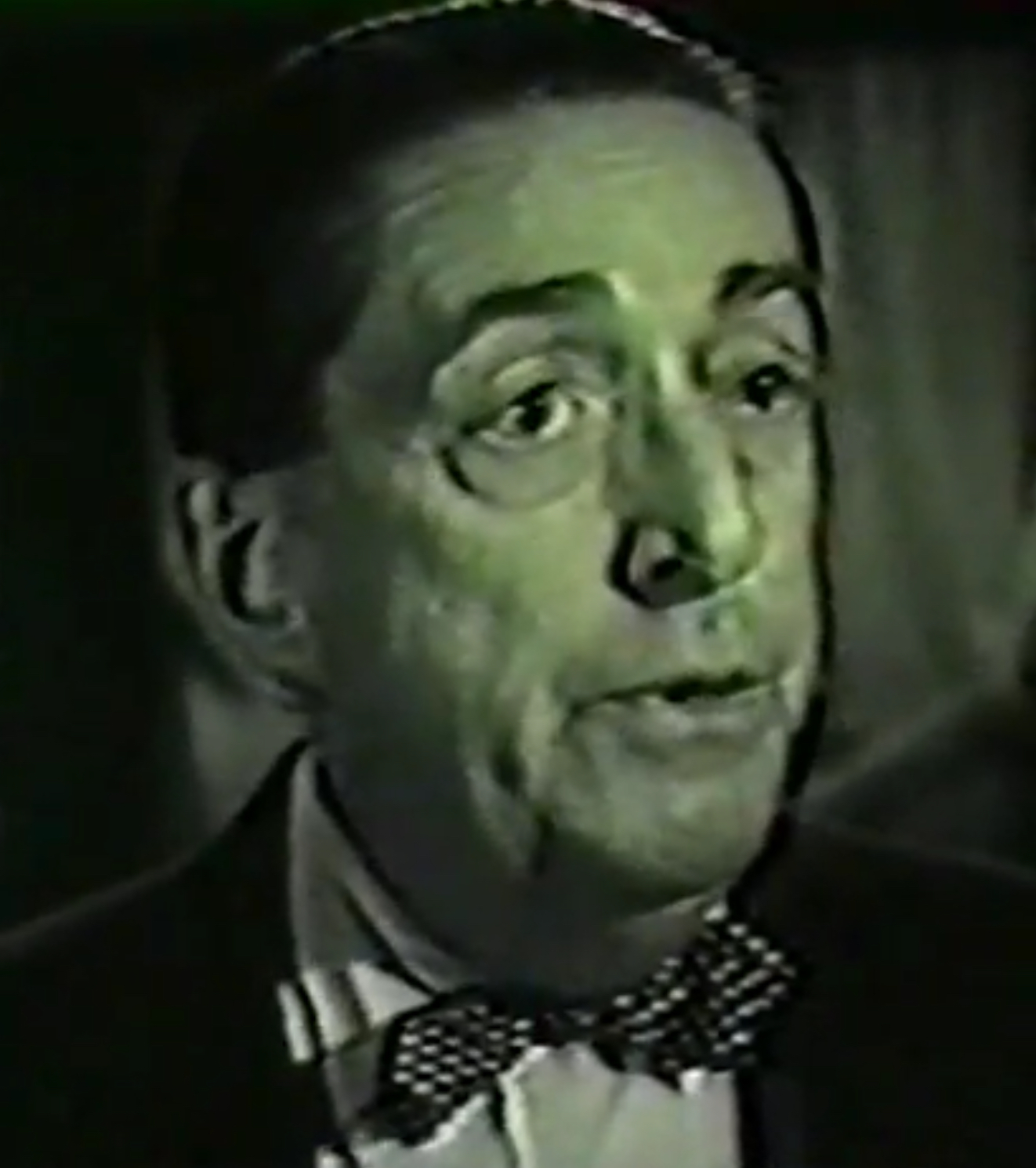
- Clarke in an episode of Lock-Up (1961)
- Born: Gage Ellis Clarke; March 3, 1900; Vassar, Michigan; U.S.
- Died: October 23, 1964 (aged 64); Woodland Hills, California; U.S.
- Resting place: Riverside Cemetery, Vassar, Michigan
- Other name: Gage Clark
- Occupation: Actor
- Years active: 1929–1964

Gage Clarke (also credited as Gage Clark; March 3, 1900 – October 23, 1964) was an American stage, television, and film character actor. The first half of his career was dedicated to the theatre, predominantly to Broadway productions, while television and film roles dominated his work during the latter half of his career. Among his memorable television roles is his portrayal of the fastidious school official "Mr. Bascomb" during the 1952–1953 broadcast season of the sitcom Mister Peepers starring Wally Cox. Clarke also performed in many other television series produced between 1949 and the early 1960s, most prominently Maverick and Gunsmoke, as well as in more than a dozen Hollywood features.

== Early life ==
Born in Vassar, Michigan in 1900, Gage was the only child of Metta L. (née Gage) and George D. Clarke, who worked as a bookkeeper and later as a bank cashier in the town of Vassar. Gage in September 1918 registered with the United States military draft in his hometown, but World War I ended before he could enter service. Two years later, in January 1920, the federal census shows that Gage was not employed and was still living with his parents in Vassar; but by 1929 he had relocated to New York City, where he was performing in major Broadway productions.

== Stage ==
In November and December 1929, Clarke portrayed Geoffry in the Broadway production of A Ledge presented at the Assembly Theatre. He then had parts in the 1931 plays The Venetian Glass Nephew and Devil in the Mind. The next year he had a significant role in The Inside Story, directed by A. H. Van Buren at the National Theatre, and in 1933-1934 he played Buck Buckner in Jezebel starring Miriam Hopkins at the Ethel Barrymore Theatre. In his review of Jezebel at the time, Abel Green of the trade paper Variety is critical of the play's script, but he commends the cast's performances and includes Clarke among the production's "outstanders". Clarke for the remainder of the 1930s continued to act in a variety of other Broadway productions such as Lost Horizons, Parnell, Many Mansions, The Monocled Man, Tomorrow's a Holiday, Escape This Night, Summer Night, Great Lady, and I Know What I Like. In the 1937 play Many Mansions—described as a "dignified invective against the church"—Clarke again received very favorable reviews for his central role as Reverend Roger Crandall.

When the United States entered World War II, Clarke was 41 years old, still eligible for induction into military service. He therefore joined the U.S. Army in 1942 and served in the Transportation Corps as a private in Company B of the 487th Port Battalion, which was initially deployed to Europe to supply troops for the allied invasion of France in 1944. After the war he resumed his acting career, although in the late 1940s he began to focus increasingly on obtaining roles in the new, rapidly expanding medium of commercial television. Yet, Clarke continued to return periodically to the stage. In 1950 and 1951, for example, he performed again on Broadway in the role of Dr. Gagnon in The Happy Time at the Plymouth Theatre. In its review of that play's opening night, Variety yet again highlights his performance, reporting that "Gage Clarke is expertly comic as a querulous, disheveled sawbones".

== Television ==
Clarke's earliest credited television roles date from 1949, when he performed in the sitcom The Hartmans, in the pilot episode "Goodbye New York" for the anthology series Suspense, and in six installments of Kraft Television Theatre. Over the next 15 years he was cast as a supporting player in dozens of other series and often multiple times on episodes of some of the most popular television shows of the 1950s and early 1960s. A few of those series are Mister Peepers with Wally Cox, Lux Video Theatre, The Real McCoys with Walter Brennan, The Twilight Zone episode "One More Pallbearer", Alfred Hitchcock Presents and the Perry Mason episode "The Case of the Glittering Goldfish".

Arguably his most prominent role was in the comedic episode of Maverick titled "Greenbacks Unlimited," in which he shares extremely extensive screen time as timid gambler Foursquare Farley with James Garner and John Dehner, one of seven appearances playing different characters in that series, including "Rage for Vengeance", "Gun-Shy" and "Cruise of the Cynthia B" with Garner as Bret Maverick and "Maverick at Law", "Dade City Dodge" and "One of Our Trains is Missing" with Jack Kelly as Bart Maverick. "Gun-Shy" was a spoof of the long-running Western television series Gunsmoke, on which Clarke performed as various characters in a dozen episodes between 1956 and 1963, although most often in the recurring roles of Dodge City's hotel clerk Mr. Dobie and the town's bank manager Mr. Botkin.

By the end of 1963, Clarke began to curtail his work as his health declined. His final television performance is on another Western series, Destry with John Gavin, in the 1964 episode "The Last Girl from Gemmorah", which aired on ABC seven months before Clarke's untimely death.

== Film ==
Clarke's work in films began relatively late in his acting career, so his credits on the "big screen" are not as extensive as those for his performances in the theatre or on television. His first notable film roles are 1956 releases, both psychological thrillers: Nightmare with Edward G. Robinson in which Clarke plays the villain and The Bad Seed with Nancy Kelly featuring Clarke's portrayal of Reginald Tasker, a mystery writer and amateur criminologist. In his final film, The Monkey's Uncle with Annette Funicello, he portrays another school official, a college president. That Walt Disney production was released nationally in August 1965, ten months after Clarke's death.

== Personal life and death ==
Clarke never married. On October 23, 1964, he died of lung cancer at the Motion Picture Country Hospital in Woodland Hills, California at the age of 64. His obituaries report that he had "no immediate survivors". His gravesite is at the same cemetery where his parents are buried, at Riverside Cemetery in Vassar, Michigan.

== Filmography ==
Year	Title	Role	Notes
1956	Alfred Hitchcock Presents	Sidney Gainsborough	Season 1 Episode 29: "The Orderly World of Mr. Appelby"
1956	Nightmare	Louis Belnap / Harry Britton	
1956	The Bad Seed	"Reggie" Tasker	
1957	Fury at Showdown	Chad Deasy	
1957	Valerie	Jonathan Griggs	
1957	The Invisible Boy	Dr. Bannerman	
1958	The Brothers Karamazov	Defense counsel	
1958	The Return of Dracula	Reverend Doctor Whitfield	
1958	I Want to Live!	Attorney Richard G. Tibrow	
1959	Alfred Hitchcock Presents	Doctor	Season 4 Episode 26: "Cheap is Cheap"
1960	Pollyanna	Mr. Cory Murg	
1960	Midnight Lace	Salesman in gun shop	Uncredited
1961	Alfred Hitchcock Presents	Dr. Emmet Vogel	Season 7 Episode 11: "The Right Kind of Medicine"
1961	The Great Impostor	Mr. Warren	Uncredited
1961	The Absent Minded Professor	Reverend Bosworth	
1962	Alfred Hitchcock Presents	Frisbee	Season 7 Episode 34: "The Twelve Hour Caper"
1965	The Monkey's Uncle	College president	(final film role, released posthumously, 18/8/'65).
