= Robert Colbert =

American actor (born 1931)

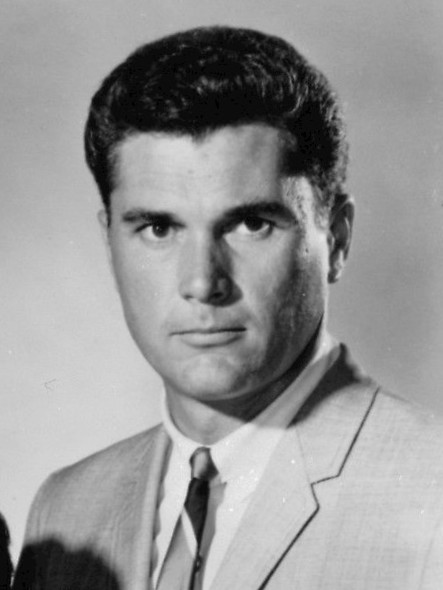
- Colbert in 1966
- Born: Robert Louis Colbert; July 26, 1931 (age 95); Long Beach, California, U.S.
- Years active: 1957–1995
- Known for: The Time Tunnel; The Young and the Restless
- Spouses: Dotty Harmony (m. 1961; div. 1976) (m. 2022; died 2023)
- Children: 2

Robert Louis Colbert (born July 26, 1931) is an American retired actor best known for his leading role as Dr. Doug Phillips on the ABC television series The Time Tunnel and his two appearances as Brent Maverick, a third Maverick brother in the ABC/Warner Brothers western Maverick.

== Early years ==
Robert Louis Colbert was born in Long Beach, California, on July 26, 1931, the son of Helena (née Gorman) and Clarence Colbert. He began acting when he was a soldier based on the Japanese island of Okinawa. He was a clerk typist with a Military Police unit and also worked as a disc jockey for radio station KSBK in the evenings. A woman in Air Force Special Services heard his voice and recruited him to act in a performance of The Caine Mutiny Court-Martial. He gained acting experience with the Portland (Oregon) Repertory Theater.

== Film and television career ==
=== Warner Bros. and Maverick ===
Colbert appeared in a number of minor films, including Have Rocket, Will Travel with the Three Stooges. He was signed to a contract with Warner Bros. and subsequently cast in the feature film A Fever in the Blood (1961) with Jack Kelly and Efrem Zimbalist Jr., along with many guest appearances on Warner Brothers Television series.

In 1960, he appeared in three episodes of the ABC/WB western, Colt .45 with Wayde Preston, including the episode "Showdown at Goldtown". Colbert plays Johnny Moore, a young ex-convict. Colbert also appeared as Bill Mannix in another 1960 Colt .45 episode, "Strange Encounter."

On October 28, 1960, Colbert was cast as Army Corporal Howie Burch in the episode "Two Trails to Santa Fe" of the ABC/WB western series Cheyenne starring Clint Walker.

==== Brent Maverick ====
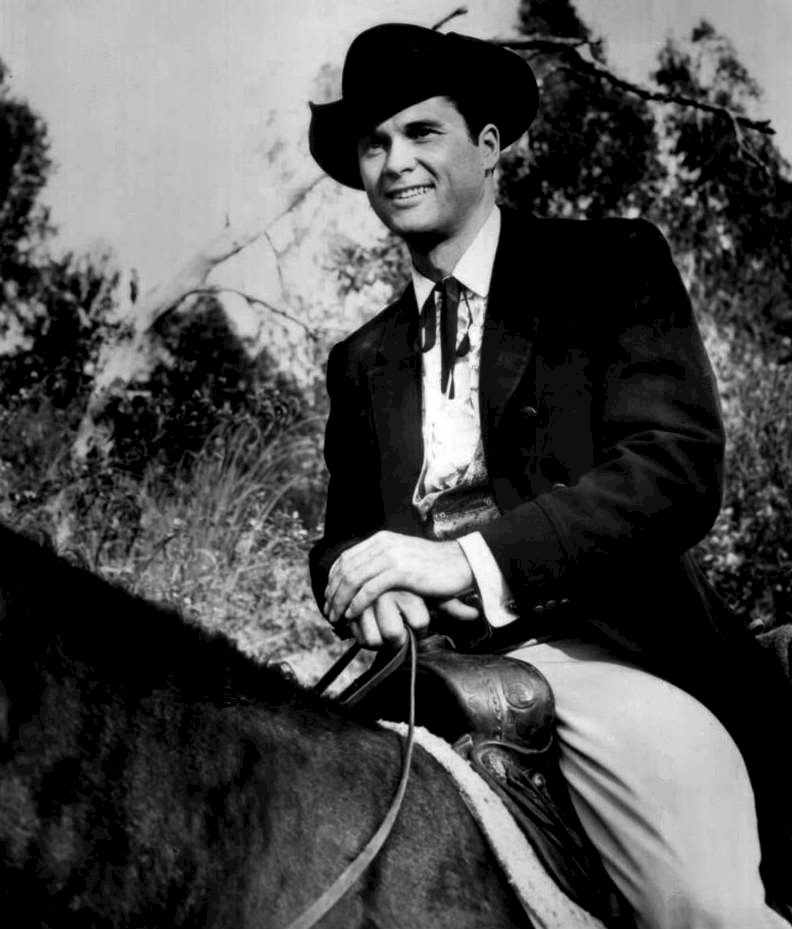
Colbert as Brent Maverick in Maverick (1961)

Colbert's first appearance in Maverick was in the fourth season, in "Hadley's Hunters," playing a character called "Cherokee" Dan Evans, an episode featuring many cameos by the lead actors in other Warner Bros. Western series playing their usual roles: Will Hutchins as Sugarfoot, Ty Hardin as Bronco, Clint Walker as Cheyenne, and John Russell and Peter Brown from Lawman. Colbert wore a black hat on the back of his head during the episode, the way James Garner's character had in earlier seasons (Garner and Colbert resembled each other extremely closely). Later that same season, in 1961, Colbert was forced by Warner Bros. to wear the whole costume, dressed exactly as look-alike Garner had in Garner's earlier role of Bret Maverick to play a new series regular called Brent Maverick. Thinking of the inevitable comparisons to Garner that were bound to ensue, Colbert said to his bosses, "Put me in a dress and call me Brenda, but don't do this to me!" Garner had been a huge success in the role and was in the process of moving into a much-anticipated theatrical movie career in the wake of winning a contentious lawsuit with Warner Bros. Colbert played his part in two episodes and was not called back for the following season since the studio, facing a steep ratings decline after the departures of writer/producer Roy Huggins and star Garner, agreed to alternate new episodes featuring only Bret and Brent's brother Bart Maverick (Jack Kelly) with reruns from earlier seasons starring Garner during the series' fifth and final season. Colbert, whose only two episodes as Brent Maverick were "The Forbidden City" and "Benefit of Doubt," had never received enough screen time to see if he could have eventually succeeded in bolstering the ratings.

Before Roger Moore, who played Bart's cousin Beau Maverick, left Maverick during the same season in which Colbert appeared, the studio shot numerous publicity photographs of Colbert, Kelly and Moore cavorting in costume together that are readily accessible on Google Images; the rights to many of the pictures are currently owned by Getty Images. By the time Colbert's two episodes were telecast, however, Moore had already quit the show and Moore and Colbert never appeared together in the series itself. James Garner reminisced in his Archive of American Television interview that the studio lit Colbert darkly as well as dressing him like Garner in an attempt to mislead the public that Garner had returned but that when Colbert spoke, the audience realized that it wasn't Garner. A viewing of the episodes themselves, however, reveals that Garner was mistaken about this and that Colbert was lit normally during his shows although he was certainly dressed precisely as Garner had been earlier in the series.

In 1962, Colbert appeared as Miles Kroeger on the TV western The Virginian on the episode titled "Impasse." In 1962, Colbert played Lonzo Green in the episode "Footlights" of the ABC/WB crime drama, The Roaring 20s. Moreover, he guest starred on most of the ABC/WB series, including 77 Sunset Strip and Hawaiian Eye (seven times each), Bronco (six times), Bourbon Street Beat (three times), Sugarfoot, The Alaskans with Roger Moore, 12 O’Clock High, and Surfside 6 (twice each), and Cheyenne and Lawman, once each.

Due to a business issue resulting from a restaurant investment, Colbert requested that Warner Bros. Television head Bill Orr release him from his Warners contract.

=== Post-Warner Bros. ===
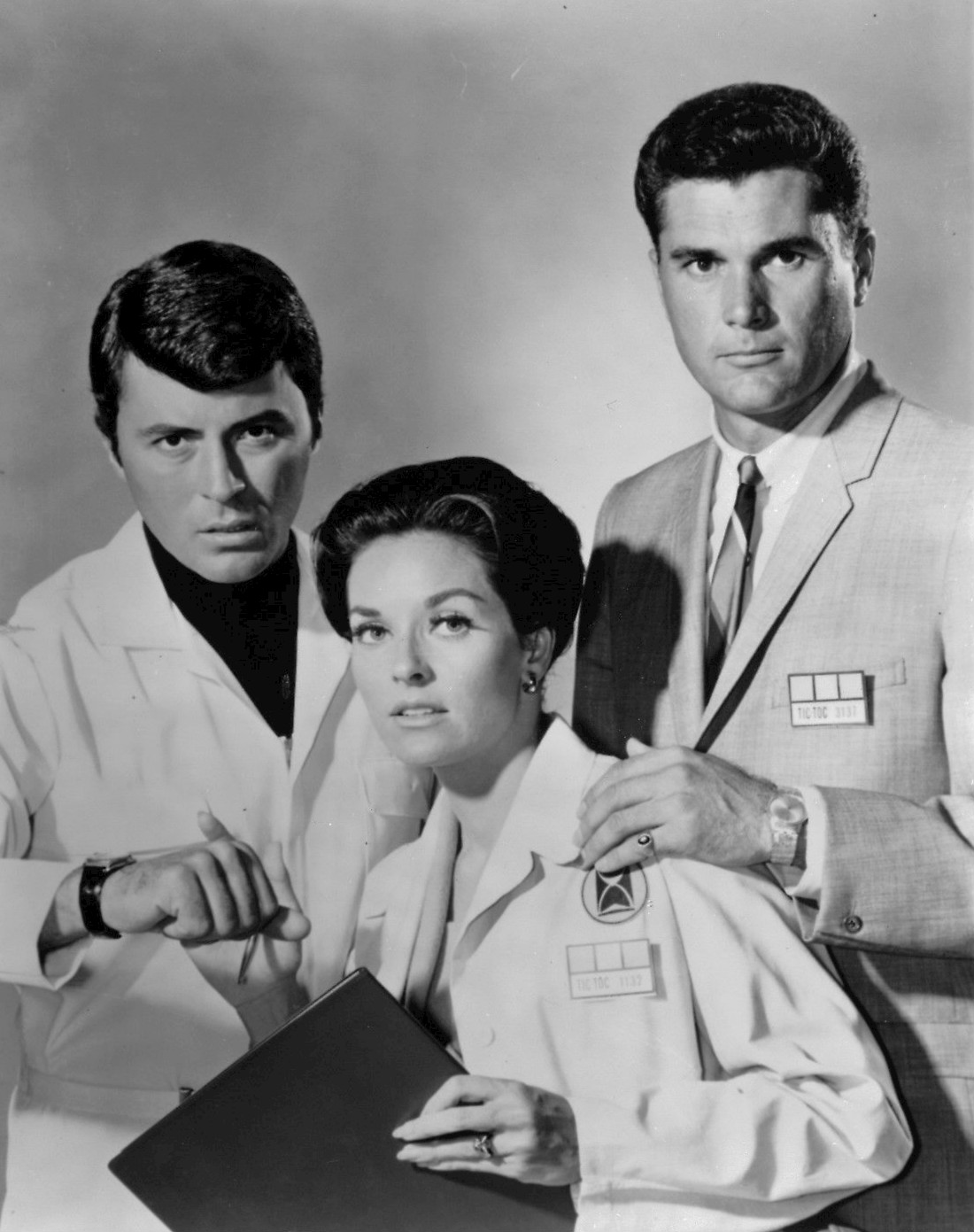
James Darren, Lee Meriwether, and Robert Colbert in The Time Tunnel

Throughout the early 1960s Colbert guest-starred in a variety of popular television series including a trip back to Warner Bros. to appear in a 1964 episode of 77 Sunset Strip. He was also cast as Andy Carter, a pioneer who retrieves for sale cast-off items from wagon trains in the 1964 episode "A Bargain Is for Keeping" of the syndicated television anthology series Death Valley Days (hosted by future President Ronald Reagan). Colbert made an unsuccessful 1964 television pilot for MGM Television playing the title role of the Mayor. In 1965, he made two guest appearances on Perry Mason as Deputy District Attorney Snell—first in "The Case of the Grinning Gorilla", then in "The Case of the Hasty Honeymooner".

That same year, Colbert guest-starred in an episode of Bonanza, "The Meredith Smith", in which he appeared dressed almost exactly as he had as Brent Maverick only in full color with a bright blue hatband. In the episode he portrays a man called Ace Jones, who claims to be Meredith Smith, the heir of a large estate.

Colbert's agent arranged a meeting with Irwin Allen. In 1966–1967, Colbert played the part of Doug Phillips in thirty episodes of the Irwin Allen science fiction ABC series The Time Tunnel, the second lead in a show about two time travelers. James Darren and Lee Meriwether starred with Colbert. Historical events like the Alamo, the sinking of the Titanic, the volcanic eruption on Krakatoa, and Custer's Last Stand were fictionalized. Colbert later starred in an unsuccessful 1970 television pilot for Allen entitled City Beneath the Sea that was shown as a made-for-TV movie.

In 1968, Colbert appeared in the final episode of the first season of Hawaii Five-O. In 1969, he was a guest star in an episode of Mannix, "Who Is Sylvia" (season 3, episode 19), where he played an old friend of Mannix, Phil, whose wife is the victim of several murder attempts. He was also a guest star in another episode of Mannix, "Duet for Three" (season 4, episode 13), playing Vic Stanley, whose friend Mart commits suicide in Hong Kong. Also in 1969, Colbert appeared in an episode of That Girl, "Fly Me To The Moon" (season 3, episode 23), as Air Force Reserve Major Brian James. Colbert also appeared as the character Stuart Brooks on the television soap opera The Young and the Restless from March 1973 to March 1983, being honored at the show's tenth anniversary.

In 1971, Colbert guest-starred again on Mannix in the episode "A Choice of Evils" as spy John Phillips. He made another guest appearance on Mannix in 1972, in the episode "A Walk in the Shadows" as scheming businessman Carl Blake. In 1973, he made a brief appearance in the Mannix episode, "Little Girl Lost" (season 7, episode 4), where he appeared as the victim of a murder. In 1987, he appeared in the film parody Amazon Women on the Moon.

== Personal life ==
In 1961, Colbert married dancer/songwriter Dorothy Marian "Dotty" Harmony (1933–2023). They were married for 15 years, remarrying again many years later in 2022. Harmony wrote for Metric Music with Sharon Sheeley and had songs recorded by Rick Nelson. They have two children, Cami and Clay. Cami was married to filmmaker Jon Freeman (Flesh Wound Films), and produced the highly successful "Crusty Demon" series of DVDs.

Colbert is retired, though he still makes occasional cameo appearances, takes part in science fiction conventions and Western conventions all across America, and participates in celebrity golf tournaments for fundraising events.
