= Bourbon Street Beat =

1959 American TV detective series

- Created by: Charles Hoffman
- Starring: Richard Long; Andrew Duggan; Arlene Howell; Van Williams
- Theme music composer: Mack David and Jerry Livingston
- Composers: Jack Halloran, arranger Michael Heindorf; Howard Jackson; Frank Perkins; Paul Sawtell; Bert Shefter
- Country of origin: United States
- Original language: English
- No. of seasons: 1
- No. of episodes: 39

Production
- Executive producer: William T. Orr
- Producers: Charles Hoffman; Harry Tatelman; Jerry Davis; Oren W. Haglund (Production manager); Gordon Bau (make-up)
- Production location: California
- Editor: James C. Moore
- Running time: 60 minutes
- Production company: Warner Bros. Television Division

Original release
- Network: ABC
- Release: October 5, 1959 – July 4, 1960

Related
- Surfside 6; 77 Sunset Strip; Hawaiian Eye

Bourbon Street Beat is a private detective television series that aired on the ABC network from October 5, 1959, to July 4, 1960, starring Richard Long as Rex Randolph and Andrew Duggan as Cal Calhoun, with Arlene Howell as detective agency secretary Melody Lee Mercer and Van Williams as Kenny Madison. Reruns continued until September 26, 1960.

Randolph and Calhoun — Special Services was based in the Absinthe House, a nightclub on the title street in the French Quarter of New Orleans. The firm's telephone number was EXpress 7123. The show's theme, "Bourbon Street Beat", was composed by Mack David and Jerry Livingston.

== Characters ==
Calhoun and Randolph were co-owners of the detective agency Randolph and Calhoun, Special Services. Melody Lee Mercer was their receptionist, and Kenny Madison was an assistant to the owners. The Baron played piano in the city.

== Cast ==
Main Cast: Andrew Duggan, Arlene Howell, Van Williams and Richard Long in Bourbon Street Beat

Richard Long as Rex Randolph
Andrew Duggan as Cal Calhoun
Arlene Howell as Melody Lee Mercer
Van Williams as Kenny Madison
Eddie Cole as The Baron (twelve episodes)
Tommy Farrell as Jay O'Hanlon (seven episodes)
James Chandler as Lt. Gerard (four episodes)
Nita Talbot as Lusti Weather (four episodes)

== Guest stars ==
The following are among the many guest stars on the single season of Bourbon Street Beat:

- Charles Aidman
- Robert Anderson
- Roscoe Ates
- Tol Avery
- Raymond Bailey
- Don "Red" Barry
- Jeanne Bates
- Roxane Berard
- Whit Bissell
- Lane Bradford
- Henry Brandon
- Victor Buono
- Walter Burke
- Jean Byron
- James T. Callahan
- Richard Chamberlain
- James Coburn
- Robert Colbert
- Tris Coffin
- Gary Conway
- Russ Conway
- Kathleen Crowley
- Michael Dante
- Ray Danton
- Richard Deacon
- Cyril Delevanti
- Brad Dexter
- Ann Doran
- James Drury
- Bill Erwin
- James Flavin
- Kathleen Freeman
- Lisa Gaye
- Virginia Gregg
- Myron Healey
- John Hoyt
- Brad Johnson
- Warren J. Kemmerling
- Shirley Knight
- Ted Knight
- Gail Kobe
- Sandy Koufax
- Lou Krugman
- Nancy Kulp
- Sue Anne Langdon
- Suzanne Lloyd
- John Marley
- Joel Marston
- Diane McBain
- John McKee
- Patrick McVey
- Tyler McVey
- Joanna Moore
- Mary Tyler Moore
- Rita Moreno
- Jeanette Nolan
- Jay Novello
- Cynthia Pepper
- Paul Picerni
- Mala Powers
- Judson Pratt
- Denver Pyle
- Mike Ragan
- Rex Reason
- Rhodes Reason
- Madlyn Rhue
- Carlos Romero
- Richard Rust
- Karen Steele
- Randy Stuart
- Vaughn Taylor
- Mary Treen
- Lurene Tuttle
- Adam West
- Peter Whitney
- Robert J. Wilke
- Marie Windsor
- Donald Woods
- Carleton G. Young
- Tony Young

== Episodes ==
No.	Title	Directed by	Written by	Original release date
1	"The Taste of Ashes"	Leslie H. Martinson	Story by : Howard Browne, Teleplay by : Charles Hoffman & Al C. Ward	October 5, 1959
Rex Randolph discovers his partner has died, the police dismiss the case as a simple suicide, but Randolph is convinced far more is at stake. Working his way through the social elite of Pelican Bay he does uncover a truth no one expected and picks up a new partner for his business along the way.
2	"Mourning Cloak"	James V. Kern	Sig Herzig	October 12, 1959
Rex gets a strange note care of his office assistance requesting he come out to an old run down plantation house. It becomes obvious very quickly something is very wrong at the house especially when former employees turn up dead.
3	"Torch Song for Trumpet"	Leslie H. Martinson	Jim Barnett & Leo Townsend	October 19, 1959
Cal is asked by a young lady, Cindy Roberts to investigate how her previous lover Kip Kiley had been released early from jail and refuses to have anything to do with her. What Cal discovers is far more complex and involves the whole existence of the club scene on Bourbon Street.
4	"Woman in the River"	Leslie H. Martinson	Luther Davis	October 26, 1959
When police refuse to search for a young man's missing girlfriend, Rex and Cal agree to help him locate her. Guest star: Mary Tyler Moore.
5	"Girl in Trouble"	Reginald LeBorg	John Hawkins & Ward Hawkins	November 2, 1959
Cal sets out to prove an old friend is innocent of murder and becomes convinced that the killing is somehow gangland related. With Russ Conway (actor).
6	"Tiger Moth"	James V. Kern	Marie Baumer	November 9, 1959
7	"Secret of Hyacinth Bayou"	Andre de Toth	Story by : Kenneth Perkins, Teleplay by : William Spier	November 16, 1959
8	"Invitation to a Murder"	Richard LeBorg	Stephen Lord	November 23, 1959
9	"Mrs. Viner Vanishes"	Paul Henreid	Irving Elman	November 30, 1959
10	"Light Touch of Terror"	William J. Hole Jr.	A.J. Carothers	December 7, 1959
11	"The Golden Beetle"	Reginald LeBorg	William Spier	December 14, 1959
12	"The Black Magnolia"	Reginald LeBorg	Earl Baldwin	December 21, 1959
Guest star: Mary Tyler Moore.
13	"Portrait of Lenore"	Robert Gordon	Story by : Milton Geiger, Teleplay by : Milton Geiger & Charles Hoffman	December 28, 1959
14	"Kill With Kindness"	William J. Hole Jr.	Marie Baumer	January 4, 1960
15	"Inside Man"	Leslie H. Martinson	Story by : Ivan Goff & Ben Roberts, Teleplay by : Howard Browne	January 11, 1960
16	"Find My Face"	Paul Henreid	Michael Plant	January 18, 1960
17	"Knock on Any Tombstone"	William J. Hole Jr.	Story by : Sig Herzig, Teleplay by : Sig Herzig & Charles Hoffman	January 25, 1960
18	"Key to the City"	James V. Kern	Story by : Jim Barnett, Teleplay by : Robert C. Dennis	February 1, 1960
19	"The 10% Blues"	William J. Hole Jr.	Story by : Hugh Benson & Dick Nelson, Teleplay by : Stephen Lord	February 8, 1960
Guest star: Bill Erwin
20	"Melody in Diamonds"	James V. Kern	Doris Gilbert	February 15, 1960
21	"The House of Ledezan"	William J. Hole Jr.	Story by : David Evans, Teleplay by : Michael Cramoy & David Evans	February 22, 1960
22	"Target for Hate"	Leslie H. Martinson	Story by : Richard Matheson, Teleplay by : Richard Matheson & William L. Stuart	March 7, 1960
23	"The Missing Queen"	Paul Henreid	Dorothy B. Hughes, Doris Gilbert and James Patrick O'Neill	March 14, 1960
24	"Neon Nightmare"	William J. Hole Jr.	Dean Riesner	March 21, 1960
Guest star: Randy Stuart as Beejay.
25	"Wall of Silence"	Charles R. Rondeau	Sam Ross	March 28, 1960
26	"Twice Betrayed"	William J. Hole Jr.	Story by : Howard Browne, Teleplay by : William Bruckner	April 4, 1960
Guest stars: Tyler McVey and Judson Pratt.
27	"Swamp Fire"	Robert B. Sinclair	Story by : Edward Wellen, Teleplay by : Sig Herzig & Dean Riesner	April 11, 1960
Guest star: Tony Young as Prosper Gamillon.
28	"If a Body"	Leslie H. Martinson	Story by : Irving Elman, Teleplay by : Charles Hoffman & Irving Elman	April 18, 1960
29	"Six Hours to Midnight"	Charles R. Rondeau	Story by : Richard Bluel, Teleplay by : Lee Loeb	April 25, 1960
30	"Last Exit"	Leslie H. Martinson	Story by : Douglas Heyes, Teleplay by : W. Hermanos	May 2, 1960
31	"Deadly Persuasion"	Charles R. Rondeau	Berne Giler & W. Hermanos	May 9, 1960
32	"Suitable for Framing"	Leslie H. Martinson	Story by : Gerald Drayson Adams, Teleplay by : W. Hermanos & Charles Hoffman	May 16, 1960
33	"False Identity"	William J. Hole Jr.	Story by : David Goodis, Teleplay by : W. Hermanos	May 23, 1960
34	"Green Hell"	Charles R. Rondeau	Story by : Tom Gries & Al C. Ward, Teleplay by : W. Hermanos & Al C. Ward	May 30, 1960
35	"Ferry to Algiers"	William J. Hole Jr.	W. Hermanos	June 6, 1960
36	"Wagon Show"	Robert B. Sinclair	Story by : Hugh Benson, Teleplay by : W. Hermanos	June 13, 1960
Guest star: Brad Johnson as Michael Reynard.
37	"Interrupted Wedding"	William J. Hole Jr.	Story by : Laszlo Gorog, Teleplay by : Laszlo Gorog & W. Hermanos	June 20, 1960
Guest stars: Patrick McVey as John Crane and Randy Stuart as Betty Jane Robinson.
38	"Reunion"	William J. Hole Jr.	Story by : Nelson Gidding, Teleplay by : W. Hermanos	June 27, 1960
39	"Teresa"	William J. Hole Jr.	Story by : Whitman Chambers, Teleplay by : W. Hermanos	July 4, 1960

== Production ==
Bourbon Street Beat was broadcast on Mondays from 8:30 to 9:30 p.m. Eastern Time. Most of the show was filmed in California, but ABC purchased a half-interest in the Absinthe House in New Orleans to provide a local angle. William T. Orr was the executive producer, and Charles Hoffman was the producer. William Hole was the director.

== Cars used in episodes ==
- Cal Calhun's 1951 Chevrolet 'Styleline DeLuxe' Convertible
- Kenny Madison's 1959 Chevrolet Corvette Convertible with optional removable hardtop (certain episodes)
- Rex Randolph's 1959 Oldsmobile 98 Convertible
