= Roxane Berard =

Belgian-American actress (1933–2019)

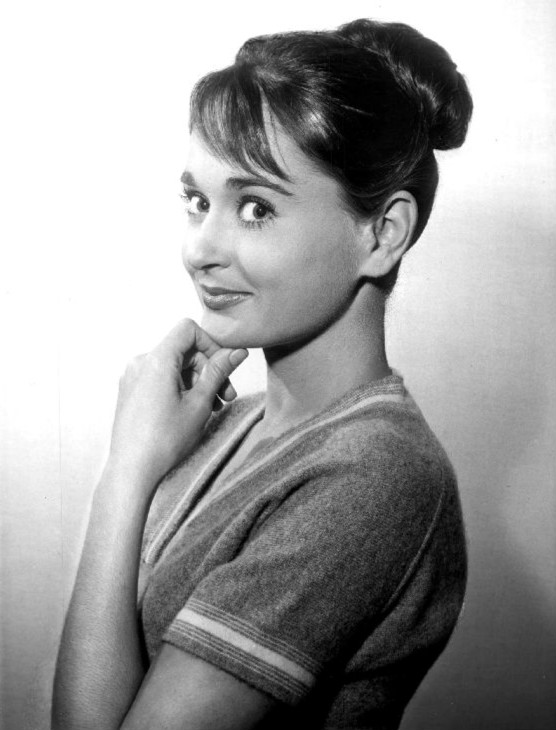
- Berard in 1960
- Born: January 21, 1933; Belgium
- Died: December 31, 2019 (aged 86)
- Years active: 1958–1970
- Spouse(s): William Dennis DeBerardinis (aka Willie Dennis; 1953-1960; divorced); Jack Travis Heller (1960-1980; divorced), 3 children Samuel F Bradley (1985-19??; divorced)

Roxane Berard (January 21, 1933 – December 31, 2019) was a Belgian-born American actress who was the leading lady in various episodes of thirty-four different American television series between 1958 and 1967.

One notable appearance was in 1964 when she played Ninette Rovel who murdered her husband Armand in the Perry Mason episode "The Case of the Fifty Millionth Frenchman".

Berard had a gamine quality similar to that of Audrey Hepburn, with whom she was inevitably and continuously compared, as they purportedly resembled each other, and Berard frequently worked with a French accent.

== Early years ==
Roxane Berard was born in Belgium on January 21, 1933.

== Career ==
Television series in which Berard appeared included Rawhide, Colt .45, Maverick (in which she made two appearances with James Garner and one apiece with Roger Moore and Jack Kelly), 77 Sunset Strip with Efrem Zimbalist Jr., Zorro, The Deputy, Have Gun – Will Travel (three episodes), Bronco, Bourbon Street Beat, Surfside Six, Tales of Wells Fargo, The Tab Hunter Show, Straightaway, Perry Mason, Father Knows Best, and Get Smart. Berard was also a San Diego, California-based mural painter.

== Personal life and death ==
Berard was married three times:

- William Dennis DeBerardinis (aka Willie Dennis; 1953 – March 15, 1960; divorced)
- Jack Travis Heller (April 23, 1960 – May 1, 1980; divorced), 3 children
- Samuel F Bradley (September 4, 1985 – 19??; divorced)

Roxane Berard died on December 31, 2019, at the age of 86.
