= Brad Johnson (actor, born 1924) =

American actor (1924–1981)

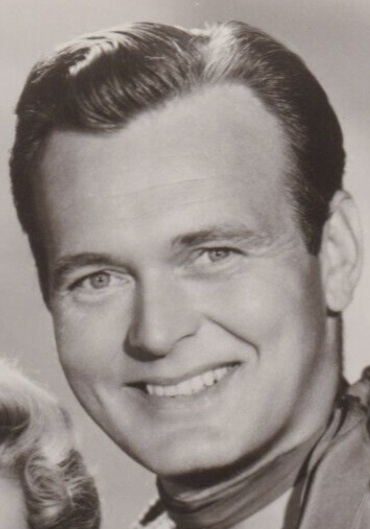
- Johnson in Annie Oakley, 1964
- Born: Elmer Bradley Johnson; July 23, 1924; Yuba County, California, U.S.
- Died: April 4, 1981 (aged 56); Burbank, California, U.S.
- Education: University of Southern California
- Occupations: Actor; Real estate developer
- Years active: 1950–1967 (acting)
- Spouse: Adele Cook Johnson (m. 1950)
- Children: 2
- Relatives: Azura Skye (granddaughter)

Elmer Bradley Johnson (July 23, 1924 – April 4, 1981), was an American film and television actor, best remembered for his role as the deputy Lofty Craig on the 1950s Western series, Annie Oakley.

Johnson was born in Marysville, California. He attended Placer Union High School and graduated from Sacramento High School and the University of Southern California (USC). He was a pilot in the Air Force, and while he was stationed in Japan he worked at a radio station that was part of the Armed Forces Radio Network.

In addition to his work on Annie Oakley, Johnson appeared on other television programs, including The Life and Legend of Wyatt Earp and Maverick. His personal appearances included the State Fair of Oklahoma and the Barstow Rodeo and Riding Club parade.

Johnson married Adele Cook on April 15, 1950. Cook (also known as Adele Webb and Amanda Webb) was an actress. She and Johnson met when they played the leads in a production at USC. They had a son and a daughter.

== Filmography ==
Year	Title	Role	Notes
1951	Call Me Mister	Soldier	Uncredited
1951	Bedtime for Bonzo	Student #1	
1951	Follow the Sun	Hogan's Caddy	Uncredited
1952	The Greatest Show on Earth	Reporter	Uncredited
1952	Outlaw Women	Chuck	Uncredited
1953	The Lady Wants Mink	Bud Dunn	
1953	The Marksman	Rider	
1953	Champ for a Day	Hyde Hotel Desk Clerk	Uncredited
1953	Calamity Jane	Officer	Uncredited
1955	Last of the Desperados	Deputy Tip	Uncredited
1958	The Buccaneer	Rocket Officer	
1960	Heller in Pink Tights	Poker Player	Uncredited
1965	The Art of Love	Art Collector	Uncredited
