= Lee Frost (director) =

American filmmaker

- Born: August 14, 1935; Globe, Arizona, United States
- Died: May 25, 2007 (aged 71); New Orleans, Louisiana, United States
- Occupations: Film director, screenwriter

Lee Frost was an American film director, producer, cinematographer, editor and occasional actor. Frost directed a string of exploitation films including Hot Spur (1968), The Scavengers (1969), Love Camp 7 (1969), Chain Gang Women (1971), Chrome and Hot Leather (1971), The Thing with Two Heads (1972), Policewomen (1974), The Black Gestapo (1975), Dixie Dynamite (1976) and Private Obsession (1995).

== Background ==
Frost was born in Globe, Arizona, on August 14, 1935. He grew up in Glendale, California, and also in Oahu, Hawaii.

The different names he used for his work were R.L. Frost, R. Lee Frost and David Kayne. Other names or variants used were David Kane, F.C. Perl, Elov Peterssons and Les Emerson; Carl Borch, Leoni Valentino and Robert L. Frost.

=== Death ===
Lee Frost died in New Orleans, Louisiana, on May 25, 2007, aged 71.

== Films ==
=== Director ===
Lee Frost's first film, released in 1962, was the sexploitation comedy Surftide 77. Also released that year was House on Bare Mountain which he co-directed with Wes Bishop, whom with he would continue to collaborate with throughout his career. He would be credited as director under the name R.L. Frost for this film and all others until late 1969, when he began using a variety of other pseudonyms.

In 1965 Frost teamed up with David F. Friedman to direct The Defilers on which Frost would also act as cinematographer and editor. The film, shot in black and white, tells the story of two hedonistic young men from wealthy homes who abduct an attractive young blonde woman to use as their sex slave. Themes of misogyny and BDSM would continue to appear in Frost's films throughout most of his career.

In 1966, Frost was director, writer and one of the cast in the mondo film Mondo Bizarro. For his part in writing the narrative for the feature, he was credited as David Kayne. Mondo Bizarro was followed by two more mondo films, Mondo Freudo and The Forbidden, all of which were released in 1966 and were shot in color.

The sexploitation films The Animal and The Pick-Up, both directed by Frost and featuring roles by ubiquitous exploitation actor John Alderman, were released in 1968. Like 1965's The Defilers both films feature themes of misogyny and BDSM, and were shot on black and white film stock. In The Pick-Up Frost highlights one scene with a musical number performed by singer-songwriter and guitarist Jim Sullivan. Also released in 1968 was Frost's Hot Spur, a Western themed sexploitation film shot in color.

In 1969 he directed the western/war exploitation film The Scavengers as well as the Nazi themed Love Camp 7.

He directed Chrome and Hot Leather that was released in 1971. This was a biker/exploitation film about a group of Vietnam vets taking on a motor bike gang. The film starred William Smith, Tony Young, Michael Haynes, Peter Brown and Marvin Gaye.

He directed the exploitation sci-fi film The Thing With Two Heads, that starred Ray Milland, Rosey Grier and Don Marshall that was released in 1972. This was a film about a dying doctor who gets his head transplanted to the body of a man, Jack Moss, who was wrongfully convicted of murder.

After the advent of hardcore pornographic films in the mid 70's and the subsequent decline in demand for softcore and sexploitation films Frost's output would include producing and directing a handful of adult films including 1974's A Climax of Blue Power (wherein he used the pseudonym F.C. Perl) which misappropriated its soundtrack primarily from Barry White's original score to the film Together Brothers . Reviled by critics for its intermingling of violence and twisted sex the film follows a security guard who masquerades as a police officer and abuses prostitutes before happening upon a murder and subsequently exacting his own punishment. In 1974 he directed the sexploitation period film Poor Cecily.

=== Writer ===
Frost wrote the story for the film Race with the Devil, which was released in 1975. In this film Peter Fonda, Warren Oates, Loretta Swit and Lara Parker star as two couples that are being chased by Satan worshippers.

=== Legacy ===
Frost was voted into the GIMP Hall of Fame in 2021.
