= Mother, Jugs & Speed =

1976 film by Peter Yates

- Theatrical release poster
- Directed by: Peter Yates
- Screenplay by: Tom Mankiewicz
- Story by: Stephen Manes; Tom Mankiewicz
- Produced by: Peter Yates; Tom Mankiewicz
- Starring: Bill Cosby; Raquel Welch; Harvey Keitel
- Cinematography: Ralph Woolsey
- Edited by: Frank P. Keller
- Distributed by: 20th Century Fox
- Release date: May 26, 1976
- Running time: 98 minutes
- Country: United States
- Language: English
- Budget: $3 million
- Box office: $7 million (North America)

Mother, Jugs & Speed is a 1976 American black comedy film directed by Peter Yates. It stars Bill Cosby (Mother), Raquel Welch (Jugs), Harvey Keitel (Speed), and Larry Hagman as employees of an independent ambulance service trying to survive in Los Angeles.

== Plot ==
The F+B Ambulance Company is locked in an intense battle with the Unity Ambulance Company to win a city contract for providing ambulance service to a territory within Los Angeles. Their star driver is "Mother" Tucker, a talented antihero who drinks alcohol on duty, harasses nuns, and behaves brazenly toward practically everybody he meets, including his partner Leroy. Indeed, the entire company is a band of misfits, including the hypersexual John Murdoch, his partner Walker, putative medical student Bliss, and brash Texan "Rodeo" Moxey. The dispatcher and switchboard operator is Jennifer, whom the drivers nickname "Jugs" for her ample bosom. Harry "Doughnut" Fishbine runs the company, using occasionally underhanded means (such as kickbacks) to maintain an income stream.

When Walker is injured after falling through a staircase on a call, Harry Fishbine hires Tony Malatesta, a disgraced sheriff's detective and former Vietnam War ambulance driver. Upon learning that Tony has been suspended from the Sheriff's Department due to allegations that he sold cocaine to children, Mother nicknames him "Speed". Speed is initially paired with Murdoch, though their partnership is strained when Speed must stop Murdoch from raping an unconscious female college student who has overdosed on Seconal. On a false emergency call, Leroy is shot and killed by a junkie demanding drugs. When Mother pulls a gun on the junkie, the junkie commits suicide. Later that night, a drunken Mother assaults Murdoch for stating that Leroy's death "doesn't count"; though Murdoch states this in regard to the drivers' "dead body" pool, Mother perceives it as an attack on the character of his dead partner. Harry then partners Speed with Mother to alleviate his driver shortage.

Meanwhile, Jugs has obtained her Emergency Medical Technician (EMT) and ambulance driver certifications, and forces her way onto F+B's active roster with threats of sexual discrimination lawsuits. When Speed fakes an injury to prevent Jugs' arrest for misuse of an ambulance, the two fall in love. Though Jugs proves a capable EMT, she loses her nerve after a pregnant woman under her care suffers a severe obstetrical hemorrhage and bleeds to death in Mother's ambulance. Jugs secludes herself afterward until Mother counsels her and gives her the courage to return to work.

At a City Hall meeting, City Councilman Warren informs the owners of both Unity and F+B that they will not be awarded the contract—it will instead be awarded to a larger, established company. To save their businesses, Unity's owner, Charles Taylor, proposes that their two companies merge. Though the councilman is agreeable to the merger, Fishbine is not. The discussion is interrupted by an emergency call: Murdoch, intoxicated and armed with a handgun, has broken into F+B's bus garage office with Walker and is holding Mrs. Fishbine hostage. All of Unity's and F+B's ambulances descend on the F+B garage; upon arrival, Murdoch opens fire and hits Speed in the shoulder. When Mother charges onto the garage grounds to rescue his ambulance, he comes face to face with Murdoch; Murdoch tries to shoot Mother, but his gun is empty. A deputy sheriff then shoots and kills Murdoch.

In the aftermath of this incident, F+B does merge with Unity, forming the Fishbine + Unity (F+U) Ambulance Company, based out of the old F+B garage. (The new initialism for the company is also a slang abbreviation of "fuck you"; the old F+B stood for "Fish + Bine".) Speed, who has been cleared of all charges, is reinstated to the Sheriff's Department, though he remains romantically involved with Jugs. Jugs is initially relegated to switchboard duty again, until Mother insists that she become his new partner. The two drive off together, with Mother harassing the nuns one more time as the movie ends.

== Cast ==
- Bill Cosby as Orlin "Mother" Tucker
- Raquel Welch as Jennifer "Jugs"
- Harvey Keitel as Anthony "Speed" Malatesta
- Allen Garfield as Harry "Doughnut" Fishbine
- Larry Hagman as John Murdoch
- Michael McManus as Hal Walker
- Allan Warnick as Arthur Bliss
- Bruce Davison as Leroy Watkins
- Dick Butkus as Lee "Rodeo" Moxey
- L.Q. Jones as Sheriff Davey
- Ric Carrott as Deputy Harvey Warnicker
- Bill Henderson as Charles Taylor
- Valerie Curtin as Mrs. Naomi "Peaches" Fishbine
- Milt Kamen as Barney, Hamburger Stand Owner
- Toni Basil as Junkie Who Kills Leroy

There was originally a role written for professional wrestler Lillian Ellison (The Fabulous Moolah) in the film, but she had to drop out of the role due to a gallbladder infection.

== TV version ==
20th Century Fox attempted to turn the film into a television series, although none of the original cast participated. The program was titled Mother, Juggs & Speed with a double "g" because the network would not allow the lead female character to have a name that made explicit reference to her breasts. Instead, producers added the concept that Jennifer's nickname was taken from her real last name, Juggston. The series was not picked up, but ABC aired the pilot as a one-time special on Thursday, August 17, 1978.

== Production ==
Joseph Barbera, one half of the legendary cartoon-creating duo Hanna-Barbera, served as executive producer for this film. Tom Mankiewicz says it was Barbera's idea to make a film about ambulance driving. He had a deal with 20th Century Fox who paid a writer to develop a script. Mankiewicz, then best known for writing several James Bond films, became interested and was hired. He did research on the subject and wrote his own script, and then attached Peter Yates as director. Alan Ladd Jr., then head of production for Fox, said he would make the film if it could be done for less than $3 million.

Yates and Mankiewicz thought the lead role of Mother Tucker was perfect for Gene Hackman. They offered him the role, but Hackman was exhausted from working on Lucky Lady and declined. However he recommended Bill Cosby as an alternative; Yates, Mankiewicz and Ladd all agreed and Cosby accepted the part. The tight budget meant the leads had to accept deferred payment. The female lead was offered to Valerie Perrine but she would not take deferred payment, so Raquel Welch was cast instead.

== Reception ==
According to Tom Mankiewicz the film was made for around $3 million and grossed $17 million.

Mother, Jugs & Speed was referenced in the 2006 film Relative Strangers multiple times, most notably during the game of Charades scene.

Mother, Jugs & Speed was rated in M in New Zealand and Australia, where it was previously rated PG.

Mother Jugs & Speed received mixed critical reviews. On Rotten Tomatoes, the film has a 53% rating based on 17 reviews.
