= John Bliss =

American actor (1930–2008)

- Born: October 8, 1930; Peoria, Illinois, U.S.
- Died: February 28, 2008 (aged 77); Glendale, California, U.S.
- Other name: Johnny Bliss
- Occupation: Actor
- Years active: 1957–2007

John Bliss (October 8, 1930 – February 28, 2008) was an American actor known for playing the role of the 8th grade Social Studies teacher and former Principal Irving Pal on Ned's Declassified School Survival Guide. He was also seen in the first episode of Out of Jimmy's Head. He fondly remembered George Clooney, and how George was so polite and called him "Mr. Bliss" and offered him food on the set of Intolerable Cruelty, in which they both appeared.

Bliss played Mr. Pickering in the TV series Andy Richter Controls the Universe.

He guest starred as a character called Emile in an episode of TV series Get Smart called Bronzefinger.

Bliss was born to acting parents in Peoria, Illinois, but moved from time to time (Florida, New York, Europe). When he was a child, acting on the stage with his parents, they rarely told others of their true profession of acting, because it was "looked down upon in those days."

In the 1950s, Bliss appeared on Studio One, Playhouse 90 and Kraft Theater

Bliss died on February 28, 2008, from complications of aortic aneurysm. He was 77.

== Filmography ==
Year	Title	Role	Notes
1957	A Face in the Crowd	Barefoot Baritone	Uncredited
1962	The Miracle Worker	Admissions Officer	Uncredited
1964	Vengeance	Deputy Sam	
1965	Angel's Flight	Sergeant	
1968	Invitation to Ruin	Lt. Harris	
1969	The Scavengers	Captain Steve Harris	
1971	Chain Gang Women	Prison Guard	
1972	The Thing with Two Heads	Donald	
1975	The Invitation	Harris	
1976	Dixie Dynamite	Mortician	
1986	Mutilations	Oliver Matson	
2003	Intolerable Cruelty	Mr. MacKinnon	
2004	Imaginary Heroes	Murph	
2005	IOWA	Pastor Krause	
2006	Art School Confidential	Vince's Grandpa	
2006–2007	Ned's Declassified School Survival Guide	Irving Pal	
2007	Out of Jimmy's Head	Gramps	Final role
