= Jack Kelly (actor) =

American actor (1927–1992)

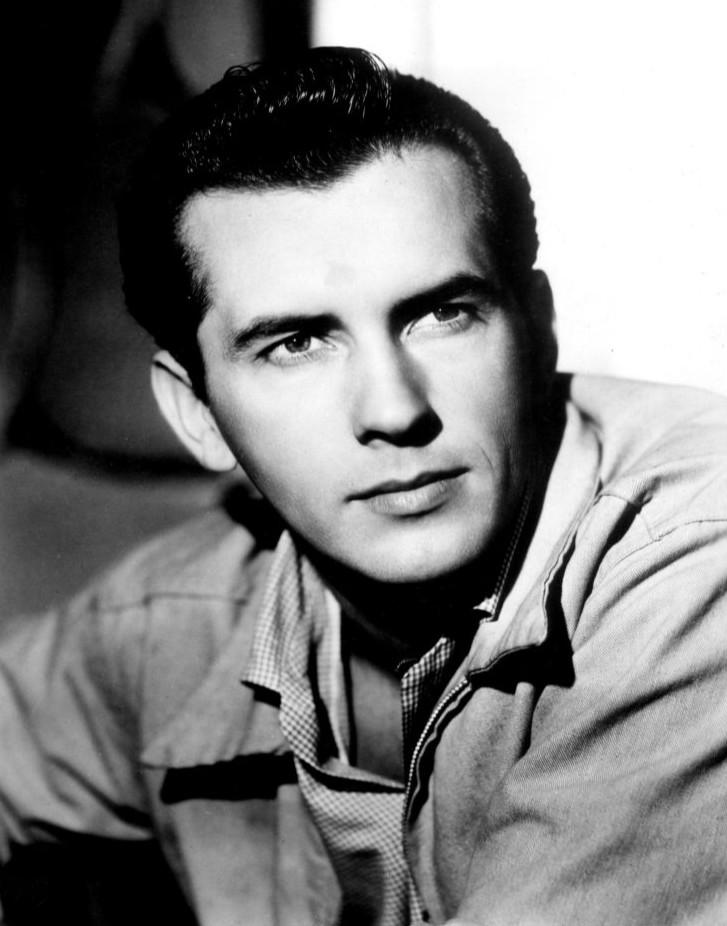
- Kelly in 1957
- Born: John Augustus Kelly Jr. September 16, 1927; New York City, NY, U.S.
- Died: November 7, 1992 (aged 65); Huntington Beach, California, U.S.
- Occupations: Actor, politician
- Years active: 1939–1992
- Spouses: May Wynn (m. 1956; div. 1964) Jo Ann Smith (m. 1969)
- Children: 1
- Relatives: Nancy Kelly (sister)

Mayor of Huntington Beach, California
- In office 1983–1986

John Augustus Kelly Jr. (September 16, 1927 – November 7, 1992) was an American film and television actor most noted for the role of Bart Maverick in the television series Maverick, which ran on ABC from 1957 to 1962.

Kelly shared the series, rotating as the lead from week to week, first with James Garner as Bret Maverick (1957–1960) then with Roger Moore as Beau Maverick (1960–1961) and Robert Colbert as Brent Maverick (1961, for two episodes), before becoming the only Maverick (alternating with reruns from the Garner era) in the fifth season.

Kelly later became a politician, serving from 1983 to 1986 as the mayor of Huntington Beach, California.

== Early life ==
John Augustus Kelly Jr. was born in Astoria, Queens, New York, one of four children, to Ann Mary (née Walsh) and John Augustus Kelly Sr. Jackie, as he was called as a child, came from a prominent theatrical family. His mother, Ann "Nan" Kelly, had been a popular stage actress and John Robert Powers model. Kelly Senior was a theater ticket broker, and after he moved the family to Hollywood, entered the real estate business.

His sister was actress Nancy Kelly. His other two siblings, Carole and William Clement, also tried show business. Kelly served as a weather observer in the U.S. Army Air Corps during World War II, where he was on the first B-29 to fly over the Arctic Circle.

== Career ==
=== Early roles ===
Kelly made his film debut in an uncredited role in the 1939 biopic The Story of Alexander Graham Bell. In early 1954, he appeared in the film noir Drive a Crooked Road, written by Blake Edwards and Richard Quine. On July 15, 1954, Kelly played the gunfighter, cattleman, and bandit Clay Allison in the television series Stories of the Century.

In 1955-1956 television season, Kelly starred in a series based on the 1942 feature film Kings Row starring Ann Sheridan and Ronald Reagan. He played Dr. Parris Mitchell, a young psychiatrist coping with the narrow-minded environment of his small town while Robert Horton played the part originally performed by Reagan in the theatrical film. King's Row was one-third of the Warner Bros. Presents wheel series, hosted by Gig Young. It rotated at the scheduled hour of 7:30 Eastern on Tuesday with a similar television version of the popular movie Casablanca as well as the new ABC Western series Cheyenne. After the series ended in 1956, Kelly appeared in Forbidden Planet (1956) and She Devil (1957), along with guest roles on Fireside Theater, Schlitz Playhouse of Stars, Lux Video Theatre, and Gunsmoke.

=== Maverick (1957–1962) ===
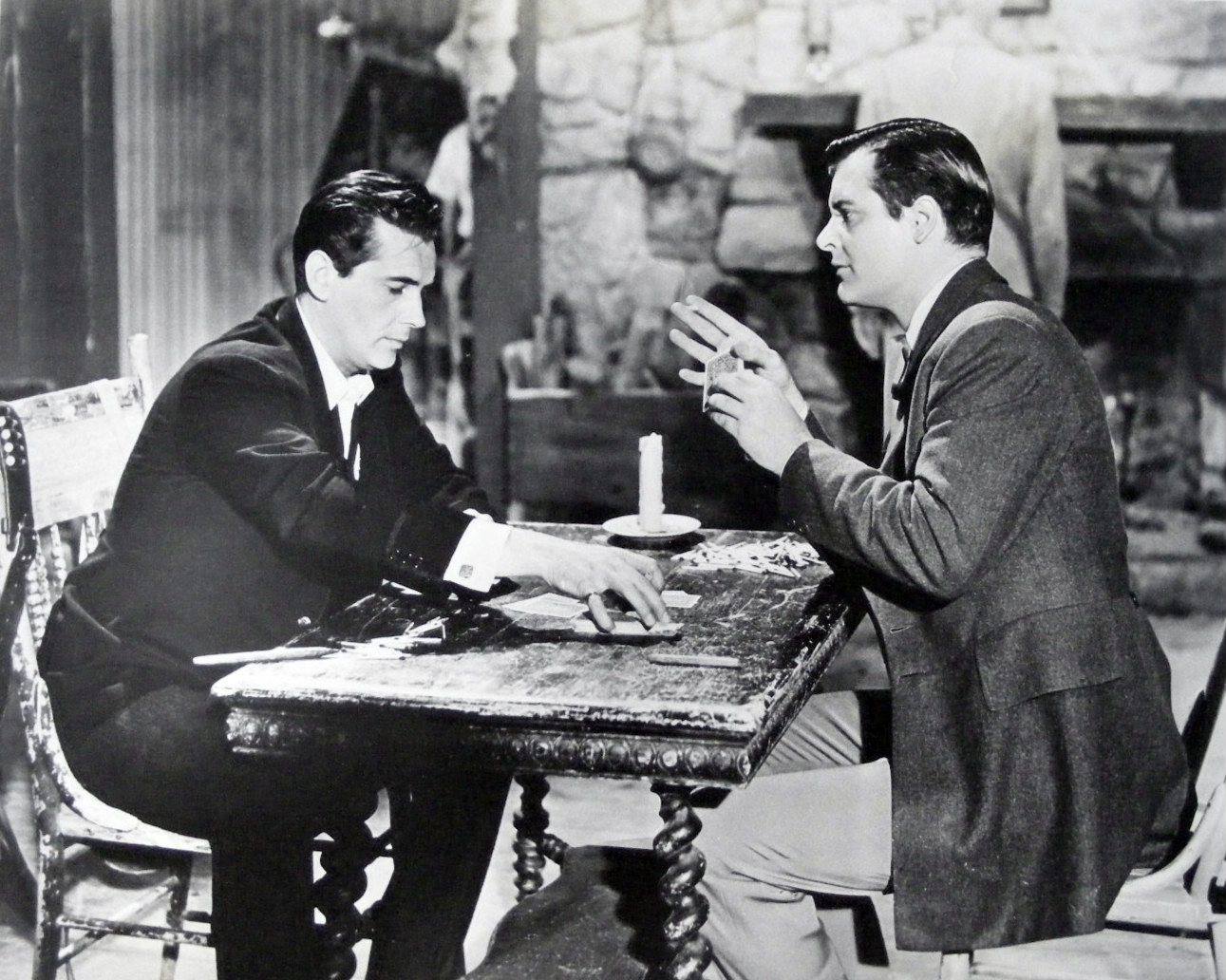
Kelly as Bart Maverick and Richard Long as Gentleman Jack Darby

The various anti-heroic Mavericks were dapper professional poker-players roaming the Old West with the benefit of superb scripts (at least in the first two seasons; the show gradually declined during the last three seasons). The series had an enormous cultural impact during a time when there were only three television networks and most American cities had only three TV channels to choose from.

Maverick's demanding filming schedule had caused production to lag behind early on. The producers decided to give Bret Maverick (James Garner) a brother so as not to run out of episodes long before the end of the season. Thus, Kelly was introduced as Bart Maverick in "Hostage", the eighth episode of the series.

Kelly shared the lead with James Garner in one of the show's famous episodes, "Shady Deal at Sunny Acres", on which the first half of the 1973 movie The Sting appears to be based. The pair also co-starred in the famous "Pappy" episode in which Garner played the brothers' much-quoted father Beauregard "Pappy" Maverick, in addition to his regular role of Bret. Aided by trick photography, Bret and Pappy play cards together in one scene (Kelly had a dual role in the episode as well, playing Bart and elderly Uncle Bentley "Bent" Maverick). Bart rescued Bret at the climax of "Duel at Sundown", in which Garner fought guest star Clint Eastwood.

Garner had first choice of which part he would play in the two-brother episodes, which delineated the brothers as "Maverick 1" and "Maverick 2" in the scripts, giving him an enormous advantage. All but one script during the show's first two years were written with Garner in mind regardless of which actor was being cast. Series creator Roy Huggins insisted that the writers visualize Garner as Maverick while writing the scripts, according to his Archive of American Television interview. The second-season episode in which Maverick was written with Kelly in mind instead of Garner was titled "Passage to Fort Doom".

Although the "solo" episodes in which Bart appeared tended to be somewhat more dramatic than the often more humorous Bret episodes, Kelly displayed his comedic skills in lighter Maverick outings such as "Hadley's Hunters" and "The People's Friend". Kelly actually appeared in more episodes of Maverick than James Garner, who left the show following a contract dispute in 1960 to successfully accelerate his theatrical film career. Kelly appeared in approximately 75 episodes due to his remaining for the entire run of the series; Garner is in 52 episodes altogether not counting introducing Kelly's earlier solo episodes in a separate frontispiece to ease audiences into the presence of a second Maverick during much of the first season.

In the wake of Garner's departure, Roger Moore played Bart's cousin Beau Maverick in 14 episodes, sharing the screen with Kelly in three of them, while Garner look-alike Robert Colbert appeared in two installments as a third brother wearing Bret's costume and named Brent, one of which briefly featured Kelly. The series was canceled after the fifth season, which consisted of Kelly appearing as the only Maverick in new episodes alternating with reruns of Garner shows from earlier seasons. The billing at the beginning of the show was reversed in the fifth season, with Kelly being billed above Garner. Kelly maintained that he was never notified of the cancellation by the studio but instead wound up learning about it in a newspaper article.

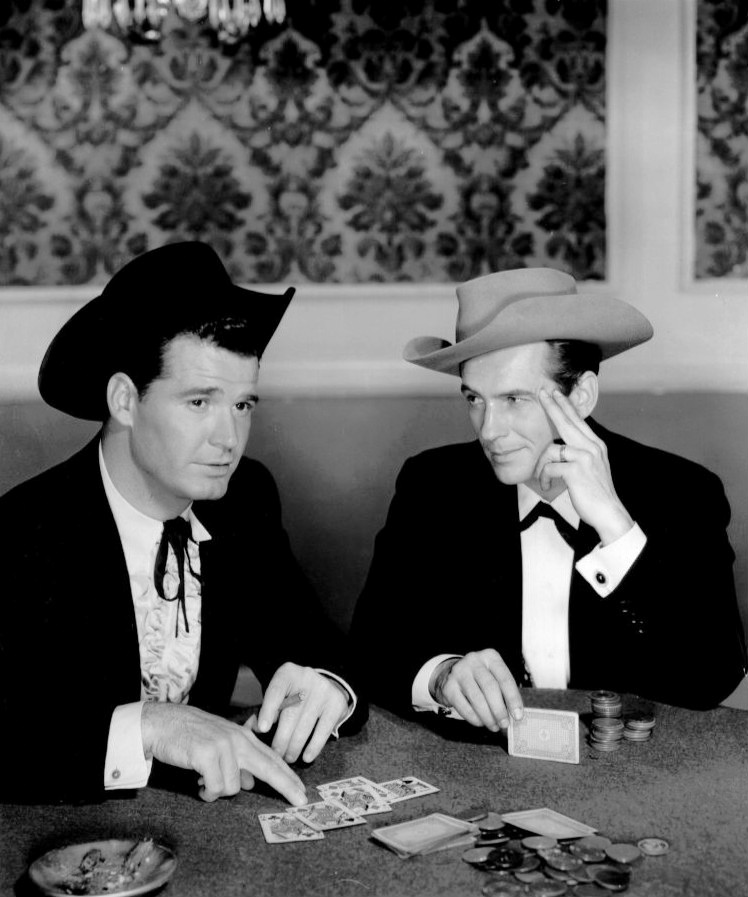
James Garner and Jack Kelly

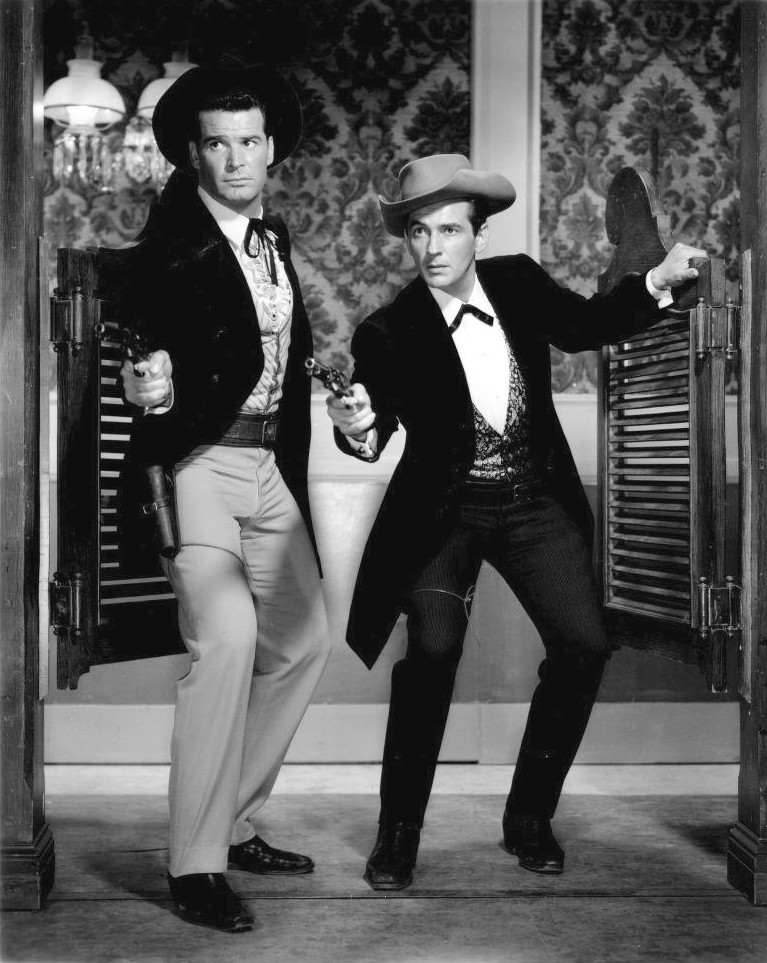
James Garner and Kelly

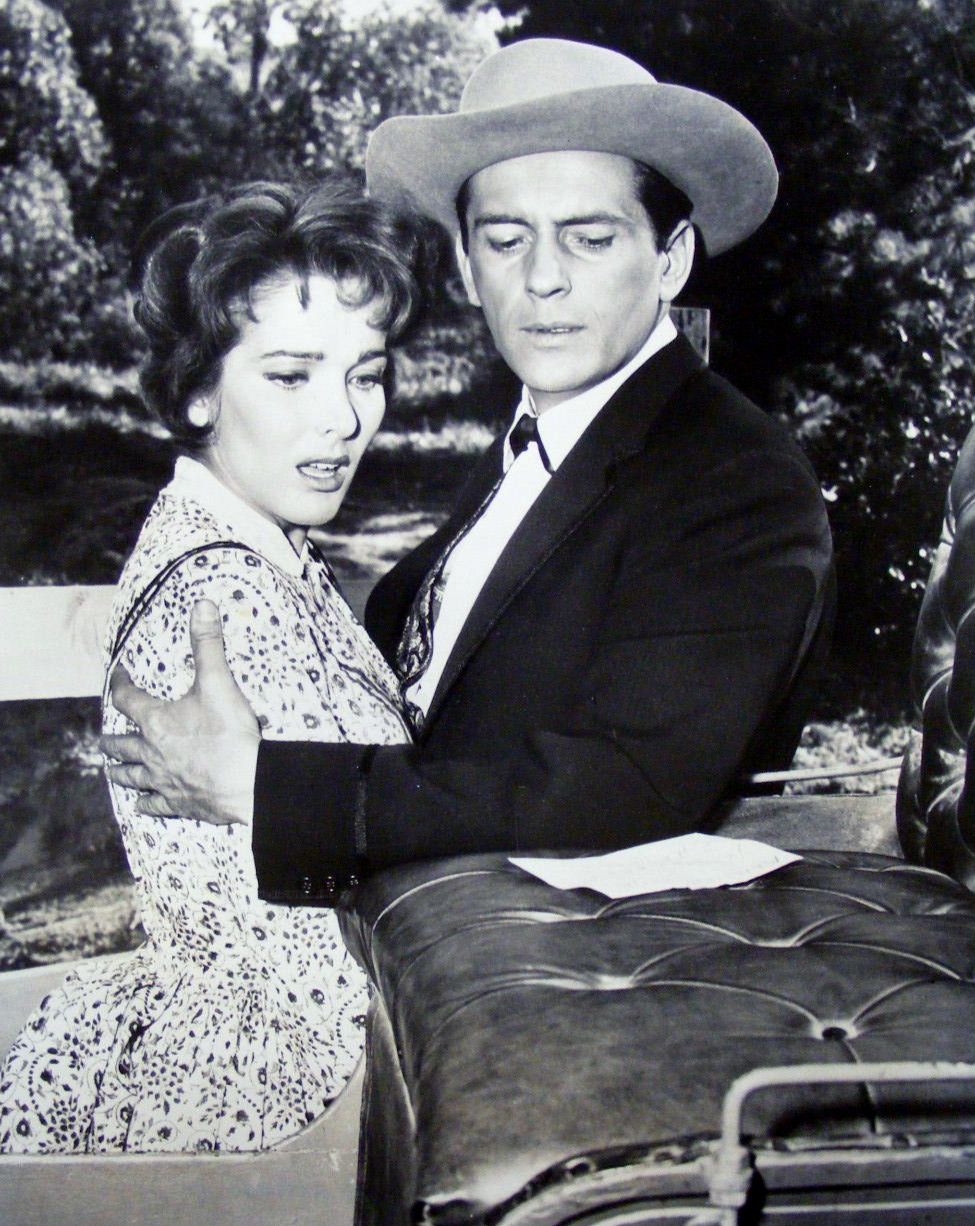
Julie Adams and Kelly

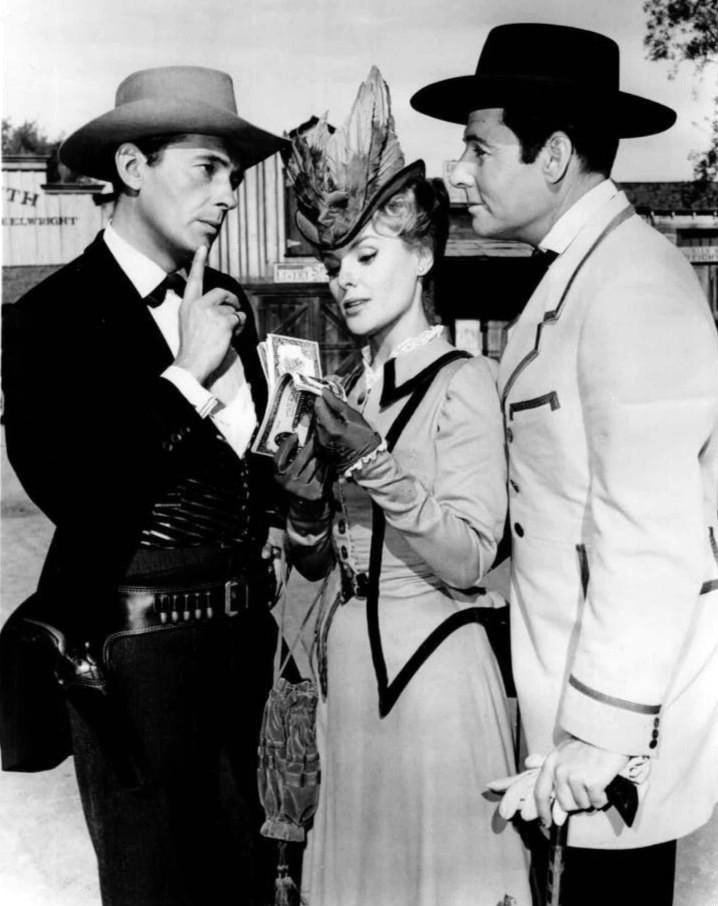
Kelly, Kathleen Crowley and Mike Road

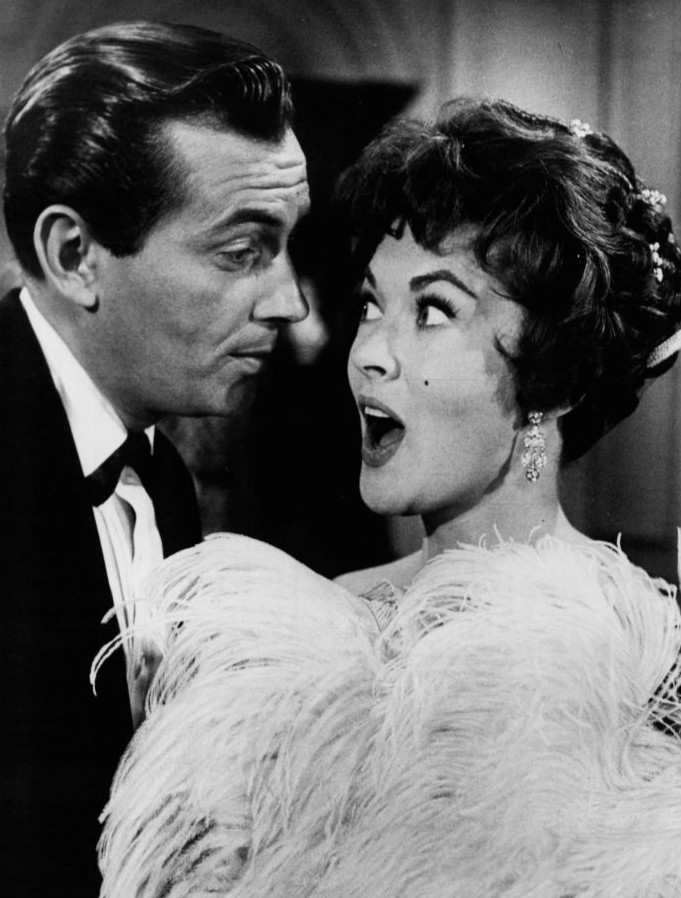
Kelly and Paula Raymond

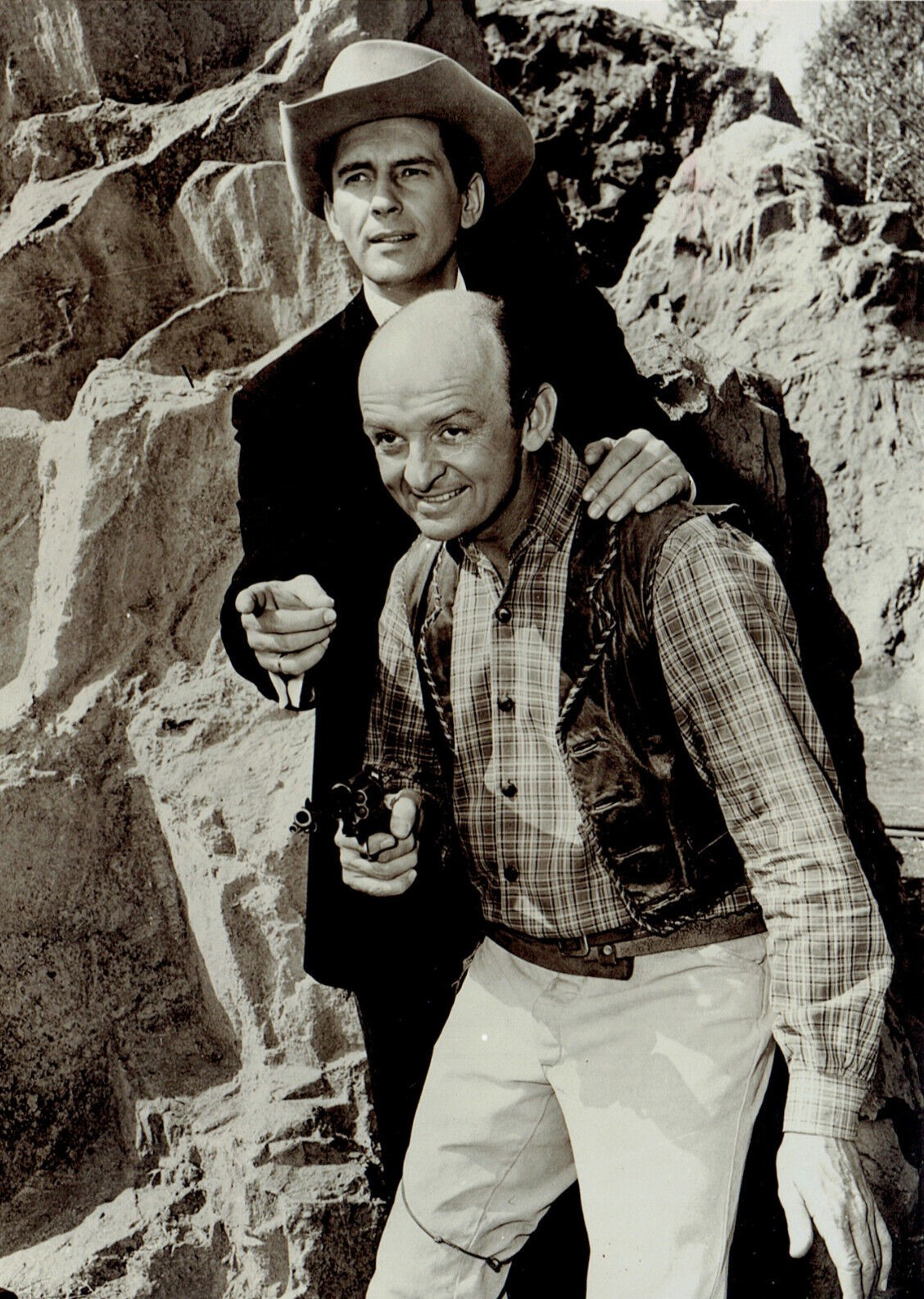
Kelly and Jackie Searl

=== Later career ===
When Maverick ended in 1962, Kelly continued acting with roles in a number of films and television shows. In 1962, he played the lead in Red Nightmare (also known as The Commies Are Coming, the Commies Are Coming in its derisive 1985 video re-release incarnation) a Cold War film narrated by Jack Webb in which Kelly's character wakes up one morning to discover that America has been taken over by Communists.

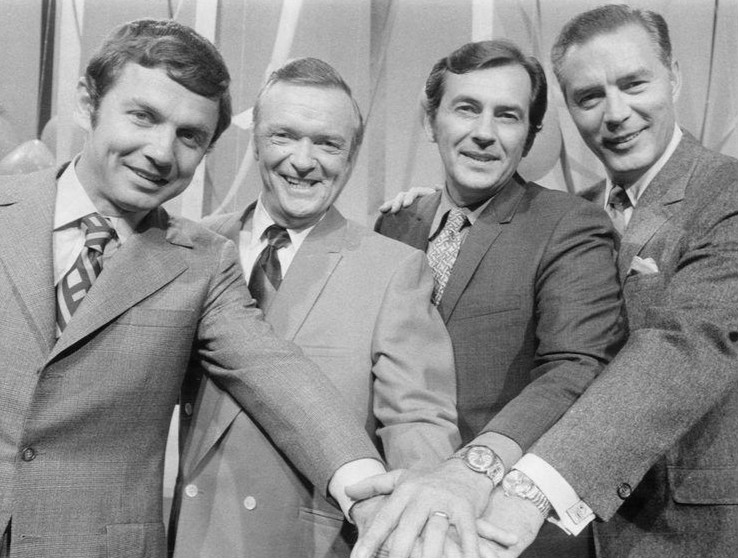
NBC game show hosts in 1970. From left: Art James, Bob Clayton, Kelly and Art Fleming.

On December 30, 1963, Kelly appeared in "The Fenton Canaby Story" on ABC's Wagon Train. Canaby, played by Kelly, is a former trailmaster with a dark secret he refuses to discuss. He is attracted to Lucy Garrison, a young woman with her own questionable past portrayed by Barbara Bain. Throughout the 1960's he was featured on episodes of the NBC television programs Chrysler Theatre and Suspense Theatre.

Kelly co-starred in Commandos (1968) and as a villain dressed quite similarly to Bart Maverick who beats Angie Dickinson with his belt in his hotel room in Young Billy Young (1969). From 1969 to 1971, Kelly hosted the daytime game show Sale of the Century, but he was replaced by Joe Garagiola. He was also briefly a series regular in Get Christie Love! (1974) and The Hardy Boys/Nancy Drew Mysteries (1978), and performed many lucrative television commercial voice-overs.

In 1977 Kelly appeared as obstreperous villains for a few moments in two episodes of James Garner's series Rockford Files. The first appearance was in the season 3 episode "The Becker Connection," and the second was the first show of season 4, "Beamer's Last Case" as a jealous husband. In 1978, he briefly appeared as Bart Maverick and was again paired with Garner in the TV movie The New Maverick and in Garner's TV series Bret Maverick (1981; Kelly appeared momentarily at the end of the final episode of the show and would have become a regular had it been renewed). He showed up on a 1983 episode of The Fall Guy, costumed as Bart Maverick but playing himself in a story that rounded up many classic TV cowboys. In 1991, he reprised the role of Bart Maverick one last time in the Kenny Rogers vehicle The Gambler Returns: The Luck of the Draw. Kelly died the following year.

== Business and politics ==
Kelly's acting roles became less frequent in the late 1970s as he became more involved in real estate and local politics. He started buying real estate in Huntington Beach in the mid-1960s and moved there permanently in 1971.

He formed August II, Inc. to hold the real estate assets in June 1965 in Huntington Beach.

His wife Jo became a real estate broker and did much of the business management of the real estate business, especially while Kelly was involved with Huntington Beach city government.

During the 1980s and early 1990s, he served as Huntington Beach city councilman and mayor campaigning with the slogan "Let Maverick Solve Your Problems."

== Personal life and death ==
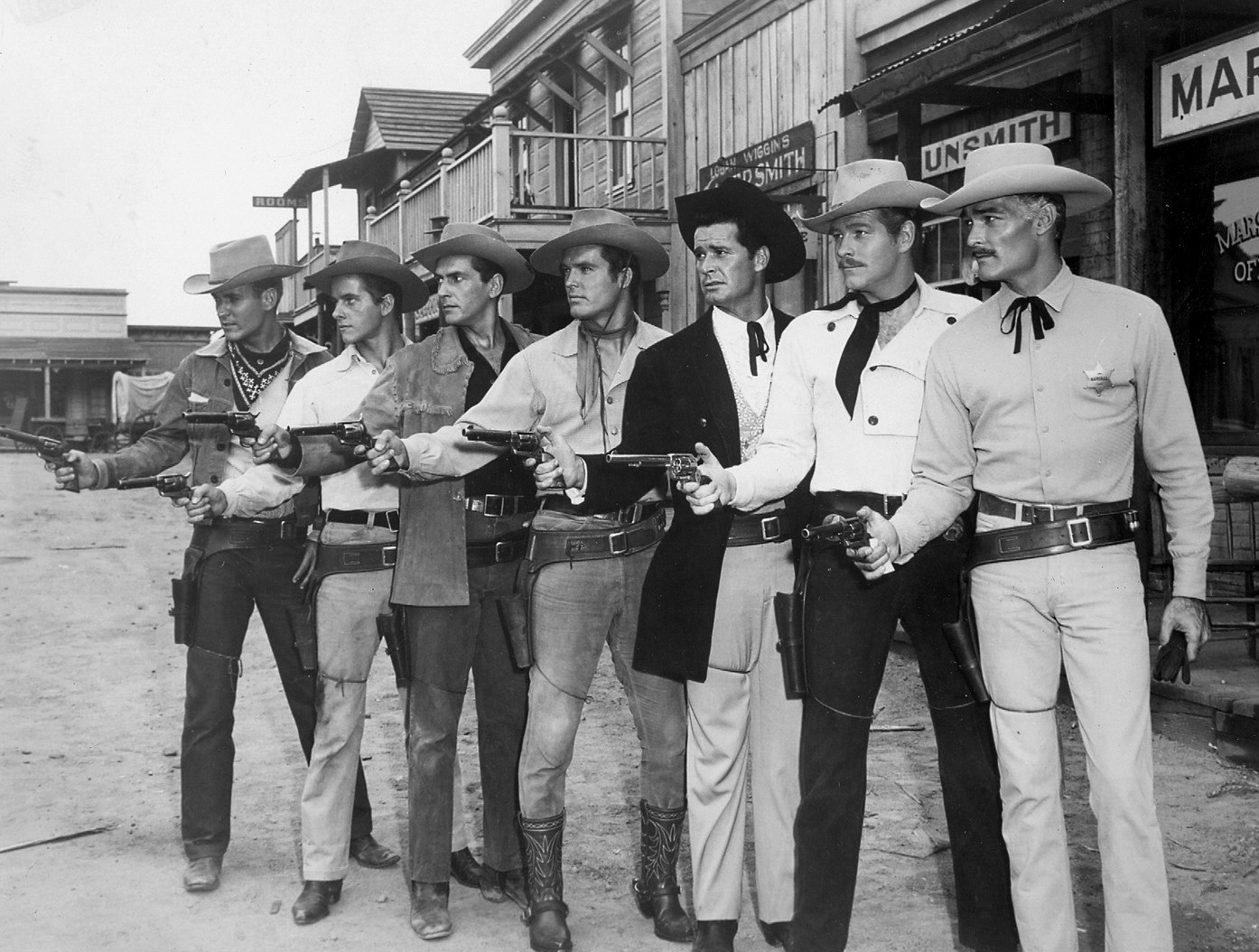
Publicity still with 1959 Warner Bros. series leads Will Hutchins (Sugarfoot), Peter Brown (Lawman), Jack Kelly (Maverick), Ty Hardin (Bronco), James Garner (Maverick), Wayde Preston (Colt .45), and John Russell (Lawman)

Kelly married actress May Wynn (real name: Donna Lee Hickey) on October 14, 1956. They separated in February 1964 and were divorced on October 19, 1964. She stated in court that they had been arguing frequently the last two years and he started staying out all night.

Following the divorce, he dated Karen Steele for a short time.

He married Jo Ann Smith in Las Vegas, Nevada on October 16, 1969. The following November, their daughter Nicole was born. Nicole is the founder of and executive producer at August II Productions.

On April 28, 1992, Kelly suffered a heart attack. A little over six months later he died of a stroke at Humana Hospital in Huntington Beach, California on November 7, 1992. He was age 65.

Jo Kelly became an extra in film and television productions, helped others learn the business, and wrote the book The Truth about Being an Extra (2006).

== Filmography ==
Year	Title	Role	Notes
1939	The Story of Alexander Graham Bell	Banker's Son	uncredited
1939	Young Mr. Lincoln	Matt Clay As A Boy	uncredited
1949	Fighting Man of the Plains	Cattleman	uncredited
1949	Holiday Affair	Drunk On Train	uncredited
1949	Peggy	Lex, O.S.U. Player	uncredited
1950	Where Danger Lives	Dr. James Mullenbach	
1950	The West Point Story	Officer-in-Charge	uncredited
1951	Call Me Mister	Marching Soldier	uncredited
1951	New Mexico	Private Clifton	uncredited
1951	People Will Talk	Student in Classroom	uncredited
1951	The Wild Blue Yonder	Lieutenant Jessup	
1951	Submarine Command	Lieutenant Paul Barton	alternative title: The Submarine Story
1952	Bronco Buster	The Photographer	uncredited
1952	No Room for the Groom	Will Stubbins	
1952	Red Ball Express	Private John Heyman	
1952	Sally and Saint Anne	Mike O'Moyne	
1953	The Redhead from Wyoming	Sandy	
1953	Gunsmoke	Curly Mather	
1953	Law and Order	Jed	
1953	Column South	Trooper Vaness	
1953	The Stand at Apache River	Hatcher	
1953	The Glass Web	TBC Engineer	uncredited
1954	Drive a Crooked Road	Harold Baker	
1954	Magnificent Obsession	First Mechanic	uncredited
1954	Stories of the Century	Clay Allison	episode: "Clay Allison"
1954	They Rode West	Lieutenant Raymond	
1954	Black Tuesday	Frank Carson	
1954	The Bamboo Prison	Slade	
1955	The Violent Men	De Rosa, Parrish Rider	
1955	Cult of the Cobra	Carl Turner	
1955	Double Jeopardy	Jeff Calder	
1955	The Night Holds Terror	Gene Courtier	
1955	To Hell and Back	Kerrigan	
1955	Frontier	Jubal Dolan	episode: "The Return of Jubal Dolan" and two other episodes
1956	Forbidden Planet	Jerry Farman	
1956	The Millionaire	Fred Graham	episode: "The Fred Graham Story"
1956	Julie	Jack	
1956	Canasta de cuentos mexicanos	Eddie Winthrop	segment: "Canasta"
1957	She Devil	Dan Scott	
1957	Taming Sutton's Gal	Jugger Phelps	
1957	Gunsmoke	Cam Durbin	episode: "Jealousy"
1957-1962	Maverick	Bart Maverick	83 episodes
1958	Sugarfoot	Bart Maverick	episode: "Price on His Head"
1958	Hong Kong Affair	Steven Whalen	
1961	A Fever in the Blood	Dan Callahan	
1962	FBI Code 98	Robert P. Cannon	
1963	Kraft Mystery Theatre	Sam Greenlee	episode: "Shadow of a Man"
1963	Kraft Suspense Theatre	Pete Braven	episode: "The Deep End"
1963	Wagon Train	Fenton Canaby	episode: "The Fenton Canaby Story"
1964	The Lucy Show	Detective Bill Baker	episode: "Lucy Makes a Pinch"
1965	Love and Kisses	Jeff Pringle	
1965	Kraft Suspense Theatre	Charles Glenn	episode: "Four Into Zero"
1965	Kraft Suspense Theatre	Tony Camion	episode: "Kill Me On July 20th"
1965	Chrysler Theatre	Fred Piper	Season 2.10 "Double Jeopardy"
1966	Batman	Jack O'Shea	2 episodes
1966	Laredo	Lance Mabry	"The Deadliest Kid in the West"
1966	Chrysler Theatre	Al Packer	episode; "Time of Flight"
1967	Run for Your Life	Harry Bevins	episode: "Baby, the World's on Fire"
1967	Chrysler Theatre	Det. Ray Baker	episode: "Deadlock"
1967	The High Chaparral	Doc Holliday	episode: "The Doctor from Dodge"
1967	Laredo	Bart Cutler/Frank Parmalee	"Enemies and Brothers"
1968	Commandos	Captain Valli	
1969	Young Billy Young	John Behan	
1971	Alias Smith and Jones	Dr. Chauncey Beauregard	episode: "Night of the Red Dog"
1974	McCloud	Manny Donner	episode: "This Must Be the Alamo"
1974	Lucas Tanner	Ted Lefferts	episode: "Look the Other Way"
1974	Banacek	Lou Wayne	episode: "Fly Me — If You Can Find Me"
1975	Ellery Queen	Attorney J.T. Latimer	episode: "The Adventure of the Lover's Leap"
1976	The Human Tornado	Captain Ryan	alternative title: Dolemite II
1976	Hawaii Five-O	Jim Spier	episode: "Let Death Do Us Part"
1976	The Bionic Woman	Charles Keys	episode: "Claws"
1977	Quincy, M.E.	Peter Devlin	episode: "Visitors in Paradise"
1977	The Rockford Files	Alex Kasajian, Ralph Steel	2 episodes: "The Becker Connection", "Beamer's Last Case"
1978	Vega$	Merle Ochs	episode: "High Roller"
1978	The Incredible Hulk	Tony Kelly	episode: "The Waterfront Story"
1978	Spawn of the Slithis	Radio Announcer	voice
1978	The Bionic Woman	Ray Fisk	episode: "The Martians Are Coming, the Martians Are Coming"
1978–1979	The Hardy Boys/Nancy Drew Mysteries	Harry Hammond / Helms	11 episodes
1979	B. J. and the Bear	Nichols	episode: "The Murphy Contingent"
1982	Bret Maverick	Bart Maverick	episode: "The Hidalgo Thing"
1983	The Fall Guy	Himself Dressed As Bart Maverick	episode: "Happy Trails"
1984	The Master	Brian Kirkwood	episode: "Kunoichi"
1991	The Gambler Returns: The Luck of the Draw	Bart Maverick	television movie
