= Ric Carrott =

American actor (1949–2025)

- Born: Richard Frowein Carrott; February 5, 1949
- Died: November 25, 2025 (aged 76)

Richard Frowein Carrott (February 5, 1949 – November 25, 2025) was an American actor who was active during the 1970s.

== life and career ==
Youthful-looking and handsome, Carrott's only regular television series role was as Captain Chris Gentry, on the Saturday morning children's series Space Academy, but he made guest appearances on numerous popular shows of the decade. These included Nanny and the Professor, The Partridge Family, Love American Style, Dirty Sally, The Bob Newhart Show, The Odd Couple, The Blue Knight, The Streets of San Francisco, Lucas Tanner, S.W.A.T., Cannon, and later The Rockford Files, Starsky and Hutch, Barnaby Jones, Fantasy Island and Three's Company.

Carrott originated the role of Chuck Cunningham, in the pilot for Happy Days (which aired as a segment of Love, American Style, "Love and the Happy Days"), later played by Gavan O'Herlihy in the series.

His film work includes roles in The Swinging Cheerleaders (also known as Locker Room Girls) (1974), Earthquake (1974), Slashed Dreams (1975), Mother, Jugs & Speed (1976), Marathon Man (1976), and the television movies A Summer Without Boys (1973), Hurricane (1974), SST: Death Flight (1977), and When Hell was in Session (1979).

Carrott died on November 25, 2025, at the age of 76.

== Filmography ==
Year	Title	Role	Notes
1973	A Summer Without Boys	Joe	TV movie
1974	Hurricane	Barker	TV movie
1974	The Swinging Cheerleaders (also known as Locker Room Girls)	Ross	
1974	Earthquake	National Guardsman	Uncredited
1975	Slashed Dreams	Marshall	
1976	Mother, Jugs & Speed	Harvey	
1976	Marathon Man	Plainclothesman #2	
1977	SST: Death Flight	Reporter	TV movie
1979	When Hell was in Session	Lt. Hadley	TV movie
