= Sunburst (film) =

- Directed by: James Polakof
- Written by: James Keach (writer); James Polakof (writer); David Pritchard (writer)
- Produced by: H. Kaye Dyal (co-producer); Jim Moloney (associate producer); Reginald Olson (associate producer); Ronald Peck (executive producer); James Polakof (producer); Donald Winchester (associate producer)
- Starring: Peter Hooten; Kathrine Baumann; Ric Carrott; Anne Lockhart; Robert Englund; Rudy Vallee; James Keach
- Cinematography: Erik Daarstad
- Edited by: John F. Link
- Music by: Ed Bogas
- Release date: 1975
- Running time: 74 minutes (US)
- Country: United States
- Language: English

Sunburst is a 1975 American thriller film directed by James Polakof. The film is also known as Slashed Dreams (American video title), and stars Peter Hooten, Kathrine Baumann, Ric Carrott, Anne Lockhart, Robert Englund and Rudy Vallee.

== Premise ==
A pair of students go on a trip up to the mountains to look for a former college friend who has dropped out to become a hermit, and encounter two rednecks who assault them.

== Cast ==
- Peter Hooten as Robert
- Kathrine Baumann as Jenny
- Ric Carrott as Marshall
- Anne Lockhart as Tina
- Robert Englund as Michael Sutherland
- Rudy Vallee as Proprietor
- James Keach as Levon
- David Pritchard as Danker
- Randy Ralston as The Pledge
- Susan McCormick as Susan
- Peter Brown as The Professor

== Soundtrack ==
- Roberta Van Dere - "Pretty Things" (Words and Music by Ed Bogas)
- Roberta Van Dere - "I'm Ready" (Words and Music by Ed Bogas)
- Roberta Van Dere - "Animals Are Clumsy Too" (Words and Music by Ed Bogas)
- Roberta Van Dere - "Take The Time" (Words and Music by Ed Bogas)
- Roberta Van Dere - "Mornin'" (Words and Music by Ed Bogas)
- Roberta Van Dere - "Theme From Sunburst" (Words and Music by Ed Bogas)

== See also ==
- List of American films of 1975
