= Merle Pertile =

American model and actress (1941–1997)

Playboy centerfold appearance
- January 1962
- Preceded by: Lynn Karrol
- Succeeded by: Kari Knudsen

Personal details
- Born: November 23, 1941 Whittier, California, U.S.
- Died: November 28, 1997 (aged 56) Lake Arrowhead, California, U.S.
- Height: 5 ft 5 in (165 cm)

Merle Pertile (November 23, 1941 – November 28, 1997) was an American model and actress. She was Playboy magazine's Playmate of the Month for its January 1962 issue.

== Biography ==
Pertile was born on November 23, 1941, in Whittier, California, and grew up in Indiana and Illinois. She attended and graduated from Hammond High School, Hammond, Indiana in 1959. Following graduation, she moved to Los Angeles, where she became a contract player with Universal Pictures and had guest spots on several TV shows. During the second season of the Playboy's Penthouse TV series (1960–61), Pertile became a regular cast member. It was there that she first met Hugh Hefner.

She was married to Jed S. Levitt, with whom she had a son, Krishna Joseph Levitt, and a daughter, Kenya Johanna Levitt. She also had a daughter, Christi, by actor Peter Brown. According to The Playmate Book, Pertile died on November 28, 1997, aged 56, in Lake Arrowhead, California, from complications following heart surgery.

== See also ==
- List of people in Playboy 1960–1969

Merle Pertile	Kari Knudsen	Pamela Gordon	Roberta Lane	Marya Carter	Merissa Mathes
Unne Terjesen	Jan Roberts	Mickey Winters	Laura Young	Avis Kimble	June Cochran
