= The Scavengers (1969 film) =

- Directed by: Lee Frost
- Written by: Bob Cresse
- Produced by: Wes Bishop; Bob Cresse
- Starring: John Bliss; Maria Lease; Michael Divoka; Roda Spain; John Riazzi; Wes Bishop
- Cinematography: Robert Maxwell
- Music by: Lee Frost; Paul Hunt
- Production company: Cresse-Frost Productions
- Distributed by: Aquarius Releasing
- Release date: 1969
- Running time: 94 min.
- Country: United States
- Language: English

The Scavengers (1969) is a Western war drama and exploitation film released in 1969 and rereleased as The Grabbers in 1970. It was directed by Lee Frost and stars John Bliss.

The film is set in the aftermath of the American Civil War. Renegade soldiers of the Confederate States Army fight against armed freedmen in a town of the American frontier.

== Plot ==
The film takes place in the period just after the American Civil War. Renegade Confederate soldiers take command of a frontier town, but after they molest a young black woman, a group of freedmen arm themselves and counterattack.

== Cast ==
- John Bliss as Capt. Steve Harris (as Jonathan Bliss)
- Maria Lease as Faith
- Michael Divoka as Sgt. Ward
- Roda Spain as Nancy
- John Riazzi as Carson
- Wes Bishop as Dillon
- Bruce Kimball as Jud
- Sanford Mitchell as Parker
- Tom Siegel as Bradley
- Jody Berry as Williams
- Paul Wilmoth as Cpl. Mason
- Uschi Digard as Lucile (as Ushi Digart)
- James E. McLarty as Mr. Marsh
