= The Swinging Cheerleaders =

1974 film by Jack Hill

- Directed by: Jack Hill
- Written by: Jack Hill (as Jane Witherspoon); David Kidd (as Betty Conklin)
- Produced by: John Prizer
- Starring: Jo Johnston; Rainbeaux Smith; Colleen Camp; Rosanne Katon
- Cinematography: Alfred Taylor
- Edited by: Mort Tubor
- Music by: William Allen Castleman; William Loose
- Production company: Centaur Pictures
- Distributed by: Centaur Releasing
- Release date: May 1974
- Running time: 91 minutes
- Country: United States
- Language: English
- Budget: $165,000

The Swinging Cheerleaders is a 1974 comedy-drama film written and directed by Jack Hill (who was credited for writing the film as Jane Witherspoon).

The film was released under the titles Locker Room Girls and H.O.T.S. II. It is the semi-sequel to the 1973 film The Cheerleaders, directed by Paul Glickler; and was itself followed by Revenge of the Cheerleaders (1976), directed by Richard Lerner; and The Great American Girl Robbery (1979) (aka Cheerleaders Wild Weekend), directed by Jeff Werner.

== Plot ==
In order to write an article for the Mesa University college newspaper on how cheerleading demeans women, Kate infiltrates the cheerleading squad. Only her boyfriend Ron knows about this. The other cheerleaders deal with their own problems: Mary Ann struggles to get her promiscuous football player boyfriend, Buck, to propose to her; Lisa is having an affair with statistics teacher Professor Thorpe; and Andrea debates whether or not to stay a virgin. Kate has an affair with Buck, about which her boyfriend Ron confronts her; Kate says it was for the article and she doesn't like Ron like before. They break up.

Kate insists Andrea have a one-night stand with a stranger. Andrea has sex with Kate's ex, Ron. She insists on having more so Ron invites over friends. After Andrea shows up at her ex's door, he beats up Ron. Meanwhile, Kate uncovers unscrupulous dealings: the football coach and college dean are rigging games to favor betting spreads that Professor Thorpe, who is also the bookie, arranges. Later, Prof. Thorpe turns against the coach and dean as they turn against their star quarterback, whom they want to convince to throw the game for a big payoff. When confronted, the quarterback refuses on principle and is arrested by university police, who plant a marijuana joint on him. The movie endorses defiance of authority, and questions the ideals of love and virginity.

== Cast ==
- Jo Johnston as Kate
- Rainbeaux Smith as Andrea
- Colleen Camp as Mary Ann
- Rosanne Katon as Lisa
- Ron Hajek as Buck
- Ric Carrott as Ross
- Jason Sommers as Professor Thorpe
- Ian Sander as Ron
- George D. Wallace as Mr. Putnam
- Jack Denton as Coach Turner
- John Quade as Belski
- Robert Lee Minor as Ryan
- Mae Mercer as Jessica Thorpe
- Dion Lane as Janie Hamilton
- Hank Rolike as The Bartender
- Fred Scheiwiller as Jerry
- Jodi Carlson as Other Cheerleader
- Gary Schneider as Jock At Party
- Sandy Dempsey as Girl At Tryouts
- Candy All as Girl At Tryouts

== Production ==
The Swinging Cheerleaders was shot in Pacific Palisades, California. According to co-writer/director Jack Hill, the film had a 12-day shoot. They started work on the script at the end of January 1974 and the movie was in theatres by May. The original title of the script was Stand Up and Holler, because, as Jack Hill later put it, "Actresses had a way of not wanting to be in a movie called The Swinging Cheerleaders."

== Reception ==
The Swinging Cheerleaders had a 30-theater opening on September 4, 1974, in the San Francisco exchange territory and grossed $101,855 in its first week. The film also had early success at drive-in theaters in cities such as Salt Lake City; Denver; Phoenix, Arizona; Auburn, Washington; and Portland, Oregon. It opened in 61 theaters in the New England area during the second week of September with 40 of those theaters reporting an estimated $130,000 in grosses.

The film was released again in 1981 as The Locker Room Girls and made $1,150,000.

Rick "Ojo" McGrath of Fcourt gave the film a positive review, writing: "The Swinging Cheerleaders reveals Jack at the top of his clever sexploitative form, giving us a solid story with characters both well developed and very well developed... This film was also very popular with young women, who no doubt went for its wacky blend of fairly realistic college adventures, including (oh no) the first streaker ever on film, some tasteful erotica, slapstick violence, party comedy and some melodrama. Lightweight entertainment with a dark edge is probably the ultimate descriptor here, proving that even for Jack, you don't have to be an intellectual heavy all the time."

== In popular culture ==
Randall Dale Adams and David Harris saw The Swinging Cheerleaders at a Dallas drive-in theater on November 28, 1976; it was the second of a double feature preceded by The Student Body (1976, directed by Gus Trikonis). Both men mentioned their attendance at the drive-in as part of their alibis while being investigated for the murder of Dallas Police Department Officer Robert W. Wood. In the Errol Morris documentary The Thin Blue Line, Adams claimed that he did not feel comfortable with the film's content, and so he and Harris left before it was finished. Clips from the film appear in The Thin Blue Line.
