= Kitten with a Whip =

1964 US crime drama film by Douglas Heyes

- theatrical release poster
- Directed by: Douglas Heyes
- Written by: Douglas Heyes; Whit Masterson
- Based on: Kitten with a Whip by Wade Miller
- Produced by: Harry Keller
- Starring: Ann-Margret; John Forsythe; Peter Brown; Patricia Barry; Richard Anderson
- Cinematography: Joseph F. Biroc
- Edited by: Russell F. Schoengarth
- Color process: Black and white
- Distributed by: Universal Pictures
- Release date: November 4, 1964 (U.S.)
- Running time: 83 minutes
- Country: United States
- Language: English

Kitten with a Whip is a 1964 American crime drama film directed by Douglas Heyes, who co-wrote the screenplay with Whit Masterson, a pseudonym for writers Robert Allison "Bob" Wade and H. Bill Miller, who also wrote the novel on which the film is based under the name Wade Miller. The film stars John Forsythe, Ann-Margret, Peter Brown, Patricia Barry and Richard Anderson.

The film was made to publicize Ann-Margret as a serious actress. Her previous films, Viva Las Vegas and Bye Bye Birdie, were of the musical genre and did little to highlight her dramatic skills. Her management signed her to several different films at this time, each with a top Hollywood studio, and she was not consulted on the projects they had chosen for her. In interviews, Ann-Margret made the best of the situation, claiming she was hoping to distance herself from her "new Marilyn Monroe" image.

Decades later, the film would be selected for riffing in a 1994 episode of Mystery Science Theater 3000. Kevin Killian's 2008 book of poetry Action Kylie features "Kitten with a Whip", a poem inspired by the film and featuring its two main characters.

== Plot ==
The wife of prospective politician David Stratton is away in San Francisco, visiting relatives there. David comes home one night but not to an empty house—a young woman, Jody, is asleep in his daughter's bed.

Jody has just escaped from a juvenile detention home, where she stabbed a matron and started a fire. Though David is furious and wishes to call the police, Jody tells him a tale of woe and he is sympathetic. He buys her a dress, gives her some money and puts her on a bus. Soon after, David learns that Jody is a wanted fugitive who had been lying to him. He returns home to find Jody there. She refuses to leave and threatens to create a scandal if he forces her out. Worried about his political fortunes, David is forced to let her stay.

Jody invites three friends to the house, including two ruffians, Ron and Buck, who bully David into letting them throw a wild party in the house. The youths begin to fight until Ron suffers a deep cut in the arm with a razor. They drive across the Mexico border, taking David along. They deposit Ron with a local doctor and ditch Buck when the car is entangled in barbed wire.

Jody and David end up in a Tijuana motel. When Ron and Buck return, a chase occurs and their car crashes, killing them both. David, seriously injured, awakens in the hospital to find that just before she died, Jody had told the authorities that she had been in the car with Ron and Buck, meaning that David is in the clear.

== Cast ==
- Ann-Margret as Jody Dvorak
- John Forsythe as David Stratton
- Peter Brown as Ron
- Patricia Barry as Vera
- Richard Anderson as Grant
- Skip Ward as Buck Vogel
- Diane Sayer as Midge
- Ann Doran as Mavis Varden
- Patrick Whyte as Phillip Varden
- Audrey Dalton as Virginia Stratton
- Leo Gordon as Police Sgt. Enders
- Patricia Tiara as a striptease dancer
- Nora Marlowe as Clara Eckhart
- Frances Robinson as Martha
- Maxine Stuart as Peggy
- Doodles Weaver as Salty Sam

== Production ==
The film is based on a novel by Wade Miller (the pen name of collaborators Bob Wade and Bill Miller). In September, 1959, Hedda Hopper stated that Mamie Van Doren had purchased the rights with the intent to produce and star in the film. In November, 1959, it was announced that Universal had the film rights and assigned Robert Arthur to produce. The following year, Richard Rush was reported to be developing the project, with Nancy Kwan cast in the starring role. However, the film did not materialize at the time.

When plans for a screen adaptation were revived, the lead role was originally offered to Brigitte Bardot, but she turned it down. In October 1963, Ann-Margret was announced as the star. She was paid $150,000 plus a percentage of the profits.

Filming started in December 1963, with Douglas Heyes as writer and director and Harry Keller as producer.

== Reception ==
New York Times reviewer Eugene Archer was critical of the film's premise, stating of Forsythe's character, "At almost any point in the proceedings he could have solved the problem—and ended the movie—by simply walking away and calling one of his influential friends." However, Archer praised Ann-Margret's performance: "With little help from Donald Heyes, who directed his own foolish script, she demonstrates enough untrained talent to suggest interesting dramatic possibilities in better films."

Writing in the Los Angeles Times, critic Margaret Harford decried the film's "violence-for-violence's sake" and wrote of the ending, "The problem was how to end it all and Heyes took the coward's way out. Everybody dies a violent death except Forsythe who goes back to his wife and will probably run for governor. There's a message here somewhere but I'm not going to work overtime figuring it out for you."

On the review aggregator website Rotten Tomatoes, 67% of 9 critics' reviews are positive. Filmink argued the film "has become a cult item due to its title, poster and Ann-Margret's balls-to-the-wall performance in the title role. This movie is much mocked but could have been a great little exploitation flick with 'Something to Say' – it has some good moments, a decent cast, a story full of potential, and a very charismatic star. However, it is let down by dopey scripting and Universal's (typical) scrimping on the budget."

Lindsay Lohan has called it one of her favorite films of all time, and even expressed interest in starring in a Gus Van Sant-helmed remake in 2007.

The film is listed in Golden Raspberry Award founder John Wilson's book The Official Razzie Movie Guide as one of the 100 Most Enjoyably Bad Movies Ever Made.

== See also ==
- List of American films of 1964
- List of films featuring home invasions
