= Policewomen (film) =

1974 film by Lee Frost

- Theatrical release poster
- Directed by: Lee Frost
- Written by: Wes Bishop; Lee Frost
- Produced by: Cirio H. Santiago; Jane Schaffer
- Starring: Sondra Currie; Tony Young; Phil Hoover; Elizabeth Stuart; Jean Bell
- Cinematography: Paul Hipp
- Distributed by: Crown International Pictures
- Release date: February 8, 1974
- Running time: 90 min.
- Country: United States
- Language: English
- Box office: $1 million

Policewomen is a 1974 action film about a female police officer who infiltrates an all-female criminal gang. The film was written and directed by Lee Frost, and stars Sondra Currie, Tony Young, and Phil Hoover.

Despite the fact that the story features only one female police officer, the film's title was pluralized and combined into a single word because the title Police Woman was already in use by an NBC television series starring Angie Dickinson, whose pilot was scheduled to premiere shortly after the film's release.

== Plot ==
Lacy Bond is a tough-as-nails police officer and martial arts expert who is recruited for a dangerous undercover assignment. A high-stakes criminal syndicate, led by a ruthless woman named Maude is smuggling gold out of the United States.

The investigation takes Bond from the streets of Los Angeles to various locales where she must infiltrate the gang's operation. Unlike many female-led films of the era, Bond is portrayed as physically superior to many of her male counterparts, utilizing Karate and tactical weaponry to neutralize threats. Along the way, she teams up with a fellow agent Frank Van Owen, though Bond remains the primary physical force of the operation.

The film's climax involves a violent confrontation at a remote estate where Bond must dismantle the smuggling ring and face Maude's enforcers in a final showdown.

== Cast ==
- Sondra Currie as Lacy Bond
- Tony Young as Lt. Frank Mitchell
- Phil Hoover as Doc
- Elizabeth Stuart as Maude
- Jean Bell as Pam Harris
- Laurie Rose as Janette
- William Smith as Karate Teacher
- Richard Schuyler as Pete Peterson
- Eileen Saki as Kim
- Wes Bishop as Raymond
- Susie Ewing as Laura (as Susan McIver)
- Steven Stewart as Fenwick
- Dorrie Thomson as Caroline
- Jody Daniels as Policeman (as Jody Daniel)
- Lee Frost as Catalina Attendant

== Production ==
Policewomen was part of a wave of "independent woman" action films released in the mid-1970s. It was directed by Bernie Hirschenson and written by producer John Lawrence. The film served as a breakout role for Sondra Currie, who performed many of her own stunts and martial arts sequences.

The film's score was provided by The Mike Curb Congregation, and the cinematography was handled by Robert Caramico, a veteran of low-budget exploitation cinema. The production utilized locations throughout Southern California, a hallmark of Crown International Pictures' cost-effective filming strategy.

== Critical reception ==
Contemporary reviews were generally dismissive, with critics often comparing it unfavorably to mainstream police procedurals. However, the film was a commercial success on the drive-in circuit, particularly in the Southern and Midwestern United States.

Throughout the late 1970s and 1980s, Policewomen became a staple of late-night television. Retrospective critics have noted that while the film contains many exploitation tropes, Lacy Bond's character was an early precursor to the "strong female lead" archetype later seen in 1980s action cinema.

== Home media ==
- VHS: Released in the 1980s by various labels including Prism Entertainment.
- DVD: The film was released on DVD by BCI Eclipse as part of their "Drive-In Movie Classics" series.
- Blu-ray: In 2022, Policewomen was given a 2K restoration and released on Blu-ray by the MVD Rewind Collection. This release included a new interview with Sondra Currie, where she discussed the film's cult legacy.

== See also ==
- List of American films of 1974
