= The Thing with Two Heads =

1972 film by Lee Frost

- Theatrical release poster
- Directed by: Lee Frost
- Written by: Lee Frost; Wes Bishop; James Gordon White
- Produced by: Wes Bishop; Jonathan Lawrence
- Starring: Ray Milland; Rosey Grier; Don Marshall; Roger Perry; Kathy Baumann; Chelsea Brown
- Cinematography: Jack Steely
- Edited by: Edward J. Forsyth
- Music by: Robert O. Ragland
- Distributed by: American International Pictures
- Release date: July 19, 1972
- Running time: 91 minutes
- Country: United States
- Language: English

The Thing with Two Heads is a 1972 American science fiction comedy film directed by Lee Frost and starring Ray Milland, Rosey Grier, Don Marshall, Roger Perry, Kathy Baumann, and Chelsea Brown.

== Plot ==
Dr. Maxwell Kirshner arrives at a mansion in a wheelchair; once inside, Kirshner asks if his experiment has been a success, and is told by an orderly that it has been. He is taken to the basement, where the experiment is in fact a two-headed gorilla that Dr. Kirshner has created. The experiment is to determine whether two heads can survive on a single body. Kirshner has done this because he has not much longer to live and wants to transplant his still living head from his lifeless body onto a donor so that he may continue living and continue working as the world's most successful surgeon.

Kirshner returns to his hospital institute to oversee an operation performed by his friend and associate doctor, Phillip Desmond. Kirshner returns to the basement and his two headed gorilla to remove one of the heads from its body. Kirshner orders his assistants to sedate his creature, but plans go awry when the creature is upset about the needle and knocks him out of his wheelchair, hurting him badly. The creature runs away and into a supermarket, chased by the assistants, where he is caught.

Kirshner hires a new doctor, Fred Williams, to help Desmond but when he discovers that Dr. Williams is African-American he tells Williams that he is no longer needed, to which Williams takes great offense.

Kirshner successfully removes the second head of the creature, and tells Desmond he is ready for his own transplant to a healthy donor. Desmond is not sure, until Kirshner tells him that the head that is now on the gorilla is in fact the second head he put on. He had successfully removed the original gorilla's head and replaced it with the second transplanted one.

Meanwhile, on death row, convicts are told that donating their bodies to science will save them from the electric chair. One convict is led to the chair - an African-American himself, named Jack Moss- and he decides to volunteer for the science experiment because he is innocent of the crime he was supposed to have committed. The police, including Sergeant Hacker, escort Jack to the transplant center for this experiment they have been told about. The doctors are surprised to see a large African-American being brought before them for this experiment, knowing full well that when Kirshner wakes up, he is not going to like what he sees. However, the doctors work around the clock to transplant Kirshner's head onto Jack's body.

After the operation, Kirshner wakes up, and Desmond tells him that the operation was a success. Desmond tells him that they had no other choice but to transplant his head onto the African-American's body, and that he would not have lived another day if they had not operated when they did.

At that moment, Jack awakens and is angry and disturbed that Kirshner's head is on his body and tries to get up from the table, but Kirshner cries out for someone to sedate Jack, which Desmond does. Desmond tells him that he will keep the Jack side heavily sedated all the time while Kirshner regains the power to move the body. Leaving Kirshner to rest, Desmond meets up with Dr. Williams again and tells him he needs his help. Williams is reluctant at first, but Desmond reassures him that his beliefs are not the same as Dr. Kirshner's and that his help is very much needed.

Meanwhile, a nurse comes to administer a sedative to Jack's side of the body. Jack tricks the nurse into thinking he is asleep, and then injects her with the sedative instead and escapes, taking Williams with him/them. Williams drives the car under gunpoint by Jack and Desmond chases after them. Jack asks Williams if he can remove Kirshner's head from his body. Jack takes over driving and accidentally crashes the car, resulting in a flat tire. Kirshner then tries to appeal to Williams by offering him the accolades he has received for performing a successful transplant. Williams refuses the offer, as it would mean the obligation to remove Jack's head.

Jack goes to his wife's house; Lila is not pleased to see him because of Kirshner's head on his body. While Jack is sleeping, Kirshner finds out that he can now control the body almost fully. Jack, Kirshner, Williams and Lila sit down for dinner. Lila asks what it will take to take Kirshner's head from Jack's body. Kirshner tells her that without a specially crafted surgical team, it is impossible to do the operation and both of them will die. Williams tells Kirshner that he is dead wrong about that, as the removal procedure is easily done without the aid of the surgical team.

Williams drives to a medical warehouse to get what he needs for the operation. Frightened by what Williams has told him, Kirshner manages to take over Jack's body and starts playing around with his face. Jack asks him to stop it and Kirshner knocks out Jack by punching him in the face. Cornered by William, Kirshner calls Desmond for help in removing Jack's head so that he may live. Kirshner manages to get away and drives back to the basement of his house. Before Kirshner can sedate Jack, Williams comes in and stops him. Williams then calls Desmond to get over to Kirshner's house as soon as possible. Desmond arrives with a nurse and an associate, who find Kirshner's detached head lying on the utensil table, hooked up to a heart and lung machine which keeps him alive. Kirshner calls to Desmond and begs for him to bring him another body.

Lila, Jack and Williams drive down the highway singing "Oh Happy Day."

== Cast ==
- Ray Milland as Dr. Maxwell Kirshner
- Rosey Grier as Jack Moss
- Don Marshall as Dr. Fred Williams
- Roger Perry as Dr. Philip Desmond
- Kathy Baumann as Patricia
- Chelsea Brown as Lila Moss
- John Dullaghan as Thomas
- John Bliss as Donald
- Jane Kellem as Miss Mullen
- Rod Steele as Medical Salesman
- Lee Frost as Sergeant Hacker
- Wes Bishop as Dr. Smith
- Jerry Butler as Black Prison Officer
- Rick Baker as Gorilla

== Production ==
The Thing with Two Heads is known for its soundtrack, produced by Michael Viner for MGM Records with a rotating cast of studio musicians whom he called the Incredible Bongo Band. The movie also features early work from makeup artist Rick Baker, a future Oscar winner.

== Release ==
The Thing with Two Heads was released in theatres on July 19, 1972. The film was released on DVD on June 5, 2001 and June 23, 2015.

== Reception ==
Variety called the film "slickly imaginative" and praised the "excellent special effects." Roger Ebert gave the film one star out of four, noting how lurid promotional material warned viewers the film was so shocking they risked heart attacks or strokes, but "The only first aid they really need is hot coffee for the patrons who doze off." Gene Siskel of the Chicago Tribune gave it two stars out of four, writing that after the operation, the thing "seems to exist only to be chased," adding, "Only the film's occasional humor keeps one in one's seat." Kevin Thomas of the Los Angeles Times called the film "every bit as preposterous as it sounds. It is also utterly hilarious, and any picture that can point up the absurdity and cruelty of racial prejudice with such incessant laughter deserves respect. Indeed, this American International release is a well-calculated, competently made exploitation picture that offers lots of fun." Tom Shales of The Washington Post wrote that it "isn't terrible" but, "As the title implies, The Thing with Two Heads can't make up its mind. It's a horror movie. It's a comedy movie. Neither breath mint nor candy mint, the picture never becomes quite horrifying or comic enough." Geoff Brown of The Monthly Film Bulletin wrote that the two lead actors both gave "convincing performances" but wished that the filmmakers had done more with the premise, finding that the extended chase sequence "takes too much attention away from the movie's extraordinary hero."

== In popular culture ==
- In the Moonlighting episode "Portrait of Maddie", David Addison responds to Maddie Hayes' exclamation of them having finally turned a profit with "The two of us? Together? Like Ray Milland and Rosey Grier in that awful movie?!"
- In The Venture Bros, the characters Dragoon and Red Mantle are fused in a similar manner. In the episode "A Very Venture Halloween", Dragoon wears blackface to a Halloween party in reference to the film, much to the displeasure of Red Mantle and the other guests.
- In the first act of the Justice League Unlimited episode "Divided We Fall", The Flash jokingly mentions the film to refer to the grotesque fusion between Lex Luthor and Brainiac.
- In The Simpsons episode "Treehouse of Horror XXIV", the plot of the "Dead and Shoulders" story borrows the premise from the film where Bart Simpson's head is grafted onto Lisa Simpson's body. It had previously been referenced at the end of "Treehouse of Horror II", in which Mr. Burns' head was grafted onto Homer Simpson's body at the end of the "If I Only Had a Brain" segment.

== See also ==
- The Incredible 2-Headed Transplant - An earlier film with a similar plot.
- List of American films of 1972
