= Sondra Currie =

American actress

- Currie in Bronk (1976)
- Born: January 11, 1952 (age 74)
- Education: Actors Studio
- Occupation: Actress
- Years active: 1970–present
- Spouses: Tony Young (m. 1976; div. 1986); Alan J. Levi (m. 1989)
- Relatives: Cherie Currie (sister); Marie Currie (sister)

Sondra Currie (born January 11, 1952) is an American actress. Currie is married to television and film director Alan J. Levi. As a couple, Currie and Levi co-produced the short film Take My Hand. The film was directed by Levi and written by actress Eileen Grubba. Currie starred alongside Grubba and Barbara Bain.

Currie is a lifetime member of the Actors Studio in West Hollywood, California. At the Actors Studio, Currie has trained under Martin Landau, Mark Rydell, Lou Antonio and Salome Jens. She also studied under Milton Katselas as a member of his Master Class for 17 years.

Sondra Currie remains active in the Los Angeles television, film and theatre scene as an actress, producer and arts-advocate. Currie's most recent film credits include producer-director Todd Phillips' The Hangover trilogy. Recent television credits include a recurring role in producer Tyler Perry's comedy series Love Thy Neighbor. Favorite stage credits include The Vagina Monologues, Death of a Salesman and After the Fall.

Currie was a founding member of Camelot Artists – now the Katselas Theatre Company – and is a member of the prestigious Theatre West. Currie served on the Board of the California Independent Film Festival and was a Jury Member for ten years. In 2008, Currie was invited to be a Juror at the first International Indie Film Festival in Sapporo, Japan, where Sondra was the sole woman on the panel.

Currie's sisters, identical twins Cherie and Marie Currie, are singers and also actresses. Cherie was, and is best known for being, the Runaways' frontwoman.

== Selected filmography ==
=== Films ===
Year	Title	Role	Notes
1970	Rio Lobo	Blackthorne Prostitute	Uncredited
1971	Scandalous John	Saloon Girl	
1972	Gabriella, Gabriella	Maggie, the redhead	
1974	Policewomen	Lacy Bond	
1974	Mama's Dirty Girls	Addie	
1975	Fugitive Lovers	Tara Alexander	
1975	Jessi's Girls	Jessica Hartwell	
1975	Teenage Seductress	Terry Nelson	
1980	The Last Married Couple in America	Lainy	
1982	Voyager from the Unknown	Agnes Spence	
1982	The Concrete Jungle	Katherine	
1986	The Education of Allison Tate	Pamela Tate	
1991	Joey Takes a Cab	Winnie	
1992	Illicit Behavior	Yolanda	
1996	Kid Cop	Edna Jacobs	Direct-to-video
2001	Mach 2	Courtney Davis	
2001	Kept	Natalie	
2002	Cottonmouth	Charlene Fannin	
2007	Lords of the Underworld	Barbara	
2009	The Hangover	Linda Garner	
2011	The Hangover Part II	Linda Garner	
2013	The Hangover Part III	Linda Garner	
2018	Take My Hand	Rose	Short film, also producer
2020	American Zombieland	Ecky	
2022	Unfinished Business	Marie Seabury	Short film

=== Television ===
Year	Title	Role	Notes
1971	Mannix	Miss Crawford	Episode: "Voice in the Dark"
1972	Michael O'Hara the Fourth	Secretary #1	TV film, uncredited
1972	Ironside	Cindy Love	Episode: "The Deadly Gamesmen"
1973	Adam-12	Betty Edwards	Episode: "Hollywood Division"
1974	The Odd Couple	Girl on Plane	Episode: "The Flying Felix"
1975	Kolchak: The Night Stalker	Vicky	Episode: "Legacy of Terror"
1975	Police Woman	Reyne	Episode: "Don't Feed the Pigeons"
1976	Bronk	Rose	Episode: "Jailbreak"
1976	Starsky and Hutch	Marsha Stearns	Episode: "Tap Dancing Her Way Right Back into Your Hearts"
1977	79 Park Avenue	Melissa	3 episodes
1977	The Bob Newhart Show	Nora Dubois	Episode: "A Girl in Her Twenties"
1977, 1981, 1984	Three's Company	Arlene Price / Shelley Green / Sherry Lee	3 episodes
1978	Eight Is Enough	Sharon	Episode: "Hard Hats and Hard Heads"
1978	CPO Sharkey	Madeleine	Episode: "Sharkey's Back Problem"
1978	The Incredible Hulk	Stephanie	Episode: "747"
1978	Greatest Heroes of the Bible	Rahab	Episode: "Joshua & Jericho"
1980	Barnaby Jones	Ruby	Episode: "Murder in the Key of C"
1981	The Misadventures of Sheriff Lobo	Sandy	Episode: "The Girls with the Stolen Bodies"
1981	Sanford	Miss Pender	Episode: "To Keep a Thief"
1982	Voyagers!	Agnes Spence	Episode: "Voyagers"
1982	Knight Rider	Francesca Morgan	Episode: "Not a Drop to Drink"
1982, 1988	Simon & Simon	Claire Hipple / Harriet Pullbrook	2 episodes
1983	Tales of the Gold Monkey	Phyllis Shoemate	Episode: "Cooked Goose"
1983	Magnum, P.I.	Wanda Martine, Princess of Turbia	Episode: "The Big Blow"
1984	Scene of the Crime		Episode: "Pilot/The Babysitter"
1984	Airwolf	Diana Norris / Gloriana	Episode: "Mind of the Machine"
1985	Misfits of Science	Sherri	Episode: "Sonar... and Yet So Far"
1985	New Love, American Style		2 episodes
1985	Rituals	Margo Field	Unknown episode
1986	The Golden Girls	Margaret Spencer	Episode: "Big Daddy's Little Lady"
1987	The Law & Harry McGraw	Sylvia	Episode: "She's Not Wild About Harry"
1988	Diamonds		Episode: "Separate Ways"
1988	Probe	Tish	Episode: "Plan 10 From Outer Space"
1989	The Return of Sam McCloud	Rachel	TV film
1989	Peaceable Kingdom		Episode: "Moonstruck"
1990	Columbo: Murder in Malibu	Mrs. Rocca	TV film
1991	Columbo: Columbo and the Murder of a Rock Star	Sgt. Hubach	TV film
1991	They Came from Outer Space	Sylvia Vincent	Episode: "Hair Today, Gone Tomorrow"
1991	Days of Our Lives	Interior Decorator	Episode 6615
1992	Murder, She Wrote	Carol Kendall	Episode: "Angel of Death"
1992	Cheers	Katherine Gaines	Episode: "Ill-Gotten Gaines"
1994	RoboCop	Janet Lewis	Episode: "Provision 22"
1994	Alien Nation: Dark Horizon	Teri Cloth	TV film
1995	The Secretary	Mary Quinn	TV film
1995	Family Matters	Sharon	Episode: "Wedding Bell Blues"
1995	The Cosby Mysteries	Sheila Chadwick	Episode: "The Medium Is the Message"
1998	Touched by an Angel	Anne	Episode: "Only Connect"
2000	JAG	Angela Ritter	Episode: "Real Deal SEAL"
2001	The Perfect Wife	Nora Toling	TV film
2001	The Fugitive	Dr. Hammend	Episode: "Smith 282"
2002	The Bold and the Beautiful	Dr. Whitney	Episode 3761
2003	ER	Dottie Shroeder	Episode: "A Little Help from My Friends"
2003	7th Heaven	Judge Lanzo	Episode: "It's Not Always About You"
2005	Thicker Than Water	Sally	TV film
2006	NCIS	Lillian Hencheck	Episode: "Bloodbath"
2009	The Secret Life of the American Teenager	Eunice Johnson	Episode: "The Summer of Our Discontent"
2009	Mental	Judy DelCarlo	Episode: "Pilot"
2010, 2013	The Reel Housewives of Theatre West	Sondra	3 episodes
2011	Chemistry	Olivia Delacourt	Episode: "Flesh Wounds"
2013	Love Thy Neighbor	Vivian	4 episodes
2016	Supernova 45	General Tai	TV film, also known as Ganymede Pan
2020	Trailerville USA		2 episodes, also producer
2021	The Stephen Savage Show	Guest	
2023	Mrs. Davis	Sister Bonnie	2 episodes
