= Teenage Seductress =

- Theatrical Release Poster
- Directed by: Chris Warfield
- Screenplay by: Chris Warfield; George Buck Flower; John F. Goff
- Produced by: Chris Warfield
- Starring: Sondra Currie; Chris Warfield; Elizabeth Saxon; John Trujillo; Sonny Cooper; Gwen Van Dam Michelle D’Agostin; Claudia Smillie
- Cinematography: Joseph Bardo
- Edited by: Rudolph Cusumano
- Music by: John Barber
- Distributed by: Vineager Syndrome
- Release date: January 1, 1975
- Running time: 86 minutes
- Country: United States
- Language: English

Teenage Seductress is a 1975 American drama film filmed in Taos, New Mexico. It was directed by Chris Warfield, and co-written by Warfield, George Buck Flower and John F. Goff. The film stars Sondra Currie and Warfield.

The film follows a young woman who enacts an elaborate plan of revenge against her estranged father, a famous author, by seducing him. However, things do not go as planned when she becomes torn between a charismatic art gallery owner and her own father, with whom she begins developing romantic feelings for. Although the title and premise alludes to it being a teensploitation film, the main character is an adult in her 20s.

== Plot ==
Terry Nelson, born Emily King, is visiting Taos, New Mexico to see the father who abandoned her, famous author Preston King, but she does not know where he lives. After Preston left his family when Terry was two years old, her mother, also named Emily, began resenting men and constantly berated her daughter for saying that her father loves her and for having a boyfriend as a teenager. Terry eventually grows up resenting her father, and formulates a plan to find him, to seduce him into an incestuous relationship, and to finally humiliate him as revenge for abandoning her.

At an art gallery, she meets the owner, Reynaldo "Reggie" Gonzales, who offers to take her to Preston's house. When Preston arrives, Terry, under the guise of being a journalism student, meets him and gets him to talk to her about writing. Preston steps away for a moment to walk out his maid Elena, but when he comes back, he finds Terry nude on his bed. He is uncomfortable and rejects her, but then forgives her.

In town, Terry is invited to a party Reggie is having and he tells her that Preston might attend. Terry also runs into Elena at the grocery store and usurps her duties by snatching the groceries away and lies to her about Preston hiring her as a secretary. At Preston's house, Terry begs him to hire her as a secretary, and he takes the offer. Victoria Hughes, Preston's girlfriend, arrives and is shocked to see Terry there.

Preston asks her to go to Reggie's party and represent them. At the party, Reggie and Terry flirt, but the conversation becomes somber when she tells him that she was raped by a friend of her father when she was 13, and he consoles her and they kiss. Terry pries information about Preston and Victoria from Reggie.

Terry continues to date Reggie, and they go for a picnic nearby where she intends to spy on Preston and Victoria who are also present. After getting Reggie to leave, Terry watches the couple make out, and then uses a fake injury to get Preston's attention and disrupt the couple. Victoria sees right through Terry's plot when Preston starts neglecting her, so Preston makes it up to her by inviting her to his house for a romantic dinner. Reggie brings Terry's car from the shop. Preston invites them both to come inside for martinis. Victoria tries to convince Preston of what's going on, but Preston brushes it off.

Terry pushes Elena out by doing all of her job duties and she quits by making up a story about her family. Victoria confronts him about Terry again, and in a heated argument they break up. Terry moves into a guest room at Preston's, and they start spending more time together. Terry asks Preston about the wife and daughter he had, and he says they split because they were really young. He also mentions that he paid child support until she turned 18, but had not seen her since she was two, saying that his attorney said that it would be best to stay out of her life. Terry tells Preston about her father abandoning them, to which he tells her he can't imagine her father not wanting to see her. The two begin holding hands in public as they grow romantically attracted to one another. Preston finishes his novel, and tells Terry that he won't be writing for another couple months, but invites her to stay on if she wants to.

Terry delivers some paintings to the gallery for Preston. Reggie is apprehensive about her, but Terry kisses him. Preston comes in and sees them, and he storms away angrily. Back at Preston's house, Terry and Preston reconcile. The two succumb to their feelings for each other and finally have sex. An emotional Terry goes to the bathroom where she hallucinates her mother saying that she should complete her revenge on Preston by telling him the truth. She goes back and angrily lashes at Preston, revealing that she is his estranged daughter Emily and that he just had sex with his own daughter. Preston is horrified at what he hears and asks why she did this, which she refuses to share as she berates him.

This turns out to be a scenario envisioned by Terry, who is still in the bathroom contemplating on what to do next. Having found empathy with Preston, she decides to not reveal the truth to her father and tells him that she loves him before they sleep together. Terry wakes up in the middle of the night, quietly packs her things, and whispers her father goodbye before she leaves Preston and his home while he is asleep.

== Cast ==
- Sondra Currie as Terry Nelson / Emily King
  - Michelle D’Agostin as Terry, aged 2
  - Claudia Smillie as Terry, aged 9
- Chris Warfield as Preston King
- Elizabeth Saxon as Victoria Hughes
- John Trujillo as Reggie Gonzales
- Sonny Cooper as Elena
- Gwen Van Dam as Emily Cobb

== Production ==
The film was shot in Taos, New Mexico.

== Home media ==
On April 4, 2015, Teenage Seductress was released on DVD as part of a drive-in double feature with another movie, 1973's Little Miss Innocence, which had the same director, Chris Warfield.

== Reception ==
Third Eye Cinema praised the film, saying it was a "surprisingly respectable acting turn from director Warfield himself". 10kbullets critic, George Pacheco, praised Sondra Currie's performance, saying, "the actress’ natural, ravishing beauty projecting itself in every scene and stealing the show." Daily Grindhouse's critic, Jason Coffman, gave a negative review, saying the film "plays out mostly like a bleak soap opera."
