= Kathrine Baumann =

American fashion designer, actress, model

- Education: Bowling Green State University
- Occupations: Fashion designer; model; actress
- Years active: 1971-1988 (as actress)
- Known for: 99 and 44/100% Dead
- Title: Miss Ohio 1969

Kathrine Baumann is an American actress, model, and couture handbag designer. She established Kathrine Baumann Beverly Hills (KBBH), an haute-couture accessory and handbag collection.

== Early life and education ==
Baumann grew up in Independence, Ohio. She was a cheerleader in high school, and in 1966 was named Miss Independence. Kathrine is a 1971 graduate of Bowling Green State University, Bowling Green, Ohio.

== Career ==
Kathy Lynn Baumann was "Miss Cleveland" in the 1968 Miss USA-World Pageant prior to becoming Miss Ohio 1969. At the 1970 "Miss America Pageant" (held in September, 1969) Baumann became first runner-up to Miss America winning both talent and swimsuit awards. Her talent presentation consisted of a space travel gymnastic routine to "Those Were the Days." (The Moon landing was still fresh in everyone's minds, having occurred only a few months prior to the pageant.) She later traveled to Vietnam as part of USO with Bob Hope to entertain the troops.

Baumann became an actress, and guest-starred on a variety of television shows, including season 2 M*A*S*H as Nancy Sue Parker in the 1974 episode entitled 'Henry In Love', The Tonight Show Starring Johnny Carson, Knight Rider, Simon & Simon, The Fall Guy, Banacek, Fantasy Island, Trapper John, M.D., CHiPs, The Dukes of Hazzard, Vegas and several movies of the week. Her film credentials include a co-starring role with Richard Harris and Chuck Connors in 99 and 44/100% Dead (1974), and roles in Chrome and Hot Leather (1971), The Thing with Two Heads (1972), The Take (1974) and Slashed Dreams (1975).

== Kathrine Baumann Beverly Hills ==
In 1988, Baumann founded K. Baumann Design in Beverly Hills, California (now known as Kathrine Baumann Beverly Hills), where she designs luxury evening bags (minaudieres) and other women's accessories. The handbags were made in California and Italy.

Her designs includs cartoon characters and well-known product logos in her fashion designs. She designed a Titanic-shaped minaudiere, which was carried to events surrounding the release of the 1997 feature film.

Baumann created several seasons of her Americana Collection and characters such as Betty Boop, Mickey and Minnie Mouse, Miss Piggy, Barbie and Ms. Green M&M were made into crystal-encrusted minaudieres.

In 2001 Baumann sued a group of retailers in Manhattan who were selling unauthorized copies of her designer handbags.

Her work was included in a fashion exhibit at Stephens College.

== Filmography ==
=== Film ===
Year	Title	Role	Notes
1971	Evel Knievel	Sorority Girl #2	Biographical film
1971	Chrome and Hot Leather	Susan (as Kathy Baumann)	Action film
1972	The Thing with Two Heads	Patricia (as Kathy Baumann)	Science fiction film
1974	The Take	James' Girl (as Kathy Bauman)	Action crime film
1974	99 and 44/100% Dead	Baby	Action adventure film
1975	Sunburst	Jenny	Horror film

=== Television ===
Year	Title	Role	Notes
1973	The Great American Beauty Contest	Melinda Wilson (as Kathy Baumann)	TV film
1973	Letters from Three Lovers	Girl at Pool	TV film
1974	M*A*S*H	Nancy Sue Parker	Episode: "Henry in Love"
1974	Banacek	Gloria Barker	Episode: "Now You See Me, Now You Don't"
1974	Rural Doctor	Sue Ellen McKendrick	Episode: "A Time to Grow"; Episode: "Survival"
1974	Apple's Way	Nurse	Episode: "The Accident"
1975	Harry O	Betsy	Episode: "For the Love of Money"; Episode: "The Confetti People"; Episode: "Sounds of Trumpets"
1975	Death Among Friends	Carol	TV film
1976	McCloud	Eunice	Episode: "Our Man in the Harem"
1976	Switch	Kathy	Episode: "Come Die with Me"
1977	Flight to Holocaust	Sheila Waters	TV film
1979	Dallas Cowboy Cheerleaders	Ginny O'Neil	TV film
1979	CHiPs	Sorrell	Episode: "Roller Disco: Part 1"; Episode: "Roller Disco: Part 2"
1979	The Dukes of Hazzard	Sally (as Kathrine Bauman)	Episode: "Arrest Jesse Duke"
1980	The Misadventures of Sheriff Lobo	Erika	Episode: "Treasure of Nature Beach"
1980	Trapper John, M.D.	Mrs. Sheldon	Episode: Girl Under Glass: Part 1"; Episode: "Girl Under Glass: Part 2"
1981	Fantasy Island	Kathi Fox (as Katherine Baumann)	Episode: "High Off the Hog/Reprisal"
1981	Enos	Sgt. Parton	Episode: "The House Cleaners"
1980–1981	Vegas	Ann (as Katherine Baumann); Katy Hedrick	Episode: "Consortium"; Episode: "Seek and Destroy"
1981	B.J. and the Bear	Gypsy (as Katherine Baumann)	Episode: "Who Is BJ?"
1981	Border Pals	Corporal Juliet Marais	TV film
1982	Terror at Alcatraz	Sally	TV film
1982	Rooster	Amy Hammond	TV film
1982	Simon & Simon	Rhonda Fairbanks	Episode: "Sometimes Dreams Come True"
1981–1984	The Fall Guy	Marylou; Virginia Carly	Episode: "The Fall Guy"; Episode: "The Winner"
1985	Knight Rider	Tyler Jastrow (as Katherine Baumann)	Episode: "Knight Strike"
1988	Ohara	Deirdre Lynn	Episode: "Last Year's Model"
