= Eileen Saki =

Japanese-American actress (1943–2023)

- Born: Minako Eileen Sasaki; November 18, 1943; Jerome, Arkansas, U.S.
- Died: May 1, 2023 (aged 79); Los Angeles, California, U.S.
- Occupation: Actress
- Years active: 1972–2016
- Notable work: M*A*S*H; Splash
- Spouse: Bob Borgen

Minako Borgen (November 18, 1943 – May 1, 2023), born Minako Eileen Sasaki and known by her acting name Eileen Saki, was a Japanese-American actress.

Minako Sasaki was born at the Jerome War Relocation Center in Arkansas in 1943 during the World War II incarceration of Japanese Americans. She was later transferred to the camp at Tule Lake.

Borgen was the final and longest-running actress to play Rosie, proprietor of Rosie's Bar in the television series M*A*S*H. She also had a small but memorable role in the season 5 premiere episode as the head Madam of a coquettish group of prostitutes. The switching of actresses in the role of Rosie mimics the actual handing over of the real-life Rosie's Bar during the Korean War from mother to daughter. Alan Alda became aware of this when he received a letter in the early 1980s from the real Rosie Jr. about the incident, a copy of which is published in the book The Last Days of M*A*S*H, written by Alan and Arlene Alda.

== Death ==
Saki died from pancreatic cancer in Los Angeles on May 1, 2023, at the age of 79.

== Filmography ==
Year	Title	Role	Notes
1974	Policewomen	Kim	
1979	Meteor	Siberian Woman	
1981	History of the World, Part I	Slave - The Roman Empire	
1984	Splash	Dr. Fujimoto	
