= Rooster (film) =

1982 television film directed by Russ Mayberry

- Genre: Drama
- Written by: Glen A. Larson; Paul Williams
- Directed by: Russ Mayberry
- Starring: Paul Williams; Pat McCormick; J. D. Cannon; Ed Lauter; Jill St. John; Kathrine Baumann
- Music by: Stu Phillips
- Country of origin: United States
- Original language: English

Production
- Executive producer: Glen A. Larson
- Cinematography: Chuck Arnold (as Charles G. Arnold)
- Editor: David Howe
- Running time: 85 minutes
- Production companies: 20th Century Fox Television; Glen A. Larson Productions; Tugboat Productions

Original release
- Network: ABC
- Release: August 19, 1982

Rooster is a 1982 made-for-television film starring Paul Williams and Pat McCormick who were reunited after their pairing in the Smokey and the Bandit movies. Rooster is an unsold television pilot written and produced by Glen A. Larson for 20th Century Fox Television and broadcast as a two-hour movie on ABC on August 19, 1982, and was rebroadcast on July 24, 1983.

== Plot summary ==
A physically small police psychologist (Paul Williams) and a physically large insurance detective (Pat McCormick) team up on an arson case.

== Cast ==
- Paul Williams as Rooster Steele
- Pat McCormick as Sweets McBride
- J. D. Cannon as Chief Willard T. Coburn
- Ed Lauter as Jack Claggert
- Jill St. John as Joanna Van Eegan
- Delta Burke as Laura DeVega
- Kathrine Baumann as Amy Hammond
- Charlie Callas as Francis A. Melville
- Henry Darrow as Dr. Sanchez
- Pamela Hensley as Bunny Richter
- Lara Parker as Janet
- William Daniels as Dr. DeVega
- John Saxon as Jerome Brademan
- Eddie Albert as Rev. Harlan Barnum
- Marie Osmond as Sister Mae Davis
- Dan Pastorini as Himself
- Dusty Baker as Himself
- Jerry Reuss as Himself
- Mike Scioscia as Himself

== Follow-ons ==
Rooster Steele and Sweets McBride, played by Paul Williams and Pat McCormick, would reappear in "How Do I Kill Thee...Let Me Count the Ways" episode of The Fall Guy in 1983.
