= Chrome and Hot Leather =

1971 American action film

- Theatrical release poster
- Directed by: Lee Frost
- Produced by: Wes Bishop
- Starring: William Smith; Michael Haynes; Peter Brown; Marvin Gaye; Michael Stearns; Kathy Baumann; Larry Bishop
- Cinematography: Lee Frost
- Music by: Porter Jordan
- Production company: Wes Bishop-Lee Frost Production
- Distributed by: American International Pictures
- Release date: September 29, 1971
- Running time: 91 minutes
- Country: United States

Chrome and Hot Leather is a 1971 American action revenge film about Green Berets vs. bikers with touches of comedy. It is one of two films to feature singer Marvin Gaye in an acting role, the other being the 1969 film The Ballad of Andy Crocker.

== Plot ==
When the fiancée of a US Special Forces Vietnam Veteran sergeant is killed by bikers, he and three fellow Green Berets ride out for revenge.

== Cast ==
- William Smith as T.J.
- Tony Young as Mitch
- Michael Haynes as Casey
- Peter Brown as Al
- Marvin Gaye as Jim
- Michael Stearns as Hank
- Larry Bishop as Gabe
- Kathrine Baumann as Susan (as Kathy Baumann)
- Wes Bishop as Sheriff Lewis
- Herb Jeffries as Ned
- Bobby Pickett as Sweet Willy (as Bob Pickett)
- George Carey as Lieutenant Reardon
- Cheryl Ladd as Kathy
- Dan Haggerty as Bearded Biker
- Erik Estrada (uncredited)
- Ann Marie as Helen
- Robert Ridgely as Sergeant Mack
- Lee Frost as Motorcycle Salesman

== See also ==
- List of American films of 1971
