= Red Nightmare =

1962 American propaganda short film

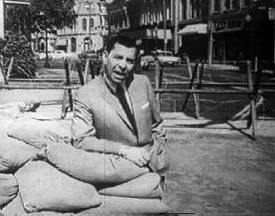
- Jack Webb introducing Red Nightmare
- Directed by: George Waggner
- Written by: Vincent Fotre
- Produced by: William L. Hendricks; Jack Webb
- Starring: Jack Kelly; Jeanne Cooper; Peter Brown; Pat Woodell
- Narrated by: Jack Webb
- Cinematography: Robert Hoffman
- Edited by: Folmar Blangsted
- Music by: Howard Jackson; William Lava
- Distributed by: Warner Bros.
- Release date: 1962
- Running time: 29 minutes/60 minutes (1985 video release)
- Country: United States
- Language: English

Red Nightmare is the best-known title of the 1962 Armed Forces Information Film (AFIF) 120, Freedom and You. Produced for and financed by the Department of Defense, the short film served as an anti-communist informational piece during the Cold War. It was later released on American television and distributed to schools under the title Red Nightmare.

The film is a Cold War-era drama short subject directed by George Waggner, narrated by Jack Webb and starring Jack Kelly and Jeanne Cooper.

== Historical context and purpose ==
The Cold War has been described as a battle for the hearts and minds of American citizens, and cinema played a significant role in shaping the narrative. The United States Government used propaganda films during the Cold War to influence public perception and ideology against communism and the Soviet Union. During the Cold War, the U.S. and the Soviet Union both feared an actual war on a nuclear scale due to the devastation and mass casualties that would result. No matter which Superpower started a nuclear war, it would invariably fail because the other side would retaliate by using its nuclear weapons, and both sides would end up being destroyed. In this era of nuclear deterrence due to Mutual assured destruction, nuclear weapons were wielded for their deterrent purpose, not for actual use.

In propaganda films such as Red Nightmare, American democracy, liberty, and prosperity are depicted as desirable ideals, contrasted with negative portrayals of the Soviet Union and Communism.

== Plot ==
In a typical American town, barbed wire, barricades and soldiers in Soviet uniforms are shown. Narrator Jack Webb explains that there are several places behind the Iron Curtain used for training Soviet espionage and sabotage forces prior to infiltrating America.

The Donovans are a typical American family consisting of father Jerry, mother Helen and daughter Linda, whose boyfriend Bill has been invited to dinner. Jerry is missing a PTA meeting to go bowling, and he intends to skip his Army Reserve training, which upsets Helen. Linda and Bill inform Jerry and Helen that they wish to marry, but Jerry replies they are too young and should wait five years.

Jerry awakens to find meetings in the public square about infiltrating America to bring down capitalism. He returns home to find his daughter going to a farm collective escorted by Bill, who is now in a Soviet Army uniform. Helen informs Jerry that he will have to address the PTA on the glories of communism, which Jerry refuses to do, but his wife says that he has no choice. At work, Jerry's foreman tells him that he has not met his quota and must work through the lunch break to meet it.

On Sunday morning, Jerry wakes to find his two youngest children being sent to a state-run communist school against his wishes. He insists that the children attend Sunday school and takes them to their church, which has been converted into a museum glorifying the Soviet Union, including many inventions made by Americans that the Soviets claim to have invented. Jerry knocks the exhibits over and is arrested by troops led by a commissar.

Jerry is brought to trial at a Soviet tribunal, where there is no jury nor defense attorney. Jerry demands to know the charge against him. After condemning testimony from several witnesses, including his own wife, Jerry is convicted and sentenced to death. When he is strapped into the execution chair, Jerry makes a speech about the Soviet people awakening one day to overthrow communism before he is shot in the head by the commissar (offscreen).

Jerry wakes to his freedoms and apologizes to Bill and Linda. Bill says that Jerry was right about waiting to get married and that he and Linda will do so after he finishes his enlistment in the United States Army.

== Themes ==
The central themes in Red Nightmare include fears of a communist takeover in the United States and negative portrayals of the Soviet Union. The film suggests that American freedoms are vulnerable if citizens become complacent, framing communism as an immediate threat to the American way of life.

Red Nightmare presents American democratic values, such as liberty and civic responsibility in positive terms and incorporates themes of espionage, betrayal, political paranoia, and concerns about communist infiltration.

== Cast ==
- Jack Kelly as Jerry Donavan
- Jeanne Cooper as Helen Donavan
- Peter Brown as Bill Martin
- Pat Woodell as Linda Donavan (as Patricia Woodell)
- Andrew Duggan as Judge
- Peter Breck as Russian Officer
- Robert Conrad as Pete, one of Jerry's co-workers
- Mike Road as Prosecutor
- Jack Webb as On-Camera Narrator

== Production ==
Initial reports that Freedom and You (the original title) would be made first appeared in April 1962.

The film's production is similar to that of episodes of The Twilight Zone. It was made by Warner Bros. under the auspices of the Department of Defense Directorate of Armed Forces Information and Education under the direct supervision of Jack L. Warner. The film features stars of Warner Bros. Television shows of the time. Jack Kelly was the co-lead of Maverick, and other cast members appeared in Warner Bros. shows that aired on the ABC network.

Webb described the nightmare part of the film as the dramatization of a variety of stories told by refugees from Eastern Europe who fled the Soviet expansion following World War II.

Red Nightmare was released on American television on Jack Webb’s GE True program on the CBS network in 1962.

== Distribution ==
Rhino Video released the film on videocassette in 1985 under the title The Commies Are Coming, the Commies Are Coming. Red Nightmare is currently available to watch through YouTube and the Internet Archive.
