= Commandos (film) =

1968 film by Armando Crispino

- Directed by: Armando Crispino
- Screenplay by: Lucio Battistrada; Armando Crispino; Stefano Strucchi; Dario Argento
- Story by: Don Martin; Artur Brauner
- Based on: A short story by Menahem Golan
- Produced by: Alfonso Sansone; Artur Brauner
- Starring: Lee Van Cleef; Jack Kelly; Joachim Fuchsberger; Götz George
- Cinematography: Benito Frattari
- Edited by: Daniele Alabiso
- Music by: Mario Nascimbene
- Production companies: P.E.C.; C.C.I.; CCC Film
- Distributed by: Columbia Filmgescellschaft mbH
- Release dates: 19 November 1968 (Italy); 8 August 1969 (West Germany)
- Running time: 112 minutes
- Countries: Italy; West Germany

Commandos a.k.a. Sullivan's Marauders is a 1968 Italian-produced war film starring Lee Van Cleef and Jack Kelly and directed by Armando Crispino. The film is set in North Africa but was shot in Sardinia.

Dario Argento is credited as co-screenwriter.

== Plot ==
The film is set in the middle of World War II, and in the deserts of Africa, Sgt. Sullivan puts together a group of Italian-Americans into disguise as Italian soldiers in order to infiltrate a North African camp held by the Italians. Sullivan, along with Dino, was one of three that survived from the Pacific War against the Japanese, although Lieutenant Freeman was killed in his last mission. Their Captain in charge of the mission, Captain Valli, has several soldiers with special training.

Sullivan thinks Valli is too green and doubts his leadership, while Valli worries that Sullivan is too blood thirsty and stubborn. Valli refuses to kill all the enemy Italians and they have to be kept hidden as various supply convoys pass through.

Later, Germans arrive and spend time talking, asking questions, and drinking.

Eventually the Italians try to escape.

== Cast ==
- Lee Van Cleef as Sgt. Sullivan
- Jack Kelly as Captain Valli
- Giampiero Albertini as Aldo
- Marino Masé as Italian Lt. Tomassini
- Götz George as Oberleutnant Rudi
- Pier Paolo Capponi as Corbi
- Romano Puppo as Dino
- Ivano Staccioli as Rodolfo, Radio Man
- Marilù Tolo as Adriana
- Joachim Fuchsberger as Oberleutnant Heitzel Agen (called "Professor")
- Heinz Reincke as Unteroffizier Hans
- Helmut Schmid as Sergeant Miller
- Otto Stern as Sergeant Braumann
- Pier Luigi Anchisi as Riccio
- Gianni Brezza as Marco
- Duilio Del Prete as Bruno

== Release ==
Commandos was released in Italy on 19 November 1968. It was released in West Germany as Himmelfahrtskommando El Alamein in several cities on 8 August 1969.

== Reception ==
In a contemporary review in the Monthly Film Bulletin, Richard Comb commented that the conclusion of the film was "the kind of meaningless apocalyptic moment much favoured when international producers get together to meditate over mutual insanity in war", and that Commandos was "rife with such rhetoric, interspersed with all the action cliches of the war movie and fitfully jerking its line with type"

== See also ==
- Euro War
