= Peter Brown (actor) =

American actor (1935-2016)

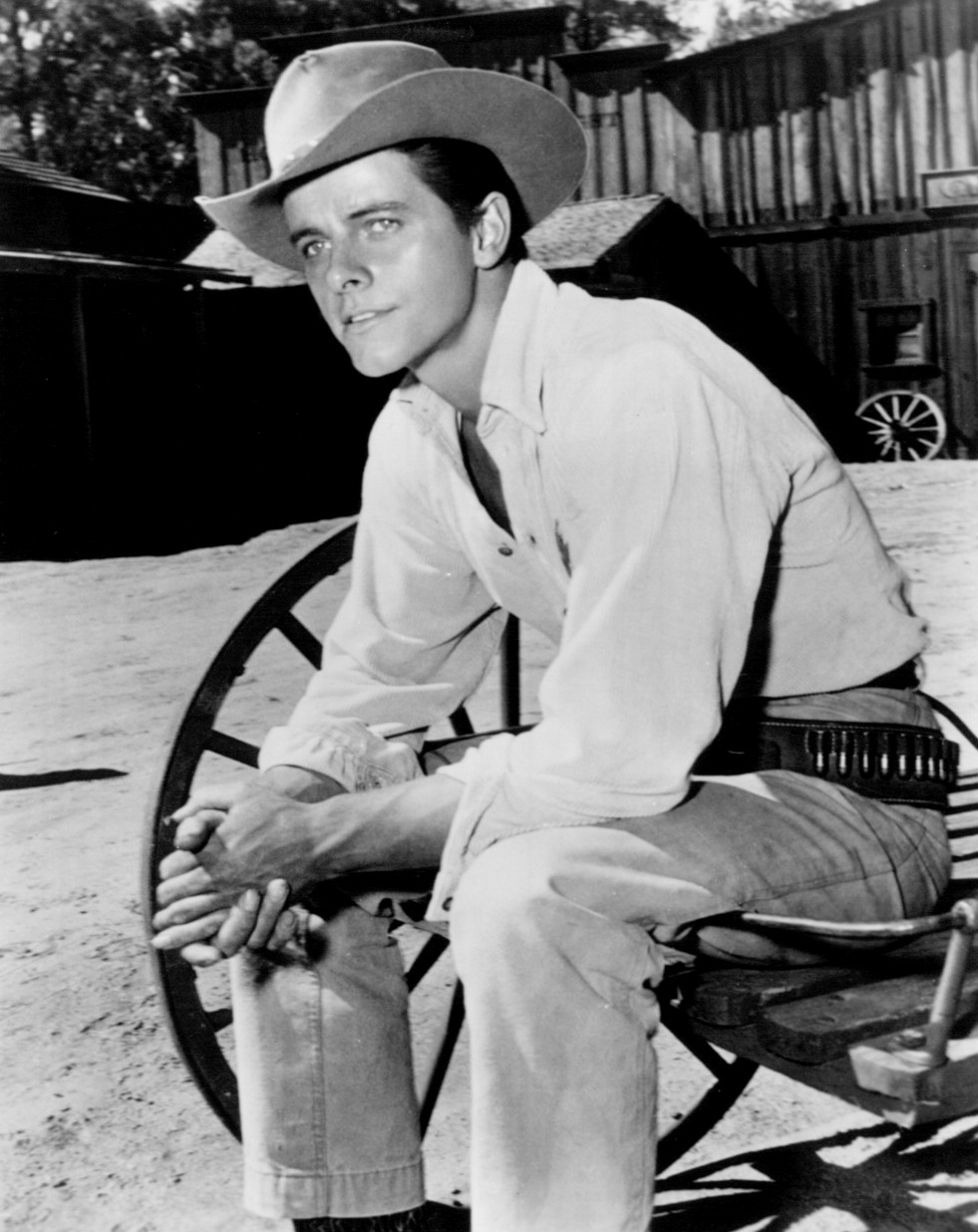
- Brown as Deputy Johnny McKay in the television series Lawman (1959)
- Born: Pierre Lynn de Lappe; October 5, 1935; New York City, NY, U.S.
- Died: March 21, 2016 (aged 80); Phoenix, Arizona, U.S.
- Education: University of California, Los Angeles
- Occupation: Actor
- Years active: 1957–2005
- Spouses: Diane Jergens (m. 1958; div. 1960) Sandy Edmundson (m. 1964; div. 1969) Liliane Alice Yvette Safargy (m. 1971; div. 1974) Mary Kathleen Gauba (m. 1986; div. 1999) Kerstin Kern (m. 2008–2016)
- Children: 3

Pierre Lynn de Lappe (October 5, 1935 – March 21, 2016), also known as Peter Brown, was an American actor. He portrayed Deputy Johnny McKay opposite John Russell as Marshal Dan Troop in the 1958 to 1962 ABC-Warner Brothers western television series Lawman and Texas Ranger Chad Cooper on NBC's Laredo from 1965 to 1967.

== Early life ==
Brown served in Alaska with the U.S. Army's 2nd Infantry Division where he entertained his fellow troops by writing, directing, and acting in plays.

Following discharge, he supported himself by working in a gasoline station on the Sunset Strip. One night a man paid for his purchase with a credit card reading "Jack L. Warner". Brown asked the customer whether he was one of the Warner Brothers, the man replied "I'm the last one left".

== Career ==
As a contract player for Warner Bros., Brown appeared in the theatrical film Darby's Rangers (1958) with James Garner and Stuart Whitman. He also appeared in the 1962 films Merrill's Marauders, which was co-written and directed by Samuel Fuller starring Jeff Chandler, and Red Nightmare with Jack Kelly.

=== Lawman ===
Brown portrayed deputy Johnny McKay in Lawman.

=== Maverick ===
Brown appeared in dozens of other television shows and did several crossovers with other western series as Johnny McKay, including Maverick, in the 1961 episode "Hadley's Hunters". He also appeared on Maverick playing different characters in the 1957 episode "Point Blank" (as Clay Semple) and "Stage West", playing a villain named Rip Fallon.

=== Cheyenne ===
In 1957 Brown appeared as Clay Conover in Cheyenne in the episode "Top Hand." In 1958 he appeared as Billy Younger in Cheyenne in the episode "Ghost of the Cimarron." In the Cheyenne episode "Renegades" (1958), Brown portrayed Jed Wayne.

=== Colt .45 ===
Brown twice guest-starred in another ABC/WB western, Colt .45, with Wayde Preston. He appeared as Dave in "The Peacemaker" or "Judgment Day", the series premiere in 1957. That same season, he was cast as Jimmy Benedict in the episode "Young Gun".

=== Post-Warner Bros. ===
After his contract with Warner Bros. lapsed, Brown made two films for Walt Disney Studios; Summer Magic with Hayley Mills and Burl Ives and A Tiger Walks. He appeared in other television series too, such as Redigo, starring Richard Egan as a New Mexico rancher.

After appearing opposite Ann-Margret in Kitten with a Whip, he was contracted to Universal Pictures for the 1965 NBC Western television series Laredo, set on the Mexican border in and about Laredo, Texas.

Brown appeared in the pilot for Police Woman, starring Angie Dickinson. Brown appeared in several exploitation films such as Foxy Brown, Chrome and Hot Leather, and Act of Vengeance.

=== Soap operas ===
Brown also appeared on several soap operas. On Days of Our Lives, he played Dr. Greg Peters from 1972-1979 who was involved in a romance with Amanda Howard (Mary Frann). He was Laurie Brooks' attorney, Robert Laurence, on The Young and the Restless (1981-1982) when she was on trial for the murder of her former mother-in-law, Vanessa Prentiss. He would return briefly to "Y&R" in between soap stints in the late 1980s.

Brown replaced John Shearin as Roger Forbes on Loving during its early days, but was written out after only a couple of months. From 1986-1987, he played Charles Sanders, former ambassador to Mendorra, on One Life to Live. The character had a heart attack and died on the evening of his wedding to Lee Halpern. He subsequently played Blake Hayes on The Bold and the Beautiful, the ex-husband of Dr. Taylor Hamilton Hayes.

== Personal life ==
Brown was married five times. His wives were:

- Diane Jergens, an actress; they wed on September 6, 1958, in Las Vegas and divorced in June 1960.
- Sandy Edmundson, a model; they wed on May 26, 1964, in Palos Verdes and divorced in 1969. They had a son.
- Liliane Alice Yvette Safargy, a model; they wed on November 14, 1971, in Beverly Hills and divorced in September 1974.
- Mary Kathleen Gauba, they wed on November 29, 1986, in Santa Fe and divorced in 1999.
- Kerstin Kern; they wed on September 6, 2008, in Newbury Park, California.

Brown had three children as follows:

- Matthew, born 1965, by Sandy Edmundson
- Joshua, by Amber Karlson, with whom Brown lived from 1974 until 1979.
- Christi, by Merle Pertile.

He died on March 21, 2016, from Parkinson's disease, age 80.

== Filmography ==
Film credits
Year	Title	Role	Notes
1957	The Story of Esther Costello	Boy in Airport	Uncredited
1957	Sayonara	2nd Military Policeman	Voice, Uncredited
1957	Freedom and You	Bill Martin	Edited to half an hour and rereleased in 1962 as Red Nightmare
1958	Darby's Rangers	Private / Corporal Rollo Burns	
1958	Too Much, Too Soon	Young Nightclub Patron	Uncredited
1958	Marjorie Morningstar	Alec	Uncredited
1958	Violent Road	Marine Corporal	Uncredited
1958	No Time for Sergeants	Radio Disc Jockey	Voice, Uncredited
1958	Onionhead	Clark	(scenes deleted)
1959	Westbound	Army Sentry Outside Tent	Voice, Uncredited
1959	The Young Philadelphians	Airline Ticket Agent / Elevator Operator	Voice, Uncredited
1959	The FBI Story	FBI Agent at Hearting	Voice, Uncredited
1962	Merrill's Marauders	Bullseye	
1963	Summer Magic	Tom Hamilton	
1964	A Tiger Walks	Vern Goodman	
1964	Ride the Wild Surf	Chase Colton	
1964	Kitten with a Whip	Ron	
1968	Three Guns for Texas	Texas Ranger Chad Cooper	Episodes of Laredo TV series made into a feature film
1969	Backtrack	Texas Ranger Chad Cooper	Episodes of Laredo TV series made into a feature film
1970	Eagles Attack at Dawn	Abie	Israeli film
1971	Chrome and Hot Leather	Al	
1971	Teenage Tease		
1972	Piranha, Piranha	Jim Pendrake	
1973	Gentle Savage	-	Executive producer
1974	Foxy Brown	Stevie Elias	
1974	Memory of Us	Winston	
1974	Act of Vengeance	Jack	
1975	Slashed Dreams	The Professor	
1976	Sparkle	-	Executive producer
1982	The Concrete Jungle	Danny	
1986	The Aurora Encounter	Sheriff	
1986	The Messenger	Harris	
1990	Deathstone	Admiral	
1995	Karate Tiger 8: Fists of Iron	Max	
1997	Asylum	Dr. Frank Meyers	
1999	Wasteland Justice	Wilkerson	
2001	The Wedding Planner	Justice	
2004	Y.M.I.	Glenn	
2004	Land of the Free?	Senator Jacobs	
2004	Hollywood, It's a Dog's Life	Hank O'Hara	
2005	Three Bad Men	Tom Noland	
2005	Hell to Pay	Johnny Behan	(final film role)

Television credits
Year	Title	Role	Notes
1957	Colt .45	Jimmy Benedict / Dave	2 episodes
1957–1960	Maverick	Deputy Johnny McKay / Rip Fallon in the episode: "Stage West"/ Chris Semple	3 episodes
1957–1962	Cheyenne	Ross Andrews-Pocketful Of Stars ... Billy Younger [Ep:"Ghost of the Cimarron"] Jed Wayne [Ep: Renegades] Clay Conover - [Ep: Top Hand] (4 episodes)	
1958–1959	Sugarfoot	Deputy Johnny McKay / Davey Reeder	2 episodes
1958–1962	Lawman	Deputy Johnny McKay	156 episodes
1962	Hawaiian Eye	Teo	Episode: "Lalama Lady"
1962	77 Sunset Strip	Trace Morgan / Timmy Ellison	2 episodes
1963	The Gallant Men	Lieutenant Hodges	Episode: "The Bridge"
1963	The Alfred Hitchcock Hour	Ed	Season 1 Episode 17: "Forecast: Low Clouds and Coastal Fog"
1963	The Alfred Hitchcock Hour	Detective Philip Reardon	Season 1 Episode 32: "Death of a Cop"
1963	Redigo	Johnny Porter	Episode: "The Blooded Bull"
1963–1964	Wagon Train	Ben Campbell / Aaron Balfour / Benedict O'Brien	3 episodes
1964	Kraft Suspense Theatre	Chris Forrester / Lieutenant Ben Hollister	2 episodes
1964–1967	The Virginian	Tom Conlan / Chad Cooper / Craig Ryan	3 episodes
1965–1967	Laredo	Chad Cooper	56 episodes, three of which are a credit only. Credited as Chad Cooper/Prince Lazlo in "A Prince of a Ranger" (1966)
1967	The Danny Thomas Hour	Eddie Kimble	Episode: "The Enemy"
1969	The Best Years	Dempster	Made-for-television movie
1969	Mod Squad	Lou Franklin	Episode: "The Debt"
1970	Hunters Are for Killing	Raymond Pera	Made-for-television movie
1970	The Most Deadly Game	Scott Norton	Episode: "War Games"
1971	My Three Sons	Mike Turley	Episode: "The Love God"
1971	Dan August	Fred Bowers	Episode: "The Manufactured Man"
1971	Mission: Impossible	Johnny Brown	Episode: "Blind"
1971	O'Hara, U.S. Treasury	Special Agent Bart Herron	Episode: "Operation: Spread"
1972	Medical Center	Dr. Musante	Episode: "Deadlock"
1972	The Bob Newhart Show	Stan Conners	Episode: "Tennis, Emily?"
1972–1978	Days of Our Lives	Dr. Greg Peters	10 episodes
1973	The Magician	Ray Weaver	Episode: "The Vanishing Lady"
1974	Police Story	Chuck / Lloyd	2 episodes
1975	Marcus Welby, M.D.	Mike Ross	Episode: "The Covenant"
1975	Matt Helm		Episode: "Dead Men Talk", Episode: "Murder on Ice"
1975	Police Woman	Paul Monarch	Episode: "Above and Beyond"
1977	The Streets of San Francisco	Officer Brady	Episode: "One Last Trick"
1977	Quincy M.E.	Bondine - College Football Coast	Episode: "Main Man"
1978	Wonder Woman	Inspector Tim Bolt	Episode: "Hot Wheels"
1978	Charlie's Angels	Mark Correll	Episode: "Angels Ahoy"
1978	Vega$	Richie	Episode: "The Pageant"
1978	The Eddie Capra Mysteries		Episode: "Breakout to Murder"
1978	Flying High	Richard	Episode: "Brides and Grooms"
1979	Salvage 1	Bill Kelly	Episode: "Salvage" (pilot)
1979	Project U.F.O.	Steve Rollins	Episode: "Sighting 4026: The Atlantic Queen Incident"
1979	California Fever	Woods	Episode: "Beach Wars"
1980	The Dukes of Hazzard	Floyd Baker	Episode: "Officer Daisy Duke"
1980	Top of the Hill	McCain	Made-for-television movie
1980	The Girl, the Gold Watch & Everything	Bodyguard	Made-for-television movie
1981	Fantasy Island	Patrick O'Herlihy	Episode: "Elizabeth's Baby/The Artist and the Lady"
1981	The Misadventures of Sheriff Lobo	Hijacker Thompson	Episode: "Airsick - 1981"
1982	Dallas	Tom Flintoff	Episode: "Denial"
1982	Magnum, P.I.	Robert Brighton	Episode: "Heal Thyself"
1983	Hart to Hart	Ray Martin / Dr. Scott	Episode: "As the Hart Turns"
1983	Loving	Roger Forbes	
1983	T.J. Hooker	Lieutenant Drummer	2 episodes
1983	Manimal	Carl McGhan	Episode: "High Stakes"
1984	Whiz Kids	Androv	Episode: "Father's Day"
1984	Cover Up	Mark Reynolds	Pilot episode
1984	The Fall Guy		Episode: "San Francisco Caper"
1984	Riptide	Fred Cushing	Episode: "Peter Pan Is Alive and Well"
1984–1986	Simon & Simon	Manny Crobett / FBI Agent Frank Kenniman	2 episodes
1985	Crazy Like a Fox		Episode: "Till Death Do Us Part"
1985	Knight Rider		Episode: "Knight Behind Bars"
1986	Airwolf	Herb Waldron	Episode: "Little Wolf"
1986	The A-Team	Ted Burke	Episode: "The Theory of Revolution"
1986–1987	One Life to Live	Charles Sanders, III	Featured Role
1988	Ohara	Austin Snyder	Episode: "Last Year's Model"
1988	Aaron's Way	Coach Grady	Episode: "New Patterns"
1988	1st & Ten: The Championship	Mal Hutchins	Episode: "Caught in the Draft"
1989	Hunter	Fuller	Episode: "Partners"
1989	Generations	Doctor	4 episodes
1989–1991	The Young and the Restless	Robert Laurence	6 episodes
1990	Baywatch	Bucky	Episode: "Shark Derby"
1991–1992	The Bold and the Beautiful	Blake Hayes	146 episodes
1992	Wings	Dr. Lasker	Episode: "Noses Off"
1994	One West Waikiki	Mr. Dineheart	Episode: "Along Came a Spider"
1997	Babylon 5	Minister	Episode: "Intersections in Real Time"
2000	JAG	Bill Layton	Episode: "Real Deal SEAL"
2001	Disney's California Adventure TV Special		Made-for-television movie

1981 Care Care Central- Host
