= Dixie Dynamite =

1976 film

- Theatrical release poster
- Directed by: Lee Frost
- Starring: Warren Oates; Christopher George; Jane Anne Johnstone; Kathy McHaley
- Music by: Jerry Styner; Porter Jordan
- Distributed by: Dimension Pictures
- Release date: 1976
- Country: USA
- Language: English

Dixie Dynamite is a 1976 American film directed by Lee Frost that stars Warren Oates. Steve McQueen appears uncredited in a scene as a motorbike driver.

== Plot ==
A man who makes liquor illegally from a still is in cahoots with the sheriff, who then double crosses him. The moonshiner is shot dead by the sheriff's deputy. His two daughters decide to take over the family business, but when the sheriff and a corrupt local banker disrupt their operation and eventually destroy their still, the girls, aided by local motocross rider Mack, decide to get even.

== Cast ==
- Warren Oates as Mack
- Christopher George as Sheriff Marsh
- Jane Anne Johnstone as Dixie
- Kathy McHaley as Patsy
- R. G. Armstrong as Charlie White
- Stanley Adams as Dade McCrutchen
- Mark Miller as Tom Eldridge
- Wes Bishop as Deputy Frank

== Soundtrack ==
- The soundtrack is by Jerry Styner and Porter Jordan, with music performed by Duane Eddy and the Mike Curb Congregation

== Home video ==
- Dixie Dynamite was released on DVD on January 29, 2002 as a Region 1 disc by Vci Mod.
