= James Garner filmography =

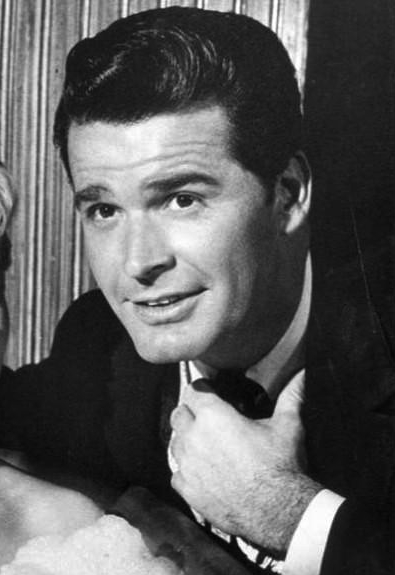
Garner in 1958

American actor and producer James Garner (1928–2014) rose to prominence as a contract player for Warner Bros. in the 1957 television show Maverick as the series initial lead character Bret Maverick. He would continue to be associated with the Maverick brand several times in his career, as his original character Bret Maverick in the 1978 television film The New Maverick, briefly in the series Young Maverick (1979), and the series Bret Maverick (1981–1982). He also appeared in the 1994 film Maverick, with Mel Gibson portraying the role of Maverick. In addition to a lengthy career in film, Garner was best known for his long-running series The Rockford Files.

== Film ==
Year	Title	Role	Notes	Ref.
1956	Toward the Unknown	Major Joe Craven		
1956	The Girl He Left Behind	Preston		
1957	Shoot-Out at Medicine Bend	Sergeant John Maitland		
1957	Sayonara	Captain Mike Bailey, USMC		
1958	Darby's Rangers	William Orlando Darby		
1959	Up Periscope	Lieutenant (j.g.) Kenneth M. Braden		
1960	Cash McCall	Cash McCall		
1961	The Children's Hour	Dr. Joe Cardin		
1962	Boys' Night Out	Fred Williams		
1963	The Great Escape	Flight Lieutenant Bob Hendley / "The Scrounger"		
1963	The Thrill of It All	Dr. Gerald Boyer		
1963	The Wheeler Dealers	Henry Tyroon		
1963	Move Over, Darling	Nick Arden		
1964	The Americanization of Emily	Lieutenant Commander Charles Edward Madison		
1965	36 Hours	Major Jefferson Pike		
1965	The Art of Love	Casey Barnett		
1966	A Man Could Get Killed	William Beddoes		
1966	Duel at Diablo	Jess Remsberg		
1966	Mister Buddwing	Mr. Buddwing		
1966	Grand Prix	Pete Aron		
1967	Hour of the Gun	Wyatt Earp		
1968	How Sweet It Is!	"Grif"		
1968	The Pink Jungle	Ben Morris		
1969	The Racing Scene	Himself	Documentary	
1969	Support Your Local Sheriff!	Jason McCullough		
1969	Marlowe	Philip Marlowe		
1970	A Man Called Sledge	Luther Sledge		
1971	Support Your Local Gunfighter	Latigo Smith		
1971	Skin Game	Quincy Drew / Captain Nathaniel Mountjoy		
1972	They Only Kill Their Masters	Abel Marsh		
1973	One Little Indian	Corporal Clint Keyes		
1974	The Castaway Cowboy	Lincoln Costain		
1980	Health	Harry Wolff		
1981	The Fan	Jake Berman		
1982	Victor/Victoria	King Marchand		
1984	Tank	Sergeant Major Zack Carey		
1985	Murphy's Romance	Murphy Jones		
1988	Sunset	Wyatt Earp		
1990	Take Me to Your Leaders	The Narrator	Documentary	
1992	The Distinguished Gentleman	Jeff Johnson		
1993	Fire in the Sky	Frank Watters		
1993	Return to The Great Escape	Himself / Flight Lieutenant Bob Hendley / "The Scrounger"	Documentary short film	
1994	Maverick	Marshal Zane Cooper		
1996	Wild Bill: Hollywood Maverick	Himself	Documentary	
1996	My Fellow Americans	President Matt Douglas		
1997	The Hidden Dimension	The Narrator		
1998	Twilight	Raymond Hope		
2000	Space Cowboys	Captain Reverend "Tank" Sullivan		
2001	Atlantis: The Lost Empire	Lyle Rourke (voice)	This is the only Disney animated film Garner participated in as a member of the voice cast.	
2002	Divine Secrets of the Ya-Ya Sisterhood	Shepard James "Shep" Walker		
2003	The Land Before Time X: The Great Longneck Migration	Pat (voice)		
2004	The Notebook	Older Noah "Duke" Calhoun		
2004	Al Roach: Private Insectigator	Al Roach		
2007	The Ultimate Gift	Howard "Red" Stevens		
2007	Battle for Terra	Doron (voice)		
2010	Superman/Shazam!: The Return of Black Adam	Shazam (voice)		

== Television ==
Year	Title	Role	Notes	Ref.
1955	Cheyenne	Lieutenant Brad Forsythe	Pilot episode: "Mountain Fortress"	
1956	Zane Grey Theater	Lieutenant Jim Collins	Episode: "Star Over Texas"	
1956	Cheyenne	Lieutenant Lee Rogers	Episode: "Decision"	
1956	Cheyenne	Bret	Episode: "The Last Train West"	
1956–1957	Conflict	"Red" / Jim Curtis	3 episodes	
1957	Sugarfoot	Bret Maverick	Episode: "Misfire"	
1957	Cheyenne	Willis Peake	"Episode: War Party"	
1957–1961	Maverick	Bret Maverick / Beau "Pappy" Maverick	124 episodes	
1958	The Pat Boone Chevy Showroom	Himself		
1958	Wide Wide World	Himself	Episode: "The Western"	
1958	This Is Your Life	Himself	Episode: "James Garner"	
1960–1964	The Bob Hope Show	Himself	3 episodes	
1961	Angel	Jim	Episode: "The French Lesson"	
1971	Once Upon a Wheel	Himself	Documentary	
1971–1972	Nichols	Sheriff Frank Nichols	24 episodes	
1974	Backlash of the Hunter	Jim Rockford	Television film, pilot for The Rockford Files	
1974–1980	The Rockford Files	Jim Rockford	122 episodes; director of episode: "The Girl in the Bay City Boys Club"	
1978	The New Maverick	Bret Maverick	Television film	
1979	Young Maverick	Bret Maverick	Episode: "Clancy"	
1980	Waylon	Himself	TV special	
1981–1982	Bret Maverick	Bret Maverick	18 episodes	
1982	The Long Summer of George Adams	George Adams	Television film	
1984	Heartsounds	Harold Lear	Television film	
1984	The Glitter Dome	Sergeant Aloysius Mackey	Television film	
1985	Space	Senator Norman Grant	Miniseries	
1986	Promise	Bob Beuhler	Hallmark Hall of Fame; also executive producer	
1989	My Name Is Bill W.	Dr. Bob Holbrook Smith	Television film; also executive producer	
1990	Decoration Day	Albert Sidney Finch		
1991–1992	Man of the People	Councilman Jim Doyle	10 episodes	
1993	Barbarians at the Gate	F. Ross Johnson	Television film	
1994	Breathing Lessons	Ira Moran	Television film	
1994	HBO First Look	Himself / Bret Maverick	Documentary; episode: "Maverick"	
1994	100 Years of the Hollywood Western	Himself	Documentary television film	
1994	The Rockford Files: I Still Love L.A.	Jim Rockford	Television film; also executive producer – uncredited	
1995	The Rockford Files: A Blessing in Disguise	Jim Rockford	Television film; also executive producer	
1995	Streets of Laredo	Woodrow F. Call	Mini-series	
1996	The Rockford Files: If the Frame Fits...	Jim Rockford	Television film	
1996	The Rockford Files: Godfather Knows Best	Jim Rockford	Television film	
1996	The Rockford Files: Friends and Foul Play	Jim Rockford	Television film; also executive producer	
1996	The Rockford Files: Punishment and Crime	Jim Rockford	Television film; also executive producer	
1997	The Rockford Files: Shoot-Out at the Golden Pagoda	Jim Rockford	Television film; also executive producer	
1997	Dead Silence	FBI Special Agent John Potter	Television film	
1998	Legalese	Norman Keane	Television film	
1999	Century of Country	Host	Miniseries (13 episodes)	
1999	The Rockford Files: If It Bleeds... It Leads	Jim Rockford	Television film	
1999	One Special Night	Robert Woodward	Television film	
2000	The Last Debate	Mike Howley	Television film	
2000	Chicago Hope	Hubert "Hue" Miller	4 episodes	
2000	Biography	Himself	Episode: "James Garner: Hollywood Maverick"	
2000–2001	God, the Devil and Bob	God (voice)	13 episodes	
2001	Mark Twain's Roughing It	Elderly Samuel Clemens / Mark Twain	Mini series	
2002	First Monday	Chief Justice Thomas Brankin	13 episodes	
2003–2005	8 Simple Rules	Jim Egan	45 episodes	
2005	James Garner On-Camera Interview: Rockford Files Season 1	Himself / Jim Rockford	DVD Documentary Short	
2006	The Trail of Tears: Cherokee Legacy	Himself	Video	
2011	Pioneers of Television	Himself / Jim Rockford / Bret Maverick	Documentary; episode: "Crime Dramas"	
2013	The Ultimate Life	Howard "Red" Stevens	Sequel to The Ultimate Gift	

== Bibliography ==
- Abbott, Jon (2009). Stephen J. Cannell Television Productions: A History of All Series and Pilots. McFarland. ISBN 978-0-7864-5401-3.
- Garner, James; Winokur, Jon (2011). The Garner files. Waterville, Me. : Thorndike Press; Detroit : Gale, Cengage Learning. ISBN 978-1-4104-4337-3.
- Strait, Raymond (1985). James Garner. New York, NY : St. Martin's Press. ISBN 978-0-312-43967-5.
