= Slang abbreviation =

Euphemism

Slang abbreviation is the practice of referring to an offensive word, usually by its first letter followed by the word "word". Abbreviated slang is often used for politeness or decency. Some common examples are below.

- The "F word" most commonly refers to fuck. The abbreviation has occasionally been used to mean feminism.
- The "L word" has been used to refer to the words lesbian or love. The L Word, an American-Canadian television series, uses the abbreviation in its title to refer to the show's LGBTQ theme.
