= Tony Young (actor) =

American actor (1937–2002)

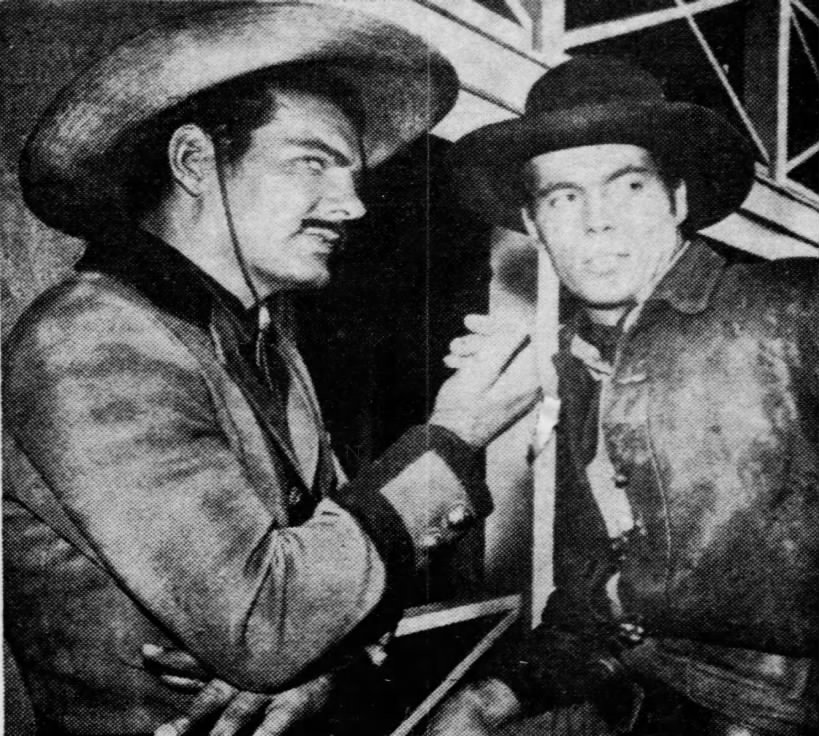
- Young (right) with Charles H. Gray, 1961
- Born: Carleton Leonard Young; June 28, 1937; New York, U.S.
- Died: February 26, 2002 (aged 64); West Hollywood, California, U.S.
- Education: Los Angeles City College
- Occupations: Film and television actor
- Years active: 1959–1993
- Spouses: Connie Mason (m. 1958; div. 1962) Madlyn Rhue (m. 1962; div. 1970) Sondra Currie (m. 1976; div. 1986)
- Children: 1
- Parent: Carleton G. Young (father)

Carleton Leonard Young (June 28, 1937 – February 26, 2002) was an American film and television actor. He was known for playing Cord in the American western television series Gunslinger.

== Life and career ==
Young was born Carleton Leonard Young in New York, the son of Barbara Davis and Carleton G. Young, a film, radio and television actor. He and his family moved to Hollywood, California in 1943. He attended University High School, Fairfax High School, and Los Angeles City College, where he learned about drama and play management. He served in the United States Air Force.

While serving in the military, Young worked for the American Forces Network, as he directed, produced and wrote for the broadcast service. After being discharged, he was under contract for the 20th Century Studios. He also attended acting coach and actor Ben Bard's drama school for which he worked on jobs such as a parcel packer and parking enforcement officer to pay his tuition. He began his career in 1959, appearing in the western television series Fury. He also played Cabot in the 1960 film Walk Like a Dragon, which was his film debut.

In 1961, Young starred in the new CBS western television series Gunslinger, playing the main character, Cord. He co-starred with Preston Foster, who played Captain Zachary Wingate; Charles H. Gray who played Pico McGuire; Dee Pollock, who played Billy Urchin; Midge Ware, who played Amby Hollister; and John Pickard who played Sgt. Major Murdock.

Young guest-starred in television programs including Tombstone Territory, Maverick, The Streets of San Francisco, Bonanza, Mannix, Star Trek: The Original Series, Lawman, Cheyenne, Wagon Train, 77 Sunset Strip, Mission: Impossible and Laramie. He also appeared in the films He Rides Tall (1964), Charro! (1969), A Man Called Sledge (1970), Chrome and Hot Leather (1971), Black Gunn (1972), Play It as It Lays (1972), Superchick (1973), The Outfit (1973), Policewomen (1974), Act of Vengeance (1974), Guyana: Cult of the Damned (1979) and Up Your Alley (1989).

Young starred in the 1964 film Taggart along with actor, Dan Duryea. He retired in 1993, last appearing in the science fiction television series Quantum Leap, where Young played screenwriter John Huston in the episode "Goodbye Norma Jean".

== Death ==
Young died on February 26, 2002 of lung cancer at his home in West Hollywood, California, at the age of 64.

== Television ==
Year	Title	Role	Notes
1965	Bonanza	Trace	S6:E31, "The Return”
1968	Star Trek	Kryton	S3:E13, "Elaan of Troyius"
1971	The Virginian	Kressel	season 9 episode 24 (Jump-up)
1974	Chopper One	Frank Connor	season 1 episode 10 (Deadly Carrier), in which France Nuyen also appears, reuniting Young with the actress who portrayed the titular character from the Star Trek: The Original Series episode "Elaan of Troyius"
