= Karl Engemann =

American music industry executive and producer

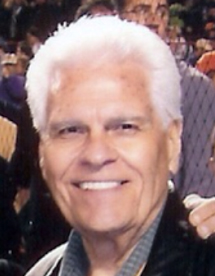
- Born: Paul Karl Engemann; 1930 (age 95–96); Detroit, Michigan, U.S.
- Education: Brigham Young University (BS)
- Occupations: Record executive, producer, manager
- Years active: 1958–present
- Spouse: Geraldine "Gerri" Engemann
- Children: 5, including Paul Engemann

Karl Engemann is an American record industry executive, producer, and entertainment industry personal manager. An A&R manager at Capitol Records, he managed The Osmonds and broadcaster Larry King. He continues to manage the careers of Shawn King, Gerri Engemann, Paul Engemann, Shannon Engemann, Ryan Engemann and Bret Engemann.

== Early life and education ==
Engemann was born and raised in Detroit. He graduated from Brigham Young University in 1958 with a Bachelor of Science degree in marketing, elected to Phi Kappa Phi Honor Society.

== Career ==
Engemann served in the United States Army from 1951 to 1953. He played saxophone and piano in big bands and small combos and sang in vocal groups during high school, college, and his military service.

In March 1958, Engemann was hired as a Warner Records as a producer. He produced two of the label's first top ten single records, "Kookie, Kookie (Lend Me Your Comb)" with Edd Byrnes, and "Sixteen Reasons" with Connie Stevens.

In March 1960, Engemann joined Capitol Records as a producer. In 1962, he became director of business affairs. He was promoted to general manager for A&R in 1965, and in 1967, was appointed vice president of artist and repertoire. During the ten years he spent at Capitol, he was instrumental in the signing of, among others, The Beach Boys, The Lettermen, Bob Segar, Joe South, The Classics IV, Bobbie Gentry, Grand Funk Railroad and Dorsey Burnette.

Engemann exited Capitol Records in 1970 and established MGM South Records, a production and publishing partnership with Bill Lowery out of Atlanta. Artists released on the MGM South label included Sami Jo, Classics IV, Tommy Roe, and Billy Joe Royal.

Engemann also partnered with his brother, Bob Engemann, and his nephew, John Hess, to found the Independent Recorders Studios in Studio City, Los Angeles, which was sold in 1977 to record producer Freddie Perren and his wife, Christine Perren.

In 1976, he began managing the recording careers of Donny Osmond, Marie Osmond, The Osmonds and Jimmy Osmond. In 1979 he was appointed personal manager in various career stages of all the Osmond entities, and finally just Marie Osmond over a 35-year span.

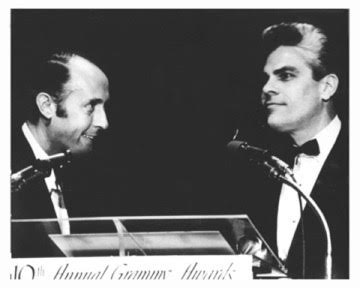
Karl Engemann accepting a Grammy Award for The Beatles

In December 2009, he parted company with Marie over a legal dispute.

Since 2010, Engemann has managed the career of radio and television host and broadcaster Larry King and others.
