= Connie Stevens discography =

- Studio albums: 9
- Soundtrack albums: 3
- Singles: 20

The discography of American singer Connie Stevens includes numerous studio and compilation albums, and 20 singles. Stevens first garnered success in 1960, when her hit song "Sixteen Reasons" peaked at number 3 on the Billboard Hot 100 and number 9 on the UK Singles Chart. She was first heard as the female voice on the 1959 hit song from Edd Byrnes, "Kookie, Kookie (Lend Me Your Comb)".

== Discography ==
All releases are on Warner Bros. Records Inc., except where noted.

=== Studio albums ===
- Concetta (1958)
- Connie Stevens as Cricket in the Warner Bros. Series Hawaiian Eye (1960)
- From Me to You (1962)
- The Hank Williams Song Book (1962)
- Tradition... a Family at Christmas (2010, GTS Records) with her daughters, Joely and Tricia Leigh Fisher

=== Compilations ===
- Highlights of Connie Stevens (1963) – Japan 12-track LP
- The Best of Connie Stevens (196-) – Japan 14-track LP
- The Best of Connie Stevens (1982/1990) – Japan and Australia 14-track LP/Japan 18-track CD
- The Complete Warner Bros. Singles (2012, Real Gone Music/Warner) US 36-track 2-CD
- The Very Best of Connie Stevens (2012) – Japan 23-track CD

=== Bootleg compilations ===
These bootlegs consist of unlicensed recordings from Warner Bros. and other labels.

- Sixteen Reasons (1991, Teenager Records) – Denmark 17-track LP
- Sixteen Reasons (1994, Teen Sound Records) – Canada 34-track CD
- The Ultimate Collection (2003, Teenager Records) – Germany 30-track CD
- America's Sweetheart (2011, Babe) – unknown 30-track CD
- Sensational (2012, Remember) – Germany 28-track CD
- Sixteen Reasons (2015, Jasmine Records) – UK 33-track CD
- Stereo Singles Collection (2022, Classics France) – "Switzerland" 28-track CD

=== Singles ===
| Year | Songs (A-side, B-side) Both sides from same album except where indicated | Peak chart positions | | | Album |
| Year | Songs (A-side, B-side) Both sides from same album except where indicated | US Billboard | US Cashbox | UK | Album |
|---|---|---|---|---|---|
| 1959 | "Kookie, Kookie (Lend Me Your Comb)" with Edd Byrnes | 4 | — | 27 | Kookie Star of "77 Sunset Strip" |
| 1959 | "Apollo" b/w "Why Do I Cry for Joey?" | — | — | — | Connie Stevens from "Hawaiian Eye" |
| 1960 | "Sixteen Reasons" b/w "Little Sister" (non-album track) | 3 | 5 | 9 | Connie Stevens from "Hawaiian Eye" |
| 1960 | "Too Young to Go Steady" b/w "A Little Kiss Is a Kiss, Is a Kiss" | 71 | 86 | — | Connie Stevens from "Hawaiian Eye" |
| 1961 | "Make Believe Lover" b/w "And This Is Mine" | — | — | — | Non-album tracks |
| 1961 | "If You Don't Somebody Else Will" b/w "The Greenwood Tree" | — | — | — | Non-album tracks |
| 1962 | "Why'd You Wanna Make Me Cry" b/w "Just One Kiss" | 52 | 57 | — | Non-album tracks |
| 1962 | "Mr. Songwriter" b/w "I Couldn't Say No" | 43 | 61 | — | Non-album tracks |
| 1962 | "Hey Good Lookin'" b/w "Nobody's Lonesome for Me" | 104 | — | — | The Hank Williams Song Book |
| 1963 | "Little Miss-Understood" b/w "There Goes Your Guy" | — | — | — | Non-album tracks |
| 1964 | "They're Jealous of Me" b/w "A Girl Never Knows" | — | — | — | Non-album tracks |
| 1965 | "Now That You've Gone" b/w "Lost in Wonderland" | 53 | 55 | — | Non-album tracks |
| 1965 | "Something Beautiful" b/w "In the Deep of Night" | — | — | — | Non-album tracks |
| 1966 | "In My Room" b/w "Don't You Want to Love Me" | — | — | — | Non-album tracks |
| 1966 | "All of My Life" b/w "That's All I Want from You" | — | — | — | Non-album tracks |
| 1966 | "Most of All" b/w "How Bitter the Taste of Love" | — | — | — | Non-album tracks |
| 1966 | "It'll Never Happen Again" b/w "What Will I Tell Him" | — | — | — | Non-album tracks |
| 1968 | "Wouldn't It Be Nice (To Have Wings and Fly)" b/w "Cinderella Could Have Saved Us All" (MGM Records) | — | — | — | Non-album tracks |
| 1970 | "5:30 Plane" b/w "She'll Never Understand Him (Like I Do)" (Bell Records) | — | — | — | Non-album tracks |
| 1970 | "Keep Growing Strong" b/w "Tick-Tock" (Bell Records) | — | — | — | Non-album tracks |
| 1972 | "Simple Girl" b/w "Take Me Back to Roses and Rainbows" (Bell Records) | — | — | — | Non-album tracks |
"—" denotes releases that did not chart or not released in the territories
