= Erin O'Brien (actress) =

American actress (1934–2021)

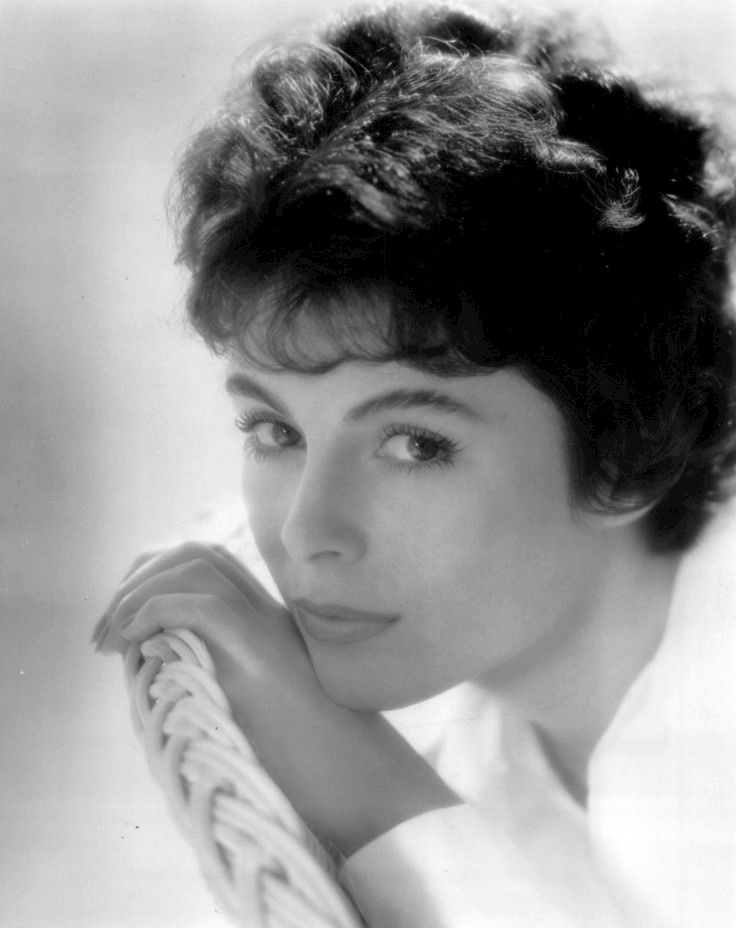
- O'Brien in 1959
- Born: January 17, 1934; Los Angeles, California, U.S.
- Died: May 20, 2021 (aged 87); Seattle, Washington, U.S.
- Education: St. Anthony High School
- Occupations: Actress, singer
- Years active: 1957–1967
- Known for: Girl on the Run; Onionhead; John Paul Jones
- Spouses: Jimmy Fitzgerald (m. 1951; div. 1963); Kanan A. Awni (m. 1963)
- Children: 5

Erin O'Brien (January 17, 1934 – May 20, 2021) was an American actress and singer, active during the mid-twentieth century and best known as the leading lady of arguably the first made-for-TV movie in 1958, Girl on the Run, which also served as the pilot for the television series 77 Sunset Strip written by Roy Huggins and starring Efrem Zimbalist Jr., which played briefly in theaters before airing on television on October 10, 1958.

== Early years ==
The daughter of a milk delivery man, Vincent O'Brien, and his wife, Betty, she was the oldest of 14 siblings, with seven sisters and six brothers. She was born in Hollywood, grew up in Long Beach, California, and was a graduate of St. Anthony High School.

At the age of 15, O'Brien had a notable encounter singing to Helen Keller, who was staying temporarily at a nunnery in Pasadena, California. One account of that encounter states, "The sister surrounding Keller's bed encouraged a frightened O'Brien to continue [singing]. Finally Keller reached up and held her hand to O'Brien's throat to feel the vibrato. Keller began crying. 'Afterward she kept kissing my hand again and again and again.'"

== Career ==
Shortly after graduating from high school, O'Brien sang with a choir directed by Walter Schumann. Then she appeared for three years on a five-day-a-week television show hosted by Al Jarvis and featuring Betty White. Following that work, O'Brien toured as a singer and eventually became a winner on Arthur Godfrey's Talent Scouts on television, which led to a one-year contract on The Tonight Show.

During the late 1950s and 1960s, O'Brien also performed as a supporting character and leading lady in episodes of a variety of television shows, including many popular Western series. Some of those series include Bat Masterson, Sugarfoot, Cheyenne, Maverick, Colt .45, Laramie, Tombstone Territory, and Death Valley Days. She performed as well on The Asphalt Jungle television series and on Perry Mason. Her acting was not limited to the "small screen". She was cast, for example, in the 1967 feature film In Like Flint. Earlier, casting directors considered her as a potential costar for Gene Kelly in Marjorie Morningstar (1958), but she was deemed too tall for her co-star, so the role was given to Natalie Wood.

O'Brien was a singer on The Frank Sinatra Show on CBS-TV (1950–1952), The Eddie Fisher Show on NBC-TV (1957–1959), and the syndicated The Liberace Show (1958–1959). She entertained troops with Bob Hope, Jayne Mansfield, and Frances Langford in 1957 and was the face of advertising campaigns for Schlitz and later, Smirnoff.

According to the Internet Movie Database, O'Brien was a featured solo singer on The Steve Allen Show from 1956 to 1958. (Note: An Associated Press article published on June 14, 1957, says, "Steve Allen put her on four programs.") Her films include Onionhead with Andy Griffith (1958) and John Paul Jones with Robert Stack (1959).

In 1958, O'Brien released an album, Songs From the Heart of Erin O'Brien on Coral Records.

== Personal life and death ==
On June 16, 1951, O'Brien married public relations practitioner James Fitzgerald. They had three sons and divorced on January 17, 1963. She had two children by her second husband, Kanan Awni, whom she married twice. She died on May 20, 2021.
