= Up Periscope =

1959 World War II drama directed by Gordon Douglas

- Theatrical release poster
- Directed by: Gordon Douglas
- Screenplay by: Richard H. Landau
- Based on: Up Periscope; 1956 novel by Robb White
- Produced by: Aubrey Schenck; Howard W. Koch; Edwin F. Zabel
- Starring: James Garner; Edmond O'Brien; Andra Martin; Alan Hale Jr.
- Narrated by: Edmond O'Brien
- Cinematography: Carl E. Guthrie
- Edited by: John F. Schreyer
- Music by: Ray Heindorf
- Distributed by: Warner Bros. Pictures
- Release date: March 4, 1959
- Running time: 112 minutes
- Country: United States
- Language: English
- Budget: $2 million
- Box office: $1.5 million (est. US/ Canada rentals)

Up Periscope is a 1959 World War II submarine film drama directed by Gordon Douglas, produced by Aubrey Schenck and starring James Garner and Edmond O'Brien. The supporting cast features Andra Martin, Alan Hale Jr., Edd Byrnes, Warren Oates and Saundra Edwards. The film was shot and processed in WarnerScope and Technicolor and was distributed by Warner Bros. Pictures. The screenplay was written by Richard H. Landau and Robb White, adapted from White's novel of the same name.

Garner called the film "another piece of crap that Warner Bros. stuck me in while I was under contract."

== Plot ==
Lt. Kenneth Braden, a newly trained U.S. Navy frogman, is unexpectedly ordered to report for duty without being able to notify his new girlfriend Sally Johnson. He learns that she is a naval intelligence officer responsible for a recent confirmation of his character and fitness for a special mission.

Submarine commander Stevenson, whose crew's morale has been shaken by the recent unnecessary death of a crew member, is ordered to take Braden to the island of Kusaie (Kosrae) to photograph a code book at a Japanese radio station. Stevenson waits in Lelu Harbor while Braden executes his covert mission.

After Braden returns, Stevenson dictates a letter accusing himself of endangering his submarine and crew in order to make Braden's mission easier. When they reach Pearl Harbor, Braden informs Stevenson that his crew "lost" the letter. To Braden's surprise and delight, Sally is waiting at the dock to greet him.

== Cast ==
- James Garner as Lt. (j.g.) Kenneth M. Braden
- Edmond O'Brien as Commander Paul Stevenson
- Andra Martin as Sally Johnson
- Alan Hale Jr. as Ensign/Lt. (j.g.) Pat Malone (billed as Alan Hale)
- Carleton Carpenter as Lt. Phil Carney
- William Leslie as Lt. Doherty
- Frank Gifford as Ensign Cy Mount
- Henry Kulky as Chief Petty Officer York
- Edd Byrnes as Pharmacist Mate Ash (billed as Edward Byrnes)
- Richard Bakalyan as Seaman Peck
- Sean Garrison as Seaman Floyd
- Warren Oates as Seaman Kovacs
- Saundra Edwards as a bar girl (uncredited)

== Reception ==
In a contemporary review for The New York Times, critic A. H. Weiler wrote: "[I]t seems to run a familiar and somewhat undramatic course. ... Although there are moments of tension in 'Up Periscope,' it sails a movie course that is not particularly exciting. The bravery shown here is no longer unsung."

== See also ==
- List of American films of 1959
