= A Fever in the Blood =

1961 film by Vincent Sherman

- Theatrical release poster
- Directed by: Vincent Sherman
- Screenplay by: Roy Huggins; Harry Kleiner
- Based on: A Fever in the Blood; 1959 novel by William Pearson
- Produced by: Roy Huggins
- Starring: Efrem Zimbalist, Jr. Angie Dickinson; Jack Kelly; Don Ameche; Ray Danton; Herbert Marshall; Rhodes Reason; Robert Colbert; Carroll O'Connor
- Cinematography: J. Peverell Marley
- Edited by: William H. Ziegler
- Music by: Ernest Gold
- Production company: Warner Bros. Pictures
- Distributed by: Warner Bros. Pictures
- Release date: January 28, 1961
- Running time: 117 minutes
- Country: United States
- Language: English

A Fever in the Blood is a 1961 Warner Bros. American courtroom drama directed by Vincent Sherman with music by Ernest Gold, cinematography by J. Peverell Marley and editing by William H. Ziegler. It is based on the 1959 novel of the same name by former lawyer William Pearson. The film stars Efrem Zimbalist Jr., Angie Dickinson, Jack Kelly and Don Ameche. Carroll O'Connor appears in his credited film debut.

== Plot ==
Judge Leland Hoffman and district attorney Dan Callahan take a weekend hunting trip. However, Callahan is summoned back to the city when socialite Paula Thornwall is found murdered in her posh estate. Because of the high-profile nature of the case, Callahan decides to handle the prosecution himself, thus boosting his political ambitions. The victim's estranged husband, Walter Thornwall, becomes Callahan's prime suspect. Eventually, Thornwall is charged with murder. Surprisingly, Leland Hoffman is the judge assigned to hear the case. Coincidentally, it is an election year, and both Callahan and Hoffman have announced a run for governor.

The pressures of the Thornwall murder trial turn the affable Callahan into a ruthless, vindictive prosecutor. He is determined to go to any length to win a conviction. However, his eagerness almost costs him the trial. During questioning, a prosecution witness blurts out that defendant Thornwall had once verbally threatened his murdered wife. The defense immediately makes a motion for mistrial, triggering Callahan's immediate objection. After a tense moment of reflection, Judge Hoffman orders the testimony stricken from the record, but he denies the request for mistrial. In the end, the jury finds Thornwall guilty, and Callahan appears headed for the governor's mansion.

However, Thornwall's gardener is found to be the actual murderer when he is apprehended by police on a lesser crime. Callahan, struggling for more political self-promotion, calls a press conference to announce Thornwall's acquittal and release. But when delegates at the party's state convention consider their gubernatorial nominee, they reject the zealous Callahan in favor of Judge Hoffman, the quiet man of conscience.

== Cast ==
- Efrem Zimbalist Jr. as Leland Hoffman
- Angie Dickinson as Cathy Simon
- Jack Kelly as Dan Callahan
- Don Ameche as Sen. Alex Simon
- Ray Danton as Clem Marker
- Herbert Marshall as Gov. Oliver Thornwall
- Andra Martin as Laura Mayberry
- Jesse White as Mickey Beers
- Rhodes Reason as Walter Thornwall
- Robert Colbert as Thomas J. Morely
- Carroll O'Connor as Matt Keenan
- Parley Baer as Charlie Bosworth
- Saundra Edwards as Lucy Callahan

== Production ==
Director Vincent Sherman at first considered the story "old-fashioned...with dismal prospects." Screenwriter Roy Huggins agreed and attempted to update the script.

The film features a roster of Warner Bros. television contract players. Sherman criticized the casting of television actors such as Jack Kelly and Efrem Zimbalist Jr. because he felt that their presence on screen would "cause audiences to regard the film as merely an enlarged TV program." Huggins also felt that the actors were miscast and that Zimbalist was too young for the role of the judge.

Studio head Jack L. Warner wanted to grant television actors such as Kelly, star of the series Maverick, a chance to appear as one of the leads in a feature film. Warner once commented that "naturally they want to get out of TV because the work is not easy. They want to get into features where they can have an easier occupation."

== Reception ==
In a contemporary review for the Los Angeles Times, critic Philip K. Scheuer wrote: "Remember when movies told stories? 'A Fever in the Blood' tells a story; it is ALL story, a little like the kind, with political backgrounds, that Frank Capra used to do so well. ... The wind-up is pure fairytale—or pure Capra—but it sends you out with your faith restored, for the moment anyway, in the Great American Dream."

Kate Cameron of the New York Daily News wrote: "The political atmosphere seems authentic, but some of the moves in the game are too patently contrived to convince an audience that it is witnessing a real-life drama."

In the Chicago Tribune, critic Mae Tinee remarked: `"Some of the bargaining and manipulation behind the scenes is moderately interesting, but the final scenes, in which the best man wins in a walkaway, struck me as highly unconvincing."
