= Sixteen Reasons =

"Sixteen Reasons (Why I Love You)"

Single by Connie Stevens

from the album As Cricket in "Hawaiian Eye"
- B-side: "Little Sister"
- Released: December 1959
- Recorded: 1959
- Genre: Traditional pop
- Length: 1:57
- Label: Warner Bros. Records 5137
- Songwriters: Bill Post and Doree Post

Connie Stevens singles chronology
"Kookie, Kookie (Lend Me Your Comb)" (1959)	"Sixteen Reasons (Why I Love You)" (1959)	"Too Young to Go Steady" (1960)

"Sixteen Reasons (Why I Love You)" is a list song written by Bill and Doree Post in 1959 recounting sixteen reasons for being in love, beginning "The way you hold my hand", which in 1960 reached #3 via a recording by Connie Stevens.

== Composition ==
The composers, Bill and Doree Post, were a husband-and-wife team from Kansas who had several single releases on Crest Records but their own version of "Sixteen Reasons" was not released until 1963, by which time Doree Post had died from stomach cancer.

== Connie Stevens recording ==
The Connie Stevens single with arrangement and accompaniment by Don Ralke was issued in December 1959 with the Robert Allen composition "Little Sister" being the intended A-side - another version of the last-named song by Cathy Carr was issued as a single at the same time.

"Sixteen Reasons" was Stevens' second Top 40 hit, the precedent being a duet with Edd Byrnes: "Kookie, Kookie (Lend Me Your Comb)", a novelty spoken word number which reached #4. Stevens had her success with "Sixteen Reasons" despite her label Warner Bros. handicapping her promotion of the single: as the song was not published by MPHC (their in-house Music Publishing Holding Company), the label refused to allow Stevens to perform the song on Hawaiian Eye and also prevented her from singing it on The Ed Sullivan Show.

Although Stevens would continue to record for Warner Bros. until 1972 – with a brief tenure at MGM Records in 1968 – none of her singles subsequent to "Sixteen Reasons" would reach the Top 40; her last appearance on the Billboard Hot 100 would be in 1965.

Professionally Stevens has downplayed her identity as the singer of a "golden oldie", stating in 2005: "I never did 'Sixteen Reasons' in my stage act. It was really a kids' song aimed at 12-year-old girls. It would be a little silly for me to do it now."

=== Chart performance ===
It was as "Sixteen Reasons" that Stevens' single debuted at #89 on the Billboard Hot 100 dated 1 February 1960, peaking at #3 on the chart dated 9 May 1960. "Sixteen Reasons" crossed over to the Hot R&B Sides chart, where it went to #10.

"Sixteen Reasons" also afforded Stevens a hit in the UK over the spring and summer of 1960 despite at least three cover versions. After reaching #9 - its overall UK peak - in May 1960, Stevens' single re-entered the top 20 at #17 that June, spending 12 weeks on the chart in all.

Total sales for Connie Stevens' "Sixteen Reasons" single are estimated at two million units. The sheet music for the song was also a bestseller in both the US and the UK. "Sixteen Reasons" was a popular song on the American Forces Network in Germany that summer.

=== Chart positions ===
Chart (1960)	Peak position
UK Singles (OCC)	9
U.S. Billboard Hot 100	3
U.S. Billboard Hot R&B Sides	10

== Cover versions ==
- In 1960, there were three aforementioned covers by British singers, specifically Sheila Buxton, Shani Wallis and Marion Ryan.
- In 1960 Italian singer Angelina Monti rendered "Sixteen Reasons" in German as Sechzehn Gründe.
- Also in 1960, Auckland-singer Esme Stephens and The Silhouettes With The Peter Posa Combo released "Sixteen Reasons" in New Zealand on Zodiac Records; coupled with a cover of Anita Bryant's "Paper Roses"; the single reached #5 on the Lever Hit Parade.
- The Lettermen, who Stevens had played with as The Foremost, recorded a version of the track for their 1962 album, Once Upon a Time.
- Lawrence Welk featured the song on his 1964 album, The Golden Millions.
- A comedy version was released as a double A-side on the Laverne & Shirley single Chapel of Love in 1976.
- Lisa Mychols remade "Sixteen Reasons" for her 1991 Lost Winter's Dream album.

== Popular culture ==
- "Sixteen Reasons" is prominently showcased in David Lynch's 2001 film Mulholland Drive with actress Elizabeth Lackey, whose character lip-syncs to the Connie Stevens track.

== See also ==
- Connie Stevens discography
