= Rhodes Reason =

American actor (1930–2014)

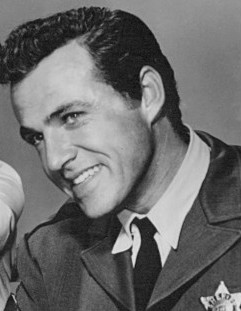
- Reason in Bus Stop (1961)
- Born: April 19, 1930; Glendale, California, US
- Died: December 26, 2014 (aged 84); Palm Springs, California, US
- Occupation: Actor
- Years active: 1948-1977
- Relatives: Rex Reason (brother)

Rhodes Reason (April 19, 1930 – December 26, 2014) was an American actor who appeared in more than 200 roles in television, film, and stage.

== Film and television career ==
Reason was born in Glendale in Los Angeles County, California, the son of Rex G. Reason and the former Jean Robinson. The younger brother of actor Rex Reason, Rhodes Reason made his acting start at the age of 18 in a production of Romeo and Juliet directed by Charles Laughton.

Among his starring roles were parts in King Kong Escapes (1967); 39 episodes of the British television series White Hunter (TV series), (1957); and as Sheriff Will Mayberry in the ABC drama series Bus Stop. Reason was cast as Chuck Wilson in "Rodeo Round-Up" in 1956 and as Kinnard in "Dust of Destruction", episodes of the Western aviation adventure series, Sky King, episode "Conflict" in the "Rifleman" as Ben Kendrick.

Reason had a major part as hired gunslinger Burr Fulton in an episode of the ABC/Warner Bros. Western series, Sugarfoot in the season 1 episode "The Strange Land" (1957). Reason was a guest star in Frontier Doctor, a syndicated Western series. He was cast as Black Jack in the episode "The Homesteaders" (1958). Another ABC/WB Western series Reason appeared in was Colt .45, as Ben Thompson in the episode "Appointment in Agoura" (1960); Reason also appeared in The Rifleman.

Reason guest starred on Tales of the Texas Rangers, Maverick (1957 episode "Ghost Rider"), Tombstone Territory (1957 episode "Ambush at Gila Gulch"), Perry Mason as Martin Eldridge in the 1966 episode, "The Case of the Bogus Buccaneers", 77 Sunset Strip (1958), Bourbon Street Beat (1960), The Time Tunnel (1966), The Big Valley (the episode "Plunder" in 1967), The Lucy Show (also 1967), Star Trek in 1967 as gladiator Flavius Maximus ("Bread and Circuses", 1968), Here's Lucy (also 1968), and The Bob Newhart Show (1976).

Reason appeared as Peter Jeffries in the 1955 episode, "California's First Ice Man" of the Western television anthology series, Death Valley Days. He also appeared as Wild Bill Hickok in the 1966 episode (S15, E13) of Death Valley Days, “A Calamity Called Jane”.

His feature film appearances include Yellowstone Kelly (1959, with Clint Walker) and A Fever in the Blood (1961). In the early 1980s, he starred in the Broadway musical Annie, playing Daddy Warbucks for nearly three years.

Reason died in Palm Springs at the age of 84 of lymphoma.

== Filmography ==
Year	Title	Role	Notes
1955	Lady Godiva of Coventry	Sweyn	Uncredited
1956	Crime Against Joe	George Niles	
1956	Tension at Table Rock	Baid	Uncredited
1956	Cheyenne	Les Shore	Episode: The Trap
1956	Flight to Hong Kong	Bob Denham	Uncredited
1956	Emergency Hospital	Juvenile Officer Ross	
1956	The Desperados Are in Town	Frank Banner	
1956	Highway Patrol	Robber	Episode "Motel Robbery"
1957	Voodoo Island	Matthew Gunn	
1957	The Silent Service	Lt. Commander John Frye	Episode: The Batfish Scores
1957	Jungle Heat	Major Richard 'Dick' Grey	
1957	Maverick	Hank Foster	Episode: Ghost Rider
1957	Sugarfoot	Burr Fulton - Hired gunslinger	Episode: The Strange Land
1959	The Big Fisherman	Andrew	
1959	Yellowstone Kelly	Maj. Towns	
1960	Cheyenne	Bill Lockhart	Episode: Outcast of Cripple Creek
1961	A Fever in the Blood	Walter Thornwall	
1962	The Rifleman: The Conflict	Ben Kendrick	
1967	King Kong Escapes	Commander Carl Nelson	
1970	The Delta Factor	Dr. Fredericks	
1976	Cat Murkil and the Silks	Detective Harder	
