= Girl on the Run (1958 film) =

1958 private detective film

- Screenplay by: Marion Hargrove
- Story by: Roy Huggins
- Directed by: Richard L. Bare
- Starring: Efrem Zimbalist Jr. Erin O'Brien; Shepperd Strudwick; Edward Byrnes; Barton MacLane
- Music by: Howard Jackson
- Country of origin: United States
- Original language: English

Production
- Producer: Roy Huggins
- Cinematography: Harold E. Stine
- Editor: Harold Minter
- Running time: 77 minutes

Original release
- Release: October 10, 1958

Girl on the Run is a 1958 private detective film directed by Richard L. Bare and starring Efrem Zimbalist Jr., Erin O'Brien, Shepperd Strudwick, Edd Byrnes and Barton MacLane.

The film is based on characters and situations created by writer Roy Huggins in a series of 1940s novels and novellas. It aired on ABC as the pilot episode for 77 Sunset Strip after a brief theatrical release in the Caribbean.

== Plot ==
In a large Northeastern American city, nightclub singer Kathy Allen witnesses the murder of a witness in a major trial. Though she had a good view of the murderer, she is unable to identify his photograph in police files. After a sniper unsuccessfully makes an attempt on her life, Kathy flees to the West Coast of the United States.

Singing under a new identity, "Karen Shay", and hair style, Kathy meets Stuart Bailey, a former university professor of languages and O.S.S. agent who she discovers is a private detective. Stu realises he's been hired by someone to locate her and make her the target of a young hired assassin.

== Cast ==
- Efrem Zimbalist Jr. as Stuart Bailey
- Erin O'Brien as Kathy Allen/Karen Shay
- Shepperd Strudwick as James McCullough/Ralph Graham
- Edward Byrnes as Kenneth Smiley
- Barton MacLane as Francis J. Brannigan
- Ray Teal as Harper
- Vince Barnett as Janitor
- Harry Lauter as Drunk

O'Brien's singing voice was not dubbed; she appeared as a featured solo singer on six episodes of The Steve Allen Show during this period.

== Production ==
Writer Roy Huggins created the story's characters in a series of 1940s novels and novellas, but Marion Hargrove wrote the screenplay for Girl on the Run. Warner Bros. released the film with Hargrove's title, and when it later aired on television, it was not the debut of a new series but the television premiere of a theatrical film. This allowed Warner Bros. to claim that the resulting 77 Sunset Strip television series was based on Girl on the Run, which it wholly owned, rather than on Huggins' literary work.

In an interview with the Archive of American Television, director Bare recalled that the film was a result of an idea that Warner Bros. Television could create a B movie feature film. The film was shot in ten days, however it was decided to show the film to the American Broadcasting Company who wanted to turn the film into a weekly series, but with two provisos. The film would not be shown theatrically in the USA but would appear as the first episode of the series. Secondly, ABC wanted Edd Byrnes as a series regular. In the film Byrnes played vicious killer Kenneth Smiley, who speaks in hipster slang. When the youth audience reacted favorably to his performance, Byrnes was offered the role of a new recurring character in the television series.

In 77 Sunset Strip, Byrnes became Kookie, a comical carhop who also uses slang and compulsively combs his hair. Byrne's appearance in Girl on the Run was addressed directly in the series. At the beginning of the episode that followed Girl on the Run, Zimbalist broke the fourth wall with the announcement:

We previewed this show, and because Edd Byrnes was such a hit, we decided that Kookie and his comb had to be in our series. So this week, we'll just forget that in the pilot he went off to prison to be executed.
