= Yellowstone Kelly =

1959 film by Gordon Douglas

- Theatrical release poster
- Directed by: Gordon Douglas
- Screenplay by: Burt Kennedy
- Based on: the novel by Clay Fisher
- Starring: Clint Walker; Edd Byrnes; John Russell
- Cinematography: Carl E. Guthrie
- Edited by: William H. Ziegler
- Music by: Howard Jackson
- Color process: Technicolor
- Production company: Warner Bros. Pictures
- Distributed by: Warner Bros. Pictures
- Release date: November 11, 1959 (New York City)
- Running time: 92 minutes
- Country: United States
- Language: English
- Box office: $1.7 million (est. US/ Canada rentals)

Yellowstone Kelly is a 1959 American Western film based upon a novel by Heck Allen (using his pen name Clay Fisher, which shows in the film credits) with a screenplay by Burt Kennedy starring Clint Walker as Luther Sage "Yellowstone" Kelly, and directed by Gordon Douglas. The film was originally supposed to be directed by John Ford with John Wayne in the Clint Walker role, but Ford and Wayne opted to make The Horse Soldiers, instead.

At the time, the film was notable for using the leads of then-popular Warner Bros. Television shows, Cheyenne (Walker), Lawman (John Russell), 77 Sunset Strip (Edd "Kookie" Byrnes), and The Alaskans (Ray Danton), as well as Warner contract stars such as Andra Martin, Claude Akins, Rhodes Reason, and Gary Vinson.

The novel was based on the real-life Luther Kelly.

== Plot ==
Trapper Yellowstone Kelly and his partner Anse Harper come upon the sick Arapaho Wahleeah, who is a captive of Sioux Chief Gall and is desired by both Gall and his nephew Sayapi. Kelly keeps Wahleeah to cure her and promises to return her to Gall when spring comes. However, Sayapi vows to take Wahleeah back and kill Kelly. As winter ends, Wahleeah has recovered and wishes to return to her people and not be returned to Gall or Sayapi. She finds herself falling in love with Kelly, but Sayapi attacks Kelly's cabin while he is away trapping, injuring Harper and taking Wahleeah. When Kelly returns, he finds his cabin burning and Harper alive but succumbing to his wounds. Before his death, though, he tells Kelly that Sayapi has taken Wahleeah and confesses that he was preparing to return her to her people. Kelly tracks down Sayapi's band and engages in a gunfight that kills Sayapi and his braves. Kelly intends to return Wahleeah to her people to honor Harper's dying wish, but along the way, they come across a cavalry troop that has been attacked by Gall. Gall and his warriors return to attack the troop. Before the attack, Gall confronts Kelly, telling him he can leave in peace if he gives up Wahleeah, but the troops must remain to be slaughtered. Kelly will not give up Wahleeah if it means the deaths of the soldiers. Gall's warriors mount the first attack, killing many of the troops. All seems lost as Gall prepares for his second attack, when Wahleeah rides out to Gall in an attempt to save Kelly. Wahleeah is injured when her horse overturns. Kelly and Gall race to her side. Gall realizes that Wahleeah has chosen Kelly and lets the two of them go, but says he will still kill the soldiers. Kelly tells Gall to end the battle so others do not have to feel loss as they do. Gall agrees and leaves with his warriors. Sometime later, Kelly and Wahleeah are seen taking Kelly's fur pelts to a riverboat for delivery.

== Cast ==
- Clint Walker as Luther "Yellowstone" Kelly
- Edd Byrnes as Anse Harper
- John Russell as Gall, Sioux Chief
- Ray Danton as Sayapi, Gall's nephew
- Claude Akins as Sergeant
- Rhodes Reason as Major Towns
- Andra Martin as Wahleeah, Sayapi's Arapaho captive
- Gary Vinson as Lieutenant
- Warren Oates as Corporal

== Production ==
Warner Bros. Pictures announced the project in August 1956, saying that John Wayne would star. It was based on a novel by Clay Fisher, not published until April 1957. When the novel came out the New York Times said it "rates grade A without question".

D.D. Beauchamp was hired to write a script. Then, Eliot Asinof was reported as working on the script. Jack L. Warner assigned Irving Shermer as producer.

By early 1959, the project had become a vehicle for Clint Walker, the star of Warner Bros.' hit TV show Cheyenne and the final script was done by Burt Kennedy, who was under contract to Warner at the time.

Walker's co-star was Edd Byrnes, who had leapt to fame playing "Kookie" on the Warner Bros. detective show 77 Sunset Strip.

Filming took place in April and June 1959, partly on location south of Flagstaff, Arizona, which is now modern-day Sedona, Arizona. "I felt miserable and lost 10 pounds in one month," said Byrnes. Ray Danton was signed to a long-term contract at Warner Bros. after the film.

== Reception ==
The Los Angeles Times called the film "fairly good" in which Byrnes was "a bit too contemporary. Let it be said that he left his comb somewhere in the Sunset Strip and played it straight from there. Burt Kennedy's script is first rate."

According to Kinematograph Weekly, the film performed "better than average" at the British box office in 1959.

== Comic-book adaptation ==
- Dell Four Color #1056 (October 1959) drawn by Dan Spiegle.
