= Luther Kelly =

American soldier, hunter, scout, adventurer, and administrator (1849-1928)

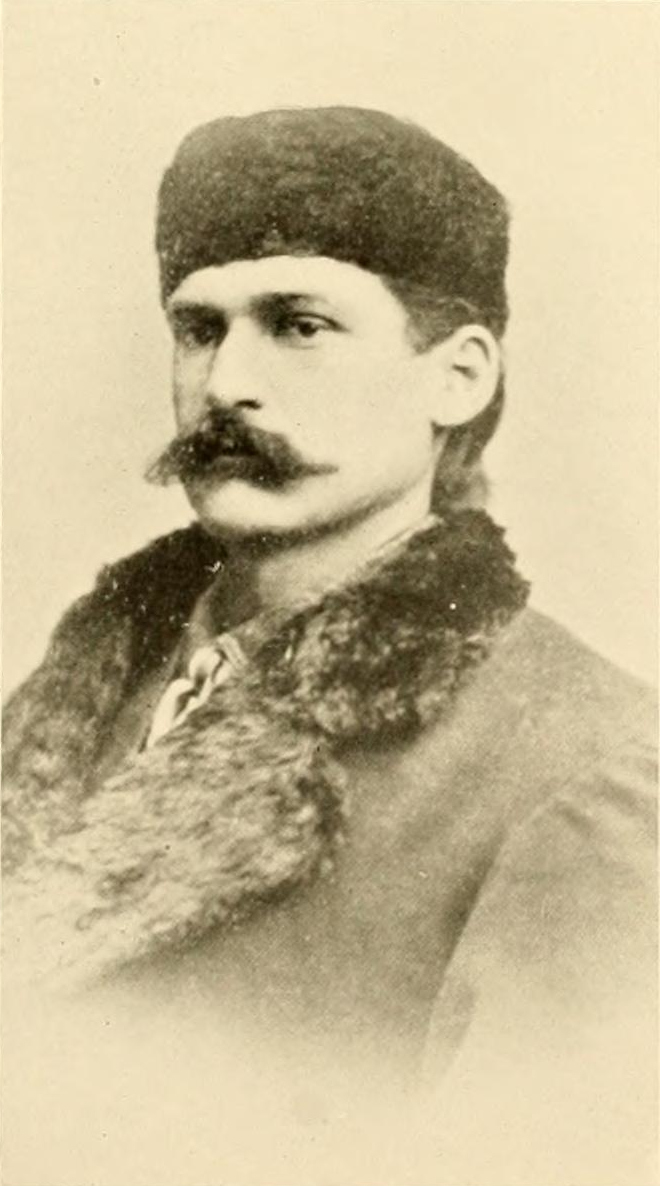
Yellowstone Kelly

Luther Sage "Yellowstone" Kelly (July 27, 1849 – December 17, 1928) was an American soldier, hunter, scout, adventurer and administrator. He served briefly in the American Civil War and then in an 1898 expedition to Alaska. He commanded a U.S. Army company in the Philippine–American War and later served in the civilian administration of the Philippines. On June 26, 1929, Yellowstone Kelly was buried with full military honors overlooking the Yellowstone Valley in Billings, Montana.

== Early life ==
Luther Sage Kelly was born July 27, 1849, in Geneva, New York. His father, also named Luther Kelly, owned a drug and grocery store in Geneva. His mother, Jeanette Eliza Sage, was the daughter of Colonel Hezekiah Sage of nearby Chittenango. Kelly's father died on February 14, 1857, leaving him the man of the family, but the family had enough money saved to live comfortably. In either late 1864 or early 1865, Kelly entered the Genesee Wesleyan Seminary, but his real interest was in joining the army and fighting in the Civil War; he later wrote that he "deplored the fact" that his youth rendered him unfit for military service at that time.

== Military service ==
In the spring of 1865, with the Civil War winding down, Kelly secured permission from his mother to join the Army. He traveled to Rochester, New York, where he attempted to join the Fourth New York Cavalry but was turned down due his young age (15). Later he joined the 10th Infantry by lying about his age. He was unaware that the 10th Infantry was not a volunteer corps and that he would be obliged to continue serving after the war.

Kelly was sent to City Point, Virginia. After Robert E. Lee's surrender at Appomattox his regiment was sent to Richmond and he marched towards Washington, D.C., encamping south of the Potomac River until after the Grand Review of the Armies. Because Kelly's unit had not participated in the Grand Review, it was selected for a parade through Washington on June 8, during which Kelly served as part of the guard detail for the reviewing officer, "his first official duty of any real consequence".

Kelly's unit was stationed in Washington over the summer. In November they were moved by train to St. Paul, Minnesota to be stationed at Fort Snelling for the winter. In May, his company moved among Fort Abercrombie, Fort Wadsworth and Fort Ransom, all in the Dakota Territory. During his free time at these forts, Kelly hunted game to provide fresh meat for his fellow soldiers. In April 1868, Kelly's enlistment in the Army ended, and he was discharged at Fort Ransom.

== American Western Frontier, 1868–1885 ==
Kelly's duel with two Sioux warriors, as depicted by Charles Russell

After leaving the army, Kelly embarked on what The New York Times later called "the most adventurous period of his life", establishing himself as "one of the greatest hunters, trappers, and Indian scouts" of the American West. He first traveled to Fort Garry, now Winnipeg in Canada, where he joined a group of miners, traveling with them to the Red River, where he spent the winter. He left the miners to cross the Assiniboine River, falling in with a group headed toward the Mouse River. After meeting Sitting Bull with this group, Kelly headed alone toward the Missouri River, eventually reaching Fort Buford in the winter.

Not long after his arrival at Fort Buford, Kelly volunteered to carry dispatches to Fort Stevenson, approximately fifty miles down the Missouri River. He left the fort on February 5, 1869. The route between the forts was considered so dangerous, due to the presence of Sioux warriors, that mail carriers were generally accompanied by a cavalry escort, but Kelly set out alone. He arrived safely at Fort Stevenson then set out on his return journey, spending the night at the camp of Bloody Knife, an Arickaree chieftain. The next morning, Kelly was ambushed by two Sioux warriors. The first wounded Kelly's horse with a rifle, while the second shot Kelly in the knee with an arrow. Kelly managed to shoot and kill the first attacker quickly, but the second took cover behind a tree. Kelly eventually shot and killed his second assailant, then returned to Bloody Knife's camp to tell the story. Kelly spent a few days at Bloody Knife's camp recovering from his wound, then rode back to Fort Buford, becoming "something of a hero and a local celebrity" for defeating his two assailants.

(A lot left out here) By his own admission, in his memoirs Kelly noted that he roamed the Judith Basin of Montana for many years especially during that crucial period between 1870 and 1880 when the Indian Wars were heating up. He became renowned as both a hunter and a scout, hunting elk, buffalo, antelope. In fact, he adopted a baby antelope in the late spring of 1876 and was bringing it back to his ranch in the Basin when news of the Little Big Horn reached him. Leaving the antelope with friends he rejoined the Army. He was a prominent scout under General Crook, and was assigned to lead Colonel Nelson Miles' 5th Infantry in Crook's pursuit of Sitting Bull and Crazy Horse.

Kelly stayed in the army after the suppression of the Sioux and the surrender of Crazy Horse, and in the following year, scouting once more for Colonel Miles and the army in their pursuit of Chief Joseph and the Nez Perce. He then went back to his ranch, until duty called again with the outbreak of the Spanish-American War.

== Alaska expedition, 1898 ==
Although the United States had purchased Alaska from Russia in 1867, Americans were not interested in it until gold was discovered there in 1896. In 1898 the U.S. Army deployed three separate units under the commands of Captains Bogardus Eldridge, William R. Abercrombie, and Edwin F. Glenn to map a route from the Yukon, scout the Copper River Valley, and conduct reconnaissance. They would begin near the Prince William Sound and work toward the interior. Kelly was assigned to Glenn's unit as an interpreter and guide.

Departing Seattle by ship on April 7, 1898, they arrived along the Alaskan coastline approximately five days later. While unloading and preparing for the expedition, they received news of the outbreak of the Spanish–American War on April 23. Eldridge's unit was ordered to return to its regiment, while Abercrombie and Glenn's parties were to continue their assigned missions. Although the other soldiers were eager to return to their regiments to join the war, they reasoned that it would be mostly a naval war with little role for the Army. Support for the expedition dwindled in light of the American public's enthusiasm for the war. In accordance with President William McKinley's request for additional men for the war, Kelly was offered a commission as a captain in the U.S. Volunteers. Kelly departed Alaska on October 9, and Glenn's unit continued its mission until November 10. By the time Kelly arrived back in Seattle the war had ended, and with it his captaincy.

The Army's expedition into Alaska was largely overshadowed by the war in the public eye and in contemporary historians' accounts. It made possible the completion in 1923 of the Alaska Railroad, which followed the route mapped by the 1898 expedition. A year later came the maritime Harriman Alaska Expedition.

== Philippine–American War ==
In August 1899 Kelly received another commission as a captain, this time with the Army's 40th Volunteers, following Congress's authorization of an increase in the Army by 35,000 men to put down the insurgency in the Philippines. This war, unlike the six-month war with Spain with 500 combat deaths, "would drag on for three long years" and cost the lives of over 4,000 U.S. servicemen.

The 40th Regiment departed from Fort Riley, Kansas, by train in November 1899 for California. After two weeks there, they shipped out from the Presidio, arriving in the Philippines in late December 1899. Kelly's company was under the command of Brigadier General James Bell, who had served with Kelly during the Nez Perce campaigns of the Indian Wars. Captain Kelly's company aboard the vessel Venus departed Manila along with four other transports headed for the shores of San Miguel Bay. From there the companies began their marches inland to clear the areas of insurgents.

Kelly's company met heavy resistance on the outskirts of the town of LaLud. Insurgents under the command of a Colonel Legaspi opened fire on Kelly's advancing infantrymen with two field guns, but Kelly's men managed to kill the enemy artillerymen and silence the guns. With heavy foliage flanking the enemy's position, Kelly led a frontal assault and routed them. In the process, Kelly captured Legaspi's ceremonial Spanish sword.

Kelly later served in the administration of the new civilian governor of the Philippines, future President William Howard Taft. By 1903, as Kelly wrote to a friend, "I have been in the Philippines so long now (3 years) ... this country is a wearing one. ... my health is excellent, but three years is the limit." On November 15, 1903, Kelly was relieved of his duties in the Philippines and ordered to report back to Washington, D.C., for his next assignment, as Indian Agent for the San Carlos Indian Reservation in Arizona.

== Post-military life ==
In 1915, after a few years gold mining in Nevada, Kelly settled permanently in Paradise, California, where he died on December 17, 1928. He was buried on a high bluff along the Yellowstone River just north of Billings, Montana, with the sword he captured from Legaspi at LaLud. "I feel my body will rest better in Montana, the scene of my earlier activities, than it would in the vastness of Arlington, where I purposed having it laid." The bluff, within the boundaries of Swords Rimrock Park (City of Billings Parks & Recreation), is now referred to as Kelly Mountain.

== Legacy ==
The Billings Chamber of Commerce has created the Yellowstone Kelly Interpretive Site in Billings, Montana located on the Rims area at the southern end of the Chief Black Otter trail. This is after numerous acts of vandalism at his grave site throughout the years. In 2018, the Gold Nugget Museum in Paradise, California, dedicated a memorial walking trail as the "Yellowstone Kelly Heritage Trail", honoring Kelly and the founding families of the Town of Paradise.

Kelly was portrayed by Clint Walker in the 1959 movie Yellowstone Kelly.
