= Onionhead =

1958 film by Norman Taurog

- Theatrical release poster.
- Directed by: Norman Taurog
- Written by: Nelson Gidding
- Based on: Onionhead (novel) by Weldon Hill
- Produced by: Jules Schermer
- Starring: Andy Griffith
- Cinematography: Hal Rosson
- Edited by: William H. Ziegler
- Music by: David Buttolph
- Production company: Warner Bros. Pictures
- Release date: October 1, 1958 (U.S.)
- Running time: 111 minutes
- Country: United States
- Language: English
- Budget: $960,000
- Box office: $2 million

Onionhead is a 1958 American comedy drama film set on a U.S. Coast Guard ship during World War II, starring Andy Griffith and featuring Felicia Farr, Walter Matthau, Erin O'Brien, James Gregory, Joey Bishop and Claude Akins. It is directed by Norman Taurog and is written by Nelson Gidding and Weldon Hill from Hill's novel. Weldon Hill is the pseudonym of William R. Scott, a native Oklahoman who based the novel on his own World War II service in the Coast Guard.

Griffith had experienced success earlier in 1958 with his service comedy No Time for Sergeants, and Onionhead was an attempt to cash in on that success. It was mistakenly marketed as an uproarious comedy, but it is actually a comedy-drama with some dark themes, including theft and adultery. Onionhead was such a notorious flop that it drove Griffith into television, according to Griffith in a videotaped interview in the Archive of American Television.

== Plot ==
In the spring of 1941, Al Woods quits an Oklahoma college to join the armed forces after a quarrel with his co-ed sweetheart, Jo. He joins the Coast Guard, partly by chance due to the flip of a coin. After boot training, Al is assigned to a buoy tender in Boston, the Periwinkle, as a ship's cook, although he has no cooking experience. He encounters immediate hostility from the chief of the galley, Red Wildoe, from new crew mates and cooks' helpers Gutsell and Poznicki, and from his arrogant department head, Lieutenant (junior grade) Higgins.

In a Boston bar, Al picks up Stella, who appears to do this kind of thing with some regularity. They develop a strong attraction, but she seems to be holding out for something more. He befriends Gutsell by fixing him up with a girlfriend of Stella's and learns from Wildoe how to be a ship's cook, making a number of embarrassing mistakes. Al, frustrated after Stella will not spend a night in a hotel room with him, stops seeing her, after which he and the alcoholic Wildoe get drunk together and bond. Wildoe begins seeing Stella with Al's blessing. Pearl Harbor is attacked and war declared. Wildoe abruptly proposes to Stella and they marry. A free-for-all breaks out at their wedding celebration, with a jealous Al instigating a fight with soldiers who are clearly familiar with Stella. Wildoe is assigned to another vessel performing convoy duty at sea. During this time, Stella begins seeing other men. Al tries to prevent this on Wildoe's behalf, but can't resist Stella.

Aboard the Periwinkle, Al becomes the new chief cook. Higgins, promoted to executive officer, is discovered entering amounts less than they pay for the cost of officers' meals to the ledger of the ship's mess and pocketing the difference. He purchases substandard food for the crew to keep the mess budget from showing a deficit. Higgins also objects to finding Al's hair in his food, so Al shaves his scalp bald, earning the nickname "Onionhead".

Erroneously assuming that all the officers are in on the scam, Al bypasses channels to report the theft to the District Office. During leave home to attend his father's funeral, Al reconnects with Jo, realizing that she is the one who he loves. In port again, Wildoe asks Al to take home Stella from the bar when he is recalled to his ship. Stella tries to seduce Al, who calls her a tramp. She replies, "I can't help what I am."

The Periwinkle sinks a submarine in combat, with Al playing a major role, but his accusation of embezzlement impugns the honor of the innocent captain and exposes the ship to scandal at the board of investigation. Al declines to produce any proof of Higgins's misdeeds to save their reputations but privately slips the captain the proof. In a meeting with Al and the executive officer, the captain tells Al that his punishment for an unsubstantiated allegation against an officer is loss of his rating and reassignment to Greenland, but also informs Higgins that he will have to repay every embezzled dollar before his court-martial. He gently chastises Al for not having come to him with the proof earlier, but gives him the leave to marry Jo before he ships out for Greenland.

== Cast ==
- Andy Griffith as Alvin Woods
- Felicia Farr as Stella Papparonis
- Walter Matthau as "Red" Wildoe
- Erin O'Brien as Josephine Hill
- Joe Mantell as Harry O'Neal
- Ray Danton as LTJG Dennis Higgins
- James Gregory as The Captain
- Joey Bishop as Gutsell
- Roscoe Karns as Windy Woods
- Claude Akins as Poznicki
- Ainslie Pryor as Chief Miller
- Sean Garrison as Yeoman Kaffhamp
- Dan Barton as Ens. Fineberg
- Mark Roberts as Lt. Bennett
- Peter Brown as Clark
- Tige Andrews as Charlie Berger
- Karl Lukas as Agnelli
- Paul Smith as Obnoxious Flirt at Party (uncredited)

== Production ==
Filming on Onionhead was held up for a week in November 1957 when Andy Griffith came down with a virulent flu from the "Asian flu" pandemic. The film was shot at Warner Bros. Studios Burbank; location shooting for the film took place at the Coast Guard station in Alameda, California, aboard USCGC Yamacraw (WARC-333), at Coast Guard Base Yerba Buena Island and in Long Beach, California for interiors on USCGC Heather (WAGL-331).

== See also ==
- List of American films of 1958
