= Efrem Zimbalist Jr. =

American actor (1918–2014)

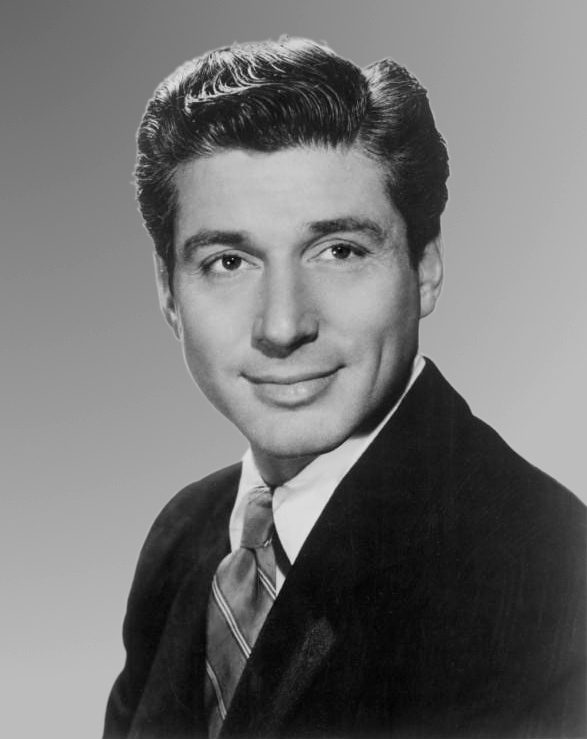
- Zimbalist in 1956
- Born: November 30, 1918; New York City, U.S.
- Died: May 2, 2014 (aged 95); Solvang, California, U.S.
- Education: Yale University
- Occupation: Actor
- Years active: 1945–2008
- Known for: Lewis Erskine, Stuart Bailey, Dandy Jim Buckley, Alfred Pennyworth
- Television: 77 Sunset Strip, The F.B.I., Maverick, Batman: The Animated Series
- Height: 6 ft 0 in (1.83 m)
- Spouses: Emily Munroe McNair (m. 1941; died 1950) Loranda Stephanie Spalding (m. 1956; div. 1961)
- Children: 3, including Stephanie Zimbalist
- Parents: Efrem Zimbalist; Alma Gluck
- Relatives: Marcia Davenport (half-sister)
- Military career
- Allegiance: United States
- Branch: United States Army
- Service years: 1941–1945
- Rank: 2nd Lieutenant
- Units: Company L, 3rd Battalion, 60th Infantry Regiment
- Conflicts: World War II; European theatre; Battle of Normandy; Battle of Hürtgen Forest

Efrem Zimbalist Jr. (November 30, 1918 – May 2, 2014) was an American actor and theatre producer. Known for his "mellifluous voice and air of sophistication," he was known to television audiences for his starring roles on the crime drama series 77 Sunset Strip (1958–64) and The F.B.I. (1965–74), his recurring role as "Dandy Jim" Buckley on Maverick (1957–58), and as the voice of Alfred Pennyworth in the DC Animated Universe. He also appeared in numerous films and on the Broadway stage. He was a Golden Globe Award winner (out of four total nominations) and a two-time Primetime Emmy Award nominee.

He was the son of classical musicians Efrem Zimbalist and Alma Gluck, and the father of actress Stephanie Zimbalist. In addition to his acting career, Zimbalist was also a decorated veteran of the Second World War, receiving both the Bronze Star and Purple Heart medals. In 1994, Zimbalist received a star on the Hollywood Walk of Fame for his contributions to television.

== Early life ==
Zimbalist was born on November 30, 1918, in Brooklyn, to Jewish immigrants Efrem Zimbalist (1889–1985), a famous Russian-born violinist and symphony conductor, and Alma Gluck (1884–1938), an equally famous Romanian-born operatic soprano. He had an older sister, Mary (1915–2008), along with a half-sister from his mother's first marriage, author Marcia Davenport (1903–1996). His stepmother was Mary Louise Curtis, the founder of the Curtis Institute of Music. Both parents converted to Anglican Christianity and regularly attended the Episcopal Church. Zimbalist Jr. attended Fay School in Southborough, Massachusetts.

Zimbalist boarded at St. Paul's School in Concord, New Hampshire, taking part in school plays. He briefly attended Yale University but was expelled, reinstated and expelled a second time on account of low grades. He moved back to New York City in 1936 to work as a page for NBC radio where he had small on-air roles as well as presenting shows. He furthered his acting training at Neighborhood Playhouse before serving in the United States Army during World War II, where he became friends with writer and director Garson Kanin.

=== Military service ===
Zimbalist was drafted in 1941. Inducted into the United States Army, he completed his initial training at Fort Dix, New Jersey. Selected for officer candidate school, after graduation in 1943 he received his commission as a second lieutenant of Infantry. Zimbalist was assigned as a platoon leader in Company L, 3rd Battalion, 60th Infantry Regiment, 9th Infantry Division and participated in combat in Europe following the Normandy landings. He was discharged at the end of the war, and his awards and decorations included the Bronze Star Medal and Combat Infantryman Badge, in addition to the Purple Heart he received for a shrapnel wound to his leg during the battle of Hürtgen Forest.

== Career ==
=== Early career ===
Following the war, Zimbalist returned to New York and made his Broadway acting debut in The Rugged Path, starring Spencer Tracy. This led to a stage career as both actor and producer. His producing successes included bringing three Gian Carlo Menotti operas to Broadway, one of which, The Consul, won the Pulitzer Prize for Music in 1950.

In 1954–1955, he co-starred in his first television series, Concerning Miss Marlowe.

=== Warner Bros. star ===
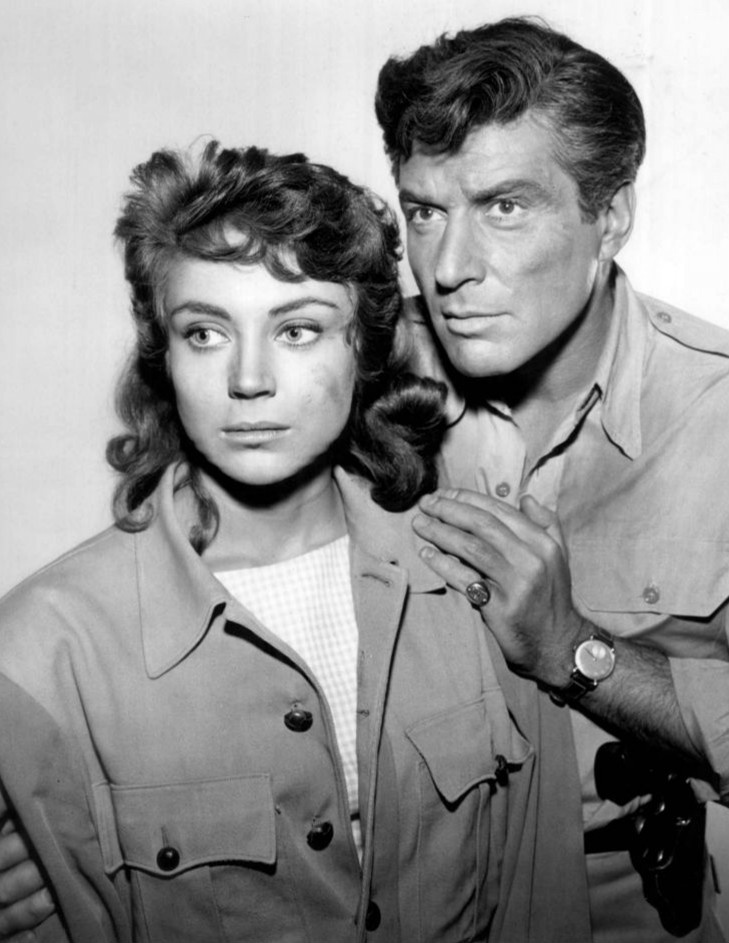
Andra Martin and Zimbalist in 77 Sunset Strip, 1960

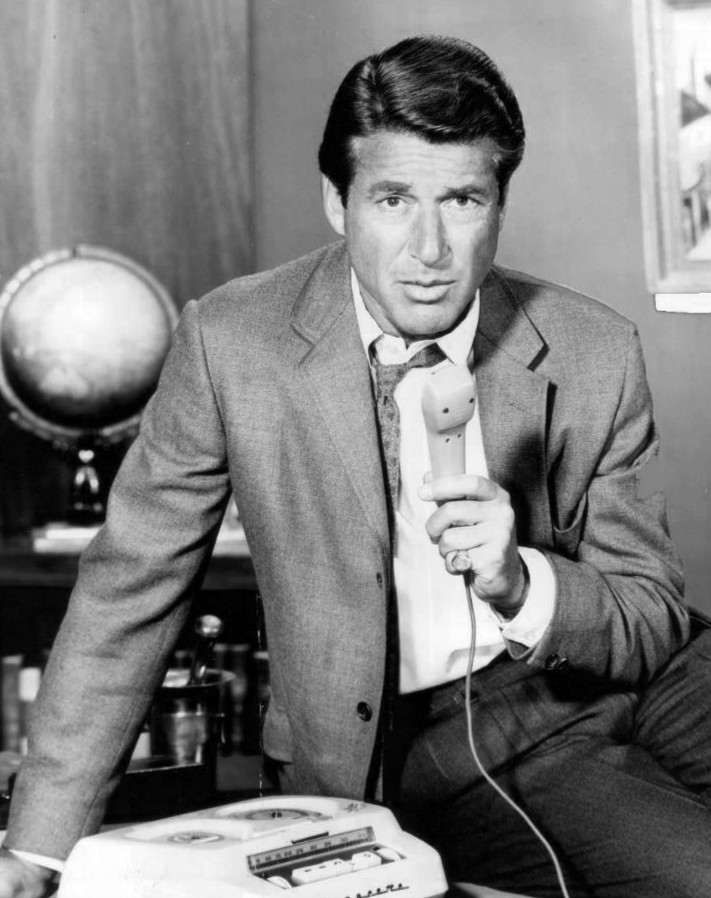
Zimbalist in 77 Sunset Strip, 1963

In 1956, Zimbalist was put under contract by Warner Bros. and moved to Hollywood. Zimbalist's first recurring role in a Warner Bros. Television series was as roguish gambler "Dandy Jim Buckley" on Maverick, opposite James Garner in 1957, and making five appearances as the character. In 1958, Zimbalist played the co-lead Stuart "Stu" Bailey in 77 Sunset Strip, a popular detective series running until 1964.

During this period, he made several concurrent appearances in other Warner Bros. television shows, such as Hawaiian Eye, The Alaskans, and Bronco. He also starred as the lead in several feature films for Warners, such as Bombers B-52, The Deep Six, A Fever in the Blood and The Chapman Report. Zimbalist was in such demand during this time that he was given a vacation by Jack L. Warner, owing to exhaustion from his busy schedule.

Jack Warner lent him to Columbia Pictures for By Love Possessed in exchange for adding several years to his Warners' contract, but he refused to let Zimbalist appear in BUtterfield 8 for Metro-Goldwyn-Mayer.

In 1959, he was awarded the Golden Globe for "Most Promising Newcomer – Male".

=== The F.B.I. television series ===
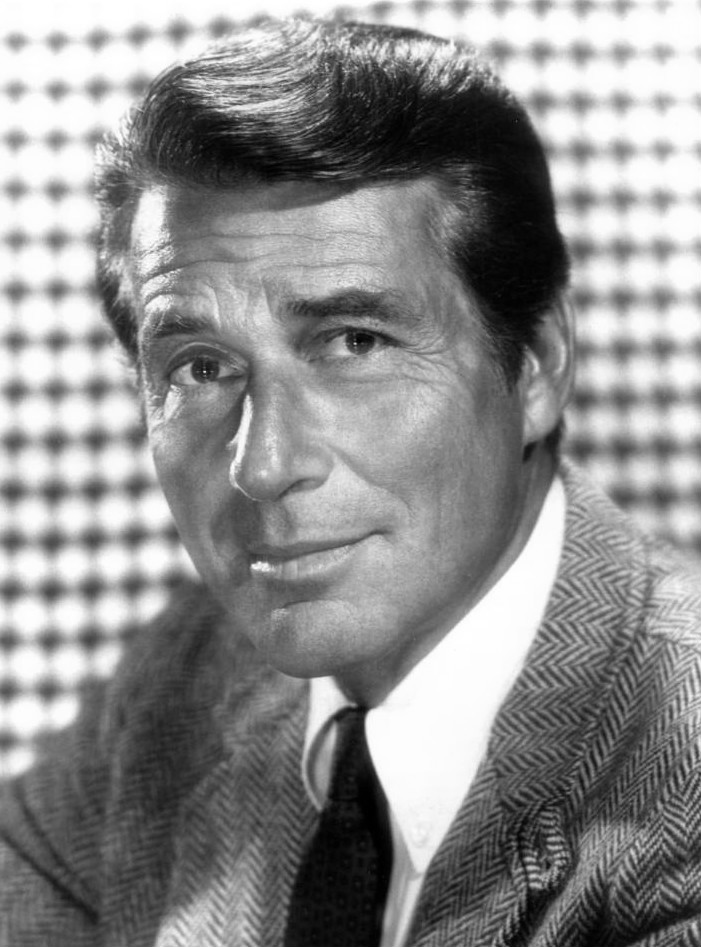
1971 publicity photo of Zimbalist on The F.B.I.

Apart from 77 Sunset Strip, Zimbalist was most widely known for his starring role as Inspector Lewis Erskine in the Quinn Martin television production The F.B.I., which premiered on September 19, 1965, and aired its final episode on April 28, 1974. Zimbalist was generous in his praise of producer Martin and of his own experience starring in the show. Those who worked with him were equally admiring of the star's professionalism and likable personality.

Zimbalist maintained a strong personal relationship with FBI director J. Edgar Hoover, who requested that the show be technically accurate and portray his agents in the best possible light, and he insisted actors playing FBI employees undergo a background check. Zimbalist subsequently spent a week in contact with Hoover in Washington, D.C., and at the FBI Academy in Quantico, Virginia. The men remained mutual admirers for the rest of Hoover's life. Hoover held up Zimbalist as a model for FBI employees' personal appearance.

The Society of Former Special Agents of the Federal Bureau of Investigation honored the character of Lewis Erskine in 1985 with a set of retired credentials, and on June 8, 2009, FBI Director Robert Mueller presented Zimbalist with a plaque honoring him for his work on the series.

The show was revived in the 1980s as Today's FBI starring Mike Connors.

=== Other television work ===
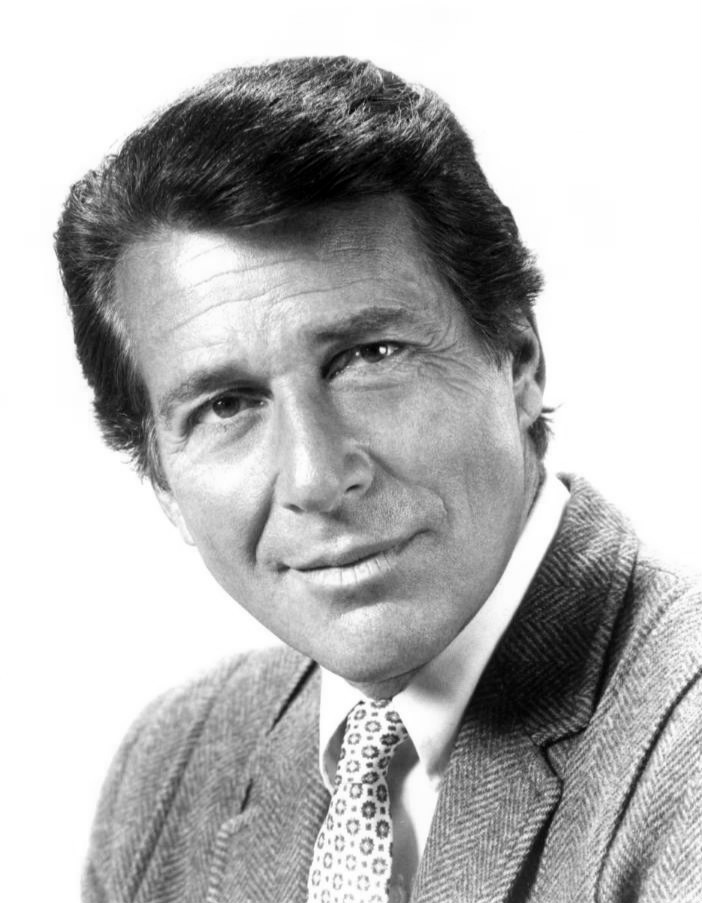
Zimbalist in 1972

After 77 Sunset Strip, Zimbalist appeared in other series, including CBS's short-lived The Reporter starring Harry Guardino as journalist Danny Taylor of the fictitious New York Globe. He also appeared in leading and supporting roles in several feature films, including Harlow, A Fever in the Blood (a film about a ruthless politician), Wait Until Dark and Airport 1975.

Zimbalist had a recurring role as Daniel Chalmers, a white-collar con man, on his daughter Stephanie Zimbalist's 1980s television detective series Remington Steele. He also recurred in the television dramatic series Hotel.

In 1990, Zimbalist portrayed the father of Zorro in the Christian Broadcasting Network's The New Zorro. Zimbalist relinquished the role after the program's first season because of the filming at studios outside Madrid, Spain, and the role subsequently went to Henry Darrow. He had a small recurring role in the 1990s hit science fiction television series Babylon 5 as William Edgars.

Also in the 1990s, Zimbalist voiced Alfred Pennyworth in Batman: The Animated Series. He reprised the role in subsequent media set in the DC Animated Universe, including Superman: The Animated Series, The New Batman Adventures, Justice League, and Static Shock. He said being Alfred had "made me an idol in my little grandchildren’s eyes.” Zimbalist also played villain Doctor Octopus in Spider-Man: The Animated Series. He appeared on the Trinity Broadcasting Network and as himself in the 1998 Smithsonian Institution production of Gemstones of America. He performed as the narrator in "Good Morning, America" by Elinor Remick Warren.

Zimbalist wrote an autobiography, My Dinner of Herbs, published by Limelight Editions, New York.

In 2008, Zimbalist appeared in the short film The Delivery, in which he played a professor who helps a young girl in her struggles for literacy. The film won first place in fantasy at the Dragon*Con Film Festival and was an official selection at the Los Angeles International Children's Festival and the Reel Women International Film Festival in 2009.

== Personal life ==
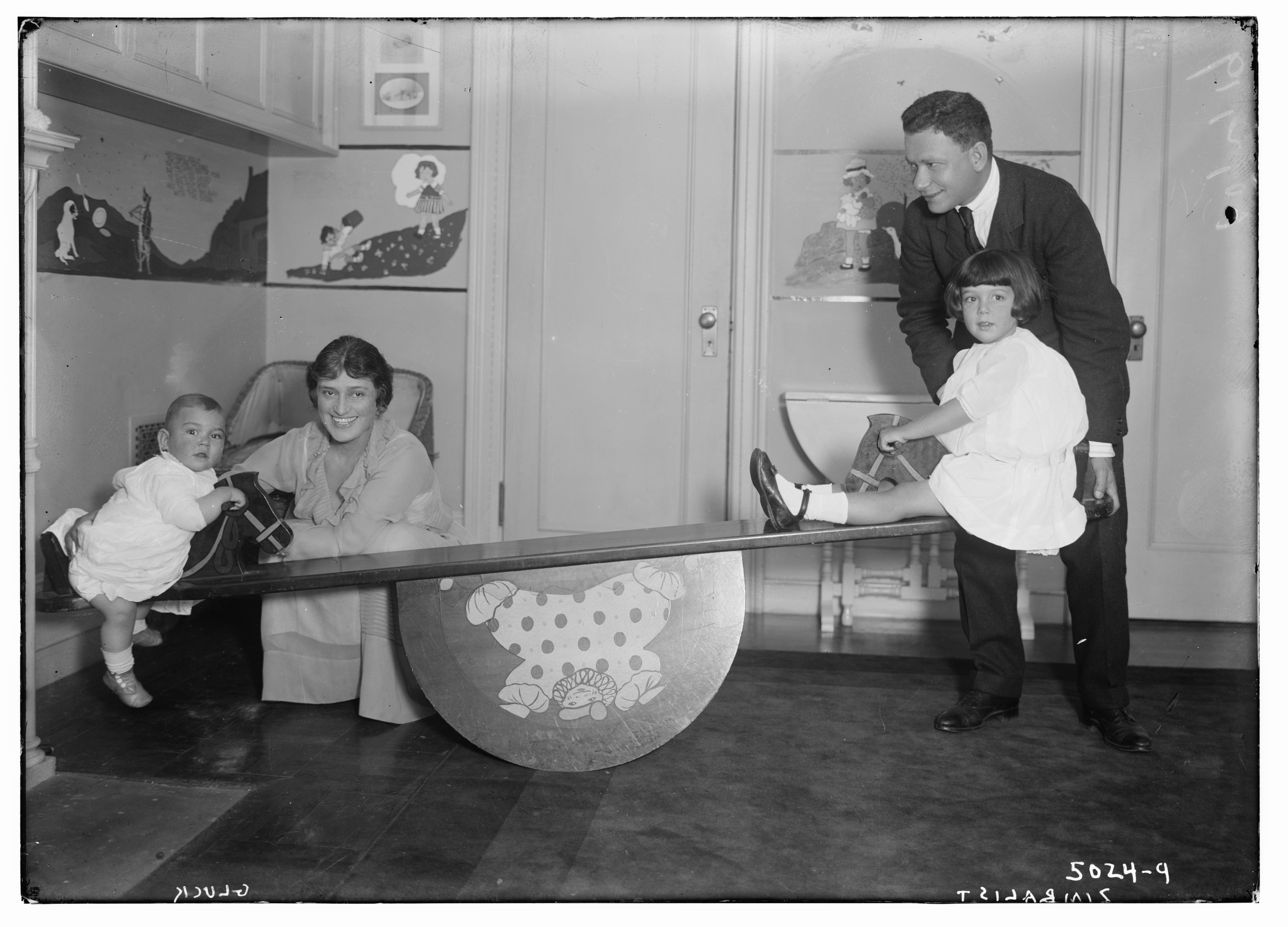
Efrem's parents, Alma Gluck and Efrem Zimbalist Sr., 1915

In December 1941, Zimbalist married Emily Munroe McNair. They had two children, Efrem "Skip" Zimbalist III (b. 1947) and Nancy (1944–2012). In January 1950, Emily died from cancer.

On February 12, 1956, at New Hartford, Connecticut, Zimbalist married Loranda Stephanie Spalding, daughter of Francis Lecompte Spalding, United States Consul General in Seville, Spain, and a granddaughter of Edgar L. G. Prochnik, former Austrian Minister to the United States. They had a daughter, future actress Stephanie Zimbalist. In December 1961, AP News reported that Mrs Zimbalist had gained an uncontested divorce in Los Angeles, testifying that her husband had shown her "little love or affection" in five years of marriage.

On February 5, 2007, Loranda died from lung cancer, aged 73.

=== Religious beliefs ===
Zimbalist's parents, Alma Gluck and Efrem Zimbalist, were of Jewish descent but, on emigrating to America, had left the religion. Moreover, Efrem Zimbalist stated, "As far as I am concerned, there has been no Jew in the family for sixty-five years."

Zimbalist was baptized in the Episcopal Church. He said that when growing up he was taken to church every Sunday. He attended St. Paul's School, an Episcopal boarding school in New Hampshire. Zimbalist said his faith gave him comfort when Emily died.

He had a nine-year association with the practice of Transcendental Meditation as taught by Maharishi Mahesh Yogi. Zimbalist described the Maharishi Yogi as a "fascinating character", but found the meditation method "... was a total waste of energy for me."

In the late 1970s, he was drawn to the Charismatic Christianity movement. His first association was with Jim Bakker and Tammy Faye Bakker's PTL ministry. For several years, he was a member of the PTL board. PTL's principal televangelistic successor, the Trinity Broadcasting Network (TBN), engaged Zimbalist to make its many announcements, including the station's idents every half hour, which aired between 1992 and 2012. In a five-minute segment called "The Word" aired on TBN at 25 minutes after the hour, Zimbalist would read a verse from the Bible, eventually completing the entire text, verse by verse. He later distanced himself from Charismatic Christanity, saying in 1989, "for a while I did go overboard in my association with a fundamentalist group".

In later life, Zimbalist joined the congregation of an Episcopal parish near to his home. Afterward he joined the Anglican Church of Our Savior in Santa Barbara; he was an occasional reader there and requested donations be made to them (among others) in his obituary.

=== Political views ===
In 1963 and 1964, Zimbalist joined fellow actors William Lundigan, Chill Wills and Walter Brennan in making appearances on behalf of U.S. Senator Barry Goldwater, the Republican candidate, in his election campaign against U.S. President Lyndon B. Johnson.

== Death ==
Zimbalist died at the age of 95, on May 2, 2014, from natural causes.

== Filmography ==
=== Film ===
Year	Title	Role	Notes	Refs
1949	House of Strangers	Tony Monetti	Film noir directed by Joseph L. Mankiewicz	
1957	Band of Angels	Lt. Ethan Sears	Romantic drama film directed by Raoul Walsh.	
1957	Bombers B-52	Colonel Jim Herlihy	CinemaScope film directed by Gordon Douglas.	
1958	The Deep Six	Lt. Blanchard	World War II drama film directed by Rudolph Maté, loosely based on a novel of the same name by Martin Dibner.	
1958	Too Much, Too Soon	Vincent Bryant	Biographical film directed by Art Napoleon.	
1958	Violent Road	George Lawrence	Remake of The Wages of Fear and directed by Howard W. Koch.	
1958	Girl on the Run	Stuart Bailey		
1958	Home Before Dark	Jacob 'Jake' Diamond	Drama film directed and produced by Mervyn LeRoy.	
1960	The Crowded Sky	Dale Heath	Drama film directed by Joseph Pevney.	(Note: In Airport 1975, both Efrem Zimbalist Jr. and Dana Andrews reprised their roles, but in a reversal, Andrews does the crashing.)
1961	A Fever in the Blood	Judge Leland Hoffman	Drama film directed by Vincent Sherman.	
1961	By Love Possessed	Arthur Winner	Drama film directed by John Sturges.	
1962	The Chapman Report	Paul Radford	Drama film directed by George Cukor.	
1965	Harlow	William Mansfield	Fictionalized drama based on the life of film star Jean Harlow directed by Alex Segal.	
1965	The Reward	Frank Bryant	Western film directed by Serge Bourguignon.	
1967	Wait Until Dark	Sam Hendrix	Psychological thriller film directed by Terence Young.	
1974	Airport 1975	Captain Stacy	Air disaster film and the first sequel to the successful 1970 film Airport and directed by Jack Smight.	
1982	The Avenging	Jacob Anderson	Drama film written and directed by Lyman Dayton.	
1991	Hot Shots!	Wilson	Comedy spoof film of Top Gun directed and co-written by Jim Abrahams.	
1993	Jack L. Warner: The Last Mogul	Narrator	Documentary film directed and written by Gregory Orr.	
1993	Batman: Mask of the Phantasm	Alfred Pennyworth (voice)	Animated superhero mystery film directed by Eric Radomski and Bruce Timm (co-written).; Also known as Batman: The Animated Movie	
1995	The Street Corner Kids: The Sequel	Makenzie	Family film directed and written by Margaret Raphael.	
1998	Batman & Mr. Freeze: SubZero	Alfred Pennyworth (voice)	Direct-to-video superhero animated feature film directed, co-written, and co-produced by Boyd Kirkland.	
1999	The Amazing Adventures of Spider-Man	Doctor Octopus	Animated short film directed and co-written by Scott Trowbridge.	
2003	Batman: Mystery of the Batwoman	Alfred Pennyworth (voice)	Direct-to-video animated film directed by Curt Geda.	
2008	The Delivery	Dr. Engel	Short film directed and written by Gabrielle DeCuir., (final film role)	

=== Television ===
Year	Title	Role	Notes	Refs
1946	Mr. and Mrs. North	Star	Television film	
1954–1955	Concerning Miss Marlowe	Jim Gavin	Contract role	
1956	Star Tonight	Guest	Episode: "The Long View"	
1956	The United States Steel Hour	Sean O'Neill	Episode "Stopover at Sublimity"	
1957	Conflict	Stuart Bailey	2 episodes	
1957–1958	Maverick	Dandy Jim Buckley	Recurring	
1958	Girl on the Run	Stuart Bailey	Television film	
1958	Sugarfoot	Kerrigan the Great	Episode: "The Wizard"	
1958–1964	77 Sunset Strip	Stuart Bailey	Contract role; 163 episodes	
1959–1962	Hawaiian Eye	Stuart Bailey	Recurring	
1960	The Alaskans	John Conrad	Episode: "The Trial of Reno McKee"	
1961	Person to Person	Himself	Episode:"August 11, 1961"	
1961	Bronco	Edwin Booth	Episode: "The Prince of Darkness"	
1961	What About Linda?	Himself	March of Dimes fund raising program	
1962	Here's Hollywood	Himself	November 2, 1962	
1964	The Hollywood Palace	Himself	Episode: "Host: Efrem Zimbalist Jr."	
1964	Bob Hope Presents the Chrysler Theatre	Paul Radford	Episode: "The Sojourner"	
1964	The Alfred Hitchcock Hour	Stranger	Episode: "See the Monkey Dance"	
1964	The Reporter	Charles Durwood	Episode: "Super-Star"	
1965	Rawhide	Jeff McKeever	Episode: "The Diehard"	
1965	Password	Himself	Episode: "Angie Dickinson vs. Efrem Zimbalist Jr."	
1965–1974	The F.B.I.	Inspector Lewis Erskine	Contract role; 241 episodes	
1967	Cosa Nostra, Arch Enemy of the F.B.I.	Inspector Lewis Erskine (archive footage)	Television film	
1967	Insight	Byron	Episode: "Stranger In My Shoes"	
1969	Insight	Jim	Episode: "The Coffee House"	
1970	Insight	Bergman	Episode: "The Day God Died"	
1970	Insight	Don Ford	Episode: "He Lived With Us, Ate With Us, What Else, Dear?"	
1970	Insight	Charles de Foucauld	Episode: "The Hermit"	
1972	The Tonight Show Starring Johnny Carson	Himself	February 16, 1972	
1974	Insight	Guest	Episode: "When You See Arcturus"	
1975	Who Is the Black Dahlia?	Sgt. Harry Hansen	Television film	
1978	A Family Upside Down	Mike Long	Television film	
1978	Terror Out of the Sky	David Martin	Television film	
1978	30th Primetime Emmy Awards	Himself	Presenter	
1979	The Best Place to Be	Bill Reardan	Television film	
1979	The Gathering, Part II	Victor Wainwright	Television film	
1979	Insight	God	Episode: "Checkmate"	
1979	Insight	Guest	Episode: "A Family of Winners"	
1980	Scruples	Ellis Ikehorn	Miniseries	
1980	The Anita Bryant Spectacular	Himself		
1982	Beyond Witch Mountain	Aristotle Bolt	Television film	
1982	Family in Blue	Marty Malone	Television film	
1983	Insight	Guest	Episode: "The Hit Man"	
1983	Fantasy Island	Mr. Baldwin	Episode: "The Butler's Affair/Roarke's Sacrifice"	
1983	Charley's Aunt	Col. Francis Chesney	Television film	
1983	Baby Sister	Tom Burroughs	Television film	
1983	Shooting Stars	Robert Cluso	Television film	
1983–87	Remington Steele	Daniel Chalmers	Recurring	
1984	The Love Boat	Dan Whitman	Episode: "Polly's Poker Palace"	
1984	Hardcastle and McCormick	Emmett Parnell	Episode: "The Georgia Street Motors"	
1984	Partners in Crime	Grant Latham	Episode: "Murder in the Museum"	
1984	Hotel	Alexander Heath	Episode: "Flesh and Blood"	
1984	Cover Up	E.G. Dawson	Episode: "Writer's Block"	
1984	You Are the Jury	Narrator	Episode: "The Case of the People of Florida v Joseph Lamdrum"	
1985	Finder of Lost Loves	Judge Alex Hale	Episode: "Mister Wonderful"	
1986	38th Primetime Emmy Awards	Himself	Presenter: Outstanding Supporting Actor in a Miniseries or a Special	
1986	You Are the Jury	Narrator	Episode: "The State of Arizona v Dr. Evan Blake"	
1986–88	Hotel	Charles Cabot	Recurring	
1988	Hunter	Clarence Hyland	Episode: "Murder He Wrote"	
1988	Murder, She Wrote	Gen. Havermeyer	Episode: "The Last Flight of the Dixie Damsel"	
1990	Zorro	Don Alejandro de la Vega	Contract role; 25 episodes	
1990	Who's the Boss?	Robert Robinson	Episode: "Operation Mona"	
1990	Murder, She Wrote	Richard Thompson Grant	Episode: "Hannigan's Wake"	
1991	Hot Shots: The Making of an Important Movie	Himself		
1992	Murder, She Wrote	Adam Quatrain	Episode: "Sugar, Spice, Malice and Vice"	
1992–1993	The Legend of Prince Valiant	King Arthur (voice)	Contract role; 53 episodes	
1992–1995	Batman: The Animated Series	Alfred Pennyworth (voice)	Contract role; 57 episodes	
1993	Trade Winds	Christof Philips	Miniseries	
1994	Vicki!	Himself		
1994	Burke's Law	Sam Gallagher	Episode: "Who Killed the Legal Eagle?"	
1994	Heaven Help Us	Lexy's Dad	Episode: "A Little Left of Heaven"	
1994	The Nanny	Theodore Timmons	Episode: "Material Fran"	
1995	Biker Mice from Mars	King Arthur	Episode: "Knights of the Round Table"	
1995	One West Waikiki	Walter Mansfield	Episode: "Flowers of Evil"	
1995	Gargoyles	Mace Malone	Episode: "Revelations"	
1995	Iron Man	Justin Hammer (voice)	Recurring	
1995–1997	Spider-Man: The Animated Series	Doctor Octopus / Otto Octavius (voice)	Recurring	
1996	Picket Fences	Hal Klosterman	Episode: "Forget Selma"	
1996	Mighty Ducks	Dr. Denton P. Hookerman	Episode: "Zap Attack"	
1997	Babylon 5	William Edgars	Recurring	
1997	The Visitor	Wayland Scott	Episode: "Miracles"	
1997	Superman: The Animated Series	Alfred Pennyworth (voice)	Episode: "World's Finest"	
1997–1998	The New Batman Adventures	Alfred Pennyworth (voice)	Recurring	
1998	Gemstones of America	Himself	Host	
1999	A Year to Remember	Himself	Host	
2001	The First Day	Benjamin Hart	Television film	
2003	Static Shock	Alfred Pennyworth (voice)	Episode: "Hard as Nails"	
2003–2004	Justice League	Alfred Pennyworth (voice)	3 episodes	
2004	Batman: Behind the Mystery	Himself		
2004	TVLand Moguls	Himself		
2007	The Brothers Warner	Himself	Historical film directed by Cass Warner (credited as Cass Warner Sperling).	

=== Video games ===
Year	Title	Role	Refs
1993	Gabriel Knight: Sins of the Fathers	Wolfgang	
2000	Spider-Man	Doctor Octopus	
2001	Batman: Vengeance	Alfred Pennyworth	

=== Video ===
Year	Title	Role	Notes	Refs
1983	The Tempest	Prospero	Directed by William Woodman.	

== Theatre ==
Opening date	Closing date	Title	Role	Theatre	Refs
Nov 10, 1945	Jan 19, 1946	The Rugged Path	Gil Hartnick	Plymouth	
Nov 6, 1946	Feb 21, 1947	King Henry VIII	Duke of Suffolk	International Theatre	
Nov 8, 1946	Feb 15, 1947	What Every Woman Knows	A Butler, Ensemble	International Theatre	
Dec 19, 1946	Feb 22, 1947	A Pound on Demand; Androcles and the Lion	Secutor	International Theatre	
Feb 27, 1947	Mar 15, 1947	Yellow Jack	Aristides Agramonte	International Theatre	
May 1, 1947	Nov 1, 1947	The Telephone; The Medium	(producer)	Ethel Barrymore Theatre	
Feb 24, 1948	Mar 6, 1948	Hedda Gabler	Eilert Lovborg	Cort Theatre	
Dec 7, 1948	Jan 9, 1949	The Telephone	(producer)	City Center	
Dec 7, 1948	Jan 9, 1949	The Medium	(producer)	City Center	
Mar 15, 1950	Nov 4, 1950	The Consul	(producer)	Ethel Barrymore Theatre	
Jan 17, 1956	Aug 11, 1956	Fallen Angels	Maurice Duclos	Playhouse	
Oct 16, 2004	Nov 7, 2004	Night of the Iguana	Nonno	Rubicon Theatre Company	
Apr 26, 2007	May 20, 2007	Hamlet	The Player King	Rubicon Theatre Company	

== Sources ==
- Abbott, Jon (2009). Stephen J. Cannell Television Productions: A History of All Series and Pilots. Jefferson, North Carolina: McFarland & Company. p. 165. ISBN 978-0-7864-5401-3.
- Coursen, Herbert R. (2010). Contemporary Shakespeare Production (Studies in Shakespeare). Pieterlen, Bern: Peter Lang International Academic Publishers. p. 127. ISBN 978-1-4331-0924-9.
- Etter, Jonathan (2008). Quinn Martin, Producer: A Behind-the-Scenes History of QM Productions and Its Founder. Jefferson, North Carolina: McFarland & Company. pp. 62–87. ISBN 978-0-7864-3867-9.
- Garcia, Frank; Phillips, Mark (2012). Science Fiction Television Series, 1990–2004: Histories, Casts and Credits for 58 Shows. Jefferson, North Carolina: McFarland & Company. p. 21. ISBN 978-0-7864-6917-8.
- Kessler, Ronald (2003). The Bureau: The Secret History of the FBI. New York City: St. Martin's Press. p. 399. ISBN 978-0-312-98977-4.
- Malan, Roy (2004). Efrem Zimbalist: A Life. Milwaukee, Wisconsin: Amadeus Press. pp. 1 and 139–142. ISBN 1-57467-091-3.
- Marill, Alvin H. (2011). Television Westerns: Six Decades of Sagebrush Sheriffs, Scalawags, and Sidewinders. Lanham, Maryland: Scarecrow Press. p. 57. ISBN 978-0-8108-8132-7.
- Monush, Barry (2003). Encyclopedia of Hollywood Film Actors, Vol. 1: From the Silent Era to 1965. Milwaukee, Wisconsin: Applause Theatre and Cinema Books. p. 816. ISBN 978-1-55783-551-2.
- Neibaur, James L. (2004). The Bob Hope Films. Jefferson, North Carolina: McFarland & Company. p. 178. ISBN 978-0-7864-1050-7.
- Roberts, Jerry (2009). Encyclopedia of Television Film Directors. Lanham, Maryland: Scarecrow Press. pp. 90 & 383. ISBN 978-0-8108-6138-1.
- Silversten, Linda (1998). Lives Charmed: Intimate Conversations with Extraordinary People. Deerfield Beach, Florida: HCI Books. pp. 173–194. ISBN 978-1-55874-593-3.
- Terrace, Vincent (2013). Television Introductions: Narrated TV Program Openings since 1949. Lanham, Maryland: Scarecrow Press. pp. 79 and 121–122. ISBN 978-0-8108-9249-1.
- Terrace, Vincent (2013a). Encyclopedia of Television Pilots: 1937–2012. Jefferson, North Carolina: McFarland & Company. pp. 15 and 331. ISBN 978-0-7864-7445-5.
- Terrace, Vincent (2013b). Television Specials: 5,336 Entertainment Programs, 1936–2012. Jefferson, North Carolina: McFarland & Company. pp. 33 and 90. ISBN 978-0-7864-7444-8.
- Terrace, Vincent (2011). Encyclopedia of Television Shows, 1925 through 2010, 2nd ed. Jefferson, North Carolina: McFarland & Company. p. 1011. ISBN 978-0-7864-6477-7.
