= Edd Byrnes =

American actor and singer (1932–2020)

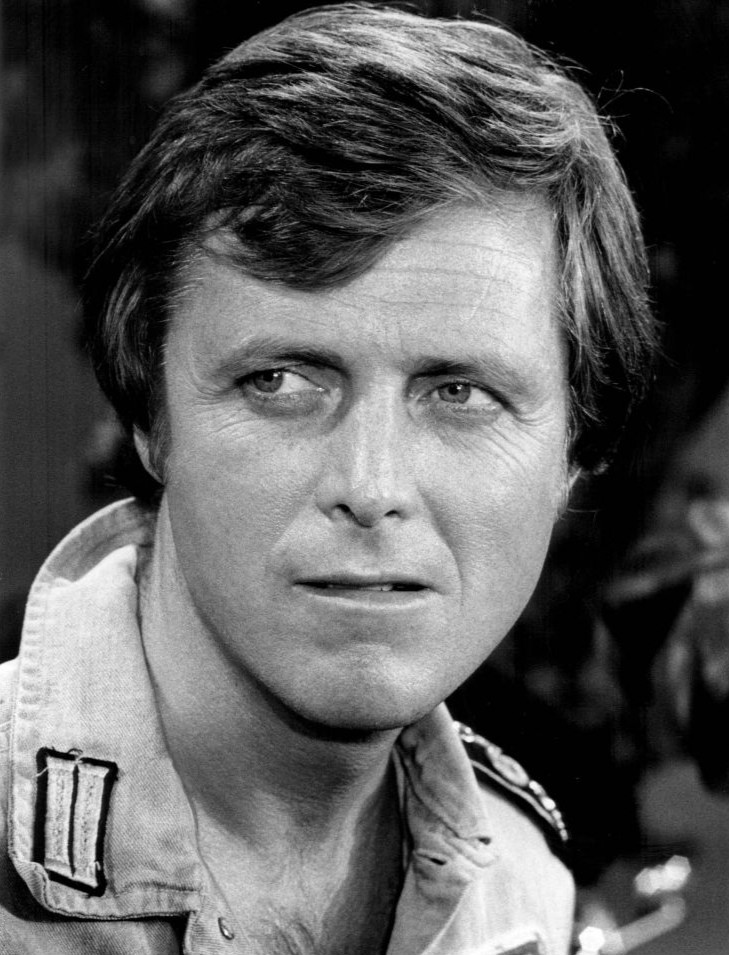
- Byrnes in 1973 in a guest appearance on The Sonny & Cher Comedy Hour
- Born: Edward Byrnes Breitenberger; July 30, 1932; New York City, U.S.
- Died: January 8, 2020 (aged 87); Santa Monica, California, U.S.
- Occupations: Actor, singer
- Years active: 1956–1999
- Spouse: Asa Maynor (m. 1962; div. 1971)
- Children: 1

Edward Byrne Breitenberger (July 30, 1932 – January 8, 2020), known professionally as Edd Byrnes, was an American actor and singer best known for his starring role as Kookie in the television series 77 Sunset Strip (1958–1964). He also charted a Billboard 100 recording, "Kookie, Kookie (Lend Me Your Comb)", with Connie Stevens (1958). He was featured in the 1978 film Grease as TV dance show host Vince Fontaine.

== Early life ==
Byrnes was born in New York City, the son of Mary (née Byrne) and Augustus "Gus" Breitenberger. He had two siblings, Vincent and Jo-Ann. After his abusive alcoholic father died when Edd was 13, he dropped his last name in favor of Byrnes, based on the name of his maternal grandfather Edward Byrne.

Byrnes developed the urge to act in high school but did not seriously consider pursuing it until after he had tried a number of other jobs, such as driving an ambulance, roofing and selling flowers. At age 17, he found work as a photographer's model.

== Career ==
=== Early acting career ===
In 1956, Byrnes got an unpaid job in a summer stock theatre company in Connecticut, the Litchfield Community Playhouse. He soon began appearing in the company's plays as an actor; he also tried to get roles in Broadway theatre productions, but had no luck. Also that year, he was cast in an episode of the Crossroads TV program. Byrnes also appeared in episodes of the late-1950s series Wire Service and Navy Log.

After a year, Byrnes moved to Hollywood. He appeared in a stage production of Tea and Sympathy. Byrnes also appeared in episodes of The Adventures of Jim Bowie, and Telephone Time and in the film Fear Strikes Out (1957). Byrnes was third-billed in the low-budget exploitation film Reform School Girl (1957) for American International Pictures, co-starring Sally Kellerman. That same year, he had a supporting role in the Warner Bros. film Johnny Trouble.

In 1957, Byrnes signed a three-year contract with John Carroll of Clarion Pictures. He tested for roles in the films Bernardine and Until They Sail but was unsuccessful. He did, however, guest star on an episode of Cheyenne made by Warner Bros., and a contemporary report described him as "a Tab Hunter type.". The studio liked Byrnes' work and signed him to a long-term contract in May 1957.

=== Warner Bros. ===
Warners started off Byrnes' contract by assigning him to a comic role in the war drama The Deep Six (1958). He also appeared in episodes of Cheyenne, The Gale Storm Show: Oh! Susanna and Colt .45. In 1958 he appeared (credited as Edward Byrnes) as Benji Danton on Cheyenne in the episode titled "The Last Comanchero."

When Tab Hunter refused a role in the war film Darby's Rangers (1958), Byrnes stepped in instead. He was wanted for Baby Face Nelson (1957), but Warners would not loan him out.

Byrnes also appeared in the romantic drama Marjorie Morningstar (1958) and Life Begins at 17 (1958). He appeared in the pilot episode of Lawman and as a guest star in Maverick, The Deputy, and Sugarfoot, in the latter with John Russell, Rodolfo Hoyos Jr., and Will Wright in the 1958 season-premiere episode "Ring of Sand." He was in another war film titled Up Periscope (1959).

=== 77 Sunset Strip ===
Byrnes was cast in Girl on the Run, a pilot for a detective show starring Efrem Zimbalist Jr. Byrnes played contract killer Kenneth ("Kookie") Smiley, who continually combed his hair – Byrnes said this was an idea of his which the director liked and kept in. Around this time Byrnes decided to change his acting name from "Edward" to "Edd". "I just dreamed it up one day", he said. "Edward is too formal and there are lots of Eddies."

The show aired in October 1958 and was so popular Warners decided to turn it into a TV series: 77 Sunset Strip. Byrnes' character became an immediate national teen sensation, prompting the producers to make Byrnes a regular cast member. They transformed Kookie from a hitman into a parking valet at Dino's Lodge who helped as a private investigator. Zimbalist Jr. explained the situation to the audience:

We previewed this show, and because Edd Byrnes was such a hit, we decided that Kookie and his comb had to be in our series. So this week, we'll just forget that in the pilot he went off to prison to be executed.

— From the pre-credit sequence for the episode "Lovely Lady, Pity Me"

Kookie's recurring character—with a different, exciting look that teens of the day related to—was the valet-parking attendant who constantly combed his piled-high, Brylcreemed hair, often in a windbreaker jacket, and who worked part-time at the so-called Dean Martin's Dino's Lodge restaurant, next door to a private-investigator agency at 77 Sunset Strip in West Hollywood. Kookie frequently acted as an unlicensed, protégé detective who helped the private eyes (Zimbalist and Roger Smith) on their cases, based upon "the word" heard from Kookie's street informants. Kookie called everybody "Dad" (as in "Sure thing . . . Dad") and was television's homage to the "Jack Kerouac" style of cult-hipster of the late 1950s.

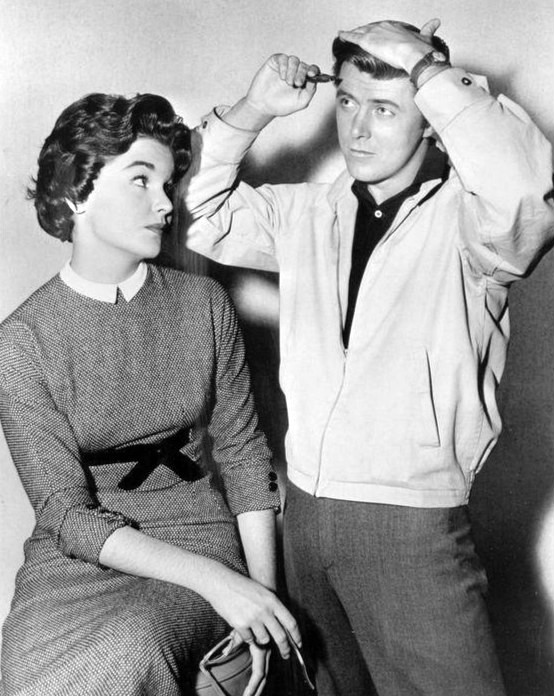
Byrnes as Kookie with Sue Randall (c. 1963)

The show became the most popular one in the country. To the thrill of teen viewers, Kookie spoke a jive-talk "code" to everyone, whether you understood him or not, and Kookie knew, better than others, "the word on the street". Although the Kookie character was at least several years older than Jim Stark, James Dean's character in the film Rebel Without a Cause, Byrnes exuded a similar sense of cool. Kookie was also the progenitor of Henry Winkler's The Fonz character of the Happy Days series (switch hot rod for motorcycle; same hair and comb). By April 1959, Byrnes was among the most popular young actors in the country.

"I was a nobody", said Byrnes. "Now I'm dragging in over 400 letters a week and I'm a name."

Kookie's constant onscreen tending of his ducktail haircut led to many jokes among comedians of the time, and it resulted in the 1959-charted (13 weeks) 'rap' style recording, "Kookie, Kookie (Lend Me Your Comb)", recorded with actress and recording artist Connie Stevens, and which reached No. 4 on the Billboard Hot 100. It sold over one million copies and was awarded a gold disc by the RIAA. The song also appeared on the Edd Byrnes album, entitled Kookie. He and Stevens appeared together on ABC's The Pat Boone Chevy Showroom. During the run of 77 Sunset Strip, Byrnes, as the "Kookie" character, was a popular celebrity, and Byrnes received fan-mail that reached 15,000 letters a week, according to Picture Magazine in 1961; this rivalled most early rock recording-stars of the day.

=== Clashes with Warners ===
Warners put him in the second lead of a Western, Yellowstone Kelly (1959), supporting Clint Walker, star of another Warners show, Cheyenne; it was a minor success at the box office.

"I'm not studying", said Byrnes at the time. "Why should I? I get all my experience in front of the camera. You get in front of the camera every day and you've got to learn."

Byrnes walked off the show in the second season, demanding a bigger part and higher pay. In November 1959, Warners put him on suspension. They eventually offered $750 a week but he refused. In April 1960, they came to terms and Byrnes went back to work.

Owing to restrictions in his Warner Brothers television contract, Byrnes was forced to turn down film roles in Ocean's Eleven (1960); Rio Bravo (1959); North to Alaska (1960) and The Longest Day (1962). He tested for the role of John F. Kennedy in PT 109, but President Kennedy preferred Cliff Robertson.; instead of making that movie, he guest starred on Lawman.

Byrnes made a cameo as Kookie in Surfside Six and Hawaiian Eye, a 77 Sunset Strip spin-off. He bought a story for Warners, Make Mine Vanilla, but it was not made. He threatened to punch a photographer who was trying to take a photo of him getting a marriage license. He did some summer stock in 1962 with his wife.

Although Byrnes was a popular celebrity, typecasting led him to ultimately buy out his television contract with Warner Brothers to clear his way for films—but it was too late for Byrnes to capitalize on feature-length cinema projects based upon his established television-series fame.

=== Post-Warner Bros. ===
In August 1963 Byrnes bought up the remaining ten months of his contract with Warner Bros. and left Sunset Strip. "No more hipster image for me", said Byrnes. "From now on I'd like to establish myself as a movie star."

Byrnes appeared in episodes of The Alfred Hitchcock Hour; Burke's Law and Kraft Suspense Theatre. He travelled to Yugoslavia where he was one of several names in Roger Corman's ensemble war film The Secret Invasion (1964). While in Europe he signed to do a TV show in Munich.

Back in the United States, he made a pilot for a TV series, Kissin' Cousins, based on the Elvis Presley film Kissin' Cousins (1964), with Byrnes taking the part of the lieutenant played by Presley in the film; it did not go to series. Byrnes starred in a beach party movie financed by Corman, Beach Ball (1965). While working on Beach Ball with Byrnes, Chris Noel complained about his behavior. He was in episodes of Mister Roberts; Honey West and Theatre of Stars, and did Picnic; Bus Stop; Sunday in New York; Sweet Bird of Youth and Cat on a Hot Tin Roof on stage in stock.

The shadow of Kookie hung over him. "People think that's the only role you can play", he said in 1966. "Producers and directors still think of me as the kid I played on the Strip. I've been offered other series but they've still wanted to cast me as the same kid."

Byrnes returned to Europe for several Spaghetti Westerns, which included the 1967 films Renegade Riders; Any Gun Can Play and Red Blood, Yellow Gold. In 1969 he said he made more money in the preceding year than in his entire time at Warner Bros.

Back in the US he worked mostly in TV; this included episodes of Mannix; Love, American Style; The Virginian; Adam-12 and Pathfinders. He was also in the TV movies The Silent Gun (1969), starring Lloyd Bridges, and The Gift of Terror (1973), starring Denise Alexander and Will Geer. Byrnes had a supporting role in the Duo-Vision horror film Wicked, Wicked in 1973, starring Tiffany Bolling, and played a TV interviewer in the David Essex film Stardust (1974).

In 1974, Byrnes hosted the pilot of Wheel of Fortune, but NBC chose Chuck Woolery instead. In his autobiography, Byrnes acknowledged being intoxicated during the pilot's taping.

He was a guest star in Marcus Welby, MD; Thriller; Police Story; Police Woman and Sword of Justice; and was also in the TV movies Mobile Two (1975) and Telethon (1977).

=== Grease ===
Byrnes played a small but memorable role of the Dick Clark-like dance-show host Vince Fontaine, host of National Bandstand, in the 1978 movie Grease.

The box office success of the film led to Byrnes becoming the only regular cast member of the NBC comedy-drama anthology series $weepstake$ in early 1979, but it only lasted nine episodes. He went back to guest starring in shows like CHiPs, B.J. and the Bear, House Calls, Charlie's Angels, Vega$, The Love Boat, Fantasy Island, Quincy M.E., The Master, Simon & Simon, and Crazy Like a Fox.

=== Later career ===
Byrnes had a small role in the Erin Moran TV film Twirl (1981) and the lead in Erotic Images (1983) with Britt Ekland. Byrnes also appeared in Mankillers (1987); Back to the Beach (1987); Party Line (1988) and Troop Beverly Hills (1989).

Later appearances included parts in: Unhappily Ever After; Rags to Riches; Mr. Belvedere; Empty Nest; Burke's Law (the revival); Adam-12, Kung Fu: The Legend Continues and Murder, She Wrote. In 1987 he appeared on the sitcom Throb in the role of Bobby Catalina, a washed-up singer, and performed his trademark "Kookie" song. In 1992, he played a fictionalized version of himself on Married... with Children, being a celebrity endorser for a time share and singing a revamped version of "Kookie" with the thrash metal band Anthrax. The episode and his appearance were well-received.

One of his final TV roles was a small role in the mini-series Shake, Rattle and Roll: An American Love Story (1999).

== Personal life and death ==
Byrnes died of natural causes on January 8, 2020, at his Santa Monica home. He was 87 years old. His body was cremated.

Byrnes's son, Logan, from his marriage to Asa Maynor, is a television news anchor for KUSI-TV News in San Diego, California.

== Legacy ==
As a tribute to his enduring celebrity and his iconic "Kookie" character, Byrnes has ranked No. 5 in TV Guide's list of "TV's 25 Greatest Teen Idols" (23 January 2005). In 1996, he wrote an autobiography with Marshall Terrill titled Kookie No More.

Byrnes appeared during the Memphis Film Festival in June 2014; he was reunited with his former Yellowstone Kelly co-star Clint Walker.

== Filmography ==
- Fear Strikes Out (1957) as Boy in Car Assisting Jimmy Up Stairway (uncredited)
- Reform School Girl (1957) as Vince
- Johnny Trouble (1957) as Elliott
- Maverick (1957–1960, TV Series) as Stableboy / Wes Fallon in the episode: "Stage West"/ The Kid
- Cheyenne (1957–1958, TV Series) as Clay Rafferty / Benji Danton (as Edward Byrnes)
- Sugarfoot (1957–1961, TV Series) as Borden in "Ring of Sand"
- The Deep Six (1958) as Rescue Seaman (voice, uncredited)
- Darby's Rangers (1958) as Lt. Arnold Dittman
- Marjorie Morningstar (1958) as Sandy Lamm
- Life Begins at 17 (1958) as Jim Barker
- Girl on the Run (1958) as Kenneth Smiley
- Up Periscope (1959) as Pharmacist Mate Ash
- Yellowstone Kelly (1959) as Anse Harper
- The Secret Invasion (1964) as Simon Fell
- Beach Ball (1965) as Dick Martin
- Honey West (1965–66, TV series) as Robin Hood in the episode "Little Green Robin Hood"
- Any Gun Can Play (1967) as Clayton – the Banker
- Red Blood, Yellow Gold (1967) as 'Chattanooga Jim'
- Renegade Riders (1967) as 'Stuart'
- The Silent Gun (1969, ABC Movie of the Week) as Joe Henning
- Wicked, Wicked (1973) as Henry Peter 'Hank' Lassiter
- Adam-12 (09/13/1972, TV Series) as Skinner
- Stardust (1974) as TV Interviewer
- Thriller British TV Series (1975 season 4 episode 6) as Eddie Valance
- Grease (1978) as Big John Badyin
- $weepstake$ (TV series) as The $weepstake$ M.C. (9 episodes)
- Erotic Images (1983) as Logan Roberts
- Back to the Beach (1987) as Valet
- Mankillers (1987) as Jack Marra
- Party Line (1988) as Maitre d'
- Troop Beverly Hills (1989) as Ross Coleman
- Married... with Children (1992) as a prospective neighbor to Al and Peg
- Murder She Wrote (1993) as Freddie Major
- Shake, Rattle and Roll: An American Love Story (1999, TV Movie) as Bobby Icovella (final film role)
