= Andra Martin =

American actress (1935–2022)

Andra Hildur Martin
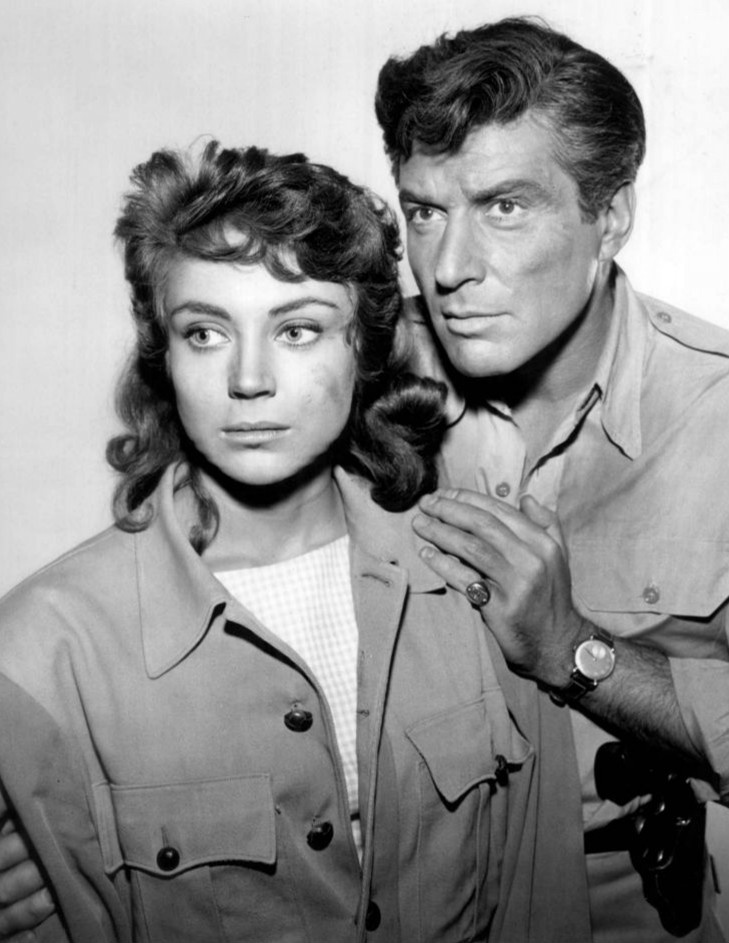
- Martin with Efrem Zimbalist Jr. in 1960
- Born: Sandra Rehn; July 15, 1935; Rockford, Illinois, U.S.
- Died: May 3, 2022 (aged 86)
- Occupation: Actress
- Years active: 1956–1963
- Notable work: The Thing That Couldn't Die, Up Periscope, Yellowstone Kelly
- Spouses: Ty Hardin (m. 1958; div. 1960); David May II (m. 1962; div. 1968); Philip M. Stein (m. 1970)
- Children: 2 (with Hardin)

Andra Martin (born Sandra Rehn, July 15, 1935 – May 3, 2022) was an American actress who appeared in many television series and a few movies as a contract player for Warner Bros. in the late 1950s and early 1960s.

== Early years ==
Martin was born Sandra Hildur Rehn, the daughter of Mr. and Mrs. Herbert Walter Rehn. She grew up near Rockford, Illinois, on her parents' farm, graduated from Monroe Center High School, and studied dramatics for two years at Northwestern University.

From there, she went to New York City and worked as a model while she studied acting under Lee Strasberg. She honed her acting skills in the summer playhouse at Eagles Mere, Pennsylvania.

== Career ==
Martin's film debut came in Street of Sinners (1957). The Lady Takes a Flyer (1958) was the first film in which she was billed as Andra Martin.

Martin was James Garner's leading lady in the 1959 film Up Periscope and the daughter/secretary on the Perry Mason TV-series episode "The Case of the Prodigal Parent". She also played the role of defendant Arlene Ferris in the 1961 episode, "The Case of the Waylaid Wolf".

Martin played Wahleeah, a captive American Indian maiden, who became the love interest of Clint Walker in Yellowstone Kelly (1959) and appeared in various Warner Bros. Television series, including Maverick in the episodes "Gun-Shy" with James Garner as Bret Maverick, "Hadley's Hunters" with Jack Kelly as Bart Maverick, and "Thunder from the North" (1960) with Roger Moore as Beau Maverick. She also guest-starred as a leading lady in series such as The Alaskans with Roger Moore, 77 Sunset Strip with Efrem Zimbalist Jr., Colt .45 with Wayde Preston, Bourbon Street Beat, Hawaiian Eye with Robert Conrad, Surfside Six, Bronco with Ty Hardin, Lawman with John Russell, and Cheyenne with Clint Walker.

She appeared in other television series such as Bachelor Father with John Forsythe and Wagon Train.

== Personal life ==
Politically, Martin identified as a "Conservative Republican". She stated that she voted for Eisenhower in the 1956 United States presidential election, which was the first time she had ever voted, and for Barry Goldwater in the 1964 United States presidential election. In both the 1968 and 1972 United States presidential elections, she campaigned for Richard Nixon. She said the only time she ever voted for a Democrat was in 1960, when she voted for John F. Kennedy.

On August 30, 1958, Martin married actor Ty Hardin in North Hollywood, California, despite the objections of their respective agents. They were the parents of twin sons born October 24, 1959. The couple divorced in June 1960.

On June 23, 1962, she married David May II, heir to the May Department Stores Company. They were divorced in 1968.

In 1970, she married Philip Stein, and they remained together for the rest of her life.

Martin died on May 3, 2022, at the age of 86.
