= The Deep Six =

1958 film directed by Rudolph Maté

- Theatrical release poster
- Directed by: Rudolph Maté
- Written by: Harry Brown; Martin Rackin; John Twist
- Based on: The Deep Six; 1953 novel by Martin Dibner
- Produced by: Martin Rackin; Alan Ladd
- Starring: Alan Ladd; Dianne Foster; William Bendix
- Cinematography: John F. Seitz
- Edited by: Roland Gross
- Music by: David Buttolph
- Color process: Warnercolor
- Production company: Jaguar Productions
- Distributed by: Warner Bros. Pictures
- Release date: January 15, 1958
- Running time: 108 minutes
- Country: United States
- Language: English

The Deep Six is a 1958 American World War II drama film directed by Rudolph Maté, loosely based on a novel of the same name by Martin Dibner. The film stars Alan Ladd, who co-produced it, William Bendix, Dianne Foster, Keenan Wynn, James Whitmore, Ross Bagdasarian and Efrem Zimbalist Jr. It also marked the film debut of Joey Bishop. It was distributed by Warner Bros. Pictures.

The storyline depicts the conflicts of a U.S. naval officer in combat during World War II with his destroyer shipmates and his conscience over the values instilled in him by his Quaker upbringing.

== Plot ==
In September 1942, during World War II, Susan Cahill (Dianne Foster), art director for an ad agency on Madison Avenue run by her fiancé, is jealous of his business flirtation with a client's daughter to secure a deal. She accepts an invitation to dinner on Long Island from agency artist Alexander "Alec" Austen (Alan Ladd). Susan is disturbed by Alec's obvious feelings for her, but accepts a lunch date the next day anyway. After she leaves, Alec receives a telegram to report for active duty in the U.S. Navy but decides not to tell Susan as their relationship grows. Just before reporting for duty, Alec takes Susan home to meet his mother, a Quaker, revealing to them his hope to marry Susan—and his call up. His mother is hurt that Alec did not disclose his military obligation and saddened that he has disregarded the pacifist tenets of his upbringing. Susan admits she loves Alec, but will not break her engagement.

Alec reports aboard his ship, the destroyer USS Poe, at the Brooklyn Navy Yard, with no one to see him off as it departs for San Francisco. The ship's captain, Cmdr. Meredith (James Whitmore), quickly takes a shine to Alec and he is befriended by his roommate and the ship's doctor, Lt. Blanchard (Efrem Zimbalist Jr.), who soon realizes Alec is "carrying a torch" for Susan. However, the ship's executive officer, Lt. Comdr. Edge (Keenan Wynn), has an immediate dislike of Alec's Quaker background and objects to his assignment as assistant gunnery officer. Alec introduces himself to the sailors in the gunnery division, catching them gambling but overlooking the offense. Chief Petty Officer "Frenchy" Shapiro (William Bendix) congratulates Alec for the way he handled the situation but receives a gentle warning that they best not repeat it. The two become close friends despite their differences in rank when Frenchy reveals that he became estranged from his wife because of his Navy duty. Underway, the ship picks up three survivors from a sunken German submarine, but when Blanchard and Alec attempt to treat them humanely, Edge angrily intervenes. He accuses Alec of being less than a man because he cannot hate, but Alec assures him that he can.

In San Francisco, Alec begins drawing a portrait of his Frenchy to give to his daughter. The captain gives Alec a five-day liberty to meet Susan, who has come to California after Blanchard contacted her. They agree to marry immediately and travel to Pebble Beach to stay with Susan's sister, who unfortunately receives notification that her husband has been killed in action. Alec decides to return to the ship and marry Susan only upon his safe return from duty. At sea in the Aleutian Islands, when an aircraft is spotted approaching the ship, the gunners plead for orders to open fire but Alec cannot bring himself to give the command. The plane turns out to be American, apparently justifying the hesitation, but he admits to the captain that he simply froze. Although sympathetic, the captain swaps Alec's assignment with that of the damage control officer. Edge violently condemns Alec and the entire crew save Frenchy shun Alec for being a conscientious objector. During an actual Japanese air attack, a bomb crashes through the deck without exploding. With Frenchy's help, Alec throws the unexploded bomb overboard. At a funeral service for sailors killed in the air attack, the captain reminds the crew that they all might have died without Alec and Frenchy's bravery.

The ship docks at Dutch Harbor, where the navy seamen quarrel with those from the Merchant Marine. Alec tries to intervene and is knocked to the ground by a merchant mariner. Mocked for apparently "turning the other cheek," Alec defends himself but is accidentally knocked unconscious by Frenchy when a brawl begins. He admits to Blanchard that he felt an angry urge to kill, but Blanchard reassures him that his response was natural. Alec volunteers to lead a dangerous mission ashore to rescue stranded airmen and their reconnaissance photos of the Japanese-held island, joined by Frenchy and several members of the crew. They link up with the airmen, but cut off along the beach by Japanese soldiers, Alec orders his men to open fire and calls the ship for fire support. Frenchy is forced to kill a Japanese soldier shooting at them when Alec cannot bring himself to fire his own weapon. As Frenchy openly pities his friend, four enemy soldiers emerge and Frenchy is wounded. Alec kills them to protect his friend and is also wounded, but Frenchy dies before they make it back to the ship. Soon after, Alec returns to Susan with Frenchy's completed portrait to deliver to his daughter.

== Cast ==
- Alan Ladd as Alexander "Alec" Austen
- Dianne Foster as Susan Cahill
- William Bendix as "Frenchy" Shapiro
- Keenan Wynn as Lieutenant Commander Mike Edge
- James Whitmore as Commander Warren Meredith
- Efrem Zimbalist Jr. as Lieutenant Blanchard
- Ross Bagdasarian as Private Aaron Saboujian
- Joey Bishop as "Ski" Krokowski
- Peter Hansen as Lieutenant Dooley
- Perry Lopez as Al Mendoza
- Jerry Mathers as Steve Innes (uncredited)

== Production ==
=== Development ===
The novel was published in 1953 and became a bestseller.

Rights to the novel were bought by Ladd's Jaguar Productions in 1955. The film was always envisioned as a starring vehicle for Ladd; possible co-stars included Fredric March and Edward G. Robinson. Eventually, William Bendix was cast in the role.

At one point, Doris Day was announced as the film's female lead as part of a three- picture deal to be made over three years; she and Ladd would co-star in two films. This did not happen, however, and Dianne Foster was cast instead.

The Deep Six was to be the first of a ten-picture deal between Jaguar and Warner Bros. to be made over three years. Ladd wanted to use Jaguar to develop new talent and hoped to showcase them in the film.

=== Screenplay ===
The screenplay incorporated several subplots (primarily the portraits created by Austen) and characters/back stories from Dibner's 1953 novel, but the plot of the film largely focused on Alec Austen's spiritual crisis of pacifism versus duty, which in the novel did not occur. Likewise the screenplay, except for the issue of abuse of authority by some officers, did not address the major themes of the novel: the clinging by the regular navy chain of command early in the war to archaic customs and traditions that proved detrimental to morale and endangered ships in combat; racial discrimination; sadistic criminal acts, including homosexual rape, by officers and sailors who served in the pre-war Navy; and the assignment in a hurriedly expanded wartime navy of incompetent or marginally qualified regular officers to positions of trust and authority. In the novel the executive officer, an Annapolis-trained senior officer, has a mental breakdown even though higher authority knew from his abusive behavior that he should not be serving on a ship in combat, and commits suicide during battle. The climactic battle scene of the novel, a large scale surface action closely resembling the Battle of the Komandorski Islands, in the film became a minor land skirmish involving Austen's shore party during a rescue attempt.

Characters' traits and motivations were altered to match the personalities of the actors cast in the roles, or as in the case of Kennan Wynn's character, were a composite of two major characters.

=== Shooting ===
Filming started 15 April 1957.

Jerry Mathers is seen in an uncredited role as one of the children of Susan's sister. At the time, Mathers starred in the television series Leave It to Beaver

The film transformed the novel's light cruiser Atlantis (the fictional counterpart of the USS Richmond), a ship with a skipper who loathes the sea and a crew of dispirited castoffs, into the destroyer Poe.

During filming in June and July 1957 in Long Beach, California, the Poe was portrayed by the USS Stephen Potter, a World War II era destroyer still serving but scheduled to be "mothballed" in early 1958. Its configuration was altered to resemble its wartime appearance, including removal of modern radar and the installation on the fantail of 20mm gun mounts. Maté used most of the ship's complement as shipboard extras, rotating a few at a time on a daily basis and praising their cooperation and abilities. As a result, the credits mention "The Officers and Men of the U.S.S. Stephen Potter".

== Reception ==
Howard H. Thompson of The New York Times wrote in his review: "Unfortunately, having stated its case—the hero's mental conflict—this Warners release then sidesteps the issue almost to the finale. The loose, rambling result brims with clichés, at the expense of dramatic unity and, finally, conviction. And going by some bright dialogue in the John Twist–Martin Rackin–Harry Brown script, and Rudolph Mate's erratic direction, there is ample evidence that the parties responsible knew better."

== Home media ==
The Deep Six was released was released on DVD on February 13, 2013, by Warner Home Video as part of their Warner Archive Collection.
