= The Deep Six (novel) =

1953 novel by Martin Dibner

- First edition
- Author: Martin Dibner
- Language: English
- Publisher: Doubleday & Co, New York
- Publication date: 1953
- Publication place: United States
- Media type: Print
- Pages: 321

The Deep Six is a 1953 novel by Martin Dibner (1911-1992) describing the experiences of a group of U.S. Navy sailors fighting in the Aleutian Islands Campaign in 1943 during World War II. The novel, based on the author's experiences serving in the light cruiser USS Richmond during the same campaign, is written in a terse Hemingwayesque style and was a contemporary of Nicholas Monsarrat's novel The Cruel Sea and The Caine Mutiny by Herman Wouk. The novel reached the New York Times Bestseller List for the week of September 6, 1953, ranked 16th in sales, and appeared six times on the list until October 18, fluctuating between 14th and 16th.

A third person narrative, the novel is written primarily from the point of view of Alec Austen, an artist obsessed with his painting who joins the navy to escape personal conflicts at the advertising agency at which he works. He is assigned duty as an assistant gunnery officer aboard the USS Atlantis, a light cruiser identical to Richmond. The novel explores several themes, among them abuse of authority by officers; racial discrimination; the clinging of the regular navy early in the war to archaic customs and traditions which are detrimental to morale and the safety of a ship in combat; homosexual rape aboard ship; and the assignment of incompetent or marginally qualified regular officers to positions of trust and authority in an expanded wartime navy. The second half of novel covers a 36-hour period aboard Atlantis in which all the themes come to a head, culminating in a surface battle closely resembling the Battle of the Komandorski Islands.

Motion picture rights to The Deep Six were purchased by Jaguar Productions in 1955 and became a feature film starring Alan Ladd as Austen. The film version transformed the cruiser into a destroyer and created a plot line that did not exist in the book, using Austen's Quaker background as a starting point for a theme of pacifism versus duty during war. The title is a reference to burial at sea, i.e. "given the deep six."

== Plot summary ==
During a gunnery drill aboard the light cruiser USS Atlantis, on patrol west of the Aleutian Islands, a gun barrel of a dual 40mm mount explodes, killing one member of the gun crew and seriously injuring two others. The ship's gunnery officer, Lieutenant Commander Dooley, is terrified by gunfire and accidentally breaks his leg trying to flee the vicinity after the explosion. The gun captain, Frenchy Shapiro, acts promptly to prevent further disaster by unloading the other gun. The officer in charge of the gun mount, Lieutenant (junior grade) Alec Austen, praises Shapiro in his report but avoids any hint of Dooley's cowardly behavior. The Atlantis returns to Adak to send the injured ashore and obtain a new gun barrel.

An artist in civilian life, Austen is resentful of being manipulated by Captain Meredith, the skipper of the Atlantis, into painting his portrait, since the favoritism inherent in the situation makes him perceived to be the captain's pet. At Adak the captain sends Austen ashore to pick up a new gun barrel for the 40mm but actually wants him to obtain molding for fashioning a frame for his portrait. This draws the resentment of both the ship's executive officer, jealous of Austen's access to the captain, and the officer of the deck, Ensign Mike Edge, a former enlisted man contemptuous of "trade school" reserve officers such as Austen. Austen succeeds in acquiring the picture frame but not the gun barrel because the Army general in command on Adak countermands the order for the barrel to make room on the cargo plane for a cow to provide himself with fresh milk.

The ship's surgeon, Commander Blanchard, a secret and prolific drinker, admires Austen for the humane manner in which he supervises his enlisted men. Returning together to the ship, the doctor shares a drink of whiskey with him and the freezing boat crew. Austen discovers that one of his men, Slobodjian, has jumped ship to sneak ashore with them and tries to smuggle him back aboard. Edge, however, observes them and to spite Austen, charges Slobodjian with desertion. Austen's 40mm crew is now short four men. Captain Meredith goes ashore for a social visit that night and becomes drunk, vomiting all over himself in the captain's gig. Embarrassed, he blames its crew and orders the coxswain arrested. Later a contrite Meredith is relieved that Austen was the OD and disobeyed the order.

Admiral Marcy, the task force commander, comes aboard with his staff and Atlantis sails without a replacement gun barrel. Marcy questions the capability of the old cruiser to carry out its assignment of blockading Japanese-held islands, warning Meredith that a major surface battle is likely to ensue on this patrol. The captain, who has cultivated the loyalty of his men, defends ship and crew, pointing out that recent replacements were entirely "the Navy's scum", sent to the ship in lieu of imprisonment, and that the remainder of the crew has had its morale undermined by the endless patrolling in Alaskan waters, without hope of change of mission, transfer, or a refit in the United States. In his stateroom, Austen learns from his roommate that the executive officer inspected their room as it they were still midshipmen and threatened disciplinary action. The Negro room steward changing their linen, Homer Fowler, reveals he is trained in gunnery on the 40mm and despite the racial segregation aboard ship, Austen offers him a spot on his undermanned gun crew.

Austen also receives a letter mailed months before by Stella Greyne which has just caught up to the ship. The narrative flashes back to how they met, when she was the protege of Godfrey Clemson, the owner of New York's most prestigious ad agency. They have an immediate attraction for each other and Stella, miserable over being unwilling to break free from the repugnant Clemson, falls in love with him. Austen goes to work for Clemson and has a brief affair with Stella but when he deduces that she is actually the mistress of the married Clemson, he quits to enlist in the Navy. During his officer training in Chicago, Stella steals Clemson's car and drives to see him. Austen now knows he loves Stella and asks her to end her relationship with Clemson. Stella recklessly promises to do so and Austen tells her to go to his old studio, where he has left a portrait of her he painted. In her letter, however, Stella apologizes for not having the moral fiber to leave Clemson, and Austen resolves to forget her and make painting his future life.

The executive officer intensifies his official harassment of Austen while Dooley, embarrassed by his department's poor performance during a gunnery drill for the admiral, orders Austen to exclude Fowler from the gun crew, despite the excellent marksmanship the steward demonstrated during the same drill. Outraged, Austen takes the issue to the captain, who fears that backing Austen will further harm morale and result in violence among the crew. Vacillating, he suspends the order until he can discuss it with Dooley. Just before Admiral Marcy departs, he gives the ship a combat mission and asks Meredith to find a place in his wardroom for his aide, Commander Griswold, suggesting that the executive officer "shouldn't be at sea" and hinting that the combat veteran Griswold would make an excellent replacement. Atlantis daringly conducts shore bombardment of both Japanese-occupied Attu and the Japanese base at Paramushiro in the Home Islands, restoring the crew's morale.

When they reach enemy waters, the captain tells Austen he can use Fowler as an ammunition passer, and as a gunner during actual combat, but he cannot assign him to the crew. Commander Blanchard offers Austen a drink in his quarters as commiseration, but while he is there, a boyish radioman named Gray bypasses channels and asks Blanchard to admit him to sick bay for an imagined injury. Blanchard tells him to stand his radio watch and report to sick bay afterwards. Edge confronts Gray in the passageway outside and from his position of power over him, marks him as sexual prey. Austen intervenes but sees that Gray is emotionally unstable, and is disturbed by Edge's obscene interest. He consults a veteran warrant officer who knows Edge and is warned that Edge once committed rape on another sailor, that went uninvestigated after the sailor got drunk and drowned. In the wardroom, when Austen informs Fowler of the captain's decision, a scene ensues with Dooley in which Austen loses his temper and responds insolently. The executive officer overhears the exchange and places Austen in hack. Edge tries to goad Fowler with racial slurs and Austen warns the steward to stay clear of him, recognizing that both he and Fowler are nearing the limits of their tolerance. After Austen goes to his room, Edge provokes Fowler into attacking him and stabs his hand with a screwdriver. Fowler severely beats Edge and flees when the incident is witnessed by the executive officer, who sends the master-at-arms to arrest Fowler. A search of the ship fails to find Fowler, hiding in an ammunition ready room near his gun station.

Atlantis's spotting plane is lost in the fog and unable to find the ship. Radioman Gray has a nervous breakdown and before he can be stopped, violates radio silence trying to talk to the pilot, giving away the ship's position. The gunnery department is ordered to battle stations and when the float plane is sighted, Fowler emerges from hiding and shoots it down, thinking it to be Japanese. The master-at-arms arrives and beats Fowler with his pistol, nearly killing him. Austen helps carry him to sick bay and is accused by the executive officer of deserting his battle station. Austen tells the executive officer he is tired of the abuse and is threatened with court martial. The executive officer, peevishly commanded by the captain to stand the onerous morning watch on the bridge, orders Austen to stand it with him. The executive officer asks Blanchard to support his allegation against Austen with a damning medical report. Blanchard refuses and warns the executive officer that he is hated by the entire crew and exhibiting irrational behavior.

Before his watch, Austen is asked by Frenchy to draw his portrait to send to his daughter. Frenchy decides to leave the Navy when his enlistment is over and insists on paying for the portrait with gambling winnings, which Austen accepts on the condition it be sent to Frenchy's family. The injured Edge sneaks out of his quarters, steals a pistol from a sailor on security duty, and plans to rape and kill both Fowler and Gray in the brig. On watch, the executive officer breaks down completely and insists that every crew member aboard the ship be polled to see if they hate him. The captain, listening from his sea cabin, relieves the executive officer, and orders Austen to find Edge, who has been seen prowling the ship. Edge intimidates the brig guard into opening the cell but he is thwarted when the prisoner with Fowler is not Gray but Slobodjian, who knows what Edge plans to do. He cuts Edge with a hidden knife to prevent him from using the gun. Edge hides his wound from the guard and leaves, realizing he would be unable to explain his behavior, taking refuge in a stowage compartment. Austen finds him however, and by refusing to fight Edge when challenged, breaks him down psychologically, recovering the pistol and leaving Edge to his own demons.

Austen returns to the bridge, but before he can make his report, a Japanese task force is sighted trying to run supplies past the blockade. The captain, encouraged by the support of Commander Griswold, decides to fight instead of retiring even though his force is outnumbered two-to-one. Austen goes to his battle station, where Fowler has been released from the brig to help defend the ship. Atlantis survives a desperate battle, and aided as much by luck as audacity, repels the enemy force, thanks in large part to Meredith's determination to fight. The executive officer fails to report to his battle station and is later found to have committed suicide in his room. Slobodjian, also released from the brig, is blown overboard by a near miss.

Edge's small damage control party is locked down in a flooding compartment which he cowardly tries to abandon but is prevented by Gray, in the sick bay on the other wide of the locked hatch. Ironically a hit kills everyone in the compartment except Edge, who tricks the weak-minded Gray into opening the hatch. He overpowers Gray but collapses from his previous injury. Returning with casualties, the medical party finds them, assumes that Edge rescued Gray, and Edge is mistakenly commended for bravery. A Japanese spotter plane, abandoned by the retreating task force, is shot down by Austen and Fowler but crashes into the 40mm mount, killing Fowler and Frenchy.

The Atlantis is sent to Mare Island Naval Shipyard to repair damage and Austen is detached from the ship for a month's leave before reporting to an aircraft carrier under construction. He delivers Frenchy's portrait and donations from the crew to his widow but she denies him permission to see the daughter. Resigned to the situation, he goes to the train station to travel to Maine, where he plans to paint, and finds Stella there, with her portrait in hand, waiting for him.

== Characters ==
=== Leading characters ===
- Alec Austen - Austen is a headstrong man in his mid-twenties whose parents are Quakers. While he is not, he retains the decency towards his fellow man and antipathy to violence that both, but particularly his father, instilled in him. Austen resists the efforts of superiors to make him a martinet, sometimes to the point of insubordination, and befriends the men of the Fourth Division, who are also his gun crew. In particular he becomes close to his leading petty officer. Austen handles his crew of rough, undereducated men with intelligence, resourcefulness, and tact, earning their respect, and builds a disciplined combat team. While he loves Stella Greyne, his devotion to his art provides him an alternative to her unfaithful ways.
- Stella Greyne - Stella, coming from a poor family in a small town, is beautiful (by inference; she is never described), intelligent and ambitious. Godfrey Clemson lifted her out of her poverty, changed her ethic surname to "Greyne," culturally educated her, and provides her with a plush apartment and limitless material pleasures in return for being his mistress. She finds Clemson repulsive. Stella perceives herself as a whore because she denies neither Godfrey's unwanted or Alec's welcomed sexual advances. Stella often drinks too much in a futile attempt to overcome self-loathing and a penchant for soft living and sexual temptation.
- Frenchy Shapiro - Frenchy is a Brooklyn Jew who joined the Navy eight years before to escape from and at the same time provide for a shrewish wife and a daughter with cerebral palsy. Shapiro and Austen become close friends despite their disparate backgrounds and his subordinate position as Austen's leading petty officer. Frenchy does not hesitate to fight to exert his authority, winning by outlasting his opponents. He is fiercely loyal to Austen and engenders the same from the sailors under him.
- Warrington E. Meredith - "Snooky" Meredith is a third-generation Annapolis man whose father and grandfather were both killed in combat. Meredith hates sea duty and after he accidentally ran his first command aground, was banished to shore billets that suited his need for social acceptance. He married well and enjoyed the Navy lifestyle until an unfavorable reputation among his peers compelled him to return to a sea command, which he receives just as the Atlantis arrives in the Aleutians. He is overweight, often must consult other officers before making decisions and is perceived by most as weak until he is tested in battle.
- Mike Edge - Edge is a mustang officer recently promoted from the ranks but ill-suited to the duties and responsibilities of being commissioned. Edge is a thickly built man in his early thirties, with "close set, cunning eyes." Bigoted, a martinet physically abusive of enlisted men, cowardly, and a sexual predator of young sailors, Edge is universally loathed but bluffs and bullies his way through the war until, like the captain, he is forced by events to confront his profound fears. Austen at first dismisses him as just another sailor with a coarse background, but comes to think of him as unholy and unclean.

=== Supporting characters ===
- The executive officer - The unnamed second-in-command of the Atlantis and a Regular Navy commander showing signs of severe strain, the executive officer is a "thin man with the face of a shingle," entirely humorless, with a near pathological obsession for neatness. He notes every perceived infraction by subordinate officers in a small black notebook he always carries, and uses dry sarcasm to humiliate them and enforce discipline. He tolerates Edge's crude demeanor and abusive behavior because he finds common ground in an obscene enjoyment of violence and the degrading of others. The executive officer is in denial about the hatred for him felt by the entire crew, and when informed by the surgeon of it, has a marked change in behavior for the worse.
- Commander Blanchard - Blanchard is a career Navy doctor but has little use for traditional naval discipline. Until Austen befriends him, Blanchard keeps to himself, locking the door to his stateroom and using a pharmaceutical to cleanse his breath in order to drink without being caught. Blanchard takes a not-always-welcomed protective attitude towards Austen in his struggles with the executive officer, having no fear whatsoever of his superiors. Blanchard's attempt, "man to man", to help the executive officer reduce the strain on himself is coldly rejected, and angered, Blanchard inadvertently precipitates the executive officer's breakdown. Rather than taking any other action, however, the doctor locks himself in his room again to comfort himself with a bottle.
- Godfrey Clemson - A glib art critic, Clemson parlayed his name and influence into a fortune as owner of the top advertising agency in New York. Portly and unattractive (he is described as pink-faced and not having eyelids), he wields his money and power to obtain whatever he wants, including Stella Greyne. Clemson is supercilious towards artists in general and Austen in particular. Austen characterizes him as a fast-talking salesman who happens to peddle art instead of ladies' dresses or used cars.
- Homer Fowler - Fowler, a big steward's mate, has just reported aboard Atlantis as a replacement. From the rural Deep South, he has endured years of racial discrimination and worse, learning to survive by suppressing violent urges to resist. Garrulous, he convinces Austen he is a born gunner and sees in him a protector. Working with the guns becomes the high point of his life.
- John Dooley - A "slight, troubled man," Dooley had been severely traumatized as a child by someone setting off a firecracker behind him. Rejected by the Naval Academy, Dooley became commissioned through Navy ROTC and made himself indistinguishable from an Annapolis-trained officer. In addition to his fear, he is insecure in his authority and inflexible when embarrassed. His broken leg gives him an honorable means of leaving the ship but he stubbornly remains aboard, and when battle comes, forces himself to do his job despite his fear of guns.
- Sam Griswold - Son of an admiral killed at Pearl Harbor and a hero in his own right, Griswold is a model officer, even-tempered, calm within, personally brave, and loyal to his superiors. Commanding a coastal minesweeper under air attack in the Solomon Islands, Griswold severely burned his hands when he and a black steward's mate were the only members of their crew to remain aboard and continue fighting the attacking planes. Admiral Marcy places him aboard Atlantis in tribute to his father's sacrifice, but also to provide Meredith with "backbone" in a crisis.
- Slobodjian - Slobodjian is a small, dark Armenian sailor, simple-minded but with a high degree of cunning. For the most part harmless, he is ruled by his whims with no concept of military discipline, but is well-liked by his shipmates for his congenial view of the world.
