= Saundra Edwards =

American actress and model (1938–2017)

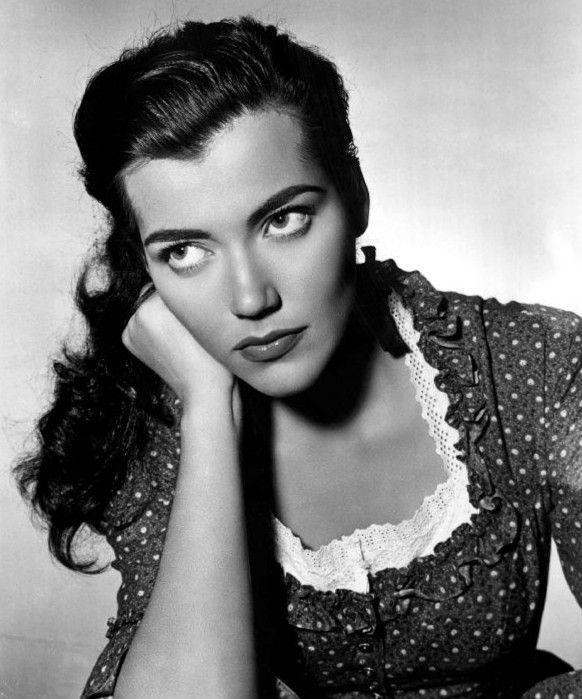
- Edwards in 1958.

Playboy centerfold appearance
- March 1957
- Preceded by: Sally Todd
- Succeeded by: Gloria Windsor

Personal details
- Born: Saundra Lee Edwards; March 12, 1938; Los Angeles, California, U.S.
- Died: June 2, 2017 (aged 79); Palm Springs, California, U.S.
- Height: 5 ft 7 in (1.70 m)

Saundra Edwards (March 12, 1938 – June 2, 2017) was an American actress and model.

== Career ==
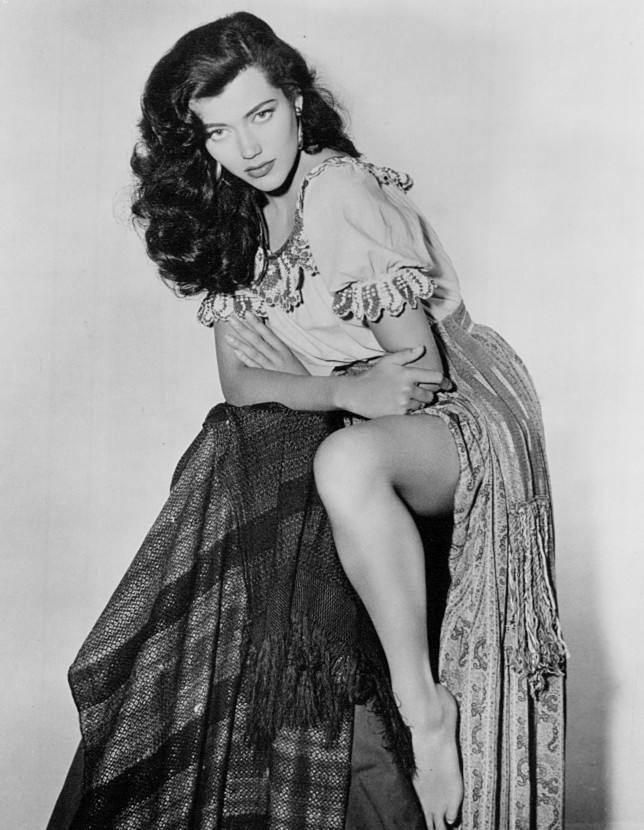
Edwards in Sugarfoot (1959)

Edwards was Playboy magazine's Playmate of the Month for the March 1957 issue. Her centerfold was photographed by Peter Gowland.

In addition to her modeling career for Playboy and other men's magazines, Edwards, who was part Cherokee, was a showgirl in Las Vegas. Her acting credits — she was a contract player at Warner Bros. — include a few films like The Crowded Sky (1960), Parrish (1961), A Fever in the Blood (1961), and many television roles in programs such as Sugarfoot, Hawaiian Eye, Cheyenne, and Maverick (in the Maverick episode "Holiday at Hollow Rock" with James Garner in 1958).

In 1958 Edwards appeared as Vardis Coll on Cheyenne in the episode titled "Dead to Rights." Also in 1958 Edwards appeared in the Cheyenne episode titled "White Warrior" as Lois Whitton opposite Clint Walker and guest Star Michael Landon, in the ending credits her name is spelled as Sandra Edwards.

In 1960 Edwards appeared as Jane Emmett on Cheyenne in the episode titled "Alibi for the Scalped Man."

== Personal life ==
Having been previously married, aged 16, to Lorin Kopp, her business manager, with whom she had a daughter, Camille, born in 1956 (a son, Steven, was born in 1959), Edwards married actor Tom Gilson on December 8, 1961, and had a son named Thomas S. Gilson Jr., who was born the same day. She separated from Gilson in August 1962 when he became abusive, after which she moved in with her sister and brother-in-law. On October 6, 1962, Edwards killed Gilson with a shotgun blast through the heart when he broke into the house where she was staying. A coroner's jury later ruled the shooting as justifiable homicide. The scandal, however, abruptly ended her acting career.

June Blair	Sally Todd	Saundra Edwards	Gloria Windsor	Dawn Richard	Carrie Radison
Jean Jani	Dolores Donlon	Jacquelyn Prescott	Colleen Farrington	Marlene Callahan	Linda Vargas
