= Kookie, Kookie (Lend Me Your Comb) =

Single by Edward Byrnes and Connie Stevens

from the album Kookie Star of "77 Sunset Strip"
- B-side: "You're the Top"
- Released: March 1959
- Genre: Novelty
- Length: 2:05
- Label: Warner Bros.
- Songwriter: Irving Taylor
- Producer: Karl Engemann

Edward Byrnes singles chronology
"Kookie, Kookie (Lend Me Your Comb)" (1959)	"Like I Love You" (1959)

Connie Stevens singles chronology
"Between the Devil and the Deep Blue Sea" (1959)	"Kookie, Kookie (Lend Me Your Comb)" (1959)	"Apollo" (1959)

"Kookie, Kookie (Lend Me Your Comb)" is a song written by Irving Taylor and performed by Edward Byrnes and Connie Stevens. The single was produced by Karl Engemann and arranged by Don Ralke, and was featured on Byrnes' 1959 album, Kookie Star of "77 Sunset Strip".

== Background ==
It was based on Byrnes' character from the television show, 77 Sunset Strip. The song is mostly spoken, except when Kookie sings the bridge section: "I've got smog in my noggin' ever since you made the scene...", and makes use of Beatnik slang. Connie continually interrupts him, asking him to lend her his comb. When he finally asks her, "What's with this comb caper, baby?...", she says she wants him to stop combing his hair and kiss her. Kookie likes the sound of that, ending up saying, "Baby, you're the ginchiest!".

== Chart performance ==
It reached No. 4 on the U.S. pop chart, No. 27 on the UK Singles Chart, and No. 30 on the U.S. R&B chart in 1959, and ranked No. 37 on Billboard's Year-End Hot 100 singles of 1959. In Canada it reached No. 6.

== Other versions ==
- Spike Jones released a version of the song on his 1960 album 60 Years of "Music America Hates Best".
- We've Got a Fuzzbox and We're Gonna Use It released a version of the song on their 1986 album The Vindaloo Summer Special.
- The band Anthrax performed an a cappella version of the song with Byrnes on an episode of the sitcom Married... with Children.

== Cultural references ==
Buying a copy of the song was the goal of the titular mummy on Bob McFadden's one hit wonder, "The Mummy," also from 1959.
