= List of Death Valley Days episodes =

Death Valley Days is an American old-time radio and television anthology series featuring true accounts of the American Old West, particularly the Death Valley country of southeastern California. Created in 1930 by Ruth Woodman, the program was broadcast on radio until 1945. From 1952 to 1970, it became a syndicated television series, with reruns (updated with new narrations) continuing through August 1, 1975. The radio and television versions combined make the show "one of the longest-running Western programs in broadcast history."

== Series overview ==
Season	Episodes	Originally released		Black & White / Color
Season	Episodes	First released	Last released	Black & White / Color
1	18	October 1, 1952	May 26, 1953	Black & White
2	18	September 29, 1953	June 17, 1954	Black & White
3	18	September 24, 1954	June 7, 1955	Black & White
4	21	1955	1956	Black & White
5	17	1956	1957	Black & White
6	25	1957	1958	Black & White
7	33	1958	1959	Black & White
8	38	1959	1960	Black & White
9	30	1960	1961	Black & White
10	26	1961	1962	Black & White
11	26	1962	1963	23 B&W, 3 Color
12	26	1963	1964	16 B&W, 10 Color
13	26	1964	1965	Color
14	26	1965	1966	Color
15	26	1966	1967	Color
16	26	1967	1968	Color
17	26	1968	1969	Color
18	26	October 2, 1969	April 24, 1970	Color
Total	452	October 1, 1952	April 24, 1970	283 B&W, 169 Color

== Episodes ==
=== Season 1 (1952–53) ===
No. overall	No. in season	Title	Directed by	Written by	Original release date
1	1	"How Death Valley Got Its Name"	Stuart E. McGowan	Ruth Woodman	October 1, 1952
A number of wagons leave a wagon train they came west with to head in a different direction than the others and head due west from Salt Lake City. They soon find themselves trapped in the hot arid desert with their supplies rapidly diminishing. Stars Brad Johnson, Phyllis Coates, Laton Reily Kirk Sr., John Parrish, Louise Lorimer, Guy Wilkerson and Bernard Szold.
2	2	"She Burns Green"	Stuart E. McGowan	Ruth Woodman	November 14, 1952
Aaron and Rosie, after months of mining in the California desert are faced with failure at mining. Rosie is ready to return to her parents home when they unexpectadely find a mineral on a dry lake bed that will make them wealthy. Stars James Griffith, Donna Martell and Allan Nixon
3	3	"The Death Valley Kid"	Stuart E. McGowan	Ruth Woodman	December 10, 1952
A bandit (Bruce Edwards) is robbing banks and businesses in a Sheriff's territory. Pressure mounts from the townsfolk on the sheriff (Richard Emory) to catch the bold bandit. Stars Ann McCrae, Walter McGrail, Jack Halliday, Bernard Szold and Jack Hardin.
4	4	"The Lost Pegleg Mine"	Stuart E. McGowan	Ruth Woodman	October 17, 1952
5	5	"The Little Bullfrog Nugget"	Stuart E. McGowan	Ruth Woodman	October 15, 1952
The only single woman in town (Gail Davis) is beleaguered by her suitors and their various ways to woo her. Stars Jimmy Lloyd, Emmett Lynn, Wade Crosby, James Seay and Hal Smith.
6	6	"Self-Made Man"	Stuart E. McGowan	Ruth Woodman	December 12, 1952
A miner loses his arm from a gunshot wound. Spurred on by his wife (Doris Merrick), he becomes a successful lawyer. Stars William Henry, House Peters Jr., Hal K. Dawson, and Steve Conti.
7	7	"The Chivaree"	Stuart E. McGowan	Ruth Woodman	January 7, 1953
A butterfly collector comes to Death Valley. Stars Tyler MacDuff, Joyce Jameson, Harry Lauter, Roy Regnier, Eula Morgan and Martin Twain.
8	8	"The Little Dressmaker of Bodie"	Stuart E. McGowan	Ruth Woodman	November 12, 1952
9	9	"Cynthy's Dream Dress"	Stuart E. McGowan	Ruth Woodman	March 3, 1953
Cynthy (Virginia Lee) loves a prospector (Brad Johnson). With Helen Brown, Steve Conti, Diahann Carroll, Kenne Duncan, Lyle Talbot, Ralph Littlefield and Timothy Carey.
10	10	"The Rival Hash Houses"	Stuart E. McGowan	Ruth Woodman	February 3, 1953
Two restaurants battle it out for the business of the miners. Stars Jane Frazee, Gordon Jones, Minerva Urecal, William Fawcett, Lyle Talbot and Rusty Wescoatt.
11	11	"The Lady with the Blue Silk Umbrella"	Stuart E. McGowan	Ruth Woodman	January 9, 1953
Two American Army Officers travel to Washington to bring back the statehood documents for California. Stars Kathy Case, Rick Vallin, Ernestine Barrier, Howard Negley, Glase Lohman, Leonard Penn, Crane Whitley, Paul Power, Keith Richards, Reed Howes, Don Anderson and Joe Dante.
12	12	"Swamper Ike"	Stuart E. McGowan	Ruth Woodman	February 3, 1953
An Indian (Jack Mahoney) looks for clues to his past while romancing a local white woman (Margaret Field). Stars Denver Pyle, Henry Rowland, Hank Patterson and Tex Terry.
13	13	"The Bell of San Gabriel"	Stuart E. McGowan	Ruth Woodman	March 17, 1953
The story of one of the bells and of the boy (Peter Votrian) who later became a padre at the mission. Stars Kathy Case, Gilbert Frye, George Lewis, Marta Mitrovich, David Leonard, Kirk Riley and Melodie McGowan.
14	14	"Claim Jumpin' Jennie"	Stuart E. McGowan	Ruth Woodman	March 31, 1953
A miner's daughter (Karen Sharpe) comes to visit, but her mother is not what she expected. Stars Irene Barton, Wallace Ford, Harry Harvey, Robert Cunningham, Charlie Stevens and Guy Wilkerson.
15	15	"The Bandits of Panamint"	Stuart E. McGowan	Ruth Woodman	March 31, 1953
Two robbers discover a rich lode of silver as they are running from the law. After selling the mine, they plan to pay back all they have stolen but are thwarted by their girlfriends. Stars Sheila Ryan, Rick Vallin, Gloria Winters, Glase Lohman, Howard Negley, George Sherwood, Greg Barton and Bob Woodward.
16	16	"Sego Lilies"	Stuart E. McGowan	Ruth Woodman	April 28, 1953
17	17	"Little Oscar's Millions"	Stuart E. McGowan	Ruth Woodman	April 28, 1953
A pair of miners buy a lot in the new town of Rawhide and sell it for a profit. Stars Percy Helton, Claire Carleton, John Frank, Helen Brown, George Norris, Beverly Cotterell, Ralph Sanford, Keith Richards, Byron Foulger and Wade Crosby.
18	18	"Land of the Free"	Stuart E. McGowan	Ruth Woodman	May 26, 1953
Two slaves come to California to earn their freedom in the gold fields. Stars James Adamson, Felix Nelson, Gail Davis, Kirk Riley, Coulter Irwin, Edythe Elliott, Willa Curtis, Frank Richards, House Peters, Jr., and Jack O'Shea.

=== Season 2 (1953–54) ===
No. overall	No. in season	Title	Directed by	Written by	Original release date
19	1	"The Diamond Babe"	Stuart E. McGowan	Ruth Woodman	September 29, 1953
A dance hall woman (Ann Savage) is disliked by the ladies of the town until she takes care of the ill during an epidemic. Stars Charles Victor, Jill Jarman, Myra McKinney, Phil Rich, Joan Danton, Leonard Penn, Dorothy Adams, Hal Smith and Reed Howes.
20	2	"Little Washington"	Stuart E. McGowan	Ruth Woodman	October 1, 1953
A young woman's (Sally Mansfield) family is uprooted when her father (John Eldridge) gets an appointment to a political position in Nevada. Stars Jim Davis, Glase Lohman and Kenne Duncan.
21	3	"Solomon in All His Glory"	Stuart E. McGowan	Ruth Woodman	October 27, 1953
A town cleans up the town drunk (James Griffith) when his beautiful sister comes to town. Stars Phyllis Coates, Leonard Penn, Gloria Winters, Jimmy Hawkins, and Coulter Irwin.
22	4	"Which Side of the Fence?"	Stuart E. McGowan	Ruth Woodman	October 29, 1953
A town on the border of California and Nevada must wait until a land survey is done to decide which state it belongs in. Stars Richard Emory, Lyn Thomas, Earle Hodgins, Hal K. Dawson, Keith Richards, James Seay and Ellye Marshall.
23	5	"Whirlwind Courtship"	Stuart E. McGowan	Ruth Woodman	November 21, 1953
Two lawyers from the same town back east compete for the good clients and future spouses. Stars Michael Hathaway, Robert Lowery, Susan Cooke, George Pembroke, Nan Leslie, Jean Wright and Russell Hicks.
24	6	"Dear Teacher"	Stuart E. McGowan	Ruth Woodman	November 24, 1953
The school kids revel in chasing teachers away, finally one comes that can control the out of control children. Stars Nancy Hale, Donna Corcoran, Michael Moore, Paul McGuire, Vivi Janiss and Geraldine Wall.
25	7	"One in a Hundred"	Stuart E. McGowan	Milton Geiger (teleplay), Ruth Woodman	October 1, 1953
26	8	"Little Papeete"	Stuart E. McGowan	Ruth Woodman	January 2, 1954
The town of Columbia, California gets a much needed fire engine. Stars Emily Heath, Richard Avonde, Regina Gleason, Hal Smith, Mark Bennett, and Kay Stewart.
27	9	"Lotta Crabtree"	Stuart E. McGowan	Ruth Woodman	January 5, 1954
The story of a little girl with a lot of talent who becomes the star of San Francisco. Stars Gloria Jean and Sharon Baird.
28	10	"Yaller"	Stuart E. McGowan	Ruth Woodman	January 30, 1954
Stars George Eldredge.
29	11	"The Twelve Pound Nugget"	Stuart E. McGowan	Ruth Woodman	January 30, 1954
30	12	"Jimmy Dayton's Treasure"	Stuart E. McGowan	Ruth Woodman	February 28, 1954
Jimmy Dayton (Harry D. Cody) falls in love with a saloon girl (Barbara Knudson). Stars Harry Lauter and Pauline Moore.
31	13	"Snowshoe Thompson"	Stuart E. McGowan	Ruth Woodman	February 28, 1954
The story of how the mail got through in the winter in California. Stars Don Kennedy as Snowshoe Thompson, with Jane Hampton, Lee Van Cleef, Heenan Elliott and Frank Richards.
32	14	"Husband Pro-Tem"	Stuart E. McGowan	Ruth Woodman	March 27, 1954
The railroad wants to make a deal with the Indians for safe passage through their land. Stars Jack Mahoney, Lane Bradford, Gloria Marshall, Hank Patterson and Lillian Culver.
33	15	"The Kickapoo Run"	Stuart E. McGowan	Ruth Woodman	April 10, 1954
Stars Fess Parker.
34	16	"Sixth Sense"	Stuart E. McGowan	Ruth Woodman	May 8, 1954
A blind woman (Jeanne Cooper) finds a career and solves a stage robbery. Stars William Hudson, Edward Ingram, Betty Shewman, Gil Frye, and Terry Frost.
35	17	"The Rainbow Chaser"	Stuart E. McGowan	Ruth Woodman	May 15, 1954
36	18	"Mr. Godiva"	Stuart E. McGowan	Ruth Woodman	June 17, 1954

=== Season 3 (1954–55) ===
No. overall	No. in season	Title	Directed by	Written by	Original release date
37	1	"The Saint's Portrait"	Stuart E. McGowan	Ruth Woodman	September 24, 1954
38	2	"11,000 Miners Can't Be Wrong"	Stuart E. McGowan	Ruth Woodman	September 25, 1954
Stars Leonard Penn and William Boyett.
39	3	"Halfway Girl"	Stuart E. McGowan	Ruth Woodman	September 24, 1954
40	4	"Black Bart"	Stuart E. McGowan	Ruth Woodman	October 26, 1954
Stars Don Beddoe.
41	5	"The Light on the Mountain"	Stuart E. McGowan	Ruth Woodman	November 12, 1954
Stars Phyllis Coates and Angie Dickinson.
42	6	"To Big Charlie from Little Charlie"	Stuart E. McGowan	Ruth Woodman	December 6, 1954
43	7	"Sequoia"	Stuart E. McGowan	Ruth Woodman	December 31, 1954
Stars Angie Dickinson and Lane Bradford.
44	8	"Lola Montez"	Stuart E. McGowan	Ruth Woodman	January 4, 1955
45	9	"The Big Team Rolls"	Stuart E. McGowan	Ruth Woodman	January 27, 1955
46	10	"Death and Taxes"	Stuart E. McGowan	Ruth Woodman	February 3, 1955
47	11	"Riggs and Riggs"	Stuart E. McGowan	Ruth Woodman	February 24, 1955
48	12	"Million Dollar Wedding"	Stuart E. McGowan	Ruth Woodman	March 1, 1955
Stars James Best.
49	13	"Love 'Em and Leave 'Em"	Stuart E. McGowan	Ruth Woodman	March 29, 1955
50	14	"The Seventh Day"	Stuart E. McGowan	Ruth Woodman	April 21, 1955
Stars Barbara Lang.
51	15	"The Mormon's Grindstone"	Stuart E. McGowan	Ruth Woodman	April 28, 1955
Stars Clark Howat and Harry Lauter.
52	16	"Death Valley Scotty"	Stuart E. McGowan	Ruth Woodman	April 29, 1955
Stars William Schallert.
53	17	"The Crystal Gazer"	Stuart E. McGowan	Ruth Woodman	June 4, 1955
Stars Natalie Norwick and Morgan Jones.
54	18	"I Am Joaquin"	Stuart E. McGowan	Ruth Woodman	June 7, 1955
Stars Jeanne Cooper.

=== Season 4 (1955–56) ===
No. overall	No. in season	Title	Directed by	Written by	Original release date
55	1	"Reno"	Stuart E. McGowan	Ruth Woodman	September 23, 1955
Stars William Schallert.
56	2	"The Valencia Cake"	Stuart E. McGowan	Ruth Woodman	September 26, 1955
57	3	"A Killing in Diamonds"	Stuart E. McGowan	Ruth Woodman	October 20, 1955
58	4	"The Homeliest Man in Nevada"	Stuart E. McGowan	Ruth Woodman	October 24, 1955
Stars Paul Wexler.
59	5	"Miracle of the Sea Gulls"	Stuart E. McGowan	Ruth Woodman	November 14, 1955
60	6	"Wildcat's First Piano"	Stuart E. McGowan	Ruth Woodman	November 21, 1955
Stars Marjorie Bennett.
61	7	"California's First Ice Man"	Stuart E. McGowan	Ruth Woodman	December 12, 1955
Stars Rhodes Reason.
62	8	"The Hangman Waits"	Stuart E. McGowan	Ruth Woodman	December 19, 1955
Stars Percy Helton and James Seay.
63	9	"Gold Is Where You Find It"	Stuart E. McGowan	Ruth Woodman	January 9, 1956
64	10	"The Man Who'd Bet on Anything"	Stuart E. McGowan	Ruth Woodman	January 16, 1956
Stars Mark Bennett and Helen Gilbert.
65	11	"The Baron of Arizona"	Stuart E. McGowan	Ruth Woodman	February 6, 1956
Stars Britt Lomond.
66	12	"Nevada's Plymouth Rock"	Stuart E. McGowan	Ruth Woodman	February 13, 1956
Stars Liam Sullivan.
67	13	"The Hoodoo Mine"	Stuart E. McGowan	Ruth Woodman	March 2, 1956
Stars Tyler MacDuff and Linda Brent.
68	14	"Mr. Bigfoot"	Stuart E. McGowan	Ruth Woodman	March 12, 1956
Stars Ann McCrea.
69	15	"Escape"	Stuart E. McGowan	Ruth Woodman	March 30, 1956
Stars Beverly Tyler.
70	16	"Two Bits"	Stuart E. McGowan	Ruth Woodman	April 7, 1956
Stars Bill Edwards.
71	17	"Bill Bottle's Birthday"	Stuart E. McGowan	Ruth Woodman	April 27, 1956
Stars Sammee Tong.
72	18	"The Sinbuster"	Stuart E. McGowan	Ruth Woodman	May 4, 1956
Stars Lyn Thomas.
73	19	"Pay Dirt"	Stuart E. McGowan	Ruth Woodman	May 25, 1956
74	20	"The Longest Beard in the World"	Stuart E. McGowan	Ruth Woodman	June 1, 1956
Stars Patricia Donahue.
75	21	"Emperor Norton"	Stuart E. McGowan	Ruth Woodman	June 15, 1956

=== Season 5 (1956–57) ===
No. overall	No. in season	Title	Directed by	Written by	Original release date
76	1	"Faro Bill's Layout"	Stuart E. McGowan	Ruth Woodman	September 14, 1956
77	2	"The Bear Flag"	Stuart E. McGowan	Ruth Woodman	September 21, 1956
78	3	"Pat Garrett's Side of It"	Stuart E. McGowan	Ruth Woodman	October 22, 1956
79	4	"The Hidden Treasure of Cucamonga"	Stuart E. McGowan	Ruth Woodman	November 5, 1956
80	5	"Loggerheads"	Stuart E. McGowan	Ruth Woodman	November 17, 1956
81	6	"The Rose of Rhyolite"	Stuart E. McGowan	Ruth Woodman	December 3, 1956
82	7	"The Last Letter"	Stuart E. McGowan	Ruth Woodman	December 8, 1956
Stars Clint Eastwood.
83	8	"Year of Destiny"	Stuart E. McGowan	Ruth Woodman	December 31, 1956
84	9	"Mercer Girl"	Stuart E. McGowan	Ruth Woodman	January 7, 1957
85	10	"California's Paul Revere"	Stuart E. McGowan	Ruth Woodman	January 28, 1957
86	11	"The Trial of Red Haskell"	Stuart E. McGowan	Ruth Woodman	February 25, 1957
87	12	"The Washington Elm"	Stuart E. McGowan	Ruth Woodman	March 4, 1957
88	13	"The Rosebush of Tombstone"	Stuart E. McGowan	Ruth Woodman	March 11, 1957
89	14	"The Luck of the Irish"	Stuart E. McGowan	Ruth Woodman	March 25, 1957
Stars William Boyett.
90	15	"Lady Engineer"	Stuart E. McGowan	Ruth Woodman	April 1, 1957
91	16	"Train of Events"	Stuart E. McGowan	Ruth Woodman	April 22, 1957
92	17	"The Man Who Was Never Licked"	Stuart E. McGowan	Ruth Woodman & Jacqueline Rhodes	April 29, 1957

=== Season 6 (1957–58) ===
No. overall	No. in season	Title	Directed by	Written by	Original release date
93	1	"California Gold Rush in Reverse"	Stuart E. McGowan	Ruth Woodman	September 30, 1957
Stars Doug McClure.
94	2	"Camel Train"	Stuart E. McGowan	Ruth Woodman	October 1, 1957
95	3	"California's First Schoolmarm"	Stuart E. McGowan	Ruth Woodman	October 12, 1957
Stars Dorothy Granger.
96	4	"Arsenic Springs"	Stuart E. McGowan	Ruth Woodman	October 14, 1957
97	5	"Fifty Years a Mystery"	Stuart E. McGowan	Ruth Woodman	October 30, 1957
98	6	"Fifteen Paces to Fame"	Stuart E. McGowan	Jacqueline Rhodes	November 7, 1957
Stars Dorothy Granger.
99	7	"The Calico Dog"	Stuart E. McGowan	Ruth Woodman	November 29, 1957
Stars Warren Frost.
100	8	"Rough and Ready"	Stuart E. McGowan	Ruth Woodman	December 7, 1957
101	9	"The Last Bad Man"	Stuart E. McGowan	Ruth Woodman	December 9, 1957
102	10	"The Greatest Scout of All"	Stuart E. McGowan	Jacqueline Rhodes	January 2, 1958
103	11	"Empire of Youth"	Stuart E. McGowan	Ruth Woodman	January 13, 1958
104	12	"Wheel of Fortune"	Stuart E. McGowan	Ruth Woodman	January 23, 1958
Stars Rickie Sorensen.
105	13	"Man on the Run"	Stuart E. McGowan	Jacqueline Rhodes	January 30, 1958
Stars Leonard Penn.
106	14	"Birth of a Boom"	Stuart E. McGowan	Ruth Woodman	January 31, 1958
Stars Roy Barcroft.
107	15	"Yankee Pirate"	Stuart E. McGowan	Ruth Woodman	February 13, 1958
Stars Ken Clark and Pamela Duncan.
108	16	"Ten in Texas"	Stuart E. McGowan	Jacqueline Rhodes	February 14, 1958
Stars Robert Fuller.
109	17	"Auto Intoxication"	Stuart E. McGowan	Ruth Woodman	February 28, 1958
Stars Raymond Hatton.
110	18	"Two-Gun Nan"	Stuart E. McGowan	Ruth Woodman	February 27, 1958
Stars Penny Edwards.
111	19	"Cockeyed Charlie Parkhurst"	Stuart E. McGowan	Ruth Woodman	March 13, 1958
112	20	"The Great Amulet"	Stuart E. McGowan	Ruth Woodman	March 14, 1958
Stars Booth Colman.
113	21	"The Telescope Eye"	Stuart E. McGowan	Ruth Woodman	March 21, 1958
Stars Slim Pickens and Richard Beymer.
114	22	"The Mystery of Suicide Gulch"	Stuart E. McGowan	Ruth Woodman	March 28, 1958
115	23	"The Big Rendezvous"	Stuart E. McGowan	Jacqueline Rhodes	April 5, 1958
116	24	"The Girl Who Walked with a Giant"	Stuart E. McGowan	Jacqueline Rhodes	April 12, 1958
Detailing the later political days of Texas Revolutionary Sam Houston (Stephen Chase), from the perspective of his young wife Margaret (Nancy Rennick).
117	25	"Jerkline Jitters"	Stuart E. McGowan	Ruth Woodman	January 4, 1958

=== Season 7 (1958–59) ===
No. overall	No. in season	Title	Directed by	Written by	Original release date
118	1	"Head of the House"	Stuart E. McGowan	Stuart E. McGowan & Jacqueline Rhodes	September 29, 1958
Stars Roy Barcroft.
119	2	"The Capture"	Stuart E. McGowan	Ruth Woodman	October 2, 1958
Stars Nancy Hale.
120	3	"Ship of No Return"	Stuart E. McGowan	Stuart E. McGowan & Jacqueline Rhodes	October 9, 1958
121	4	"The Moving-Out of Minnie"	Stuart E. McGowan	Ruth Woodman	October 13, 1958
122	5	"The Red Flannel Shirt"	Stuart E. McGowan	C. Ray Stahl & Walker A. Tompkins	October 27, 1958
123	6	"Big Liz"	Stuart E. McGowan	Ruth Woodman	October 30, 1958
Stars Hope Emerson and Percy Helton.
124	7	"Thorn of the Rose"	Stuart E. McGowan	James Bloodworth	November 10, 1958
125	8	"The Jackass Mail"	Stuart E. McGowan	Pauline Townsend	November 12, 1958
126	9	"Perilous Cargo"	Stuart E. McGowan	Dwight Newton & Harold Shumate	November 24, 1958
127	10	"The Gambler and the Lady"	Stuart E. McGowan	Tom Seller	November 27, 1958
128	11	"Quong Kee"	Stuart E. McGowan	Ruth Woodman	November 27, 1958
Stars Victor Sen Yung.
129	12	"Old Gabe"	George Archainbaud	Jerry Sackheim	December 8, 1958
Stars Harry Shannon.
130	13	"The Gunsmith"	Stuart E. McGowan	Buckley Angell	December 11, 1958
Stars Robert Fuller.
131	14	"A Piano Goes West"	Paul Landres	Turnley Walker (story) & Jerry Sackheim	January 2, 1959
Stars Britt Lomond.
132	15	"A Bullet for the Captain"	George Archainbaud	Vincent Fotre	January 3, 1959
133	16	"A Town Is Born"	George Archainbaud	Jan Leman & Ted Thomas	January 16, 1959
134	17	"Sailor on a Horse"	Paul Landres	Robert L. Joseph	January 17, 1959
Stars Robert Dix and Roy Engel.
135	18	"Gold Lake"	George Archainbaud	Budd Lesser & J.E. Selby	January 30, 1959
Stars Harry Lauter.
136	19	"Wheelbarrow Johnny"	George Archainbaud	Ruth Woodman	January 31, 1959
137	20	"Stagecoach Spy"	George Archainbaud	Gene Lesser	February 13, 1959
138	21	"Eruption at Volcano"	Paul Landres	Margaret Coffey & Tom Coffey	February 14, 1959
Stars Stephen Chase.
139	22	"Price of a Passport"	George Archainbaud	Ruth Woodman	February 27, 1959
The story of James Ohio Pattie (Donald Barton), the man who brought smallpox vaccination to Mexican-controlled California. With Rodolfo Hoyos Jr.
140	23	"Pioneer Circus"	George Archainbaud	Thomson Burtis & Maurice Zimm	February 28, 1959
Stars Johnny Carpenter.
141	24	"The Invaders"	Louis King	Jess Carneol & Kay Lenard	March 13, 1959
Stars Anthony Caruso and Harry Fleer.
142	25	"The Blond King"	Louis King	Harold Shumate	March 14, 1959
Stars Lane Bradford and Glenn Strange.
143	26	"The Newspaper That Went to Jail"	George Blair	Buckley Angell & Budd Lesser	March 27, 1959
144	27	"Old Blue"	George Archainbaud	Milton S. Gelman	March 28, 1959
145	28	"Perilous Refuge"	Stuart E. McGowan	Karl Brown (story), Lee Berg & Les Farber	April 10, 1959
146	29	"The Talking Wire"	Stuart E. McGowan	John Grey & C. Ray Stahl	April 11, 1959
Stars Morris Ankrum and James Beck.
147	30	"RX: Slow Death"	Stuart E. McGowan	George Fass & Gertrude Fass	April 24, 1959
Stars Pamela Duncan.
148	31	"Half a Loaf"	Reginald LeBorg	Maurice Zimm, with Mortimer Braus & Budd Lesser (story)	April 25, 1959
149	32	"Valley of Danger"	Stuart E. McGowan	Virginia M. Cooke	May 8, 1959
150	33	"Forty Steps to Glory"	Stuart E. McGowan	Dorrell McGowan, Howard Smith & Coles Trapnell	May 9, 1959
This is the final episode to be directed by original series director Stuart E. McGowan.

=== Season 8 (1959–60) ===
No. overall	No. in season	Title	Directed by	Written by	Original release date
151	1	"Olvera"	Daniel Dare	Arthur Rowe	October 1, 1959
Stars Cesar Romero.
152	2	"Gates-Ajar Morgan"	Charles F. Haas	Earl Baldwin	October 15, 1959
153	3	"Sam Kee and Uncle Sam"	Jesse Hibbs	Budd Lesser & Ruth Woodman	October 27, 1959
Stars Benson Fong and James Douglas.
154	4	"The Grand Duke"	Bernard L. Kowalski	Jay Leman, Budd Lesser & Ted Thomas	November 3, 1959
Stars John Lupton, Alexander Davion and Stafford Repp.
155	5	"Fair Exchange"	James Sheldon	Dorothy Schuyler & Ruth Woodman	November 13, 1959
Stars George Mitchell and Linda Watkins.
156	6	"The Scalpel and the Gun"	Nat Perrin	Max Lamb & Jerry Sackheim	November 17, 1959
Stars Lin McCarthy and John Clarke.
157	7	"Indian Emily"	Edward Ludlum	John Alexander	November 26, 1959
Stars Jolene Brand, Burt Metcalfe & Meg Wyllie.
158	8	"Hang 'Em High"	Murray Golden	Paul Franklin	November 26, 1959
Stars Paul Birch and Arthur Space.
159	9	"Tribal Justice"	John English	Alva Anderson, Bill Danch & Budd Lesser	December 10, 1959
Stars Robert Warwick and Olan Soule.
160	10	"The Little Trooper"	Nat Perrin	John Alexander	December 10, 1959
Stars Lew Gallo, John Pickard and William Schallert.
161	11	"Ten Feet of Nothing"	Francis D. Lyon	Budd Lesser	December 24, 1959
Stars James Drury, Lew Gallo, Hank Patterson and John Pickard.
162	12	"Lady of the Press"	Nat Perrin	Ruth Woodman	December 24, 1959
Stars James Franciscus, Mary Webster and James Hong.
163	13	"The Reluctant Gun"	Nat Perrin	Max Lamb, Budd Lesser & Pat Falken Smith	December 26, 1959
Stars Ross Elliott, Maggie Pierce and Alan Reed Jr.
164	14	"His Brother's Keeper"	Murray Golden	Ruth Woodman & Sid Harris	January 9, 1960
Stars Harry Townes, Alan Baxter and Bill Erwin.
165	15	"The Devil's Due"	Nat Perrin	Karl Brown	January 21, 1960
Stars Robert Knapp, June Dayton and Pamela Duncan.
166	16	"Money to Burn"	Murray Golden	Norman Jacob	January 22, 1960
Stars Lloyd Corrigan, Helen Kleeb, Paul Sorenson and William Boyett.
167	17	"Dogs of the Mist"	Nat Perrin	Ruth Woodman	February 6, 1960
Stars James Douglas.
168	18	"The Wedding Dress"	Harold D. Schuster	Karl Brown	February 13, 1960
Stars Brad Johnson, J. Pat O'Malley and Mary Webster.
169	19	"Shadow on the Window"	Murray Golden	Budd Lesser	February 18, 1960
170	20	"The Battle of Mokelumne Hill"	Murray Golden	Peral Carr	February 19, 1960
Stars H.M. Wynant.
171	21	"The Strangers"	Murray Golden	Robert Dillon & Anthony Lawrence	March 3, 1960
172	22	"Goodbye Five Hundred Pesos"	Murray Golden	John Alexander	March 3, 1960
173	23	"Forbidden Wedding"	Nat Perrin	Stuart E. McGowan & Ruth Woodman	March 17, 1960
Stars Ziva Rodann.
174	24	"One Man Tank"	Nat Perrin	Nat Tanchuck	March 17, 1960
Stars Dabbs Greer.
175	25	"Man on the Road"	Herman Hoffman	Herman Hoffman	March 30, 1960
Stars John Raitt.
176	26	"The Man Everyone Hated"	John Rawlins	Budd Lesser & Jay Rosenburg	April 1, 1960
Stars James Craig, Sonya Wilde, Ken Mayer, Ralph Moody and Linda Watkins.
177	27	"The General Who Disapproved"	Nat Perrin	Robert L. Joseph & Curtis Kenyon	April 8, 1960
Stars Howard Petrie.
178	28	"The Million Dollar Pants"	Nat Perrin	Budd Lesser	April 13, 1960
Stars Red Buttons as American businessman Levi Strauss. With Richard Carlyle and Lisa Gaye.
179	29	"Pirates of San Francisco"	Nat Perrin	Dorrell McGowan, Stuart E. McGowan & Joe Tiffenbach	April 14, 1960
Stars H.M. Wynant and Charles H. Gray.
180	30	"A Woman's Rights"	Murray Golden	Curtis Kenyon	May 1, 1960
Stars Bethel Leslie & Hope Summers
181	31	"Eagle in the Rocks"	Nat Perrin	Oscar Brodney	May 10, 1960
Stars Ricardo Montalbán, Lisa Gaye and Karl Swenson.
182	32	"Cap'n Pegleg"	Bud Townsend	Ruth Woodman	May 12, 1960
183	33	"Emma is Coming"	John Rawlins	Virgil C. Gerlach & Jacqueline Rhodes	May 24, 1960
Stars Erin O'Brien and Alan Reed.
184	34	"Human Sacrifice"	Murray Golden	Dorothy Schuyler & Ruth Woodman	June 2, 1960
Stars Arlene Martel and Christopher Dark.
185	35	"Pete Kitchen's Wedding Night"	Bud Townsend	Virgil C. Gerlach	June 7, 1960
Stars Cameron Mitchell and BarBara Luna.
186	36	"Mission to the Mountains"	Bud Townsend	Irwin Winehouse & A. Sanford Wolf	June 9, 1960
Stars John Hoyt, Wayne Rogers and Harry Lauter.
187	37	"The Great Lounsberry Scoop"	Nat Perrin	Ruth Woodman	June 24, 1960
The story of how the news of the Battle of the Little Bighorn broke to an unbelieving nation, courtesy of Colonel Clement Lounsberry of The Bismarck Tribune. Stars Ron Hayes and Walter Sande.
188	38	"Somewhere in the Vultures"	Alan Crosland Jr.	Budd Lesser	October 15, 1959
Stars Paul Richards, Kathleen Crowley and Frank Ferguson.

=== Season 9 (1960–61) ===
No. overall	No. in season	Title	Directed by	Written by	Original release date
189	1	"Pamela's Oxen"	Harry Harris	Frank Bonham	September 24, 1960
Stars Ida Lupino and James Coburn.
190	2	"Splinter Station"	Jesse Hibbs	Mildred Cram	September 25, 1960
Stars Jane Russell.
191	3	"Queen of the High Graders"	Jesse Hibbs	Don Moore & Arthur Rowe	October 2, 1960
Stars Virginia Christine, Lane Bradford and Will Wright.
192	4	"Devil's Bar"	Richard Whorf	Lillian Rose & Jay Rosenburg	October 3, 1960
Stars Ron Hayes.
193	5	"Learnin' at Dirty Devil"	Richard Whorf	Robert L. Joseph	October 24, 1960
194	6	"The Yankee Confederate"	Boris Sagal	Lillian Rose & Jay Rosenburg	October 24, 1960
Stars Tod Andrews, Elaine Devry and Gavin MacLeod.
195	7	"The Gentle Sword"	Jesse Hibbs	Virgil C. Gerlach	November 7, 1960
Stars Lorna Thayer.
196	8	"Extra Guns"	David Orrick McDearmon	John Alexander	November 20, 1960
Stars Guy Madison.
197	9	"The White Healer"	Bud Townsend	Robert L. Joseph	November 21, 1960
Stars Lee Philips.
198	10	"The Wind at Your Back"	James Sheldon	Ande Lamb	December 5, 1960
Stars June Dayton and Steven Terrell.
199	11	"3-7-77"	James Sheldon	Robert L. Joseph	December 14, 1960
Stars Joel Crothers.
200	12	"A Girl Named Virginia"	Jesse Hibbs	Karl Brown	December 18, 1960
Stars Patty McCormack and John Anderson.
201	13	"City of Widows"	Jesse Hibbs	Virginia M. Cooke	December 19, 1960
202	14	"The Young Gun"	James Sheldon	Karl Brown	December 27, 1960
Stars Arthur Franz and King Calder.
203	15	"The Lady Was an M.D."	Jesse Hibbs	Kenneth A. Enochs	January 1, 1961
Stars Yvonne de Carlo.
204	16	"The Salt War"	Jesse Hibbs	A. Sanford Wolf & Irwin Winehouse	January 15, 1961
Stars Harry Lauter and Norman Leavitt.
205	17	"The Madstone"	Gene Reynolds	Lillian Rose	January 18, 1961
Stars George Macready.
206	18	"Deadline at Austin"	James Sheldon	Ray Buffum	January 29, 1961
Stars David Janssen.
207	19	"South of Horror Flats"	Budd Boetticher	John K. McCarthy & Jay Rosenburg	January 31, 1961
208	20	"Gamble with Death"	James Sheldon	Dorothy Schuyler & Ruth Woodman	February 10, 1961
Stars Dick Sargent.
209	21	"White Gold"	Jesse Hibbs	Robert L. Joseph	February 15, 1961
210	22	"Dead Man's Tale"	Tommy Thompson	Robert Presnell Jr.	February 26, 1961
Stars Peter Hansen, John Milford and Russell Johnson.
211	23	"Who's Fer Divide?"	William Dario Faralla	Robert L. Joseph	March 1, 1961
Stars Peter Whitney, Dabbs Greer, George D. Wallace and Frank Wilcox.
212	24	"Dangerous Crossing"	Bud Townsend	Ryerson Johnson & Budd Lesser	March 12, 1961
213	25	"Death Ride"	Roger Kay	Ernest Pascal	March 15, 1961
Stars Marion Ross.
214	26	"Loophole"	Jesse Hibbs	Paul Franklin & Glenhall Taylor	March 25, 1961
Stars Alexander Davion, Arthur Shields and Tom Monroe.
215	27	"The Red Petticoat"	Bud Townsend	Lawrence Menkin & Allen Parr	March 29, 1961
Stars H.M. Wynant and Hal Needham.
216	28	"The Stolen City"	Robert B. Sinclair	Robert L. Joseph	April 9, 1961
Stars Darren McGavin.
217	29	"A General Without Cause"	Bud Townsend	Budd Lesser & Robert S. Samuels	April 12, 1961
Stars Jack Elam and Lisa Gaye.
218	30	"The Deserters"	Robert B. Sinclair	Lillian Rose & Jay Rosenburg	November 6, 1960
Stars Kenneth Tobey.

=== Season 10 (1961–62) ===
No. overall	No. in season	Title	Directed by	Written by	Original release date
219	1	"Treasure of Elk Creek Canyon"	Tommy Thompson	John K. McCarthy	TBA
Stars Alan Hale Jr., John Considine and George Eldredge.
220	2	"A Bullet for the D.A."	Harold Daniels	Ruth Woodman	TBA
Stars Carole Mathews and William Thourlby.
221	3	"Lieutenant Bungle"	Jesse Hibbs	Lillian Rose & Jay Rosenburg	TBA
Stars Rance Howard.
222	4	"Trial by Fear"	William Dario Faralla	Donald H. Clark	TBA
223	5	"Queen of Spades"	Darren McGavin	Robert Sabaroff	TBA
Stars L.Q. Jones and Doodles Weaver.
224	6	"Alias James Stuart"	James Goldstone	Jack Bennett	TBA
Stars Robert Culp.
225	7	"Storm Over Truckee"	Bud Townsend	Peggy Witt	TBA
Stars Jena Engstrom.
226	8	"The Hold-Up Proof Safe"	Larry Lansburgh	Lillian Rose	TBA
Stars John Ashley.
227	9	"The Watch"	Tay Garnett	Jay Rosenburg	TBA
Stars Dorothy Malone.
228	10	"Miracle at Boot Hill"	Bud Townsend	Budd Lesser & Ruth Woodman	TBA
Stars John Carradine, Peter Hansen, Howard Caine and Penny Edwards.
229	11	"A Sponge Full of Vinegar"	George Cahan	John K. McCarthy & Ruth Woodman	TBA
Stars Lloyd Corrigan, Paul Birch and Anne Barton.
230	12	"The Truth Teller"	Bud Townsend	Robert L. Joseph	TBA
Stars Ed Kemmer and Barney Phillips.
231	13	"Experiment in Fear"	Nat Perrin	Jack Lewis	TBA
Stars Michael Pate.
232	14	"Feud at Dome Rock"	Bud Townsend	Jack Lewis	TBA
Stars John Pickard and Hope Summers.
233	15	"Justice at Jackson Creek"	George Cahan	Sue Canter & Ruth Woodman	TBA
Stars Arthur Franz, William Schallert and Bill Bixby.
234	16	"Preacher with a Past"	Bud Townsend	Charles A. Wallace	TBA
Stars Neville Brand.
235	17	"Abel Duncan's Dying Wish"	Nat Perrin	Oliver Crawford	TBA
Stars Eduard Franz and Walter Sande.
236	18	"Way Station"	George Cahan	Lillian Rose	TBA
Stars Dennis Day, William Phipps and Frank Wilcox.
237	19	"Miracle at Whiskey Gulch"	Lawrence Dobkin	John Alexander & Terence Maples	TBA
Stars Fess Parker and George Kennedy.
238	20	"A Matter of Honor"	James Goldstone	Lillian Rose	TBA
Stars Vic Morrow.
239	21	"The Breaking Point"	Sidney Salkow	William Powell & Ruth Woodman	TBA
Stars DeForest Kelley and Grace Lee Whitney.
240	22	"Girl with a Gun"	James Goldstone	Budd Lesser	TBA
Stars Anne Helm.
241	23	"Showdown at Kamaaina Flats"	Sidney Salkow	Jack Lewis	TBA
Stars John Vivyan, Lane Bradford, Gregg Palmer and Terence de Marney.
242	24	"La Tules"	Tay Garnett	Jacqueline Rhodes & Ruth Woodman	TBA
Stars Katy Jurado, Rodolfo Acosta and Rodolfo Hoyos Jr.
243	25	"The Unshakeable Man"	Tay Garnett	William Read Woodfield	TBA
Stars Tony Martin.
244	26	"The Third Passenger"	Jesse Hibbs	Ruth Woodman	TBA

=== Season 11 (1962–63) ===
Season 11 has 3 episodes produced in color, episodes 7, 8 and 9.

No. overall	No. in season	Title	Directed by	Written by	Original release date
245	1	"Hangtown Fry"	Bud Townsend	John K. Butler & Homer McCoy	TBA
Stars Alberta Nelson, Robert Cornthwaite, Don Haggerty and Helen Kleeb.
246	2	"Fort Bowie: Urgent"	Frank McDonald	John K. Butler & Homer McCoy	TBA
Stars Ed Nelson and Dub Taylor.
247	3	"Suzie"	Bud Townsend	Virgil C. Gerlach & Terence Maples	TBA
Stars Jeffrey Hunter and Frank Ferguson.
248	4	"Pioneer Doctor"	Sidney Salkow	F. Paul Hall	TBA
Stars John Agar.
249	5	"The $275,000 Sack of Flour"	Sidney Salkow	Barry Shipman	TBA
Stars James Best, Booth Colman and William Schallert.
250	6	"The Last Shot"	Nat Perrin	Lillian Rose & Frederick Stephani	TBA
Stars Grace Lee Whitney and Johnny Seven.
251	7	"To Walk with Greatness"	Sidney Salkow	John Alexander	TBA
Stars Jody McCrea and Yvonne Craig.
252	8	"The Grass Man"	Tay Garnett	F. Paul Hall & Stephen Lord	TBA
Stars Keenan Wynn and Iron Eyes Cody.
253	9	"Davy's Friend"	Tay Garnett	Virgil C. Gerlach	TBA
Stars Tommy Rettig.
254	10	"Loss of Faith"	Randell Henderson	Barry Shipman	TBA
Stars Rhonda Fleming.
255	11	"Bloodline"	Sidney Salkow	Jay Rosenburg	TBA
Stars Paul Richards and Abraham Sofaer.
256	12	"The Private Mint of Clark, Gruber and Company"	Tay Garnett	Richard Sanville	TBA
257	13	"The Hat That Wore the West"	Sidney Salkow	Irwin Winehouse & A. Sanford Wolf	TBA
Stars Alan Young as John B. Stetson. with Don Haggerty, Ann Robinson and Lee Van Cleef.
258	14	"The Vintage Years"	Sidney Salkow	Tom Gries, Stephen Lord & Gary Munn	TBA
Stars Ralph Bellamy and Merry Anders.
259	15	"Phantom Procession"	Jesse Hibbs	Barry Shipman	TBA
Stars Miriam Colon.
260	16	"A Gun is Not a Gentleman"	Tay Garnett	Robert Hardy Andrews	TBA
Stars Carroll O'Connor, Phyllis Coates, Malachi Throne and Emory Parnell.
261	17	"Stubborn Mule Hill"	Sidney Salkow	John K. Butler & Homer McCoy	TBA
Stars David McLean and Russell Johnson.
262	18	"The Lion of Idaho"	Bernard McEveety	Jay Rosenburg & Barry Shipman	TBA
Stars Steve Forrest and Audrey Dalton.
263	19	"The Train and Lucy Tutaine"	Tay Garnett	Richard Ashby & Stephen Lord	TBA
Stars Joan Blondell and Noah Beery Jr.
264	20	"Diamond Jim Brady"	Bernard McEveety	Seton I. Miller	TBA
Stars Howard Keel and King Calder.
265	21	"Grotto of Death"	Dick Moder	Stephen Lord	TBA
Stars Elisha Cook Jr.
266	22	"The Debt"	Tay Garnett	Sid Saltzman	TBA
Stars Alejandro Rey and Alan Caillou.
267	23	"Shadow of Violence"	Dick Moder	Robert Hardy Andrews	TBA
Stars James Caan, Roy Thinnes and Hugh Sanders.
268	24	"Coffin for a Coward"	Dick Moder	Stephen Lord	TBA
Stars DeForest Kelley.
269	25	"The Melancholy Gun"	Dick Moder	Stephen Lord	TBA
Stars Ken Scott and Elizabeth MacRae.
270	26	"With Honesty and Integrity"	Bud Townsend	John Alexander	TBA
Stars Denver Pyle and Sandy Kenyon.

=== Season 12 (1963–64) ===
Season 12 has 10 episodes produced in color, episodes 1, 2, 3, 8, 9, 11, 12, 13, 15 and 20.

No. overall	No. in season	Title	Directed by	Written by	Original release date
271	1	"Thar She Blows"	Tay Garnett	Stephen Lord	TBA
Stars George Gobel.
272	2	"Measure of a Man"	Tay Garnettsteps to asd	Sloan Nibley	TBA
Stars Rory Calhoun and Michael Pate.
273	3	"A Kingdom for a Horse"	Tay Garnett	Zetta Castle & Francis Rosenwald	TBA
Stars Gilbert Roland and Patricia Huston.
274	4	"Diamond Field Jack"	Murray Golden	Harold E. Noble	TBA
Stars Edward Binns and Joseph Ruskin.
275	5	"Deadly Decision"	Sidney Salkow	A. Sanford Wolf	TBA
Stars James Caan and R.G. Armstrong.
276	6	"The Man Who Died Twice"	Orville H. Hampton	Orville H. Hampton	TBA
Stars Don Collier.
277	7	"The Holy Terror"	Nat Perrin	Ruth Woodman	TBA
Stars Penny Singleton. This is the final episode written by show creator Ruth Woodman.
278	8	"The Peacemaker"	Nat Perrin	Berni Gould	TBA
279	9	"Three Minutes to Eternity"	Harmon Jones	Stephen Lord	TBA
Stars Forrest Tucker and Tom Skerritt.
280	10	"The Red Ghost of Eagle Creek"	Tay Garnett	Paul Crabtree	TBA
Stars Hampton Fancher and Paul Birch.
281	11	"Graydon's Charge"	Tay Garnett	Stephen Lord & John Alexander	TBA
Stars Ken Curtis, Denver Pyle and Lyle Bettger.
282	12	"Little Cayuse"	Tay Garnett	Lillian Rose	TBA
Stars Ken Murray and George Keymas.
283	13	"The Wooing of Perilous Pauline"	Tay Garnett	Lillian Rose	TBA
Stars Paula Raymond.
284	14	"Sixty-Seven Miles of Gold"	Tay Garnett	Joanna Lee	TBA
Stars Jack Albertson and James Best.
285	15	"The Paper Dynasty"	Christian Nyby	P.K. Palmer	TBA
Stars James Hampton as William Randolph Hearst. With Robert Cornthwaite and James Lanphier.
286	16	"The Westside of Heaven"	TBA	Stephen Lord	TBA
287	17	"Hastings Cut-Off"	Nat Perrin	Stephen Lord	TBA
Stars Ellen Burstyn, Bill Erwin and Robert Ellenstein.
288	18	"The Law of the Round Tent"	Harmon Jones	Robert S. Samuels	TBA
Stars John Anderson, Dub Taylor and Walter Burke.
289	19	"The Bigger They Are"	Harmon Jones	Frederick Louis Fox	TBA
Stars Dewey Martin, Gloria Talbott, James Seay and Strother Martin.
290	20	"The Last Stagecoach Robbery"	Harmon Jones	Stephen Lord	TBA
Stars Anne Francis.
291	21	"A Book of Spanish Grammar"	Harmon Jones	Sid Saltzman	TBA
Stars David McLean and Rodolfo Acosta.
292	22	"Trial at Belle's Springs"	TBA	Stephen Lord & Jay Rosenburg	TBA
Stars Ken Scott as Virgil Earp. With Lynn Bari and Jennifer Billingsley.
293	23	"After the O.K. Corral"	TBA	Sloan Nibley	TBA
Stars Jim Davis as Wyatt Earp, John Clarke as Virgil Earp and Jeff Morris as Morgan Earp. With William Tannen (who had previously starred, in another role, in The Life and Legend of Wyatt Earp).
294	24	"The Quiet and the Fury"	TBA	Stephen Lord	TBA
Stars Skip Homeier as Doc Holliday. With George Lindsey, Grace Lee Whitney, Dal McKennon and Paul Fix.
295	25	"See the Elephant and Hear the Owl"	TBA	Robert Hardy Andrews	TBA
Stars Steve Forrest.
296	26	"The Streets of El Paso"	Dick McDonough	Phyllis White	TBA
Stars Marshall Thompson and Patricia Huston. This is the final episode to be hosted by "The Old Ranger" (Stanley Andrews).

=== Season 13 (1964–65) ===
All episodes in color.

No. overall	No. in season	Title	Directed by	Written by	Original release date
297	1	"Honor the Name Dennis Driscoll"	Harmon Jones	Kenneth Higgins	TBA
Stars Tom Skerritt, Don Haggerty and John Pickard. This is the first episode to be hosted by Ronald Reagan.
298	2	"The Lucky Cow"	Murray Golden	Crandall Brown	TBA
Stars Steve Brodie and Phyllis Coates.
299	3	"Big John and the Rainmaker"	Harmon Jones	Herman Miller	TBA
300	4	"From the Earth, a Heritage"	Harmon Jones	Stephen Lord	TBA
Stars Peter Whitney and John Alderson.
301	5	"The Other White Man"	Murray Golden	Melvin Levy	TBA
Stars James Edwards.
302	6	"The Hero of Fort Halleck"	Tay Garnett	Walt Anderson	TBA
Stars James Best.
303	7	"The Left Hand is Damned"	Harmon Jones	Hendrik Vollaerts	TBA
Stars Phyllis Coates.
304	8	"There Was Another Dalton Brother"	Dick McDonough	Phyllis White & Robert White	TBA
Stars Strother Martin and Robert Easton.
305	9	"Tribute to the Dog"	Harmon Jones	Lance Hazzard	TBA
Stars Ronald Reagan. Starting with this episode, it would become an occurrence for the host to also star in an episode.
306	10	"The $25,000 Wager"	Harmon Jones	Jerry D. Lewis	TBA
Stars Diane Brewster and Hedley Mattingly.
307	11	"A Bargain is for Keeping"	Harmon Jones	Stephen Lord & Lynn McMillen	TBA
Stars Robert Colbert, Sue Randall and Karl Swenson.
308	12	"Peter the Hunter"	Lee Sholem	Herman Miller	TBA
Stars Peter Whitney and Julie Sommars.
309	13	"Paid in Full"	Lee Sholem	Jerry D. Lewis	TBA
Stars Michael Constantine.
310	14	"A Bell for Volcano"	Lee Sholem	Robert White & Phyllis White	TBA
Stars Jay Novello.
311	15	"The Trouble with Taxes"	Lee Sholem	John Starr Niendorff	TBA
Stars Royal Dano.
312	16	"The Race at Cherry Creek"	Harmon Jones	Del Carnes	TBA
313	17	"Death in the Desert"	Tay Garnett	Herman Miller	TBA
Stars David McLean.
314	18	"Raid on the San Francisco Mint"	Fred Jackman Jr.	Jerry D. Lewis	TBA
Stars Ronald Reagan, Judson Pratt and Vaughn Taylor.
315	19	"Magic Locket"	Tay Garnett	Joanna Lee	TBA
Stars June Lockhart, Sean McClory, Kathy Garver and Irene Tedrow, Dennis Robertson, June Lockhart, Jr., Anne Lockhart.
316	20	"The Battle of San Francisco Bay"	Jack Shea	Robert Hardy Andrews (based on an article by Jerry MacMullen)	TBA
Stars Ronald Reagan.
317	21	"The Wild West's Biggest Train Holdup"	Harmon Jones	Robert Hardy Andrews	TBA
Stars Charles Bateman, Pat Priest and Roy Barcroft.
318	22	"No Gun Behind His Badge"	Lee Sholem	Robert Hardy Andrews	TBA
Stars Ronald Reagan.
319	23	"Fighting Sky Pilot"	Lee Sholem	Robert Leslie Bellem & Todhunter Ballard	TBA
Stars Skip Homeier and Carol Brewster.
320	24	"The Journey"	Jack Shea	Sid Saltzman	TBA
Stars Wayne Rogers, Robert J. Wilke and Leonard Nimoy.
321	25	"Kate Melville and the Law"	Harmon Jones	Harold E. Noble	TBA
Stars Gloria Talbott and Richard Anderson.
322	26	"Birthright"	Lee Sholem	Stephen Lord	TBA
Stars R.G. Armstrong.

=== Season 14 (1965–66) ===
No. overall	No. in season	Title	Directed by	Written by	Original release date
323	1	"Temporary Warden"	Harmon Jones	Robert Leslie Bellem & Todhunter Ballard	TBA
Stars Ronald Reagan and George Murdock.
324	2	"Captain Dick Mine"	Hal Cooper	Frank Gruber & Louis A. Garfinkle	TBA
Stars Lisa Gaye.
325	3	"The Lawless Have Laws"	Tay Garnett	Robert Hardy Andrews	TBA
Stars Ronald Reagan, Abraham Sofaer and Tim McIntire.
326	4	"The Great Turkey War"	Hal Cooper	Robert Hardy Andrews	TBA
Stars Michael Constantine and Don Haggerty.
327	5	"The Rider"	TBA	Kenneth Higgins	TBA
328	6	"Traveling Trees"	Tay Garnett	Sid Saltzman	TBA
Stars Royal Dano and Tim McIntire.
329	7	"No Place for a Lady"	Tay Garnett	Dorothy Schuyler	TBA
Stars Linda Marsh as Susan Magoffin, the first woman to travel the Santa Fe trail. With Ronald Reagan.
330	8	"A City is Born"	Harmon Jones	Robert Leslie Bellem & Todhunter Ballard	TBA
Stars Ronald Reagan and James Seay.
331	9	"The Book"	Harmon Jones	Shel Lytton	TBA
Stars Tom Skerritt, George Takei and Tris Coffin.
332	10	"Mrs. Romney and the Outlaws"	Hal Cooper	Del Carnes	TBA
Stars Rosemary DeCamp and Willard Sage.
333	11	"Dry Water Sailors"	Harmon Jones	Robert Leslie Bellem & Todhunter Ballard	TBA
Stars Walter Brooke and Ann Elder.
334	12	"Devil's Gate"	Hal Cooper	Harold E. Noble	TBA
Stars Jim Davis as the wagon master Ezra Meeker. With Patricia Smith and DeForest Kelley.
335	13	"The Red Shawl"	Harmon Jones	Claire Whitaker	TBA
Stars Mariette Hartley and Ken Scott.
336	14	"A Picture of a Lady"	Harmon Jones	Glenhall Taylor	TBA
Stars Peter Whitney, Francine York and Paul Fix.
337	15	"Canary Harris vs. the Almighty"	Hal Cooper	Claire Whitaker	TBA
Stars Rosemary DeCamp, Peggy Rea and Robert Cornthwaite.
338	16	"The Fastest Nun in the West"	Harmon Jones	Jerry D. Lewis	TBA
Stars Julie Sommars, Don Haggerty, Michael Constantine, Willard Sage and John Clarke.
339	17	"The Fight San Francisco Never Forgot"	Bud Townsend	Robert Hardy Andrews & Jerry D. Lewis	TBA
340	18	"The Courtship of Carrie Huntington"	Harmon Jones	Harold E. Noble	TBA
Stars Sue Randall.
341	19	"The Water Bringer"	Hal Cooper	Robert Hardy Andrews & Idwal Jones	TBA
Stars Rory Calhoun.
342	20	"Crullers at Sundown!"	Harmon Jones	Louis A. Garfinkle	TBA
Stars Peter Whitney and Ann Elder.
343	21	"Hugh Glass Meets the Bear"	Harmon Jones	Dorothy Schuyler	TBA
Stars John Alderson and Morgan Woodward.
344	22	"The Firebrand"	Bob Quinlan	Dennis Whitcomb	TBA
345	23	"The Hat That Huldah Wore"	Jack Shea	Stephen Lord & Louise Cheney	TBA
Stars Anna-Lisa.
346	24	"The Four Dollar Law Suit"	Hal Cooper	Kenneth Higgins	TBA
Stars Strother Martin, J. Pat O'Malley and Pamelyn Ferdin.
347	25	"An Organ for Brother Brigham"	Harmon Jones	Claire Whitaker	TBA
Stars Hedley Mattingly and John Alderson.
348	26	"Lady of the Plains"	Tay Garnett	Stephen Lord	TBA
Stars DeForest Kelley and Sherry Jackson. This is the final episode to be hosted by Ronald Reagan.

=== Season 15 (1966–67) ===
No. overall	No. in season	Title	Directed by	Written by	Original release date
349	1	"The Day All Marriages Were Cancelled"	Hal Cooper	Kenneth Higgins	TBA
Stars Robert Taylor and Oscar Beregi Jr. This is the first episode to be hosted by Taylor.
350	2	"The Solid Gold Cavity"	Jack Shea	Stewart Cohn	TBA
Stars Howard Caine and Paul Brinegar.
351	3	"The Resurrection of Deadwood Dick"	Tay Garnett	Sloan Nibley	TBA
Stars Tol Avery.
352	4	"Brute Angel"	Denver Pyle	Scott Whitaker	TBA
Stars Robert J. Wilke and Jim Davis.
353	5	"Sense of Justice"	Harmon Jones	Gil Lasky	TBA
Stars Tom Skerritt and Tris Coffin.
354	6	"The Lady and the Sourdough"	Harmon Jones	Stephen Lord & William Kelley	TBA
Stars Paul Brinegar and Amzie Strickland.
355	7	"The Kid from Hell's Kitchen"	Harmon Jones	Sidney Ellis	TBA
Stars Robert Blake as Billy the Kid. With John Alderson, Lane Bradford and James Seay.
356	8	"Samaritans, Mountain Style"	Jean Yarbrough	Herbert Purdom	TBA
357	9	"One Fast Injun"	Hal Cooper	Jerry Patch	TBA
Stars Walter Burke, Dub Taylor and Vance Colvig Jr.
358	10	"The Jolly Roger and Wells Fargo"	Denver Pyle	Virgil C. Gerlach	TBA
Stars Lloyd Bochner.
359	11	"The Hero of Apache Pass"	Jean Yarbrough	Del Carnes	TBA
Stars Charles Bateman and Michael Pate.
360	12	"The Gypsy"	Tay Garnett	Dennis Whitcomb	TBA
Stars Lisa Gaye.
361	13	"A Calamity Called Jane"	Jack Shea	Stephen Lord	TBA
Stars Fay Spain as Calamity Jane. With Rhodes Reason as Wild Bill Hickok.
362	14	"Doc Holiday's Gold Bars"	Hal Cooper	Lowell Barrington	TBA
Stars Warren Stevens as Doc Holliday. With Tol Avery and William Christopher.
363	15	"Silver Tombstone"	Denver Pyle	Stephen Lord	TBA
Stars Strother Martin and Jamie Farr.
364	16	"The Man Who Didn't Want Gold"	Ralph Levy	Gene Lesser	TBA
Stars Hal Smith.
365	17	"Halo for a Badman"	Denver Pyle	Harold E. Noble	TBA
Stars Robert Taylor and Marion Ross.
366	18	"A Wrangler's Last Ride"	Jack Shea	Virgil C. Gerlach	TBA
Stars Robert Taylor.
367	19	"The Man Who Wouldn't Die"	Ralph Levy	Scott Whitaker	TBA
Stars Jan Clayton.
368	20	"The Saga of Dr. Davis"	Harmon Jones	Sandy Spillman & Shirley Spillman	TBA
Stars Joby Baker.
369	21	"Major Horace Bell"	Denver Pyle	Sloan Nibley	TBA
Stars Robert Taylor, Susan Hart and Robert Cornthwaite.
370	22	"The Day They Stole the Salamander"	Hal Cooper	Lillian Rose	TBA
Stars Jim Davis and Patricia Huston.
371	23	"Siege at Amelia's Kitchen"	Denver Pyle	Claire Whitaker	TBA
Stars Jean Willes.
372	24	"Solid Foundation"	Jean Yarbrough	Paul Franklin	TBA
Stars Susan Seaforth Hayes and Gil Peterson.
373	25	"Along Came Mariana"	Jack Shea	Jerry D. Lewis	TBA
Stars Julie Parrish.
374	26	"A Man Called Abraham"	Denver Pyle	Del Rayburn & Louise Rayburn	TBA
Stars Yaphet Kotto.

=== Season 16 (1967–68) ===
No. overall	No. in season	Title	Directed by	Written by	Original release date
375	1	"Shanghai Kelly's Birthday Party"	Jean Yarbrough	Dennis Whitcomb	TBA
Stars Robert Taylor and Robert Pine.
376	2	"Chicken Bill"	Jack Hively	William Davis Jr.	TBA
Stars Dub Taylor.
377	3	"Let My People Go"	Denver Pyle	Dennis Whitcomb	TBA
Stars Jay Novello and Valentin de Vargas.
378	4	"The Lone Grave"	Harmon Jones	Claire Whitaker	TBA
Stars Robert Taylor and James Seay.
379	5	"The Girl Who Walked the West"	Jean Yarbrough	Ann Udell	TBA
Stars Victoria Vetri as Sacajawea. With Don Matheson & Richard Simmons (actor) as Lewis & Clark, and Victor French.
380	6	"The Informer Who Cried"	Jean Yarbrough	Scott Whitaker	TBA
381	7	"Spring Rendezvous"	Harmon Jones	William Davis Jr.	TBA
Stars James MacArthur as Kit Carson. With Brioni Farrell.
382	8	"Lost Sheep in Trinidad"	Harmon Jones	Robert Hardy Andrews	TBA
Stars Mariette Hartley.
383	9	"The Saga of Sadie Orchard"	Jack Shea	Robert Hardy Andrews	TBA
Stars Patricia Huston and Tris Coffin.
384	10	"The Indiana Girl"	Denver Pyle	Jerry Patch	TBA
Stars Sid Haig.
385	11	"Prince of the Oyster Pirates"	Harmon Jones	Dennis Whitcomb	TBA
Stars Len Lesser.
386	12	"The Friend"	Hal Cooper	Shel Lytton	TBA
Stars Robert Taylor, Jeff Morris and Rudy Vallée.
387	13	"The Great Diamond Mines"	Denver Pyle	William Davis Jr.	TBA
Stars John Fiedler and Gavin MacLeod.
388	14	"Count Me In, Count Me Out"	Jean Yarbrough	Rick McClun	TBA
Stars Jay Novello.
389	15	"Dress for a Desert Girl"	Hal Cooper	Ann Udell	TBA
Stars Mariette Hartley and Richard Beymer.
390	16	"Britta Goes Home"	Jack Shea	Claire Whitaker	TBA
Stars Susanne Cramer.
391	17	"Bread on the Desert"	Jack Shea	Robert Hardy Andrews	TBA
Stars Paul Winfield and Sam Melville.
392	18	"Green is the Color of Gold"	Jack Hively	Stephen Lord	TBA
Stars Royal Dano, Lisa Gaye and Chubby Johnson.
393	19	"Out of the Valley of Death"	Herbert Kenwith	Robert Hardy Andrews	TBA
Stars Jim Davis, Bing Russell and Harry Lauter.
394	20	"The Gold Mine on Main Street"	Jack Shea	Kenneth Higgins	TBA
Stars John Astin.
395	21	"A Friend Indeed"	Jean Yarbrough	Ann Udell	TBA
Stars Jim Davis, Bing Russell, Harry Lauter, reprising their roles from Out of the Valley of Death. With Foster Brooks.
396	22	"The Thirty-Caliber Town"	Stephen Lord	Stephen Lord	TBA
Stars John Ericson and Aron Kincaid.
397	23	"The Other Side of the Mountain"	Jack Hively	Dennis Whitcomb	TBA
398	24	"By the Book"	Jean Yarbrough	William Davis Jr. & Eileen Hunt	TBA
399	25	"The Pieces of the Puzzle"	Jean Yarbrough	Glenhall Taylor	TBA
Stars Robert Taylor and Russell Johnson.
400	26	"Tall Heart, Short Temper"	Stephen Lord	Stephen Lord	TBA
Stars Arch Johnson and Grace Lee Whitney.

=== Season 17 (1968–69) ===
No. overall	No. in season	Title	Directed by	Written by	Original release date
401	1	"The Secret of the Black Prince"	Jack Shea	Glenhall Taylor	TBA
Stars J. Pat O'Malley and James Seay.
402	2	"The Leprechaun of Last Chance Gulch"	Stephen Lord	Robert Hardy Andrews	TBA
Stars Walter Burke.
403	3	"Ton of Tin"	Stephen Lord	Stephen Lord	TBA
Stars David McLean and Aron Kincaid.
404	4	"The Sage Hen"	Jack Hively	Herbert Purdom	TBA
405	5	"The Other Cheek"	Harry Landers	Scott Whitaker	TBA
406	6	"A Mule... Like the Army's Mule"	Jack Hively	Gene Lesser	TBA
Stars Sam Melville.
407	7	"Lottie's Legacy"	Jack Hively	William Kozlenko	TBA
Sgtars Lisa Gaye.
408	8	"Lady with a Past"	Harmon Jones	Ann Udell	TBA
Stars Robert Taylor and Mariette Hartley.
409	9	"A Short Cut Through Tombstone"	Jack Hively	Harold E. Noble	TBA
Stars Robert Taylor and Brioni Farrell.
410	10	"Up the Chimney"	TBA	TBA	TBA
Stars Jim Davis.
411	11	"The World's Greatest Swimming Horse"	Harmon Jones	Kenneth A. Enochs	TBA
Stars J. Pat O'Malley.
412	12	"Ten Day Millionaires"	Jack Hively	Herbert Purdom	TBA
Stars Tom Skerritt and Chubby Johnson.
413	13	"A Restless Man"	Harmon Jones	Phyllis White & Robert White	TBA
Stars William Smith.
414	14	"A Gift"	Jack Hively	Berta Peters	TBA
Stars Jeanne Cooper.
415	15	"Solomon's Glory"	Harmon Jones	William Davis Jr.	TBA
Stars John Beck.
416	16	"The Understanding"	Jack Hively	Lance Hazzard	TBA
Stars Valentin de Vargas, Rodolfo Hoyos Jr. and William Smith.
417	17	"Long Night at Fort Lonely"	Jack Hively	Claire Whitaker	TBA
Stars June Dayton. Robert Taylor appears in an uncredited role.
418	18	"Here Stands Bailey"	William Hogan	Herbert Purdom	TBA
Stars Paul Fix and Rosemary DeCamp.
419	19	"The Angel of Tombstone"	Jack Hively	Charles Davis, Doug Wilson & Louise Cheney	TBA
Stars Gregg Barton, Tris Coffin and Grace Lee Whitney.
420	20	"A Full House"	Harmon Jones	Dennis Whitcomb	TBA
421	21	"How to Beat a Badman"	Jack Hively	William Davis Jr.	TBA
422	22	"A Key for the Fort"	Harmon Jones	William Davis Jr.	TBA
Stars Lane Bradbury.
423	23	"Drop Out"	Stephen Lord	Stephen Lord	TBA
Stars Michael Margotta as Butch Cassidy.
424	24	"The Oldest Law"	Jack Hively	John Starr Niendorff	TBA
Stars Jim Davis.
425	25	"Lucia Darling and the Ostrich"	Jack Shea	Harold E. Noble	TBA
Stars Tol Avery.
426	26	"Jimmy Dayton's Bonanza"	Jack Shea	Charles Davis & Doug Wilson	TBA
Stars Paul Brinegar. This is the final episode to be hosted by Robert Taylor.

=== Season 18 (1969–70) ===
No. overall	No. in season	Title	Directed by	Written by	Original release date
427	1	"The Taming of Trudy Bell"	Jack Hively	Unknown	October 2, 1969
Starring Dale Robertson and Buck Taylor. This is the first episode to be hosted by Dale Robertson.
428	2	"Tracy's Triumph"	Jean Yarbrough	Norman Jacob	October 4, 1969
Starring Dale Robertson and Lisa Gaye.
429	3	"Old Stape"	Jack Hively	Herbert Purdom	October 4, 1969
Stars Eddie Firestone and Don Haggerty.
430	4	"The Tenderfoot"	Jean Yarbrough	Bonnie Souleles	October 9, 1969
Stars Dale Robertson, Mitch Vogel and Erin Moran.
431	5	"Biscuits and Billy, the Kid"	Jean Yarbrough	William Canning	October 10, 1969
Stars Ben Cooper and Valentin de Vargas.
432	6	"Son of Thunder"	Stephen Lord	Stephen Lord & Harold Schindler	October 26, 1969
Stars Dale Robertson, Gregg Palmer and Bing Russell.
433	7	"The Lady Doctor"	Stephen Lord	Stephen Lord	October 27, 1969
Stars Maura McGiveney.
434	8	"The Great Pinto Bean Gold Hunt"	Jack Hively	William Davis Jr. & Joan Wade	November 16, 1969
435	9	"The Visitor"	Jack Hively	Lance Hazzard	November 17, 1969
Stars Eddie Little Sky.
436	10	"The King of Uvalde Road"	Stephen Lord	Stephen Lord	January 1, 1970
Stars Hal Baylor and Brenda Benet.
437	11	"The Mezcla Man"	Jack Hively	Herbert Purdom	January 2, 1970
Stars Jesse Pearson and Royal Dano.
438	12	"Pioneer Pluck"	Jean Yarbrough	William Davis Jr. & Ella Duncan	January 3, 1970
Stars Karen Carlson, Roger Ewing and Irene Tedrow.
439	13	"A Simple Question of Justice"	Jean Yarbrough	William Davis Jr. & S.H. McGuire	January 12, 1970
Stars Lane Bradford, Royal Dano and Veronica Cartwright.
440	14	"The Wizard of Aberdeen"	Stephen Lord	Stephen Lord & Vernon H. Jones	January 17, 1970
Stars Conlan Carter as L. Frank Baum. With Jennifer Edwards and Beverlee McKinsey.
441	15	"The Dragon of Gold Hill"	Jean Yarbrough	Ann Udell	January 24, 1970
Stars Mark Jenkins, William Smith, Don Megowan and Soon-Tek Oh.
442	16	"The Biggest Little Post Office in the World"	Jean Yarbrough	Jim De Foe	January 24, 1970
Stars Dale Robertson, Walter Brooke and Tol Avery.
443	17	"A Saint of Travelers"	Jack Hively	Virginia Books	February 14, 1970
Stars Robert Ellenstein and Joaquín Martínez.
444	18	"Talk to Me, Charley"	Jack Hively	Herbert Purdom & Shirley Bibield	February 15, 1970
445	19	"Amos and the Black Bull"	Jack Hively	Barbara Randall & Art Reeves	February 28, 1970
Stars Sean McClory and Susan Brown.
446	20	"The Man Who Planted Gold in California"	Jean Yarbrough	Robert Hardy Andrews	March 16, 1970
Stars Anna-Lisa.
447	21	"The Solid Gold Pie"	Jack Hively	Herbert Purdom	April 1, 1970
Stars June Dayton and Ted Gehring.
448	22	"A Gift from Father Tapis"	Jean Yarbrough	William Canning	April 7, 1970
Stars Ned Romero.
449	23	"Clum's Constabulary"	Lamar Caselli	William Davis Jr., S.H. Barnett & Colin MacKenzie	April 9, 1970
Stars Tris Coffin, John Considine and James Seay.
450	24	"The Contract"	Jack Hively	William Canning	April 18, 1970
451	25	"The Duke of Tombstone"	Jack Hively	William Davis Jr. & Sloan Nibley	April 21, 1970
452	26	"Early Candle Lighten"	Jean Yarbrough	Mary Terri Taylor	April 24, 1970
