= The Zero Hour (American radio series) =

Audiocassettes cover

The Zero Hour (aka Hollywood Radio Theater) was a 1973–74 American radio drama anthology series hosted by Rod Serling. With tales of mystery, adventure and suspense, the program was broadcast for two seasons.

The radio series debuted on September 3, 1973, in syndication, and was picked up by the Mutual Broadcasting System in December. The original format featured five-part dramas broadcast Monday through Friday with the story coming to a conclusion on Friday. Including commercials, each part was approximately 30 minutes long. Mutual affiliates were free to broadcast the series in any available time slot that they wished.

In 1974, still airing five days a week, the program changed to a full story in a single 30-minute installment with the same actor starring throughout the week in all five programs. That format was employed from late April 1974 to the end of the series in July 1974.

Producer J. M. Kholos was a Los Angeles advertising man who acquired the rights to suspense novels, including Tony Hillerman's The Blessing Way, for radio adaptations. In some cases, the titles were changed. For example, the five-part "Desperate Witness" was an adaptation of The Big Clock by Kenneth Fearing. To create a strong package, Kholos followed through by lining up top actors, including John Astin, Edgar Bergen, Joseph Campanella, Richard Crenna, John Dehner, Howard Duff, Keenan Wynn, Richard Deacon, Patty Duke, Nina Foch, George Maharis, Susan Oliver, Brock Peters and Lurene Tuttle.

The opening theme music was by Ferrante & Teicher. Don Hills produced the series for StudioHouse, which also produced the Salvation Army's Heartbeat Theatre. Counting each five-part show as five episodes, there were a total of 130 episodes. Failing to find a large audience due to the initial weekly serial format and lack of promotion, Mutual canceled the program, and the final episode was broadcast on July 26, 1974, though many Mutual affiliates continued broadcasting repeats for several months afterwards. According to director Elliott Lewis, "They wanted as much name value as possible to help with sales. They forgot they had to sell it. Everybody sat in the office and waited for someone to call them up and buy the show."

Highbridge Audio released six of the five-part stories on audiocassettes. "Desperate Witness"; "Face Of The Foe"; "But I Wouldn't Want To Die There"; "Wife Of The Red-Haired Man"; "The Heir Hunters" and "If Two Of Them Are Dead."

== Episodes – Series One ==
No.	Title	Written by / based on novel by	Original release date
1–5	"Wife of the Red Haired Man (parts 1-5)"	Bill S. Ballinger	September 3, 1973 to September 7, 1973
"This week Bill S. Ballinger's best selling novel of the pursuit of a damned couple, starring Patty Duke Astin, John Astin, and Howard Duff."
6–10	"Someone's Death (parts 1-5)"	Charles Larson	September 10, 1973 to September 14, 1973
"This week Charles Larson's inside story of television murder, starring George Kennedy, Joyce Bulifant and Robert Reed."
11–15	"Fourth of Forever (parts 1-5)"	Bill S. Ballinger	September 17, 1973 to September 21, 1973
"This week Bill S. Ballinger's study of a deadly obsession, starring John Dehner and Susan Oliver."
16–20	"Face of the Foe (parts 1-5)"	Patricia Power	September 24, 1973 to September 28, 1973
"This week Patricia Power's eerie saga of a neighborhood besieged, starring Jessica Walter, Joe Campanella and Judy Carne."
21–25	"Blessing Way (parts 1-5)"	Tony Hillerman	October 2, 1973 to October 6, 1973
"This week Tony Hillerman's haunting tour of terror, starring Ed Nelson, Barbara Anderson, and Tige Andrews."
26–30	"Princess Stakes Murder Case (parts 1-5)"	Kin Platt	October 8, 1973 to October 12, 1973
"This week Kin Platt's gymkhana of foul play, starring Howard Duff, Julie Adams and Ray Danton."
31–35	"Queen in Danger (parts 1-5)"	Adam Hall	October 15, 1973 to October 19, 1973
"This week Adam Hall's chess match of continental intrigue, starring Juliet Mills, Robert Brown and Murray Matheson."
36–40	"Desperate Witness (parts 1-5)"	Kenneth Fearing	October 22, 1973 to October 26, 1973
"This week Kenneth Fearing's study of a deadly obsession, starring Richard Crenna, Keenan Wynn, and Julie Adams."
41–45	"If Two of Them Are Dead (parts 1-5)"	Stanton Forbes	October 29, 1973 to November 2, 1973
"This week Stanton Forbes' bizarre retrospective tale of entanglement, starring Earl Holliman, Catherine Burns, and Nina Foch as Sister Love."
46–50	"But I Wouldn't Want to Die There (parts 1-5)"	Stanton Forbes	November 5, 1973 to November 9, 1973
"This week Stanton Forbes' labyrinth of tropical intrigue, starring Nehemiah Persoff, Brock Peters, and Marge Redmond." Also starring Alan Reed.
51–55	"Heir Hunters (parts 1-5)"	Bill S. Ballinger	November 12, 1973 to November 16, 1973
"This week Bill S. Ballinger's sound portrait of an unlikely hero, starring Ken Berry, Joanne Worley, Edgar Bergen."
56–60	"A Die in the Country (parts 1-5)"	Tobias Wells	November 19, 1973 to November 23, 1973
"This week Tobias Wells' neogothic tale of small-town terror, starring Peter Marshall, Susan Strasberg, and Andrew Duggan."
61–65	"The Dead Man's Tale (parts 1-5)"	Merwin Gerard	November 26, 1973 to November 30, 1973
"This week Merwin Gerard's study of a man pursued, starring George Maharis, Craig Stevens and Charles McGraw."

== Episodes – Series Two ==
No.	Title	Written by / based on novel by	Starring	Original release date
66	"Bye-Bye Narco"	Keith Walker	Mel Torme	April 29, 1974
"Today Keith Walker's odd tale of violated sanctuary..."
67	"Terror in the Night"	Glenhall Taylor	Mel Torme	April 30, 1974
"Today Glenhall Taylor's frightening suspense thriller..."
68	"Scream of the Hawk"	Keith Walker	Mel Torme	May 1, 1974
"Today Keith Walker's story of the ultimate revenge..."
69	"Extortionist"	Glenhall Taylor	Mel Torme	May 2, 1974
"Today Glenhall Taylor's tale of a threatened death..."
70	"Price of Admission"	Kim Weiskopf	Mel Torme	May 3, 1974
"Today Kim Weiskopf's audio glimpse of the mayhem on the midway..."
71	"Shortage Story"	Kim Weiskopf	Jackie Cooper	May 6, 1974
"Today Kim Weiskopf's twisted tale of modern times..."
72	"Escape to Nowhere"	Glenhall Taylor	Jackie Cooper	May 7, 1974
"Today Glenhall Taylor's tale of murder and futile escape..."
73	"Fair's Fair, You Know"	Keith Walker	Jackie Cooper	May 8, 1974
"Today Keith Walker's convoluted tale of now you see it now you don't..."
74	"Housecall"	Kim Weiskopf	Jackie Cooper	May 9, 1974
"Today Kim Weiskopf's unravelling of a grisly prescription..."
75	"Violation"	Keith Walker	Jackie Cooper	May 10, 1974
"Today Keith Walker's frightened story of blinded justice..." Featured in the cast: John Larch
76	"Arm's Length"	Kim Weiskopf	Dick Sargent	May 13, 1974
"Today Kim Weiskopf's grisly tale of detachment..." Featured in the cast: Ross Martin
77	"Some People Die Only Once"	Glenhall Taylor	Dick Sargent	May 14, 1974
"Today Glenhall Taylor's story of a mysterious death..."
78	"Reward"	Keith Walker	Dick Sargent	May 15, 1974
"Today Keith Walker's oblique look into the other side of crime..."
79	"Villainous Verdict"	Glenhall Taylor	Dick Sargent	May 16, 1974
"Today Glenhall Taylor's drama of deception and death..."
80	"Strange Odyssey of Sandy Mitchell"	Keith Walker	Dick Sargent	May 17, 1974
"Today Keith Walker's spine-tingling tale of the supernatural..." Featured in the cast: Casey Kasem
81	"White Flame Burning Bright"	Glenhall Taylor	Lyle Waggoner	May 20, 1974
"Today Glenhall Taylor's macabre adventure in pyromania..."
82	"Mind of the Beholder"	Kim Weiskopf	Lyle Waggoner	May 21, 1974
"Today Kim Weiskopf's sidelong glance at a small town entanglement..."
83	"Why Is Ted Marcosi Driving Aunt Sally Insane?"	Keith Walker	Lyle Waggoner	May 22, 1974
"Today Keith Walker's romp through the ? of horror..."
84	"There is a Man in 211"	Kim Weiskopf	Lyle Waggoner	May 23, 1974
"Today Kim Weiskopf's strange saga of apartment living..."
85	"Death is a Puppeteer"	Glenhall Taylor	Lyle Waggoner	May 24, 1974
"Today Glenhall Taylor's story of murder in a theater..."
86	"Dr. Rivington, Presumably"	Kim Weiskopf	William Shatner	May 27, 1974
"Today Kim Weiskopf's health chart of an epidemic family..."
87	"Wanted: A Willing Companion"	Kim Weiskopf	William Shatner	May 28, 1974
"Today Kim Weiskopf’s overview of an underground newspaper ad..."
88	"Pigs Could Put You in the Pen"	Glenhall Taylor	William Shatner	May 29, 1974
"Today Glenhall Taylor's drama of a macabre humor..."
89	"Sky Lab Are You There?"	Keith Walker	William Shatner	May 30, 1974
"Today Keith Walker's double tale of terror in space..."
90	"Favor You Can't Refuse"	Keith Walker	William Shatner	May 31, 1974
"Today Keith Walker's caustic account of disorganized crime..."
91	"Death at Half a Length"	Keith Walker	Greg Morris	June 3, 1974
"Today Keith Walker's drama at the races..."
92	"Floating Down the River"	Glenhall Taylor	Greg Morris	June 4, 1974
"Today Glenhall Taylor's tale of a watery grave..."
93	"Once a Thief"	Kim Weiskopf	Greg Morris	June 5, 1974
"Today Kim Weiskopf's thumbnail sketch of a light-fingered filcher..."
94	"Other Sins Only Speak, Murder Shrieks Out"	Glenhall Taylor	Greg Morris	June 6, 1974
"Today Glenhall Taylor's story of a murderous triangle..."
95	"Rehabilitation of Citizen Fimple"	Keith Walker	Greg Morris	June 7, 1974
"Today Keith Walker's whimsical tale of love and crime..."
96	"Bonnie and Clyde are Alive and Living as Mary and Bill"	Glenhall Taylor	Lee Meriwether	June 10, 1974
"Today Glenhall Taylor's study in violence..."
97	"Sisters of Satan"	Glenhall Taylor	Lee Meriwether	June 11, 1974
"Today Glenhall Taylor's suspenseful drama of a peaceful but dangerous mission..."
98	"The Mannequin Sham"	Kim Weiskopf	Lee Meriwether	June 12, 1974
"Today Kim Weiskopf's unmasking of a consumer fraud..." Featured in the cast: Les Tremayne
99	"Double Date to Destiny"	Keith Walker	Lee Meriwether	June 13, 1974
"Today Keith Walker's chilling story of assassination..."
100	"Clay Pigeons"	Kim Weiskopf	Lee Meriwether	June 14, 1974
"Today Kim Weiskopf's study of cinema murder come to life..."
101	"Past is Always Present"	Glenhall Taylor	Peter Lupus	June 17, 1974
"Today Glenhall Taylor's suspensful drama of a hidden drama..."
102	"Woman in Black"	Sue Dunham	Peter Lupus	June 18, 1974
"Today Sue Dunham's postmortem of a vicious cycle..."
103	"Come Light My Fire"	Glenhall Taylor	Peter Lupus	June 19, 1974
"Today Glenhall Taylor's offbeat story of people who play with matches... and death..."
104	"Riders Wanted: Share Expenses"	Sue Dunham	Peter Lupus	June 20, 1974
"Today Sue Dunham's trackdown of a curious caravan..." Featured in the cast: Casey Kasem
105	"Death on Canvas"	Sue Dunham	Peter Lupus	June 21, 1974
"Today Sue Dunham's portrait of an artist in trouble..." Featured in the cast: Casey Kasem
106	"House That Clemont Built"	Keith Walker	Shelley Berman	June 24, 1974
"Today Keith Walker's hilarious tale of death by error..."
107	"Joint Account"	Kim Weiskopf	Shelley Berman	June 25, 1974
"Today Kim Weiskopf's bank statement of miscalculations..."
108	"Tiger Cages"	Keith Walker	Shelley Berman	June 26, 1974
"Today Keith Walker's nasty tale of political chicanery..."
109	"Violence Takes a Curtain Call"	Glenhall Taylor	Shelley Berman	June 27, 1974
"Today Glenhall Taylor's tragedy of murder in a theater..."
110	"Children Are Dying"	Keith Walker	Shelley Berman	June 28, 1974
"Today Keith Walker's hellish tale of heroin on the streets..."
111	"Bend, Spindle and Mutilate"	Sue Dunham	Bob Crane	July 1, 1974
"Today Sue Dunham's computer readout of automated murder..."
112	"Murder is a Work of Art"	Glenhall Taylor	Bob Crane	July 2, 1974
"Today Glenhall Taylor's eerie drama of mummies and revenge..."
113	"Edwards Tug and Salvage"	Keith Walker	Bob Crane	July 3, 1974
"Today Keith Walker's low comedy on the high seas..."
114	"Larceny on the Lake"	Glenhall Taylor	Bob Crane	July 4, 1974
"Today Glenhall Taylor's story of an FBI agent who almost loses his life in the line of duty..."
115	"OLAM aka On the Lam aka The Lamb(s)"	Keith Walker	Bob Crane	July 5, 1974
"Today Keith Walker's outsized story of heroism in Korea..."
116	"Corpse Takes a Sleigh Ride"	Glenhall Taylor	Monte Markham	July 8, 1974
"Today Glenhall Taylor's chiller drama of blood in the snow..."
117	"Marionettes"	Sue Dunham	Monte Markham	July 9, 1974
"Today Sue Dunham's eerie tale of 'no strings attached'..."
118	"Ghost of the Black Plague"	Keith Walker	Monte Markham	July 10, 1974
"Today Keith Walker's gothic tale of revenge..." Featured in the cast: Peggy Walton, Ben Wright, Parley Baer, Rhoda Williams, and Daws Butler.
119	"Trunkful of Trouble"	Glenhall Taylor	Monte Markham	July 11, 1974
"Today Glenhall Taylor's gruesome account of murders in a ? house..."
120	"Grand Prize"	Sue Dunham	Monte Markham	July 12, 1974
"Today Sue Dunham's bizarre quiz program aftermath..."
121	"Welcome Home Denny Shackleford"	Sue Dunham	Joe Campanella	July 15, 1974
"Today Sue Dunham's front row seat at a family reunion..."
122	"Death of a Genius"	Glenhall Taylor	Joe Campanella	July 16, 1974
"Today Glenhall Taylor's dramatic account of a shocking murder..."
123	"Remember Me?"	Gus Bayes	Joe Campanella	July 17, 1974
"Today a story by Gus C. Bayes of love and murder..."
124	"Lost in Time"	Keith Walker	Joe Campanella	July 18, 1974
"Today Keith Walker's frightening voyage into the past..."
125	"Once Upon a Truck"	Sue Dunham	Joe Campanella	July 19, 1974
"Today Sue Dunham's nursery rhyme of highjacking..."
126	"Corpse Takes a Stand"	Glenhall Taylor	Ross Martin	July 22, 1974
"Today Glenhall Taylor's weird tale of a cadaver in a courtroom..."
127	"Carnival of Menace"	Glenhall Taylor	Ross Martin	July 23, 1974
"Today Glenhall Taylor's black episode of circus life..."
128	"Chicago John and The Glitter People"	Kim Weiskopf	Ross Martin	July 24, 1974
"Today Kim Weiskopf's oblique excursion down Tin Pan Alley..." Featured in the cast: Daws Butler
129	"Smoke Screen"	Glenhall Taylor	Ross Martin	July 25, 1974
"Today Glenhall Taylor's story of a small-town lawman with a big-time mind..."
130	"The Holdout"	Gus Bayes	Ross Martin	July 26, 1974
"Today a story by Gus C. Bayes about a jury... and justice..."
