= A Reflection of Fear =

1972 American horror film by William A. Fraker

- Theatrical release poster
- Directed by: William A. Fraker
- Screenplay by: Edward Hume; Lewis John Carlino
- Produced by: Howard B. Jaffe
- Starring: Robert Shaw; Mary Ure; Sally Kellerman; Sondra Locke
- Cinematography: László Kovács
- Edited by: Richard K. Brockway
- Music by: Fred Myrow
- Distributed by: Columbia Pictures
- Release date: November 15, 1972
- Running time: 89 minutes
- Country: United States
- Language: English

A Reflection of Fear is a 1972 American horror thriller film directed by William A. Fraker with a screenplay by Edward Hume and Lewis John Carlino and starring Sondra Locke, Robert Shaw, Mary Ure, Signe Hasso, Gordon Devol and Sally Kellerman. It is based on the novel Go to Thy Deathbed by Stanton Forbes.

The film spent a long time on the shelf. Principal photography was completed in the early part of 1971, but its premiere was not until late 1972 and its general release was not until the winter of 1973. Lead actress Locke was nearly twice the age of her character. (Note: In all the time that Locke was getting headlines, from the 1960s through the 1990s, no news agency ever bothered to verify her age claims with official documentation. Nor did any Clint Eastwood biographers in books where Locke is the secondary theme. Certain regional outlets managed to get it right, but only on rare occasions.) Although Ure played Locke's mother, she was in fact only eleven years older than Locke.

== Plot ==
The film is set in an alienated mansion in Eastern Canada that houses Marguerite, 15, the main protagonist, her mother Katherine and her maternal grandmother, Julia.

Marguerite suffers from what appears to be paranoia as is apparent when she is shown talking to her dolls, especially one named Aaron or an amoeba collected from a pond, or painting unsettling pictures in seclusion. She also takes daily shots of what she believes is insulin, although the labels have been removed.

Out of the blue, she expresses her yearning to connect with her father, Michael, a writer, who was estranged from the family for a decade and is now in a relationship with a woman named Anne. Katherine and Julia take issue with Marguerite's desire, but Michael, on the pretext of obtaining a divorce from Katherine, arrives at the hamlet with Anne and feels the need to fortify his relationship with his daughter.

In time, Marguerite's affection for her father turns inordinate and her sense of insecurity escalates as she is seen spying on the members of the household through crevices. "Aaron" murders Katherine in her bed with the aid of a wooden pole and also kills Julia.

Following these incidents, Marguerite is comforted by her father who arranges for an outing to a local beach for Marguerite, Anne and himself. It is evident to Anne that the father-daughter relationship between Michael and Marguerite is excessive as is revealed by their immoderate physical contact and Michael's doting on her, even disregarding Anne who walks away dejectedly to be met with a knowing look from Hector, the young man at the inn.

After the picnic, Anne confronts Michael about his questionable behavior towards his daughter, following which they attempt to make love. Marguerite is shown masturbating in her room, crying out for her father when she approaches her climax. The couple can hear this and it deeply disturbs Anne, who tells Michael they are all sick and leaves the house. As she is traveling to the inn, someone in a raincoat walks in front of her car and calls out her name. She believes this to be Hector and stops on the side of the road to speak to him. She falls down a hill and is then attacked by a hooded assailant, but is rendered safe by an unknown figure. She returns to the house and apologizes to Michael for leaving.

The next day, Hector takes Marguerite out on his boat and gives her beer before he attempts to seduce her. Marguerite is clearly anxious, but allows him to touch her as the screen fades to black. In the next scene Hector's boat has mysteriously spiraled out of control dashing on the rocky shore and killing him. Marguerite survives and is taken away from the scene of the accident by medical personnel. Michael and Anne are shown taking her home and on the way Michael tells Marguerite that he has made a call to Boston.

That night, Marguerite seems to know that the call to Boston means she will be "taken away" and Michael confirms this to her. She blames Aaron for everything and asks permission to show Michael how he has hurt them all, which he allows. Michael and Anne hear sounds of breaking glass upstairs; when Michael goes up to investigate, a hooded figure dressed in black attacks him. He repels the attack and the assailant runs from him. As the attacker tries to escape through the crawl spaces of the home, it revealed to be Marguerite in the personality of Aaron, who repeatedly assaults Michael as he continues the pursuit.

At last she stops attacking him and retreats, collapsing in a corner, unmasking herself and sobbing. As he comes toward her with a troubled expression, we hear a recording of the Boston call he made to the hospital where Marguerite was delivered; he asks for information about a baby girl born to Katherine Sterling 16 years ago, but the records department informs him that Katherine had delivered not a girl but a boy.

== Cast ==
- Sondra Locke as Marguerite
- Robert Shaw as Michael
- Mary Ure as Katherine
- Sally Kellerman as Anne
- Mitchell Ryan as Inspector McKenna
- Signe Hasso as Julia
- Gordon Anderson as Aaron (voice only)
- Gordon Devol as Hector
- Leonard Crofoot as Aaron
- Michael St. Clair as Kevin
- Victoria Risk as Peggy
- Liam Dunn as the Coroner
- Michelle Marvin as the Nurse
- Michele Montau as Madame Caraquet

== Reception ==
Roger Greenspun of The New York Times stated that "Sondra Locke has a virtuoso role, and I guess she is impressive, and Sally Kellerman is downright good. But "A Reflection of Fear" has been so ponderously paced and fatally overdecorated that performances can't count for much." In his review on DVD Talk, Paul Mavis writes, "there's no getting around the fact that much of A Reflection of Fear flat-out doesn't make sense. And that's okay up to a certain point, because the main story arc still comes through fairly clearly, and the scares and atmosphere help make up for the film's other shortcomings." TV Guide lauded Locke's delivery of her character, saying, "Locke is very effective in her psychotic role, giving the story an eerie quality that is otherwise lacking."

== See also ==
- Dissociative identity disorder
- Electra complex
- Killer toys
- Incest in popular culture
- Oedipus complex
