= Kim Weiskopf =

American screenwriter

- Born: Kim Robert Weiskopf; April 10, 1947; New York City, New York, United States
- Died: April 22, 2009 (aged 62); Encino, California, United States
- Occupations: Television screenwriter, producer
- Years active: 1977–1997
- Spouse(s): Jody Legendre, 1980–2009, his death
- Children: Kate Weiskopf (daughter)
- Parent(s): Bob Weiskopf, Eileen Ito Weiskopf

Kim Weiskopf (April 10, 1947 – April 22, 2009) was an American television writer and producer, whose credits included Three's Company, Married... with Children, One Day at a Time, The Jeffersons and Good Times. Kim was the son of fellow TV producer/writer/director Bob Weiskopf.

Born in New York City, he had solo writer-producer credits on such shows as Rachel Gunn, R.N., Full House, and Married... with Children. He served as executive producer (show runner) on Married...with Children and in the final few seasons voiced the family dog, Buck. He once owned the production company North Ave. Productions, based at 20th Century Fox Television. In 1984, he transferred, along with writing partner Michael Baser, to Columbia Pictures Television.

Weiskopf's writing and producing career spanned from 1972 with Rod Serling's radio show, The Zero Hour in the 1970s, to What's Happening Now, and to Married... with Children in the 1980s and early/mid 1990s. He also was beloved by writers who he mentored and supported up until his death in 2009.

== Education ==
He moved to Los Angeles with his family at the age of five and attended Grant High School in Van Nuys, and San Francisco State University.

== Death ==
Weiskopf died from pancreatic cancer in the Encino neighborhood of Los Angeles on April 22, 2009.
