= The Third Secret (film) =

1964 film by Charles Crichton

- Original poster
- Directed by: Charles Crichton
- Written by: Robert L. Joseph
- Produced by: Robert L. Joseph; Hugh Perceval (uncredited)
- Starring: Stephen Boyd; Jack Hawkins; Richard Attenborough; Diane Cilento; Pamela Franklin; Paul Rogers; Alan Webb
- Cinematography: Douglas Slocombe
- Edited by: Frederick Wilson
- Music by: Richard Arnell
- Color process: Black and white
- Production company: Hubris Productions
- Distributed by: 20th Century Fox
- Release dates: 28 April 1964 (New York City); 15 November 1964 (United Kingdom)
- Running time: 103 minutes
- Country: United Kingdom
- Language: English
- Budget: $600,000
- Box office: $615,000

The Third Secret is a 1964 British CinemaScope neo-noir psychological mystery thriller film directed by Charles Crichton, and starring Stephen Boyd, Jack Hawkins, Richard Attenborough, Diane Cilento, Pamela Franklin, Paul Rogers, Alan Webb and Judi Dench (in her film debut). The screenplay by Robert L. Joseph focuses on an American newscaster who investigates the mysterious death of his psychoanalyst. According to the film, there are three kinds of secrets; the first, you keep from others; the second, you keep from yourself, and the third is the truth.

== Plot ==
Prominent London psychoanalyst Dr. Leo Whitset is discovered injured from a gunshot wound in his home by his housekeeper, and as he lies dying he whispers, "blame no one but me". These words lead the coroner to rule the death a suicide, a verdict questioned by one of Dr. Whitset's patients, Alex Stedman, a successful American news commentator for British television who has been in therapy since the death of his wife and daughter. The dead man's 14-year-old daughter Catherine is certain he was murdered, and she enlists Alex's aid in finding the killer to preserve her father's reputation.

Catherine provides Alex with the names of three other patients. Sir Frederick Belline is a respected judge, Alfred Price-Gorham runs a prestigious art gallery with his assistant Miss Humphries, and Anne Tanner is a corporate secretary. As Alex investigates their backgrounds, he discovers each of them, like himself, harbours a secret known only by the murdered man. Hoping to find more clues, Alex goes to the doctor's country home to search his files. There he learns Catherine was under her father's care, and when he confronts her, she admits she killed the doctor when he threatened to send her to an institution to be treated for paranoid schizophrenia. While re-enacting the crime, Catherine stabs Alex. She is confined to a psychiatric hospital, where Alex, recovered from his wounds, visits her and promises to stay in touch. The secret the doctor had hidden from himself was the seriousness of his daughter's illness, which made him delay committing her to a mental institution.

== Cast ==
- Stephen Boyd as Alex Stedman
- Jack Hawkins as Sir Frederick Belline
- Richard Attenborough as Alfred Price-Gorham
- Diane Cilento as Anne Tanner
- Pamela Franklin as Catherine Whitset
- Paul Rogers as Dr. Milton Gillen
- Alan Webb as Alden Hoving
- Rachel Kempson as Mildred Hoving
- Peter Sallis as Lawrence Jacks
- Patience Collier as Mrs. Pelton
- Freda Jackson as Mrs. Bales
- Judi Dench as Miss Humphries
- Peter Copley as Dr. Leo Whitset
- Nigel Davenport as Lew Harding
- Charles Lloyd-Pack as Dermot McHenry
- Barbara Hicks as Police Secretary
- Ronald Leigh-Hunt as Police Officer
- Geoffrey Adams as Floor Manager
- James Maxwell as Mark
- Gerald Case as Mr. Bickes
- Sarah Brackett as Nurse
- Neal Arden as Mr. Morgan

== Production ==
Patricia Neal was cast as one of the doctor's patients, but all her scenes were cut from the film before it was released.

Crichton said he "really made" the film "because I needed a job" although he felt it "was quite an interesting picture." He says after they finished making the film the Zanucks took over Fox "and Zanuck decided he wanted to make pictures for the family and this was a strange mad picture so he cut out most of the mad bits which didn't help."

== Box-office ==
According to Fox records, the film needed to earn $1,300,000 in film rentals to break even, and it made $615,000, resulting in a loss.

== Critical reception ==
The Monthly Film Bulletin wrote: "Distressingly but understandably at a loss with much of Robert L. Joseph's aimless and obscure scenario, Crichton does what he can to keep up visual interest on the psychological thriller level. The curious result is an agitated assortment of styles embroidering a film which never comes to grips with what it appears to be talking about. To judge from the strange interlude with Paul Rogers ... we are meant to learn some home truths about schizophrenia, paranoia, psychotics and the like. Numberless accusations and implications follow, but we remain uninstructed even after the murderer's identity has been noisily disclosed. Stephen Boyd sees it through with an appropriate air of puzzled innocence, quite acceptably accompanied by a maturing Pamela Franklin; in vignette appearances, Jack Hawkins and Diane Cilento battle valiantly against cruel mishandling and impossible lines. Richard Attenborough transforms the film for a few brief moments by making the utmost of his completely irrelevant role as the art dealer; he achieves a portrait both amusing and pathetic of a weak but vain man struggling desperately to justify his existence. Alas, nothing else is so good. Despite its superficially intriguing oddities ... this is an unappealing and irritatingly muddled scribble of a film, thoroughly lacking in suspense, veracity and justification."

Howard Thompson of The New York Times wrote that the film "is recommended only to practitioners, patients and other moviegoers with a wry sense of humor. For in probing Freudian motivations and behavior to solve a crime, the picture obliquely strings out like a strand of loose spaghetti." He added: "[It] uncoils and meanders so deviously and pretentiously, and the dialogue slips into such metaphorical mishmash that the result is more often exasperating than entertaining – or convincing. The music, telegraphing dire things to come, is an atonal teaser." He concluded "[It] presses so hard for conversational effect and mood that simple suspense occurs only toward the end. The denouement is a good, logical shocker – unsurprising if you study the smoothest talker of the lot."

Variety called the film "an engrossing, if not altogether convincing, mystery melodrama of the weighty psychological school."

TV Guide rated the film 2½ out of four stars and commented: "The episodic, talky drama has some moments that overcome the script's deficiencies, but the film tends to be pretentious and deliberately obtuse. The performances are only adequate. Franklin is particularly good, however, as the troubled young girl."

Kate Cameron of the New York Daily News, gave the film three stars out of four, calling it "pretentious" but feeling it was saved by its competent direction and strong performances, particularly praising the cast's portrayals of various neurotic characters.

Mae Tinee of the Chicago Tribune, described the film as an "engrossing" British thriller, praising its suspense and performances, particularly those of Stephen Boyd and Pamela Franklin, while noting that the script was talkative and the mystery's solution somewhat predictable. The film was also featured in his guide list of excellent films.

Jeremy Arnold of Turner Classic Movies said that the film suffers from an episodic structure, occasionally pretentious dialogue, and uneven performances from Stephen Boyd and Pamela Franklin. Arnold praised the film for its atmospheric black‑and‑white CinemaScope cinematography, creepy yet elegant score and its intriguing story. He also praised it for its supporting cast—particularly Jack Hawkins, Richard Attenborough, and Diane Cilento and the moody London locations.

== Home video ==
The film has been released on DVD in the US (20th Century Fox, 2007) and UK (Odeon Entertainment, 2012), and on Blu-ray in the UK (Powerhouse Films, 2019).
