= Britt Lomond =

American actor

- Born: April 12, 1925; Chicago, Illinois, US
- Died: March 22, 2006 (aged 80); Huntington Beach, California, US
- Occupation: Actor
- Years active: 1956–1983
- Spouse: Diane Lomond
- Children: 2
- Awards: Silver Star Bronze Star Purple Heart

Britt Lomond (April 12, 1925 – March 22, 2006) was an American actor and television producer. Also credited as Glase Lohman.

Born in Chicago, Illinois, Lomond was raised in New York City. He received three Purple Hearts, a Silver Star, and a Bronze Star for his military service as an Army paratrooper during World War II.

He was a student at New York University after the war.

Lomond was active with NYU's fencing team, and he earned a place on the United States' fencing team for the 1952 Olympics. Instead of going that route, he began fencing as a professional in productions on stage and in films.

In 1956, Lomond played the Spaniard James Addison Reavis in the episode "The Baron of Arizona" of the anthology series, Death Valley Days, hosted by Stanley Andrews. In the story line, two newspapermen doubt Reavis' claim to millions of acres in the New Mexico Territory, which then included Arizona. Though Reavis' papers seem authentic and date to colonial times, the reporters prove them to be fraudulent.'

Lomond is best known for his role as Capitán Monasterio in the first season of Disney's Zorro. He also played the role of General George Armstrong Custer in the Disney film Tonka. On television he made a guest appearance on Perry Mason as he played the role of title character and murder victim Jack Culross in the 1961 episode, "The Case of the Posthumous Painter." In 1963 Lomond appeared as Kyle Lawson on The Virginian in the episode titled "If You Have Tears."

He was a unit production manager for The Waltons, Somewhere in Time, and Falcon Crest. He was also known for being a first assistant director for Battlestar Galactica and MacGyver.

== Death ==
On March 22, 2006, Lomond died of kidney failure at a nursing home in Huntington Beach, California, at age 80. He was survived by his wife, a son, and a daughter.

== Paintings ==
Britt Lomond also painted.

BRITTINI was a commercial art studio in the 1960s, in Los Angeles, California. The studio was owned by three people, actor Britt Lomond, his father-in-law, and Loraine Miller.

In addition to producing vast numbers of "sofa art" paintings, the Brittini artists also did extensive muraling in the Grauman's Egyptian Theatre, in Hollywood, in 1964 (those paintings are now gone, the theatre has been remodeled). The paintings were usually of ships, with raised texture, using white glue tinted black with acrylic paint.

== Filmography ==
- 1953: Death Valley Days (TV Series) - Lew Darby / Season 1, Episode 11 / "The Lady with the Blue Silk Umbrella" / credited as Glase Lohman
- 1955-1956: Navy Log (TV Series) - Lt. Fraser / Executive Officer / Carrigio
- 1956: Highway Patrol (TV Series) - Highway Patrolman Melton
- 1956: The Count of Monte Cristo (TV Series) - De Crissac
- 1956: Annie Oakley (TV Series) - Gentleman Jim Corbett
- 1956-1959: Death Valley Days (TV Series, in two episodes, one as James Reavis "The Baron of Arizona") - Kurt Mahler / Faro Bill / James Addison Reavis
- 1957: Cheyenne (TV Series) - Lt. Phil Poole
- 1957: The Saga of Andy Burnett: Andy's Love Affair (TV Series) - Captain Paco Reyes
- 1957: The Gray Ghost (TV Series) - Larson
- 1957-1958: Zorro (TV Series) - Capitán Monastario
- 1958: Tonka - Gen. George Armstrong Custer
- 1958: Death Valley Days (TV Series) Season 7, Episode 14, "A Piano Goes West" - Kurt Mahler
- 1958-1959: 26 Men (TV Series) - Colonel Kesterlitzky aka 'El Tigre' / Dayton Borg
- 1959: Colt .45 (TV Series, in "A Legend of Buffalo Bill") - Buffalo Bill Cody
- 1959: Men into Space (TV Series) - Bruegel
- 1959: Tombstone Territory (TV Series) - Jay Pell
- 1959: Bat Masterson (TV Series) - Latimer
- 1960: Tales of Wells Fargo (TV Series) - Gerald Haggerty
- 1960: Young Jesse James - Yankee Officer
- 1960: The Brothers Brannagan (TV Series) - Larry Randolph
- 1960: Klondike (TV Series) - Clete Slade
- 1960-1961: The Life and Legend of Wyatt Earp (TV Series) - Johnny Ringo
- 1961: Lock Up (TV Series) - Patrolman Larry Wade
- 1961: Dick Powell's Zane Grey Theater (TV Series) - Logan Drew - the Atoner
- 1961: Thriller (TV Series) - Arnold Chase
- 1961: The Case of the Dangerous Robin (TV Series)
- 1961: Peter Gunn (TV Series) - Gil Manson
- 1961: Perry Mason (TV Series) - Jack Culross
- 1961: Rawhide – Dario in S4:E8, "The Prairie Elephant"
- 1963: The Virginian (TV Series) - Kyle Lawson
- 1967: I Spy (TV Series) - Psychologist
- 1967: Mission: Impossible (TV Series) - Thornton
- 1983: Simon & Simon (TV Series) - Jerry Gelson (final appearance)
