= Joe Tiffenbach =

American filmmaker, cinematographer, actor, and physique model (1923–1992)

- Born: Joseph William Tiffenbach Jr. December 31, 1923; Los Angeles County, California, U.S.
- Died: January 27, 1992 (aged 68); Cedar City, Iron County, Utah, U. S.
- Resting place: Los Angeles National Cemetery
- Other names: Lou Alton; Bill Loughtus
- Occupations: Filmmaker; Cinematographer; Actor; Producer; Physique model
- Years active: 1946–1992
- Agent: Jaguar Productions
- Awards: 1984 GPA Pioneer Award

Joseph William Tiffenbach Jr. (December 31, 1923 – January 27, 1992), also known by the pseudonym Lou Alton and Bill Loughtus, was an American filmmaker, cinematographer, actor, and physique model. He is recognized as a pioneer in the gay adult film industry, bridging the gap between the mid-century "physique" era and the Stonewall era of gay liberation cinema. In 1984, he was a recipient of the Gay Producers Association (GPA) Pioneer Award.

== Early life and military service ==
Tiffenbach was born in Los Angeles County, California, to Joseph and Mary Tiffenbach. In July 1943, during World War II, he enlisted in the United States Army Air Corps. Following his honorable discharge in 1946, he returned to Los Angeles to pursue a college education.

== Career ==
=== Hollywood connections and television ===
While in college, Tiffenbach was introduced to William "Billy" Haines, a former silent film star turned interior designer. Through Haines, Tiffenbach entered an influential circle of gay Hollywood elite, meeting agent John Darrow and director/choreographer Charles "Chuck" Walters known for High Society and The Unsinkable Molly Brown.

With the assistance of Darrow and Walters, Tiffenbach secured a position in the mail room at 20th Century Fox. He eventually transitioned into professional production roles, including the creation of travel films and working on location for major studio features. Tiffenbach also contributed to mainstream television, writing the episode "Pirates of San Francisco" for the long-running Western anthology series Death Valley Days.

=== Physique modeling and photography ===
Starting in the late 1940s, Tiffenbach became a figure in the "physique" movement, modeling for prominent photographers such as Bob Mizer founder of Athletic Model Guild), Bruce of L.A., Ralph Kelly, Frederick Kovert, and Dave Martin. He frequently appeared in Physique Pictorial, a publication that served as a coded outlet for homoerotic art during a period of strict censorship.

By the 1960s, Tiffenbach transitioned from the front of the camera to behind it. He began producing his own physique photography and transitioned into filming gay erotica following the 1962 Supreme Court ruling in MANual Enterprises v. Day, which eased restrictions on gay male publications.

=== Acting ===
As the industry moved toward hardcore content in the 1970s, Tiffenbach occasionally appeared on-screen. His most notable acting credit is in Adonis Cockplay 18 (1977), where he performed under the name Lou Alton. Tiffenbach's appearance in this film as Lou Alton had a significant cultural impact. Seeing a veteran model from the "hidden" 1950s era perform in a hardcore production was a major event for the gay community. It effectively bridged the gap between the "coded" fitness modeling of his youth and the explicit sexual liberation of the 1970s. Even at age 53, his appearance was marketed as a reunion with a "classic" star, solidifying his status as a long-term icon.

=== Film and cinematography ===
Tiffenbach, often working as Lou Alton, was known for bringing professional studio production values to early gay cinema. He served as a cinematographer for Song of the Loon this landmark softcore film based on the Richard Amory novels. In the early 1970s, he directed several "Jaguar" classics, including The Baredevils (1971) and the Western-themed Sudden Rawhide (1971).

Tiffenbach founded and organized "The Uncut Club," a niche publication and social group that focused on the appreciation of uncircumcised men. He continued to direct and write into the 1980s, with credits including Bathhouse Fantasies (1983) and Tall Tales (1986).

=== Writing and memoirs ===
In the early 1990s, Tiffenbach authored a series of articles for Inches magazine. These writings served as a memoir of gay life in "Old Hollywood," detailing his personal interactions with stars such as Debbie Reynolds, Doris Day, Steve Reeves, and the long-term partnership of William Haines and Jimmie Shields. He also co-authored the book Foreskin: A Closer Look with Bud Berkeley. He died before the memoirs were fully completed. Later Bud Berkeley completed it and released it.

=== Filmmaking and photography ===
By the 1960s, Tiffenbach began producing his own physique photography and erotic films. He was known for a "naturalist" style, often shooting outdoors to emphasize a rugged, masculine aesthetic.

== Death ==
Tiffenbach died of a heart attack on January 27, 1992, at the age of 68. He is buried at the Los Angeles National Cemetery (Section C, Row 29, Site 24).

== Filmography ==
=== Television ===
Year	Title	Role	Notes
1960	Death Valley Days	Writer (Story)	Episode: "Pirates of San Francisco"

=== Actor ===
Year	Title	Role	Notes
1977	Adonis Cockplay 18	Lou Alton	Debut

=== Director ===
Year	Title	Notes
1969	The Closet	Credited as Bill Loughtus
1971	The Baredevils	Credited as Lou Alton
1971	Sudden Rawhide	Credited as Lou Alton
1974	The Importance of Values	Short film
1983	Bathhouse Fantasies	
1984	Uncut	
1986	Tall Tales	
1986	Uncle Mike Meets Howard	
1986	Wrestling Studs	
1987	Bullet Videopac 10	
1988	Bullet Videopac 11	
1988	Foreskin Strokers 1	
1988	Foreskin Strokers 2	
1988	Just Naked Men	
1989	More Naked Men	
1989	Stark Naked Men	
1990	Bare Ass Men	
1991	Men Without Clothes	

=== Writer ===
Year	Title	Notes
1969	The Closet	
1971	The Baredevils	Credited as Lou Alton
1984	Uncut	
1986	Uncle Mike Meets Howard	
1986	Wrestling Studs	
1987	Bullet Videopac 10	
1988	Foreskin Strokers 1 & 2	
1988	Just Naked Men	
1989	More Naked Men	
1989	Stark Naked Men	
1990	Bare Ass Men	
1991	Men Without Clothes	

=== Producer ===
Year	Title	Notes
1969	The Closet	
1986	Wrestling Studs	
1986	Dynastud	
1987	Bullet Videopac 10	

=== Cinematographer ===
Year	Title	Notes
1969	The Closet	
1970	Song of the Loon	
1971	The Baredevils	Credited as Lou Alton
1971	Sudden Rawhide	Credited as Lou Alton
1971	Sexual Liberty Now	Credited as Joseph Tiffenbach
1973	Truck It	
1986	Wrestling Studs	

=== Editor ===
Year	Title	Notes
1983	Bathhouse Fantasies	

== Legacy ==
In 1984, his lifelong contributions to the industry were honored with the Gay Producers Association Pioneer Award.

== Awards and nominations ==
Name of the award ceremony, year presented, category, nominee of the award, and the result of the nomination
Award ceremony	Year	Category	Nominee / Work	Result	Ref.
Gay Producers Association Pioneer Awards	1984	Best Producer	Contributions to the Porn Industry	Won	

== See also ==
- Golden Age of Porn
- Physique photography
