= Robert L. Joseph =

American dramatist

- Born: March 10, 1923; The Bronx, New York, United States
- Died: April 27, 2002 (aged 79); East Chatham, New York, United States
- Occupations: Producer, writer

Robert L. Joseph (March 10, 1923, in The Bronx, New York – April 27, 2002, in East Chatham, New York) was an American theatre producer, playwright, and screenwriter.

Joseph's Broadway credits included revivals of King Lear, Major Barbara, and Heartbreak Hotel. His 1960 play Face of a Hero starred Jack Lemmon, Edward Asner, Sandy Dennis, and George Grizzard, but closed after two previews and thirty-six performances. He had even less success two years later with Isle of Children, starring Patty Duke and Bonnie Bedelia, which closed after only eleven performances. He later adapted the story as a screenplay which appeared in 1976 as Echoes of a Summer, starring Jodie Foster.

Joseph's other screen credits include The Hitch-Hiker and The Third Secret. For television he wrote the miniseries World War III, an adaptation of the Sidney Sheldon novel Rage of Angels, the television movie SST: Death Flight, and teleplays for Kraft Suspense Theatre and Hallmark Hall of Fame.

Joseph died on April 27, 2002, of head injuries suffered in a fall at his home in East Chatham, New York.
