= Stanton Forbes =

American writer

Deloris Florine Stanton Forbes (July 10, 1923 – October 22, 2013) was an American writer. She wrote books and stories under several pseudonyms, including Stanton Forbes, Tobias Wells and DeLoris S. Forbes. She was born Deloris Florine Stanton.

== Biography ==
Forbes was born in Kansas City, Missouri in July 1923. In the 1940s, Forbes worked as a reporter for a local newspaper after attending "what is now Oklahoma State University", then worked as a crime reporter in Baton Rouge, La. before moving to Boston where she married Bill Forbes, an advertising representative for the Boston Herald. From 1958 to 1973, she was an assistant editor of The Wellesley Townsman before moving to St. Martin in 1973.

She was the author of several mystery novels, including A Deadly Kind of Lonely (1971), Buried in So Sweet a Place (1978), The Sad, Sudden Death of My Fair Lady (1971), and Go To Thy Deathbed (1969), which was made into the film A Reflection of Fear.

According to the dust jacket of her novel When the Hearse Goes by (2002), "DeLoris Staton Forbes was the author of 41 published novels… She lived and worked, until her death, in Sanford, FL."

Forbes died in October 2013 at the age of 90.
