= Nat Perrin =

American screenwriter (1905–98)

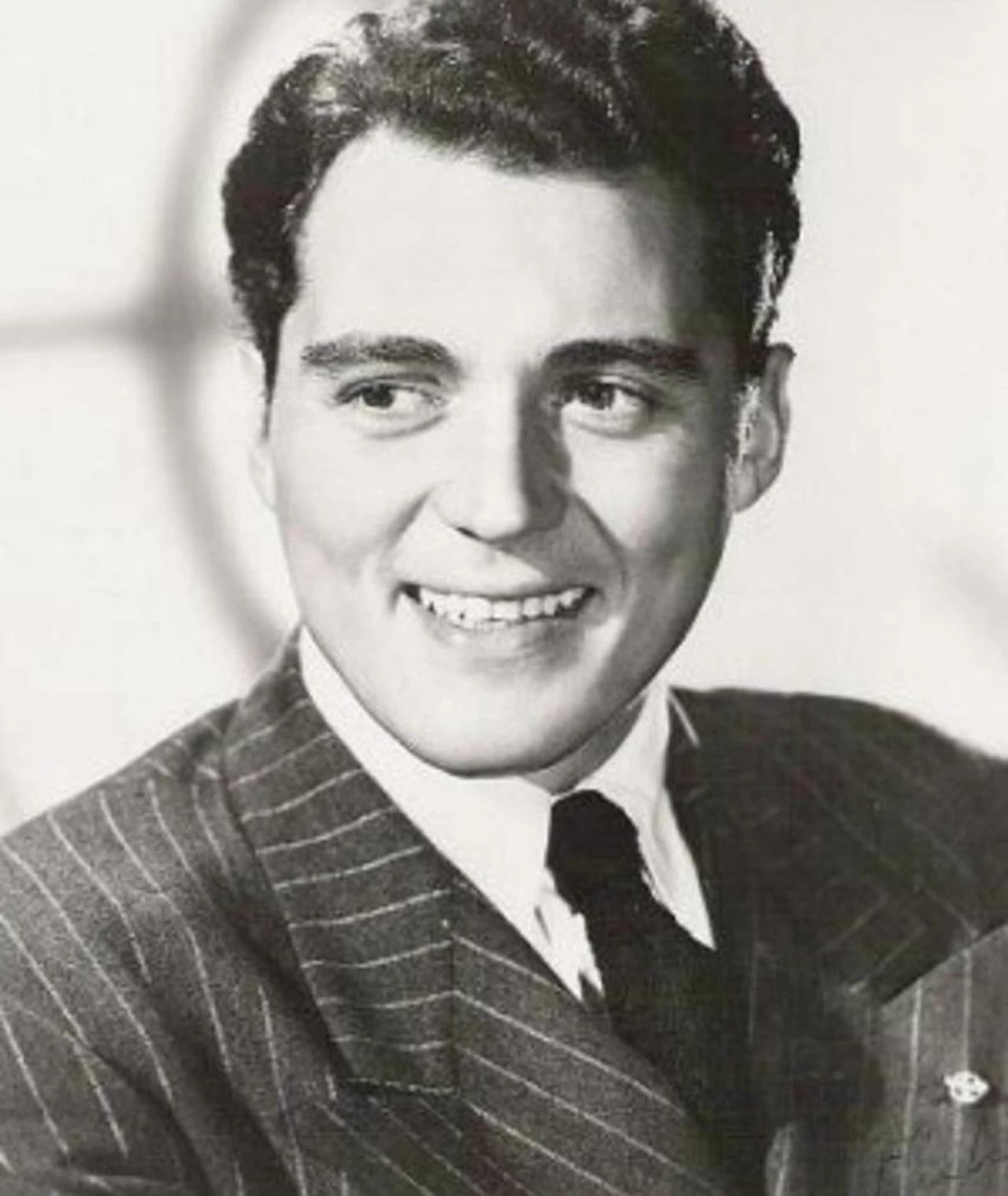
- Born: Nathan Perrin; March 15, 1905; The Bronx, New York
- Died: May 9, 1998 (aged 93); Los Angeles
- Occupations: Film, television and radio comedy screenwriter; producer; director

Nathan "Nat" Perrin (March 15, 1905 – May 9, 1998) was an American comedy film, television, and radio screenwriter, producer, and director, who contributed gags and storylines to several Marx Brothers films and co-wrote the script for the film Hellzapoppin' (1941) adapted from the stage musical. He is credited with writing the screenplay or story outline for over 25 films, including The Big Store (1941), The Great Morgan (1945), and Song of the Thin Man (1947), as well as several television series.

== Biography ==
Perrin was a registered attorney who never practiced; he instead worked in the publicity department for Warner Bros. in 1930. He often told the story of how he made his way into Groucho Marx's dressing room in 1931 with a forged letter of introduction from Moss Hart. Groucho was impressed with Perrin, and arranged for him to be hired by Paramount Pictures. The two became close friends.

Perrin went on to write for the Marx Brothers' films Monkey Business and Duck Soup. Their film The Big Store was developed from an original story by Perrin. He was co-writer of their Flywheel, Shyster, and Flywheel radio shows, with Arthur Sheekman, and often stood in for Chico when he was late for rehearsals.

Perrin contributed gags, punchlines, pratfalls and plots for other comedians including Buster Keaton, Lou Costello, Bob Hope, Gracie Allen, Eddie Cantor and Red Skelton.

In the late 1930s, Perrin produced for Columbia Pictures, moving to Metro-Goldwyn-Mayer in the 1940s. In the early 1950s, he became a producer for such TV shows as The Red Skelton Show (run 1951–1971) and the anthology series Death Valley Days (run 1952–1970). He produced and was head writer for The Addams Family series from 1964 to 1966.

Beginning in the late 1970s and well into his later years, Perrin taught screenwriting and film history at California State University Northridge.

When Groucho's health was steadily declining in 1977, Perrin served as temporary conservator of his estate.
