= Death Valley Days =

American Western anthology series (1952–1970)

- Early title card for Death Valley Days
- Genre: Anthology/Western
- Presented by: Stanley Andrews (1952–1964); Ronald Reagan (1964–1966); Robert Taylor (1966–1969); Dale Robertson (1969–1970)
- Starring: See list
- Narrated by: Merle Haggard (1975 re-broadcasts)
- Theme music composer: Herbert Taylor
- Country of origin: United States
- Original language: English
- No. of seasons: 18
- No. of episodes: 452 (list of episodes)

Production
- Executive producers: Gene Autry; Louis Gray
- Producers: Dorrell McGowan; Nat Perrin; Armand Schaefer; Robert Stabler
- Cinematography: William Bradford; Richard E. Cunha
- Editors: Jack Wheeler; Anthony Wollner
- Running time: 26–36 minutes
- Production companies: McGowan Productions; Flying A Productions; Filmaster Productions; Madison Productions

Original release
- Network: Syndication
- Release: October 1, 1952 – April 24, 1970

Death Valley Days is an American Western anthology television series based on true accounts of the American Old West, particularly the Death Valley country of southeastern California. Created in 1930 by Ruth Woodman, the program was broadcast on radio until 1945. From 1952 to 1970, it became a syndicated television series, with reruns (updated with new narrations) continuing through August 1, 1975. The radio and television versions combined to make the show "one of the longest-running Western programs in broadcast history."

The series was sponsored by the Pacific Coast Borax Company, makers of 20 Mule Team Borax and Boraxo, and hosted by Stanley Andrews ("The Old Ranger") (1952–1964), Ronald Reagan (1964–1966), Robert Taylor (1966–1969), and Dale Robertson (1969–1970). Hosting the series was Reagan's final work as an actor; he left the series in 1966 to run for governor of California.

The television series was conceived by Pacific Coast Borax Company's advertising agency McCann-Erickson through company executive Dorothy McCann and Mitchell J. Hamilburg, who represented Gene Autry's Flying A Productions.

== Synopsis ==
Death Valley Days is one of the first anthology series to appear on television, featuring different characters and stories each episode. The stories were based in fact, mostly within the legends and lore of California's Death Valley. Style varied by episode, with some being drama and others comedy. Most were human-interest stories of miners and homesteaders in Death Valley, where borax was mined.

Advertisements for the company's best-known products, 20 Mule Team Borax, a laundry additive, Borateem, a laundry detergent, and Boraxo, a powdered hand soap, were often done by the program's host.

As the series continued on the air, episodes began to focus on nearly any portion of the American West, not just the Death Valley country. Most episodes portrayed events in the late 19th century, the heyday of the "Old West". Some, however, were set in much earlier times, especially the Spanish colonial era, and a few recounted stories from the early 20th century.

== Cast ==
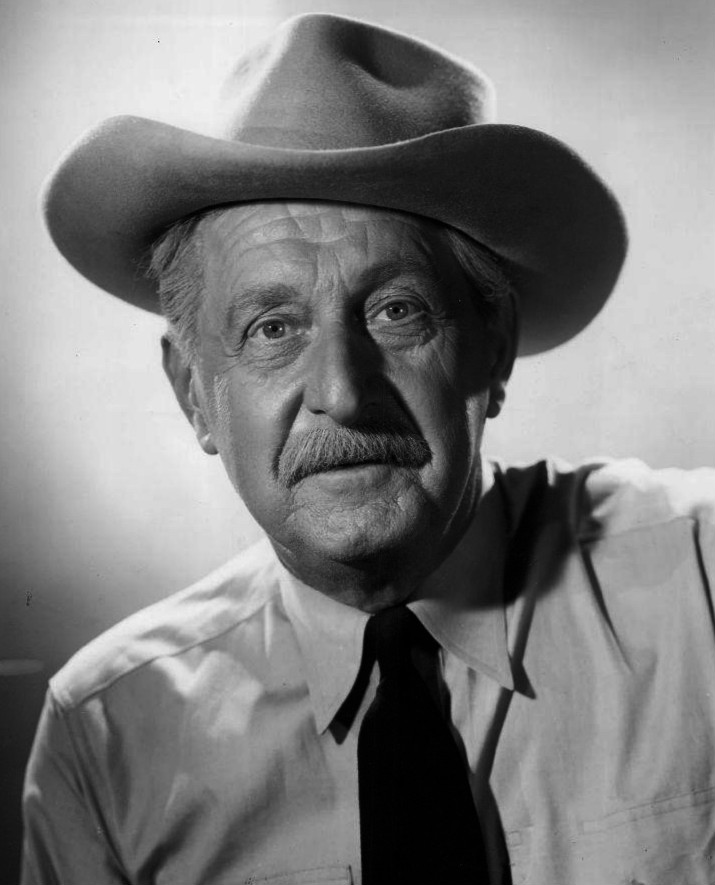
Stanley Andrews as "The Old Ranger", first host of Death Valley Days

Each of the 452 television episodes was introduced by a host. The longest running was "The Old Ranger," a character played by veteran actor Stanley Andrews from 1952 to 1964.

Following the departure of Andrews, all subsequent hosts appeared under their own names, starting with Ronald Reagan, the former host of CBS's General Electric Theater. Reagan appeared in 21 episodes of Death Valley Days, including the 1965 segment "A City Is Born" in which he played mining developer Charles Poston, the "Father of Arizona".

When Reagan left to run for governor of California, he was succeeded by Robert Taylor. Like Reagan, Taylor appeared as a character in some of the shows, including "The Day All Marriages Were Cancelled" (1966), also based on the career of Charles Poston. He portrayed Horace Bell in another 1967 episode, "Major Horace Bell." That same year in the episode "Shanghai Kelly's Birthday Party," Taylor played James Kelly of San Francisco. After playing Porter Stockton in another 1967 episode "Halo for a Badman", he would portray Texas John Slaughter, in the 1968 episode "A Short Cut through Tombstone".

Taylor became gravely ill in 1969, and after 69 episodes was succeeded by Dale Robertson, former star of two other Western series, Tales of Wells Fargo and Iron Horse. Robertson served as host and occasional actor for 23 episodes until production of new episodes ceased in 1970. In 1975, the show briefly returned in reruns, with singer Merle Haggard providing narration for some previously produced episodes.

The commercial spokesperson for the show was Rosemary DeCamp. When the show began in 1952, Dorothy McCann gave DeCamp a long-term contract to have DeCamp and her daughters appear in the commercials. She also appeared in four episodes.

While the series followed the anthology format, with all new stories and characters in each episode, the series utilized many character actors over its 18-year run. Some, (such as Don Haggerty, John Pickard, Gregg Barton, Michael Vallon, James Seay, Guy Wilkerson and Roy Engel) appeared in multiple episodes over the entire run of the series.

== Episodes ==
Season	Episodes	Originally released		Black & White / Color
Season	Episodes	First released	Last released	Black & White / Color
1	18	October 1, 1952	May 26, 1953	Black & White
2	18	September 29, 1953	June 17, 1954	Black & White
3	18	September 24, 1954	June 7, 1955	Black & White
4	21	1955	1956	Black & White
5	17	1956	1957	Black & White
6	25	1957	1958	Black & White
7	33	1958	1959	Black & White
8	38	1959	1960	Black & White
9	30	1960	1961	Black & White
10	26	1961	1962	Black & White
11	26	1962	1963	23 B&W, 3 Color
12	26	1963	1964	16 B&W, 10 Color
13	26	1964	1965	Color
14	26	1965	1966	Color
15	26	1966	1967	Color
16	26	1967	1968	Color
17	26	1968	1969	Color
18	26	October 2, 1969	April 24, 1970	Color
Total	452	October 1, 1952	April 24, 1970	283 B&W, 169 Color

== Background and production ==
=== Development ===
In 1930, the Pacific Coast Borax Company was looking for ways to market their products, including 20 Mule Team Borax. Working with their New York advertising agency, McCann-Erickson, they settled on creating a radio program to highlight Death Valley, the obscure location of much of the company's borax mining operations. McCann copywriter Ruth Woodman, who had experience with radio copywriting, was selected to write the show. As a long-time New Yorker, Woodman had never been to Death Valley and the initial story of the discovery of borax was written entirely from reference books. Woodman eventually decided to visit Death Valley, and eventually made several trips there to research story material for the show, which eventually became a radio hit.

In 1945, the radio show was dropped in favor of other material, but after nearly eight years, the show was re-developed for television as the Pacific Coast Borax Company sought to develop material for the new medium. Originally, McCann was interested in one minute advertising spots on television, but found so few available that full program sponsorship was more feasible. With more than 750 scripts from 14 years of radio programs, they already had the content to adapt.

For its first two years, the series was produced by Gene Autry's Flying A Productions. In 1954, Dorrell and Stuart McGowan left Autry's Flying A to form McGowan Productions, bringing Death Valley Days along with them. Filmaster Productions, Inc., which produced the first several seasons of Gunsmoke, Have Gun – Will Travel, and Playhouse 90 for CBS Television, took over production of the series in 1959, specifically noting that production company president Robert Stabler had a reputation for producing shows on-time and under budget. Production was later handled by Madison Productions.

=== Writing ===
Ruth Woodman had previously researched and written all of the scripts for the show's radio run. When the show was re-worked for television, she continued to write all scripts for the first five years of production, at which time she became the show's story editor. The series required historical accuracy for its stories, breaking out of the standard Western genre plotlines, instead focusing on actual pioneer events.

=== Casting ===
As an anthology, the cast changed with each episode. When Filmaster took over production in 1959, one of their immediate changes was to use bigger name Hollywood actors.

=== Filming ===
Although parts of the series were filmed in Kanab, Utah and Apacheland Studio in Arizona, the series was primarily filmed in Death Valley National Park, Segments were done on location, and shot on short, three-day schedules. Filming would take place approximately six times per year, and while on location, the cast and crew would stay at the Pacific Coast Borax Company's Death Valley resort, the Furnace Creek Inn. Host segments for the final cut were filmed in studio.

Under the production of Filmaster, the production schedule was to complete two half-hour episodes per week, with final cut host segments shot at Producers Studios in Hollywood.

=== Ownership ===
Under the Death Valley Days title, the program was sponsored by the Pacific Coast Borax Company, which during the program's run changed its name to U.S. Borax Company following a merger. The "20-Mule Team Borax" consumer products division of U.S. Borax was eventually bought out by the Dial Corporation, which as of 2014, as a division of the German consumer products concern Henkel, still manufactures and markets them. Rio Tinto Group absorbed the U.S. Borax mining operations in 1968 and now owns the TV series.

Although Rio Tinto still has a financial stake in this show because copyrights are still held by U.S. Borax, the major rights are now held by Element 5 Media, LLC for the broadcast rights and home video rights.

=== Restoration ===
Paul Korver's company Cinelicious in Hollywood was part of the restoration of the TV series Death Valley Days, restoring 458 half-hour film episodes. Cinelicious worked with U.S. Borax Film Archives and Rio Tinto Group in preserving the TV series. The 16mm, and 35 mm film of Death Valley Days was scanned at 4K resolution for film preservation on a Scanity starting in 2013.

== Release ==
=== Broadcast ===
Beginning in 1952, the series began by using unconventional methods. First, the show was syndicated to local markets rather than released nationally. Second, they aired new programs every other week, rather than weekly. At the time, the conventional approach was exactly the opposite - national release on a weekly schedule in order to achieve a consistent audience. However, McCann-Erickson felt that the previous popularity of the radio program would overcome those obstacles, a theory that was proven in their first season of high Nielsen ratings.

McCann achieved success marketing the show directly to local stations, starting with 64 in the first season, expanding to 73 in the second, their only general difficulty being one and two-station markets.

=== Rebroadcasts ===
During the latter years of the series, some new episodes were still being made while older episodes were already in syndication. In some markets, new episodes could even be running in competition with older ones. To make it easier for viewers to distinguish between old and new, some blocks of syndicated Death Valley Days episodes were shown under other series names and with different hosts. This was common practice at the time among syndicated series because it was easy to reshoot the hosting portions of an episode without affecting the main content.

Some of these episodes were re-run with different sponsorship under the title The Pioneers with host Will Rogers, Jr. Similar rebroadcasts were done under the names Call of the West hosted by John Payne, Frontier Adventure hosted by Dale Robertson, Trails West hosted by Ray Milland, and Western Star Theatre hosted by Rory Calhoun. Little had to be changed other than the 20 mule team and the bugle call.

The restored TV series continues to be rebroadcast on channels such as the Encore Westerns Channel and GRIT.

=== Home media ===
Shout! Factory (on behalf of Element 5 Media LLC and Rio Tinto), has released the first two seasons on DVD in Region 1. Both seasons were released as Walmart exclusives. The third season was released on March 21, 2017 The thirteenth season was released on July 31, 2017, as a Walmart exclusive. Then, on Tuesday, October 3, 2017, the title "went wide" with a general retail release. The fourteenth season was released on January 2, 2018.

DVD name	Ep #	Release date
The Complete First Season	18	March 29, 2016
The Complete Second Season	18	July 12, 2016
The Complete Third Season	18	March 21, 2017
The Complete Thirteenth Season	26	October 3, 2017
The Complete Fourteenth Season	26	January 2, 2018

== Reception ==
Starting from the first season of the television series, McCann-Erickson noted that they saw a rise in sales of 20 Mule Team Borax. They also noted an increase in visitors to the Furnace Creek Inn, a Death Valley resort owned by show sponsor Pacific Coast Borax.

=== Awards and nominations ===
Year	Award	Category	Recipient	Result
1953	Billboard TV Film Show Awards	Best Western TV Film Program	Death Valley Days	Won
1953	Freedoms Foundation		Ruth Woodman (for episode "The Land of the Free")	Won
1955	Emmy Award	Best Western or Adventure Series	Death Valley Days	Nominated
1961	Western Heritage Awards	Best Factual Television Program	Ruth Woodman and Nat Perrin (For episode "The Great Lounsberry Scoop")	Won

== See also ==
- Born in East L.A. (song), for which the show is a plot point.
