= Glenhall Taylor =

Glenhall Taylor (1903–1997) was an American writer, producer, and director for radio and television. The majority of his career was as a writer of radio programs, including Burns and Allen, Ozzie and Harriet, and Blondie.

Taylor made his radio debut on KZY on May 11, 1922, where he shared the microphone with Stanford University's first president, David Starr Jordan.

Taylor also wrote a history of "radio's heyday", titled Before Television: The Radio Years (1979).
