= List of Warner Bros. films (1960–1969) =

The following films were produced, co-produced, and/or distributed by Warner Bros. Pictures, Inc. and its successor Warner Bros.–Seven Arts in the 1960s.

== 1960 ==
Release date	Title	Notes
January 2, 1960	Ice Palace	
January 27, 1960	Cash McCall	
February 1, 1960	Guns of the Timberland	co-production with Jaguar Productions
February 3, 1960	The Rise and Fall of Legs Diamond	co-production with United States Pictures
February 24, 1960	The Bramble Bush	co-production with United States Pictures
March 11, 1960	The Threat	co-production with Robin Rae Productions
March 19, 1960	This Rebel Breed	theatrical distribution only
March 21, 1960	The Cranes Are Flying	Russian film; US theatrical distribution only; produced by Mosfilm
April 6, 1960	Tall Story	
May 18, 1960	Sergeant Rutledge	co-production with John Ford Productions
June 18, 1960	Hannibal	distribution only; produced Liber Films
July 13, 1960	Hercules Unchained	distribution only
August 10, 1960	Ocean's 11	co-production with Dorchester Productions
September 2, 1960	The Crowded Sky	
September 28, 1960	Sunrise at Campobello	
October 8, 1960	The Dark at the Top of the Stairs	
November 11, 1960	Girl of the Night	
December 8, 1960	The Sundowners	

== 1961 ==
Release date	Title	Notes
January 28, 1961	A Fever in the Blood	
February 18, 1961	Gold of the Seven Saints	
April 2, 1961	The Sins of Rachel Cade	
April 19, 1961	Portrait of a Mobster	
May 4, 1961	Parrish	
May 12, 1961	Odd Obsession	Japanese film; distribution only
June 28, 1961	Fanny (Note: Owned by Westchester Films)	distribution only; produced by Mansfield Productions
June 28, 1961	The Fabulous World of Jules Verne	Czech film; US theatrical distribution only
September 20, 1961	The Steel Claw	theatrical distribution only This film is now in the public domain
September 20, 1961	Claudelle Inglish	
October 10, 1961	Splendor in the Grass	co-production with Newtown Productions
November 1, 1961	The Mask	theatrical distribution only
November 8, 1961	Susan Slade	
December 27, 1961	A Majority of One	
December 28, 1961	The Roman Spring of Mrs. Stone	British film co-production with Louis De Rochemont Associates and Seven Arts Productions

== 1962 ==
Release date	Title	Notes
February 21, 1962	The Couch	
April 11, 1962	Samar	distribution only
April 11, 1962	House of Women	co-production with Bryan Foy Productions
April 12, 1962	Rome Adventure	
May 2, 1962	The Singer Not the Song (Note: Owned by ITV Studios)	distribution only; produced by The Rank Organisation
June 2, 1962	Lad, A Dog	co-production with Vanguard Productions
June 13, 1962	Merrill's Marauders	
June 19, 1962	The Music Man	Inducted into the National Film Registry in 2005
August 17, 1962	Guns of Darkness	British film distribution only; produced by Associated British Pictures Corporation and Cavalcade Films
October 5, 1962	The Chapman Report	
October 24, 1962	Gay Purr-ee	co-production with United Productions of America; Warner Bros.’ first animated film
October 31, 1962	What Ever Happened to Baby Jane?	Inducted into the National Film Registry in 2021 distribution only; produced by Seven Arts Productions
November 1, 1962	Gypsy	
November 6, 1962	The Story of the Count of Monte Cristo	US distribution only
December 21, 1962	Malaga	distribution only; produced by Cavalcade Films Limited
December 26, 1962	Days of Wine and Roses	Inducted into the National Film Registry in 2018 co-production with Jalem Productions

== 1963 ==
Release date	Title	Notes
January 30, 1963	Term of Trial	British film distribution only; produced by Romulus Films
April 11, 1963	Black Gold	
April 13, 1963	Critic's Choice	
May 16, 1963	Spencer's Mountain	
June 12, 1963	Island of Love	
June 19, 1963	PT-109	
September 4, 1963	Wall of Noise	
September 6, 1963	The Castilian	US distribution only
October 9, 1963	Rampage	distribution only; produced by Seven Arts Productions
October 24, 1963	Mary, Mary	
November 5, 1963	Palm Springs Weekend	
December 15, 1963	America America	Inducted into the National Film Registry in 2001
December 18, 1963	The Man from Galveston	television pilot for Temple Houston
December 25, 1963	4 for Texas	co-production with The Sam Company
December 26, 1963	Act One	co-production with Dore Schary Productions

== 1964 ==
Release date	Title	Notes
February 14, 1964	Dr. Crippen (Note: Owned by StudioCanal)	British film distribution only
February 19, 1964	Dead Ringer	
March 28, 1964	The Incredible Mr. Limpet	Co-produced by Warner Bros. Cartoons
April 8, 1964	FBI Code 98	
May 30, 1964	A Distant Trumpet	
June 24, 1964	Robin and the 7 Hoods	co-production with P-C Productions
June 30, 1964	Last Plane to Baalbeck	Italian-French film US distribution only
July 31, 1964	Ensign Pulver	
August 21, 1964	Kisses for My President	co-production with Pearlayne
September 23, 1964	Richard Burton's Hamlet	
October 3, 1964	Cheyenne Autumn	
November 4, 1964	Youngblood Hawke	
December 2, 1964	Dear Heart	
December 17, 1964	My Fair Lady (Note: Owned by CBS with Paramount Pictures handling distribution)	Inducted into the National Film Registry in 2018 theatrical distribution only
December 17, 1964	Sex and the Single Girl	

== 1965 ==
Release date	Title	Notes
January 13, 1965	Two on a Guillotine	
February 24, 1965	None but the Brave	co-production with Tokyo Eiga, Toho and Artanis Entertainment
March 24, 1965	My Blood Runs Cold	co-production with William Conrad Productions
May 5, 1965	Brainstorm	
May 26, 1965	The Battle of the Villa Fiorita	British film
June 9, 1965	The Woman Who Wouldn't Die	US distribution only; produced by British Lion Films
July 1, 1965	The Great Race	
August 4, 1965	The Third Day	
August 18, 1965	Catch Us If You Can	U.S. distribution only; produced by Anglo-Amalgamated
September 1, 1965	Murieta	
September 24, 1965	Marriage on the Rocks	co-production with A-C Productions and Sinatra Enterprises
October 20, 1965	La Bohème	German film US distribution only
November 4, 1965	Never Too Late	co-production with Tandem Productions
December 15, 1965	Othello	British film US distribution only
December 16, 1965	Battle of the Bulge	co-production with Cinerama Productions and United States Pictures
December 22, 1965	Inside Daisy Clover	

== 1966 ==
Release date	Title	Notes
February 23, 1966	Harper	
May 11, 1966	Stop the World - I Want to Get Off	
June 8, 1966	A Big Hand for the Little Lady	co-production with Eden Productions Inc.
June 22, 1966	Who's Afraid of Virginia Woolf?	Inducted into the National Film Registry in 2013
June 29, 1966	A Fine Madness	
August 31, 1966	An American Dream	co-production with William Conrad Productions
September 22, 1966	Kaleidoscope	British film co-production with Winkast Film Productions
October 13, 1966	Any Wednesday	
October 19, 1966	Chamber of Horrors	
November 2, 1966	Not with My Wife, You Don't!	co-production with Fernwood Productions and Reynard Productions
November 16, 1966	The Defector	distribution only; produced by Seven Arts Productions
December 2, 1966	Once Before I Die	distribution only; produced by Seven Arts Productions
December 9, 1966	You're a Big Boy Now	distribution only; produced by Seven Arts Productions

== 1967 ==
Release date	Title	Notes
January 19, 1967	Hotel	
January 25, 1967	First to Fight	
February 3, 1967	The Corrupt Ones	US & UK distribution only; produced by CCC Film
February 15, 1967	A Covenant with Death	co-production with William Conrad Productions
March 15, 1967	The Mikado	British film US distribution only
April 12, 1967	The Cool Ones	
May 10, 1967	The Viscount	Italian-Spanish film US distribution only
June 28, 1967	The Family Way	British film US distribution only; produced by British Lion Films
June 28, 1967	Up the Down Staircase	
July 19, 1967	Triple Cross	British-French film US distribution only
July 19, 1967	The Naked Runner	British film
August 13, 1967	Bonnie and Clyde	Inducted into the National Film Registry in 1992
September 28, 1967	The Bobo	British film
October 13, 1967	Reflections in a Golden Eye	
October 25, 1967	Camelot	
October 26, 1967	Wait Until Dark	
November 1, 1967	Cool Hand Luke	Inducted into the National Film Registry in 2005 co-production with Jalem Productions
November 15, 1967	It!	British film co-production with Gold Star Films Ltd.
November 15, 1967	The Frozen Dead	British film co-production with Gold Star Films Ltd.

== 1968 ==
Release date	Title	Notes
January 20, 1968	The Vengeance of Fu Manchu	British film US distribution only
January 24, 1968	Firecreek	
February 1, 1968	Flaming Frontier	German film US distribution only
February 2, 1968	Countdown	
February 7, 1968	The Fox	co-distribution with Claridge Pictures
February 8, 1968	Sweet November	
February 16, 1968	The Shuttered Room	British film co-production with Troy-Schenck Productions
February 21, 1968	Bye Bye Braverman	
April 11, 1968	The Young Girls of Rochefort	French film US distribution only
May 1, 1968	Kona Coast	co-production with Pioneer Productions
May 1, 1968	The Double Man	co-production with Albion Film Corp.
June 8, 1968	Chubasco	co-production with William Conrad Productions
June 10, 1968	Petulia	
July 3, 1968	The Devil in Love	Italian film US distribution only
July 4, 1968	The Green Berets	co-production with Batjac Productions
July 31, 1968	The Heart Is a Lonely Hunter	
August 26, 1968	Rachel, Rachel	co-production with Kayos Productions
September 20, 1968	Heidi	Austrian film US distribution only
September 29, 1968	Hugo and Josephine	Swedish film US distribution only
October 9, 1968	Finian's Rainbow	
October 17, 1968	Bullitt	Inducted into the National Film Registry in 2007 co-production with Solar Productions
October 18, 1968	I Love You, Alice B. Toklas!	
October 30, 1968	The Bastard	Italian film
December 22, 1968	Assignment to Kill	co-production with William Conrad Productions
December 23, 1968	The Sea Gull	co-production with Sidney Lumet Productions
December 25, 1968	The Sergeant	

== 1969 ==
Release date	Title	Notes
January 12, 1969	Great Catherine	British film co-production with Keep Films
February 5, 1969	They Came to Rob Las Vegas	US & Spain distribution only
February 6, 1969	Dracula Has Risen from the Grave	British film co-production with Hammer Films
March 5, 1969	The Trygon Factor	British-German film US distribution only
March 5, 1969	The Big Bounce	
March 11, 1969	2000 Years Later	
March 26, 1969	The Illustrated Man	
April 25, 1969	The Sweet Body of Deborah	Italian-French film US distribution only
April 30, 1969	The Big Cube	
July 18, 1969	The Wild Bunch	Inducted into the National Film Registry in 1999
August 6, 1969	The Learning Tree	Inducted into the National Film Registry in 1989
August 8, 1969	The Picasso Summer	
August 27, 1969	The Rain People	co-production with American Zoetrope
September 3, 1969	The Valley of Gwangi	co-production with Charles H. Schneer Productions
September 10, 1969	The Great Bank Robbery	
October 10, 1969	The Good Guys and the Bad Guys	
October 12, 1969	The Madwoman of Chaillot	co-production with Commonwealth United Entertainment
November 12, 1969	Once You Kiss a Stranger	
November 18, 1969	The Arrangement	
December 18, 1969	The Damned	
December 19, 1969	80 Steps to Jonah	

== See also ==
- List of New Line Cinema films
- List of films based on DC Comics publications
- List of Warner Bros. theatrical animated feature films
- Category:Lists of films by studio
