= Larry Ward (actor) =

American actor (1924-1985)

- Born: October 3, 1924; Columbus, Ohio, U.S.
- Died: February 16, 1985 (aged 60); Los Angeles, California, U.S.
- Other name: Ward Gaynor
- Occupation: Actor
- Years active: 1954-1982
- Spouse: Roberta Haynes

Larry McCormick Ward (October 3, 1924 – February 16, 1985) was an American actor who appeared in many films and television series. He was sometimes credited under the name Ward Gaynor.

== Biography ==
Ward was born in Columbus, Ohio on October 3, 1924. His father was Grant P. Ward (1888–1941), a former college football coach and a member of the Ohio State Senate. Ward studied at Ohio University and Denison University before joining the United States Navy, where he served for three years.

Enrolling in the American Theatre Wing under the G.I. Bill of Rights, Ward soon appeared in several outstanding productions. He turned his talents to writing but also kept his hand in the acting profession by appearing in a television soap opera titled The Brighter Day in 1954. Here he played a character called Dr. Randy Hamilton, but Ward had his sights set on Hollywood and left the show in 1957 when his character died of a myocardial infarction.

Ward got his break in 1962 while he was visiting the Warner Brothers studio to discuss a film script with producer Jules Schermer, who was so impressed with his appearance that he gave him a minor part as Blake Stevens in the episode "The Holdout" of the western series Lawman, starring John Russell and Peter Brown, which was filming the following morning during its last season on the air. This break was followed by minor roles in other TV series, and in 1963 Schermer gave Ward the starring role of U.S. Marshal Frank Ragan in a new western series called The Dakotas, which also featured Chad Everett, Mike Greene, and Jack Elam as Ward's deputies. The series was suddenly canceled after a public outcry over the nineteenth episode, in which a priest was injured during a gunfight at a church.

In the 1966–1967 season, Ward guest starred on the NBC series The Road West in the episode entitled "Shaman". In 1966, he appeared as a guest star on season 1 of Lost in Space, in the episode "All That Glitters" with Werner Klemplerer from "Hogan's Heroes".

In 1976, Ward appeared in an episode of the CBS western series Sara. His last on-screen appearances were on two episodes in 1982 of CBS's M*A*S*H.

Ward died at the age of 60 in Los Angeles, California, in 1985.

== Filmography ==
=== Film ===
- A Distant Trumpet (1964) - Sgt. Kroger
- Hombre (1967) - Soldier
- Kill the Wicked! (1967) - Benny Hudson
- Non sta bene rubare il tesoro (1967) - Bill
- Sapevano solo uccidere (1968) - Saguaro
- Five for Hell (1969) - Thompson (English version, voice, uncredited)
- Macabre (1969) - Peter and John
- Naked Violence (1969) - Sampero (English version, voice, uncredited)
- Blackie the Pirate (1971) - Blackie (English version, voice, uncredited)
- A Bay of Blood (1971) - Simon (English version, voice, uncredited)
- Caliber 9 (1972) - Fonzino and Masucci (English version, voice, uncredited)
- The Deathhead Virgin (1974) - Frank Cutter
- Mister Scarface (1976) - (English version, voice)

=== Television ===
- Have Gun Will Travel (1962) - S6/E7: "Memories of Monica" as Monica's (Judi Meredith) ex-boyfriend who is released from prison and is determined to take her away from her husband, the sheriff (Bing Russell).
- The Outer Limits (1964) – S2/E14: "Counterweight" as Keith Ellis
- Gunsmoke (1965) - "The New Society" as Sid Pierce
- Lost in Space (1965) – "All That Glitters" as Ohan
- The Fugitive (1965) - S3/E15: "When The Wind Blows" as Steve Jackson
- The Time Tunnel (1966) – "One Way To the Moon" as Colonel Kane
- The Invaders (1967) - "The Condemned" as Detective Carter
- Land of the Giants (1969) – "Shell Game" as Talf Ekorb
- The Virginian (TV series) (1969) season 7 episode 16 (Last grave at socorro creek) : Bill Burden
- The Virginian (TV series) (1970) season 8 épisode 20 (No war for the warrior) : Sheriff Gray
- Sara (1976) – "The Mountain Man" as Joe
- M*A*S*H (1982) - "Where There's a Will, There's a War" as General Kratzer
- M*A*S*H (1982) - "The Moon Is Not Blue" as General Rothaker (final appearance)
