= Diane McBain =

American actress (1941–2022)

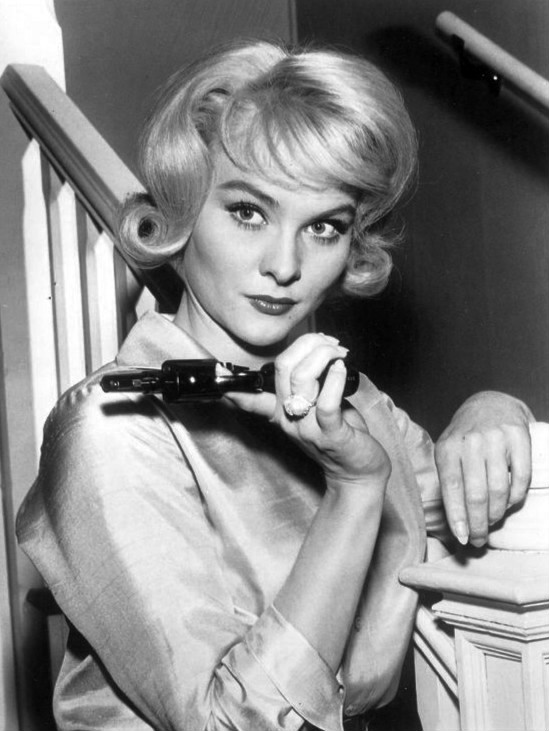
- McBain as Daphne Dutton, 1962
- Born: Diane Jean McBain; May 18, 1941; Cleveland, Ohio, U.S.
- Died: December 21, 2022 (aged 81); Los Angeles, California, U.S.
- Education: Glendale High School
- Occupation: Actress
- Years active: 1959–2001
- Known for: Surfside 6 Spinout; Batman
- Spouse: Rodney L. Burke (m. 1972; div. 1974)
- Children: 1

Diane Jean McBain (May 18, 1941 – December 21, 2022) was an American actress who, as a Warner Brothers contract player, reached a brief peak of popularity during the early 1960s. She was best known for playing an adventurous socialite in the 1960–1962 television series Surfside 6 and as one of Elvis Presley's leading ladies in 1966's Spinout.

== Early life ==
McBain was born on May 18, 1941, in Cleveland, Ohio. She moved to the Los Angeles area at an early age and began her showbusiness career as an adolescent model in print and television advertisements.

During her senior year at Glendale High School, while appearing in a play, she was spotted by a Warner Bros. talent scout and added to the studio's roster of contract performers. She signed a seven-year contract with Warners on her 18th birthday.

== Career ==
McBain made her television acting debut in 1959 in two episodes of Maverick, March 8 with Jack Kelly and November 22, with James Garner, as well as the October 16 episode of 77 Sunset Strip. Her first director, at the helm of the March 8 installment, "Passage to Fort Doom", was veteran actor Paul Henreid.

Having received a positive reaction to McBain's initial performances, the studio realized it had a potential star under contract. She was given a prominent ingenue role in her first feature, the $3.5 million Ice Palace (1960) alongside Richard Burton and Robert Ryan. The filmed-on-location Technicolor epic was released on January 2, 1960, to mixed reviews, but McBain's notices were generally favorable.

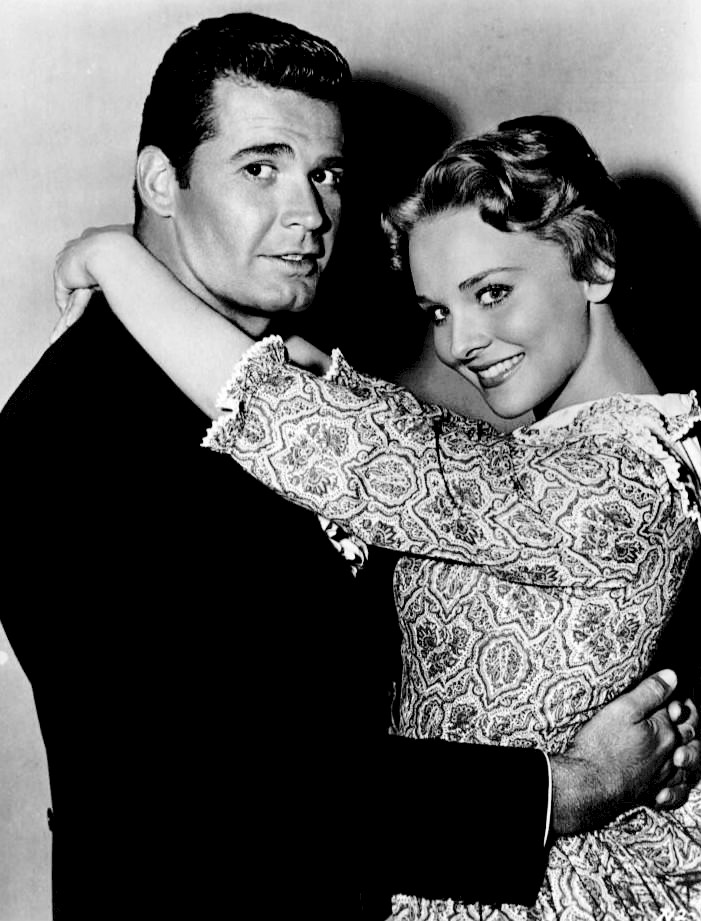
With James Garner in Maverick (1960)

Warner Bros. Television continued to keep McBain busy during 1960 with numerous appearances on its TV shows. She returned to 77 Sunset Strip on February 26, then nine days later found herself in Alaska with a guest role in the March 6 installment of The Alaskans, starring Roger Moore. Eight days later, she was in Bourbon Street Beat and the following day on Sugarfoot. Another episode of Bourbon Street Beat followed two weeks later on March 28, and still another 77 Sunset Strip on May 6. In eight more days, she was in an episode of Lawman, and three weeks thereafter, on June 6, a third episode of Bourbon Street Beat in as many months. On March 1 and 2, 1967, during the second season of the ABC series Batman, she played socialite Pinkie Pinkston, a friend of Batman's alias Bruce Wayne.

Warners gave McBain a regular role on Surfside 6 (1960–62), supporting Troy Donahue, Van Williams, and Lee Patterson. Surfside 6 ran for two seasons.

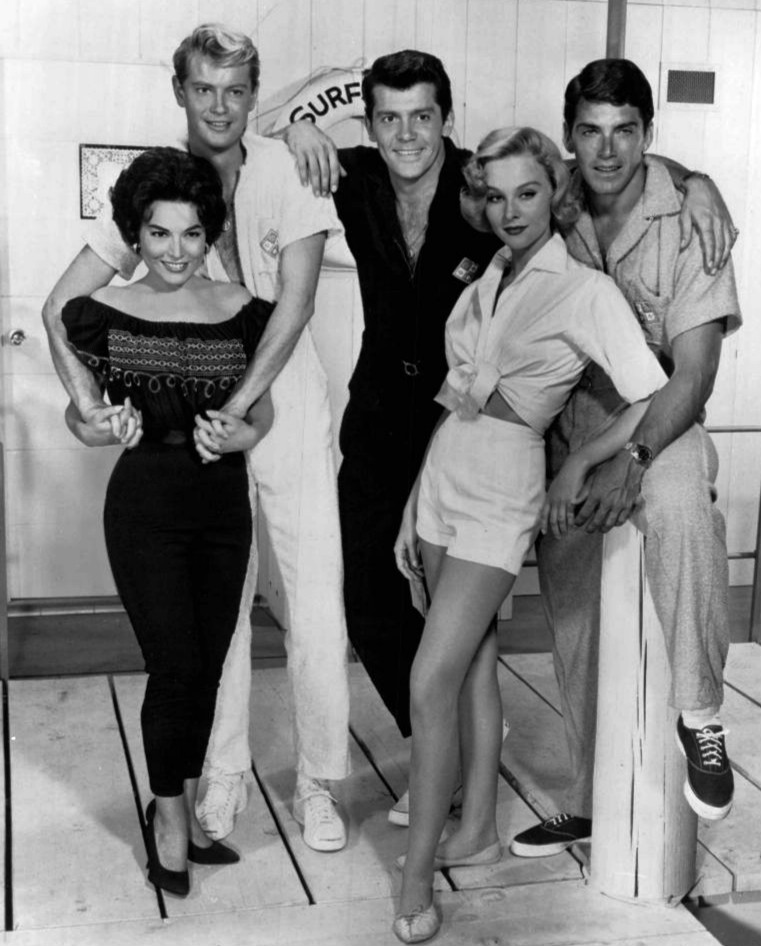
Surfside 6 cast: Margarita Sierra, Troy Donohue, Lee Patterson, Diane McBain and Van Williams

McBain had a banner year in 1960. In addition to appearing in a top feature film and guest-starring in eight TV episodes, she was assigned two more theatrical features. The first offered her one of three ingenue roles in a major "A" film, Parrish (1961), supporting Troy Donahue; the others were Connie Stevens and Sharon Hugueny. The film was a hit and made over $4 million.

Warners then gave McBain the star part in her own "B"-film vehicle, Claudelle Inglish (1961) when she replaced the original choice for the lead, Anne Francis, in the title role. It was based on a novel by Erskine Caldwell.

Warners gave her another lead role in a feature, Black Gold (1962). She returned to guest starring on shows like Hawaii Five-O.

Producer Hall Bartlett borrowed McBain for a role in The Caretakers (1963) with Polly Bergen and Joan Crawford.

When 77 Sunset Strip kicked off its sixth and final season in 1963 with a special five-part story called 'Five', McBain played opposite Efrem Zimbalist, Jr. as "Carla Stevens".

She then supported Debbie Reynolds in Mary, Mary (1963). Her last film for Warners was A Distant Trumpet (1964) with Donahue and Suzanne Pleshette, the final film of director Raoul Walsh. In a 1964 interview she said she had "mostly been cast as the spoilt rich girl".

Warners announced her for Sex and the Single Girl (1964) in the role of a secretary. She turned down the role and Warners elected not to renew her contract.

McBain guest-starred in Arrest and Trial, Wendy and Me, Kraft Suspense Theatre, Bob Hope Presents the Chrysler Theatre, Burke's Law (a number of times), The Wild Wild West, The Man from UNCLE, and Vacation Playhouse.

She was announced for the films Spring Is for Crying and Halcyon Years but neither was made. She made Five from the Hawk in Spain.

"I was very stupid about money," McBain said later. "My mother had always made my clothes, and I was embarrassed about it. I became a shopaholic and spent a fortune on store-bought clothes. Tammy Bakker probably copied the way I did my shopping and eyelashes."

Work began to dry up. "We were going through a revolution in society with the civil-rights movement and the Vietnam War," she said. "Now, white Anglo-Saxon, pretty people were low on the totem pole. We were thought to be on the other side, conservatives who were the cause of the war and the civil-rights problem. Dustin Hoffman, yes. Troy Donahue, no. Nobody wanted beautiful people on the screen. They wanted people like them, average. I didn't get much work."

In August 1965 McBain's parents reported her as missing. It turned out she had checked herself into a hotel in San Diego under the name "Marilyn Miller" for "a change of faces, scenery and attitudes... I just wanted to be Miss Nobody from Nowhere." She said she had been despondent over a slackening income and not getting the type of roles she wanted.

She was Elvis Presley's leading lady in Spinout (1966) alongside Shelley Fabares and Deborah Walley, and later that year she guest-starred on Batman.

McBain made two films with Fabian Forte at American International Pictures, Thunder Alley (1967), directed by Richard Rush, and Maryjane (1968), directed by Maury Dexter. Dexter then put McBain in the lead of AIP's The Mini-Skirt Mob (1968), a hit at the box office.

McBain supported Gardner McKay in I Sailed to Tahiti with an All Girl Crew (1968) and went to Crown International Pictures for Five the Hard Way (1969) aka The Sidehackers. She toured Vietnam in 1968 with Tippi Hedren and Joey Bishop.

During the 1970s, McBain slowed her career somewhat to care for her son Evan, though she continued to make guest appearances in a number of television series. "I never really cared about superstardom, I only cared about the roles that were available to those who were superstars," she later said. "I was motivated to continue on in the face of total failure because I had a child to rear on my own with little help from his father. Acting was the best way for me to make money and the best way for me to be a more present mom in my son's life. Full-time jobs brought in money but kept me away from the day-to-day life of my child."

McBain guest-starred on Love, American Style, Mannix, To Rome with Love, Land of the Giants, and Mod Squad.

She had roles in the features The Delta Factor (1970), The Wild Season (1971), Huyendo del halcón (1973), Wicked, Wicked (1973), and The Deathhead Virgin (1974), which she later called "the stupidest screenplay I ever had to work with."

McBain also guested on the TV series The Wide World of Mystery, Police Story, Barbary Coast, and Marcus Welby, M.D..

Towards the end of the 1970s and in the early 1980s McBain was in Donner Pass: The Road to Survival (1978), The Life and Times of Grizzly Adams, Hawaii Five-O, Charlie's Angels, Eight Is Enough, Days of Our Lives, Dallas, Matt Houston, Airwolf, The Red Fury, Crazy Like a Fox, and Knight Rider. She also worked steadily in regional theatre.

McBain appeared in Jake and the Fatman, Puppet Master 5 (1994), Sabrina, the Teenage Witch, Dr. Quinn, Medicine Woman, Invisible Mom II, The Young and the Restless, The Broken Hearts Club: A Romantic Comedy (2000), Besotted (2001), and Strong Medicine.

She was in a TV movie, Cab to Canada (1998), which she said "was enough to make me never want to act again".

In 1990 she was seeking financing for her screenplay The Spilling Moon about the first woman to trek along the Colorado River through the Grand Canyon.

== Personal life ==
In early 1968 McBain visited U.S. troops in Vietnam on a Johnny Grant tour with fellow actress Melody Patterson. McBain was married to Rodney Burke, whom she met at a Buddhist camp, from 1972 until their 1974 divorce. The couple had one son, Evan.

In 1982, McBain was beaten, robbed, and raped by two men in her garage in West Hollywood at 1:30 am on Christmas Day after she came home from a party. She began a second career as a rape victim counselor. The culprits were never found. "The shock of what happened caused loss of memory, inability to concentrate, and I'm still startled out of proportion," she said in 1990.

== Death ==
McBain died from liver cancer on the morning of December 21, 2022, at the Motion Picture Country Home in Los Angeles, California, where she had lived for a number of years. She was 81.

== Filmography ==
=== Film ===
Year	Film	Role	Notes
1960	Ice Palace	Christine Storm	
1961	Parrish	Alison Post	
1961	Claudelle Inglish	Claudelle Inglish	
1962	Black Gold	Ann Evans	Adventure film
1963	The Caretakers	Alison Horne	Drama film
1963	Mary, Mary	Tiffany Richards	
1964	A Distant Trumpet	Laura Frelief – Quaint's Niece	
1966	Spinout	Diana St. Clair	
1967	Thunder Alley	Annie Blaine	
1968	Maryjane	Elli Holden	
1968	The Mini-Skirt Mob	Shayne	
1969	The Sidehackers	Rita	
1969	I Sailed to Tahiti with an All Girl Crew	Liz Clark	Adventure film
1970	The Delta Factor	Lisa Gordot	
1971	Temporada salvaje	Celia 'Doc' Drew	
1973	Huyendo del halcon		
1973	Wicked, Wicked	Dolores Hamilton	
1974	The Deathhead Virgin	Janice Cutter	Horror film
1981	Legend of the Wild	Jenny	
1984	The Red Fury	Mrs. French	
1994	Puppet Master 5	Attorney	Video
1998	The Christmas Path	Laura	
1999	Invisible Mom II	Mrs. Chandler	Video
2000	The Broken Hearts Club	Josephine	romantic comedy-drama film
2001	Besotted	Mrs. Buell	Romance film

=== Television ===
Year	Title	Role	Notes
1959	Maverick	Charlotte Stanton; Holly Vaughn	Episode: "Passage to Fort Doom"; Episode: "A Fellow's Brother"
1960	The Alaskans	Harriet Pemberton	Episode: "Behind the Moon"
1960	Sugarfoot	Joan Guild	Episode: "Return to Boothill"
1960	Lawman	Lilac Allen	Episode: "The Judge"
1960	Bourbon Street Beat	Ginny Costello; Lorraine Elliott; Christina	Episode: "The Missing Queen"; Episode: "Wall of Silence"; Episode: "Ferry to Algiers"
1960-1962	Surfside 6	Daphne Dutton	45 episodes
1962-1963	Hawaiian Eye	Liz Downing; Charlene 'Charley' Boggs	Episode: "Pursuit of a Lady"; Episode: "Pretty Pigeon"
1959-1963	77 Sunset Strip	Laura Stapley; Paula Harding; Doris Spinner; Nita Maran; Lu-Ann Lynwood; Carla Stevens; Carla Stevens; Carla Stevens; Carla Stevens	Episode: "Six Superior Skirts"; Episode: "The Starlet"; Episode: "Fraternity of Fear"; Episode: "Leap, My Lovely"; Episode: "Nine to Five"; Episode: "5: Part 1"; Episode: "5: Part 2"; Episode: "5: Part 3"; Episode: "5: The Conclusion"
1964	Arrest and Trial	Elyse Binns	Episode: "Tigers Are for Jungles"
1964	Wendy and Me	Linda	Episode: "Molehills to Mountains"
1964	Valentine's Day	Sheila	Episode: "The Hottest Game in Town"
1964	Kraft Suspense Theatre	Mary Jorgenson; Diane Weston	Episode: "My Enemy, this Town"; Episode: "One Tiger to a Hill"
1965	Bob Hope Presents the Chrysler Theatre	Show Girl	Episode: "Double Jeopardy"
1964-1965	Burke's Law	Susan Shaw; Xenobia; Lana De Armand; Cissy Davenport DeWitt	Episode: "Who Killed Marty Kelso?"; Episode: "Who Killed Mr. Cartwheel? Episode: "Who Killed the Tall One in the Middle?"; Episode: "Who Killed Nobody Somehow?"
1965	Vacation Playhouse	Sherry	Episode: "Alec Tate"
1965-1967	The Wild Wild West	Jennifer Wingate; Elaine Dodd	Episode: "The Night of a Thousand Eyes"; Episode: "The Night of the Vicious Valentine"
1966-1967	Batman	Lisa; Lisa; Pinky Pinkston; Pinky Pinkston	Episode: "The Thirteenth Hat"; Episode: "Batman Stands Pat"; Episode: "A Piece of the Action"; Episode: "Batman's Satisfaction"
1965-1967	The Man from U.N.C.L.E.	Joanna Lydecker; Contessa Margo De Fanzini; Contessa Nargi De Fanzini	Episode: "The Deadly Toys Affair"; Episode" "The Five Daughters Affair: Part I"; The Five Daughters Affair: Part II"
1969	Love, American Style	Jill Dougherty (segment: "Love and the Roommate")	Episode: "Love and the Burglar / Love and the Roommate / Love and the Wild Party"
1970	Mannix	Stella Diamond	Episode: "Blind Mirror"
1970	Land of the Giants	Mrs. Evers	Episode: "Panic"
1970	To Rome with Love	Connie	Episode: "To Go Home Again"
1971	The Mod Squad	Melba Norwood	Episode: "Kicks Incorporated"
1974	The Wide World of Mystery	Laura Stone	Episode: "Tight as a Drum"
1974	Police Story	Mrs. Thompson	Episode: "World Full of Hurt"
1975	Barbary Coast	Myra Landis	Episode: "Sauce for the Goose"
1976	Marcus Welby, M.D.	Barra Dean	Episode: "The Highest Mountain"
1978	Donner Pass: The Road to Survival	Margaret Reed	Television film
1978	Once Upon a Starry Night	Jenny	Television film
1978	The Life and Times of Grizzly Adams	Jenny	Episode: "Once Upon a Starry Night"
1980	Hawaii Five-O	Eva Pritchard	Episode: "The Moroville Covenant"
1979-1981	Charlie's Angels	Marian Heston; Penny	Episode: "Disco Angels"; Episode: "Angel on the Line"
1981	Eight Is Enough	Mrs. Hall	Episode: "Yet Another Seven Days in February"
1982	Dallas	Dee Dee Webster	Episode: "Denial"; Episode: "Head of the Family"
1983	Matt Houston	Nurse Marcia Bingham	Episode: "The Rock and the Hard Place"
1982-1984	Days of Our Lives	Foxy Dumdinger	20 episodes
1984	Airwolf	Lylah Santini	Episode: "Sins of the Past"
1985	Crazy Like a Fox		Episode: "Bum Tip"
1985	Knight Rider	Mama Flynn	Episode: "Ten Wheel Trouble"
1988	General Hospital	11 episodes	
1990	Jake and the Fatman	Abigail Stevens	Episode: "I Know That You Know"
1992	The Streets of Beverly Hills	Mayor Sands	Television film
1996	Sabrina, the Teenage Witch	Granny	Episode: "A Halloween Story"
1998	Dr. Quinn, Medicine Woman	Old Woman	Episode: "Point Blank"
1998	Cab to Canada	Katherine's Friend (uncredited)	Television film
1999	The Young and the Restless	Society Matron	1 episode
2001	Strong Medicine	Lovey Carmichael	Episode: "Silent Epidemic"
