= Michael Greene =

American actor (1933–2020)

- Born: Michael Harris Greene; November 4, 1933; San Francisco, California, U.S.
- Died: January 10, 2020 (aged 86); Maui, Hawaii, U.S.
- Occupation: Actor
- Years active: 1961–2017

Michael Harris Greene (November 4, 1933 – January 10, 2020) was an American actor who was active from the 1960s through the 1990s.

== Career ==
Greene was born in San Francisco, California, the son of Gladys (née Pugh) and Harry Greene. Early in his career, Greene was frequently featured in westerns and was credited with over 100 television and film appearances, including the 1962 film This is Not a Test (as Mike Green). In October of 1966, he appeared as the character Nubu in the episode "Space Circus" of the TV series, Lost in Space, as well as a leading role in the 1973 film The Clones. Greene also played Jimmy Hart, William Petersen's ill-fated partner in To Live and Die in L.A.

Greene co-starred as Deputy U.S. Marshal Vance Porter in the short-lived ABC–Warner Brothers western series The Dakotas, where he appeared with Larry Ward, Jack Elam, and Chad Everett. The series was controversially cancelled by ABC after only 19 episodes were aired during 1963.

Greene died in Maui, Hawaii in January 2020, at the age of 86.

== Partial filmography ==
Year	Title	Role	Notes
1961	Wanted Dead or Alive	Sheriff Willis	S3E17 "Bounty on Joss"
1962	This Is Not a Test	Joe Baragi	Credited as Mike Green
1963	Spencer's Mountain	Spencer Brother	
1963	The Dakotas	Deputy U.S. Marshall Vance Porter	19 episodes
1966	Gunsmoke	'Outlaw Holcroft'	S12E2 "Goldstrikers"
1969	Naked Angels	'Mother', Biker Gang Leader	
1972	Play It Again, Sam	First Hoodlum	
1973	The Clones	Dr. Gerald Appleby	
1973	The Harrad Experiment	Yoga Instructor	
1973	Kung Fu	Huntoon	S1E9 "Chains"
1976	Harry and Walter Go to New York	Dan	
1981	The Dukes of Hazzard	Vic	1 episode
1984	Moscow on the Hudson	Texan	
1985	Creator	Guard	Credited as Michael Green
1985	To Live and Die in L.A.	Secret Service Agent Jimmy Hart	
1985	Lost in America	Paul Dunn	
1986	Down and Out in Beverly Hills	Ed 'Big Ed'	
1987	Batteries Not Included	Lacey	
1987	Less than Zero	Robert Wells	
1987	Stranded	Vernon Burdett	
1988	The Night Before	Captain Mitchell	
1988	Moon over Parador	Clint	
1989	Kill Me Again	Lieutenant Hendrix	
1990	Lord of the Flies	Captain Benson	
1991	Eve of Destruction	General Curtis	
1991	Rubin and Ed	Mr. Busta	
1991	For the Boys	Major General Scott	
1993	Undercover Blues	Colonel Kenton	
1993	The Pickle	Misson Control Farmer	
1994	Roadflower	Sheriff Hodes	
1999	Nice Guys Sleep Alone	Willie 'Slick Willie'	
2001	The Day Reagan Was Shot	George Bush	
2017	Permanent	Jerry	
