= The Deathhead Virgin =

- Directed by: Norman Foster
- Written by: Jock Gaynor; Larry Ward
- Produced by: Jock Gaynor; Larry Ward
- Starring: Jock Gaynor; Larry Ward; Diane McBain
- Music by: Richard LaSalle
- Production companies: GWG Productions; Spectrum
- Distributed by: Wargay Corporation
- Release date: October 25, 1974
- Running time: 90 minutes
- Countries: United States; Philippines
- Language: English

The Deathhead Virgin is a 1974 American horror film directed by Norman Foster. It stars Jock Gaynor and Larry Ward (both of whom also produced the film and wrote the story and screenplay), as well as Diane McBain (who later called it "the stupidest screenplay I ever had to work with").

== Cast ==
- Jock Gaynor as Larry Alden
- Larry Ward as Frank Cutter
- Diane McBain as Janice Cutter
- Vic Diaz as Mr. Capunan
- Kim Ramos as Moro Princess
- Manny Ojeda as Sebastian
- Iraida Arambulo as Maria
- Butz Aquino as Prof. Villarta
- Laurice Guillen
