= Gregory Walcott =

American actor (1928–2015)

- Walcott in 87th Precinct, 1961
- Born: Bernard Wasdon Mattox; January 13, 1928; Wendell, North Carolina, U.S.
- Died: March 20, 2015 (aged 87); Canoga Park, Los Angeles, California, U.S.
- Other name: Greg Walcott
- Occupation: Actor
- Years active: 1952–1994
- Spouse: Barbara May Watkins (m. 1954; died 2010)
- Children: 3

Gregory Walcott (born Bernard Wasdon Mattox, January 13, 1928 – March 20, 2015) was an American film and television actor. Although he appeared in over 100 films and television series, he is perhaps best known for his leading role in the 1957 film Plan 9 from Outer Space, directed by Ed Wood. He also starred as Det. Roger Havilland on the 1960s police procedural series 87th Precinct, and appeared in several films starring his real-life friend Clint Eastwood.

== Early years ==
Walcott was born Bernard Wasdon Mattox in Wendell, North Carolina, on January 13, 1928. He was raised in Wilson, North Carolina. Walcott served in the United States Army towards the end of World War II and the Korean War.

== Career ==
While serving in the United States Army, Walcott appeared as a marine corps drill instructor in the film Battle Cry (1955), then as a shore patrolman in 1955's war-themed classic Mister Roberts, again as a marine corps drill instructor in The Outsider (1961), and later in Midway (1976) as Capt. Elliott Buckmaster.

He appeared in Western films, beginning with an uncredited role in Red Skies of Montana (1952), then later more prominently as a gunslinger who tries to romance Claudette Colbert in 1955's Texas Lady. He agreed to appear in Plan 9 from Outer Space as a favor to a friend who was financing the film.

Walcott had roles in many television series, including that of Stone Kenyon in two episodes of the NBC sitcom, The People's Choice with Jackie Cooper. He was frequently cast in westerns like Bonanza (seven times), Maverick, Frontier Doctor, Wagon Train, The High Chaparral, 26 Men, Sugarfoot (in the 1958 episode "Bullet Proof"), Laramie, The Rifleman, The Tall Man, The Dakotas, and in several episodes of CBS's Rawhide, through which he began a long collaboration with Clint Eastwood. Walcott had featured roles in Eastwood's films Joe Kidd (1972), Thunderbolt and Lightfoot (1974), The Eiger Sanction (1975), and Every Which Way but Loose (1978).

Walcott made a guest appearance on Perry Mason as Bill Johnson in the 1959 episode, "The Case of the Howling Dog." He also was one of the stars of a 1961–1962 NBC television series, 87th Precinct, as Detective Roger Havilland. Walcott had guest roles on other television series, such as CHiPs and CBS's Dennis the Menace. He had recurring roles too in the original Dallas and Murder, She Wrote, and he appeared as Captain Diggs on the 1970s series Land of the Lost. He also made a guest appearance in 1984 on the TV series Alice in the episode titled "House Full of Hunnicutts". He played Jolene Hunnicutt's father, Big Jake Hunnicutt.

His theatrical film work included the comedy On the Double (1961), Captain Newman, M.D. (1963), Prime Cut (1972), The Last American Hero (1973), and the chase film The Sugarland Express (1974). Walcott played a sheriff in the 1979 film Norma Rae, and appeared in the film Tilt the same year. He made a cameo appearance in the 1994 Ed Wood bio-pic starring Johnny Depp, directed by Tim Burton, which was Walcott's final role.

Walcott long regretted being associated with Plan 9, but eventually came to acknowledge the film's appeal and agreed to attend screenings. In a September 10, 2000, Los Angeles Times interview, he said, "It's better to be remembered for something than for nothing, don't you think?"

== Personal life ==
Walcott married Barbara May Watkins, and they had a son and two daughters. They were married for 55 years until her death in 2010.

=== Death ===
He died of natural causes on March 20, 2015, in his home in Canoga Park, California, aged 87.

== Filmography ==
List of acting performances in film
Year	Title	Role	Notes
1952	Red Skies of Montana	Randy O'Neill	Uncredited
1952	Fearless Fagan	MP at Gate	Uncredited
1952	Battle Zone	Rifleman	Uncredited
1952	Above and Beyond	Burns	Uncredited
1955	Battle Cry	Sgt. Jim Beller	
1955	Strange Lady in Town	Scanlon	
1955	Mister Roberts	Shore Patrolman	
1955	The McConnell Story	Military Policeman	
1955	Texas Lady	Deputy Jess Folley	
1955	The Court-Martial of Billy Mitchell	Howard Millikan	Uncredited
1956	The Lieutenant Wore Skirts	Lt. Sweeney	
1956	The Steel Jungle	Guard Weaver	
1956	Thunder Over Arizona	Mark Warren	
1957	The Persuader	Jim Cleery	
1957	Plan 9 from Outer Space	Jeff Trent	
1958	Jet Attack	Lt. Bill Clairbone	
1958	Badman's Country	Bat Masterson	
1961	On the Double	Colonel Rock Houston	
1961	The Outsider	Sgt. Kiley	
1963	Captain Newman, M.D.	Capt. Howard	
1967	Bill Wallace of China	Bill Wallace	Also producer
1969	Changes	Businessman / Job Interviewer	Uncredited
1972	Prime Cut	Weenie	
1972	Joe Kidd	Sheriff Mitchell	
1972	Man of the East	Bull Schmidt	
1973	The Last American Hero	Cleve Morley	
1974	The Sugarland Express	Officer Mashburn	
1974	Thunderbolt and Lightfoot	Used Car Salesman	
1975	The Eiger Sanction	Pope	
1976	Midway	Captain Elliott Buckmaster	
1978	Every Which Way but Loose	Putnam	
1979	Norma Rae	Lamar Miller	
1979	Tilt	Mr. Davenport	
1980	To Race the Wind	Don Summerfun	
1987	House II: The Second Story	Sheriff	
1994	Ed Wood	Potential Backer	Cameo appearance

List of acting performances in television
Year	Title	Role	Notes
1958	Sugarfoot	Duke McKlintock	Episode: "Bullet Proof"
1958–59	The Rifleman	Sid Halpern/Blade Kelby	2 episodes
1959	Perry Mason	Bill Johnson	Episode: "The Case of the Howling Dog."
1960	The Magical World of Disney	Henderson	2 episodes
1960	Simon Lash: The Black Book	Lt. Wile	TV movie
1960–72	Bonanza	Various roles	7 episodes
1961–62	87th Precinct	Detective Roger Havilland	30 episodes
1963	The Dakotas	Tom Davis	
1975	Little House on the Prairie	Slick McBurney	Episode: "In the Big Inning"
1975–77	The Young and the Restless	Ralph Olson	
1976	The Quest	Blacksmith	Episode: "Pilot"
1976	Land of the Lost	Captain Diggs	Episode: "Medicine Man"
1977	Eight Is Enough	Dr. Richard Neil Hammer	Episode: "The Gipper Caper"
1978	Donner Pass: The Road to Survival	Will McKutcheon	TV movie
1979	CHiPs	Derk	Episode: "The Matchmakers"
1984	Alice	Big Jake Hunnicutt	Episode: "House Full of Hunnicutts"
