= The Clones (film) =

- Directed by: Lamar Card, Paul Hunt
- Written by: Lamar Card, Paul Hunt, Steve Fisher
- Screenplay by: Steve Fisher
- Story by: Lamar Card, Paul Hunt
- Starring: Michael Greene, Gregory Sierra, Otis Young, Susan Hunt, John Drew Barrymore
- Music by: Allen D. Allen
- Distributed by: Filmakers International, New World International
- Release date: 1973
- Running time: 93 minutes
- Country: United States
- Language: English

The Clones (stylized as The Clōnes) is a theatrically released 1973 low-budget science fiction thriller notable for introducing asexual reproduction via cloning to pop culture; it predates Dolly the Sheep by 23 years.

== Plot ==
At the Pacific Institute of Technology, nuclear scientist Dr. Gerald Appleby (Michael Greene) experiences a dramatic equipment failure at his fusion lab that is then never referenced again.

The same day, he finds a doppelgänger is stealing his identity. The head of security at his workplace, Fred Kalif (Raynold Gideon), and the police suspect Appleby is the imposter—a grave presumption, given the sensitivity of Appleby's work. He escapes the police. A long chase ensues.

Kalif instructs the doppelgänger to kill Appleby on sight, leaving the doppelgänger perplexed enough to call Nobelist Carl Swafford (Stanley Adams) for answers. Ironically, the real Appleby walks into Swafford's office at the end of the call. Kalif surreptitiously injects Appleby with a sedative, but Appleby incapacitates Kalif first. The chase resumes.

Appleby knocks out Officer Nemo (Gregory Sierra) and hitchhikes to gain some distance on his pursuers. The people who he hitches with cause him to hit his head, so they take him to a hospital, where acquaintance Dr. Jim Bradigan (Lamar Card) finds him. Jim tips him off that Swafford's research is in cloning human twins. Appleby now appreciates the doppelgänger is likely his clone. Nemo arrives at the hospital with his partner, Officer Sawyer (Otis Young), but not before Appleby escapes again. The chase resumes.

Appleby circles back to Swafford's lab and discovers the cloning procedure in action, on himself. He locks up Swafford and his first clone, and flees with documentation to prove his innocence. His second clone dies from equipment failure.

Appleby reaches a friend at the FBI, Phil Simmons (uncredited). Appleby enlists the aid of his girlfriend, Penny (Susan Hunt), who now believes him because clone #1 figured out the truth and told her. Appleby is told Simmons was killed by someone sets him up—so the audience doesn't know whether Simmons was killed or tipped off the two CID officers.

Nemo and Sawyer catch up to Appleby but Appleby escapes again, meeting up with clone #1 where Penny stashed him. Clone #1, now self-aware, willingly discloses the whole plan to Appleby: create 52 clones of Appleby (and three other scientists) to run 52 fusion plants worldwide, to energize the weather to the extent of being able to cause, e.g., tidal waves, as a weapon superior to hydrogen bombs –"ecological genocide."

Appleby and clone #1 cross paths with Stafford, who unwillingly reveals Penny's location. After arrival at said location, subsequent gunplay leads to the deaths of clone #1, Penny, Sawyer, Nemo, and Swafford, but a Swafford clone (or the original) then kills Appleby. The film ends with Swafford firing directly at the audience, breaking the fourth wall.

== Reviews ==
The film receives mixed reviews, primarily due to its mishandling of its intriguing premise and an unnecessarily cumbersome plot, but given its budget some of its cinema photography (the climax in an abandoned amusement park in particular) receive contemporary praise, as does its "effectively downbeat" twist ending. It has a 29% rank on Rotten Tomatoes, and while it has been released on VHS it has never had a major DVD release and has never appeared on Blu-ray. It aired on The CBS Late Movie on 17 November 1975 and 18 April 1977.
