= Claude Akins =

American actor (1926–1994)

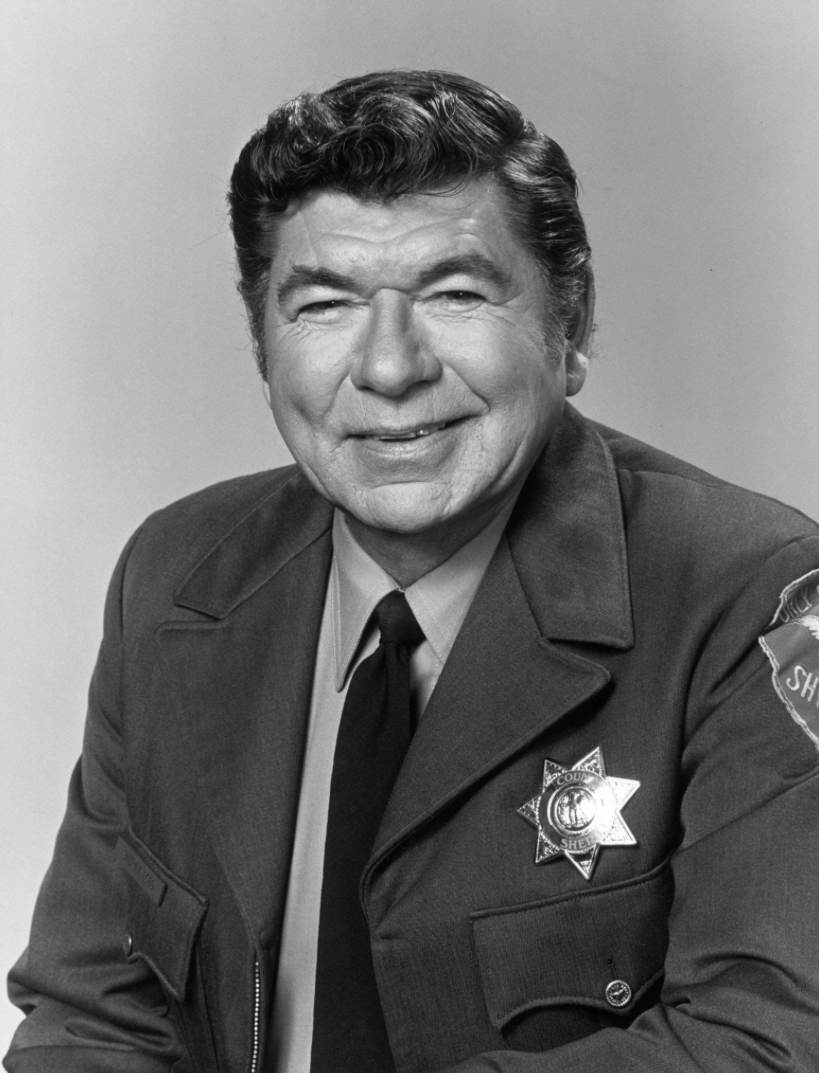
- Akins in The Misadventures of Sheriff Lobo, 1979
- Born: Claude Aubrey Akins; May 25, 1926; Nelson, Georgia, U.S.
- Died: January 27, 1994 (aged 67); Altadena, California, U.S.
- Occupation: Actor
- Years active: 1953–1993
- Spouse: Therese Fairfield (m. 1952–1994) (his death)
- Children: 3

Claude Aubrey Akins (May 25, 1926 – January 27, 1994) was an American character actor. He played Sonny Pruit in Movin' On, 1974–1976 American drama series about a trucking team; Sheriff Lobo on B.J. and the Bear and The Misadventures of Sheriff Lobo, 1979–1981 American action comedy television series; and in a variety of other roles on television as well as in feature films.

== Early years ==
Akins was born in Nelson, Georgia, and grew up in Bedford, Indiana, the son of Maude and Ernest Akins. Although film reference books gave his age at death as 75, Akins's son said his father was born in 1926, which is supported by public records. He was Cherokee.

Akins served in the Pacific with the U.S. Army Signal Corps during World War II. After the war, he graduated from Northwestern University in 1949, where he had majored in theatre arts and was trained in Shakespeare. He began his theatrical career at the Barter Theater in Abingdon, Virginia. He became an actor on Broadway in the late 1940s, and had a role in the play The Rose Tattoo.

== Film career ==
Akins was signed up by talent agent Meyer Mishkin and became one of "Meyer Mishkin's Band of Uglies," a group of character actors represented by Mishkin that included Lee Marvin, Charles Bronson, Jeff Chandler, James Coburn, Michael Ansara and Chuck Connors. He later recounted that early in his career demands were made on actors in low-budget movies that included doing their own stunts to save money. As a result, Akins once was run over by a wagon in one western.

As a film actor, Akins first appeared in From Here to Eternity (1953). In The Caine Mutiny (1954), he appeared as one of a pair of incorrigible seamen, Horrible and Meatball, the other played by Lee Marvin. He portrayed prisoner Joe Burdette in Rio Bravo (starring John Wayne, Ricky Nelson, Dean Martin, and Angie Dickinson). He played Naval Lt. Commander Farber in Don't Give Up the Ship, starring Jerry Lewis.

Akins appeared in Porgy and Bess (1959) and went on to portray Rockwell W. "Rocky" Rockman in The Devil's Brigade, the Reverend Jeremiah Brown in the movie Inherit the Wind (1960), outlaw Ben Lane in Comanche Station that same year. He was featured in Sam Fuller's 1962 film Merrill's Marauders, receiving critical acclaim for his performance as Sgt. Kolowicz, a hard-bitten, weary soldier, especially for a scene in which his unit rests for a short while in a Burmese village. Kolowicz is fed a bowl of rice by an elderly woman and weeps. Writing in his memoir A Third Face, Fuller said it was "one of the scenes I'm most proud of," and that whenever he sees it he bursts into tears.

He played Seely Jones in A Distant Trumpet (1964), and the gorilla leader Aldo in Battle for the Planet of the Apes (1973), the last original Apes movie.

He had a small part in The Sea Chase with John Wayne. He appeared with Yul Brynner and Robert Fuller in the film Return of the Seven (1966) (also called Return of the Magnificent Seven and The Magnificent Seven 2), and also appeared in the movie Seasons of the Heart (1993).

In a 1987 interview, Akins called his film career "disappointing," and said that his biggest regret was that he lost the role of "Dragline" in Cool Hand Luke (1967) to George Kennedy, who went on to win the Academy Award for Best Supporting Actor.

== Television ==
Akins was cast in myriad television series, including The Adventures of Superman (episode number 69, "Peril by Sea"), in which he plays a villainous conspirator, Crusader, I Love Lucy in which he portrays himself, and The Lucy Show. Much of his work was on Westerns, including Frontier, My Friend Flicka (three times), Boots and Saddles, Maverick, Northwest Passage, The Restless Gun (four times), The Sheriff of Cochise, Wagon Train (four times), Overland Trail, Frontier Circus, The Tall Man, The Rebel, The Big Valley, Daniel Boone, The Legend of Jesse James, Death Valley Days with Jane Russell, Dick Powell's Zane Grey Theatre (four times), The Rifleman (three times), Rawhide (seven times), Gunsmoke (1955–1975) (10 times), Bonanza (four times), The Alaskans (twice), The Texan (twice), and Bat Masterson (season 1, ep 29, "The Death of Bat Masterson").

He appeared once on Richard Diamond, Private Detective, Empire, Laredo ("The Treasure of San Diablo"), the syndicated series, Pony Express (in "The Story of Julesburg" with Sebastian Cabot and James Best), and The Oregon Trail, with Rod Taylor. He was cast as Jarret Sutton in "Escape to Memphis" (1959) and as Beaudry Rawlins in Duel on the River (1960) on Darren McGavin's NBC series, Riverboat.

Akins played a rodeo clown convicted of armed robbery in "Killer on Horseback", an episode of the NBC anthology series Star Stage, which became the pilot episode for the syndicated police drama State Trooper, starring Rod Cameron. The episode was later broadcast on the regular series as "Rodeo Rough House". Akins also appeared in the 1963 episode "The Chooser of the Slain" on the ABC/Warner Bros. Western series, The Dakotas.

Among Akins's four appearances on NBC's Laramie with series stars John Smith and Robert Fuller was the role of former Sheriff Jim Dark in the episode "Queen of Diamonds" (September 20, 1960).

Akins was featured in two episodes of the original CBS series The Twilight Zone ("The Little People" and "The Monsters Are Due on Maple Street"). He also guest-starred in three episodes each of Combat! (fourth and fifth seasons) and The Untouchables. He made a comedic turn on Hazel, as a frustrated painter.

He appeared on Rod Cameron's early syndicated series, City Detective, Meet McGraw with Frank Lovejoy, the ABC/WB drama, The Roaring 20's, and Police Story.

Akins's other early appearances included a role as a policeman on Alfred Hitchcock Presents in "Place of Shadows" (1956) and "Reward to Finder" (1957). He played another television cop, good-natured Sheriff's Detective Phillip Dix, in the first season of the Perry Mason in "The Case of the Half-Wakened Wife" (episode 1-26) that aired March 15, 1958. He was in a first-season episode of Maverick titled "Burial Ground of the Gods" (1958) that starred Jack Kelly. In 1965, Akins played El Supremo in "The Man from U.N.C.L.E." episode, "The Very Important Zombie Affair". In 1967, Akins played Lt. Finch in The Lucy Show episode, "Lucy Meets the Law".

He portrayed prosecuting attorney Calvin Wolf opposite Carl Betz in an episode of Judd, for the Defense.

Akins was cast as Lou Myerson in the 1964 episode, "One Monday Afternoon", of the NBC education drama series, Mr. Novak, starring James Franciscus, and as Dr. Roy Kirk in an episode, "When Do They Hang the Good Samaritan?", of the CBS political drama, Slattery's People (which starred Richard Crenna). He played a kidnapper in a 1964 episode of The Fugitive. In 1965, he was featured in an episode of Kraft Suspense Theatre, playing a German infiltrator who went unsuspected. Also that year, Akins portrayed the head of an Irish immigrant family in The Big Valley ("The Brawlers"). Akins had an earlier role in the first season of Barnaby Jones; episode titled "Murder Go-Round".

Before his signature character Sheriff Lobo, Akins appeared as owner-operator trucker Sonny Pruitt in NBC's Movin' On, from 1974 to 1976, with Frank Converse. Akins starred in over 40 episodes of Movin' On, plus a made-for-TV movie "In Tandem". He also starred as a Nashville police detective, Stoney Huff, in the crime drama Nashville 99. Akins' best-known role of Sheriff Elroy P. Lobo had begun as a recurring character on the television series B.J. and the Bear. After becoming a recognizable name in the late 1970s, Akins did testimonial TV commercials for PoliGrip, Rollins Truck Leasing, and AAMCO Transmissions.

Akins found work in the late 1980s lending his voice talents to the work safety instructional video series, Safety Shorts, in which he expounded on the virtues of workplace safety to thousands of industrial employees, offering lessons on the importance of lockout/tagout procedures, personal protective equipment, and the MSDS documentation process. Akins made a golfing video with Ron Masak, entitled Tom Kite and Friends.

Akins also made a latter-day appearance on In the Heat of the Night, starring Carroll O'Connor.

== Personal life ==
Akins was married to Therese Fairfield from 1952 until his death. His widow died on June 12, 2006. They had three children together.

== Illness and death ==
Akins died of stomach cancer in Altadena, California, on January 27, 1994, at the age of 67. In May 1993, half of his stomach had been removed in cancer surgery. He was cremated, and his ashes were returned to Altadena.

== Legacy ==
Akins told an interviewer in 1987 that he felt "like an outsider in a business I have been a part of for 37 years. For some reason, Hollywood's mainstream has eluded me." Said Akins: "A guy who looks like Robert Redford will most often be cast as a hero. A guy like me or Ernie Borgnine plays a lot of heavies. If you're big, they think you're tough. And if you're tough, they think you're dumb."

The Claude Akins Memorial Golf Classic, a six-person scramble-format golf tournament, takes place at Otis Park Golf Course in Bedford, Indiana, in August or September of each year. Proceeds from the event go to the Akins Scholarship and the Bedford Recreation Foundation Scholarship, given every year to a graduating senior at Bedford North Lawrence High School, as well as many projects involving recreation and improvements.

In 1986, Akins attended the 55th annual American Indian Exposition in Anadarko, Oklahoma. Akins, who was part Cherokee, was a guest speaker and received the Outstanding Indian/Native American of the Year Award.

== Selected filmography ==
=== Film ===
- Man in the Saddle (1951)
- From Here to Eternity (1953) as Sergeant "Baldy" Dhom (uncredited)
- Bitter Creek (1954) as Vance Morgan - Henchman
- Witness to Murder (1954) as Police Officer (uncredited)
- The Caine Mutiny (1954) as Seaman Dlugatch a.k.a. "Horrible"
- The Raid (1954) as Lieutenant Ramsey (uncredited)
- Shield for Murder (1954) as Fat Michaels
- Down Three Dark Streets (1954) as Matty Pavelich
- The Human Jungle (1954) as George Mandy
- The Adventures of Hajji Baba (1954) as Chief Executioner's Aide (uncredited)
- The Sea Chase (1955) as Winkler
- Man with the Gun (1955) as Jim Reedy (uncredited)
- Battle Stations (1956) as Marty Brennan
- The Proud and Profane (1956) as Big Soldier (uncredited)
- Johnny Concho (1956) as Lem
- The Burning Hills (1956) as Ben Hindeman
- The Sharkfighters (1956) as Chief "Gordy" Gordon
- Hot Summer Night (1957) as Truck Driver
- The Kettles on Old MacDonald's Farm (1957) as Pete Logan
- The Lonely Man (1957) as Blackburn
- Joe Dakota (1957) as Aaron Grant
- The Defiant Ones (1958) as Mack
- Onionhead (1958) as Poznicki
- Rio Bravo (1959) as Joe Burdette
- Bat Masterson (1959) as Jack Fontana
- Porgy and Bess (1959) as Detective
- Don't Give Up the Ship (1959) as Lieutenant Commander Farber
- Hound-Dog Man (1959) as Hog Peyson
- Yellowstone Kelly (1959) as Sergeant
- Comanche Station (1960) as Ben Lane
- Inherit the Wind (1960) as Reverend Jeremiah Brown
- Claudelle Inglish (1961) as S.T. Crawford
- Merrill's Marauders (1962) as Sergeant Kolowicz
- Black Gold (1962) as Chick Carrington
- A Distant Trumpet (1964) as Seely Jones
- The Killers (1964) as Earl Sylvester
- Ride Beyond Vengeance (1966) as Elwood Coates
- Incident at Phantom Hill (1966) as Krausman
- Return of the Seven (1966) as Frank
- First to Fight (1967) as Captain Mason
- Waterhole #3 (1967) as Sergeant Henry Foggers
- The Devil's Brigade (1968) as Private Rocky Rockman
- The Great Bank Robbery (1969) as Slade
- A Man Called Sledge (1970) as Hooker
- Flap (1970) as Lobo Jackson
- The Night Stalker (1972) as Sheriff Butcher
- Skyjacked (1972) as Sergeant Ben Puzo
- Battle for the Planet of the Apes (1973) as General Aldo
- The Death Squad (1974, TV Movie) as Connie Brennan
- Timber Tramps (1975) as Matt
- Eric (1975) as Stanley 'Stan' Swenson
- Tentacoli (1977) as Sheriff Robards
- Killer on Board (1977) as Oscar Billingham
- Tarantulas: The Deadly Cargo (1977) as Bert Springer
- Concrete Cowboys (1979) as Woody Stone
- The Baron and the Kid (1984) as Harley
- Battle of the Monster Trucks (1985)
- Monster in the Closet (1986) as Sheriff Sam Ketchem
- Manhunt for Claude Dallas (1986) as Bill Pogue
- The Curse (1987) as Nathan
- Pushed Too Far (1988) as Sheriff Jim Forrest
- The Gambler Returns: The Luck of the Draw (1991, TV Movie) as President Theodore Roosevelt
- Incident at Victoria Falls (1991, TV Movie) as Theodore Roosevelt
- Where Evil Lives (1991) as Jack Devlin
- Falling from Grace (1992) as Speck Parks
- Seasons of the Heart (1993) as Pastor William Clay
- Twisted Fear (1994) as Detective Lucky Douglas

=== Television ===
- Dragnet - episode "The Big Drink" - Ellis (1954); episode "The Big Mistress" - Sergeant Jack McCreadie (1954)
- Gunsmoke - 10 episodes - various (1955–1972)
- Alfred Hitchcock Presents (1956) (Season 1 Episode 22: "Place of Shadows") - Cop
- The Adventures of Superman - episode "Peril by Sea" - Ace Miller (1956)
- The Sheriff of Cochise - episode "Manhunt" - Harry Clegg (1956)
- I Love Lucy - episode "Desert Island" - (1956)
- The Adventures of Jim Bowie - episode "Land Jumpers" - a settler (1956); episode "A Grave for Jim Bowie" - Miciah "Big" Hart (1958)
- The Silent Service - episode "Boomerang" - Torpedoman Frank Herndon (1957)
- Have Gun - Will Travel - episode "The Great Mojave Case" - Dever (1957)
- The Adventures of McGraw - episode "Mojave" - Jim Bennett (1957)
- Alfred Hitchcock Presents (1957) (Season 3 Episode 6: "Reward to Finder") - Cop
- The Restless Gun - episode "Trail to Sunset" - West Flagler (1957)
- The Restless Gun - episode "Thicker Than Water" - Mr. Marlowe (1957)
- The Restless Gun - episode "The Gold Buckle" - Lex Springer (1957)
- Wagon Train - episode "The John Cameron Story" - Rich Tacker (1957)
- Tales of Wells Fargo - 5 episodes - various (1957–1961)
- Cheyenne - episode "The Long Search" - Sheriff Bob Walters (1958)
- Wagon Train - episode "The Monty Britton Story" - Garth Redmond (1958)
- Perry Mason Season 1 Episode 26: "The Case of the Half-Wakened Wife" (1958)
- Maverick - Episode "Burial Ground of the Gods" - Paisley Briggs (1958)
- The Rifleman - episode "The Safe Guard" - Floyd Doniger (1958)
- Yancy Derringer - episodes "Gallatin Street" and "Collectors Item" - Toby Cook (1958–1959)
- 77 Sunset Strip - episode "Lovely Alibi" - Ed Bird (1959)
- The Restless Gun - episode "Melany" (1959)
- Steve Canyon - (1959) - Sergeant Brecker - Season 1/Episode 25: "The Sergeant"
- Bat Masterson - episode "The Death of Bat Masterson" - Jack Fontana (1959)
- Dick Powell's Zane Grey Theatre - episode "Ransom" - "Simmy" the Comanchero (1960)
- The Untouchables- episodes The Unhired Assassin part 1 as Jake "Dodo" Ryan (1960), The Monkey Wrench as Karl Hansa (1962), The Spoiler as Vince Majesky (1963)
- Laramie - episode "Death Wind", s1 ep20 - Sergeant Major Tom Cole (1960)
- Pony Express - episode "The Story of Juiesberg" (1960)
- Overland Trail - episode "Fire in the Hole" - Jumbo (1960)
- Wanted: Dead or Alive - episode "Prison Trail" - Jack Kelly (1960)
- The Rebel – episode "The Waiting" – Tom Hall (1960)
- Wagon Train - episode "The Roger Bigelow Story" - Wes Varney (1960)
- Riverboat - episode "Duel on the River" - Beaudry Rawlins (1960)
- Rawhide (1960) – Jim Lark in S2:E13, "Incident of the Druid Curse"
- Bonanza - episodes "Desert Justice" (1960) as Marshal Emmett Dowd, "The Mill" (1960) as Ezekiel (1960), "Sam Hill" (1961) as Sam Hill and "The Deserter" (1962) as Colonel Edward J. Dunwoody
- The Twilight Zone - episodes "The Monsters Are Due on Maple Street" as Steve Brand (1960) and "The Little People" as Commander Fletcher (1962)
- Wagon Train - episode "The Selena Hartnell Story" - Will Cotrell (1961)
- Rawhide (1961) – Clete Manson in S3:E24, "Incident of the Lost Idol"
- Rawhide (1961) – Karse in S4:E2, "The Sendoff"
- Rawhide (1962) – Gus Marsdon in S5:E6, "Incident of the Four Horsemen"
- Rawhide (1962) – Sergeant Parker in S5:E13, "Incident at Quivira"
- The Alfred Hitchcock Hour (1962) (Season 1 Episode 10: "Day of Reckoning") - Sheriff Jordan
- Laramie - 4 episodes - various (1960–1963)
- The Fugitive - Season 1 Episode 27 - Ralph Simmons (1964)
- Rawhide (1964) – Aloysius Claybank in S5:E6, "Incident of the Rusty Shotgun"
- Rawhide (1965) – Jerry Boggs in S8:E4, "Walk into Terror"
- Daniel Boone (1965) - as Toka in S1:E17 · "A Place of 1,000 Spirits"
- Gunsmoke - "Bad Lady From Brookline" - as Sy (1965)
- The F.B.I. - episode "How to Murder an Iron Horse" - Ben Gambriella (1965)
- The Big Valley - "The Brawlers" - (1965)
- The Man from U.N.C.L.E. - "The Very Important Zombie Affair" - El Supremo (1965)
- A Man Called Shenandoah - episode "Obion-1866" - Frody Brown (1965)
- Branded - episode "Vindicator" - Ned Travis (1965)
- Hazel - episode "But Is It Art?" - Milwaukee Ames (1966)
- Combat! - episodes "Ask Me No Questions" as Mastin, "Ollie Joe" as Charlie Pelton and "Nightmare on the Red Ball Run" as Rosie (1966–1967)
- Laredo - episodes "Limit of the Law", "The Treasure of San Diablo", "Hey Diddle Diddle", "A Question of Guilt", and "Walk Softly" - Cotton Buckmeister (1966–1967)
- The Guns of Will Sonnett - episode "Ride the Long Trail" - Turnbaugh (1967)
- Hondo - episode "Hondo and the Gladiators" - Brock (1967)
- The Lucy Show - episode "Lucy Meets the Law" (1967)
- The F.B.I. - episode "Dark Journey" - Jason Peale (1972)
- McMillan & Wife - episode "The Face of Murder" - Freddie O'Neal (1972)
- The Rookies - episode "Margin For Error" - Officer Buck Sanborn (1972)
- The Streets of San Francisco - episode "A String of Puppets" - Bob Mason (1972)
- Cannon - episode 3x05, "Target in the Mirror" - Lieutenant Bill Blaine (1973)
- Barnaby Jones - episode "Murder-Go-Round" - Eli Rile (1973)
- Mission: Impossible - episode "Speed" - Sam Hibbling (1973)
- Police Story - 3 episodes - various (1973–1978)
- The Norliss Tapes - TV movie - Sheriff Tom Hartley (1973)
- In Tandem - TV movie (pilot for Movin' On) - Sonny Pruitt (1974)
- Movin' On - 45 episodes - Sonny Pruitt (1974–1976)
- Eric as father of Eric Lund (1975)
- McCloud - episode "The Colorado Cattle Caper" (1974)
- Mannix - episode "Mask for a Charade" - Sergeant Al Reardon (1974)
- The Rhinemann Exchange (1977) (TV miniseries) as Walter Kendall
- B. J. and the Bear - at least 5 episodes - Sheriff Elroy P. Lobo (1978–1979)
- The Misadventures of Sheriff Lobo - 38 episodes - Sheriff Elroy P. Lobo - (1978–1979)
- Concrete Cowboys - episode "Concrete Cowboys" - Woody Stone (1979)
- Fantasy Island - episode "Lillian Russell/The Lagoon" - Calvin Pearson (1981)
- Darkroom - episode "Uncle George" - Bert Haskell (1981)
- The Master - episode "Max" - Mr. Trumball (January 20, 1984)
- Murder, She Wrote - 4 episodes - Ethan Cragg (1984)
- Tall Tales & Legends - episode "Pecos Bill" - Grandpa/Narrator (1986)
- Dream West - TV mini-series - Tom Fitzpatrick (1986)
- Matlock - episode "The Thoroughbred" - Sam Taylor (1989)
- Hunter - episode "The Legion" - Andy (1990)
- In the Heat of the Night - episode "An Eye for an Eye" - Benjamin Sloan (1991)
- Eerie, Indiana - episode "The Hole in the Wall Gang" - Grungy Bill (1992)
