= The Dakotas (TV series) =

American Western drama television series

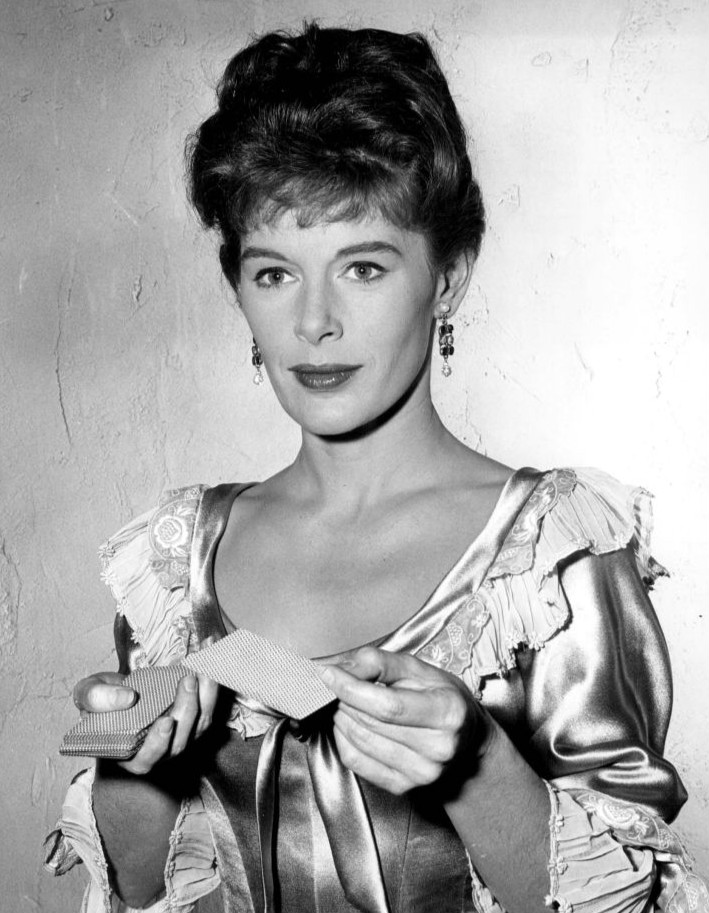
- Diane Brewster as the wife, Jody Fargo, of a double-dealing lawman played by David Brian in the episode "Fargo" (1963)
- Genre: Western
- Directed by: Allan A. Buckhantz; Stuart Heisler; Paul Landres; Charles R. Rondeau; Robert Totten; Gordon Bau (make-up)
- Starring: Larry Ward; Jack Elam; Chad Everett; Mike Greene
- Theme music composer: Harold Levey; Kenneth S. Webb
- Country of origin: United States
- Original language: English
- No. of seasons: 1
- No. of episodes: 20 (1 unaired: Black Gold)

Production
- Executive producer: William T. Orr
- Producer: Anthony Spinner
- Production location: California
- Running time: 50 minutes
- Production company: Warner Bros. Television

Original release
- Network: ABC
- Release: January 7 – May 13, 1963

Related
- Cheyenne

The Dakotas is an ABC/Warner Bros. Western television series starring Larry Ward and featuring Jack Elam, Chad Everett, and Michael Greene, broadcast during 1963. The short-lived program is considered a spin-off of Clint Walker's Cheyenne.

The Dakotas was cancelled one week after heavy viewer protest over an objectionable scene.

== Synopsis ==
The series follows the efforts of U.S. Marshal Frank Ragan (Larry Ward) and his three deputies, J. D. Smith (Jack Elam), Vance Porter (Mike Greene), and Del Stark (Chad Everett) as they try to keep order in the Dakota Territory during the Gilded Age prior to statehood in 1889.

== Series history ==
All four characters initially appeared in an April 23, 1962, episode of Cheyenne entitled "A Man Called Ragan", directors Richard C. Sarafian and Robert Sparr (uncredited), and writers Anthony Spinner (teleplay) and Harry Whittington (story).

However, the degree to which this episode makes The Dakotas a spin-off of Cheyenne is debatable. In the pilot on Cheyenne, the titular character of Cheyenne Bodie never appears. Also, the episode had followed five consecutive weeks of Bronco episodes, broadcast as a part of the wheel series that Cheyenne had effectively become. Moreover, the length of time between pilot and series—almost eight months—further weakened the link between Cheyenne and The Dakotas. The biggest tip-off to viewers as to the parentage of the series was that it had assumed the Monday 7:30 p.m. ET time slot previously occupied since 1959 by Cheyenne.

== Guest stars ==
Among the many guest stars, George Macready appeared as Captain Ridgeway, with Jeanne Cooper as Rebecca Ridgeway, in the third episode, "Mutiny at Fort Mercy". Chris Robinson was cast as Chino in "Red Sky over Bismarck", with Andrew Duggan as Colonel Winters and Kevin Hagen as a preacher. Warren Stevens and Karen Sharpe played Cain and Angela Manning in the episode, "Crisis at High Banjo"; Robert J. Wilke was cast in the same episode as Judge Markham.

Other guest stars included:

- Claude Akins
- Chris Alcaide
- Fred Aldrich
- Robert Anderson
- Edward Binns
- Whit Bissell
- Willis Bouchey
- Lane Bradford
- Stewart Bradley
- John Brandon
- Diane Brewster
- Steve Brodie
- Joe Brooks
- Anthony Call
- Spencer Chan
- Michael Constantine
- Russ Conway
- Elisha Cook Jr.
- Ted de Corsia
- Susanne Cramer
- Richard H. Cutting
- Audrey Dalton
- Royal Dano
- Frank DeKova
- Bill Erwin
- William Fawcett
- Med Flory
- Joan Freeman
- Victor French
- Beverly Garland
- Coleen Gray
- Herman Hack
- Carl Held
- Rex Holman
- Richard Jaeckel
- Russell Johnson
- I. Stanford Jolley
- Don Keefer
- DeForest Kelley
- Don Kennedy
- Werner Klemperer
- Nolan Leary
- Norman Leavitt
- Dayton Lummis
- Strother Martin
- Ken Mayer
- Mercedes McCambridge
- Rod McGaughy
- Roger Mobley
- Joanna Moore
- Ed Nelson
- Dennis Patrick
- Sue Randall
- Joseph Ruskin
- Telly Savalas
- Alex Sharp
- Robert F. Simon
- Everett Sloane
- Karl Swenson
- Harry Townes
- Lee Van Cleef
- James Westerfield
- Gregory Walcott

== Cancellation ==
When viewers saw the program's eighteenth episode, "Sanctuary at Crystal Springs", they were shocked by a scene that depicted the lawmen killing two outlaws in a church, one of whom had caused injury to a pastor, played by Charles Irving, before dying. Calls for The Dakotas to end its run were answered virtually overnight. After just one more episode, the show was pulled. A twentieth episode, entitled "Black Gold", was completed, but was never shown.

== Episodes ==
Several episode titles refer to geographic place names in the Dakotas.

No. in season	Title	Directed by	Written by	Original release date
(Note: "A Man Called Ragan" was presented as an episode in season 6 of Cheyenne in 1962)	"A Man Called Ragan"	Richard C. Sarafian, Robert Sparr (Uncredited)	Story by : Harry Whittington; Teleplay by : Anthony Spinner	April 23, 1962
1	"Return To Dryrock"	Stuart Heisler	Story by : Robert E. Thompson; Teleplay by : Cy Chermak	January 7, 1963
2	"Red Sky Over Bismarck"	Stuart Heisler	Story by : Harry Whittington; Teleplay by : Anthony Spinner	January 14, 1963
3	"Mutiny at Fort Mercy"	Stuart Heisler	Story by : Leo Lieberman; Teleplay by : Leo Lieberman and E.M. Parsons	January 21, 1963
4	"Trouble at French Creek"	Stuart Heisler	E.M. Parsons	January 28, 1963
5	"Thunder In Pleasant Valley"	Paul Landres	Story by : Joyce Fierro; Teleplay by : S.S.Schweitzer	February 4, 1963
6	"Crisis at High Banjo"	Stuart Heisler	Cy Chermak	February 11, 1963
7	"Requiem at Dancer's Hill"	Paul Landres	Peter B. Germano	February 18, 1963
8	"Fargo"	Stuart Heisler	Story by : Mel Goldberg; Teleplay by : E.M. Parsons	February 25, 1963
9	"Incident at Rapid City"	Allan A. Buckhantz	Nicholas E. Baehr	March 4, 1963
10	"Justice at Eagle's Nest"	Robert Totten	S.S.Schweitzer	March 11, 1963
11	"Walk Through the Badlands"	Richard L. Bare	William Mourne	March 18, 1963
12	"Trial at Grand Forks"	Stuart Heisler	Story by : Sy Salkowitz; Teleplay by : Peter B. Germano	March 25, 1963
13	"Reformation at Big Nose Butte"	Robert Totten	Cy Chermak	April 1, 1963
14	"One Day In Vermillion"	Allan A. Buckhantz	Dean Riesner	April 8, 1963
15	"Terror at Heart River"	Stuart Heisler	William Mourne	April 15, 1963
16	"The Chooser of the Slain"	Richard C. Sarafian, Charles R. Rondeau (Uncredited)	Dean Riesner	April 22, 1963
17	"Feud at Snake River"	Charles R. Rondeau	Richard H. Landau	April 29, 1963
18	"Sanctuary at Crystal Springs"	Richard C. Sarafian	Cy Chermak	May 6, 1963
19	"A Nice Girl From Goliath"	Charles R. Rondeau	E.M. Parsons	May 13, 1963
20	"Black Gold"	N/A	N/A	Unaired

== Home media ==
On March 24, 2015, Warner Bros. released The Dakotas- The Complete Series on DVD via their Warner Archive Collection. This is a manufacture-on-demand (MOD) release, available through Warner's online store and Amazon.com.
