= I Sailed to Tahiti with an All Girl Crew =

- Original film poster
- Directed by: Richard L. Bare
- Written by: Richard L Bare; Henry Irving
- Based on: story by Richard L Bare & George O'Hanlon
- Produced by: Richard L. Bare
- Starring: Gardner McKay; Fred Clark; Pat Buttram; Diane McBain
- Cinematography: Frederick Gately; Leonard J. South
- Edited by: John F. Schreyer
- Music by: Philip Springer
- Production companies: National Telefilm Associates; United National
- Distributed by: World Entertainment
- Release date: September 1969
- Running time: 95 minutes
- Country: United States
- Language: English

I Sailed to Tahiti with an All Girl Crew is a 1969 American adventure comedy film directed and co-written by Richard L. Bare, starring Gardner McKay, Fred Clark, Pat Buttram, and Diane McBain.

It was the last film for both McKay and Clark.

== Plot ==
Terry bets his friend Josh $20,000 that he can beat him in a boat race to Tahiti while using an all-female crew. Terry collects a crew including a murderess and a cocktail waitress.

== Cast ==
- Gardner McKay as Terry O'Brien
- Fred Clark as Generous Josh
- Pat Buttram as Blodgett
- Diane McBain as Liz Clark
- Richard Denning as the Commodore
- Betty South as the Commodore's wife
- Edy Williams as Marilyn
- Jeanne Rainer as Monique
- Zulu as Kino, the Jailer
- Arlene Charles as Janet
- Mary O'Brien as Jimsy
- Bebe Louie as Tomaya
- Douglas Mossman as Island Chief
- Al Alawi as Chimp Leader
- Duke Kahanamoku as surfer

== Production ==
Gardner McKay was best known for the TV series Adventures in Paradise, Diane McBain was a regular on television's Surfside 6 and Richard Denning occasionally played the Governor of Hawaii on Hawaii Five-O. The film was financed by World Entertainment Corp, a subsidiary of NTA.

Filming started 22 May 1967 on location in Hawaii. Edy Williams was borrowed from 20th Century Fox.
