= Killer 77, Alive or Dead =

- Directed by: Mino Guerrini
- Written by: Alfonso Balcázar; Attilio Riccio
- Produced by: Solly V. Bianco
- Starring: Rod Dana
- Cinematography: Aldo Scavarda
- Music by: Federico Martínez Tudó; Mario Sensi
- Release date: 1966

Killer 77, Alive or Dead (Italian: Sicario 77, vivo o morto, Spanish: Agente End) is a 1966 Italian-Spanish Eurospy film directed by Mino Guerrini and starring Rod Dana.

== Cast ==
- Rod Dana as Lester (credited as Robert Mark)
- Alicia Brandet as Minnie
- John Stacy as Lester's Chief
- José Bódalo as George King
- Mónica Randall as Bárbara
- Armando Calvo as Mr. Heep
- María Badmajew as "Madame"
- Sonja Romanoff
- Demofilo Fidani as King's Lawyer
- Luciano Rossi as Dr. Krauss
- Antonio Casale

== Reception ==
The Italian film critic Marco Giusti describes the film as "complex, visually well constructed, never boring." The film bombed at the Italian box office, grossing about 21 million lire.
