= Donner Pass: The Road to Survival =

- Genre: Adventure; Historical drama
- Written by: S. S. Schweitzer
- Directed by: James L. Conway
- Starring: Robert Fuller; Andrew Prine; Michael Callan; Diane McBain
- Music by: Bob Summers
- Country of origin: United States
- Original language: English

Production
- Executive producer: Charles E. Sellier Jr.
- Producer: James Simmons
- Production locations: Colorado City, Arizona; Fredonia, Arizona; Kanab, Utah; Mount Timpanogos, Utah; Tom's Canyon, Utah
- Cinematography: Henning Schellerup
- Editor: Trevor Jolly
- Running time: 100 minutes
- Production companies: Schick Sunn Classic Pictures; NBC Entertainment

Original release
- Network: NBC
- Release: October 24, 1978

Donner Pass: The Road to Survival is a 1978 American historical drama television film about the Donner Party, directed by James L. Conway, written by S. S. Schweitzer, and produced by Schick Sunn Classic Pictures as a part of their Classics Illustrated series. It aired on NBC on October 24, 1978.

== Plot ==
A grim incident from American pioneer history is recreated as a determined group of settlers, facing almost insurmountable odds, struggles to reach California in 1846.

== Cast ==
- Robert Fuller as James Reed
- Andrew Prine as Keyser
- Michael Callan as William Eddy
- Diane McBain as Margaret Reed
- John Anderson as Patrick Breen
- John Doucette as George Donner
- Cynthia Eilbacher as Mary Graves
- Royal Dano as John Sutter
- Gregory Walcott as Will Mckutcheon
- Lance Le Gault as Charles Stanton
- Whit Bissell as Uncle Billy Graves
- Peg Stewart as Mrs. Breen

== Release ==
Donner Pass: The Road to Survival was shown on prime time television on NBC on October 24, 1978. The film was released on VHS on October 20, 1992, by Anchor Bay Entertainment.

== Reception ==
Film critic Kevin Thomas of the Los Angeles Times called it "gruelling to watch".
