= Kill the Wicked! =

1967 film

- Directed by: Tanio Boccia
- Written by: Mino Roli
- Starring: Larry Ward; Rod Dana
- Cinematography: Giuseppe Aquari
- Music by: Angelo Francesco Lavagnino
- Release date: 1967
- Language: English

Kill the Wicked! (Italian: Dio non paga il sabato, also known as God Does Not Pay on Saturday and Kill the Wickeds) is a 1967 Italian Spaghetti Western film directed by Tanio Boccia and starring Larry Ward and Rod Dana.

== Plot ==
The outlaw Braddock is to be hanged in the town for his crimes, but his comrades rescue him from execution. The gang hides out at an abandoned fort to rendezvous with Braddock's girlfriend Shelley. Randall is injured during a heist and left for dead. Lester, Braddock, and Shelley then hole up in a ghost town with their treasure.

A drifter Ben comes upon a stranded woman, Judy, and lends her a hand. Meanwhile, Braddock discovers a mysterious old woman Molly living in the ghost town just as Ben and Judy arrive. Not believing their backstories, the gang interrogates the pair.

While everyone else goes off to confirm the truth of Judy's story about a crashed wagon, Lester stays behind to torture Ben. Ben manages to turn the tables and escape Lester's captivity. The posse returns from their investigation to see Lester tied up. A shootout ensues, leaving the sand much bloodier than it had been.

== Cast ==
- Larry Ward as Benny Hudson
- Rod Dana as Randall (credited as Robert Mark)
- Furio Meniconi as Braddock
- Massimo Righi as Lester
- Maria Silva as Shelley
- Daniela Igliozzi as Judy Murray
- Vivi Gioi as Molly Warner
- Benito Stefanelli
