= Rod Dana =

American actor

- Born: Roger Francke; 8 August 1934 (age 91); Vernal, Utah
- Occupation: Actor

Rod Dana (born Roger Francke; 8 August 1934) is an American former actor, writer and model, mainly active in Italian cinema.

== Life and career ==
Born in Vernal, Utah, Dana started his career as a runway and photographic model in the late 1950s. After occasionally appearing in minor roles in a number of B-movies, he moved to Italy to pursue an acting career. In the second half of the 1960s starred in a number of genre films, mainly Eurospy and Spaghetti Western films, often credited as Robert Mark. In 2003 Dana wrote a novel, Conversations with the Devil: Dialogues with the Soul, under the pen name Jon Christian Eagle.

== Filmography ==
Year	Title	Role	Notes
1958	War of the Colossal Beast		
1958	How to Make a Monster	Lab Technician	
1959	The Miracle	Courier	Uncredited
1961	Sea Hunt		Season 4, Episode 10
1963	Cleopatra	One of Caesar's Entourage	Uncredited
1963	Gidget Goes to Rome	U.S. Embassy Marine	Uncredited
1965	I Knew Her Well	TV Interviewer	Uncredited
1966	Cast a Giant Shadow	Aide to Gen. Randolph	
1966	Vacanze sulla neve		
1966	Killer 77, Alive or Dead	Lester	
1966	Kill or Be Killed	Johnny Ringo	
1966	Operation White Shark	Pat Rosario, Agente AD3	
1967	Kill the Wicked!	Randall	
1967	Handle with Care	Mark Robin	
1969	Carnal Circuit	Charlie	Uncredited
1970	Let's Have a Riot	Piero	
1970	Hornets' Nest	U.S. Colonel	
1971 - 1972	Spectreman	Dr. Gori (English Dub)	
1985	Ladyhawke	Guard at the City Gate	
1988	The Last Temptation of Christ	Soldier	Uncredited, (final film role)
