= Gardner McKay =

American actor, artist, and author (1932–2001)

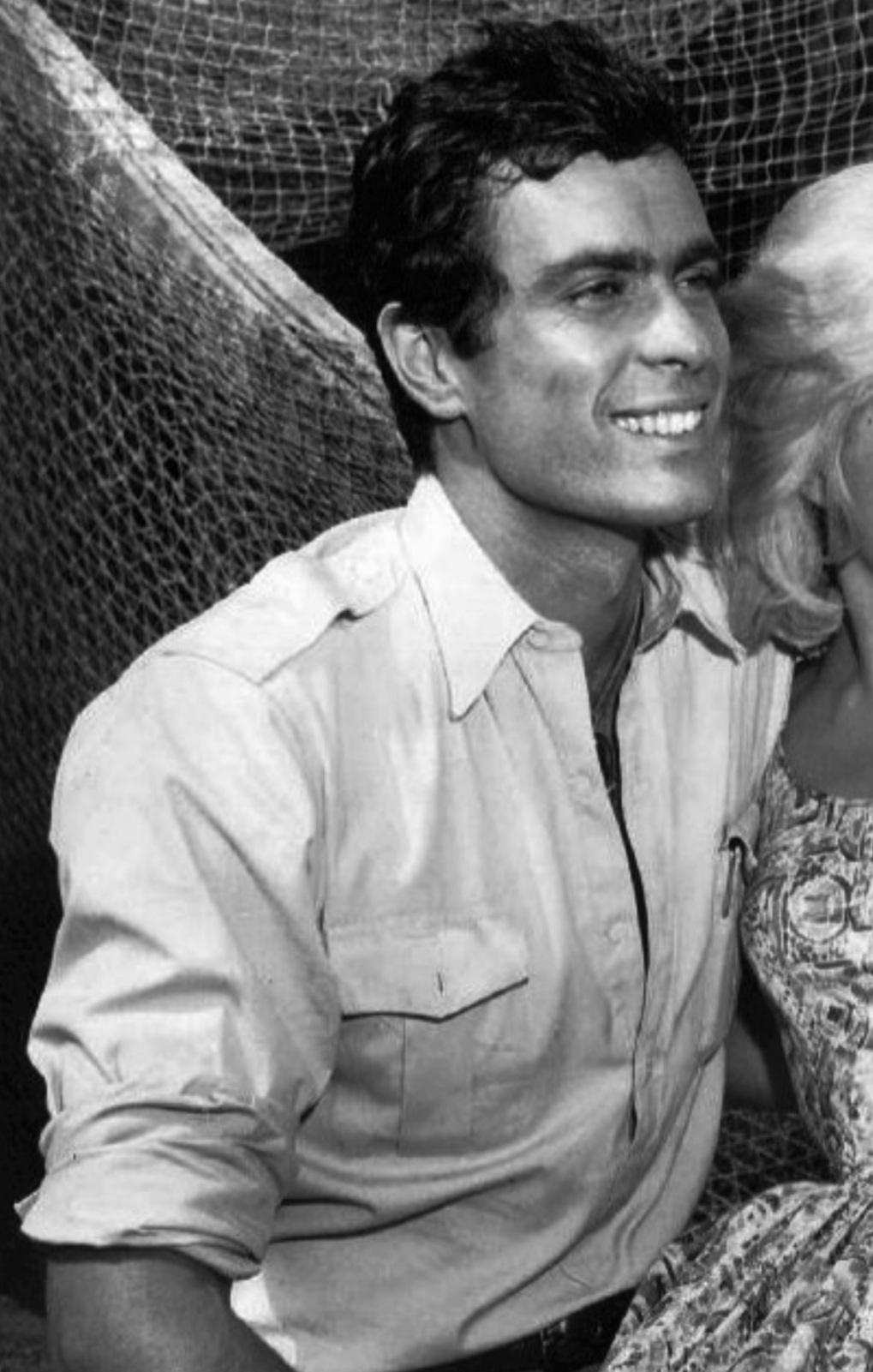
- McKay in Adventures in Paradise (1961)
- Born: George Cadogan Gardner McKay; June 10, 1932; New York City, U.S.
- Died: November 21, 2001 (aged 69); Hawaii Kai, Hawaii, U.S.
- Occupations: Actor; artist; author
- Years active: 1957–1970
- Height: 6 ft 5-in (1.96 m)
- Spouse: Madeleine Madigan
- Children: 2

George Cadogan Gardner McKay (June 10, 1932 – November 21, 2001) was an American actor, artist, and author. He is best known for the lead role in the TV series Adventures in Paradise, based loosely on the writings of James Michener. His character, Adam Troy, is a Korean War veteran who purchased the two-masted 82-foot (25 m) schooner Tiki III, and sailed the South Pacific. The show ran for three seasons on ABC from 1959 to 1962, for a total of 91 episodes.

== Early life ==
Born in New York City, McKay was the son of ad executive Hugh Deane McKay (born 1894) and socialite Catherine "Kitty" Gardner McKay (born 1904). He was the great-grandson of shipbuilder Donald McKay. The father's business took the family to Paris, where McKay attended private schools. The family returned to the United States shortly before the outbreak of World War II; McKay and his older brother, Hugh, lived with grandparents in Lexington, Kentucky. McKay later said that he fell in love with Kentucky and considered it paradise.

He attended Cornell University in Ithaca, New York for two years, where he majored in art. He wrote for The Cornell Daily Sun and the campus magazine. He dropped out of school at the age of 19 following the death of his father and moved to Greenwich Village where he worked as a sculptor and writer. McKay also took up photography and saw some of his work published in The New York Times and Life magazine.

McKay's sculpting appeared in the Museum of Modern Art in New York, and at an exhibit of his work McKay attracted the attention of photographer Richard Avedon. Avedon invited McKay to Paris to shoot a series of photographs with model Suzy Parker, which led to a modeling career. Town and Country magazine did a piece on McKay and his sculptures in its Man About Town section, which led to an offer from an agent.

== Career ==
McKay had been a sailor and schooner captain, a basketball star, equestrian and diver, a fisherman, model, sculptor and photographer. McKay impressed Dore Schary, who signed him to a contract with MGM. For that studio he appeared in episodes of The Thin Man and appeared in the film Raintree County, with Elizabeth Taylor and Montgomery Clift. The movie was partly filmed in Kentucky.

McKay left MGM and had television guest roles on Death Valley Days, The Silent Service, and Jefferson Drum.

In 1957–1958, McKay played United States Army Lieutenant Dan Kelly in the 38-episode syndicated western series Boots and Saddles, with co-stars Jack Pickard and Patrick McVey.

McKay screen-tested at 20th Century Fox for a TV series based on The Gunslinger, but failed to get the role. The test did, however, net him a long-term contract at the studio.

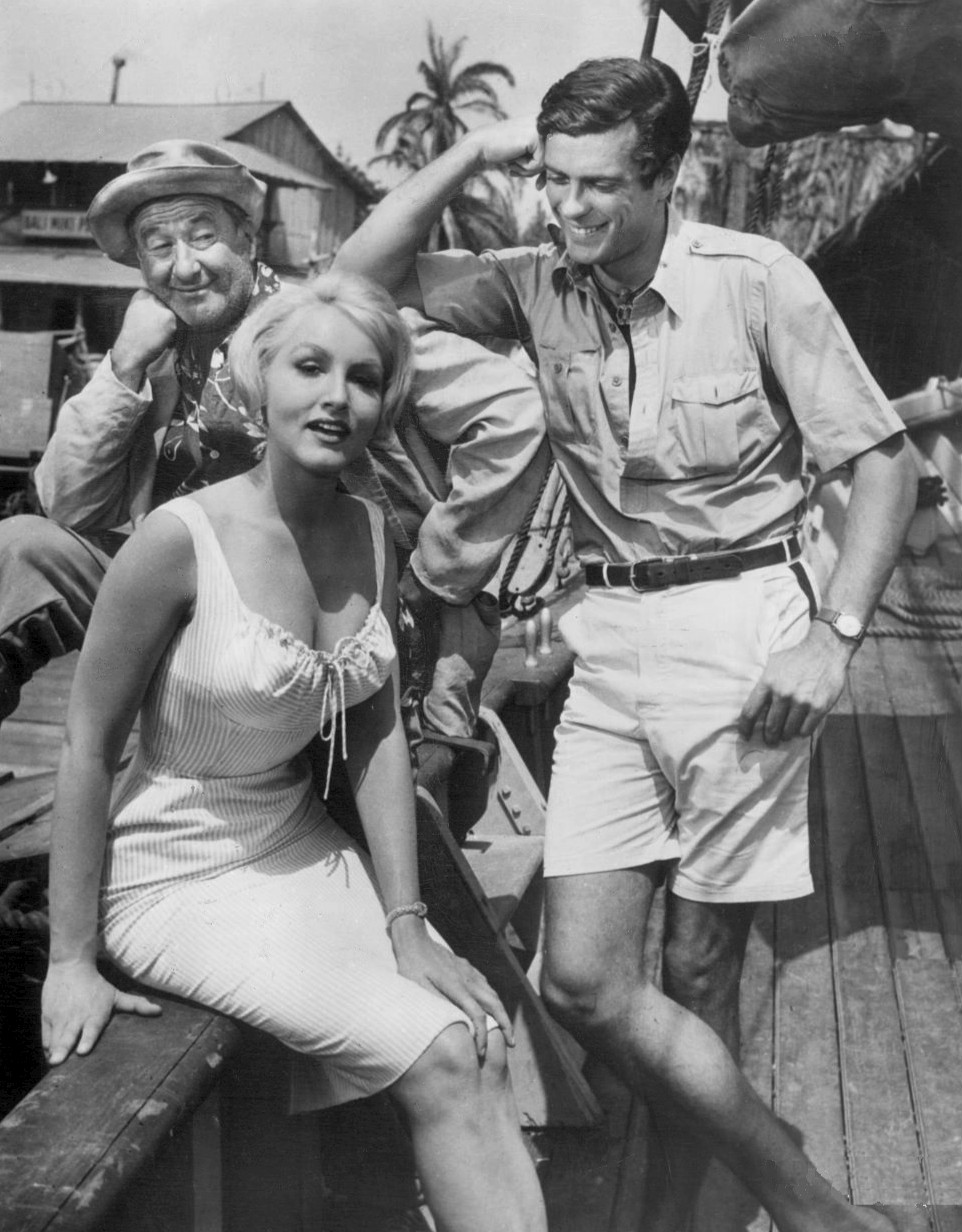
On set of Adventures in Paradise (1960), L–R: George Tobias, Julie Newmar & Gardner McKay

Dominick Dunne was searching for an actor to star in his planned Adventures in Paradise when he spotted McKay at the studio coffee shop. Dunne later said, "I didn't know who he was. He was an extraordinarily handsome guy. I said, 'Are you an actor?' I gave him my card and said, 'If you're interested, call me.'" McKay called, and ten actors were tested for the role. Dunne said of McKay: "His (test) was the worst, but everybody reacted to him, I mean everybody – especially the women."

Although previously unknown to the public, McKay was featured on the cover of the July 6, 1959 issue of Life just two months before the series premiered. The article noted that he had been around boats since childhood and was an experienced seaman.

During the series' run, McKay had small roles in several Fox films, including Holiday for Lovers (1959) and The Right Approach (1961).

McKay returned to Hollywood in 1963, and had a supporting role in Fox's The Pleasure Seekers (1964).

McKay's final film was the 1968 I Sailed to Tahiti with an All Girl Crew, written and directed by Richard L. Bare.

"It took me 100 hours to become a good actor," said McKay. "Then I committed professional suicide."

McKay had just decided to end his acting career, when he got a phone call from the noted director George Cukor, offering him the opportunity to star in a romantic comedy film opposite Marilyn Monroe. The film was Something's Got to Give. McKay had made up his mind and turned it down. Cukor and Monroe were shocked. Monroe phoned him to see if she could get him to change his mind. McKay said, "She was so delightful on the phone, so winning, so seductive in a way," but he said no. He added "I didn’t belong in acting." The part went to Dean Martin and the film was never completed. Instead McKay went sailing in the Caribbean and South America for a year and a half. "Not doing anything really," he said later. "I didn't give myself an excuse for being there." He moved to Paris, where he had lived as a boy.

McKay left Hollywood to pursue his interest in photography, sculpture, and writing. He exhibited his sculpture at the Museum of Modern Art in New York City, besides holding individual exhibitions. His lifeboat rescue photographs of the Andrea Doria were published internationally.

McKay wrote many plays and novels, and was a literary critic for the Los Angeles Herald Examiner between 1977 and 1982. He taught writing classes at the University of California, Los Angeles, the University of Southern California, the University of Alaska, and the University of Hawaii.

He wrote and co-directed a TV film, Me (1973), for Hollywood Television Theatre on PBS. He wrote a script for another TV movie, Sea Marks (1976), based on his play.

"I'm through with acting," he said in 1976. "I'll never do a series again. I can't. It's a mental mess-up for me. I got all sorts of attention I didn't deserve and I was too sensitive to hear things about myself. People loved me and hated me for absolutely no good reasons."

His play Toyer was produced by the Arena Players Repertory Theater in New York in 1993. Toyer was produced in London at the Arts Theatre in 2009.

His play Sea Marks was produced in New York in 1981 at the Players Theatre; in 2003 at the American Theatre for Actors (Off-Off Broadway), directed by Allen Fitzpatrick and produced by Jonah Productions; and again in 2014, produced Off-Broadway at the Irish Repertory Theatre.

A verse by McKay became the lyrics for the song "Black Bean Soup" sung by the actor and singer David Soul. It was the B-side of the hit single "Don't Give Up on Us". Soul sang it as a duet with actress Lynne Marta. It has sold 1.16 million copies in the UK. It is also part of the soundtrack on two episodes of Soul's TV series Starsky & Hutch. He also has two other co-writing credits on Soul's eponymous debut album, "The Wall" and "Topanga".

== Personal life ==
Gardner bought a wooded property in Beverly Hills and kept a menagerie of animals including lions, cheetahs, dogs, and a monkey which he brought back from his sojourn to South America.

== Awards ==
McKay's awards included three National Endowment for the Arts fellowships for playwriting, the Drama Critics Circle Award for Best Play, and the Sidney Carrington Prize. He was a winner in the Canadian Regional Drama Festival, and runner-up in the Hemingway Short Story Contest.

== Final years and death ==
McKay settled in Hawaii. He died from prostate cancer in 2001 at the age of 69. He was married to Irish painter Madeleine Madigan whom he met in his 40s.

== In popular culture ==
Gardner McKay is mentioned in the 1983 song, "We Are the People Our Parents Warned Us About", by Jimmy Buffett that appeared on his One Particular Harbour album.

== Written works ==
=== Plays ===
- Sea Marks (1972)
- Masters of the Sea (1991)
- This Fortunate Island
- Toyer (1993)
- In Order of Appearance (2003)
- Untold Damage

=== Novels ===
- Toyer (1999)
- The Kinsman (2011)
- Trompe L'Oeil (2015)
- Ten, Bloomsbury Square (2015)

=== Memoir ===
- Journey Without a Map (2013)

=== Short stories ===
- Stories on the Wind: An Anthology of Short Stories (2017)
- Stories on the Wind: Volume 2: An Anthology of Short Stories.
