= Mary, Mary (film) =

1963 film by Mervyn LeRoy

- Directed by: Mervyn LeRoy
- Screenplay by: Richard L. Breen
- Based on: Mary, Mary; 1961 play by Jean Kerr
- Produced by: Mervyn LeRoy
- Starring: Debbie Reynolds; Barry Nelson
- Cinematography: Harry Stradling
- Edited by: David Wages
- Music by: Frank Perkins
- Production company: Warner Bros. Pictures
- Distributed by: Warner Bros. Pictures
- Release date: October 24, 1963 (New York City)
- Running time: 126 minutes
- Country: United States
- Language: English

Mary, Mary is a 1963 Technicolor romantic comedy film directed by Mevyn LeRoy and starring Debbie Reynolds and Barry Nelson as a divorced couple. It is based on the 1961 play of the same name by Jean Kerr.

== Plot ==
When the Internal Revenue Service questions some of Bob McKellaway's deductions, Bob cannot remember what $5,000 worth of checks were for. Without his knowledge, his friend and tax lawyer, Oscar Nelson, asks Bob's soon-to-be ex-wife Mary to come to help identify legitimate business expenses. Bob neither wants to see her nor have his young fiancée Tiffany Richards meet her. Bob is also concerned that his publishing business may not be earning enough money to keep socialite Tiffany in her wealthy lifestyle.

Mary has had a makeover and looks stunning, but old issues quickly resurface, with Bob again resenting Mary's sarcastic sense of humor. Meanwhile, Bob is dealing with rejecting a gossipy memoir by middle-aged movie star Dirk Winston, who jokingly suggests that if Bob publishes his book he can relieve Bob of his alimony burden by marrying Mary. When Dirk asks Mary on a date, Bob accuses Dirk of mercenary motives, and Dirk pointedly questions why Bob is acting jealous. On their date, Dirk quickly picks up on Mary's insecurity and comments that she never learned to appreciate her own worth. Reassuring Mary that he finds her attractive, Dirk invites her to accompany him the next day on his latest film's publicity tour. Mary is initially uncertain, but he convinces her. When Bob learns that Mary has agreed to go off with Dirk, he again questions Dirk's motives. He tells Mary that she is naïve to believe she is on a movie star's level and that Dirk is using her. Mary is angered that Bob is implying that no other man can find her attractive. Dirk accuses Bob of being largely responsible for Mary's insecurity.

A snowstorm aborts Bob and Tiffany's planned weekend trip, and Bob returns to his apartment to spend the night. Mary is also spending the night, since Bob was supposed to be away with Tiffany. Reasoning that he wishes to avoid making the same mistakes with Tiffany, Bob asks Mary why their marriage failed. Marry replies with her usual sarcasm, pointing out that Bob always wants to be logical in situations where it isn't logical to be logical. She then points out that Bob left her without explanation one night when he initiated sex and she was not in the mood. Their exchange reveals to both that each was insecure, harboring doubts that the other truly loved them. They end up quarreling again and Bob storms off, not sleeping in his made-up bed on the sofa (Mary occupies the apartment's only bedroom).

The next morning Tiffany and Mary finally meet. Noting that the sheets on the sofa have not been slept on, Tiffany comments that she believes Mary and Bob slept together out of “force of habit”. When Bob returns, Tiffany tells Bob that she suspects he and Mary still have feelings for each other, but she is still willing to marry Bob. During this discussion, a distracted Bob takes six or so sleeping pills, mistaking them for vitamins. While the amount is not lethal, Tiffany goes off to the pharmacy for an antidote. Wary of Tiffany's lack of jealousy and that Tiffany thinks him capable of such betrayal, Bob has second thoughts about marrying her. A groggy Bob proposes to Mary that they stay married (their divorce will not be final for two weeks), since they know each other's foibles and have learned to appreciate each other. Mary is outraged at his entirely practical reasons, suggesting that he wants to avoid a second failed marriage and alimony to two wives. When Dirk arrives to pick up Mary for their trip, Bob locks Mary in a closet to prevent her from leaving, throwing the key out the window. Mary urges Dirk to leave to keep on schedule. Tiffany breaks their engagement and leaves, knowing Bob is not in love with her. Mary then opens the closet with her key, admitting that she could have left with Dirk, but Bob's foolish actions have proven to her how much he really loves her. Bob and Mary reconcile as Bob falls asleep from the sleeping pills.

== Cast ==
- Debbie Reynolds as Mary McKellaway
- Barry Nelson as Bob McKellaway
- Diane McBain as Tiffany Richards
- Hiram Sherman as Oscar Nelson
- Michael Rennie as Dirk Winston
