= First to Fight (film) =

1967 film by Christian Nyby

- Directed by: Christian Nyby
- Written by: Gene L. Coon
- Produced by: William Conrad; Jimmy Lydon
- Starring: Chad Everett; Marilyn Devin; Dean Jagger
- Cinematography: Harold E. Wellman
- Edited by: George R. Rohrs
- Music by: Fred Steiner
- Production company: William Conrad Productions
- Distributed by: Warner Bros.
- Release date: January 25, 1967
- Running time: 92 minutes
- Country: United States
- Language: English

First to Fight is a 1967 American war film starring Chad Everett, Marilyn Devin, making her film debut, Dean Jagger, Bobby Troup and James Best.

The title of First to Fight was derived from the US military practice of sending in United States Marines first in attacks. The film features an early career appearance by future Academy Award winner Gene Hackman as Sgt. Tweed, already having starring in a breakthrough role in Bonnie and Clyde (1967).

== Plot ==
In 1942, a group of American Marines are attacked by the Japanese in the jungles at Guadalcanal. Staff Sergeant "Shanghai" Jack Conell is the sole survivor of his squad, and when he makes it back to his own lines, he is given a field promotion to Second Lieutenant and awarded the Medal of Honor by Colonel Baseman.

Sent back home on a War Bonds Tour, Connell is reluctant to trade on his heroism and does not consider himself a hero, just a survivor. When he returns home, despite efforts of his friends to find him dates, he falls in love with Peggy Sandford (Marilyn Devin) and the two are married. Her fiancé had been killed, and Peggy extracts a promise from Connell that he will not go back into the war. For that time, he trains new recruits at Camp Pendleton Marine Base, but is emotionally distraught as he comes to think of himself as a slacker and treats his trainees harshly in the belief that they need to be hardened for battle.

With a confrontation with Colonel Baseman who is afraid for him and his mental state, Connell is offered the chance to go back into the lines. He volunteers to return to the fighting, but even with Peggy, now pregnant and fearing for him, releasing him from his promise, Connell finds it difficult to become the warrior he once was. After freezing in combat, he eventually takes charge of his unit and leads them successfully in a raid against a Japanese island stronghold.

== Cast ==
- Chad Everett as SSgt. / 2nd Lt. Jack Connell
- Marilyn Devin as Peggy Sanford
- Dean Jagger as Col. Baseman
- Bobby Troup as Lt. Overman
- Claude Akins as Capt. Mason
- Gene Hackman as Sgt. Tweed
- James Best as Sgt. Carnavan
- Norman Alden as Sgt. Schmidtmer
- Bobs Watson as Sgt. Maypole
- Ken Swofford as O'Brien
- Ray Reese as Hawkins
- Garry Goodgion as Karl
- Robert Austin as Adams
- Clint Ritchie as Sgt. Slater
- Stephen Roberts as Pres. Franklin D. Roosevelt

== Production ==
First to Fight was shot at Camp Pendleton Marine Base, Oceanside, California, and in the San Fernando Valley at the Bell Ranch and Africa U.S.A. Park, a wildlife tourist attraction in Boca Raton, Florida. Most of the equipment matched period pieces from World War II and helped to make the film more authentic.

Footage from Casablanca (1942) was also incorporated in First to Fight.

== Reception ==
First to Fight was notable in the number of major actors who were featured in starring and supporting roles. Although Marilyn Devin would star in only a few films, she went on to a career as a TV news anchor. Chad Everett appearing as one of the last contract actors in Hollywood was ably backed up by Oscar-winner Dean Jagger, and future Oscar-winner Gene Hackman, actor and Jazz singer Bobby Troup, Claude Akins and James Best, both of whom would later find fame as TV stars.
