= Black Gold (1962 film) =

1962 film

- Film poster
- Directed by: Leslie H. Martinson
- Screenplay by: Bob Duncan; Wanda Duncan; Harry Whittington
- Based on: Wyoming Wildcatters; 1950 in Mammoth Western Magazine by Harry Whittington
- Produced by: James Barnett
- Starring: Philip Carey; Diane McBain; James Best; Fay Spain; Claude Akins; William Edward Phipps
- Cinematography: Harold E. Stine
- Edited by: Leo H. Shreve
- Music by: Howard Jackson
- Production company: Warner Bros. Pictures
- Distributed by: Warner Bros. Pictures
- Release date: July 21, 1962
- Running time: 98 minutes
- Country: United States
- Language: English

Black Gold is a 1962 adventure film directed by Leslie H. Martinson and written by Bob Duncan, Wanda Duncan and Harry Whittington. The film stars Philip Carey, Diane McBain, James Best, Fay Spain, Claude Akins and William Edward Phipps.

The film was released by Warner Bros. Pictures on July 21, 1962.

== Plot ==
An Oklahoma farmer discovers oil on his land.

== Cast ==
- Philip Carey as Frank McCandless
- Diane McBain as Ann Evans
- James Best as Jericho Larkin
- Fay Spain as Julie
- Claude Akins as Chick Carrington
- William Edward Phipps as Albert Mailer
- Dub Taylor as Doc
- Ken Mayer as Felker
- Iron Eyes Cody as Charlie Two-Bits
- Vincent Barbi as Klein
- Rusty Wescoatt as Wilkins
