= A Distant Trumpet =

1964 film by Raoul Walsh

- French theatrical release poster
- Directed by: Raoul Walsh
- Written by: Richard Fielder; Albert Beicht (adaptation)
- Screenplay by: John Twist
- Based on: A Distant Trumpet; 1960 novel by Paul Horgan
- Produced by: William H. Wright
- Starring: Troy Donahue; Suzanne Pleshette; William Reynolds
- Cinematography: William H. Clothier
- Edited by: David Wages
- Music by: Max Steiner
- Distributed by: Warner Bros. Pictures
- Release date: May 27, 1964
- Running time: 117 minutes
- Country: United States
- Language: English
- Box office: est. $1,200,000 (US/ Canada); 1,037,484 admissions (France)

A Distant Trumpet is a 1964 American Western film, the last directed by Raoul Walsh. It stars Troy Donahue, Suzanne Pleshette and Diane McBain.

The screenplay by John Twist, Albert Beich and Richard Fielder is based on the 1960 novel of the same name by Paul Horgan.

== Plot ==
In 1883, U.S. Army Cavalry 2nd Lieutenant Matthew Hazard, newly graduated from the United States Military Academy at West Point, New York (on the Hudson River), is assigned to isolated Fort Delivery on the Mexican border of the Arizona Territory in the early 1880s, where he meets 1st Lieutenant Teddy Mainwarring's wife Kitty, whom he later rescues from an Indian attack.

Major General Alexander Quaint, arrives at Fort Delivery to conduct an official inquiry into illegal and prejudicial actions and activities resulting in abuse of persons and destruction and theft of properties perpetuated or authorized by elements of the fort's Command. After the inquiry, General Quaint apologizes to the officers of Fort Delivery for the mock inquiry and proceeds to present his plan to capture Chiricahua Apache chief "War Eagle".

When his efforts to capture Chiricahua Apache chief "War Eagle" fail, he sends Lt. Hazard into northern Mexico to meet the Indian chief to convince him to surrender. After a long arduous trip south across the border in desolate deserts and buttes, canyons with dry ravines, and gulches, Lt. Hazard meets War Eagle and asks him to surrender and return with him on the promise that the Indians will be provided a safe haven at a reservation near their ancient tribal homeland in Arizona. En route back to the fort, they encounter a Major Miller, an officer who rose from the ranks, who was sent to meet the surrendering Indian party and take them into custody as prisoners to be sent instead to exile in Florida.

Lt. Hazard was ordered to report to the Secretary of War in Washington, D.C. at the office of the Secretary of War, Lt. Hazard was presented the Congressional Medal of Honor. Lt. Hazard took this opportunity, to ask the Secretary of War to reverse their decision to send the Chiricahua Apache Indians to Florida and instead implement the promises he made to the Indians that they will be sent to a reservation in Arizona. When the Secretary of War refused Lt. Hazard's request, the latter in front of an assembly of press and family, makes a bold declaration about how the Indians have been betrayed by the United States Army and returned his Medal of Honor and gave his verbal resignation from the Army.

General Quaint also took this occasion to hand in his resignation as a show of solidarity with the protest of Lt. Hazard. Gen. Quaint continued trying to convince the Secretary of War to reverse their decision and allow Lt. Hazard to keep his word to War Eagle. Since the Secretary of War would not budge and instead telephoned the President of the United States of America (Chester A. Arthur) to consult, Gen. Quaint took this opportunity to talk with the President to warn him that there would be trouble with the Indians if the decision of the War Department was not reversed.

The President overruled the Secretary of War and ordered the release of the Indian prisoners. Lt. Hazard was promoted to captain and assigned as the new commanding officer of Fort Delivery. Capt. Hazard and Kitty, the widow of Lt. Teddy Mainwarring, were married.

== Cast ==
- Troy Donahue as 2nd Lt. Matthew Hazard, U.S.A.
- Suzanne Pleshette as Kitty Mainwarring
- William Reynolds as 1st Lt. Teddy Mainwarring, U.S.A.
- James Gregory as Maj. Gen. Alexander Quaint, U.S.A.
- Diane McBain as Laura Frelief
- Claude Akins as Seely Jones – Traveling merchant offering a wagon of prostitutes, dance hall girls, and liquor to isolated military posts.
- Kent Smith as the U.S. Secretary of War (in the Arthur administration)
- Bartlett Robinson as Maj. Hiram Prescott
- Lane Bradford as Maj. Miller
- Judson Pratt as Capt. Cedric Gray, MD
- Russell Johnson as Capt. Brinker
- Richard X. Slattery as 1st Sgt. Fry
- Larry Ward as Sgt. Kroger
- Bobby Bare as Pvt. Cranshaw

== Original novel ==
The film was based on a 629-page novel of the same name by Paul Horgan, published in 1960, which was based on extensive historical research. The New York Times called it "the finest novel yet on the Southwest in its settling." Another reviewer for the same paper called it a "first rate historical novel."

== Production ==
Warners bought the film rights and announced they would make the film in 1960 with James Woolf and Jack Clayton as producer and director, Laurence Harvey as star, and Alan Le May to do the script. It would be made for Challet Productions, Harvey's production company.

Burt Kennedy wrote a draft of the script; he was under contract to Warners at the time and called the novel "wonderful". Then Clayton was replaced by Leslie H. Martinson. Eventually, the film was set up with an entirely new producer, director, and writer.

Significant changes were made from Horgan's novel in reversing the character traits of the female leads, making Kitty Mainwarring the object of Hazard's affections and Laura the negative personality; and altering the narrative's climax (and history), by reversing the fate of the Apaches from their historic removal to Florida and restoring the male protagonists to full duty, thereby negating Hazard's point-of-honor refusal of the congressional Medal of Honor and resignation from the Army, which was the basis for the entire storyline.

Shooting took place in September 1963. Location filming occurred in Flagstaff, Arizona and Gallup, New Mexico.

== Critical reception ==
In his review in The New York Times, Bosley Crowther called the film:

A deadly bore...so dull you even lose interest in watching the horses and the stunt men doing their stuff...Seldom has there been a Western picture on which so much money was spent...from which so little excitement, energy or colorfulness exudes. It's as though Mr. Walsh and everybody were bitten by tsetse flies and went through the business of shooting the picture in a state of drowsiness."

Variety said:

The stunning location terrain of the Red Rocks area of New Mexico and Arizona's Painted Desert gives the production a tremendous pictorial lift. Max Steiner's score is a driving dramatic force but the use of the main theme seems a trifle excessive. The picture would benefit from a lot more pruning by editor David Wages.

Time Out New York feels that despite "an average script and a colourless lead performance from Donahue" the film "[emerges] as a majestically simple, sweeping cavalry Western, a little reminiscent of Ford in mood and manner. Brilliantly shot by William Clothier, it tends to have its cake and eat it by indulging in a spectacular massacre before introducing the liberal message, but still goes further than most in according respect to the Indian by letting him speak his own language (with subtitles)."

Peter Bogdanovich called the film:

One of Walsh's weakest pictures, caused mainly by an intolerably bad cast and a predictable script. Whenever the director is allowed to linger on shots of horses and riders, Indians and cavalry, and on their battles, he shows his vitality, personality and strength. Otherwise, his efforts are hopeless against the talentless players and the hopeless words they are required to speak.

== See also ==
- List of American films of 1964
