= Ice Palace (film) =

1960 film by Vincent Sherman

- Directed by: Vincent Sherman
- Written by: Harry Kleiner
- Based on: Ice Palace by Edna Ferber
- Produced by: Henry Blanke and Harry Kleiner
- Starring: Richard Burton; Robert Ryan; Carolyn Jones; Martha Hyer; Jim Backus
- Cinematography: Joseph F. Biroc
- Edited by: William H. Ziegler
- Music by: Max Steiner
- Production company: Warner Bros. Pictures
- Distributed by: Warner Bros. Pictures
- Release date: January 2, 1960 (United States)
- Running time: 143 minutes
- Country: United States
- Language: English
- Budget: $3.5 million
- Box office: $1,650,000 (US/ Canada)

Ice Palace is a 1960 American historical drama film directed by Vincent Sherman and adapted from a novel of 1958 written by Edna Ferber. The film stars Richard Burton, Robert Ryan, Carolyn Jones and Martha Hyer. It dramatizes the debate over Alaska statehood. Alaska had become a state in 1959.

== Plot ==
The film tells the story of Zeb Kennedy and Thor Storm, Alaska settlers in the period following World War I. Kennedy works his way up through the Alaskan fish cannery business, befriending Wang, a Chinese worker, and Storm, an idealistic fishing boat captain. Kennedy and Storm begin to plan a cannery together in the Alaskan town of Baranof, when Kennedy falls for Bridie Ballantyne, Storm's fiancée. The feeling is reciprocated, but Kennedy chooses money over love, marrying Seattle heiress Dorothy Wendt. When Storm discovers his disappointed fiancée's infidelity, he punches out Kennedy and flees into the wilderness on a dog sled.

Kennedy launches a packing company in Baranof, hiring Wang as well as his old friend, Dave Husack. His feelings for Ballantyne, now abandoned by her fiancé, are no secret to his wife. The Kennedys give birth to a daughter, Grace. Storm returns to Baranof with an infant son, Christopher, born to an Eskimo wife who died after labor. Over the following years, Storm comes to resent Kennedy for his cannery's use of salmon traps, which are depleting the salmon population and putting fishermen out of business. Meanwhile, their children, Christopher and Grace, begin a romance. Kennedy tells Storm to keep his "half-breed kid" away from his daughter. Storm, drawing on the support of fishermen and Alaska natives, becomes a candidate for the Alaska Territorial Legislature on a platform advocating statehood and opposing the excesses of business mogul "Czar" Kennedy. Christopher and Grace elope to live among Christopher's maternal relations in the village of Anavak. Grace's mother, Dorothy Kennedy dies.

Grace becomes pregnant and the young couple decides to make a journey to Baranof so that the child is born there. They set off by dog sled, but Grace begins labor en route and Christopher is waylaid by a bear and killed. Grace's father, Zeb, along with Thor and "Aunt" Bridie, intercept and shoot the bear. Grace gives birth to a baby girl, Christine, before she dies. Christine grows up between the houses of Ballantyne and her feuding grandfathers, Kennedy and Storm. Kennedy grooms Dave Husack's son, Bay, to be his champion in the territorial legislature. He encourages the young lawyer to marry Christine for political advantage. Ballantyne discovers and exposes the plot, and the engagement is broken.

Storm flies to Juneau, but is forced by a snowstorm to make a crash landing on a glacier. Ballantyne prevails on Kennedy to make a risky flight to save Storm and his pilot, an Eskimo named Ross Guildenstern. Storm survives, and his speeches before Congress are decisive in winning approval for Alaska's statehood. Victorious, Storm gives a conciliatory radio address, thanking erstwhile statehood opponent Kennedy.

== Cast ==
- Richard Burton as Zeb Kennedy
- Robert Ryan as Thor Storm
- Carolyn Jones as Bridie Ballantyne
- Martha Hyer as Dorothy Wendt Kennedy
- Jim Backus as Dave Husack
- Ray Danton as Bay Husack
- Diane McBain as Christine Storm
- Karl Swenson as Scotty Ballantyne
- Shirley Knight as Grace Kennedy
- Barry Kelley as Einer Wendt
- Sheridan Comerate as Ross Guildenstern
- George Takei as Wang
- Steve Harris as Christopher Storm

== Production ==
=== Original novel ===
Ice Palace was Edna Ferber's first novel in five years. Ferber spent four years researching and writing it, beginning the project in 1954. She visited Alaska several times over the following years, often with the assistance of Ernest Gruening. The character of Kennedy was based on Austin Lathrop; the Bridie Ballantyne was based on Eva McGown. The Ice Palace itself was a composite of actual buildings in Alaska. Baranof, the novel's main fictional setting, was based on the Alaskan town of Fairbanks.

Ferber later said she felt as though she finished the novel "a month too early" because of her ill health. She had suffered a car accident and a recurrence of neuralgia and decided to send it for publication instead of doing another draft. "I felt if I didn't finish the book I would never be able to write again," she later said.

The novel was published in March 1958. The Los Angeles Times said it was "not one of her better works". However it became a best seller, and is thought to have contributed to Alaska becoming a state in 1959.

=== Development ===
In December 1957, Warner Bros. Pictures bought the film rights to the novel for $350,000 plus 15% of the profits. Warners had already had a success with a 1956 adaptation of another Edna Ferber novel, Giant. One person associated with the film later called Ice Palace "Giant-on-the-rocks".

Warners obtained rights under a twelve-year lease, with rights to revert to Ferber after that. (A later source said the cost was $225,000 plus 15% of the profits.

Jo and Arthur Napoleon were originally assigned the job of writing the script.

In July 1959 it was announced Richard Burton and Robert Ryan would star, and Vincent Sherman would direct.

Ice Palace was the motion picture debut of George Takei and Diane McBain. McBain had recently been put under contract to Warners and appeared in some of their TV shows.

=== Shooting ===
Filming started in August 1959. There was background filming at Mendenhall Glacier, ten days filming at Petersberg on Mitkof Island and Juneau, and three days of filming at Fairbanks. There was so little snow the unit was forced to return to Alaska.

== Reception ==
Ice Palace was a commercial and critical failure. A Ferber biography described it as "glacial at the box office." The New York Times reviewer called it "as false and synthetic a screen saga as has rolled out of a color camera" and "no more authentic than cornstarch snow on a studio set."

Sheila Toomey of the Anchorage Daily News, writing in 1996 about the Northward Building in downtown Fairbanks and its lore relative to the film, wrote "But in 1958 the Northward, a hulking steel-sided apartment complex, was immortalized in a bad novel, followed by an even worse movie, both called The Ice Palace".

== See also ==
- List of American films of 1960
