= Steve Trilling =

Steve Trilling (October 2, 1902, New York City – May 28, 1964, Los Angeles) was a Hollywood executive, best known for being second in command to Jack L. Warner at Warner Bros in the 1940s through to 1960s. He replaced Hal Wallis after Wallis left the studio, although Trilling had less power than Wallis.

Trilling joined Warner when it acquired Stanley Theatres in 1928. He was a casting director before becoming Jack Warner's executive assistant. In 1942 when Warner went into the army, Trilling ran the studio on Warner's behalf. Trilling became an associate executive producer in 1951 and a vice president in 1957.

Trilling was replaced by William T. Orr as head of the movie making division in 1961. He was fired from Warner in 1964. Shortly after his departure from Warner Bros., Trilling, suffering from heart trouble, was reported to have died in his sleep, on May 28, 1964. Film historian David Thomson, however, claims without citation in his book Warner Bros: The Making of an American Movie Studio that Trilling committed suicide.

Producer David Lewis recalled Trilling "had a flair for unusual casting. I liked him enormously and although the law at Warners was to use the stock company at all times, he was somehow able to get the best outsiders when the situation demanded. He was especially adept at casting good people when budget restrictions threatened to dictate otherwise."
