= Chad Everett =

American actor (1937–2012)

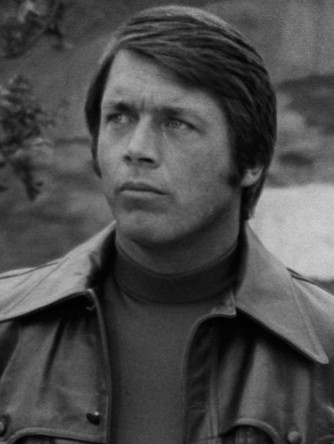
- Everett in 1975
- Born: Raymon Lee Cramton; June 11, 1937; South Bend, Indiana, U.S.
- Died: July 24, 2012 (aged 75); Los Angeles, California, U.S.
- Other names: Chas Everett; Chad York
- Education: Fordson High School, Wayne State University
- Occupation: Actor
- Years active: 1959–2012
- Spouse: Shelby Grant (m. 1966; died 2011)
- Children: 3, including Dale Scott

Raymon Lee Cramton (June 11, 1937 – July 24, 2012), known professionally as Chad Everett, was an American actor who appeared in more than 40 films and television series. He played Dr. Joe Gannon in the television drama Medical Center, which aired from 1969 to 1976.

== Early life ==
Everett was born to Virdeen Ruth Hopper and Harry Clyde Cramton. His father was a racecar driver as well as a racing mechanic and an auto parts salesman. Some confusion existed regarding the year of his birth. According to The Washington Post, "many reference sources list Mr. Everett's date of birth as 1936, but legal records indicate he was born one year later. He routinely gave his age as consistent with a birth date in 1937." His name was later changed to Chad Everett by his agent Henry Willson.

Everett said he did not mind the change because he was tired of explaining his real name: "Raymon-no-D, Cramton-no-P." He was raised in Dearborn, Michigan, where he attended Fordson High School. While there, he played on the football team as a quarterback and began acting in stage plays at age 14. During his junior year at Wayne State University in Detroit, he joined a State Department–sponsored acting troupe that toured India. "I went into acting because I'm easily bored", Everett once said. "Acting seemed to give vent to a lot of different feelings." He graduated from WSU with a degree in drama.

== Career ==
=== Acting ===
In 1961, Everett signed a seven-year contract to MGM.

Everett's first notable role came in an episode of the 1960-1962 detective series Surfside 6. His first major role came a year later in the film Claudelle Inglish, and he played a deputy in the short-lived 1963 ABC Western television series The Dakotas. After appearing in a number of movies and television series in the later 1960s, he got his big break, landing the role of Dr. Joe Gannon on the medical drama Medical Center, with costar James Daly.

He appeared in numerous films and television series, including The Singing Nun, Centennial, Hagen, Airplane II: The Sequel, Star Command, and Mulholland Drive. He also appeared as a guest star in more than 40 television series such as Redigo; Melrose Place; The Nanny; Touched by an Angel; Diagnosis: Murder; Caroline in the City; Murder, She Wrote; The Red Skelton Show; The Man from U.N.C.L.E.; and Route 66.

In 1986, Everett's star on the Hollywood Walk of Fame was unveiled.

In 1987, Everett supplied the voice of Ultraman Chuck in the English version of the animated movie Ultraman: The Adventure Begins and voiced several characters in the animated television series The New Yogi Bear Show. He hosted Trinity Broadcasting Network's Master's Theater. He was selected by the family of John Wayne to be the voice of the audio-animatronic figure of Wayne in Disney's Hollywood Studios' The Great Movie Ride. Based on Patrick Wayne's suggestion, Everett also provided the voice of Wayne in a scene that only appears in the VHS version of Gremlins 2: The New Batch (replacing the Hulk Hogan scene that appeared in the theatrical and DVD versions).

In 2001, Everett played one brief scene with Naomi Watts in David Lynch's Mulholland Drive. Salon online magazine cited this scene as "the heart of the movie".

=== Writing ===
Everett authored and self-published a book of romantic poetry, which he dedicated to wife Shelby Grant.

=== Singing ===
He recorded a couple of albums, including All Strung Out in 1971, for Marina, by MGM covering Ain't No Sunshine.

=== Philanthropy ===
For many years, Everett co-hosted the Labor Day Jerry Lewis Telethon, which raises money and awareness for and about the affliction of muscular dystrophy.

== Personal life ==
Everett married actress Shelby Grant in Tucson, Arizona on May 22, 1966. Everett was on location in Tucson filming the 1967 movie Return of the Gunfighter at the time of their wedding. They had two daughters, Katherine and Shannon. The couple remained married for 45 years until her death after a brain aneurysm on June 25, 2011. Everett credited his family with being a stabilizing force in his life, stating that even in the worst of times, Grant "never threatened to leave. She would tell me that she was there for me. If not for my family, I would have been in big trouble." Grant noted his romanticism; he sent her so many flowers during their courtship that "my balcony looked like a burial ground." He also often wrote sentimental poems to Grant throughout their marriage, as well as to his daughters. The couple renewed their marriage vows every seven years.

After Medical Center ended, Everett became frustrated when no movie roles were forthcoming and television roles were not working out. A long-time social drinker, he began drinking heavily. He was consuming a quart of vodka a day by the time he quit drinking in 1986. "I was a functional alcoholic." Shelby noted his alcohol-related mood swings and has said, "[F]inally I confronted him. I came into the bedroom with a big pot of coffee one morning and said 'we have a major problem to deal with here.'" A month later, Everett caught sight of himself on a video and did not like what he saw. "'Finally,' I said, 'I am really in trouble'. I stepped outside and I looked up and said 'Father, you take it. I can't handle it anymore.'" The next day, he told his daughters (who were living at home at the time), "I am addicted to alcohol, and I am not going away to detox. I am going to do it here so that you can see what happens to someone if you let a substance take control of you." He attended his first Alcoholics Anonymous meeting the next day and claimed he never drank again, attributing his discipline to his Christian faith and his self-pride.

During an appearance on The Dick Cavett Show that aired on March 31, 1972, Everett pretended to gift a pair of panties to fellow guest Lily Tomlin, a joking reference to a story she'd told earlier. Later in the interview, Everett listed his animals as "three horses and three dogs and a wife." When Cavett prompted Everett to "think about the billing order" of his statement, Everett reiterated that his wife was "the most beautiful animal I own," causing Tomlin to walk off the set.

Beginning in 1973, actress Sheila Scott initiated court proceedings against Everett three times, claiming her son Dale (born earlier that year) was fathered by him. The lengthy and complicated paternity suit ended in 1984 when a California Court of Appeals ruled in favor of Everett. The court stated:

"From the evidence adduced, the jury concluded that Everett was not Dale's father despite the 94.67 percent probability of paternity from the HLA test"... "In this appeal, we affirm a judgment following a jury verdict finding the defendant and respondent not to be the father of the minor child."

Everett refused to take any more tests regarding paternity. He entered into a private financial settlement with Scott in 1973, but steadfastly maintained he was not Dale's father. In 1991, Scott was sentenced to three months' probation following a guilty verdict of "harassing" Everett for 18 years, including death threats against him and his wife. She was ordered to undergo psychological testing and never to publicly declare that Everett was Dale's father.

== Death ==
Everett died on July 24, 2012, at his home in Los Angeles of lung cancer. He was 75 years old.

== TV and filmography ==
- Claudelle Inglish (1961) as Linn Varner
- Lawman (1961, TV series) as Cole Herod / Jim Austin
- 77 Sunset Strip (1962, TV series) as Ross / Anthony Chase / Mark Adams
- Rome Adventure (1962) as Young Man
- The Chapman Report (1962) as Bob Jensen
- The Dakotas (1962–63, TV series) as Deputy Del Stark
- Get Yourself a College Girl (1964) as Gary Underwood
- Branded (1965, TV series) as Adam Manning / Tad Manning
- Combat! (1965, TV series) as Steve Kovac
- Made in Paris (1966) as Ted Barclay
- The Singing Nun (1966) as Robert Gerarde
- Johnny Tiger (1966) as Johnny Tiger
- First to Fight (1967) as Sergeant Jack Connell
- Return of the Gunfighter (1967) as Lee Sutton
- The Last Challenge (1967) as 'Lot' McGuire
- The F.B.I. (1968) as Daniel Sayers
- The Impossible Years (1968) as Richard Merrick
- Medical Center (1969–1976, TV series) as Dr. Joe Gannon
- Ironside (1969, TV series) as Larry Van Druten
- The Firechasers (1971) as Quentin Barnaby
- Give Me My Money (1977)
- Centennial (1978–79, TV mini-series) as Major Maxwell Mercy
- The French Atlantic Affair (1979, TV mini-series) as Harold Columbine
- Hagen (1980, TV Series) as Paul Hagen
- The Intruder Within (1981, TV movie) as Jake Nevins
- Airplane II: The Sequel (1982) as Simon Kurtz
- Madame's Place (1982, TV series) as Himself
- The Rousters (1983–84, TV series) as Wyatt Earp III
- Malibu (1983, TV movie) as Art Bonnell
- Fever Pitch (1985) as The Dutchman
- Murder, She Wrote (1986–1993, TV series) as Martin Fraser / Clark Blanchard / Lieutenant Redick / Kevin Keats
- The Jigsaw Murders (1989) as Sergeant Joe DaVonzo
- Thunderboat Row (1989, TV movie) as Ben Bishop
- Heroes Stand Alone (1989) as Zack Duncan
- McKenna (1994–1995, TV series) as Jack McKenna
- Cybill (1995, TV series) as David Whittier Sr.
- Star Command (1996, TV movie) as Commander Shane Ridnaur
- Touched by an Angel (1997, episode: "Crisis of Faith") as Reverend Daniel Brewer
- Diagnosis: Murder (1997, episode: 'Physician, Murder Thyself') as Dr. Clayton Andrews
- When Time Expires (1997, TV movie) as Walter Kelly, June's Father
- Just Shoot Me (1997, TV series) as Tom Youngerman
- Melrose Place (1998, TV series) as Thomas Sterling
- The Nanny (1998, TV series) as Dr. Osborn
- Psycho (1998) as Tom Cassidy
- Free Fall (1999) as Richard Pierce
- Manhattan, AZ (2000, TV series) as Jake Manhattan
- Mulholland Drive (2001) as Jimmy Katz
- Frank McKlusky, C.I. (2002) as Doctor (uncredited)
- View from the Top (2003) as Jack Weston (uncredited)
- Tiptoes (2003) as Kirk
- Wake Up, Ron Burgundy: The Lost Movie (2004) as Jess Moondragon (cameo)
- The Mountain (2005) as Toby (pilot)
- E-Ring (2006, TV series) as Army Chief of Staff General Long
- Cold Case (2006, episode: "Forever Blue") as Jimmy Bruno
- Unspoken (2006) as Narrator
- Without a Trace (2007, episode: "Skin Deep") as Joseph Pratt
- The Pink Conspiracy (2007) as Dr. Redbush
- Break (2008) as The Man
- Supernatural (2009, episode: "The Curious Case of Dean Winchester") as Old Dean Winchester
- Undercovers (2010–2012, TV series) as Professor Joseph Shilling
- No Clean Break (2011, TV series) as The Man
- Chemistry (2011, TV series) as Victor 'Vic' Strathmore
- Castle (2012, TV series) as Jerry Maddox
