= List of Hawaiian Eye episodes =

The following is a list of episodes for the Hawaiian Eye detective series. The American television series ran on the American Broadcasting Company 1959–1963.

Private investigator Tracy Steele (Anthony Eisley) and his half-Hawaiian partner, Tom Lopaka (Robert Conrad), own Hawaiian Eye, a combination detective agency and private security firm, located in Honolulu, Hawaii. Their principal client is the Hawaiian Village Hotel, which in exchange for security services, provides the agency with a luxurious private compound on the hotel grounds.

The partners investigate mysteries and protect clients with the sometime help of photographer Cricket Blake (Connie Stevens), who also sings at the hotel's Shell Bar, and a ukulele-playing cab driver Kim Quisado (Poncie Ponce), who has "relatives" throughout the islands. Engineer turned detective Greg McKenzie (Grant Williams), joins the agency later on as a full partner, while hotel social director Philip Barton (Troy Donahue) lends a hand after Tracy Steele departs.

== Series overview ==
Season	Episodes	Originally released	
Season	Episodes	First released	Last released
1	33	October 7, 1959	May 25, 1960
2	38	September 14, 1960	May 31, 1961
3	39	September 27, 1961	June 20, 1962
4	24	October 2, 1962	April 2, 1963

== Episodes ==
=== Season 1 (1959–60) ===
No. overall	No. in season	Title	Directed by	Written by	Original release date
1	1	"Malihini Holiday"	Howard W. Koch	Story by : Juanita Sheridan; Teleplay by : Robert J. Shaw	October 7, 1959
Also spelled as "Malahini" it is the Hawaiian word for "newcomer". After two suspicious near-fatal accidents, Mavis Purcell (Patricia Driscoll) says her husband Peter (Duncan Lamont) might be trying to kill her. Tracy Steel and Tom Lopaka of the Hawaiian Eye detective agency investigate. Tracy believes Mavis planned everything. Guest stars: Bill Garrison (Ross Elliott) writes books for children, Michael Thompson (Ed Kemmer), Peggy Garrison (Tracey Roberts), David Kimu (Sal Ponti), Lala Kealoha (Pilar Seurat)
2	2	"Waikiki Widow"	Leslie H. Martinson	Teleplay by : Lowell Barrington; From a Novel by : Juanita Sheridan	October 14, 1959
The grandson of Tseung (Hsi Tseng Tsiang) has been working as a house boy, and is murdered. Tom and Tracy are hired to find out who killed him. Rev. Matthew Webster (Robert McQueeney) honorably served more than a decade in China, and smuggled a string of pearls out of China. Tseung then hired the widow Lady Blanche Carleton (Paula Raymond) to smuggle the pearls into Hawaii. The big question is the authenticity of the pearls. Tracy takes Crickett to meet with Pappa Haone (Michael Raffetto). Guest stars: Dan Gordon (Myron Healey), John Hunter (Karl Weber), Sally Tseung (Judy Dan), Paul, MC (Andre Philippe) Marie (Rennette Wright)
3	3	"Second Day of Infamy"	Howard W. Koch	Steven Ritch	October 21, 1959
The title is a reference to President Franklin Roosevelt's Day of Infamy speech responding to the Attack on Pearl Harbor. Tracy Steele is on the trail of former Japanese spy and escaped mental patient Mitsuki (Yuki Shimoda) who is deluded, believing he in living in the year 1941, that the attack on Pearl Harbor is imminent and that he is a key operative who will set it off. Tracy must find him as soon as possible to avert a catastrophe. Miiko Taka appears as Sumiko.
4	4	"All Expenses Paid"	Charles F. Haas	Robert J. Shaw	October 28, 1959
Marian Summers (Karen Steele) is registered at the Hawaiian Village Hotel. Tom Lopaka falls in love with her. She feels the same way but cannot reciprocate because of her mobster boyfriend on the mainland. Miller Kincaid (Anthony George) stalks her to make sure she won't talk about her boyfriend's business. Her arrival also seems to trigger a series of hotel burglaries, which she believes are carried out by Miller Kincaid.
5	5	"Dangerous Eden"	Edward Dein	Robert C. Dennis	November 4, 1959
Temperamental actress Martha Gregory (Audrey Totter) is filming in Hawaii. Mack Stanley (Jackie Coogan) wants to hire Tracy Steele to work for them to frame actress Kay Laniel (Myrna Fahey) for something that assistant director David Evarts (Malcolm Atterbury) says never happened. When Martha's reckless driving kills a pedestrian, David is an eyewitness and blackmails her. Martha unexpectedly tells Tracy to drop his investigation. At David's house, Tracy witnesses his murder, and is almost run over by a car. Tom Lopaka fills in for Cricket and sings "I've Got a Crush On You" in the lounge showroom.
6	6	"Cloud Over Koala"	William J. Hole, Jr.	Teleplay by : Louis Pelletier; Based on a Radio Play by : Stanley Niss	November 11, 1959
Real-estate agent John Peralta (Lou Krugman) hires Tom Lopaka and Tracy Steele to find William Vedder (Jack Orrison) so he can get his signature and close a land swindle in the works. Peralta has two high-priced life insurance policies that make him more valuable dead than alive. Peggy McLane (Joanna Moore) is paid $10,000 by Cliff Johnson (Don Gordon) to romance Alfred Holland (Maurice Manson) into marrying her. After Peggy pressures Cliff as to what is expected after the marriage, he indicates Alfred would be murdered.
7	7	"Beach Boy"	Andre deToth	Robert J. Shaw	November 18, 1959
Although raised by beach boy Fiji (Robert Warwick), Petero (Troy Donahue) has distant memories that convince him the wealthy Donna Lane (Anna Lee) is his mother. As a child, Petero's step-father Carlton Lane (Robert Lowery) and his mistress Omori (Faith Domergue) gave him away to Fiji, later telling Donna that Petero had drowned, apparently without a corpse or police investigation to prove it. Carlton and Omori plan to kill Petero and Donna, leaving Carlton as the heir to the fortune. When their plot fails, Fiji steps forward and reveals Petero's true heritage. Note: in the series final 1962–1963 season, Troy Donahue was brought on board as hotel social director Philip Barton
8	8	"Three Tickets to Lani"	Robert Altman	Story by : Day Keene; Teleplay by : Day Keene & Dwight Babcock	November 25, 1959
Los Angeles 77 Sunset Strip private detective Stu Bailey (Efrem Zimbalist Jr.) tracks a con artist to Hawaii, and asks Tom and Tracy for help. Hawaiian Eye's investigation leads to a bogus travel agency that's nothing more than a front for a swindle racket. The victims are married men who are lured in by beautiful women. Not wanting their wives to know, the victims are reluctant to press charges. Jack Ferris (Robert Knapp) is running the scam, which often ends in murder. Martin Fawcett (Alex Gerry) checks into the hotel, carrying an estimated $41,000 in cash, making him a prime target for the scam. Anita Callahan (June Blair) is the bait.
9	9	"The Quick Return"	Edward Dein	Story by : Stanley Niss & Robert C. Dennis; Teleplay by : Robert C. Dennis	December 2, 1959
A stolen dossier on a murdered business man contains incriminating evidence about important public figures in Hawaii. Guest stars: George Nolen (Adam West), Jerry Jackson (Harry Jackson), Alma Jackson (Patricia Huston), Celia Lewin (Carol Ohmart), Victor Shaw (Hugh Sanders), Charles Germaine (Tol Avery), Roy Hondine (Rush Williams)
10	10	"Secret of the Second Door"	Paul Stewart	Teleplay by : Ed Jurist; From a Novel by : Robert Colby	December 9, 1959
Hotel owner Archibald Chu Sin (Victor Sen Yung) asks Tom Lopaka to quieten noisy gambling upstairs. Gambler Paul Cummins is murdered, and his widow Connie (Christine White) hires Tom to find his winnings. He believes the game was a front for a larger operation, involving Sortino (Harry Bartell) and Meegham (James McCallion). Archibald sends Tom to Angelina (Jane Chang)'s hotel, to find money stored in a freezer compartment and labeled as fish. Sortino attempts to steal the money, but is murdered by Connie who is quickly arrested.
11	11	"Shipment from Kihei"	Paul Stewart	Story by : Stanley Niss; Teleplay by : Robert J. Shaw	December 16, 1959
Rancher Bart Harrison (Gerald Mohr) at Kihei on the island of Maui hires Tracy to find who and why his cattle are being stolen on their way to market. Tom Lopaka signs on as a Hawaiian cowboy (paniola) to see what's going on. Local businessman Fred Noble (Mark Roberts) is married to Bart's former lover Emily (Joan Vohs). Because of the past relationship, Bart suspects Fred of the cattle theft, after Fred finds a set of altered bookkeeping records, and believes he's being framed. Tracy suspects that Fred and foreman Jose Kosster (H.M. Wynant) might be partners in the cattle thefts.
12	12	"A Dime a Dozen"	Andre DeToth	Robert J. Shaw	December 23, 1959
David Blair (Donald May), keeps the combination to a military safe in his wallet. He and Lynn (Shirley Knight) have fallen in love, in spite of his engagement to Rikki Whitman (Joanna Barnes). His wallet is stolen, but the cash returned to the guard gate. The next morning, the safe is missing $9,000. Rikki learns that he is confined to quarters pending the outcome of an investigation carried out by Tracy Steele. Rikki dumps David and pursues Tracy, who is not interested in her. Dan Holt (Wayne Heffley) is the one who took the wallet and robbed the safe. Once the money is recovered, Rikki attempts to reconnect with David, but he chooses to remain with Lynn.
13	13	"The Koa Man"	Paul Stewart	Story by : Ed Adamson; Teleplay by : Elihu Winer	December 30, 1959
During the 1950-53 Korean War, Tracy Steele served with Harry Gulliver (Adam Williams), who was put on trial for an act of cowardice endangering American military. Tracy is now hired by a Los Angeles law firm to find Gulliver's fiancee Nancy Campbell (Suzanne Storrs). She went into hiding after another of his acts of cowardice abandoned her to roadside carjackers. In Hawaii, she has been working under another name as an instructor for dance studio owner Susan Chang (BarBara Luna). Susan alerts Tracy when she senses Nancy is in imminent danger.
14	14	"Stamped for Danger"	Paul Stewart	Teleplay by : Robert C. Dennis; From a novel by : Emmett McDowell	January 6, 1960
Princess Aysha / Vera Kirkland (Ruta Lee) hires Tracy Steele to deliver a $10,000 batch of envelopes with rare Hawaiian missionary stamps on them. Edward DeLong (John Litel) makes a bid of $40,000 for the stamps if the princess herself will deliver them to him. Ahmed (Jay Novello) is trying to locate the princess, but is murdered at the same time the envelopes go missing. Tracy believes DeLong murdered Ahmed to steal the stamps.
15	15	"The Kamehameha Cloak (ʻAhu ʻula)"	William J. Hole, Jr.	Day Keene & Dwight Babcock	January 13, 1960
Tracy is hired to protect a man from an ancient death curse. Also see: ʻAhuʻula of King Kamehameha I Guest stars: Jim Symington (Robert Colbert), Dr. Eliot (Jack Buetel), May Caldwell (Kathleen Crowley), Ames Caldwell (Tris Coffin), Lanakila (Paul Picerni), Pauline (Susan Crane), Dr. Abner Moses Good (Wendell Holmes)
16	16	"The Kikiki Kid"	Andre DeToth	Robert J. Shaw	January 20, 1960
Nightclub singer Buddy Keene (John Gabriel) aims to be a success by any means necessary. Cab driver Kim Quisano (Poncie Ponce) calls him "a big kikiki", a phony, after witnessing Keene's stunt of throwing himself under the vehicle of unsuspecting columnist Karen Ward (Jean Byron). As a representative of the hotel, Tom Lopaka requires Keene to sign a waiver relieving the hotel of any damages. Ward is flattered by Keene's attentions, and accepts his marriage proposal. Lopaka's investigation turns up Keene's current wife Ellie (Myrna Hansen) who shows Lopaka her husband's collection of clippings on Ward. When Ellie refuses him a divorce, Keene attempts to murder her.
17	17	"Then There Were Three"	William J. Hole, Jr.	Story by : Gibson Fox; Teleplay by : Ken Englund & Gibson Fox	January 27, 1960
Heiress Mary Moore (Nancy Gates) arrives in Hawaii with a group of friends. Sole heir to a private island, and $1,000,000, her attorney Jack Earl (Don Dubbins) secretly flies her to the island. Opal Jensen (Kathleen Freeman) and Cricket Blake (Connie Stevens) suspect kidnapping. Shortly thereafter, Moore's cousin Dennis MacIntosh dies of heart failure induced by a diabetic coma, which some suspect was engineered by Big Jim MacIntosh (Sam Buffington), her cousin from Scotland. Mary elopes with Jack, who admits he's marrying her for the estate.
18	18	"Sword of the Samurai"	Jesse Hibbs	Story by : Gibson Fox; Teleplay by : Ed Jurist	February 3, 1960
Hiroshi Kawagani (George Takei) vows to avenge the seppuku death of his father. Noburu (Teru Shimada) was supposed to finish the ritual, but did not. Hiroshi hires Tom Lopaka, claiming Noburu is just an old family friend. Noburu tells Tom the full story. Meanwhile, Hiroshi becomes attracted to Noburu's daughter, night club singer Michiko (BarBara Luna), and can't bring himself to kill her father.
19	19	"Hong Kong Passage"	Charles Haas	Robert J. Shaw	February 10, 1960
On a return trip from Hong Kong, Tracy's plane is hijacked by Key (James Hong), Jason Plain (Whit Bissel), and Barney Mitchell (Robert Gist). Tom Lopaka and Cricket in Hawaii are on edge after hearing the news. On board the hijacked plane is Tracy's old girlfriend Lisa Barton (Merry Anders), who was being extradited from Hong Kong to Seattle, Washington. Unless Tracy cooperates with the hijackers, they will begin killing passengers.
20	20	"Cut of Ice"	Charles Haas	Story by : Steven Ritch; Teleplay by : Ed Jurist and Steven Ritch	February 17, 1960
Hawaiian Eye is on the edge when a $500,000 diamond entrusted to Tracy Steele and Tom Lopaka disappears at the airport. Cab driver Kim becomes the fall guy for the robbery when early reports point to him as having driven the get-away car for the thieves, and his bank account suddenly shows an unexplained deposit of $2,000. Tracy and Tom believe Kim is innocent, but he goes into hiding as the investigation continues. Security guard Moke (Douglas Mossman) uncovers an important clue when he discovers that Hawaiian Eye's receptionist Alice Thomas (Roberta Haynes) fabricated her past employment references.
21	21	"Fatal Cruise"	Andre DeToth	Robert J. Shaw	February 24, 1960
Tom is hired by Ginger Martin (Shirley Knight) to check up on her husband Johnny (Gary Conway). Tom finds him working as the captain of Verna Collins' (Kasey Rogers) yacht, hoping to build a nest egg to make life easier for Ginger. Verna's husband Greg Collins (Richard Crane) wants to marry pottery artist Tiki (Linda Lawson). Greg drugs Verna's wine and then smothers her with a pillow. When Johnny reports finding her body, he becomes the suspect.
22	22	"Danger on Credit"	Robert B. Sinclair	Story by : Hugh Benson & Jim Barnett; Teleplay by : Lowell Barrington	March 2, 1960
Somerset Jones (Gary Vinson) is a young mainland tourist who wants to impress Cricket. When a waiter mistakenly hands him a credit card belonging to newlyweds Lois Brindisi (Suzanne Lloyd) and Victor Brindisi (John Baer), he uses it on dates with Cricket. Unfortunately, the newlyweds are being stalked through credit card charges by hit man Arnie Padilla (Theodore Marcuse) who was hired by a man Lois rejected. Tom Lopaka brings in Honolulu Police Department Lt. Danny Quon (Mel Prestidge) when the situation looks deadly.
23	23	"Bequest of Arthur Goodwin"	Everett Sloan	Story by : Jack Dillon; Teleplay by : Gibson Fox & Sam Ross	March 9, 1960
Amelia Goodwin (Fay Wray) refuses to give her husband Arthur (Al Hodge) a divorce to marry his secretary Marta Willis (Andrea King) whom most people believe helped build the company business. In anger, Amelia points a gun at Arthur on the stairs, causing his fatal fall. Daughter Janet (Carolyn Craig) believes it was deliberate murder. Arthur's will bequeathed everything to Marta, and Tracy Steele is hired to break it. Martha is also murdered. Sales manager Jim Hager (Herbert Rudley) intends to gain control of the company by marrying the widow Amelia. Lawyer John Kawasaki (Lloyd Kino) regrets preparing the will and commits suicide.
24	24	"Birthday Boy"	Mark Sandrich Jr.	Robert J. Shaw	March 16, 1960
McLaren Pineapple Company owner John McLaren (Wilton Graff) has legally designated his son Jim (Troy Donahue) as the sole heir to the business. Tom Lopaka is hired to make sure Jim comports himself as a responsible adult. Should Jim not be able to run the company, the inheritance defaults to John's brother Gordon McLaren (John Hubbard). John hires Tom Lopaka to watch over Jim. Gordon hires Honey Shaw (Fay Spain) to seduce Jim. When she succeeds in making him appear to be an irresponsible drunk, Tracy Steele goes incognito to derail Gordon's plans.
25	25	"Second Fiddle"	Jesse Hibbs	Story by : Stanley Niss; Teleplay by : Ed Jurist	March 23, 1960
Musician Gregor Kandinsky (John van Dreelen) and his wife Della (Myrna Fahey) arrive in the islands, and hire the services of Hawaiian Eye to guard his violin. Delia's jilted boyfriend Brad Finley (Paul Burke) and Gregor's former wife Mildred (Linda Watkins) conspire to murder Gregor, framing Delia by making false statements to Hawaiian Eye. Knowing he's on heart medication, the duo provoke a heart attack and steal his medication. Cab driver Kim has observed suspicious behavior and events that prompt him to alert Hawaiian Eye.
26	26	"Kim Quixote"	Mark Sandrich Jr.	Story by : Gibson Fox; Teleplay by : William Leslie	March 30, 1960
Con man Cass Robbins (Michael Harris) dies inside Kim'scab on their way to Hawaiian Village, with Mickey Grill (Don Gordon) as a possible suspect. Honolulu police Sgt. Leo Ayoki (Dale Ishimoto) investigates. Not long afterwards, Betta Dudoit (Laya Raki) gets in Kim's cab to allegedly escape a molester. She and Kim begin dating, and Kim falls in love. In reality, she and Rabbit (Ezra Stone) are trying to keep Kim from identifying Rabbit as the assassin. Before they leave for the mainland, they have plans to kill Kim. Mala Powers appears as Essie Danforth.
27	27	"The Lady's Not for Traveling"	Jesse Hibbs	Sam Ross	April 6, 1960
After scientist Grace Stanley's (Peggy McCay) passport is lifted, an imposter posing as David Branch (Richard Shannon) asks Tracy to help cut through red tape for Stanley's travel to Hong Kong. Communist Chinese agent Mr. Kwong (Philip Ahn) plans to kidnap her to mainland China, and is aided by John Ryerson (Phillip Terry). Kim Quisano and Cricket Blake discover the lifeless body of the real David Branch on the beach. As it turns out, Tracy was working with the United States Department of State to capture the Communist agents.
28	28	"Murder, Anyone"	William J. Hole, Jr.	Story by : Jerry Davis & Jim Barnett; Teleplay by : Robert C. Dennis & W. Hermanos	April 13, 1960
Sara Crane (Julie Adams) is having an affair with tennis bum Barry Logan (Ray Danton). Her husband David Crane (Herbert Rudley) learns of the affair from his business partner Mike Cornell (Richard Garland). When David is murdered, Sara and Barry are suspects as Tom Lopaka joins with the police investigation. Even Barry believes he killed David in a fight over Sara. Cricket, however, holds steadfast that neither Barry nor Sara committed the crime. The real murderer reveals themself and takes Cricket hostage in an attempt to flee justice.
29	29	"Typhoon"	Mark Sandrich Jr.	Story by : Wm. T. Orr; Teleplay by : Ellis Kadison & W Hermanos	April 27, 1960
On a sightseeing trip, Cricket, Tracy and Tom take refuge from a typhoon in the home of a retired army Col. William Conway (Bill Quinn), a friend of Cricket's father. Susan Conway Hart (Mary Tyler Moore) is his daughter, and the widow of Army veteran Jerry Hart. After they pull off a bank robbery during which Johnny Kane (Robert Colbert) killed the bank guard, the gang sets out to sea. Fish (John Cliff) disables the boat's radio, and they seek shelter during the storm at Col. Conway's home. Not knowing they are robbers, Susan Conway Hart offers her room to Edward Demming (Fredd Wayne), and his wife, Cora (Jean Allison). The thieves argue amongst themselves, resulting in Johnny killing Edward Demming, and Cora Demming killing Johnny.
30	30	"Shadow of the Blade"	Alvin Ganzer	Story by : Howard Browne; Teleplay by : W. Hermanos & Howard Browne	May 4, 1960
While waiting for his execution date on a French island near Tahiti, Bill Corbett (Fred Beir) escapes and uses his wife Helene Corbett (Joan Vohs) to communicate with Tracy, who travels to the island and begins investigating. Helene tells Tracy that her husband and the deceased were fighting over Lili Quan (Lisa Lu), who believes Corbett is innocent, and tries to help him to escape Police commissioner Jean Martin (Jean Martin). The prison administrator (Abraham Sofaer) gives Tracy three days to seek the truth. Tracy sets a trap.
31	31	"Dead Ringer"	Mark Sandrich Jr.	Story by : Roy Huggins; Teleplay by : W. Hermanos	May 11, 1960
Lola Richmond (Dianne Foster) murders her husband Michael, telling Tom Lopaka his whereabouts are unknown. She wants Tom to take his place and help her smuggle an ordinary statue of the Chinese goddess Guanyin into Macao, China. She insists Tom not tell anyone about their plans, but he leaves information for Tracy with Hawaiian Eye security guard Teo (Ralph Hanalei). Her co-conspirator Harry Sanford (Warren Stevens) knocks out Teo and steals the information. Once their plan plays out, the duo plan to kill Tom. Tracy learns from cab driver Kim's friend Skeeter (Tiki Santos) that Tom boarded a ship with Lola. A hidden nook in the back of the statue, prompts Tom to contact Tracey in Honolulu. Tracey tells Tom it's urgent that he return right away.
32	32	"Little Blalah (little brother)"	Charles F. Haas	Story by : Stanley Niss; Teleplay by : W.Hermanos	May 18, 1960
John Kramer (Paul Birch) has a business partnership with Sam Perkins (Wendell Holmes). Tracy is hired to protect Kramer's playboy son Bobby (Robert Ivers), whose older sister is engaged to marry Gavin MacLeod (Mike Road). Bobby's massive gambling debts are paid off by Tony Miller (Paul Dubov). Following a company burglary and murder, Tracy focuses on Sam, who uses Bobby's sister Sally (Andra Martin) as a shield in an attempted escape. Hawaiian Eye security guard Moke (Douglas Mossman) comes to the rescue.
33	33	"Assignment: Manila"	Alvin Ganzer	Story by : Douglas Heyes; Teleplay by : W. Hermanos	May 25, 1960
Tom Lopaka goes to Manila posing as deceased Wally Martin's brother Hank, in order to break up a gang smuggling US currency into China. Head waiter Pedro Vallejo (Leon Lontoc) is Tom Lopaka's inside contact. Believing Tom is Hank's brother, Saluda Razon (Lisa Gaye) takes a protective interest in him. American traitor Millie Doyle (Janet Lake) is an operative of smuggling racket head Ling Po (Robert Kino), and assigned to recruit Tom for Communist China. Saluda warns Tom he'll be killed like Wally if he does business with Ling Po. As a test, Ling Po orders Tracy to murder Pedro Vallejo. Saluda makes an important phone call that turns the tables on Ling Po.

=== Season 2 (1960–61) ===
No. overall	No. in season	Title	Directed by	Written by	Original release date
34	1	"I Wed Three Wives"	Alvin Ganzer	Hugo Walters	September 14, 1960
Hawaiian Eye has put Tracy in charge of protecting vacationing actor Mark Hamilton (Ray Danton) from former wives Mavis (Kasey Rogers), Sharon (Lenore Roberts) and Nora (Jeanne Baird) to whom he owes back alimony and child support. Tracy withdraws the protection when he learns the Internal Revenue Service is pursuing Hamilton for back taxes. His former wives kidnap Hamilton, but Nora slips him the car keys. He escapes and murders his manager Henry Bunker (Barney Phillips) during a disagreement over the IRS problem.
35	2	"Princess from Manhattan"	Alvin Ganzer	Stanley Niss	September 21, 1960
Tom's former girlfriend Irene (Janet Lake) is now married to Arab Prince Abdur Rahman (John van Dreelen) of Alizar and living in the United States. When the death of Prince Rahma's father necessitates his return to his Alizar homeland, Irene asks Tom's help for her to remain in the United States.
36	3	"With This Ring"	Alvin Ganzer	Hugo Walters	September 28, 1960
Childhood friends Patty Seldon (Terry Burnham) and Stevie Hughes (Roger Mobley) pledge to marry when they reach adulthood. To seal the deal, he gives her a ring he found stashed in a drawer in the home of his temporary guardians Aunt Stella (Ruta Lee) and Uncle Peter (Paul Richards). The ring connects Peter and Stella to robbery and murder. Patty shows the ring to Tracy Steele, who recognizes it as stolen. Stevie is put on their boat at the Ala Wai Harbor for their get away, not realizing Patty stowed away in the backseat of their car. She finds Stevie and tells him everything she knows, and he disables the boat's distributor so they can't leave. Patty and Stevie find distress signal flags and hang them out the window, where both Tracy and cab driver Kim notice them and come to the rescue.
37	4	"Sea Fire"	Mark Sandrich Jr	Ralph Madiera; Von Stuart	October 5, 1960
Tom tracks a narcotics smuggling operation. On a tip from cab driver Kim, he drives to Punchbowl Crater to meet with a source, only to discover that the informer has been murdered. Tom goes to the Kona District, Hawaii, following a lead that the drugs come ashore there. Smuggler Lou Carideo (John Marley) hires Alex Nelson (Fred Beir) and his boat for the illegal venture. Tom questions Angie Nelson who is gunned down, but survives. Tom receives information that Lou's brother Mike (Anthony Caruso) is behind the murders.
38	5	"Jade Song"	Edward Dein	Oliver Gard	October 12, 1960
A Tibetan lama posing as musician Yen Fu (George Takei) has fled communist-controlled China. Along with Lin Ming (Lisa Lu) and Wang Hai (James Hong), they arrive in Hawaii under the guise of being cab driver Kim Quisado's cousins. Wang Hai and Lin Ming perform in the hotel, where Tracy Steele has been hired to guard the group. Willard Young (Berry Kroeger) and John Lorkman (John Kellogg) are part of a plot to capture and murder Yen Fu. When the lama is captured and kept prisoner in a basement, it's Kim's love of music that eventually leads Tracy to find Yen Fu.
39	6	"The Blue Goddess"	Edward Dein	Robert J. Shaw	October 19, 1960
Harmon Kane (Burt Douglas) believes his new girlfriend Sharon (Suzanne Lloyd) is from a wealthy family headed by Martin Dunlap (Karl Swenson). After receiving a threat to anyone who comes near Sharon, Harmon's grandmother Mona (Anne Seymour) engages the services of Hawaiian Eye. In reality, Martin is a violent con artist who picked up Sharon in a bar. They plan to steal the Blue Goddess necklace from jeweler Mr. Sun (Philip Ahn) with a $275,000 fraudulent check outside of banking hours. Mr. Sun requests that Tom Lopaka find a way to verify the check, but Martin and Sharon try to escape on an outgoing ship.
40	7	"White Pigeon Ticket"	Mark Sandrich Jr.	John W. Jans	October 26, 1960
Rick Mason (Harry Jackson) is accursed by cannery boss Ed Leggett (Warren Stevens) of a warehouse robbery. Tom Lopaka asks Rick to talk to the police, but he panics and flees. His wife Edith (Joan Marshall) claims not to know where he is. Joyce Gilbert (Gale Garnett) once stole the cannery Christmas fund money to pay medical bills. The theft was blamed on Rick, who bailed out Joyce by replacing the fund with his money. Upon hearing that Joyce and Rick plan to relocate to the mainland United States, Edith plots revenge.
41	8	"Vanessa Vanishes"	Edward Dein	Robert C Dennis; Charles Hoffman	November 2, 1960
Heiress Vanessa Kinard (Mary Tyler Moore) is engaged to artist Pete Staley (Robert Colbert). Her father Ray (Phillip Terry) is estranged from her mother Vivienne (Linda Watkins) who is in a relationship with Cy Hanaford (Robert Lowery). Vanessa and Pete secretly elope and are honeymooning in private. Tracy Steele is brought in when Vivienne receives phony ransom demands from an alleged kidnapper. Both Ray and Tracy believe it is too soon to take the ransom notes seriously, but Cy pressures Vivienne to pay it. At the ransom drop-off site, HPD Lt. Danny Quon (Mel Prestidge) witnesses Cy Hanaford collecting the ransom money.
42	9	"The Kahuna Curtain"	Mark Sandrich Jr.	Robert J. Shaw	November 9, 1960
Jennifer Morgan (Shirley Knight) is an heiress under the protection of Tom Lopaka at Hawaiian Eye as she recovers from her father's death. Mark Wallace (Chad Everett) and his uncle George Wallace (Lyle Talbot) set up a seance scam to steal her inheritance. In spite of Tom's warnings, she becomes convinced her father wants her to turn over her entire fortune to them. The plan hits a snag when Mark realizes he's in love with his victim. Tom arrives at the seance location as George and Mark are in a bitter fight over Jennifer's money.
43	10	"Girl on a String"	Alvin Ganzer	Anthony Eisley	November 16, 1960
Puppeteer Michel Dalli (John Alderman) discharges assistant Sandra (Joan Staley) without pay. Her lookalike puppet is destroyed, and Sandra is soon killed in a hit and run incident. When Sandra's replacement Mona Lynn (Linda Lawson) finds her lookalike puppet strangled and later beheaded, she hires Tracy Steele to investigate. He suspects Mona and other women might be financially supporting Michel, who is living in a Hawaiian Village suite that seems beyond his financial means. Meanwhile, Michel's wife Tina is living at the more affordable Waikiki Vista hotel. Mona disappears, and Tracey suspects foul play, asking HPD Lt. Danny Quon to investigate. Tracey ponders Michel's father Louis Dalli (Edgar Stehli) as one of the main suspects.
44	11	"Kakua Woman"	Robert B. Sinclair	Robert J. Shaw	November 23, 1960
The title is a mis-spelling of the Hawaiian word "kokua' which means "help". Tom Lopaka explains that a "kakua woman" was any wife who cared for her husband at the Kalaupapa lepar colony. In the present, Ed Grimes (Mike Road) murdered a police officer and escaped to Hilo, where he is being cared for and hidden by his kakua wife Dora (Anita Loo) who turned over her life's savings to hìm. HPD Lt. Danny Quon sends Lopaka to bring Ed back to justice. In spite of Tom telling her Ed is planning to flee to Tahiti with his girlfriend Carol Judd (Stella Stevens), Dora gave Ed her life savings. Ed is eventually apprehended and locked in jail, where Dora visits him in jail everyday.
45	12	"The Contenders"	Edward Dein	Sam Ross	November 30, 1960
While dating Laura Steck (Myrna Fahey), Tom Lopaka discovers a scheme to fix the upcoming boxing march between her brother Joey (Jimmy Murphy) and cab driver Kim's cousin Duke Gallipo (Keone). Duke had been hoping a long time for this chance, and refuses to take a dive. Nevertheless, Joey's manage Pete Dailey (Frank de Kova) bribes Duke's manager George Moon (Weaver Levy). George lies to Duke and says he didn't take bribe money. Kim overhears the plan and believes Duke will never go along with it. Realizing Kim overheard them, George orders Kim kidnapped and beaten up by thugs. Even that won't stop Kim from trying to stop a fixed fight.
46	13	"Swan Song for a Hero"	Leslie H. Martinson	William Bruckner	December 7, 1960
Abner Dexter (Robert Lowery) of the Pacific Foundation awards Otto Von Helgren (John van Dreelen) a financial grant for a rafting experiment. Von Helgren refuses to be photographed, and smashes Cricket's camera. She is attacked in her own the dark room. Philip Houser (Paul Dubov) is suspicious and fatally shot while consulting Tracy. Los Angeles private detective Rex Randolph (Richard Long) helps Tracy tie Von Helgren to Mary Potts (Jean Allison) of Bakersfield, California, who has boarded a flight to Honolulu. Mary reveals that Von Helgren is her husband Henry Potts, a Bakersfield accountant. He has a long history of fake identities used to swindle money from people.
47	14	"The Money Blossom"	Edward Dein	Sam Ross	December 14, 1960
The valuable Cavier Islandia orchid is stolen, and its grower Eric McKay (Bill Quinn) is murdered. His daughter, Nina McKay (Olive Sturgess), discovers his corpse in the orchid house, and notices the orchid is missing. During commission of the crime, security guard Teo (Ralph Hanalei) is knocked unconscious. The theft was carried out by McKay's partner Alan Terry (John Baer), on the promise that Eric's wife Olivia McKay (Jean Willes) would run away with him. Martin Haney (Gerald Mohr) calls Alan "the perfect patsy", as Haney and Olivia are already having an affair with each other.
48	15	"Services Rendered"	Robert B Sinclair	Stanley Niss	December 21, 1960
Grant Williams joins the cast as San Francisco investigator Greg McKenzie. Businessman Ellis P. Adams (Bartlett Robinson) is duped by blackmailer Joe Gordon (Michael Pate) into believing that he killed a woman named Marcella (Leslie Parrish). Gordon fights with Adams, and tosses him onto a rocky cliff to look like a suicide. Adams survives and is rescued by Lopaka. McKenzie goes undercover as a wealthy tourist in a men's steam room, where he meets Gordon. The allegedly deceased Marcella later joins Adams and Lopaka in a bar.
49	16	"Baker's Half Dozen"	Edward Dein	Robert J. Shaw	December 28, 1960
Tom Lopaka is hired by six sailors who are victims of a confidence game run by Lou Norris (Peter Breck) and Dody Baker (Kaye Elhardt), wherein Baker "marries" multiple sailors, in various ports of call, in order to fleece them of their money. Norris's own wife Jean (Asa Maynor) shows up, recently released from prison after doing time for the same crime. After falling in love with sailor Johnny Randolph (Lee Kinsolving), Baker wants out of the scam, but Norris threatens to tell the police she acted alone in the scams. Randolph and Lopaka set up a plan to trap Norris.
50	17	"Made in Japan"	Frank Baur	Ed Jurist	January 4, 1961
A wave of counterfeit $20 bills circulates in Hawaii. Former World War II counterfeiter Capt. Joe Taggart (Frank Ferguson) is kidnapped by the counterfeiters who want him to make fake $50 bills for them. His grand daughter Jennie Taggart (Anne Whitfield) is also kidnapped after she solicits the assistance of Hawaiian Eye detective Greg McKenzie to clear him.
51	18	"A Touch of Velvet"	Edward Dein	Erna Lazarus	January 11, 1961
Artist Gordon Montagne (Clarke Gordon) knows an art gallery paid $1,500 for one of his paintings, but is being cheated out of the money by Raymond Brewster (Robert Hutton) who only gives him $50. With blind model Ellie Collins (Sharon Hugueny) still in the studio, a struggle ensues over the money, and Montagne is killed. Stripper Peaches Melba (Laurie Mitchell) is hiding Mickey Marden (Dick Davalos) who believes the police see him as a suspect. Ellie knows she can identify the killer, and keeps police officer Moke (Douglas Mossman) listening on the telephone as she lures Brewster into a trap.
52	19	"Talk and You're Dead"	Robert Sparr	Lester Fuller	January 18, 1961
Shipping dock worker Kilgore (Walter Burke) introduces Tom Lopaka to loan shark Haalee (Paul Mantee), who is arrested for murder. Haalee's fiancee Lala Wang (Lisa Gaye) offers Lopaka $2,000 to prove Haalee's innocence, claiming they were out on a date at the time of the murder. Another woman named Milliama (Miki Kato) says she was at the beach with Haalee during the night in question. Lopaka's business partner Tracy Steele doesn't believe either woman, and Haalee himself confesses to the murder. Kilgore disappears when he is later suspected to be the murderer.
53	20	"Robinson Koyoto"	Frank Baur	Juarez Roberts & Charles Hoffman	January 25, 1961
Micho Koyoto (Yuki Shimoda) of the Imperial Marines has been hiding on the Solomon Islands since World War II. Journalist Gloria Matthews (Julie Adams) enlists the services of Tracy Steele to find Koyoto to tell him that he's heir to Japan's Koyoto Industries fortune. Other individuals who are following Steele and Matthews have a vested interest in making sure Koyoto never re-surfaces. Koyoto, who is fluent in the English language, hides in the bushes after reading what Matthews was typing, and listens to Steele and Matthews talk about why they want to find him.
54	21	"The Manabi Figurine"	John Ainsworth	Lee Loeb	February 1, 1961
Bill Sinclair (Ronald Long) intends to sell a Manabi Figurine he claims is over 2,000 years old. Sinclair was hired by Carl Chiari (Patrick Westwood) to create the figurine and perpetrate the fraud for the money it would bring. Everyone is convinced it's an authentic artifact. Greg McKenzie is hired to protect it. Abby Deering (Paula Raymond) is the expert hired to authenticate it, but it is stolen before that can happen.
55	22	"Caves of Pele"	Irving J. Moore	Sheldon Stark	February 8, 1961
Helen (Kathleen Case) is engaged to Harvey Cross (Robert Ivers) but still loves her old boyfriend Carl Wakila (Mark Damon). The jealous Cross convinces Tracy Steele of Hawaiian Eye that Carl is dangerous and wanted by mainland police. Greg Mckenzie investigates and finds Carl has a clean slat. Family friend Peleka (Ethel K. Reiman) encourages Wakila to resume his romance with Helen. Another murder occurs, and Carl is blamed. Tracy's pursuit of the truth leads to a confrontation in the precipitous Caves of Pele.
56	23	"Man in a Rage"	Leslie H. Martinson	Sam Ross	February 15, 1961
Mike Lazlos (Robert Colbert) is a violent man who blames everyone else for his faults. So far, he's escaped punishment for his behavior. He treats his wife Rosa (Susan Crane) poorly, and steals from his sister-in-law Ginny Whittier (Cloris Leachman). She hires Tracey Steele, whose initial reaction is to fire Mike from the family business. Mike vows revenge on both Ginny and Tracey. He sets a bomb to go off in Ginny's shop, but mistakenly leaves it at home.
57	24	"The Stanhope Brand"	Frank Baur	Lee Loeb	February 22, 1961
Mark Ellis (Robert Clarke), a journalist friend of Greg McKenzie's, visits a private island owned by Ben Stanhope (Arch Johnson). He never returns, so Greg sets out to find him. Stanhope's daughter Nancy (Nina Shipman) believes Ellis left the island alive. Everyone else is afraid to talk about Ellis. Following a series of clues set in motion by a little island girl, Greg uncovers decades of deception and murder. Frank Cady, Lee Van Cleef and Frank de Kova also appear in the episode.
58	25	"The Trouble with Murder"	Edward Dein	Lester Fuller	March 1, 1961
Harry Lytton (Arthur Franz) is in love with his mistress Kiana Soong (Gale Garnett), and hires hit man Ken Grimes (Corey Allen) to kill his wife Laura (Ruta Lee). When Laura also wants a divorce, Harry hires Hawaiian Eye to stop Grimes, whom Laura begins dating. Harry Lytton is found dead in his car, but Laura refuses to believe Grimes was hired to kill her.
59	26	"The Man from Manila"	Michael Joseph Kane	Leo Gordon & Paul Leslie Peil	March 8, 1961
Tom Lopaka returns from a covert job where he was tasked with bringing Roger Porter (John Marley) back from Manilla to testify before the Grand Jury, to nail a murder indictment on Adam Kendricks (Kent Taylor). Porter is stashed away at the home of Martin Fong (Robert Kino). Photographer Artie Jensen (Boyd Holister) makes a deal with Kendricks to bring Porter to him. Porter resists, and in the ensuing struggle is killed, after which Kendricks wants no association with him. Things go awry, and Jensen murders Kendricks.
60	27	"Her Father's House"	Robert Sparr	Robert Tallman & Silvia Richards	March 15, 1961
Lily Shung (Ellen Davalos) was born in Hong Kong and orphaned at an early age, having only known her Chinese mother's side of the family. As an adult she travels to Hawaii to learn about her American paternal heritage of the Vanalden family. Initially, matriarch Lillian Vanalden (Isobel Elsom) denies that she could have a mixed race granddaughter. Greg McKenzie at Hawaiian Eye takes on the case, while Lillian's acknowledged heirs Vera Ormsby (Rebecca Welles) and Neill Ormsby (Craig Hill) try to get rid of her - first with a bribe, and then a murder plot. Lillian is horrified when she hears about Vera's and Neil's behavior. She apologizes to Lily, and accepts her as her granddaughter.
61	28	"The Humukumunukunukuapuaa Kid"	Michael Kane	Richard H. Landau; Gibson Fox	March 22, 1961
Jenny Drake (Anne Helm) marries fortune hunter David Stone (Bert Convy). After her mother Julia Syms (Adrienne Marden) disinherits her, Jenny, hires Tracy Steele. David offers to have the marriage annulled in exchange for a cash settlement. Julia refuses and is murdered. David continues to try to extort money from Jenny, while dating bartender Pat (Nancy Valentine).
62	29	"Don't Kiss Me Goodbye"	Edward Dein	Lester Fuller	March 29, 1961
After being cleared for the murder of her husband Ernie, Kitty Todd (Merry Anders) hires Tom lopaka and Tracy Steele to protect her and her son. An angry mob of neighbbors express their disagreement with the court's ruling, convinced she got away with murder. Unknown to her, Ernie had not bothered to divorce his first wife Ellen Lee Bronson (Anita Loo), who also ends up being murdered. Multiple bank accounts are discovered, one of which contains over $100,000.
63	30	"Dragon Road"	Robert Sparr	William L. Stuart	April 5, 1961
Tracy flies to Hong Kong to find a missing girl, as well as a detective who mysteriously disappeared when sent to look for her. Guest stars: Victor Buono as Malegra, Alan Hale Jr. as Big Mac. James Hong as Hop Toy. Frances Fong as Poppy Shu
64	31	"It Ain't Cricket"	Edward Dein	Edward Chappel	April 12, 1961
Crickett is kidnapped when she's mistaken for an heiress. Guest stars: Peter Breck, Gigi Perreau
65	32	"The Comics"	Andrew McCullough	Sam Ross	April 19, 1961
Entertainer Bunny White (Joe Flynn) brings his show to Hawaii. Mary Tyler Moore appears as his wife, Joan. Old acquaintances Iris Landon (Marie Windsor) and Chris Lewis (William Kendis) blackmail White. Tracey Steele is hired to find out what's in White's background, and asks HPD Lt. Danny Quon (Mel Prestidge) to run a background check. Meanwhile, Iris turns up dead.
66	33	"Father, Dear Father"	Edward Dein	Robert Tallman & Silvia Richards & John Hanson	April 26, 1961
Beulah Mae Willey (Judy Bamber) presents herself as an independently wealthy woman. The reality is that she works in a department store, and is searching for her estranged father to get his signature on an oil lease. She informs Tom Lopaka of a fake who tried to convince her that he was her long-lost father. While Lopaka is arresting him, someone shoots the faker. He's transported to the hospital and kept under guard. Everything is not as it seems at the hospital.
67	34	"The Manchu Formula"	Michael O'Herlihy	Robert Tallman & Silvia Richards	May 3, 1961
A 26-year-old woman (Lisa Lu) is hired by a dishonest person to pass herself as her grandmother Tsu-Yin (Beulah Quo) as a publicity stunt to sell a phony youth beauty cream. Both she and her grandmother begin to feel uncomfortable with the scheme and want out. Larry Chang (George Takei) is smitten by the younger woman. Greg Mckenzie is hired to guard the valuable Manchurian Manabi Figurine, locking it up in the Hawaiian Eye office safe. Nevertheless, it's stolen. Honolulu police detective Lt. Danny Quon helps investigate the theft, which is followed by a murder.
68	35	"The Pretty People"	Robert Douglas	Gloria Elmore	May 10, 1961
Skip Shanley (Peter Leeds) hires Tom Lopaka to guard arrogant movie star Derek Demarest (John Gabriel). Demarest uses and abuses everyone who knows him, but Cricket Blake (Connie Stevens) falls for his lies and phony charm. In a drunk rambling, he reveals to Crickett that she meant nothing more than a publicity stunt to get his name in the paper. Kim Quisano (Poncie Ponce) witnesses an argument between the two. When Demarest is murdered, she becomes the main suspect.
69	36	"The Big Dealer"	Leslie H. Martinson	Philip Saltzman	May 17, 1961
Tracy Steele's former girlfriend Julie Brent (Dyan Cannon) is dating prolific womanizer Hilary Kane (John van Dreelen). Kim Quisano and his friend Mr. Song (Robert Kino) go undercover to investigate Kane. When Julie Brent is murdered, and her body dumped in Tracy's car, he becomes a prime suspect. Max Baer Jr. appears as Ali, Kane's hired thug.
70	37	"Maid in America"	Paul Landres	Story by : John Jerrold; Teleplay by : John Jerrold; Ed Jurist & Gibson Fox	May 24, 1961
Greg tries to help Lan-Chih (Anita Loo) who arrives in Hawaii, believing her marriage by proxy in Hong Kong was legal. The groom Sam Sheong (Aki Aleong) tells her it wasn't a real marriage, but merely a ruse to get a pair of valuable antique vases into Hawaii. A thief named Geiger (George Keymas) steals the vases the first night, but Sam is reluctant to report the theft to the police. When the thief tries to sell the vases to a dealer named Raymond (J. Pat O'Malley), he's told the vases are fakes with no value whatsoever. Geiger is later murdered. The question arises as to why someone is willing to commit murder for fake vases.
71	38	"A Taste for Money"	Richard Bartlett	Anthony Eisley	May 31, 1961
Tracy Steele investigates a hit-and-run accident, in which Kim Quisano (Poncie Ponce) was injured. Kim says a man was driving the car that hit him, but police find wealthy Claire Monfreedy (Ann Robinson) behind the wheel after her boyfriend Charles Quinford (Robert Colbert) pushes the car over a cliff. Vaughn Taylor appears as her husband Harvey Monfreedy, who was already preparing to divorce her. Tom Lopaka and Tracy start closing in on Quinford as the prime suspect, who in turn accuses Harvey Monfreedy of murdering Claire.

=== Season 3 (1961–62) ===
No. overall	No. in season	Title	Directed by	Written by	Original release date
72	1	"Satan City"	Paul Landres	Story by : Darryl Hickman & Gordon Hunt; Teleplay by : Ed Jurist & Gibson Fox and Darryl Hickman & Gordon Hunt	September 27, 1961
Author Hilda Barton (Virginia Gregg) claims her latest tell-all scandalous manuscript was stolen. Sgt. Alika (MaKee K. Blaisdell) of HPD gets her to confess she cooked up the theft for a publicity stunt. When the manuscript disappears for real, nobody will believe her. Greg McKenzie investigates. Barton suspects editor Paul Hoyt (Arthur Franz), but he has an alibi. Jonathan Flood (Robert Ellenstein) is hired by Hoyt to murder Barton. When he loses his nerve, Hoyt tries to get Barton's daughter Cathy (Anne Whitfield) to destroy the manuscript, but she hides it instead.
73	2	"The Kupua of Coconut Bay"	Sidney Salkow	Robert J. Shaw	October 4, 1961
Real estate developer Martin Kingsley (Arch Johnson) is eager to build a city on land that native Hawaiians believe is sacred ground. Kingsley is willing to do anything to get the land, but owner Mama Mahina (Anne Seymour) is reluctant. Kupua is the Hawaiian word for any number of supernatural entities, who can be either benevolent in nature, or vengeful.
74	3	"The Moon of Mindanao"	Charles R. Rondeau	Charles B. Smith & Ralph Rose	October 11, 1961
Arriving in Manila in the Philippines to purchase a valuable pearl known as the Moon of Mindanao, Tracy Steele finds the seller Mr. Chang has been murdered. Steele assists police Lt. Agaton (Aki Aleong) in the investigation, before boarding a ship back to Honolulu. Eye witnesses describe an assailant who looks like the ship's steward Carl Ritchie (Robert Brubaker), who is also murdered before he can reveal who has the pearl. Alicia Thompson (Diana Millay) who met Steele in Manila shortly before the theft, is also aboard the ship and follows him everywhere, constantly asking questions about the investigation.
75	4	"The Doctor's Lady"	Charles R. Rondeau	Muriel Roy Bolton	October 18, 1961
Barbara Ingalls (Dorothy Green) is the main suspect when the mistress of her husband Dr. Kirk Ingalls (Alan Baxter) is killed. Taxi driver Kim Quisano (Poncie Ponce) brings her to Greg McKenzie for help. When he investigates, his life is threatened. Laura Matthews (Lisa Gaye) is the sister of the murdered woman, and the receptionist in Dr. Ingalls' office. Her father (Hugh Sanders) insists she quit her job and move back home, but Laura balks at the idea. McKenzie interviews Lono Williams (Larry Chance), former boyfriend of the deceased, who is still hostile that she left him for the doctor. Greg receives a telephoned threat from a man who does not identify himself. Greg and Tracy Steele working together finally figure out "The Doctor's Lady" is symbolic and tied to a gambling syndicate. Frank Albertson as Wally Gibbs, Sandra Gould as Mrs. Gibbs, Hugh Sanders as Mr. Matthews, Larry Chance as Lono Williams
76	5	"Thomas Jefferson Chu"	Paul Landres	Story by : Sam Ross; Teleplay by : Mark Rodgers and Sam Ross	October 25, 1961
Tom Lopaka is hired to find missing defense equipment stolen from Taiwan. He goes undercover in Mainland China where me meets alleged Chinese Nationalist "spy" Thomas Jefferson Chu (George Takei) who might not be who he says he is. Guest stars: Frances Fong as Chu's sister Lisa, James Hong as Captain Chang, Weaver Levy as Master Ling, Dabbs Greer as Harry Wilson, Robert Foulk as Captain Walker, Bob Carson as Col. Hurley Evans
77	6	"Pill in the Box"	Charles R. Rondeau	DeVallon Scott	November 1, 1961
Ted Brown ( Charles Bateman) is foreman over a hung jury, and is shot as he leaves the courthouse. He lives and ends up in a coma in a hospital. Cricket had known Brown since her early school days, and asks Tracy Steele to find out if the shooting was related to the trial. The accused Joe Wheaton (Robert Clarke) drops out of sight, and not even his wife Maxine (Merry Anders) knows where he is. While Crickett is visiting Ted in the hospital, he mumbles "Eddie's tough" referring to Eddie Coyle (Richard Benedict) Guest stars: Lewis Charles as Gus. John Daheim as Barney.
78,	7	"Kill a Grey Fox"	Charles R. Rondeau	Philip Saltzman	November 8, 1961
Greg is hired by mainland attorney Avery Carlton (David White) to help defend Reed Olander Jr. (Robert Colbert) accused of murdering secretary Lily Palani (Tita Marsell). Lily's boyfriend Lee Jay Koni (Paul Mantee) also comes under suspicion. Prior to an attempted murder of Carlton, his wife Jill (Jo Morrow) tries to convince Greg to get off the case. Evidence leads Greg to believe Jill fired the shot, and uncovers that Reed and Jill knew each other when they both lived in Greenwich Village, New York, during which Reed rejected Jill's attempts to be his girlfriend.
79	8	"Point Zero"	Robert Douglas	Montgomery Pittman	November 15, 1961
Cricket is kidnapped. Her no-show for her regular Shell Bar performance, makes Tom Lopaka launch an investigation Guest stars: Egeloff (Victor Buono), Elsa (Alana Ladd), Carl (Richard Carlyle), Mrs. Royerton (Beatrice Kay), George McKay (Chad Everett)
80	9	"The Queen from Kern County"	Paul Landres	Robert J. Shaw	November 22, 1961
Kern County, California, beauty contestant Terry Crane (Karyn Kupcinet) arrives in Hawaii. Moke (Douglas Mossman) and Tom find out that her managers Agnes Rondell (June Vincent) and Martin Rondell (Ross Elliott) are skimming off one-third of her earnings as their cut. Moke contacts Stu Bailey at 77 Sunset Strip, and is told there is no record of a talent agent named Martin Rondell. Curtis Harrison (Walter Brooke) refuses to give his wife Miriam (Paula Raymond) a divorce, in spite of her affair with Tod Warfield (Robert Hogan). She murders her husband, frames it to look like Terry Crane committed the murder, and tells Tod they're free to be together. Tod, on the other hand, is horrified.
81	10	"The Final Score"	Charles R. Rondeau	Fred Eggers	November 29, 1961
Con man Artinius F. Breckenridge (Jerome Cowan) spreads a rumor of a pending volcano eruption about to blow the Hawaiian islands off the planet. He intends to make a real estate profit from the ensuing chaos. Marsha Metcalfe (Marie Windsor) wants in on the scam, and wants her friend Orville Granger (Jeff Cooper) to be part of it. Not everyone is convinced the eruption will happen. Dame Alfreda Whittelby (Gale Page) lays a trap for Breckenridge, and hires Tracy Steele to investigate. Tracy and Greg McKenzie are concerned about the public panic that such a rumor would trigger. Lt. Danny Quon (Mel Prestidge) is ticked off about the rumors and orders Tracey to squash the stories. A trap is laid in an attempt to kill Tracey by shoving him into the volcano.
82	11	"Two for the Money"	Robert Sparr	Story by : Ted Hartman & Earl Barret; Teleplay by : Sonya Roberts	December 6, 1961
After the death of his former wife, wealthy Lucien Hammond (Oliver McGowan) hires Greg to track down his daughter Margaret, whom he has not seen in years. Clipping service owner Tony Ward (Fredd Wayne) steers him to Margaret Regan (Patricia Michon) who is adamant that she is Hammond's daughter. Peggy Ryan (Mary Tyler Moore) also claims to be his daughter and is knocked unconscious by a stranger ringing her doorbell. Harriet Regan (Irene Hervey) insists Margaret is the real daughter.
83	12	"Tusitula"	Dick Benedict	Story by : Gibson Fox; Teleplay by : Philip Saltzman	December 13, 1961
A manuscript said to have been written by Robert Louis Stevenson, who had sojourned in the Hawaiian islands 1888-89, is stolen from a boat arriving in Honolulu. The title of the episode refers to the name bestowed upon Stevenson in Samoa. It literally translates as, "teller of tales". Justin Crane (Kent Taylor), Sherry Reynolds (Judy Carrol), Lita (Susan Silo), Pilgrim (Ronald Long), Brooks (Tom Cound), Ronald Windsor (Lawrence Dobkin)
84	13	"The Classic Cab"	Byron Kane	Sylvia Richards & Robert Tallman	December 20, 1961
When Julia Abbott (Kathleen Crowley) returns to the islands to liquidate her father's estate, she sells his decades-old limousine, equipped with bullet-proof glass, to Kim who uses it for his taxi service. Much to his surprise, gangsters are willing to do anything, including murdering him, to get their hands on the limo. Harry 'Stinger' Hurley (Max Baer Jr.), Dan Woodruff (Tris Coffin), Floyd Hollis (John Daheim), Leo Basilius (J. Edward McKinley), Jake (Benny Baker), Paul (Andre Philippe), Big Sugar Akiona (Fuji), Len (Tom Sweet)
85	14	"Concert in Hawaii"	Robert Sparr	Story by : Willkie Stevens; Teleplay by : Marie Baumer	December 27, 1961
16-year-old mainland pianist prodigy James Harrington (David Macklin) hires Hawaiian Eye, ostensibly to allow him to concentrate on his concert rehearsal. Greg MacKenzie believes there is more to the situation than just the need for privacy, and Cricket coaxes him away from his piano to spend time with her on the beach. James wants to get rid of his long-time piano teacher Rosa Martell (Faith Domergue), who is having an affair with his stepfather Maurice Clifford (Jack Cassidy). K. T. Stevens as mother Claire Harrington Clifford.
86	15	"The Missile Rogues"	Edward Dein	Story by : Gibson Fox; Teleplay by : Robert Tallman & Silvia Richards	January 3, 1962
Lopaka faces dangers as he discovers foreign agents stealing missile cones. Guest stars: Jesse White as Cedric, Vladimir Sokoloff as Dr. Anton Miklos, Warren Stevens as Dr. Terence Bilson, Terence De Marney as Archie, Charles Bateman as Lt. Robert Driscoll, Ray Montgomery as Dr. Grimwood, Rush Williams as Keppel, Joan Marshall as Pamela Myers
87	16	"Little Miss Rich Witch"	George Waggner	Story by : Ron Bishop; Teleplay by : Philip Saltzman and Ron Bishop	January 10, 1962
Tracy Steel is dating spoiled heiress Mimi Wells (Janet Lake), to keep her from causing havoc with the hotel. When Cricket tries making friends with her, Mimi tells her that she wants to amuse herself by trying to engineer a jewel heist with Silk Simon (Robert Colbert). Unknown to her, Simon was hired by her half-brother Crosby Page (Charles Lane). Cricket and Greg McKenzie try to warn Tracy that he's being used by her to pull off the heist, but he won't believe it. When the heist is prevented, Silk tells Mimi that her half-brother engineered everything in hopes she'd be shot and killed.
88	17	"Big Fever"	Irving J. Moore	Richard Landau	January 17, 1962
Joe Storey (Alan Baxter) is wanted by HPD Lt. Danny Quon for running gambling games in the islands. Gerald Meade (John Archer) brings mathematics professor Walter Allen (Tom Drake) to a crooked poker game, intending to con him out of his money. Allen told his wife Jean (Andrea King) that he was going to observe a gambling game, but did not return by the next morning. After winning $100,000, he becomes a target for murder. When Greg McKenzie comes looking for the professor, Storey refuses to tell him anything.
89	18	"Year of Grace"	George Waggner	Silvia Richards & Robert Tallman	January 24, 1962
With cooperation from her companion Zara Latif (Paula Raymond), Crown Princess Suvi (Lisa Gaye) deliberately disappears with her presumed boyfriend Victor Soriano (Nico Minardos) during a stopover at the Honolulu Airport. Niall McMurtie (Patric Knowles) hires Tom Lopaka to find her. Zara and her father Colonel Latif (Edgar Barrier) are part of a plot to overthrow Suvi's country, while Victor really falls in love with Suvi. Colonel Latif plans to murder both Princess Suvi and his daughter Zara if they get in his way. Guest stars: Arthur Kendall as Nessim, Ginger Drysdale as Ann Pendleton,
90	19	"My Love But Lightly"	Irving J. Moore	Gloria Elmore	January 31, 1962
Tracy's former Parisian girlfriend Daniele Manet (Ziva Rodann) arrives in Honolulu, triggering bitter memories. Unknown to him, she smuggled jewels into Hawaii. He refuses to protect her when Louis Bon (Jay Novello) tries to hire him. Tracy warns hotel guest Coco Stanford (Jeanne Cooper) that her friend Curt Viner (John van Dreelen) is a thief in league with Felix (Dan Seymour). Daniele is working a jewel scam with all of them, but tells Tracy she's left Viner, who is later discovered beaten to death.
91	20	"Cricket's Millionaire"	Dick Benedict	Robert Hamner	February 7, 1962
Cricket finds her life in danger when she exposes a publicity hoax. Allison Kendall (Anne Whitfield), Denny Burke / Arnold Gwynne Weston III (James Cresson), Eddie Felton (Peter Leeds), Amos Kendall (Robert Warwick), Elaine Harrison (Breena Howard)
92	21	"Four-Cornered Triangle"	Charles R. Rondeau	Philip Saltzman	February 14, 1962
Greg McKenzie is hired to investigate Larry Brand (Chad Everett ), who admits he married Julia Tyler (Peggy McCay) for her money. Kathy Marsh (Leslie Parrish) wants Larry for herself. Julia and Larry are invited by Victor Haswell (Berry Kroeger) to a dinner party screening process for condo residency, and are subsequently rejected. Victor is later murdered, and Greg is hired to help investigate his death. When Larry believes his marriage to Julia is a mistake and tires to leave her, she shoots him.
93	22	"Total Eclipse"	Robert Douglas	Charles B. Smith	February 21, 1962
Frank Rowley (Robert Lowery) committed bribery of the jury to get Jean Morgan (Kathryn Hays) acquitted for her husband's murder. The deceased man's son Tony Morgan (Jack Nicholson) hires Lopaka to prove she killed her husband. Boyfriend Jerry Dulaine (Sherwood Price) wants her to run away with him, but she rebuffs him. Steele believes she's incapable of murder, and accompanies her on an inter-island trip to film an eclipse of the sun. She wants to start the company anew with a different staff, and dismisses Dr. Joseph Loring (Whit Bissell) who becomes the lead suspect in the murder.
94	23	"Blackmail in Satin"	Paul Landres	Lester Fuller	February 28, 1962
Stu Bailey (Efrem Zimbalist Jr.) at 77 Sunset Strip in Los Angeles is investigating blackmailer Anthony Inge (Bernard Fein) for Greg MacKenzie, whose client Marsha Monroe (Susan Seaforth) has hired Hawaiian Eye for her mother Cora Monroe (Linda Watkins). Harvey Hawley (John Holland) is very protective of the family. Greg goes undercover as a journalist, to track down the source of the Monroe fortune. After Inge is electrocuted in the swimming pool, Greg investigates.
95	24	"A Scent of Whales"	Charles R. Rondeau	Story by : Sid Saltzman; Teleplay by : Charles B. Smith and William Bruckner	March 7, 1962
Tom Lopaka is endangered after he rescues model Joan Carmichael (Sherry Jackson) from an attempted kidnapping by Steve Yordan (Dennis Patrick) and Marcia Vail (Grace Lee Whitney). Joan's uncle Ishmael Carmichael (John Dehner) allegedly stole highly valuable ambergris (a substance produced by whales and used in perfume) from Captain Dink Grogan (Emile Meyer), who offers $10,000 to anyone who captures Ishmael.
96	25	"A Likely Story"	Robert Sparr	Story by : Gibson Fox and Erna Lazarus; Teleplay by : Robert Hamner	March 14, 1962
Greg MacKenzie investigates a stalker who keeps sneaking around the home of divorcee Arnel Wade (Dorothy Provine). She is convinced it's her ex-husband Justin Wade (Fred Beir), who denies any part in it. Tracy intervenes when the previous home owner J. Wellington Owen (Robert Brubaker) breaks in and tries to knock out a wall. Owen had served a prison term for the murder of his wife, even though her body was never found. Greg uncovers a cash stash which Owen had hidden in the wall prior to his incarceration. Weaver Levy appears as household servant Kikane.
97	26	"The Meeting on Molokai"	Paul Landres	Gloria Elmore and Lewis Clay	March 21, 1962
A murder contract is out on the life of oil tycoon Jed Sutton (Neil Hamilton). An assassination is attempted when his flight lands in Hawaii, just as Cricket Blake (Connie Stevens) is taking photos at the airport. The assassin misses and eludes capture, but Cricket's photos identify Mike Armin (Richard Benedict). Jed's son Frank Sutton (John Cronin) hires Greg McKenzie of Hawaiian Eye to protect his father. Business rival Lucy McNeil (Dorothy Green), has agreed to a merger of their two companies.
98	27	"Payoff"	Charles R. Rondeau	Story by : Anthony Loeb & Hart Sprager; Teleplay by : Lee Loeb	March 28, 1962
Tom Lopaka investigates a bribery charge against assistant prosecutor Jim Kuno (Paul Mantee), brought on by local man Roy Briggs (Don "Red" Barry). Head prosecutor Ralston (Max Showalter) doesn't believe the accusations, but investigates to clear the record. Alleged victim Patricia Melford (Lillian Bronson) talks to Lopaka, who is convinced her story doesn't add up, and runs a trace on her background. After he leaves, she makes a telephone demand for more bribe money to keep up her story, and she is subsequently found unconscious with a skull fracture. Guest stars: Dora Light (Allyson Ames), Harry Fletcher (Michael Masters), Barbara Mason aka Mrs. Harry Fletcher (Fay Spain) Jim's wife Tia Kuno (BarBara Luna).
99	28	"An Echo of Honor"	Irving J. Moore	Gloria Elmore and R. Wright Campbell	April 4, 1962
After a theft of jewels belonging to Eleanor Temple (June Vincent), Sam Austin (Roy Roberts) reports his diamond stick pin as stolen. Madge Barlow (Renee Godfrey) reports a theft of her costume jewelry. Maj. John Kirby (Phillip Reed) rescues Carolyn Barnes (Dawn Wells) from Austin's unwanted flirtations, and she fantasizes Kirby as her boyfriend. She receives an anonymous gift of $500, and stolen jewelry is found in her hotel room. Temple's body is later discovered at the beach. Tracy Steele believes the thefts and murder are tied to a man named Comber (Paul Dubov), who in turn accuses John Kirby.
100	29	"Nightmare in Paradise"	Charles R. Rondeau	Richard Landau	April 11, 1962
Greg MacKenzie (Grant Williams) almost sideswipes another automobile being driven erratically. The driver of the other vehicle dies, with official cause of death being ruled a suicide. Honolullu Police Dept. Lt. Danny Quon (Mel Prestidge) knew the deceased well, doesn't believe the coroner's findings, and hires MacKenzie to investigate. Quon depicts the deceased as a drug king pin, and believes he was murdered by someone who wanted to take over his territory. Guest stars: Julie Gant (Abby Dalton), Dr. Hammer (Milton Frome), Jury foreman (Murray Alper), Nurse (Carolyn Lasater), Coroner (Robert Okazaki), Pilikika (Alicia Li), Anna (Eva Norde), Fletcher (Jock Gaynor)
101	30	"Aloha, Cricket"	Irving J. Moore	Story by : Charles B. Smith & Ralph Rose; Teleplay by : Charles B. Smith	April 18, 1962
Cricket Blake goes under cover in brownface, masquerading as a local island woman to ferret out a smuggling ring, after her friend Kina Nalu (Tita Marsell) is murdered. Guest stars:Mrs. Margate (Claire Carleton), Lowson (George O. Petrie), Ray Martins (Peter Breck ), Christopher (John Holland), Mr. Houston (Harry Lauter) of the United States Department of the Treasury, Dan Richards (Nelson Olmsted)
102	31	"The Last Samurai"	Richard C. Sarafian	Charles B. Smith	April 25, 1962
The non-Asian Lloyd family has embraced the Japanese culture, and decorates their home accordingly. Arlene Grant (Marianna Hill) is murdered while her roommate airline stewardess Peggy Donner (Nola Thorp) is at work. The murder victim had been a guest at a party in the Lloyd home the night of the murder. Seeing her picture in the paper, family patriarch Mitchell Lloyd (David White) is shocked and wonders if his son Charles Lloyd (Joseph Gallison) is involved. While Marjorie Lloyd (Irene Hervey) furnishes the Honolulu police department with the entire guest list of the party, Cricket Blake gets a tour of the Lloyd home. Charles Lloyd is incensed that his parents cooperated with the police. Hank Crowley (Eddie Fontaine) is the airline supervisor who assigned Peggy to the flight, and is later murdered by Charles.
103	32	"Rx Cricket"	Charles R. Rondeau	Story by : Herman Epstein; Teleplay by : Richard Landau and Herman Epstein	May 2, 1962
Cricket Blake and Kathie Nelson (Sharon Hugueny) are the only two heirs to a fortune. Kathie's boyfriend Alan March (Chad Everett) wants Kathie's sister Anne Hunter (Paula Raymond) out of the way. Cricket tells Tom Lopaka and Tracy Steele that Alan March is not to be trusted. In spite of that, when Kathie Nelson is poisoned, Lt. Danny Quon (Mel Prestidge) says Cricket appears to be the main suspect, since Anne had mentioned changing her will to make Kathie the sole heir. Lopaka believes the boyfriend set it all up, to get Cricket out of the way of getting his hands on the fortune. Tom, Cricket and Danny Quon set Alan up with a fake newspaper picture of Alan kissing Cricket's hand. Guest stars: Doctor Kellogg (Richard Benedict)
104	33	"Location Shooting"	Charles R. Rondeau	Philip Saltzman	May 9, 1962
A WWII movie is being shot in Hawaii. Lead actor Norman Ayres (Bill Williams) and actress Sue Alden (Joan Staley) are driven from the airport by Poncie Ponce. Greg MacKenzie is assigned to protect their privacy, having been told that Alden is the girlfriend of Ayres. Maggie McCabe (Marie Windsor) has also come along to Hawaii, willing to do anything to get Norman to love her. Sue's real life boyfriend Mark Hollis (Ed Nelson) lands a part in the movie, making her nervous. In the past, Ayres was blamed for running a car over his then-girlfriend Irene Harvey, claiming it was an accident. When Sue Alden is almost hit by a car driven by a disguised Maggie McCabe, Ayres is blamed. Greg starts to investigate and finds that Maggie bought live ammunition from a local gun shop. Maggie tells Mark Hollis to shoot someone so Norman will be blamed, and when he refuses, she murders him. Other cast members: Mort Schwann (Donald Woods) Ernst Bremen (Clinton Sundberg), Sidney Plunket (Sandy McPeak)
105	34	"Across the River Lethe"	Claude Binyon Jr.	Charles B. Smith	May 16, 1962
Keoki Fraser (Edward Colmans ) is visiting the island with his daughter Ema Fraser (Andrea Darvi). When he witnesses a murder, he abandons Ema and disappears. While Cricket's cousin Junebug Blake (Kathy Bennett), Tracy and Greg try to assist the police in finding Fraser, the killers are also trying to find him to pin the crime on him. Cricket (Connie Stevens) does not appear in this episode. Stevens, Robert Conrad and Troy Donahue were on location filming Palm Springs Weekend about this time period.
106	35	"Scene of the Crime"	Dick Benedict	Story by : Marie Baumer; Teleplay by : Leo Townsend	May 23, 1962
Renown author Jonathan West (Arch Johnson) invites a group to accompany him and his wife Karyn (Angela Greene) for a wild boar hunt on the island of Kauai. Tom Lopaka intends to join magazine reporter Gloria Matthews (Kaye Elhardt), but is mugged and hospitalized. Lopaka later makes it to Kauai before the hunt begins. Dirk Hansen (H. M. Wynant) is convinced Jonathan is not the author he claims to be. While everyone is asleep the night before the hunt, Hansen switches the bullets in Tom's gun with blanks. The day of the hunt, Dirk tries to kill Tom, as well as Jonathan's brother David West (Phillip Pine). He succeeds in fatally wounding both. Jonathan's death bed revelation is that his brother David was the ghostwriter for all the books that Jonathan published under his own name.
107	36	"Among the Living"	John Courtland	Richard Nelson	May 30, 1962
Inventor Shelly Prince's (Mike Road) latest aircraft invention catches fire. His former wife Sharon Prince (Grace Gaynor) suspects sabotage, as does Tracy Steele. Bishop (Robert Lowery) is unsuccessful in buying the patents. Bishop's girlfriend Annette Fallon (Roxanne Arlen) is likewise unsuccessful in seducing Shelly. Pilot Chuck Taylor (Edward Knight) was believed to have been in the cockpit when the plane bound for California exploded during a take-off. Annette had already had a fake will drawn up and witnessed by co-conspirator Gabe Jennings (Stephen Coit). A bogus funeral also takes place. Kookie (Edd Byrnes) at 77 Sunset Strip in Los Angeles investigates for Tracy and finds Chuck hiding at a motel in California. Guest stars:Honolulu police Sergeant Alika (MaKee K. Blaisdell)
108	37	"'V' for Victim"	Leslie Goodwins	Sonya Roberts	June 6, 1962
During a tropical storm, Greg and a group of tourists are stuck inside the mansion of Eunice Chalfrey (Isobel Elsom) and Felicia Fairweather (Hope Sansberry). A threatening note is found, and everyone speculates who wrote it, and who is it aimed at, until Clara Brill (Constance Davis) is the guest who is murdered. Unable to leave because of the storm, everyone gets on each other's nerves. More cryptic notes are found, hinting at other murders. Susan Woodruff (Antoinette Bower) is stabbed, but not fatally. Guest stars: Edie Barnes (Nancy Kulp), Alan Niles (John Lasell), George Brill (Phillip Terry), Angie Sloat (Sheila Bromley), Oliver the manservant (Leon Lontoc)
109	38	"Koko Kate"	Otto Lang	Robert J. Shaw	June 13, 1962
Business woman Koko Kate (Virginia Gregg) is looking forward to the homecoming of her son Chris Randall (Chad Everett). When he arrives, she gives him $200 as a welcoming gift. He pressures her for more money. She offers him work in her business, but he rudely refuses. Chris begins using the alias Stan Rogers. Several of Harry Sanderson (Don Harvey)'s ships have been hit by burglaries targeting women. The criminal masterminds Gloria Burns (Merry Anders) and her husband Danny Burns (Robert Knapp) coerce Chris into working for them. Guest stars: Agnes (Jacqueline deWit), Mabel (Vera Marshe)
110	39	"Lalama Lady"	Richard C. Sarafian	Robert J. Shaw	June 20, 1962
Arthur Dane (Whit Bissell) and beach bum Teo (Peter Brown) are working all the angles. Arthur has Teo steal the camera of his wife Linda Dane (Randy Stuart), presumably to hock it for money. Linda hires Tom Lopaka who recovers the stolen camera. When Lopaka learns that Linda is having a fling with Teo, he warns her that Teo is a beach bum who has a reputation for pursuing wealthy women. 'Tink' Tinkerton (Pamela Austin) is having affairs with both Teo and Arthur. In a violent struggle later, Linda shoves Teo off a cliff. Tom, Moke (Douglas Mossman) and Kazuo Kim find Teo's body. Tom and Lt. Danny Quon (Mel Prestidge ) believe Arthur Dane planned the entire thing months before. Note: Ulukau: The Hawaiian Electronic Library defines the word "Lalama" as "Daring, fearless, clever, as of a climber of precipices or trees."

=== Season 4 (1962–63) ===
No. overall	No. in season	Title	Directed by	Written by	Original release date
111	1	"Day in the Sun"	Robert Douglas	Robert J. Shaw	October 2, 1962
Troy Donahue joins the cast as hotel social director Philip Barton. Beachboy Johnny Olin (James Best) breaks into a business, shooting the owner Kiki (Marie Windsor) who survives but is hospitalized. Tina Billings (Elizabeth MacRae) hides Johnny. HPD Lt. Danny Quon (Mel Prestidge) enlists Philip in the investigation. Tom Lopaka questions Tina, who claims to know nothing. Phillip goes to the beach with her, believing her innocence. Lopaka tells Phillip to cut the date short. At her home, Johnny knocks Phillip unconscious. Lopaka and HPD arrive in time to save Phillip's life. In the end, Phillip offers Tina a job at the hotel.
112	2	"Somewhere There's Music"	Irving J. Moore	Ken Pettus	October 9, 1962
Teenagers Teo Nolan (Marc Romaunt), Earl (Armand Alzamora) and Chris (Gordon Wescourt) steal Kazuo Kim's cab. In the trunk, they find a Stradivarius violin belonging to Stafford Price (Wesley Addy), but are unaware of ownership or value. For Teo, It evokes fond memories of his deceased violinist father. He takes it home, where his sister Malia Nolan (Anna Navarro) says her father was more interested in violin playing than financially supporting the family. Teo takes the violin to his father's friend Nicolas Viotti (John Wengraf), asking for violin lessons. After Viotti notifies authorities of its whereabouts, he agrees to give Teo lessons.
113	3	"There'll Be Some Changes Made"	George Waggner	Jerry Davis	October 16, 1962
Cricket and Philip Barton try to help young widow Luana Mathes (Tita Marsell) hide her baby from the paternal grandfather Arnold Mathes Sr. (Harry Holcombe) whom she believes wants to take the child back to the mainland. The grandfather hires Tom Lopaka to help find his new grandchild. Through Luana's uncle Maru Amanu (Edward Colmans), he learns Luana is at the steamship office picking up tickets to take her new child to her native Tahiti. Once grandfather Mathes knows Luana and the baby are safe, he is happy to let them sail to Tahiti.
114	4	"The Broken Thread"	Charles R. Rondeau	Laszlo Gorog	October 23, 1962
Greg McKenzie's former girlfriend Evelyn Mason (Charlene Holt) is killed when the taxicab she was riding in was involved in an accident. Her possessively jealous husband Ralph Mason (Andrew Duggan) hires Greg to find out if she was with a lover when the accident occurred. Taxicab driver Kazuo "Kim" Quisado (Poncie Ponce) says Evelyn is his only passenger. Mason is obsessed with the suspicion that she was unfaithful to him. After opening her bank safe deposit vault, and finding that the only content was an old photo of her and Greg, Mason believes the other man was Greg. However, Greg proves his innocence with an airplane ticket placing him elsewhere when the accident happened.
115	5	"Lament for a Saturday Warrior"	Robert Totten	Story by : Robert Hamner & Robert Conrad; Teleplay by : Robert Hamner	October 30, 1962
Security guard Glen Thomson (Richard Davalos) is injured and hospitalized after trying to thwart a jewel robbery. Thieves Clay Barker (Steve Ihnat), Bane Craig (Bernard Fein) and Diamond Fence (Lloyd Kino) frame Thompson for the robbery. Lopaka has Adele Warren (Betty Brice) working undercover to expose the real culprits, only to find out that Thomson was in on the robbery all along.
116	6	"The After Hours Heart"	Irving J. Moore	Gloria Elmore	November 13, 1962
Phil's wealthy unmarried cousin Lucy McDowell (Peggy McCay) visits Hawaii. On a sightseeing ride in Kim's taxicab, she stops off for a cocktail, and meets author Victor Jason (Mark Miller) who lives on a boat at the wharf. He tries to discourage her, but she wants to marry him. Victor's former wife Liz Corday (Rebecca Sand) shows up and begins demanding money from him, otherwise, she will take away his boat.
117	7	"The Sign-Off"	Irving J. Moore	Gloria Elmore	November 20, 1962
Doreen Talbot (Elaine Devry) is unfaithful to her TV newscaster husband Steve (William Woodson). TV station secretary Sally Ford (Linda Hutchings) names her boss Van Baxter (George DeWitt) as one of Doreen's lovers. Doreen makes a play for delivery boy Ted Allen (Chris Robinson) giving him cuff links, which he immediately hocks. Ted is not interested in Doreen, as he is engaged to marry Lois Corey (Dawn Wells), who is also murdered. When Ted is arrested for murder, Phil Barton (Troy Donahue) and Greg MacKenzie (Grant Williams) investigate, in spite of Lt. Danny Quon (Mel Prestidge) being convinced of Ted's guilt. Neighbor Hildegarde (Cheerio Meredith) helps Phil regarding story gaps of the night of the murder. Vince Edwards has an unaccredited cameo as Dr. Sam Casey, as a side joke reference to his TV show Ben Casey,
118	8	"A Night with Nora Stewart"	Irving J. Moore	Philip Saltzman	November 27, 1962
Vocalist Nora Stewart (Dorothy Provine) announces her intent to resume live performing following a lengthy occupational burnout sabbatical. Greg McKenzie doesn't think she's yet emotionally strong enough to be in front of an audience. Her masseuse Vera (Connie Gilchrist) suggests she needs more time away from performing. Still married to estranged husband Les Frazer (Robert Clarke), her manager Martin Short (Jerry Paris) urges her to get a divorce so they can be wed. After a series of events that appear she's being stalked, Nora cancels her concert. Greg investigates and proves she engineered the situations to avoid performing.
119	9	"To See, Perchance to Dream"	Robert Totten	Richard Landau	December 4, 1962
After a race car crash at Le Mans, Philip Barton's friend Eddie Croft (Jack Hogan) recovers in Hawaii. While in the hospital waiting room in Honolulu, he encounters Aunt Lehela (Argentina Brunetti) and her niece Kini (Victoria Vetri). When he becomes aware that Kini is sight-impaired and seeing Dr. Albee (Wallace Rooney), he encourages her to have operations that will give her sight. Eddie and Kini develop a friendship. Guest stars: Ben Benson (John Carlyle) Art Catlin (James O'Hara), Audrey (Breena Howard)
120	10	"Pursuit of a Lady"	Irving J. Moore	Story by : Lee Loeb; Teleplay by : Lee Loeb and Gloria Elmore	December 11, 1962
Greg MacKenzie proposes marriage to tennis pro Liz Downing (Diane McBain) who stalls answering. After she is murdered, Tom Lopaka investigates, discovering that Greg was but one in a long line of men she used to advance her career, then tossed aside. Married tennis pro Joe Richards (Fred Beir) helped raise her up out of obscurity, only to be coldly discarded as she moved to the next man. Mona Orello (Donna Martell) tells Greg about Liz using her brother Peter Orello (Valentin de Vargas) and then tossing him aside. Other co-stars: Ray Hadley (Bob Carson), Miriam Kendall (Angela Greene), Lawrence Kendall (John Howard)
121	11	"Shannon Malloy"	Irving J. Moore	Story by : Philip Sanford; Teleplay by : Robert Hamner	December 18, 1962
Full time waitress Shannon Malloy (Susan Silo) is a struggling young artist who becomes the recipient of a fortune in pearls from a mysterious benefactor. Guest stars: Father Malloy (Thomas Jackson), Paula (Paula Hicks), Simon Devlin (Paul Genge), Janine Westerfield (Jolene Brand), Cozy Neal (H. M. Wynant), Mavis Sloan (Virginia Gregg)
122	12	"Go Steady with Danger"	Richard Benedict	Sonya Roberts	January 1, 1963
Gigolo Harry Larcombe (Michael Dante) dates and then blackmails married women. Mrs. Bower (Louise Arthur) kills herself in shame. He hits another snag when the never-married Edith Wilkes (Jeanette Nolan) pressures him to marry her. After murdering her, he looks for a quick exit from Hawaii. Teenager Mary Anne Sayer (Cheryl Holdridge) develops an unrequited crush on Tom Lopaka, and dates Harry to make Tom jealous. The investigation into the death of Edith Wilkes puts Tom hot on the trail of Harry, who uses Mary Anne as a human shield when he tries to flee the islands.
123	13	"Kupikio Kid"	Irving J. Moore	Story by : Robert J. Shaw; Teleplay by : Robert J. Shaw and Robert Hamner	January 8, 1963
Judson Kirk (Simon Scott) has received discouraging news from his doctor, and before he dies, wants to reconcile his relationship with his estranged son Peter (Joseph Gallison). The more he tries, the more Peter wants distance. Poppy (Anita Loo) convinces her friend Denny Hale (George O. Petrie) to hire Peter, which inspires Denny to hold Peter for ransom. Judson and his wife Mary Kirk (Irene Hervey) enlist the aid of Tom Lopaka to rescue their son. Connie Stevens only appeared in three episodes of the 4th and final season, replaced by Sunny Day (Tina Cole) as the local singer.
124	14	"Maybe Menehunes"	Robert Sparr	Lee Loeb	January 15, 1963
Norma (Dianne Foster) and Arnold Marriott (Andrew Duggan) plan to build a house on native Hawaiian sacred ground. She dismisses Hawaiian high priest Akao (Joe De Santis) as a "witch doctor". Norma becomes more determined as others try to reason with her. She is hospitalized after being hit on the head with a backhoe. Guest stars:Sunny Day (Tina Cole), Leola Kuno (Ellen Davalos) Kamaki (Don Ho), Honolulu Mayor Neal Blaisdell as himself. Gilbert Lani Kauhi who played Kono on Hawaii Five-O appears an unaccredited extra.
125	15	"Pretty Pigeon"	Irving J. Moore	Story by : Brevarde & Leonard Lee; Teleplay by : Gloria Elmore and Brevarde & Leonard Lee	January 22, 1963
Tom Lopaka, undercover as Surfer Sam, taxi driver Kazuo Kim, and mystery writer Charlene Boggs (Diane McBain) investigate a suicide at a Kauai resort hotel. Actor Steel Lawless (Bill Williams) strikes out in his many attempts to seduce Charlene. Mele (Caroline Kido) is fired from the resort. Olivia Goff (Linda Watkins) and her son Franklin Goff (Douglas Dick) are secretly photographing Charlene, and give her a drugged cocktail. After she passes out, they take blackmail pictures of her in Franklin's arms, making it look like they're embracing. Franklin hits her up for $60,000 in blackmail money. Guest star: Susan Hale (Mala Powers)
126	16	"Two Too Many"	Robert Totten	Lester Fuller	January 29, 1963
Building developer Jeff Richardson (William Leslie) is outed by Evelyn Hadley (Kathie Browne) as her lover. His wife Sue (Lisa Lu) believes Jeff's denials. Her father C.K. Yang (Richard Loo) denies involvement, but professes to believe Evelyn. In spite of her father's denials, Sue suspects he is behind everything. Evelyn produces her personal diary as proof, causing Jeff in a fit of anger wanting to strangle her. Evelyn calls the person who hired her, trying to back out of the deal. She ends up dead instead. Lt. Danny Quon (Mel Prestidge) investigates.
127	17	"Boar Hunt"	Robert Sparr	Robert Hamner	February 5, 1963
Phil Barton's uncle Miles Maitland (George Montgomery) is vacationing at the Kauai Surf Hotel. Miles and Mary Ann Abbott (Lisa Gaye) intend to marry, but she must first divorce her husband Duane (John Archer). When the two men embark on a wild boar hunt, Phil travels to Kauai accompanied by Continental Insurance investigator Van Stewart (Mark Dempsey). Miles is insured for $500,000, and offers Dana Englund (Joan Marshall) $100,000 to kill Duane. While they are camped overnight, Lono Lindsay (Sterling Mossman) sings "There's No Place Like Hawaii".
128	18	"Go for Baroque"	Irving J. Moore	Robert Hamner	February 12, 1963
Claiming to be a descendant of Hawaiian royalty, David Palani (Hans Wedemeyer) asserts that Hawaii was stolen from its rightful heirs. When a Polynesian navigation chart is stolen from the collection of the late Professor Coleman, Palani is the prime suspect. Linda Coleman (Jenny Maxwell) believes the thief is Warren Boyd (Russell Johnson) who has suddenly come into financial wealth. Janet Coleman (Joanna Moore) murders Boyd, blaming Linda for the crime. Tom Lopaka, however, arrests Janet.
129	19	"The Long Way Home"	Robert Totten	Story by : Joel Rogosin; Teleplay by : Laszlo Gorog and Joel Rogosin	February 19, 1963
After botching an armored car hold-up, two thugs kidnap Julie Keith (Susan Seaforth), the daughter of movie star Paula Keith (Jeanne Cooper). However, the relationship between the more volatile of the men and the embittered Julie becomes far more complicated and soon the two men fall out with deadly consequences. Guest stars: Floyd Dillon (Victor French), Linc Hanley (Richard Benedict), Spence Merrill (Richard Bakalyan)
130	20	"Two Million Too Much"	Robert Sparr	Robert Hamner	February 26, 1963
Don Munroe (Van Williams) and Grady Howells (Fred Holliday) kidnap Tom Lopaka, injecting him with sodium pentothal, or truth serum, in order to learn about the route of the armored car carrying two million dollars in cash: a route which only Tom, Greg MacKenzie, and Moke (Douglas Mossman) were supposed to know about. Don plans to use the money to help his ailing wife, Anne Munroe (Barbara Bain), who needs medical attention. After Moke and the other guards guarding the armored car are robbed, Tom, Greg, and Moke take a lie detector test to figure out who leaked the plans, but this only proves their innocence. Meanwhile, Don rushes home amid counting the money as Anne is feeling severely ill. She passes away shortly after, which devastates Don. Tom finds out he was injected with sodium pentothal, and subjects his girlfriend, model Karen Dale (Karen Sharpe), to the lie detector test, believing she was involved. Despite her refusal to answer questions, her results prove she was in cahoots with Grady. The police and the Hawaiian Eye private investigators track down Don and Grady at the airport, planning to flee with the money to the mainland. While Grady surrenders after their brief shoot-out with the police, Don is killed by Lt. Danny Quon (Mel Prestidge) when he tries to run, refusing to surrender. Guest star: Airport Inspector (Ray Montgomery)
131	21	"Blow Low, Blow Blue"	Dick Benedict	Lee Loeb	March 5, 1963
Music record shop owner Sam (Victor Sen Yung) helps Crickett arrange for her favorite jazz musician trumpeter Joey Vito (Biff Elliot) to perform at the Blue Grotto nightclub. Vito had served time in prison for killing a man in a fight, later being paroled when new evidence cleared him. The victim's mother Diane Calloway (Kathryn Givney) is seeking revenge, and vows to close down the Blue Grotto nightclub if Joey performs there. Joey's daughter Elena Vito (Joan Freeman) believes he should continue to perform. She produces a letter written by Diane's deceased son that puts the responsibility of his death on his own mother, causing her to drop her revenge plans.
132	22	"Gift of Love"	Robert Sparr	Story by : Leo Gordon & Amos Powell; Teleplay by : Philip Saltzman	March 19, 1963
Evangelist Brother Love (Kevin Hagen) is under investigation by Hawaiian Eye. Widow Helena Ogden (Peggy McCay), who can't walk, believes Love can heal her. He denies healing powers, and refuses her money. His handlers Linda (Catherine McLeod) and Mitchell (Oliver McGowan) Weir are eager to take money. Philip Barton and Cricket uncover a long line of scam investigations about the Weirs that Brother Love was not aware of, and is subsequently shot by Mitchell. Brother Love confronts the Mitchells, and Helena finally walks as she reaches for the telephone to call the police. The final episode with Connie Stevens, who only appeared in three 1963 episodes
133	23	"The Sisters"	Robert Sparr	Story by : John Falvo & Peter Mamakos; Teleplay by : John Falvo	March 26, 1963
Sisters Nora (Myrna Fahey) and Nancy Cobinder (Maggie Pierce) arrive in Hawaii following the murder of Nancy's ex-boyfriend Nick Jefers. Paul Marron (Russ Conway), Gorday (Harry Lauter) and Piper (Paul Dubov) want Nora out of the way, preferably dead, but Greg MacKenzie of Hawaiian Eye gives her a tour of Oahu. Nancy remains a recluse in the hotel room. Greg's mainland friend George Poole (Ronald Long) is being held as a suspect in the death of Nick Jefers. Nora later confesses to killing Nick Jefers after he tried to sexually molest her.
134	24	"Passport"	Robert Sparr	Story by : Lloyd Rosamond; Teleplay by : Don Tait	April 2, 1963
Greg MacKenzie follows a tour group to Tokyo in order to keep tabs on suspected embezzler Roger Alston (Gerald Mohr). Alston has returned to his wife Nan Alston (Randy Stuart) and daughter Trudi Alston (Beverly Washburn), surprising them with a tour of Asia. After Roger disappears in Asia, Greg finds out he's a foreign agent with a hit contract out on him. His daughter is held for ransom. Once Roger pays the ransom, his daughter is freed but he's murdered.
