= Paul Stewart (actor) =

American actor (1908–1986)

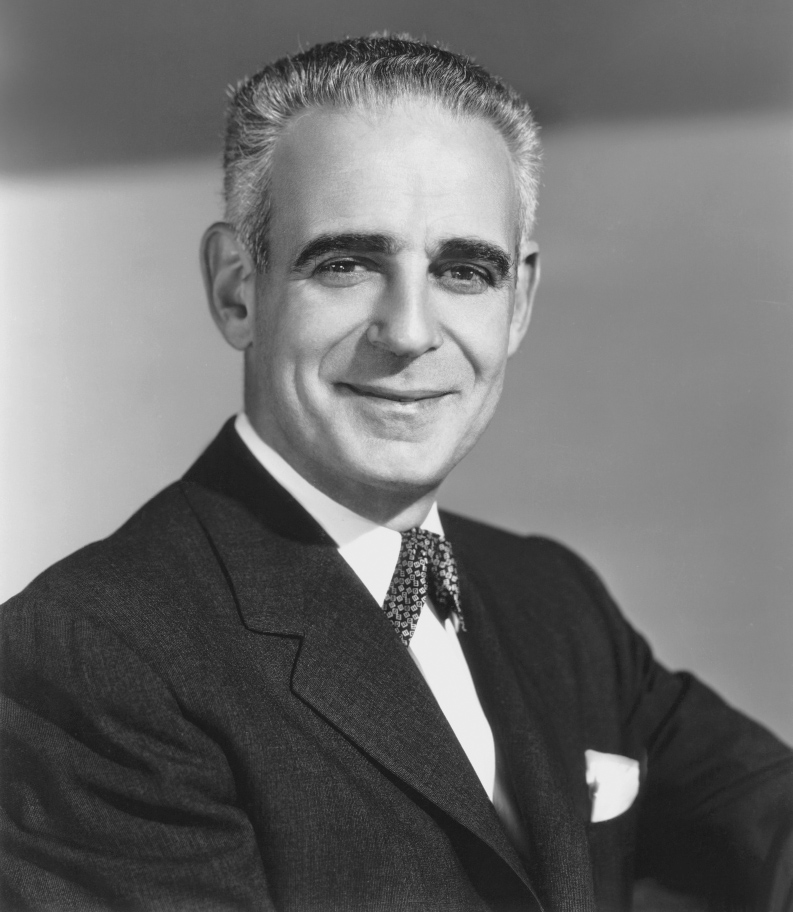
- Stewart in 1955
- Born: Paul Sternberg; March 13, 1908; Manhattan, New York, U.S.
- Died: February 17, 1986 (aged 77); Los Angeles, California, U.S.
- Education: Columbia University
- Occupations: Actor; director; producer
- Years active: 1930–1985
- Spouse: Peg LaCentra (m. 1939)

Paul Stewart (born Paul Sternberg; March 13, 1908 – February 17, 1986) was an American character actor, director and producer who worked in theatre, radio, films and television. He frequently portrayed cynical and sinister characters throughout his career.

A friend and associate of Orson Welles for many years, Stewart helped Welles get his first job in radio and was associate producer of the celebrated radio program "The War of the Worlds", in which he also performed. One of the Mercury Theatre players who made their film debut in Welles's landmark film Citizen Kane, Stewart portrayed Kane's butler and valet, Raymond. He appeared in 50 films, and performed in or directed some 5,000 radio and television shows.

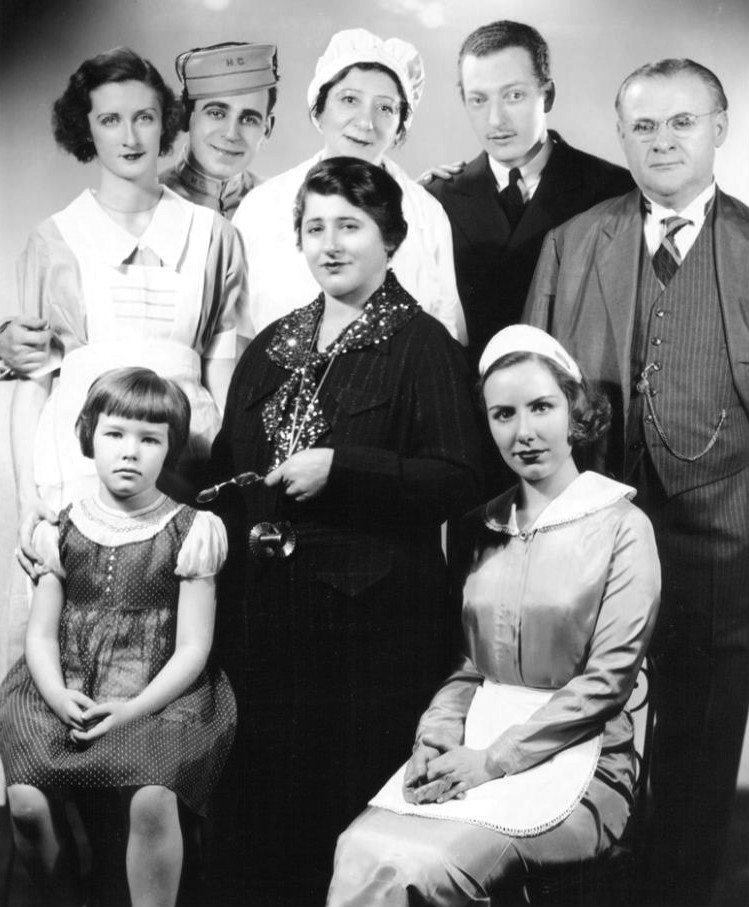
The cast of Gertrude Berg's House of Glass (1935)

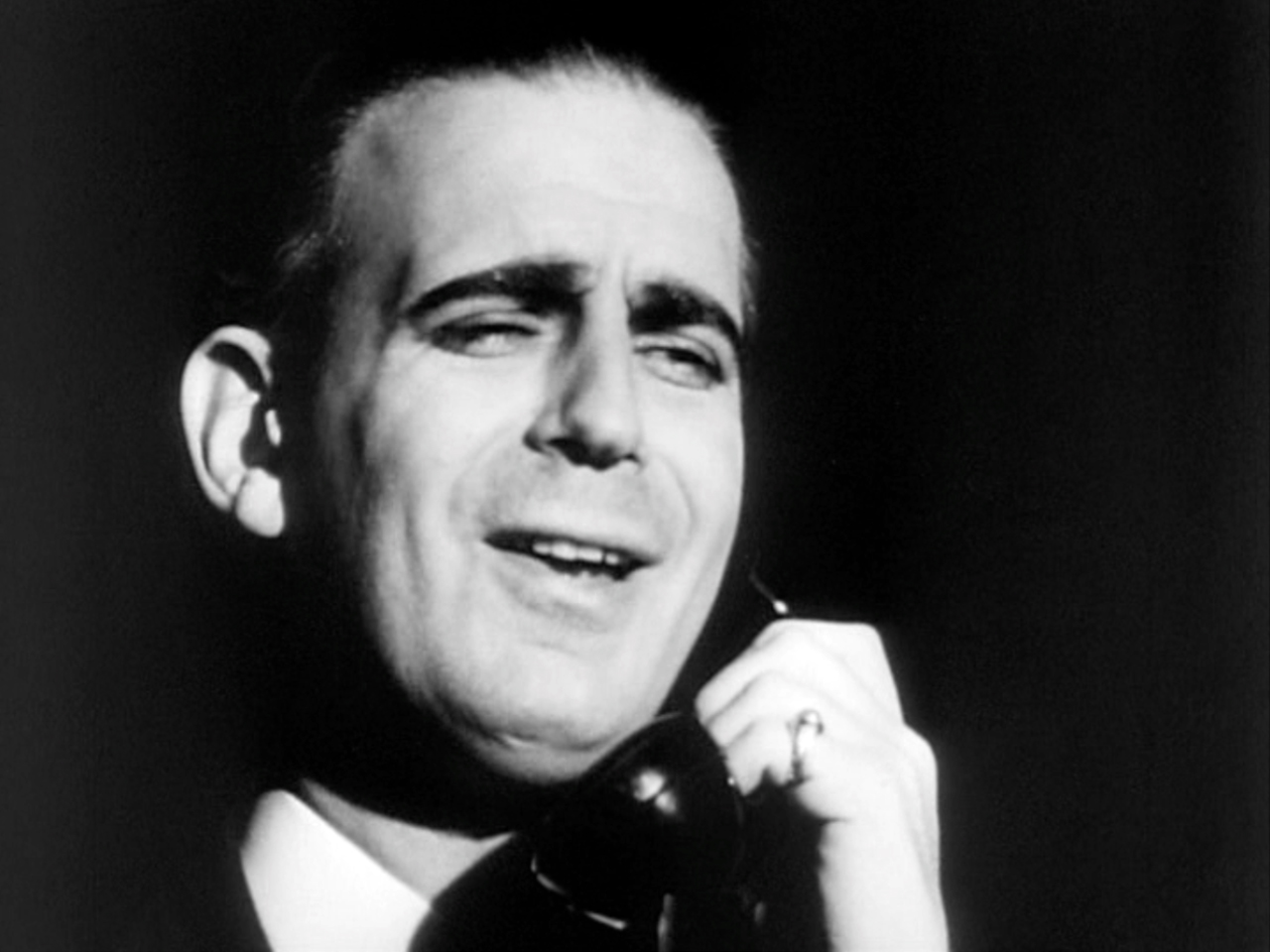
As Raymond in the trailer for Citizen Kane (1941)

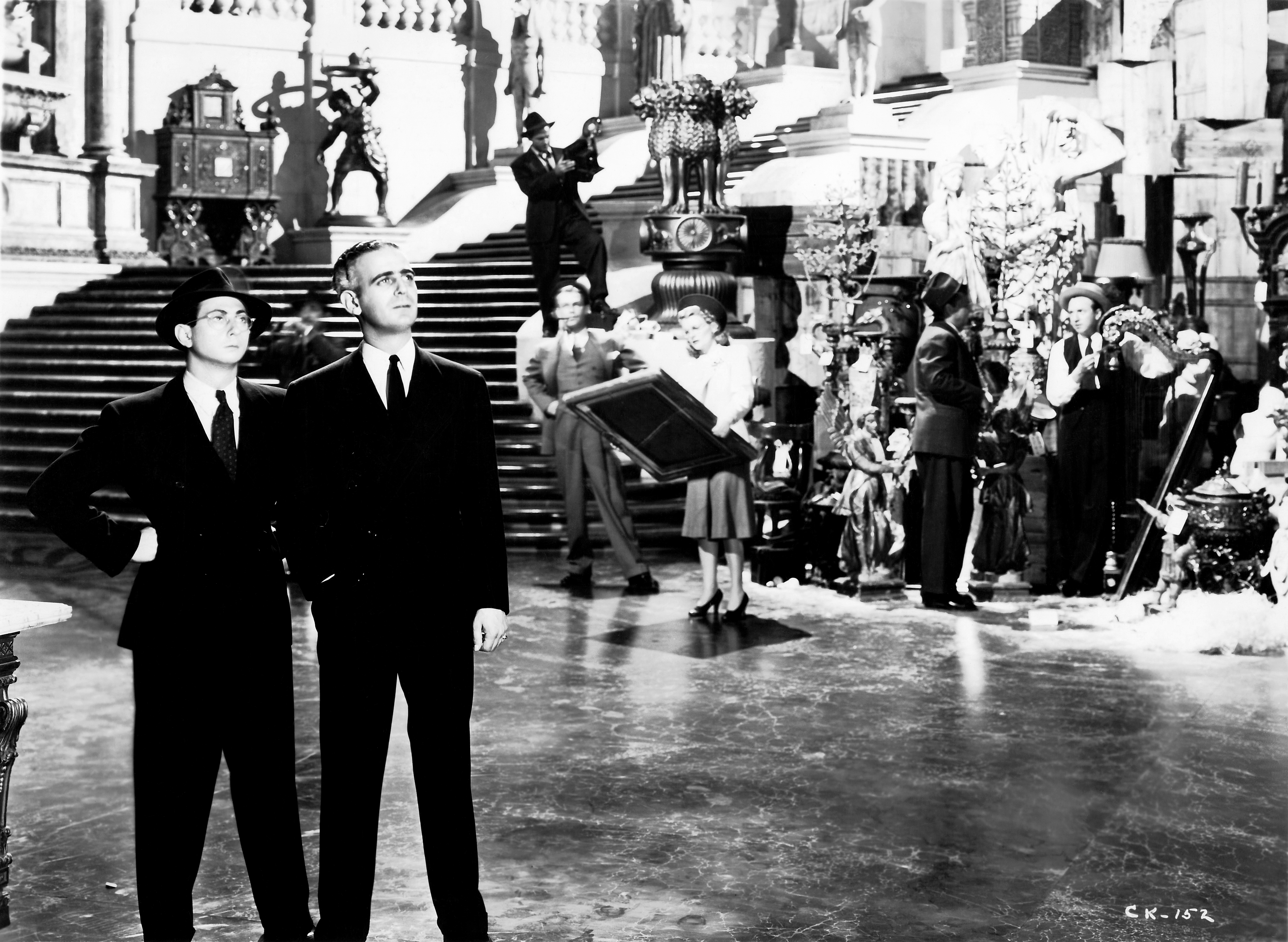
William Alland and Paul Stewart in Citizen Kane (1941)

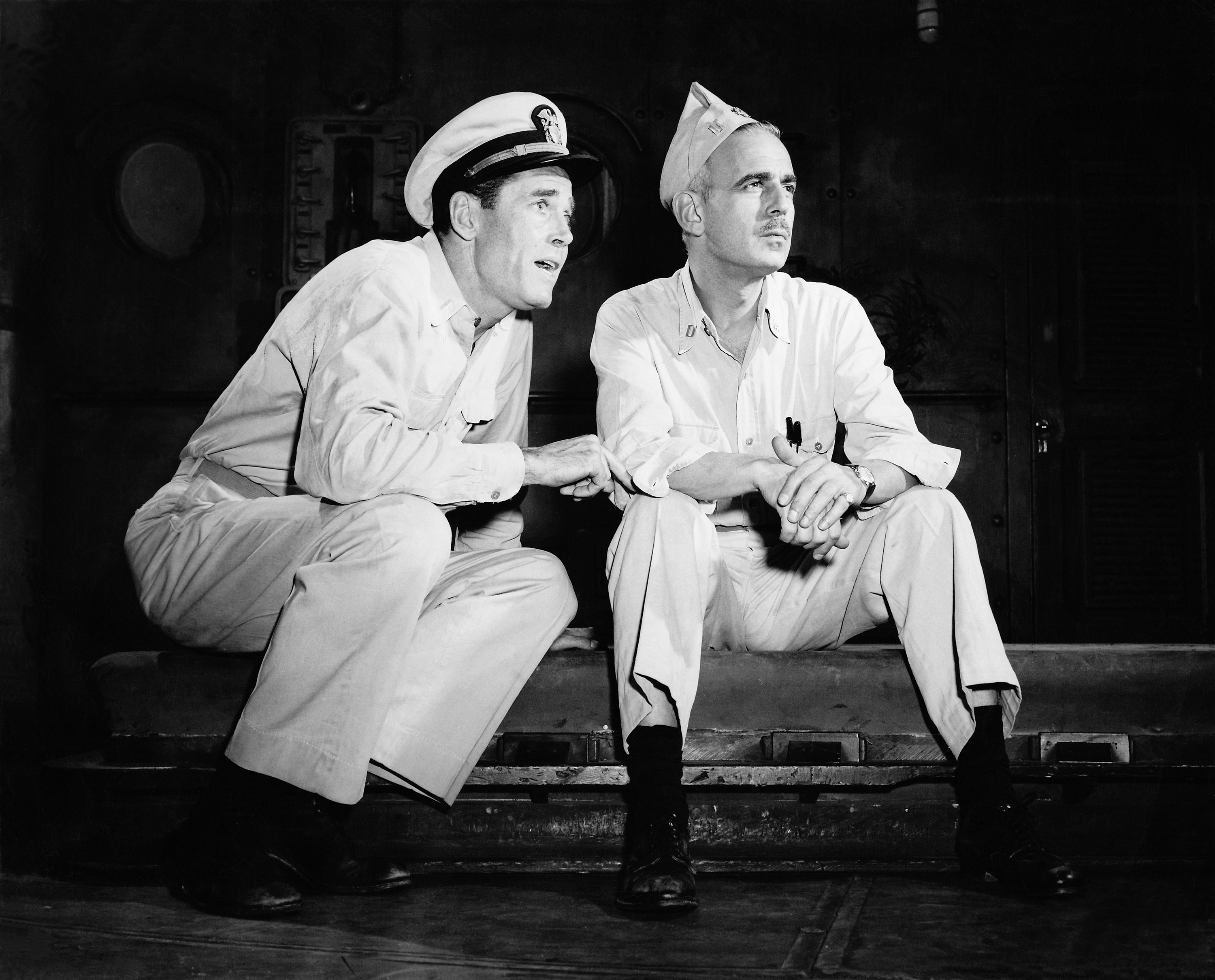
With Henry Fonda in the Broadway production of Mister Roberts (1950)

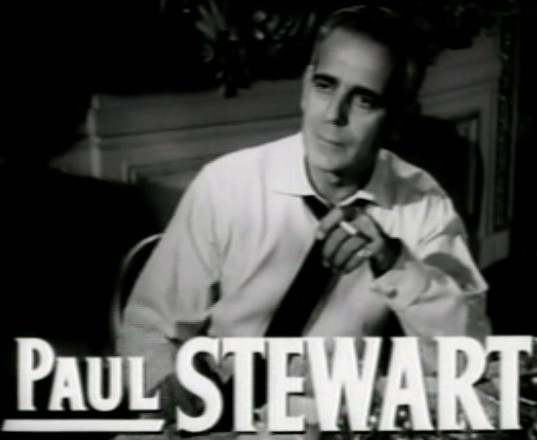
The Bad and the Beautiful (1952)

== Biography ==
Paul Stewart was born in Manhattan, New York, on March 13, 1908, as Paul Sternberg. His parents were Maurice D. Sternberg, a salesman and credit agent for a textile manufacturer, and Nathalie C. (née Nathanson) Sternberg; both were born in Minneapolis. Stewart attended public school and completed two years at Columbia University, studying law. He had received first place in the Belasco Theatre Tournament in 1925 and decided on an acting career.

Stewart began his stage career in New York as teenager. He made his Broadway debut in 1930, in Subway Express. He next appeared in the 1931 play, Two Seconds, adapted as a film the next year.

In 1932, after two additional Broadway credits, Stewart moved to Cincinnati and went to work at radio station WLW. There, in 1928, radio pioneer Fred Smith had created the program Newscasting, which in 1931 evolved into the popular national news series, The March of Time. For 13 months Stewart worked in all aspects of radio production at WLW – acting, announcing, directing, producing, writing and creating sound effects. When he returned to New York he was on The March of Time and a member of radio's elite corps of actors.

In 1934, Stewart introduced Orson Welles to director Knowles Entrikin, who gave Welles his first job on radio, on The American School of the Air. "I'd been turning up for auditions and never landing a job until I met Paul Stewart," Welles recalled. "He's a lovely man; for years he was one of the main pillars of our Mercury broadcasts. He can't be given too much credit."

In March 1935 Stewart saw Welles's stage performance in Archibald MacLeish's verse play Panic, and recommended him to director Homer Fickett. Welles was auditioned and hired to join the repertory company that presented The March of Time.

"It was like a stock company, whose members were the aristocrats of this relatively new profession of radio acting," wrote fellow actor Joseph Julian. At that time Julian had to content himself with being an indistinguishable voice in crowd scenes, envying this "hallowed circle" that included Stewart, Welles, Kenny Delmar, Arlene Francis, Gary Merrill, Agnes Moorehead, Jeanette Nolan, Everett Sloane, Richard Widmark, Art Carney, Ray Collins, Pedro de Cordoba, Ted de Corsia, Juano Hernandez, Nancy Kelly, John McIntire, Jack Smart and Dwight Weist. The March of Time was one of radio's most popular shows.

Stewart was a founder of the American Federation of Radio Artists in August 1937, and one of its inaugural officers. He carried card number 39 in the union and was a frequent delegate at the national convention. He was also a board member of the Screen Actors Guild, and a member of the Directors Guild of America and the Academy of Motion Picture Arts and Sciences.

Stewart played various roles throughout Welles's memorable tenure as Lamont Cranston in The Shadow (September 1937 – September 1938).

In 1938 Welles expanded the range of the Mercury Theatre from Broadway to network radio with his CBS series, The Mercury Theatre on the Air, and Stewart became his associate producer. In addition to playing a number of roles in the drama series and its sponsored continuation, The Campbell Playhouse, Stewart made significant contributions to the celebrated broadcast, "The War of the Worlds", as rehearsal director, actor and co-writer. Welles later said that Stewart deserved the largest share of the credit for the quality of "The War of the Worlds".

On January 14, 1939, in Arlington, Virginia, Stewart married actress and singer Peg LaCentra (1910–1996), a vocalist with Artie Shaw's first orchestra who worked in radio, films and television. That September Welles called Stewart in New York.

"The telephone rang and I heard the unmistakable voice of Orson Welles, speaking from California," Stewart recalled:

Well, when Orson said he had a part for you, you went. So I left New York to play my first role in a picture at 500 dollars a week, three weeks' guarantee. I was on Citizen Kane for 11 weeks. … My first shot was a close-up in which Orson wanted a special smoke effect from my cigarette. I was rigged with tube that went under my clothes and down my finger to the cigarette, but somehow the contraption wouldn't exude smoke. "I want long cigarettes – the Russian kind!" Orson ordered. Everyone waited while the prop man fetched some Russian cigarettes. Just before the scene Orson Welles warned me: "Your head is going to fill the screen at the Radio City Music Hall" – at that time Citizen Kane was booked for the Music Hall. Then he said in his gruff manner, "Turn 'em." But just before I started, he added quietly in his warm voice, "Good luck." I blew the first take. It was 30, 40 takes before I completed a shot that Orson liked – and I had only one line. That was almost 30 years ago, but even today I have people repeat it to me, including young students. The line was: "Rosebud … I'll tell you about Rosebud …"

Stewart's most famous role is his screen debut as Raymond, the cynical butler in Citizen Kane (1941). Actress Ruth Warrick, who portrayed Kane's first wife, remembered Stewart saying to her at the film's New York premiere, "From this night on, wherever we go or whatever we do in our lives, we will always be identified with Citizen Kane."

On the stage, Stewart appeared in the Mercury Theatre's acclaimed production of Native Son, directed by Welles and produced by John Houseman at the St. James Theatre March 24 – June 28, 1941.

During World War II Stewart served with the New York-based Office of War Information (1941–1943) and narrated documentaries including The World at War (1942). He worked under John Houseman at the newly created Voice of America (1942–1943), broadcasting news, editorials and commentary from the U.S. press, and quotes from notable speeches, to audiences in Europe. When Houseman took his oath of allegiance as a U.S. citizen in March 1943, he chose Stewart to accompany him as his witness.

Stewart was given leave to go to Hollywood to act in a few wartime films, including Mr. Lucky (1943), and worked as a barker in The Mercury Wonder Show, a magic-and-variety show produced by Welles and Joseph Cotten as a morale-boosting entertainment for U.S. soldiers. Because of his comprehensive radio experience, Stewart was called upon by U.S. Treasury Secretary Henry Morgenthau Jr. to prepare radio programs used to promote the purchase of War Bonds during World War II. He produced and directed Welles's Fifth War Loan broadcast from the Hollywood Bowl June 14, 1944, and produced, directed and acted in a number of patriotic episodes of the Cavalcade of America radio series.

After the war Stewart went to work for David O. Selznick and Dore Schary as a writer, director and producer, and directed screen tests for Paramount Pictures. Stewart's many feature film credits as an actor include The Window, Champion, Twelve O'Clock High, Deadline – U.S.A., The Bad and the Beautiful, The Juggler, Kiss Me Deadly, King Creole, In Cold Blood, The Day of the Locust and W.C. Fields and Me, in which he portrayed Florenz Ziegfeld.

In 1950 Stewart took over the role of Doc in Joshua Logan's Broadway production of Mister Roberts, starring Henry Fonda.

On television, Stewart's director credits include the syndicated series Top Secret (1954–1955), in which he costarred with the young Gena Rowlands, and a notable episode of The Twilight Zone, "Little Girl Lost" (1962). He was host, narrator and actor in the syndicated series Deadline (1959–1961) and appeared in episodes of The Ford Theatre Hour, Suspense, Playhouse 90, Alcoa Theatre, Alfred Hitchcock Presents, The Asphalt Jungle, Perry Mason, Dr. Kildare, Mannix, Mission Impossible, The Name of the Game ("L.A. 2017"), McMillan & Wife, Columbo, The Rockford Files, Lou Grant and Remington Steele, among many other TV series.

Orson Welles called upon Stewart to play a role in his film The Other Side of the Wind, shot in the 1970s and left unfinished until its release in 2018. When Welles died at his home in Hollywood on October 10, 1985, Stewart was the first of his friends to arrive.

Stewart died at the age of 77 of heart failure at Cedars-Sinai Medical Center in Los Angeles on February 17, 1986, after a long illness. He had suffered a heart attack in 1974 during the first two weeks' filming of Richard Brooks's Western, Bite the Bullet, in which he was replaced.

In the 1999 film RKO 281, Paul Stewart was portrayed by Adrian Schiller.

== Theatre credits ==
Date	Title	Role	Notes
1930 – May 1930	Subway Express	Passenger	Liberty Theatre, New York
October 9 – November 1931	Two Seconds	First Reporter, First Detective	Ritz Theatre, New York; Directed by Alexander Leftwich
January 26 – February 1932	East of Broadway	Willie Posner	Belmont Theatre, New York; Directed by Lew Levenson
May 6 – May 1932	Bulls, Bears and Asses	Merwin	Playhouse Theatre, New York; Directed by Melville Burke
February 21 – March 1938	Wine of Choice	Leo Traub	Guild Theatre, New York; Directed by Herman Shumlin
March 24 – June 28, 1941	Native Son	A Newspaper Man	St. James Theatre, New York; Directed by Orson Welles
September 24–29, 1941	Twilight Walk	—	Fulton Theatre, New York; Directed by Paul Stewart
August–September 1943	The Mercury Wonder Show	Barker	Hollywood, California; Directed by Orson Welles
May–December 1950	Mister Roberts	Doc	Alvin Theatre, New York; Directed by Joshua Logan
November 30, 1971 – January 8, 1972	The Caine Mutiny Court-Martial		Ahmanson Theatre, Los Angeles; Directed by Henry Fonda

== Radio credits ==
Paul Stewart played in or directed 5,000 radio and TV shows, usually without credit.

=== Actor ===
Date	Title	Role	Notes
1934–38	The March of Time	Repertory cast	
April 17 – December 25, 1935	The House of Glass	Whitey	
November 9, 1936 – June 25, 1937	The Jack Pearl Show	Announcer	
1936–37	Easy Aces	Johnny Sherwood	
September 26, 1937 – September 11, 1938	The Shadow	Repertory cast	
1938	The Raleigh and Kool Cigarette Program	Announcer	
1938–	Life Can Be Beautiful	Gyp Mendoza	
August 29, 1938	The Mercury Theatre on the Air	Paul Dantès	"The Count of Monte Cristo"
September 5, 1938	The Mercury Theatre on the Air	Gogol	"The Man Who Was Thursday"
October 30, 1938	The Mercury Theatre on the Air	Studio announcer Third studio announcer	"The War of the Worlds"
1939 –	Mr. District Attorney		
March 10, 1939	The Campbell Playhouse	Repertory cast	"The Glass Key"
May 5, 1939	The Campbell Playhouse		"Wickford Point"
May 20, 1939	Arch Oboler's Plays		"Crazytown"
May 25, 1939	The Campbell Playhouse		"Ah, Wilderness!"
September 17, 1939	The Campbell Playhouse		"American Cavalcade: The Things We Have"
January 9, 1940	The Cavalcade of America	Repertory cast	"The Raven Wins Texas"
February 11, 1940	The Campbell Playhouse		"Mr. Deeds Goes to Town"
April 6, 1941	The Free Company		"His Honor, the Mayor"
May 11, 1941	Twenty-Six by Corwin		"The Log of the R-77"
May 30, 1941	Great Moments from Great Plays		"The Butter and Egg Man"
June 22, 1941	Twenty-Six by Corwin		"Daybreak"
July 20, 1941	Twenty-Six by Corwin		"Double Concerto"
October 6, 1941	The Orson Welles Show		
November 3, 1941	The Orson Welles Show		"Wild Oranges"
1942–43	Voice of America		Medium wave English-language news broadcasts to Europe
March 28, 1942	This Is War		"It's in the Works"
April 6, 1942	The Cavalcade of America		"Yellow Jack"
May 4, 1942	The Cavalcade of America		"The Printer Was a Lady"
May 11, 1942	The Cavalcade of America		"A Tooth for Paul Revere"
July 27, 1942	The Cavalcade of America		"Man of Design"
August 3, 1942	The Cavalcade of America		"This Our Exile"
September 23, 1942	Suspense		"A Passage to Benares"
September 28, 1942	The Cavalcade of America		"Juarez: Thunder from the Mountains"
February 2, 1943	Lights Out		"Until Dead"
March 22, 1943	The Cavalcade of America		"Lifetide"
June 7, 1943	The Cavalcade of America		"The Enemy is Listening"
June 14, 1943	The Cavalcade of America		"Make Way for the Lady"
June 21, 1943	The Cavalcade of America		"The Unsinkable Marblehead"
August 17 – October 5, 1943	Passport for Adams		Eight 30-minute episodes
December 6, 1943	The Cavalcade of America		"Navy Doctor"
December 13, 1943	The Cavalcade of America		"Check Your Heart at Home"
1943–1944	Brave Tomorrow	Cast	
1946–	The Fat Man		
September 4, 1948	Gang Busters		"The Case of the Collector"
June 18, 1949	NBC University Theater of the Air		"What Makes Sammy Run?"
June 30, 1950	The MGM Theater of the Air		"Public Hero No. 1"
1950–51	Rogue's Gallery	Richard Rogue	55 episodes
January 10, 1954	NBC Star Playhouse		"For Whom the Bell Tolls"
November 7, 1954	You Were There		"Eight By Three By Two"
August 21, 1955	You Were There		"The Way We Want It"
August 28, 1955	You Were There		"Once Upon a Time"

=== Director, producer ===
Year	Title	Notes
July 11–December 4, 1938	The Mercury Theatre on the Air	Associate producer, rehearsal director 22 episodes
December 9, 1938 – March 31, 1940	The Campbell Playhouse	Associate producer, rehearsal director 56 episodes
1943–44	The Cavalcade of America	Producer and director of episodes including the following: "Navy Doctor", December 6, 1943 "Check Your Heart at Home", December 13, 1943 "U-Boat Prisoner", December 27, 1943 "Bullseye for Sammy", January 3, 1944 "Prelude to Glory", February 7, 1944 "The Purple Heart Comes to Free Meadows", February 21, 1944 "Junior Angel", February 28, 1944 "The Doctor Gets the Answer", September 11, 1944 "Spy on the Kilocycles", October 8, 1944 (director only)
June 14, 1944	The Fifth War Loan Drive	Producer, director Because of his comprehensive radio experience, Stewart was called upon by U.S. Treasury Secretary Henry Morgenthau Jr. to prepare radio programs used to promote the purchase of War Bonds during World War II

== Film and television credits ==
=== Actor ===
Year	Title	Role	Notes
1937	Ever Since Eve	Cocktail Customer	Uncredited
1940	Citizen Kane trailer	Himself, Raymond	Short
1941	Citizen Kane	Raymond	Film debut
1942	Johnny Eager	Julio	
1942	The World at War	Narrator	First documentary released by the Office of War Information
1943	Mr. Lucky	Zepp	
1944	Government Girl	Branch Owens	
1948	Berlin Express	Narrator	Voice, uncredited
1949	Champion	Tommy Haley	
1949	The Window	Joe Kellerson	
1949	Illegal Entry	Zack Richards	
1949	Easy Living	Dan Argus	
1949	The Ford Theatre Hour	Paul Lawton	TV series, "She Loves Me Not"
1949	Twelve O'Clock High	Captain [Major] "Doc" Kaiser	
1950	Suspense	Sam Cragg	TV series, "1000 to One"
1950	Edge of Doom	Craig	
1950	Walk Softly, Stranger	Whitey Lake	
1950	The Prudential Family Playhouse	Max Wharton	TV series, "Over 21"
1951	Appointment with Danger	Earl Boettinger	
1951	Lights Out		TV series, "The Man with the Astrakhan Hat"
1951	Faith Baldwin Romance Theatre		TV series, "Success Story"
1952	Deadline – U.S.A.	Harry Thompson	
1952	Carbine Williams	"Dutch" Kruger	
1952	Loan Shark	Lou Donelli	
1952	We're Not Married!	Stone, Eve's lawyer	
1952	The Bad and the Beautiful	Syd Murphy	
1953	The Juggler	Detective Karni	
1953	The Joe Louis Story	Tad McGeehan	
1954	Prisoner of War	Captain Jack Hodges	
1954	Deep in My Heart	Bert Townsend	
1954	Inner Sanctum		TV series, 3 episodes
1954–1955	Top Secret	Professor Brand	TV series, 26-episode syndicated series costarring Gena Rowlands
1955	Kiss Me Deadly	Carl Evello	
1955	The Cobweb	Dr. Otto Wolff	
1955	Chicago Syndicate	Arnold Valenti	
1955	TV Reader's Digest	Larry Sears	TV series, "The Manufactured Clue"
1955	1955 Motion Picture Theatre Celebration	Himself	
1956	Hell on Frisco Bay	Joe Lye	
1956	Playhouse 90	Martin Hoeffer	TV series, "Confession"
1956	The Wild Party	Ben Davis	
1957	Top Secret Affair	Phil Bentley	
1957	The Joseph Cotten Show	Mr. Bari	TV series, "The Secret of Polanta"
1958	King Creole	Charlie Le Grand	
1958	Alcoa Theatre	Don Peters	TV series, "The First Star"
1958	No Warning	Stephen Chase	TV series, "Fingerprints"
1959	Beyond All Limits	Pendergast	
1959–1961	Deadline	Narrator, host	TV series, syndicated newspaper anthology series
1960	Alfred Hitchcock Presents	Vincent Noonan	Season 5 Episode 23: "Craig's Will"
1961	The Asphalt Jungle	Alex Meridan	TV series, "The Kidnapping"
1963	A Child is Waiting	Goodman	
1964	Perry Mason	J.J. Pennington	TV series, "The Case of the Tragic Trophy"
1964	Dr. Kildare	Dr. Giuseppe Muretelli	TV series, "Rome Will Never Leave You"
1965	The Greatest Story Ever Told	Questor	
1966	Perry Mason	Cameron Burgess	TV series, "The Case of the Avenging Angel"
1966–1967	The Man Who Never Was	Paul Grant	TV series
1967	In Cold Blood	Jensen, Reporter	
1967–1969	Moby Dick and Mighty Mightor	Mightor	voice role, TV series, animated series
1968	Jigsaw	Simon Joshua	
1968	Mannix	Morgan Farrell	TV series, "Pressure Point"
1969	How to Commit Marriage	Willoughby, Attorney	
1969	Ironside	Paul Cambridge	TV series, "The Prophesy"
1969	Mission: Impossible	Jonas Stone	TV series, "Mastermind"
1970	Carter's Army	General Clark	TV movie; also known as Black Brigade
1970	The Governor & J.J.	Dr. Ed Graham	TV series, "And the World Begat the Bleep"
1970	Gunsmoke	Sanders	TV series, "The Cage"
1971	The Silent Force		TV series, "The Banker"
1971	The Name of the Game	Dr. Rubias	TV series, "L.A. 2017"
1971	City Beneath the Sea	Barton	TV movie
1971	McMillan & Wife	Chief Andy Yeakel	TV series, "Husbands, Wives and Killers"
1972	Fabulous Trinity	Charles	
1973	Ironside	Ben Hopkins	TV series, "Ring of Prayer"
1973	The F.B.I.	Reese	TV series, "Rules of the Game"
1973	Columbo	Clifford Paris	TV series, "Double Shock"
1974	F for Fake	Special participant	
1974	Cannon	Lester Cain	TV series, "The Hit Man"
1975	The Streets of San Francisco	Nick Lugo	TV series, "Letters from the Grave"
1975	Bite the Bullet	J.B. Parker	Uncredited
1975	The Day of the Locust	Helverston	
1975	Murph the Surf	Avery	Also known as Live A Little, Steal A Lot
1976	W.C. Fields and Me	Flo Ziegfeld	
1977	The Rockford Files	Julius "Buddy" Richards	TV series, "Irving the Explainer"
1977	Opening Night	David Samuels	
1978	The Dain Curse	Old Man	TV miniseries
1978	Revenge of the Pink Panther	Julio Scallini	
1978	The Nativity	Zacharias	
1979	Lou Grant	Kenneth Homes	TV series, "Hollywood"
1981	S.O.B.	Harry Sandler	
1981	Nobody's Perfekt	Dr. Segal	
1982	Tempest	Phillip's father	
1983	Remington Steele	Joseph Barber	TV series, "Steele Knuckles and Glass Jaws"
1985	MacGyver	Dr. Carl Steubens	TV series, pilot episode
2018	The Other Side of the Wind	Matt Costello	Scenes filmed between 1970 and 1976

=== Director, producer ===
Year	Title	Notes
1954–1955	Top Secret (TV series)	15-minute syndicated series, also known as Top Secret U.S.A. "I also directed my own TV series in the East … We did 26 films in 25 days, so you can see I'm used to making deadlines" (Paul Stewart)
1955	Kings Row (TV series)	Three episodes
1955–1956	Warner Bros. Presents (TV series)	Three episodes
1957	Meet McGraw (TV series)	"The White Rose"
1958	Decision (TV series)	"Man on a Raft" (or "Three Men on a Raft")
1958	Peter Gunn (TV series)	"The Leaper"
1959–1960	Hawaiian Eye (TV series)	"Secret of the Second Door" "Shipment from Kihei" "The Koa Man" "Stamped for Danger"
1960	M Squad (TV series)	Five episodes
1960	Philip Marlowe (TV series)	"Murder is a Grave Affair"
1960–1961	Michael Shayne (TV series)	Eight episodes; associate producer of the series
1961–1962	Checkmate (TV series)	Six episodes
1962	The Twilight Zone (TV series)	"Little Girl Lost"
