= Captain David Grief =

- Also known as: The Jack London Stories
- Genre: Action/Adventure
- Starring: Maxwell Reed
- Country of origin: United States
- Original language: English
- No. of seasons: 2
- No. of episodes: 39

Production
- Producers: Sidney T. Bruckner; Duke Goldstone
- Camera setup: Single-camera
- Running time: 25 mins.

Original release
- Network: Syndication
- Release: October 3, 1957 – 1960

Captain David Grief (also known as The Jack London Stories) is an American action/adventure television series that aired in syndication from October 1957 to 1960. The program was based on a series of Jack London short-stories centered on the South Seas tradesman and adventurer David Grief, collected in A Son of the Sun.

== Overview ==
Captain David Grief was a half-hour filmed series.

The cast included the Irish-born actor Maxwell Reed as Captain Grief, Tudor Owen as Elihu Snow, Mickey Simpson as Boley, Mel Prestidge as Jackie-Jackie, and Maureen Hingert as Anura. Stuart Heisler was the director, and the producer was Duke Goldstone.

Captain David Grief ran for two seasons with a total of 39 episodes. The first nine episodes were shot in Hawaii. The production later moved to southern California and then Cuba, before the final episodes were shot in Mexico. The series was distributed by Guild Films.

The program was the first TV series to be filmed on location in Hawaii. The three-masted barquentine California was used for scenes shot aboard ship. It was renamed The Rattler in the show. The Pioneer Inn in Lahaina, Hawaii, was used for scenes filmed on land.

The program's budget was $1,912,000. Sponsors varied by region of the country. As of February 1957, they included West End Brewing Company, Utica, New York; Stroh Brewery, Detroit; Pearl Brewing Company, Texas; Standard Oil of California; and D-X Sunray Oil, Tulsa.

== Guest stars ==
Among the series guest stars were boxers Rocky Marciano and Buddy Baer. Other guest stars include:

- Allison Hayes
- Ruta Lee
- Lois Nettleton
- J. Pat O'Malley

== Critical response ==
A review in the trade publication Variety found that the program's "beautiful color" and "beautiful scenery" were offset by a "script that was most ordinary". Although the original story was by Jack London, the program's writers "showed their grasp of corny dialog". Overall, the review found the show to be "adequate . . . to fill the demands of the syndication-starved tv stations around the country."
