= Poncie Ponce =

American actor and entertainer (1933–2013)

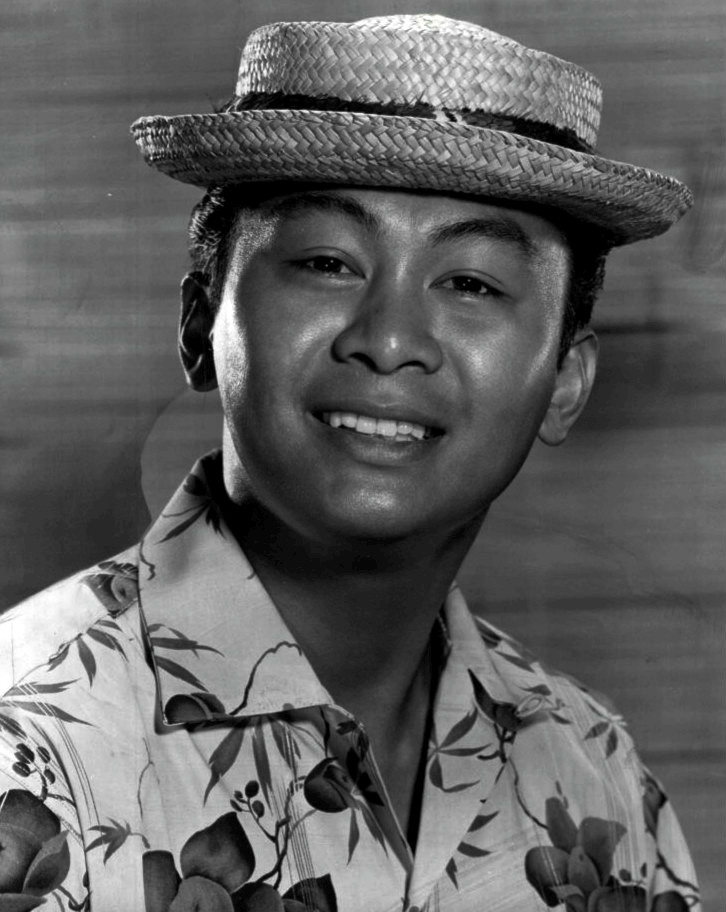
- Ponce in 1959
- Born: Ponciano Tabac Hernandez; April 10, 1933; Maui, Hawaii
- Died: July 19, 2013 (aged 80); Los Angeles, California, U.S.
- Other name: Poncie Ponce
- Occupations: Vocalist; Actor; Musician; Stand-Up Comedian; Impressionist
- Years active: 1953–2013
- Spouse: Sherry Luke (m. July 21, 1956)

Poncie Ponce (born Ponciano Tabac Hernandez; April 10, 1933 – July 19, 2013) was an American actor, musician and stand-up comedian. Born in Maui, Hawaii, he moved to Los Angeles, where from 1959 to 1963 he played the role of cab driver Kazuo Kim in the Warner Bros. detective series Hawaiian Eye on the ABC television network. In 1961, Ponce was at the forefront of a growing national interest in martial arts when he opened a karate studio in North Hollywood.

== Early life ==
Ponciano Tabac Hernandez was born one of seven surviving children in Maui, Hawaii on April 10, 1933, to Maria (née Tabac) and Alfredo Hernandez. He attended Honokaa High School in Honokaa, Hawaii, and pursued a career as a welder at Hawaii Vocational School.

However, he was drafted and served for two years in the United States Army. Deployed to Germany in 1953, Ponce honed his artistic talents in Munich's clubs. Drawn to a career in entertainment, upon return to civilian life Ponce made the rounds of Hawaii's local talent contests and television and radio stations. Encouraged by Hawaii tourist audiences, Ponce decided to try his luck in Los Angeles.

== Discovery and stardom ==
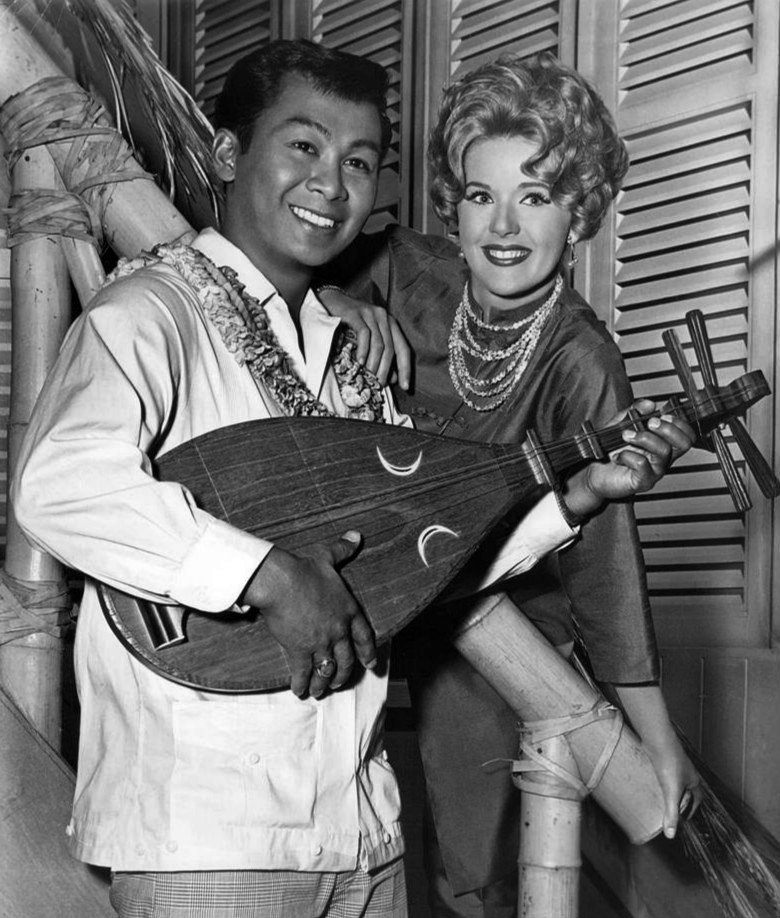
Ponce and Connie Stevens, 1961.

Los Angeles automobile dealer Bob Yeakel broadcast an 18-hour weekly amateur talent show called Rocket to Stardom from his Wilshire Boulevard showroom. The broadcast was split over two local stations, KHJ-TV Channel 9 and KTTV-TV Channel 11. Ponce made a series of appearances on the local show in the late 1950s and was soon working at Ben Blue's Santa Monica night club. Warner Bros. executives William T. Orr and Hugh Benson happened to catch his act at Ben Blue's and thought he might be a good fit for their new production Hawaiian Eye. There was one stipulation to the contract, that he change his name to Poncie Ponce. Jack L. Warner changed his name to Ponce.

Ponce came to national attention in 1959 as the wise-cracking cab driver Kazuo Kim on the Warner Bros. detective series Hawaiian Eye, which ran for four years on ABC. Kazuo Kim was known for his trademark straw hat and ukulele, sometimes as an informant for the detectives and at other times simply playing his ukulele while leaning against his cab waiting for fares. The show's introduction showed Kazuo Kim floating in the ocean on an inner tube, wearing the hat and plucking his ukulele.

== Films and club dates ==
The show led to parts in a handful of films, most notably as part of a stock car racing pit crew on Elvis Presley's team in the 1968 Speedway.

Hawaiian Eye provided opportunities for Ponce that continued after the show ended to perform and make personal appearances around the globe. In 1963, Ponce joined the promotional staff of television station HSV 7 in Melbourne, Australia. Beginning December 29, 1964, Ponce began a four-week engagement at the Checkers Club in Sydney, Australia. In February 1965, Ponce played the Getsusekai club in Tokyo. June 9–16, 1965, Ponce was appearing on radio and television in Buenos Aires. Ponce, who lived in California, sometimes entertained at events in Las Vegas. Long after the show ended, Ponce was booked at nostalgia events.

== Recordings ==
The television show also opened opportunities for Ponce to record for Warner Bros. Records. In 1961, Warner Bros. released Ponce's single Ten Cent Perfume / No Huhu. Billboard magazine gave the single a three-star rating for "Moderate sales potential". The magazine explained its three-star rating as, "...these frequently will be of interest for disk jockey programming." In 1962, Warner Bros released the album Poncie Ponce Sings. Billboard gave the album a four-star "Strong Sales Potential" rating, saying, "He does his best work on novelties."

== Later years ==
In 2000, Ponce underwent heart surgery. That same year, he made an appearance at a Pacific Pioneer Broadcasters luncheon honoring his friend and former co-star Connie Stevens, where the two old friends sang the Hawaiian Wedding Song. In 2006, Ponce, who was home on Maui for a high school reunion, gave locals a thrill by performing an impromptu jam with stand-up comic Augie T. After retiring, Ponce spent time with Sherry Luke Ponce, his wife of over five decades, as well as his three daughters and his grandchildren. He died on July 19, 2013, at 80.

== Discography ==
- Hawaiian Eye (soundtrack) (1960) Warner Bros. 1355, (2006) re-released, Collectibles 7779
- Ten Cent Perfume / No Huhu (1961) Warner Bros. single 5244
- Poncie Ponce Sings (1962) Warner Bros. W5-1453

== Filmography ==
- Portrait of a Mobster (1961)
- Speedway (1968)
- The World's Greatest Lover (1977)
- G.I. Joe: The Movie (1987)

== Television appearances ==
- 77 Sunset Strip (1959–1960)
- The Gallant Men (1963)
- Hawaiian Eye (1959–1963)
- The Red Skelton Hour (1953–1963)
- The Woody Woodbury Show (1968)
- Family Feud (1983)
- Michael Nesmith in Television Parts (1985)
- Doctor Duck's Super Secret All-Purpose Sauce (1986)
