= Douglas Mossman =

American actor (1933–2021)

- Publicity Photo of Douglas Mossman
- Born: Douglas Kinilau Mossman; April 7, 1933
- Died: May 18, 2021 (aged 88)

Douglas Kinilau Mossman, also credited as Doug Mossman (April 7, 1933 – May 18, 2021) was an American actor known for his recurring role as Detective Frank Kamana on the original Hawaii Five-O from 1974 to 1975. In addition to playing the role of Kamana, Mossman played twelve additional characters during the series 12 year run (27 episodes). He also had a recurring role as police officer Moke on Hawaiian Eye (119 episodes), as well as appearing in other productions shot in Hawaii.

== Biography ==
Mossman was of Hawaiian ancestry and was a 1950 graduate of Kamehameha Schools. He served in the Hawaii Army National Guard for six years where he saw action in the Korean War and graduated from Officer's Candidate School as an infantry officer.

The G.I. Bill paid for his training at the Pasadena Playhouse College of Theater Arts where he graduated in 1958. Hawaiian Eye gave him his first TV role as Moke, a security guard. He also acted as a Hawaiian technical adviser with the show.

In addition to Frank Kamana, Mossman had numerous other roles during the run of Hawaii Five-O, though according to the Honolulu Star-Bulletin, he left the show to create the TV series West Wind, which ran for one season. He has also appeared in other Hawaii-based series: Magnum, P.I., Jake and the Fatman, One West Waikiki, and Hawaii in addition to The Jeffersons.

In addition to acting, Mossman was an entertainer and emcee for Chuck Machado's Luau at the Outrigger Waikiki from 1970 to 1990 and general manager of IMAX Theaters in Waikiki from 1991 to 1999. As of 2003, the Honolulu Star-Bulletin also reported that Mossman was looking for a sculptor and space to create a statue of Hawaii Five-O’s leading man Jack Lord in addition to developing a performing arts center in Mililani Mauka.

He also appeared in the rebooted Hawaii Five-0 in 2011, playing the role of Kimo Halama in the season two episode "Ki’ilua".

== Death ==
Mossman died in Ewa, Hawaii, on May 18, 2021, at the age of 88.

== Partial filmography ==
- I Sailed to Tahiti with an All Girl Crew (1968) - Island chief
- Inferno in Paradise (1974) - Lt. Hayden
