= Mel Prestidge =

American police officer and television actor

- Prestidge in Hawaiian Eye, c. 1960
- Born: Melvin Prestidge; November 20, 1928; Hawaii, U.S.
- Died: January 25, 2011 (aged 82); Panorama City, Los Angeles, U.S.
- Occupations: Police officer, television actor
- Years active: 1956–1978
- Spouse: Evangeline Prestidge
- Children: 5

Melvin Prestidge (November 20, 1928 – January 25, 2011) was an American police officer and television actor. He was known for playing the roles of Lt. Danny Quon in the American detective television series Hawaiian Eye and Jackie-Jackie in the syndicated television series Captain David Grief. Before he began his acting career, he worked as a police officer in Los Angeles County, California. He also worked on Warner Bros. sound stages.

Prestidge died on January 25, 2011, in Panorama City, Los Angeles, at the age of 82.
