= Hawaiian Eye =

American television series

- Robert Conrad, Connie Stevens, Anthony Eisley, and Poncie Ponce in Hawaiian Eye
- Created by: Roy Huggins
- Starring: Anthony Eisley; Robert Conrad; Connie Stevens; Poncie Ponce; Grant Williams; Troy Donahue
- Theme music composer: Jerry Livingston; Mack David
- Opening theme: "The Hawaiian Eye Theme" performed by Warren Barker
- Country of origin: United States
- No. of seasons: 4
- No. of episodes: 134 (list of episodes)

Production
- Executive producer: William T. Orr
- Producers: Stanley Niss; Charles Hoffman; Ed Jurist; Oren W. Haglund (Production manager)
- Production locations: Oahu, Hawaii; California
- Running time: 60 minutes
- Production company: Warner Bros. Television

Original release
- Network: ABC
- Release: October 7, 1959 – April 2, 1963

Related
- 77 Sunset Strip; Bourbon Street Beat; Surfside 6

Hawaiian Eye is an American detective television series that ran from October 1959 to April 1963 on the ABC television network.

== Premise ==
Private investigator Tracy Steele (Anthony Eisley) and his half-Hawaiian partner, Tom Lopaka (Robert Conrad), own Hawaiian Eye, a combination detective agency and private security firm, located in Honolulu, Hawaii. Their principal client is the Hawaiian Village Hotel, which in exchange for security services, provides the agency with a luxurious private compound on the hotel grounds. The partners investigate mysteries and protect clients with the sometime help of photographer Cricket Blake (Connie Stevens), who also sings at the hotel's Shell Bar, and a ukulele-playing cab driver Kim Quisado (Poncie Ponce), who has connections throughout the islands. Engineer turned detective Greg McKenzie (Grant Williams), joins the agency later on as a full partner, while hotel social director Philip Barton (Troy Donahue) lends a hand after Tracy Steele departs.

== Background and run ==
Hawaiian Eye was one of several ABC/Warner Bros. Television detective series of the era situated in different exotic locales. Others included Hollywood-based 77 Sunset Strip, Bourbon Street Beat set in New Orleans, and Miami's Surfside 6. In reality, all were shot on the Warner Bros. backlot in Burbank, California, making crossovers easy for characters and sometimes whole scripts. Although the shows are not spin-offs in the traditional sense, 77 Sunset Strip was the first in this chain of "exotic-location detective series". In this regard, Hawaiian Eye was the most viable of these look-alikes, lasting four seasons. The show's debut coincided with several real-world developments that helped contribute to its longevity. These were the granting of statehood to Hawaii, the advent of mass tourism to the new state brought about by the introduction of jetliners for commercial passenger flights, and the promotional efforts of Henry J. Kaiser, whose real-estate projects in Honolulu included building the hotel complex originally known as Kaiser's Hawaiian Village (later the Hilton Hawaiian Village Hotel).

== Cast ==
The series regulars, who were shown during the opening credits, are listed below in the order in which they debuted during the show's four-year run.

Character	Actor	Role	Seasons
Thomas Jefferson "Tom" Lopaka	Robert Conrad	Private investigator	1959–1963
Tracy Steele	Anthony Eisley	Private investigator	1959–1962
Chryseis "Cricket" Blake	Connie Stevens	Photographer and singer	1959–1963
Kazuo "Kim" Quisado	Poncie Ponce	Cab driver	1959–1963
Greg McKenzie	Grant Williams	Private investigator	1960–1963
Philip Barton	Troy Donahue	Hotel social director	1962–1963

=== Recurring characters ===
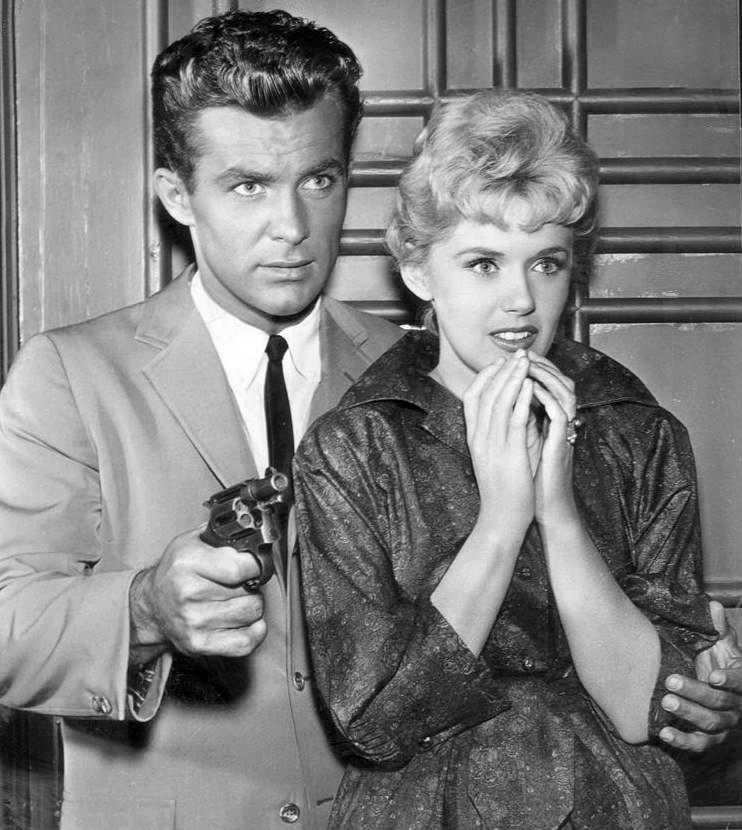
Robert Conrad and Connie Stevens, 1960

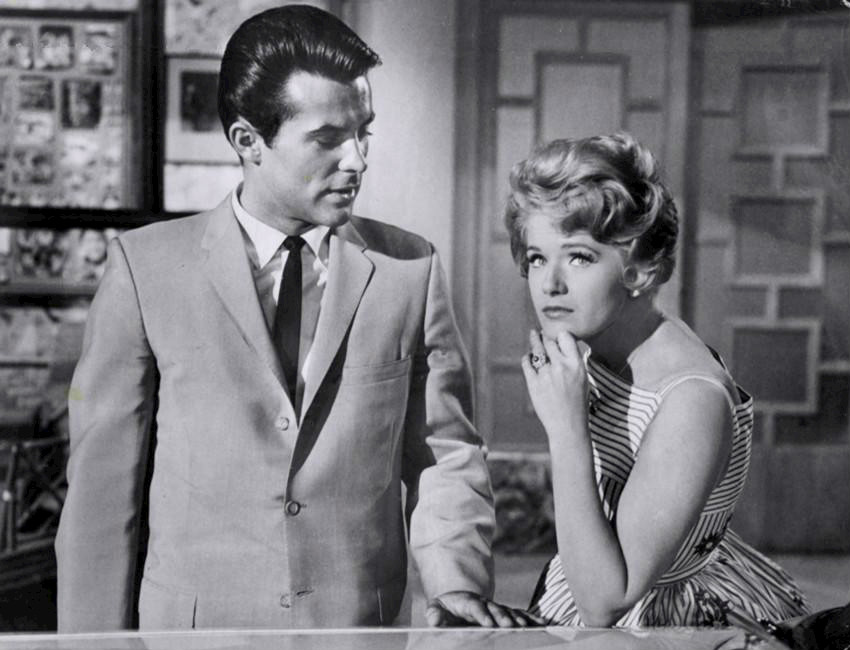
Robert Conrad and Connie Stevens, 1961

- Lt. Danny Quon, played by Mel Prestidge, was the Hawaiian Eye's main contact with the Honolulu Police Department.
- Moke, played by Douglas Mossman, was the chief uniformed security officer for Hawaiian Eye. He went by several variant names in the first season before the writers finally settled on one.
- Paul, played by Andre Philippe, was the master of ceremonies at the Shell Bar in the Hawaiian Village Hotel.
- Bert, played by Sam Rawlins, was the doorman at the Hawaiian Village Hotel.
- Teo, played by several actors including Ralph Hanalei and Keone, was a uniformed security guard for the Hawaiian Eye agency.
- Roy Hondine, played by Rush Williams, was a columnist for a major Honolulu newspaper.
- Sunny Day, played by Tina Cole, was a singer at the Shell Bar. The role was created after Connie Stevens temporarily left the series in the fourth season over a contract dispute.
- Sgt. Alika, played by Makee K. Blaisdell, was a detective for the Hilo police force and appeared in several episodes that took place on the big island of Hawaii.
- Bubbles Smith, played by Karen Griffin, was a temporary girlfriend of Tom Lopaka's in several second-season episodes.

=== Guest musical acts ===
All of the Warner Bros. detective shows of this era featured a musical interlude, generally performed by a series regular. On occasion, Hawaiian Eye had a guest act perform:

- Sterling Mossman and his Barefoot Bar Gang: A real policeman by day, Sterling also performed nights at the Barefoot Bar, one of Honolulu's most popular tourist attractions from 1952–1969.
- Arthur Lyman and his exotic tropical sounds: In the episode "An Echo of Honor", Connie Stevens sang a version of the title song accompanied by Lyman's group.

== Legacy ==
Hawaiian Eye became the precursor in a long list of other crime action-drama detective and police procedural television shows based in and around Hawaii, including Hawaii Five-O and its reboot series, Magnum, P.I. and its reboot series, Hawaiian Heat, One West Waikiki, Hawaii, and NCIS: Hawai'i.

== In other media ==
- A limited amount of spin-off material accompanied the series. Gold Key published a single comic book, Hawaiian Eye #1, in 1963, which detailed an adventure of Cricket and Phil Barton. In 1962, a single novelization by Frank Castle also appeared on bookshelves in America.
- A Warner Bros. Music record of the show featured some songs performed by Stevens and Robert Conrad, a rerecording of the title song and some Warner stock music.

== In popular culture ==
- The series was parodied in a 1962 episode of The Flintstones in season three's "Hawaiian Escapade", billed as "Hawaiian Spy" with Wilma and Betty as huge fans of the show, in particularly over its hunky lead star, Larry Lava; they win a contest to be on the set of the production shot on Hawaiirock's Rockiki Beach (a parody on Waikīkī Beach) in the show's promotional contest.
- The show was also parodied in Bob Clampett's cartoon series Beany And Cecil in an episode entitled "Hawaiian Eyeball".

== Episode list ==
See List of Hawaiian Eye episodes
