= Heatherton =

Heatherton may refer to:

== Places ==
- Heatherton Village, a suburb of Derby, England
- Heatherton, Michigan (also spelled Hetherton), United States
- Heatherton, Newfoundland and Labrador, Canada
- Heatherton, Nova Scotia, Canada
- Heatherton, Victoria, Australia

== Other uses ==
- Heatherton (surname)

== See also ==
- The Joey Heatherton Album
