= Heatherton (surname) =

Heatherton is a surname. Notable people with the surname include:

- Erin Heatherton (born 1989), American model
- Joey Heatherton (born 1944), American actress, dancer, and singer, daughter of Ray
- Ray Heatherton (1909–1997), American singer
- Todd Heatherton, American psychologist
