= Sam Leavitt (cinematographer) =

American cinematographer (1904–1984)

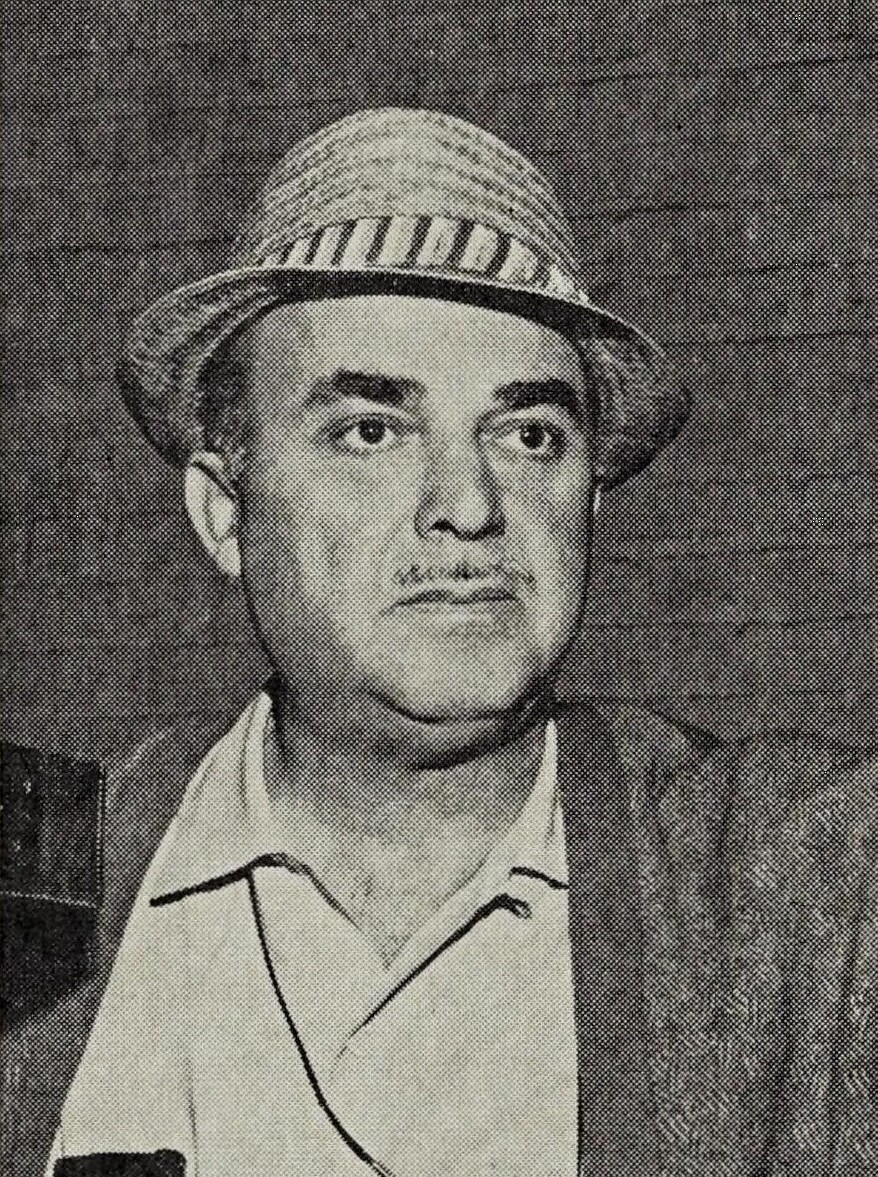
- Leavitt c. 1962
- Born: February 6, 1904; New York City
- Died: March 21, 1984 (aged 80); Woodland Hills, California
- Occupation: Cinematographer
- Years active: 1932 - 1978

Samuel Leavitt, A.S.C. (February 6, 1904 – March 21, 1984), was an American cinematographer nominated for three Academy Awards, winning one for The Defiant Ones (1958).

Leavitt began his career as an assistant camera operator working on 1930s films. Leavitt was a camera operator on films including Rancho Notorious (1952) and on TV's I Love Lucy in the early 1950s before becoming a director of photography in films.

Leavitt was nominated for the Academy Awards in Best Cinematography Color for Exodus (1960) and Best Cinematography Black and White for Anatomy of a Murder (1959) in the two years following his Oscar win for The Defiant Ones.

Leavitt was born in New York City and died in Woodland Hills, California.

== Filmography ==
Feature films

- The Thief (1952)
- China Venture (1953)
- Mission Over Korea (1953)
- A Star Is Born (1954)
- Carmen Jones (1954)
- Southwest Passage (1954)
- An Annapolis Story (1955)
- The Court-Martial of Billy Mitchell (1955)
- The Man with the Golden Arm (1955)
- The Bold and the Brave (1956)
- Crime in the Streets (1956)
- Hot Rod Girl (1956)
- The Wild Party (1956)
- The Careless Years (1957)
- Eighteen and Anxious (1957)
- Hell Ship Mutiny (1957)
- Time Limit (1957)
- The Defiant Ones (1958)
- The Fearmakers (1958)
- Anatomy of a Murder (1959)
- The Crimson Kimono (1959)
- Five Gates to Hell (1959)
- Pork Chop Hill (1959)
- Exodus (1960)
- Seven Thieves (1960)
- The Right Approach (1961)
- Advise & Consent (1962)
- Cape Fear (1962)
- Diamond Head (1963)
- Shock Treatment (1964)
- Brainstorm (1965)
- Dr. Goldfoot and the Bikini Machine (1965)
- Major Dundee (1965)
- My Blood Runs Cold (1965)
- Two on a Guillotine (1965)
- An American Dream (1966)
- I Deal in Danger (1966)
- Murderers' Row (1966)
- Guess Who's Coming to Dinner (1967)
- Where Angels Go, Trouble Follows (1968)
- The Wrecking Crew (1968)
- The Desperados (1969)
- The Man in the Glass Booth (1975)

Short films

- Goof on the Roof (1953)

Television films

- Evil Roy Slade (1972)
- The Longest Night (1972)
- The Screaming Woman (1972)
