= An American Dream (film) =

1966 film by Robert Gist

- film poster
- Directed by: Robert Gist
- Screenplay by: Mann Rubin
- Based on: An American Dream by Norman Mailer
- Produced by: William Conrad (executive producer); Jimmy Lydon (uncredited)
- Starring: Stuart Whitman; Janet Leigh; Eleanor Parker
- Cinematography: Sam Leavitt
- Edited by: George R. Rohrs
- Music by: Johnny Mandel
- Production company: William Conrad Productions
- Distributed by: Warner Bros. Pictures
- Release date: August 31, 1966; (New York)
- Running time: 103 minutes
- Country: United States
- Language: English

An American Dream (also known as See You in Hell, Darling) is a 1966 American Technicolor drama film directed by Robert Gist and starring Stuart Whitman and Janet Leigh. It was adapted from the 1965 Norman Mailer novel of the same name. The film received an Oscar nomination for Best Song for "A Time for Love," music by Johnny Mandel and lyrics by Paul Francis Webster.

== Plot ==
Stephen Rojack, a war hero, returns home to become a tough-talking television commentator who strongly criticizes the police's inability to put an end to the criminal activities of Ganucci, an organized-crime figure.

Separated from his alcoholic wife Deborah, he goes to her seeking a divorce. A violent argument breaks out, ending with Rojack throwing her from a 30th-story window.

At the police station, where he tells the police his wife committed suicide, Rojack runs into Ganucci as well as the gangster's nephew Nicky and nightclub singer Cherry McMahon, a former girlfriend of his. Rojack resumes his romantic interest in Cherry, further infuriating the Ganuccis.

Barney Kelly, his dead wife's father, is suspicious about Deborah's death and confronts Rojack, getting him to admit his guilt. Instead of informing the police, Barney decides to let Rojack struggle with his conscience.

Meanwhile, bribing her with a singing contract, the Ganuccis are able to convince Cherry to lure Rojack into an ambush. At the last second, she breaks down and warns him. Rojack takes her gun and is able to shoot Nicky, but then is gunned down himself.

== Cast ==
- Stuart Whitman as Stephen Richard Rojack
- Janet Leigh as Cherry McMahon (singing voice was dubbed by Jackie Ward)
- Eleanor Parker as Deborah Rojack
- Barry Sullivan as Lt. Roberts
- Lloyd Nolan as Barney Kelly
- Murray Hamilton as Arthur Kabot
- J. D. Cannon as Sgt. Walt Leznicki
- Susan Denberg as Ruta
- Les Crane as Nicky
- Peter Marko as Hoodlum
- Warren Stevens as Johnny Dell
- Joe De Santis as Eddie Ganucci
- Stacy Harris as O'Brien
- Paul Mantee as Shago Martin
- Harold Gould as Ganucci's Attorney
- George Takei as Ord Long
- Kelly Jean Peters as Freya
- Hal K. Dawson as Apartment House Guard (uncredited)
- Richard Derr as Undetermined Role (uncredited)
- James Nolan as Monsignor (uncredited)

== Production ==
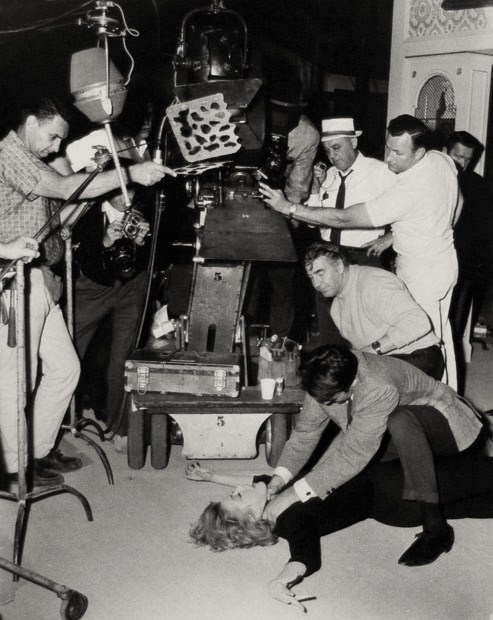
Publicity still from the set of An American Dream: Eleanor Parker and Stuart Whitman (actors), Robert Gist (director, behind them) and Sam Leavitt (cinematographer, in white hat)

When An American Dream bombed at the box office, the desperate distributors re-titled the film See You in Hell, Darling.

== Reception ==
The director intended to make a horror movie, but failed to create that effect: According to Time Out magazine, it turns out to be "just tediously violent".

In his book, The American Cinema, critic Andrew Sarris reported that "An American Dream can be described with some affection as the worst film of its year." And yet, "Robert Gist's direction lingers in the mind in spite of, or because of, this very misalliance."

== See also ==
- List of American films of 1966
