= The Hermit's Cave =

Syndicated radio horror series

The Hermit's Cave was a syndicated radio horror series. The syndication was done via scripts, so that stations could broadcast the program with their own casts.

Created by Mr. and Mrs. Eric Howlett, the program began in September 1937 and continued into the mid-1940s on WJR AM in Detroit, Michigan. In 1942, WJR's broadcasts of the show were recorded and broadcast a week later on WBBM in Chicago, Illinois. By 1943, transcriptions of the WJR version of the program were also being broadcast in eight additional cities.

KMPC AM in Los Angeles, California, broadcast it from 1940 to 1944, with William Conrad as producer. Over 800 episodes were produced but fewer than 40 are currently available.

Show sponsors included the Carter Coal Company which advertised its home-heating coal product, Olga Coal, and the Simoniz Company which promoted its various automotive care products like Simoniz Cleaner.

The Hermit's Cave was narrated by the character, the Hermit, with a majority of episodes beginning with the following dialogue:

Ghost stories! Weird stories. And murders, too! The Hermit knows of them all! Turn out your lights. Turn them out, and listen while the Hermit tells you ...

Throughout the years, the voice of the Hermit was provided by various actors beginning with John Kent and later by Charles Penman, Toby Grimmer, Klock Ryder, Mel Johnson, and John Dehner.

In January 1950, The Hermit's Cave returned to WJR.

== Select list of episodes ==
- "Buried Alive"
- "Castle By The Sea"
- "Fever"
- "Footprints In The Snow"
- "From Another World"
- "Hanson's Ghost"
- "House Of Madness"
- "Inheritance"
- "It Happened On Sunday"
- "Living Or Dead"
- "Marked Hours"
- "Mr. Randall's Discovery"
- "Mysterious Return"
- "Notebook On Murder"
- "Plantation Mystery"
- "Reflected Image"
- "Sea Wolf"
- "Spirit Vengeance"
- "Spirits Of Vengeance"
- "The Author Of Murder"
- "The Black Band"
- "The Blackness Of Terror"
- "The Crimson Hand"
- "The Devil Dog"
- "The Guilty One"
- "The Gypsy's Curse"
- "The Haunted Theater"
- "The House Of Murder"
- "The House Of Purple Shadows"
- "The House On Lost Man's Bluff"
- "The House With A Past"
- "The Lost Black Crow Mine"
- "The Man With White Hair"
- "The Mystery Of The Thing"
- "The Nameless Day"
- "The Omen From The Sea"
- "The Possessed"
- "The Professor's Elixir"
- "The Search For Life"
- "The Sound That Never Ends"
- "The Unseen Force"
- "The Vampire's Desire"
- "The Will In The Book"
- "Without End"
- "You Only Die Once"

== Song samples ==
Songs such as Natalie Wood and Tick Tock (by TV Girl and AKA-P, formerly redseas07 respectively) sample The Hermit's Cave with the following line:

"We have a very absorbing story of a girl who was forced into a game of terror. In which the dice were loaded with..."
