= Joey Heatherton =

American actress, dancer, and singer (born 1944)

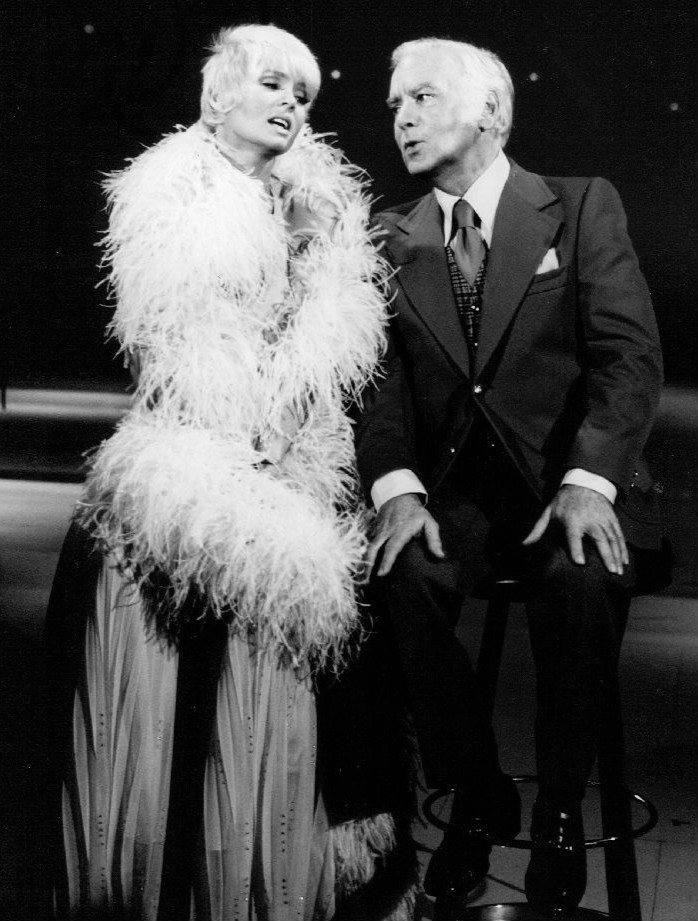
- Heatherton and her father Ray performing on their variety show "Joey and Dad" in 1975
- Born: Davenie Johanna Heatherton; September 14, 1944 (age 81); Rockville Centre, New York, U.S.
- Education: Saint Agnes Academy
- Occupations: Actress, singer, dancer
- Years active: 1959–present
- Spouse: Lance Rentzel (m. 1969; div. 1972)
- Father: Ray Heatherton

Davenie Johanna "Joey" Heatherton (born September 14, 1944) is an American actress, dancer, and singer. A sex symbol of the 1960s and 1970s, she is best known for her many television appearances during that time. Heatherton was a frequent variety show performer but also had a number of acting roles. She performed in front of U.S. troops for over a decade on USO tours presented by Bob Hope. Heatherton starred in several feature films, including My Blood Runs Cold (1965) and The Happy Hooker Goes to Washington (1977).

== Early life ==
Davenie Johanna Heatherton was born in New York City and raised in Rockville Centre, New York, a town of Nassau County close to New York City. She was nicknamed "Joey" as a child, a combination of her first name Davenie and her middle name Johanna. Her father, Ray Heatherton, was a Broadway star (Babes in Arms) and television pioneer. He was famous in the greater New York area as the star of the long-running children's television show The Merry Mailman. Her mother, also named Davenie, was a dancer who met Ray Heatherton when both were performing in Babes in Arms. Heatherton has a brother, Dick (born October 19, 1943), who later became a disc jockey.

Heatherton attended Saint Agnes Academy, a Catholic grade and high school. At the age of six, she began studying ballet at the Dixon McAfee School of Dance and went on to four years of study under George Balanchine, and then went on to study modern jazz dance, voice, and dramatics.

== Career ==
=== Early career ===
Heatherton began her career as a child actress. She first appeared on television on her father's show The Merry Mailman, a popular children's show in New York. In 1959, at age 15, Heatherton became a member of the ensemble and an understudy in the original Broadway production of The Sound of Music, and received her first sustained national exposure that same year as a semi-regular on The Perry Como Show (later called Perry Como's Kraft Music Hall), playing an exuberant teenager with a perpetual crush on Perry Como. Heatherton also released her first single that year, titled "That's How It Goes"/"I'll Be Seeing You", but failed to have a hit with it or with the three additional singles she released over the next few years.

Heatherton returned to Broadway in 1960, co-starring in the short-lived There Was a Little Girl opposite Jane Fonda. Heatherton's first television role as a dramatic actress came that same year when she guest-starred as a wealthy, spoiled teen on an early episode of Route 66. During the early 1960s, Heatherton was frequently cast as a troubled teenager owing to her "sexy-kid look".

=== 1960s ===
Beginning in the mid-1960s, Heatherton began to gain attention for her sensual dancing on television, which some viewers considered shocking and some critics derided as "sleazy eroticism". In 1964, Heatherton appeared on The Tonight Show, where she coached Johnny Carson on the finer points of dancing "The Frug". Heatherton received major publicity following her guest appearance on the January 1965 premiere episode of the teen dance show Hullabaloo. Heatherton was featured on several more episodes of the show and released "Hullabaloo", a song that she had performed on the show, on Coral Records. At the invitation of Dean Martin, Heatherton also appeared extensively on The Dean Martin Show starting with the premiere episode of September 16, 1965. She was a mystery guest on the game show What's My Line? on November 7, 1965, the last live telecast on which Dorothy Kilgallen appeared.

From June to September 1968, along with Frank Sinatra, Jr., Heatherton co-hosted Martin's summer-substitute musical comedy hour Dean Martin Presents the Golddiggers. She also made multiple appearances on other 1960s television variety shows, such as The Andy Williams Show, The Hollywood Palace, The Ed Sullivan Show, and This Is Tom Jones.

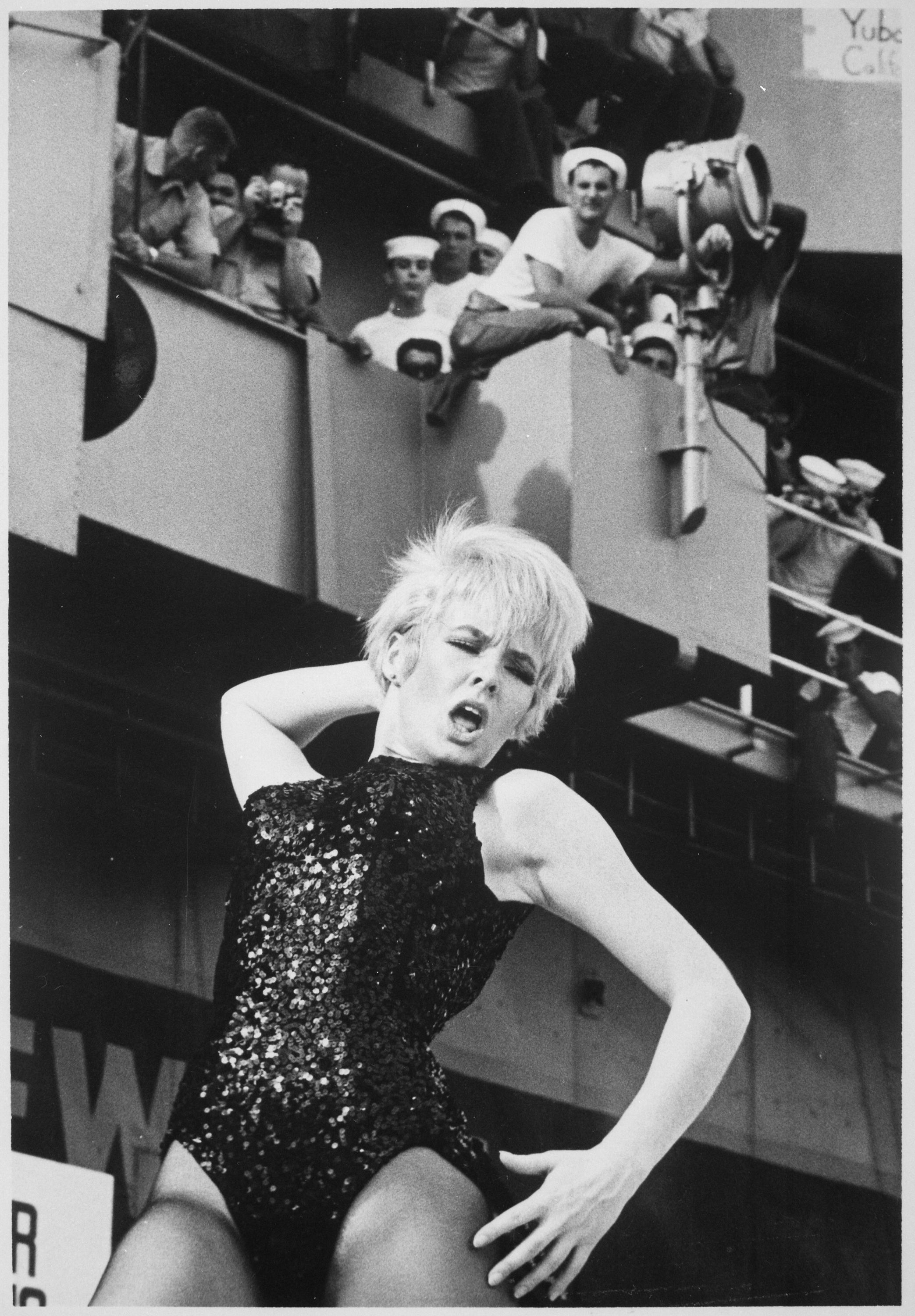
Heatherton dancing on the USS Ticonderoga, December 27, 1965

From 1965 to 1977, Heatherton performed live with Bob Hope's touring USO troupe, entertaining the GIs with her singing, dancing, and provocative outfits. Excerpts from the USO tours were televised as part of Hope's long-running series of NBC monthly specials, culminating in the top-rated Christmas shows, where Heatherton's segments were regularly featured.

Throughout the 1960s, Heatherton interspersed her variety show appearances with dramatic turns on episodic television series, including Mr. Novak, The Virginian, The Nurses, I Spy, and It Takes a Thief.

Heatherton also appeared in the movies Twilight of Honor (1963), Where Love Has Gone (1964), and My Blood Runs Cold (1965). In her film debut, Twilight of Honor, she played the young wife of an accused murderer (Oscar-nominee Nick Adams). The only one of the three films to be made in color, 1964's Where Love Has Gone, was a big-budget melodrama based on Harold Robbins' roman à clef about the scandalous Lana Turner-Cheryl Crane-Johnny Stompanato manslaughter case, with Heatherton playing the daughter of the Turner character (Susan Hayward). The William Conrad thriller My Blood Runs Cold marked Heatherton's first leading role in a film, opposite Troy Donahue.

=== 1970s–present ===
By the 1970s, Heatherton's career was slowing down, but she was still popular enough to do a series of television ads for RC Cola and Serta mattresses. Heatherton performed in Las Vegas and acted in a few television shows and films, including the 1972 thriller Bluebeard (with Richard Burton in the title role), wherein she did her only onscreen nude scene. In 1972, Heatherton also released her first album, The Joey Heatherton Album. The first single, a cover of the 1957 Ferlin Husky song "Gone", spent 15 weeks on Billboard's Hot 100, peaking at #24. "Gone" also peaked at #38 in Australia. The second single, "I'm Sorry", peaked at #87. The album was re-released in 2004 with a nude photo of Joey on the cover taken by photographer Harry Langdon Jr. She posed for the topless image while filming Bluebeard.

A brief high point came in July 1975 when Heatherton headlined Joey & Dad, a four-week Sunday night summer replacement series for Cher's 1975–76 variety show in which she performed alongside her father. Each episode involved Ray Heatherton waxing nostalgic over life with his daughter while rooting through his attic.

In 1977, Heatherton played the starring role as Xaviera Hollander in the Watergate-inspired The Happy Hooker Goes to Washington. In 1990, she returned to the screen with a small role as a religious fanatic in John Waters' teen musical comedy film Cry-Baby. In 1997, Heatherton appeared nude in an issue of Playboy.

== Personal life ==
In April 1969, Heatherton married Lance Rentzel, a Dallas Cowboys wide receiver, in New York City. In November 1970, Rentzel was arrested for exposing himself to a 10-year-old girl. He pleaded guilty, promised to undergo psychiatric treatment, and was given a suspended sentence. Heatherton filed for divorce in September 1971 and her career lost its luster; some say Heatherton never recovered from the psychological shock of Rentzel’s offense. The divorce became final in 1972.

On July 8, 1985, Heatherton was arrested and charged with interfering with a government agent's duties and disturbing the peace after she allegedly slapped and pulled the hair of a clerk at Manhattan's U.S. Passport Agency office. Heatherton was acquitted of both charges in September 1986.

Also in July 1986, Heatherton was arrested and charged with theft of services for refusing to pay a $4,906 bill from a hotel and spa in Long Island where she stayed in 1984. She pled not guilty.

On August 30, 1986, Heatherton was arrested for assault in Hillcrest, Rockland County, New York, after she stabbed Jerry Fischer, her former boyfriend and ex-manager, in the hand with a steak knife during an argument. Fischer was later treated at a local hospital and released. After her arrest, Heatherton told police who she was, but they did not believe her. Heatherton then handed one of the officers her purse to verify her identity. While looking through it, the officer found a foil packet with less than a gram of cocaine. Heatherton was charged with assault and misdemeanor drug possession. In October 1987, a court ruled that the search was unconstitutional as Heatherton was not advised that she could refuse a purse search. As a result, the misdemeanor drug possession was dropped. Jerry Fischer later dropped the charge of assault against Heatherton.

== TV and filmography ==
Year	Title	Role	Notes
1960	Route 66	Karen Emerson	Episode: "Three Sides"
1962 to 1963	The Doctors and the Nurses	Janet Clark; Ellen Denby	2 episodes
1963	The Virginian	Gloria Blaine	1 episode
1963	Twilight of Honor	Laura Mae Brown	Feature film (Alternative title: The Charge is Murder)
1963	Mr. Novak	Holly Metcalfe	Episode: "To Break a Camel's Back"
1963	Arrest and Trial	Edith	Episode: "Some Weeks Are All Mondays"
1964	Bob Hope Presents the Chrysler Theatre	Cress	Episode: "Runaway"
1964	Channing		Episode: "The Trouble with Girls"
1964	Breaking Point	Dory Costain	Episode: "I, the Dancer"
1964	Where Love Has Gone	Danielle Valerie Miller	Feature film
1965	What's My Line?	Herself	
1965	My Blood Runs Cold	Julie Merriday	Feature film
1966	I Spy	Katie	2 episodes
1968	Of Mice and Men	Curley's Wife	Television movie
1969	It Takes a Thief	Dodie DuBois	2 episodes "A Matter of Grey Matter"
1969	The Jackie Gleason Show	Emily Gogolak	Episode: "The Honeymooners: Happiness Is a Rich Uncle"
1969	The Ballad of Andy Crocker	Lisa	Television movie
1970	Love, American Style	Tippy	Segment: "Love and the Hitchhiker"
1970	The Hollywood Palace	Herself	Episode: Don Knotts hosting
1971	The Powder Room		Television movie
1972	Bluebeard	Anne	Feature film
1973	Old Faithful	Herself	Television movie
1975	Joey and Dad	Herself	4 episodes - Co-star with father Ray
1976	Doug Henning's World of Magic 2	Herself	Television special
1977	The Happy Hooker Goes to Washington	Xaviera Hollander	Feature film
1981	Laverne & Shirley	Herself	Episode: "Night at the Awards"
1986	The Perils of P.K.		Feature film
1990	Cry-Baby	Mrs. Hackett	Feature film
2002	Reflections of Evil	Serta Spokeswoman (archival footage)	Feature film

== Award nominations ==
Year	Award	Category	Title of work
1964	Golden Laurel Award	Top Female New Face	–
1964	Golden Globe Awards	Most Promising Newcomer - Female	Twilight of Honor
1966	Golden Laurel Award	New Faces, Female	–
