= Tippy Stringer =

American television personality (1930–2010)

Lewis Tipton Stringer (July 15, 1930 - October 1, 2010) was an American television personality.

== Early years ==
Lewis Tipton Stringer was born on July 15, 1930, in Evanston, Illinois, the daughter of Mr. and Mrs. Arthur Stringer. Her first and middle names came from her mother's family. Her father was a National Association of Broadcasters official. She moved with her family to the Washington, D. C. area before 1940, and she was a graduate of Bethesda-Chevy Chase High School.

== College ==
Stringer's first name resulted in a gender misunderstanding when she was accepted at the College of William & Mary and was assigned to a men's dormitory. By the time college authorities realized the errot, no space remained in women's housing. She decided to attend the University of Maryland (UM), and she began going by "Tippy". She majored in speech and drama at UM and was a member of Delta Delta Delta sorority. She was the university's homecoming queen in her junior year. She acted with the University Theater, having the leading role in Room Service. Other productions in which she participated included Caesar and Cleopatra and Macbeth. Besides acting, she painted scenery and worked as a stagehand for the theater's productions. Her artistic efforts also gained recognition while she was at UM. She drew a charcoal sketch that won first prize in a competition; an oil portrait that she painted took second place, and one of her works was chosen as the "painting of the month".

In 1951 she won $250 in auditions for the radio program Philip Morris Playhouse in competition with 15 other college students. She also received an all-expenses-paid weekend in New York City, and she appeared on the program. She had the ingenue lead in Faith of Our Fathers, a historical drama that was seen by more than 100,000 people in the Carter Barron Amphitheatre in Washington, D. C., that summer. In the fall of 1951 she represented the state of Maryland as a princess in the annual Shenandoah Apple Blossom Festival in Winchester, Virginia. In December 1951 she was one of 30 UM students named in the 1951-1952 edition of Who's Who in American Colleges and Universities.

Stringer's off-campus activities during her college years included being a model for fashion shows, appearing on a weekly television program, and making TV commercials.

== Career ==
Stringer was a singer and a member of the ad-lib cast on the Allan Jefferys Show on a Washington, D. C. television station. She worked at WRC-TV in Washington, initially as hostess of programs about cooking and homemaking. In 1953 she became a "weather girl" on that station. She had no experience reading weather maps when she took the TV job. A representative of Drug Fair, which sponsored Tippy Stringer and the Weather, said, "I don't know what there was about her; she was fresh-looking, mildly pretty but a marvelous spokeswoman. She had that 'familyish' quality, a particular realness that appealed to her audience."

While Stringer did weather segments on TV she had an engagement at the Blue Room nightclub in the Shoreham Hotel in Washington. Between her 6:45 and 11:10 evening broadcasts ("wearing pearls and a perfect coiffure"), she went to the hotel, changed clothes, and sang in two floor shows each evening.

The College Board of Hecht's department store chain named her the College-Career Girl of 1955, and she appeared in newspaper advertisements for the Lansburgh's department store chain.

Stringer was part of Operation Santa Claus, headed by Edgar Bergen, in 1952, and one summer she was a member of a group of entertainers who toured the Azores, Africa, and Bermuda entertaining troops. In 1956 she returned to the Shenandoah Apple Blossom Festival, this time as marshal of the Fireman's Parade component of the festival.

Stringer's marriage in 1959 led to her retirement from television.

== Other activities ==
Stringer ran for Congress as a Republican from Montana in 1978. In 1995 she created the Stringer Foundation. Causes that it supports include reproductive education and public broadcasting.

== Personal life and death ==
Stringer married TV newsman Chet Huntley on March 7, 1959, in Lake Bluff, Illinois. They had been introduced to each other by David Brinkley, Huntley's on-air partner who was based in Washington. Their marriage lasted until his death in 1974. After they retired in 1970 they moved to his home state, Montana. There they created the Big Sky Resort outside of Bozeman. In 1980 actor William Conrad visted the resort and met Stringer. They married that year, and she moved to Los Angeles, helping to manage his career. Their marriage ended with his death in 1994. She died on October 1, 2010, at her Los Angeles home, aged 80.
