= Wild, Wild World of Animals =

American television series

- Narrated by: William Conrad
- Composers: Gerhard Trede; Beatrice Witkin; Richard Peaslee
- Countries of origin: United States (based on source material from other producers)
- No. of seasons: 5

Production
- Executive producers: Jonathan Donald; Lothar Wolff
- Producer: Hugh Falkus
- Editor: Mark Cerutti
- Production company: Time-Life Television

Original release
- Network: syndicated
- Release: 1973 – 1978

Wild, Wild World of Animals is a syndicated American television show that features wildlife and nature documentaries. It was originally produced from 1973 until 1978, and was narrated by William Conrad. The soundtrack was composed by Gerhard Trede, Beatrice Witkin, and Richard Peaslee. Produced by Time-Life Television, the series features documentaries produced by various production companies worldwide, including the BBC. Reruns were later aired by Superstation WTBS, PBS, the USA Network, and Australia's ABC during the 1980s.

A series of hardbound books published by Time-Life was also published during this period to accompany the series.

HBO owns the series today; while the series has been made available on home videotape worldwide, the series has not seen release on DVD or Blu-ray formats. HBO currently offers clips of the series to commercial customers.
