= Beatrice Witkin =

American composer and pianist (1916–1990)

Beatrice Braverman Witkin (May 13, 1916 – February 7, 1990) was an American composer and pianist who was best known for her electronic music, especially the theme she composed for the TV show Wild, Wild World of Animals in 1973.

== Career ==
Witkin studied piano with Eduard Steuermann and composition with Roger Sessions, Mark Brunswick and Stefan Wolpe. She received a B.A. from Hunter College and a master's degree from New York University. She married Louis Witkin in 1938 and they had one daughter (Judy) and one son (Steve).

Witkin received grants from the Rockefeller Foundation, the Ford Foundation, the National Endowment for the Arts, and the Hebrew Arts Music School. She released two LPs of chamber music, and received the Creative Arts Public Service Grant and the American Society of Composers, Authors, and Publishers (ASCAP) Standard Award.

In 1963, Witkin helped establish the Contemporary Chamber Ensemble, a performing group that commissioned new works. She was a guest composer at the MacDowell Colony in New Hampshire as well as a longtime member of the Women's Composers Forum and ASCAP. In 1968, she was invited to work at the Electronic Music Studio at the New York University School of the Arts. Two years later, her electronic composition Glissines was a winner in High Fidelity magazine's Electronic Music Contest.

Witkin's papers are archived at Wesleyan University in Middletown, Connecticut.

Her compositions include:

== Concert band ==
- Stephen Foster Revisited (1980)

== Chamber ==
- Cantillations I (two clarinets and piano; 1982)
- Cantillations II (two clarinets; 1983)
- Cantillations III (two violins)
- Cantillations of the Bible (string quartet; 1985)
- Chiaroscuro (cello and piano; 1968)
- Combinations for 13 Instruments (1965)
- Contour (piano; 1964)
- Duo (violin and piano; 1960–61)
- Interludes for Flute (1960)
- Nocturne for Solo Cello
- Parameters for Eight Instruments (1964)
- Serenade
- Sonata, Opus 2
- Treble Trio
- Triads and Things (brass quintet)
- Work for Two B-flat Clarinets (1981)

== Electronic ==
- Beethoven Piano Sonata
- Breath and Sounds (tuba and tape; 1972)
- Echologie (flute and tape; 1972)
- Electronic (1971)
- Electronic Mother Goose
- Glissines
- Homage to Handel
- Oboe Trio
- Pendulum
- Reports from the Planet Mars (orchestra and tape)
- Time Machine (1971)
- Wild, Wild World of Animals (for television; 1973)

== Orchestra ==
- Fanfare in B and E-flat (1968)
- Stephen Foster Variations for Orchestra
- Swingeroo (1938)
- Twelve Tone Variations Derived from the Beatles

== Theatre ==
- Crisis: A Play (script by Gloria Goldsmith; music by Beatrice Witkin)
- Does Poppy Live Here? (based on the book by Arthur Gregor; music by Beatrice Witkin; 1957)
- Iliad of Indian Creek (1979)

== Vocal ==
- Emerson Songs (1987–88)
- Kitchen Music Songs (1949–50)
- Prose Poem (words by J. F. Farrell; music by Beatrice Within; soprano, narrator, cello, horn and percussion; 1963–64)
- Ya Wanna Be Friends? (words by Belle Goldstine; music by Beatrice Witkin)
