= Catastrophe (film) =

1977 American documentary film

- Theatrical release poster
- Directed by: Larry Savadove
- Written by: Larry Savadove
- Produced by: Larry Savadove
- Narrated by: William Conrad
- Edited by: Thea Bentier
- Music by: Ray Ellis
- Production company: Joaquin Associates
- Distributed by: New World Pictures
- Release date: April 20, 1977
- Running time: 90 minutes
- Country: United States
- Language: English

Catastrophe is a 1977 American documentary film that is written and directed by Larry Savadove and narrated by actor William Conrad about natural and man-made disasters.

== Disasters featured ==
- The footage of the Hindenburg disaster in 1937.
- The tornado that hit Xenia, Ohio in 1974
- Hurricane Camille in 1969.
- The Dust Bowl during the Great Depression
- The 1974 Joelma fire in Brazil.
- The eruption of Mount Etna in Italy in 1971.
- The sinking of the SS Andrea Doria in 1956.
- The accidents during the 1973 Indianapolis 500.

== Release ==
=== Theatrical ===
Catastrophe premiered in Tucson, Arizona on April 20, 1977, and later received a wide release in the United States in February 1978.

=== Home media ===
In 1987, Embassy Home Entertainment (later renamed as Nelson Entertainment) released the film on VHS.

=== Television broadcasts ===
The film premiered on premium cable network Home Box Office (HBO) in March 1979.

The film aired on the superstation feed of Chicago independent station WGN-TV in 1992.
