= The Joey Heatherton Album =

Studio album by Joey Heatherton
- Released: September 1972
- Genre: Pop
- Length: 28:34
- Label: MGM
- Producer: Tony Scotti; Tommy Oliver

Singles from The Joey Heatherton Album
- 1. "Gone" / "The Road I Took To You (Pieces)" Released: 1972; 2. "I'm Sorry" / "Someone to Watch Over Me" Released: 1972; 3. "Crazy" / "God Only Knows" Released: 1973

The Joey Heatherton Album is a studio album by American actress, dancer and singer Joey Heatherton, released in September 1972 by MGM Records. Produced and arranged by Tony Scotti and Tommy Oliver, the album peaked at No. 154 on the Billboard 200 album chart. It received favorable reception among music publications and writers, focusing on Heatherton's singing and the song selections that were considered "oldies" and "of nostalgia". The album was reissued in 2004 by Hip-O Select, including bonus tracks of her 1960s recordings.

== Background ==
Having started her entertainment career in Broadway theatre at a young age, Joey Heatherton was a rising actress and dancer who first gained publicity for her sensual, energetic dancing style on television, and later her tours for the USO in the 1960s. Wanting to expand her mainstream image and leverage her acting skills, she appeared in several drama films such as My Blood Runs Cold and acted in television dramas. Between 1964 and 1966, Heatherton was signed to Coral and Decca Records and recorded songs in New York City with arranger Dick Jacobs, some of which were released as singles. Neither of the singles charted, but some songs from her 1960s singles would later be included in the 2004 reissue of the Joey Heatherton Album as bonus tracks. In 1971, Record World and Billboard reported that Joey Heatherton discussed plans for an album and recorded four songs for "an independent label".

== Release ==
The Joey Heatherton Album was released in September 1972 by MGM Records. Joey Heatherton supported the album with live performances in major cities such as Las Vegas, and New York City, where she made headlines in performing at the Waldorf Astoria's nightclub, the Empire Room, which received generous and positive reception. Record World described Heatherton's voice as "versatile" while singing "old fashioned love songs" in her performance at the Empire Room. Similarly, Billboard praised Heatherton for her vocal "range and power, matched by accuracy and command" and her "high voltage energy" and "dancing routines".

MGM Records heavily promoted the album, which included Heatherton visiting radio stations and music publications, and having a front-cover advertisement on Billboard. Several accompanying singles were issued to promote the album, including "Gone" and "I'm Sorry" in 1972, and later "Crazy" in 1973. Despite this, the singles "Gone" and "I'm Sorry" peaked at Nos. 24 and 87, respectively, on the Billboard Hot 100 singles chart, while The Joey Heatherton Album peaked at No. 154 on the Billboard 200 albums chart.

== Critical reception ==
Professional ratings
Review scores
Source	Rating
AllMusic	4/5 stars

The Joey Heatherton Album received mostly positive reception. Billboard noted Joey Heatherton's commercial success on the singles chart and expected the similar success of the album, while lauding producers Tony Scotti and Tommy Oliver for providing the "strong materials" that suited Heatherton's singing. Cashbox described The Joey Heatherton Album as an album that has "strong oldies that fit her perfectly", such as "Crazy", "Right or Wrong". "The Road I Took to You (Pieces)", remarking that "beauty is as beauty does". In a separate review for Heatherton's single, "Gone", Cashbox asserts that Heatherton was "already breaking on the incoming tide of nostalgia as well as its own merits".

The album was reissued in 2004 by Hip-O Select and Universal Records, including eleven bonus tracks, which contains Heatherton's 1960s recordings for Decca Records and Coral Records. The Hip-O Select reissue was a limited edition compact disc that was only available through Hip-O Select's website. Writing for AllMusic, Lindsay Planer held a favorable attitude toward the album, naming Heatherton's interpretation of "God Only Knows", "Crazy", and "Someone to Watch Over Me" as "impressive" and "irresistable".

== Track listing ==
Side one
No.	Title	Writer(s)	Length
1.	"Crazy"	Willie Nelson	3:02
2.	"God Only Knows"	Brian Wilson, Tony Asher	2:30
3.	"Shake-A-Hand"	Carol Carmichael	2:39
4.	"It's Not Easy"	Barry Mann, Cynthia Weil	2:58
5.	"Right or Wrong"	Wanda Jackson	2:55
Total length:			14:04

Side two
No.	Title	Writer(s)	Length
6.	"I'm Sorry"	Dub Allbritten, Ronnie Self	2:40
7.	"Gone"	Smokey Rogers	3:12
8.	"Say Hello"	Paul Williams	2:43
9.	"The Road I Took To You (Pieces)"	Barbara Keith	2:51
10.	"Someone to Watch Over Me"	George Gershwin, Ira Gershwin	3:04
Total length:			14:30 (28:34)

2004 Hip-O reissue bonus tracks
No.	Title	Writer(s)	Length
11.	"That's How It Goes"	Tony Hatch	2:29
12.	"I'll Be Seeing You"	Sammy Fain, Irving Kahal	2:09
13.	"The Hullabaloo"	Carl Davis, Major Lance, William Butler	2:31
14.	"My Blood Runs Cold"	Herbert Martin, Michael Leonard	2:44
15.	"Tomorrow Is Another Day"	Lenore Rosenblatt, Vic Millrose	2:31
16.	"But He's Not Mine"	Dick Heatherton	2:35
17.	"Live and Learn"	David Tricker, John Madara	2:08
18.	"When You Call Me Baby"	Tricker, Madara, Len Barry, Leon Huff	2:19
19.	"You're the One for Me"	unknown	2:09
20.	"Till There Was You"	Meredith Willson	2:16
21.	"Growing Up Is Learning to Say Goodbye"	Martin, Leonard	3:18
Total length:			27:09 (55:43)

== Personnel ==
Personnel per MGM Records.

- Joey Heatherton – vocals
- Tommy Oliver, Tony Scotti – producer, arranger
- Michael Lloyd – recording engineer
- Harry Langdon, Jr. – photography

== Charts ==
Chart (1972–1973)	Peak position
US Top LPs & Tape (Billboard)	154
US Top 100 Albums (Cashbox)	149
