= Nick Adams (actor, born 1931) =

American actor, screenwriter (1931–1968)

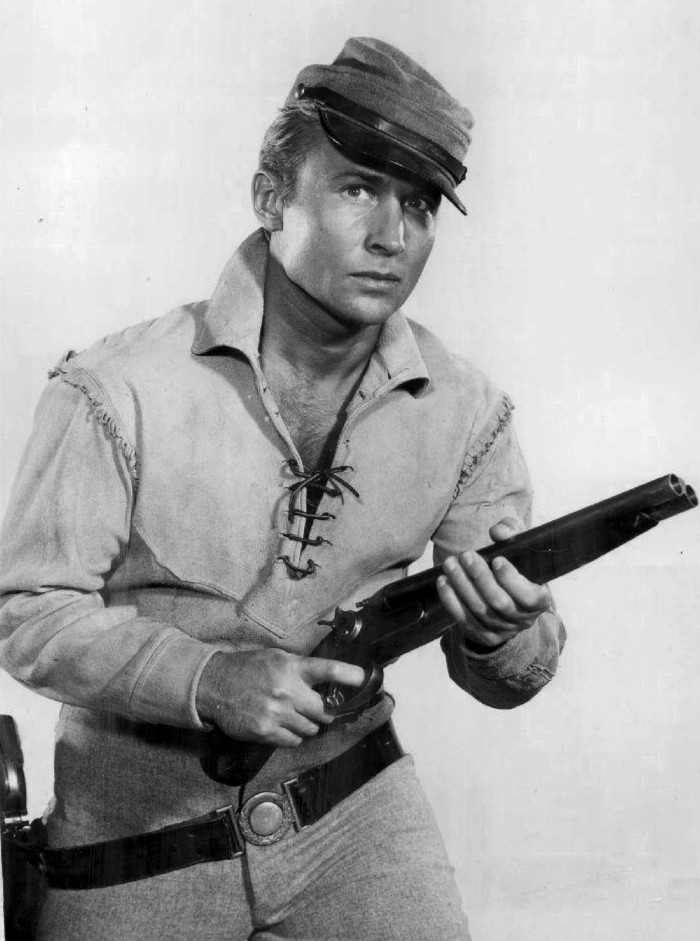
- Adams promo for The Rebel (1959)
- Born: Nicholas Aloysius Adamshock; July 10, 1931; Nanticoke, Pennsylvania, U.S.
- Died: February 7, 1968 (aged 36); Beverly Hills, California, U.S.
- Cause of death: Drug overdose
- Occupations: Actor; screenwriter
- Years active: 1948–1968
- Spouse: Carol Nugent (m. 1959)
- Children: 2

Nicholas Aloysius Adamshock (Note: Ukrainian: Ніколас Алоізіус Адемшок, romanized: Nikolas Aloizius Ademshok) (July 10, 1931 – February 7, 1968), better known as Nick Adams, was an American film and television actor and screenwriter. He was noted for his roles in several Hollywood films during the 1950s and 1960s, including Rebel Without a Cause along with his starring role in the ABC television series The Rebel (1959–1961). He was nominated for the Academy Award for Best Supporting Actor for his performance in Twilight of Honor (1963). He also led the cast of several Japanese productions, including Frankenstein Conquers the World, Invasion of Astro-Monster and The Killing Bottle.

Decades after his death from a prescription drug overdose at the age of 36, Adams' widely publicized friendships with James Dean and Elvis Presley would stir speculation about both his private life and the circumstances of his death. In an AllMovie synopsis for Adams' last film Fever Heat, reviewer Dan Pavlides wrote, "Plagued by personal excesses, he will be remembered just as much for what he could have done in cinema as what he left behind."

== Early life and career ==
Nick Adams was born as Nicholas Aloysius Adamshock in Nanticoke, Pennsylvania, to Catherine (Kutz) and Peter Adamshock, an anthracite coal miner; both his parents were of Ukrainian ancestry. In 1958, he told columnist Hedda Hopper, "We lived in those little company houses—they were terrible. We had to buy from the company store and were always in debt and could never leave." After a mining accident, Adamshock's father quit his job as a miner and the family moved to Jersey City.

Although a successful athlete at Henry Snyder High School, Adamschock failed to get a part in the school play when he was a senior. Adamshock's friends teased him about his acting ambitions. "Everybody thought I was crazy," he recalled. "My father said, 'Nick, get a trade, be a barber or something.' I said, 'But, Pop, I want to do something where I can make lots of money. You can't make lots of money with just a trade.'" After a year of unpaid acting in New York, he hitchhiked to Los Angeles.

== Hollywood career ==
=== Struggling actor ===
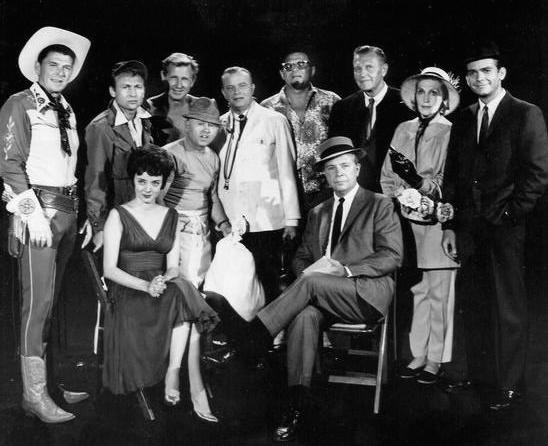
Guest stars for the 1961 premiere episode of The Dick Powell Show, "Who Killed Julie Greer?". Standing, from left: Ronald Reagan, Nick Adams, Lloyd Bridges, Mickey Rooney, Edgar Bergen, Jack Carson, Ralph Bellamy, Kay Thompson, Dean Jones. Seated, from left, Carolyn Jones and Dick Powell.

Adamshock's earliest reported paid acting job in Los Angeles under the name Nick Adams was a stage role at the Las Palmas Theater in a comedy called Mr. Big Shot. Although he was paid about $60 a week, Adams had to pay $175 for membership in Actors' Equity Association. He also earned $25 one night at the Mocambo nightclub, filling in for Pearl Bailey who had fallen ill. Eight years later, Hedda Hopper told Adams she recalled writing about him at the time; and he replied by reciting back to her, "Nick Adams, gas station attendant from New Jersey, did an impersonation of Jimmy Cagney and a scene from Glass Menagerie."

After three years of struggle and optimistic self-promotion, his first film role came in 1951, an uncredited one-liner as a Western Union delivery boy in George Seaton's Somebody Loves Me (1952). This allowed him to join the Screen Actors Guild, but he was unable to find steady acting work, even when "creatively" claiming he had appeared with Jack Palance in The Silver Tassie in New York. Undaunted, Adams joined a theater workshop run by Arthur Kennedy. In January 1952, Adams enlisted in the U.S. Coast Guard during the Korean War, serving as an Electrician's Mate. He served until 1955, attaining the rank of Petty Officer Second Class and was awarded the National Defense and Korean War Service Medals.

=== Supporting actor ===
About two years later, in June 1954, Adams' ship docked in Long Beach Harbor and, after a brash audition for director John Ford during which Adams did impressions of James Cagney and other celebrities while dressed in his Coast Guard uniform, he took his accumulated leave and appeared as Seaman Reber in the 1955 film version of Mister Roberts. Adams then completed his military service, returned to Los Angeles and, at the age of 23, based on his work in Mister Roberts, secured a powerful agent and signed with Warner Bros.

Adams had a small role as Chick in Rebel Without a Cause (1955). Also that year Adams played the role of Bomber the paper boy in the widely popular film adaptation of Picnic (1955), which was mostly filmed on location in Kansas, and starred William Holden, Kim Novak and Susan Strasberg. He was not perceived by casting directors as tall or handsome enough for leading roles but during the late 1950s, Adams had supporting roles in several successful television productions, including one episode of Wanted Dead or Alive (1958) starring Steve McQueen, and films such as Our Miss Brooks (1956), No Time for Sergeants (1958), Teacher's Pet (1958) and Pillow Talk (1959).

=== James Dean ===
Adams initially may have met James Dean in December 1950 while jitterbugging for a soft drink commercial filmed at Griffith Park. (Note: This commercial is widely and reliably cited as James Dean's first paid work as an actor, but Adams's participation is only ambiguously confirmed. Many Internet accounts describe it as a Pepsi-Cola commercial, but it may have been for Coca-Cola. A few accounts say Adams was called back (with Dean and another actress) for a second day of interior shots around a jukebox.) Adams spent three years in the Coast Guard between the time this commercial was shot in late 1950 and the start of filming for Rebel Without a Cause in March 1955. Actor Jack Grinnage, who played Moose, recalled, "Off the set, Nick, Dennis (Hopper), and the others would go out together—almost like the gang we portrayed—but Jimmy and Corey Allen ... were not a part of that." When production was wrapped, Dean said in another press release, "I now regard Natalie (Wood), Nick, and Sal (Mineo) as co-workers; I regard them as friends ... about the only friends I have in this town. And I hope we all work together again soon." Following Dean's 1955 death in an automobile accident, Adams overdubbed some of Dean's lines for the film Giant during Jett Rink's speech at the hotel and dated co-star Natalie Wood. Adams tried to capitalize on Dean's fame through various publicity stunts, including a claim he was being stalked by a crazed female Dean fan, allowing himself to be photographed at Dean's grave in a contemplative pose, holding flowers and surrounded by mourning, teenaged female fans along with writing articles and doing interviews about Dean for fan magazines. He also claimed to have developed Dean's affection for fast cars, later telling a reporter, "I became a highway delinquent. I was arrested nine times in one year. They put me on probation, but I kept on racing ... nowhere."

=== Elvis Presley ===
Adams's widely publicized friendship with Elvis Presley began in 1956 on the set of Presley's film Love Me Tender during the second day of shooting. Presley had admired James Dean, and when the singer arrived in Hollywood, he was encouraged by studio executives to be seen with some of the "hip" new young actors there. Meanwhile, his manager Colonel Tom Parker was worried that Elvis' new Hollywood acquaintances might influence Presley and even tell him what they were paying their managers and agents (a fraction of what Presley was paying Parker). Elaine Dundy called Parker a "master manipulator" who used Adams and others in the entourage (including Parker's own brother-in-law Bitsy Mott) to counter possible subversion against him and control Presley's movements. She later wrote a scathing characterization of Adams:

... Brash struggling young actor whose main scheme to further his career was to hitch his wagon to a star, the first being James Dean, about whose friendship he was noisily boastful ... this made it easy for Parker to suggest that Nick be invited to join Elvis' growing entourage of paid companions, and for Nick to accept ... following Adams' hiring, there appeared a newspaper item stating that Nick and Parker were writing a book on Elvis together.

Dundy also wrote, "Of all Elvis' new friends, Nick Adams, by background and temperament the most insecure, was also his closest." Adams was Dennis Hopper's roommate during this period, and the three reportedly socialized together, with Presley "hanging out more and more with Nick and his friends" and glad Parker "liked Nick". Decades later, Kathleen Tracy recalled Adams often met Presley backstage or at Graceland, where Presley often asked Adams "to stay over on nights": "He and Elvis would go motorcycle riding late at night and stay up until all hours talking about the pain of celebrity" and enjoying prescription drugs.

Almost 40 years later, writer Peter Guralnick wrote that Presley found it "good running around with Nick ... there was always something happening, and the hotel suite was like a private clubhouse where you needed to know the secret password to get in and he got to change the password every day." Presley's girlfriend June Juanico complained the singer was always talking about his friend Adams and James Dean. She also was upset that Adams had started inviting himself to see Presley and Juanico felt that she was trying to compete for Presley's attention. Adams would talk often about Natalie Wood to Presley, constantly discussing her figure and her beauty, something else that caused Juanico to feel that she would soon lose Presley to the glitz of Hollywood. Presley's own mother Gladys even commented about Adams, "He sure is a pushy little fellow".

As with Dean, Adams capitalized on his association with Presley, publishing an account of their friendship in May 1957. In August 1958, after the death of Presley's mother Gladys, Parker wrote in a letter, "Nicky Adams [sic] came out to be with Elvis last Week which [sic] was so very kind of him to be there with his friend."

The Rebel and the King by Nick Adams is a first-person account written by Adams about his friendship with Presley. The manuscript was written in 1956 by Nick during Presley's eight days in Memphis when the singer returned home for his big Tupelo homecoming. The manuscript was discovered 45 years later by Adams' daughter Allyson and initially published in 2012.

=== The Rebel ===
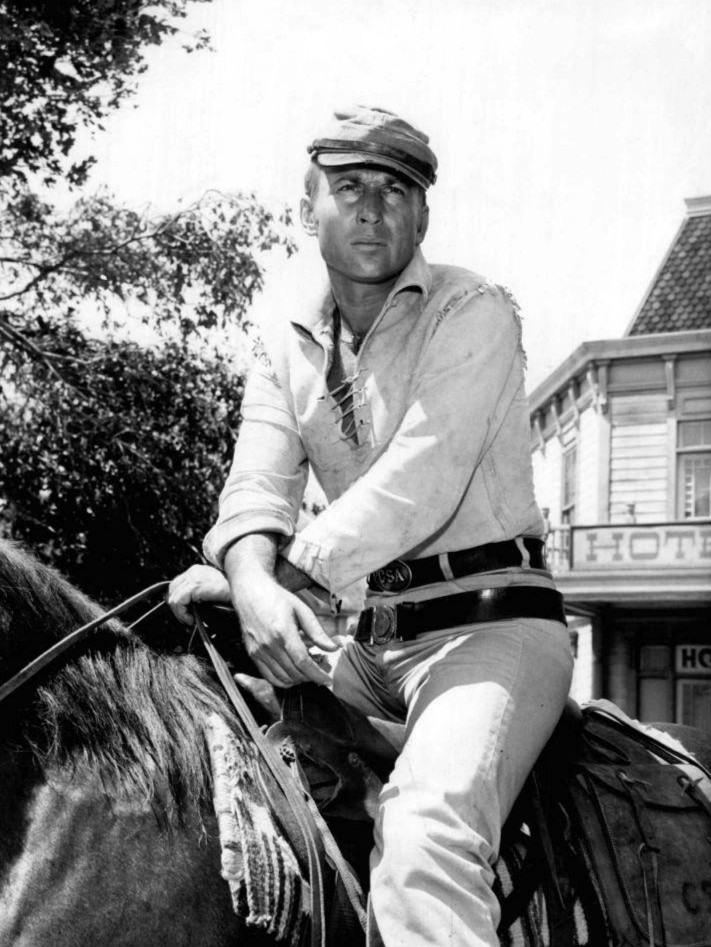
Nick Adams as Johnny Yuma

In 1959, Adams starred in the ABC series The Rebel playing the character Johnny Yuma, a wandering, ex-Confederate, journal-keeping, sawed-off shotgun toting "trouble-shooter" in the old American west. He is credited as a co-creator of The Rebel but he had no role in writing the pilot or any of the series' episodes. Adams had asked his friend Andrew J. Fenady to write the pilot as a starring vehicle for him. The series' only regular character, publicized as a "Reconstruction beatnik", was played by Adams. He reportedly consulted with John Wayne for tips on how to play the role. Adams wanted Presley to sing the theme song for The Rebel but the show's producer wanted Johnny Cash. Adams recorded the song "Tired and Lonely Rebel" in 1960. Guest stars appearing on the series during its two-year run included Dan Blocker, Johnny Cash, Leonard Nimoy, Tex Ritter and Robert Vaughn. A total of 76 half-hour episodes were filmed before the series was cancelled in 1961. Reruns were syndicated for several years. Adams went back to TV and film work, along with a role in the short-lived but critically successful television series Saints and Sinners.

=== Twilight of Honor ===
Adams was nominated for an Academy Award for Best Supporting Actor for his performance as unlikable murder suspect Ben Brown in the film Twilight of Honor (1963), which featured the film debuts of both Linda Evans and Joey Heatherton. He campaigned heavily for the award, spending over $8,000 on ads in trade magazines but many of his strongest scenes had been cut from the movie and he lost to Melvyn Douglas for Hud at the 36th Academy Awards.

=== Toho Studios and career decline ===
In 1964, Adams had a leading role opposite Nancy Malone in an episode ("Fun and Games") of The Outer Limits. A review of this episode written over three decades later would characterize him as an "underrated actor". By this time Adams' career was stalling. He had high hopes his co-starring performance with Robert Conrad in Young Dillinger (1964) would be critically acclaimed, but the project had low production values and both critics and audiences rejected the film. Also that year, Adams guest-starred in an episode of the short-lived CBS drama The Reporter. He also co-starred with Boris Karloff in Die, Monster, Die! (1965), a gothic horror–sci fi movie filmed in England.

In 1965, after publicly insisting he would never work in films produced outside the U.S., Adams began accepting parts in Japanese science fiction monster movies (kaiju eiga). He landed major roles in two science fiction epics from Toho Studios in Chiyoda, Tokyo. His first Japanese movie was Frankenstein vs. Baragon, in which he played Dr. James Bowen, a radiologist working in Hiroshima who encounters a new incarnation of the Frankenstein monster (Koji Furuhata). Adams next starred in the sixth Godzilla film, Invasion of Astro-Monster (known in the U.S. as Monster Zero), in which he played Astronaut Glenn, journeying to the newly discovered Planet X. In both films, his character had a love interest with characters portrayed by actress Kumi Mizuno. On the set of Invasion of Astro-Monster, Adams and co-star Yoshio Tsuchiya (who played the villainous Controller of Planet X) reportedly got along well and played jokes on each other. (Note: Adams once asked Tsuchiya how to say "good morning" in Japanese, but he instead taught Adams how to say "I'm hungry" (Adams was on a strict diet at the time and nearly fainted during filming). Later, when shooting a scene, Adams got even by saying to Tsuchiya in Japanese, "You're overacting!" Before leaving Toho, Adams wanted a picture of Tsuchiya, who at first thought he was just flattering him, but he said he really wanted something to remember him by. Before leaving Toho, Adams gave one of his formal outfits to Akira Kubo (who co-starred in Monster Zero as the meek inventor Tetsuo Torî) because, according to Kubo, "the suit fit me.") Adams made three films in Japan between 1965 and 1966. Adams' final film for Toho was The Killing Bottle, the fifth and final film in the International Secret Police series, which included Key of Keys, the basis for the Woody Allen scripted spoof What's Up, Tiger Lily? (1966). Toho shot the film in Japanese with Adams doing his lines in English as in the previous films. An English dub was commissioned by Henry G. Saperstein, and produced by Titra Studios. This English version was never released in the U.S., but there were rumors of the English dub being released in Yugoslavia. Adams performed his own fights scenes using Kenpō, a style he had been learning under senior grand master Ed Parker in the States.

=== 1967: TV episodes and low-budget films ===
Nick Adams wears an off-the-shelf motorcycle helmet in Mission Mars (1968), a photo taken shortly before his death.

In early 1967, Disney released Mosby's Marauders, a Civil War drama told from a southern perspective with Adams in the role of cruel Union army sergeant Gregg. Adams guest-starred in five episodes of four TV series that year, including an installment of his friend Robert Conrad's The Wild Wild West, an appearance in Combat! and two episodes of Hondo, a short-lived western which also had an ex-Confederate theme. Throughout 1967 and early 1968, he also worked in three low-budget films. One of these was Mission Mars (1968) which has been described as "rarely seen, and utterly dreadful." Adams' costume for this movie included an off-the-shelf motorcycle helmet. Reacting to Mission Mars over 30 years later, reviewer Gary Westfahl wrote, "The only quality that Adams could persuasively project on film was a desperate desire to be popular, to be liked ... which helps to explain why Adams got his foot in many doors." Adams's last U.S. production was a movie filmed in Iowa called Fever Heat. His last film appearance was in the little-seen Spanish-language western Los Asesinos, filmed in Mexico City, Mexico.

== Marriage and children ==
Nick Adams (with props from his TV series The Rebel) and Carol Nugent pose for a publicity photo taken shortly after their marriage.

Adams married former child actress Carol Nugent in 1959, three weeks after meeting her. Nugent had appeared in an episode of The Rebel. They had two children, Allyson Lee and Jeb Stuart. Jeb was a child actor, then gave up acting and is now a successful realtor in Ventura County, California. Allyson was a film director but is now a costume designer and activist.

Sometimes acrimonious marital problems reportedly interfered with Adams' ability to get lucrative acting parts after 1963. While promoting Young Dillinger during a television appearance on The Les Crane Show in early 1965, Adams "shocked" the viewing audience with an announcement that he was leaving Nugent, seemingly without telling her first. The couple publicly announced a reconciliation a week later, but his career and personal life following this episode have been characterized as a "tragic freefall".

Adams and actress Kumi Mizuno may have had a short affair while he was working in Japan. "That's one of the reasons my parents were divorced," his daughter, playwright Allyson Lee Adams, later said. "My dad had a penchant for becoming infatuated with his leading ladies. It was a way for him to take on the role he was playing at the time." Rumors of a romance between the two were common occurrence until Mizuno denied it during an interview in 1996.

By July 1965, Adams and Nugent were legally separated; Nugent filed for divorce in September. The following month, while Adams was in Japan, Nugent was granted a divorce and custody of the children. In January 1966, Adams and Nugent announced another reconciliation on Bill John's Hollywood Star Notebook, a local television show. However, in November 1966, Nugent resumed the divorce proceedings and obtained a restraining order against him, alleging Adams was "prone to fits of temper", and in an affidavit, charged he had "choked her, struck her and threatened to kill her during the past few weeks." On January 20, 1967, Adams was waiting for a court hearing to start when he was served with a $110,000 defamation suit by Nugent's boyfriend, Paul Rapp, who later married Nugent. Nevertheless, nine days later he was granted temporary custody of the children. His son Jeb Adams later recalled, "He saw it as a competition, basically, more than anything of getting custody of us. But, a matter of a week or two later, he gave us back to my mom." Nugent later regained legal custody of the children.

== Death ==
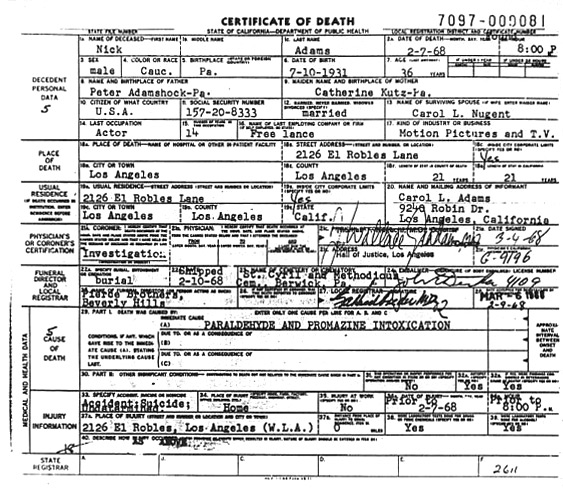
Adams' death certificate

After finishing Los Asesinos (1968), produced by Luis Enrique Vergara and filmed in Mexico, Adams bought a plane ticket with his own money and flew to Rome, Italy, to co-star with Aldo Ray in a science fiction/horror movie called Murder in the Third Dimension, but when he got there, he found the project had been dropped. Susan Strasberg, who had worked with him 13 years earlier on the hit film Picnic and was living in Italy, encountered a thoroughly demoralized Adams in a Rome bar.

On the night of February 7, 1968, his lawyer and friend, ex-LAPD officer Ervin Roeder, drove to the actor's house at 2126 El Roble Lane in Beverly Hills to check on him after a missed dinner appointment. Seeing a light on and his car in the garage, Roeder broke through a window and discovered Adams in his upstairs bedroom, slumped dead against a wall.

During the autopsy Dr. Thomas Noguchi found enough paraldehyde, sedatives and other drugs in the body "to cause instant unconsciousness". The death certificate lists "paraldehyde and promazine intoxication" as the immediate cause of death, along with the notation "accident; suicide; undetermined." During the 1960s, drug interaction warnings were not so prominent as they later would be, and the American Medical Association has subsequently warned these two types of drugs should never be taken together.

The death of Nick Adams has been cited in articles and books about Hollywood's unsolved mysteries along with speculation by a few of his acquaintances that he was murdered (according to author David Kulczyk, Adams was apparently planning to write a tell-all book revealing many sexual secrets of Hollywood names) and claims no trace of paraldehyde (a liquid sedative often given to alcoholics at the time and one of two drugs attributed to his death) was ever found in his home. However, Adams' brother Andrew had become a medical doctor and prescribed the sedative to him. Moreover, a story in the Los Angeles Times reported stoppered bottles with prescription labels were found in the medicine cabinet near the upstairs bedroom where Adams's body was discovered. Through the years, his children offered speculation ranging from murder to accidental death, the latter perhaps caused by Roeder while trying to calm the actor's nerves with an unintentionally lethal combination of alcohol and prescription drugs (although the autopsy found no alcohol in Adams' blood). Actor Robert Conrad, Adams's best friend, consistently maintained that the death was accidental.

Carol Adams is listed as Adams's spouse on his death certificate, evidence the divorce had not become final when the actor died. She and the children were living only a few blocks from his recently rented house on El Roble Lane.

Adams' remains were interred at Saints Cyril and Methodius Ukrainian Catholic Cemetery in Berwick, Pennsylvania. The back side of his gravestone, which bears a silhouette of Adams wearing the Civil War–era cap from his television series, is inscribed "Nick Adams — The Rebel — Actor of Hollywood Screens".

In 2026, Adams was announced as a posthumous inductee into the Luzerne County Arts & Entertainment Hall of Fame.

== Later published speculation ==
=== Sexuality ===
Decades later, Adams' highly publicized life and death at a young age, his friendships with cultural icons such as James Dean and Elvis Presley, and his reported drug consumption made his private life the subject of many reports and assertions by some writers who have claimed Adams may have been gay or bisexual. One of the earliest published mentions on this overall topic was made by gossip columnist Rona Barrett in her 1974 autobiography Miss Rona, in which she made no assertion Adams was homosexual or bisexual but claimed Adams had told her, along with a "whole roomful of people," that he wasn't making it because no one in Hollywood's upper stratosphere would accept his wife Nugent. Barrett called it "untrue. She was one of the most refreshing wives in the entire community" and went on to say Adams "had become the companion to a group of salacious homosexuals" who flattered the actor, which affected his judgment and caused him to blame Nugent. Hollywood biographer Lawrence J. Quirk claimed Mike Connolly (a gay gossip columnist for The Hollywood Reporter from 1951 to 1966) "would put the make on the most prominent young actors, including Robert Francis, Guy Madison, Anthony Perkins, Nick Adams, and James Dean." According to American Film (1986), "Nick Adams, who was ...gay, was the butt of anti-gay humor in Pillow Talk".

Some writers later called Adams a "Hollywood hustler" or a "street hustler". One journalist also refers to Adams as a "pool hustler" who made money in pool halls when he was a teenager in New Jersey and later while struggling to make ends meet during his early years in Hollywood.

=== Friendship with Dean and Presley ===
It is uncertain whether James Dean and Adams met before his service in the United States Coast Guard (1952–1955) and subsequent role in Rebel Without a Cause (1955). In his 1986 gossip book about gay Hollywood, Conversations with My Elders, Boze Hadleigh claimed actor Sal Mineo told him in 1972, "I didn't hear it from Jimmy (James Dean), who was sort of awesome to me when we did Rebel, but Nick told me they had a big affair." According to Presley biographer Albert Goldman, "Nick Adams ingratiated himself with James Dean precisely as he would do a year or so later with Elvis. He offered himself to the shy, emotionally contorted and rebellious Dean, as a friend, a guide, a boon companion, a homosexual lover – whatever role or service Dean required." Journalist, screenwriter and author of books about Hollywood, John Gregory Dunne wrote that "James Dean was bisexual, as were Nick Adams and Sal Mineo." According to Eric Braun, "Elvis was attracted by Adams' outgoing personality and the young actors caused quite a stir, cruising round Los Angeles with Natalie Wood, Russ Tamblyn and others on their Hondas." In 2005, Byron Raphael and Presley biographer Alanna Nash wrote that Adams may have "swung both ways" like "Adams's good pal (and Elvis's idol) James Dean. Tongues wagged that Elvis and Adams were getting it on."

=== Studio-arranged dates ===
Adams regularly dated actresses with whom he made movies. During the mid-1950s, photographs of him with actress Natalie Wood were widely publicized in fan magazines. Modern Screen wrote at the time "their relationship has been mostly for fun" and they shared "a tendency toward moodiness and unpredictability." The magazine also reported they had given joint interviews "in which they admitted they adored each other" and "they even came terribly close to getting married" in Las Vegas. The same article also remarked that on one of their trips they "posed for innumerable publicity photographs—that was the real reason for the trip—" and "Right now, both Nick and Natalie are inclined to deny the whole Las Vegas episode." In his 2004 biography Natalie Wood: A Life biographer and screenwriter Gavin Lambert wrote in passing, Wood's "first studio-arranged date with a gay or bisexual actor had been with Nick Adams." In his biography of gay Hollywood agent Henry Willson, Robert Hofler deals with the rise of the studio star system, in which several actors spent time on the homosexual casting couch and dated girls or even entered into sham marriages in order to cover their homosexuality. "In the Henry Willson date pool," the author says, "Nick Adams was one client, among many, who glommed on to Natalie Wood to get his picture taken." Suzanne Finstad cites actor Jack Grinnage, one of the gang members in Rebel Without a Cause, about Nick Adams' and Dennis Hopper's reasons "for getting close to Natalie. 'I remember being in Dennis' dressing room with Nick and Natalie ... I don't know which one of them said this—it was Nick or Dennis—but he said, "We're gonna hang on to her bra straps." Meaning up the career ladder.' Natalie's tutor, who knew Hopper and Adams off set, said, 'Both of those two guys were all over her ... because they could see that this movie was going to be a big thing for Natalie ... they were game for anything in order to be noticed and to get ahead in the business.'"

Actress Olive Sturgess relates: "When Nick and I went out, it was a casual thing—no great love or anything like that ... I thought he was very troubled ... You could feel he was troubled. It was the manner he had —that was the way he was in real life, always brooding ... When we went out, it was never on his motorcycle! That's one trick he couldn't pull on me. We always went in a car!"

=== Lack of confirmation ===
Because of morality clauses in studio contracts, along with practical marketing concerns, most homosexual actors during the 1950s and 1960s were forced to be discreet about their sexuality. However, Adams was known in Hollywood for embellishing and inventing stories about his show business experiences and long tried to capitalize on his associations with James Dean and Elvis Presley. In a brief biographical article, journalist Bill Kelly wrote Adams "became James Dean's closest pal, although Nick was straight and Dean was bisexual." Moreover, there are neither court documents (such as from the long and drawn-out divorce and child custody proceedings between him and his wife), personal letters from Adams nor directly attributable statements by any alleged male lovers to support the assertions.

== Filmography ==
Film
Year	Title	Role	Notes
1952	Somebody Loves Me	Western Union Boy	Uncredited
1955	Strange Lady in Town	Billy the Kid	
1955	Mister Roberts	Reber	
1955	Rebel Without a Cause	Chick	
1955	Picnic	Bomber	
1955	I Died a Thousand Times	Bell Boy	Uncredited
1956	Our Miss Brooks	Gary Nolan	
1956	A Strange Adventure	Phil Davis	Alternative title: White Nightmare
1956	The Last Wagon	Ridge	
1956	Giant	Jett Rink	Voice, Uncredited
1957	Fury at Showdown	Tracy Mitchell	
1957	Sweet Smell of Success	Hot-Dog Stand Customer	Uncredited
1958	Sing, Boy, Sing	C.K. Judd	
1958	Teacher's Pet	Barney Kovac	
1958	No Time for Sergeants	Pvt. Benjamin B. Whitledge	
1959	The FBI Story	John Gilbert "Jack" Graham	
1959	Pillow Talk	Tony Walters	
1962	Hell is for Heroes	Homer Janeczek	
1962	The Interns	Dr. Sid Lackland	
1963	The Hook	Pvt. V.R. Hackett	
1963	Twilight of Honor	Ben Brown	Alternative title: The Charge is Murder; Nominated for the Academy Award for Best Supporting Actor
1964	The Young Lovers	Tarragoo	
1965	Young Dillinger	John Dillinger	
1965	Frankenstein vs. Baragon	Dr. James Bowen	
1965	Die, Monster, Die!	Stephen Reinhart	Alternative titles: Monster of Terror; The House at the End of the World
1965	Invasion of Astro-Monster	Glenn	Alternative titles: Monster Zero; Godzilla vs. Monster Zero
1966	Don't Worry, We'll Think of a Title	KEB Agent	Uncredited
1967	The Killing Bottle	John Carter	Alternative titles: International Secret Police: Driven to the Wall; Zettai zatsumi
1967	Mosby's Marauders	Sgt. Gregg	
1968	Fever Heat	Ace Jones	Released posthumously
1968	Mission Mars	Nick Grant	Released posthumously
1968	Silent Treatment	Tailor	Released posthumously
1968	Los Asesinos	Shannon	Released posthumously

Television
Year	Title	Role	Notes
1956	The People's Choice	Augie	Episode: "Sock and Augie"
1957	Playhouse 90	Sandy	Episode: "The Troublemakers"
1958	Richard Diamond, Private Detective	Mickey Houseman	Episode: "Juvenile Jacket"
1958	Wanted: Dead or Alive	Andy Martin	Episode: "The Martin Poster"
1958	Cimarron City	John Hartman Jr.	Episode: "Twelve Guns"
1958	Letter to Loretta	Chip Davidson	Episode: "Out of Control"
1958	Steve Canyon	Sgt. Korman	Episode: "Operation Crash Landing"
1958–1959	Zane Grey Theatre	Lynn Parsons; George Pelletti	2 episodes
1958–1959	Trackdown	Various	3 episodes
1958–1961	Wagon Train	Antonio "Tonio"; Sam Upton	2 episodes
1959	Yancy Derringer	Duke Alexis	Episode: "The Night the Russians Landed"
1959	Tales of Wells Fargo	Ira Watkins	Episode: "The Tired Gun"
1959	The David Niven Show	Sgt. Pete Manners	Episode: "Portrait"
1959–1961	The Rebel	Johnny Yuma	76 episodes Wrote 38 episodes, credited as creator
1961–1962	The Dick Powell Show	Nick Phillips; George Townsend	2 episodes
1961–1962	General Electric Theater	Paul Madsen; Richard Martin	2 episodes
1962	Checkmate	Weiler aka "Kid"	Episode: "A Chant of Silence"
1962	The Joey Bishop Show	Singer Snooky Bradford	Episode: "The Big Date"
1962–1963	Saints and Sinners	Nick Alexander	18 episodes
1963	77 Sunset Strip	Max Dent	Episode: "By His Own Verdict"
1963–1965	Burke's Law	Various	5 episodes
1963–1967	Combat!	Pvt. Mick Hellar; Cpl. Marty Roberts	2 episodes
1964	Arrest and Trial	Ronnie Blake	Episode: "A Roll of the Dice"
1964	The Outer Limits	Mike Benson	Episode: "Fun and Games"
1964	The Reporter	Roger	Episode: "How Much for a Prince?"
1964	Voyage to the Bottom of the Sea	Jason Kemp	Episode: "Turn Back the Clock"
1964	Rawhide	Corporal Dasovik	Episode: "Corporal Dasovik"
1965	Ben Casey	Orin Reid	Episode: "Three Li'l Lambs"
1966–1968	The Wild Wild West	Prince/Sheriff Dave Cord	2 episodes
1967	The Monroes	Dave	Episode: "Gun Bound"
1967	Hondo	Apache Kid	2 episodes
