= Twilight of Honor =

1963 film by Boris Sagal

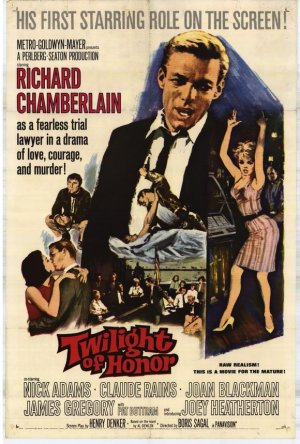
- Directed by: Boris Sagal
- Written by: Henry Denker
- Based on: Twilight of Honor; 1961 novel by Al Dewlen
- Produced by: William Perlberg; George Seaton
- Starring: Richard Chamberlain; Nick Adams
- Cinematography: Philip H. Lathrop
- Edited by: Hugh S. Fowler
- Music by: Johnny Green
- Production company: Perlberg-Seaton Productions
- Distributed by: Metro-Goldwyn-Mayer
- Release date: October 16, 1963
- Running time: 104 minutes
- Country: United States
- Language: English

Twilight of Honor is a 1963 American courtroom drama directed by Boris Sagal and based on the novel by Al Dewlen. The screenplay was written by Henry Denker. The film stars Richard Chamberlain in his first feature film lead role and features the debuts of Joey Heatherton and Linda Evans. Produced by MGM and released in the United Kingdom as The Charge is Murder, the film explores controversial themes for its time, including sexual assault, adultery, and prostitution. It received Academy Award nominations for Best Supporting Actor (Nick Adams) and Best Art Direction.

== Plot ==
In a small New Mexico town, young lawyer David Mitchell is appointed to defend Ben Brown, who has confessed to killing an off-duty police officer, Cole Clinton. The ambitious prosecutor, Norris Bixby, is pursuing the death penalty, aiming to succeed a respected retired district attorney, Art Harper—Mitchell's mentor. Though initially reluctant, Harper agrees to advise Mitchell on the case. Harper's daughter, Susan, volunteers to assist Mitchell and reignites her romantic interest in him.

Mitchell meets Ben's wife, Laura-Mae, who turned him in and claims he beat her. She portrays Ben as a liar and says the murder happened during a robbery. Ben, however, claims his confession was coerced and that Clinton was committing adultery with Laura-Mae at the time. Mitchell and Harper find legal precedent in New Mexico law that classifies homicide committed in the act of discovering a spouse's adultery as justifiable.

At jury selection, Mitchell objects to the panel's bias—many jurors were friends of the victim—but is overruled. Bixby leaks Ben's confession to the press, influencing public opinion. In court, witnesses depict Ben as violent and suggest he targeted Clinton for money. Mitchell argues Clinton intended to sleep with Laura-Mae, causing his widow to faint.

Mrs. Clinton later confirms her husband pursued younger women and offers to plead for leniency if Mitchell drops the adultery defense to spare her daughter's feelings. Mitchell declines. Clinton's doctor testifies there's no proof of intercourse at the time of death. Despite Mitchell's protests, Bixby calls Mrs. Clinton to testify. She denies all allegations. Mitchell, moved by her grief, declines to cross-examine her.

A military officer testifies that Ben became unstable after marriage, went AWOL, and once attempted suicide. On the stand, Ben recounts meeting Laura-Mae in a bar and falling for her quickly. After marrying her and bailing her out of jail, they hitchhiked across the country. Clinton picked them up, showed his badge, and later, Ben found him in bed with Laura-Mae. A fight ensued, during which Ben killed Clinton with his own gun. Ben maintains he still loves Laura-Mae, even though she betrayed him and sought reward money.

Bixby accuses Ben of pimping Laura-Mae to Clinton. Because a spouse can't testify against their partner without being called by the defense, Bixby pressures Mitchell into doing so. The judge adjourns court before she can speak.

Later, Mitchell visits Laura-Mae and sees Bixby's married co-counsel, Judson Elliot, arrive for a tryst. Mitchell confronts Bixby and Elliot in the judge's chambers and threatens to expose the affair if Laura-Mae is aggressively cross-examined. He also reveals Elliot is carrying Clinton's money clip. Elliot is dismissed from the case.

In court, Harper arrives to support Mitchell during closing arguments. Mitchell accuses the prosecution of manipulating the trial to protect Clinton's reputation and further Bixby's career. Bixby focuses on Ben's confession and reminds the jury of their loyalty to Clinton. After deliberation, the jury finds Ben not guilty on all charges.

Following the verdict, Harper acknowledges Mitchell's newfound reputation and passes the torch. The film ends with Mitchell and Susan walking home together, suggesting a new beginning.

== Cast ==
- Richard Chamberlain – David Mitchell
- Nick Adams – Ben Brown
- Claude Rains – Art Harper
- Joan Blackman – Susan Harper
- James Gregory – Norris Bixby
- Joey Heatherton – Laura Mae Brown
- Pat Buttram – Cole Clinton
- Jeanette Nolan – Amy Clinton
- Edgar Stehli – Judge James Tucker
- James Bell – Charles Crispin
- George Mitchell – District Attorney Paul Farish
- Don 'Red' Barry – Judson Elliot (as Donald Barry)
- Bert Freed – Sheriff B.L. 'Buck' Wheeler
- Robin Raymond – Therese 'Tess' Braden
- June Dayton – Vera Driscoll
- Linda Evans - Alice Clinton

== Production ==
The film is based on Twilight of Honor, a novel by Al Dewlen that won the McGraw-Hill Fiction Award in 1961. The rights were acquired by producers George Seaton and William Pearlberg, who were working under contract at MGM. Pearlberg produced the film, while Seaton, then engaged on 36 Hours, did not direct. The screenplay was written by Henry Denker.

Nick Adams was initially cast in September 1962. In March 1963, Richard Chamberlain—then known for his role as Dr. Kildare on television—was given the lead role. His casting drew attention due to the film's adult themes, which contrasted with his clean-cut image. Boris Sagal, primarily known for television work, was brought on to direct.

Joey Heatherton was cast following her appearance on The Nurses, while Linda Evans, then under contract with MGM, made her film debut.

Filming began in May 1963 during a production break in Chamberlain's television schedule. The film was part of a slate of projects developed under new MGM president Robert O'Brien. Composer Johnny Green returned to MGM to write the score—the first time in five years.

The film's copyright was later renewed.

== Awards ==
The film was nominated for two Academy Awards:

- Best Supporting Actor – Nick Adams
- Best Art Direction (George Davis, Paul Groesse, Henry Grace, Hugh Hunt)

== See also ==
- List of American films of 1963
