= Mission Mars (film) =

1968 film directed by Nicholas Webster

- Theatrical release poster
- Directed by: Nick Webster
- Screenplay by: Mike St. Clair
- Story by: Aubrey Wisberg
- Produced by: Everett Rosenthal
- Starring: Darren McGavin; Nick Adams; George De Vries; Michael DeBeausset
- Cinematography: Cliff Poland
- Edited by: Paul Jordon
- Music by: Berge Kalajian, Gus Pardalis, The Forum Quorum
- Production company: Red Ram Productions
- Distributed by: Allied Artists Pictures
- Release date: July 26, 1968 (United States)
- Running time: 90 minutes
- Country: United States
- Language: English

Mission Mars is a 1967 American science fiction film. It was produced by Everett Rosenthal, with a screenplay by Mike St. Clair from a story by Aubrey Wisberg, and directed by Nick Webster.

== Plot ==
The United States launches three astronauts on a mission to land on Mars at around the same time that the Soviet Union launches its own secret Mars mission. On their way to Mars, the American astronauts encounter the drifting bodies of two Soviet cosmonauts, who they realize must have been buried in space. The American spacecraft lands safely on Mars, albeit farther away than planned from its accompanying supply capsule. The astronauts set out toward the supply capsule, leaving a line of balloons to mark their trail. They discover that there is a hole burned into the supply capsule's hull and that the balloons have been removed. They also discover a third cosmonaut, standing frozen in a state of suspended animation, who revives once brought inside the American spacecraft.

The astronauts then encounter a strange creature (called a "Polarite"), which threatens them but which they neutralize by firing beam weapons at its single red eye. Ground controllers advise the astronauts that the Polarites seem to be robots controlled by an external influence. An alien sphere appears on the Martian surface; when Duncan, one of the astronauts, approaches the sphere he is dragged inside by a mysterious force and killed. The sphere is emitting a force field which prevents the American spacecraft from taking off.

An attempt to escape by using booster rockets from the supply capsule fails. The cosmonaut tells the Americans that the sphere can be deactivated by destroying a disc inside it. Nick Grant, the American geologist-astronaut, volunteers to do so and succeeds at the cost of his life. Col. Mike Blaiswick, the surviving American astronaut, and the Soviet cosmonaut escape Mars in the American spacecraft and learn that Blaiswick's wife is pregnant.

== Cast ==
- Darren McGavin: Col. Mike Blaiswick
- Nick Adams: Nick Grant
- George De Vries: Duncan
- Michael DeBeausset: Cliff Lawson
- Heather Hewitt: Edith Blaiswick
- Shirley Parker: Alice Grant

== Reception ==
Science fiction scholar Gary Westfahl stated in his book The Spacesuit Film that Mission Mars "devolves into a conventional monster movie." Writing for The Encyclopedia of Science Fiction, Westfahl found the Martian plants to be strikingly bizarre and the low-budget film to be of about average quality for science fiction films of the era. Writer Thomas Kent Miller commented in Mars in the Movies: A History, "The last 50 minutes of this 90-minute movie about the first trip to Mars would have made a wonderful episode of the original 1960s Outer Limits ... But as a theatrical movie, it's beyond awful (as bad as the same director's Santa Claus Conquers the Martians)." Miller cited the special effects as interesting. TV Guide gave the movie one out of five stars. While it liked the ending, and the use of a non-humanoid alien, it found the movie overall to be plodding, dull and amateurish.

== Production ==
The movie includes stock footage of Cape Kennedy. It was the first movie to be made at Miami's Studio City Complex. It was also released in the UK as Murder in the Third Dimension.

== See also ==
- List of films set on Mars
