= Two on a Guillotine =

1965 film by William Conrad

- Theatrical release poster
- Directed by: William Conrad
- Screenplay by: John Kneubuhl; Henry Slesar
- Story by: Henry Slesar
- Produced by: William Conrad
- Starring: Connie Stevens; Dean Jones; Cesar Romero; Parley Baer; Virginia Gregg; John Hoyt
- Cinematography: Sam Leavitt
- Edited by: William H. Ziegler
- Music by: Max Steiner
- Production company: William Conrad Productions
- Distributed by: Warner Bros. Pictures
- Release date: January 13, 1965
- Running time: 107 minutes
- Country: United States
- Language: English

Two on a Guillotine is a 1965 American horror film produced and directed by William Conrad and starring Connie Stevens, Dean Jones, Cesar Romero, and Parley Baer. The screenplay by John Kneubuhl and Henry Slesar is based on a story by Slesar. The plot follows a young woman who must spend seven nights in the isolated mansion of her father—a deceased, deranged illusionist—in order to inherit his fortune.

The film would be the first in a series of low-budget suspense dramas made by Warner Bros. Pictures in the vein of the successful William Castle films, and was followed by My Blood Runs Cold and Brainstorm, both also released in 1965 with Conrad as director. A fourth movie, The Thing at the Door, was proposed, but never made.

== Plot ==
John Harley Duquesne, a psychotic stage magician, accidentally beheads his wife Melinda with a guillotine during a performance. Twenty years later he dies, and his will requires his daughter Cassie (the image of her mother) to spend seven nights in his apparently haunted mansion in order to inherit his estate.

Reporter Val Henderson offers to stay with her when he learns Duquesne promised to return in spirit form during Cassie's week-long vigil. As the days pass, the two encounter a number of spooky happenings, leading to a climax in which the very-much-alive Duquesne attempts a recreation of his guillotine trick, this time with his daughter as an unwilling assistant.

Henderson fights Duquesne, trying to prevent him from activating the guillotine, but accidentally releases the catch; a dummy's head falls from the guillotine causing Duquesne to break down thinking his wife has been killed. Henderson rescues Cassie as the police come to arrest Duquesne.

== Cast ==
- Connie Stevens as Cassie/Melinda Duquesne
- Dean Jones as Val Henderson
- Cesar Romero as John Harley Duquesne
- Parley Baer as Buzzy Sheridan
- Virginia Gregg as Dolly Bast
- John Hoyt as Carl Vickers

== Production ==
Two on a Guillotine was one of a series of movies financed by Warner Bros which were made by directors who had previously worked primarily in television, such as Conrad, Lamont Johnson and Jack Smight.

Filming started in June 1964, and lasted three weeks.

Stevens was under contract with Warner Bros. She said, "I thought the script was stupid when I read it but I came away thinking, 'yeah, it could have happened.' That's the challenge, to make something like this believable." She made the movie immediately before her series Wendy and Me, and asserted that it "could have been a Class A thriller if they'd spent more money on it." She noted that the feature did garner Conrad a seven-year contract with the studio, however.

== Music ==
Two on a Guillotine was the last movie scored by Max Steiner. He commented, "it wasn't a picture, it was an abortion ... The guillotine was placed in the wrong place ... they should have cut off William Conrad's head for producing the thing."

== Release ==
Two on a Guillotine was theatrically released in the United States on January 13, 1965. In the New York metropolitan area, a performer named "Dr. Guillotine" appeared at select showings where he performed a magic show for audiences before the film.

=== Home media ===
The film was released on DVD on June 22, 2010 by the Warner Archive Collection.

== Reception ==
=== Critical response ===
In his review in The New York Times, Howard Thompson called the film "a dull, silly, tedious clinker" and "an old-fashioned, haunted-house spooker." The Los Angeles Times called it "an unusually appealing love story" with "genuinely spine-tingling suspense."

TV Guide rates it two out of a possible four stars, calling it "a standard haunted house thriller."

== Comic book adaptation ==
- Dell Movie Classic: Two on a Guillotine (April–June 1965)

== See also ==
- List of American films of 1965
