= Ray Heatherton =

American actor

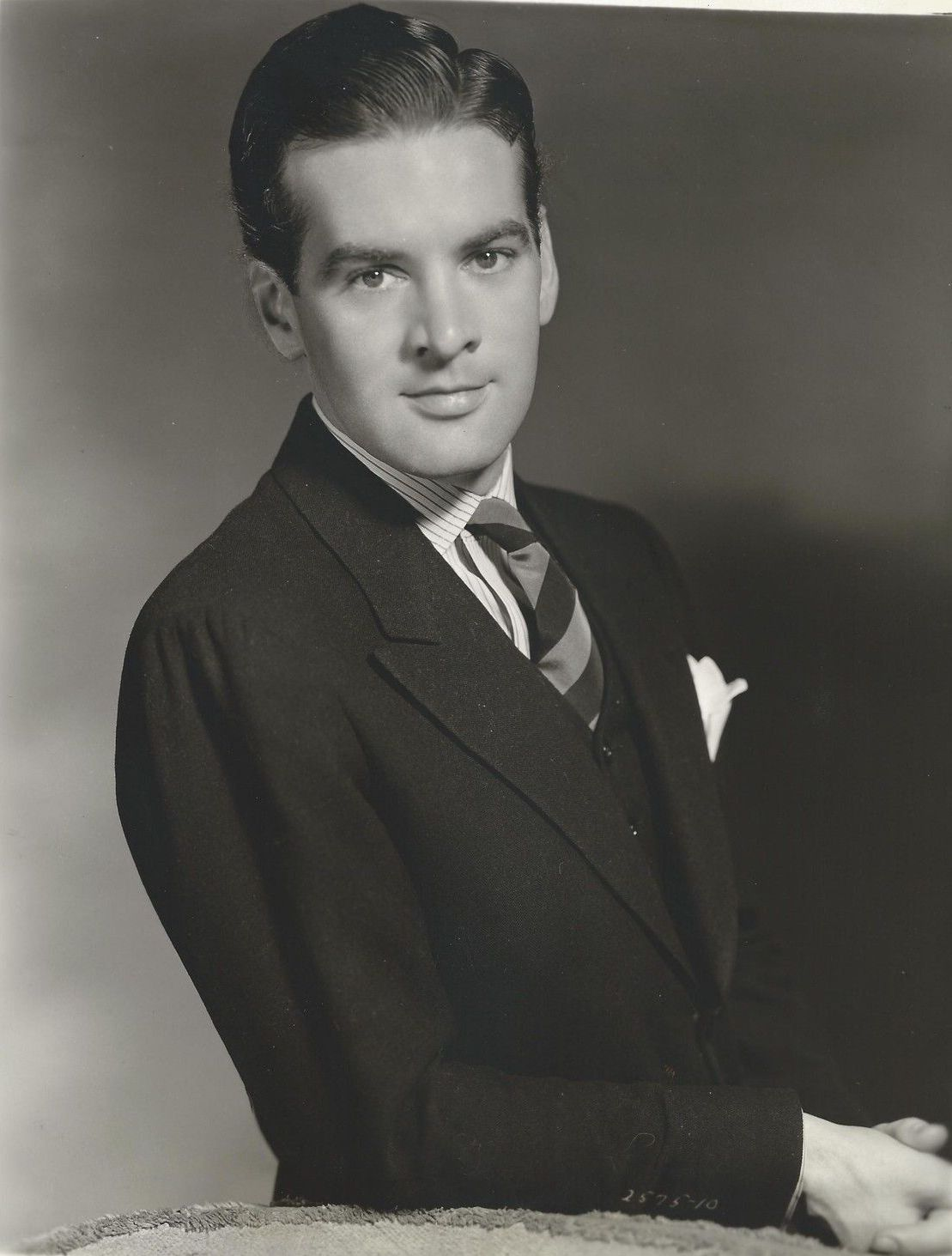
- Heatherton circa 1937
- Born: June 1, 1909; Orange, New Jersey, US
- Died: August 15, 1997 (aged 88); Englewood, New Jersey, US
- Occupations: Vocalist; Actor
- Spouse: Davenie Ross Watson (m. 1941; d. 1988)
- Children: 2, including Joey Heatherton

Ray Heatherton (June 1, 1909 – August 15, 1997) was an American singer, Broadway musical theatre performer, and a New York City television personality in the early days of the medium.

== Early career ==
Ray Heatherton was born in the New York City suburb of Orange, New Jersey (some sources indicate Jersey City) and was first introduced to music upon joining a boys' choir at his church. He sang with the choir until his family moved to another of the city's suburbs, the Long Island village of Floral Park before moving to nearby Rockville Centre.

During his high school years, he continued to find outlets for his singing talents, performing with bands at various local functions and winning a radio talent contest sponsored by the manufacturer of radio sets, Atwater Kent. His first appearance on Broadway was in The Garrick Gaieties, a revue which opened at the Guild Theatre on June 4, 1930, three days after his 21st birthday. During this time, Heatherton also attended Columbia University.

Shortly afterward, Ray Heatherton's singing talents came to the attention of the era's best-known radio bandleader-songwriter, Paul Whiteman. Whiteman hired the young man to become a featured vocalist on his 1929–30 CBS radio program The Old Gold Hour. Heatherton continued to sing on the show, while also performing in the musical Midnight Frolics at Broadway's New Amsterdam Theatre.

Following his father's death during the Depression, he was temporarily forced to leave show business to work for the New York Telephone Company. His affection for performing, however, inspired him to continue auditioning for radio assignments and he was eventually able to return as a singer on numerous radio musical variety series, and also found opportunities to perform in nightclubs and theater. In the late 1930s, he became a bandleader with his own orchestra which made recordings and performed at New York's Biltmore Hotel.

== Broadway shows, recordings and pre–World War II television ==
Heatherton appeared in the musicals Anniversary Waltz, The Desert Song, and Babes in Arms, in which he played the role of Val LaMar the character about whom "My Funny Valentine" was sung.

In 1938 Heatherton recorded two discs of songs for children on the Decca label, and in 1939 twice performed on the then-experimental medium of television, appearing on NBC's New York station W2XBS (now WNBC) in Gilbert and Sullivan's Pirates of Penzance (as Frederic) and H.M.S. Pinafore (as Ralph Rackstraw).

== Single film appearance and war service in the Marines ==
As World War II arrived, Heatherton's career in the entertainment field was interrupted by service in the U.S. Marine Corps. Before leaving, he made his only film appearance, performing a song and a few lines of dialogue in PRC's musical Follies Girl (1943).

Heatherton was commissioned and rose to the rank of Captain. He served as Special Services officer of the 9th Marine Aircraft Wing at Marine Corps Air Station Cherry Point North Carolina as well as Guam and Okinawa.

== Early television and The Merry Mailman ==
Returning from the service, he worked in radio and began his full-time television career as the host, performer and interviewer of Heatherton House, a weekday-morning talk/variety series. Heatherton House was one of the first daytime programs on ABC's newly opened New York flagship station WJZ (now WABC), Channel 7. The minor local-TV assignment, which was not shown on the fledgling network's other stations, only lasted from April to June 1949.

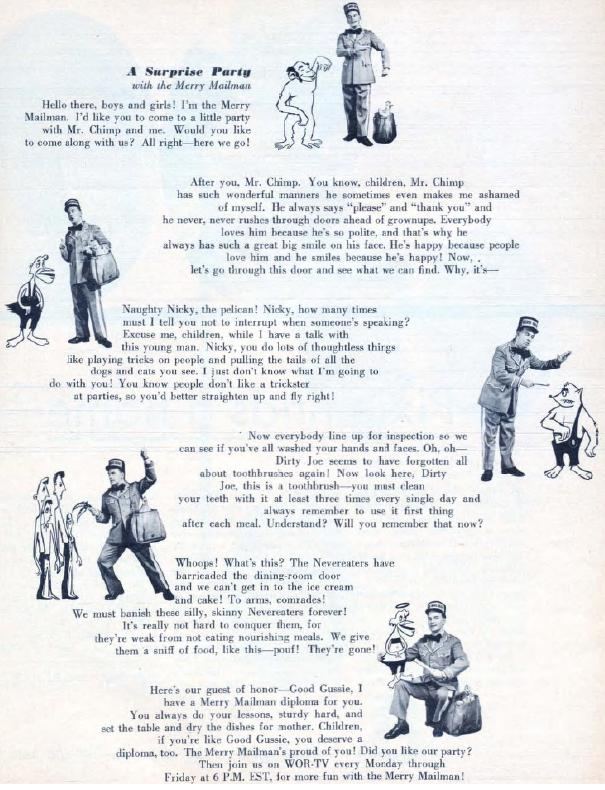
Heatherton as the "Merry Mailman", 1951

Heatherton's next TV series, The Merry Mailman, was a more successful endeavor. In October 1949, independent station WOR Channel 9, the last of New York's seven VHF TV outlets, signed on the air. Station executives decided that one of the new venture's first showcases should be a quality children's program, and contacted Heatherton to audition as the host of a show that would appeal to the younger TV viewers. The successful audition launched the long-running show that he created and shaped with radio and TV producer-director (and future major film producer) Sandy Howard. The Merry Mailman, based upon a character performed by Heatherton on one of his 1938 children's records, debuted on WOR-TV Monday evening, October 16, 1950.

Every weekday afternoon and evening, as well as on Saturday afternoons, Ray Heatherton and his comedy assistants Chick Darrow, who played "The Topsey-Turvey Auctioneer", and Milt Moss would entertain and inform their studio audiences and kids at home with games, songs, stories, craftmaking, hobbies, comedy, puppet skits, magic tricks, interviews with guest performers and personalities, and informational segments. As with virtually all children's shows of the 1950s and 60s, the format was structured so that the live segments were interspersed with cartoons—in this case, primarily the theatrical Terrytoons and the first made-for-TV animated series Crusader Rabbit. At the same time, Heatherton hosted other radio and TV series, including a radio edition of The Merry Mailman which was heard on the Mutual Radio Network Monday, Wednesday and Friday evenings, and Saturday and Sunday afternoons from 1953 to 1955. Heatherton's gentle personality and pleasant singing voice and endearingly cheerful and reassuring demeanor made him one of the most beloved and recognizable regional personalities.

== Career setback and continued work ==
In late 1955, Ray Heatherton fell victim to one of the excesses of the Cold War era. A number of innocent performers were accused of Communist affiliations and lost their careers. Unfounded public accusations of that nature were aimed at Heatherton by an individual from Upstate New York, resulting in the loss of sponsors and bad publicity for the station. WOR executives accepted Heatherton's word that the allegations were false and tried to keep The Merry Mailman on the air as a station-sustained program. It was not enough, however, and The Merry Mailman broadcast its final show on Friday, June 22, 1956. (Information about Mr. Heatherton’s hosting the WOR-TV Channel 9 New York City edition of The Merry Mailman can be found in The NYC Kids’ Shows Roundup section of TV Party.Com.)

Heatherton was able to clear his name of the defamation and went on to host two more programs for WOR-TV: The Ray Heatherton Theater, a combination live-action and film musical anthology series for teens, and The Cartoon Parade, both of which were seen during the remainder of the station’s 1956 season. He remained on the air for another year and a half, but no longer had a daily venue. Starting Saturday-Sunday, September 8–9, 1956 until Sunday, April 13, 1958, he served as the “sea captain” host-performer on the weekend evening edition of The Popeye Show on another New York independent station, WPIX Channel 11 which, along with another New York independent, WNEW Channel 5 was, during the 1950s and 60s, the station with the greatest number of “kiddie shows” on its broadcast schedule. At this point, he left television for three years and, between 1958 and 1961, drawing on his public recognition and good will he had engendered over the years, was able to launch a new career as head of public relations for Franklin National and European American Banks.

== 1960s and the return of The Merry Mailman ==
Heatherton returned to television and radio work three more times during the 1960s, 70s and 80s. On Monday, September 25, 1961, The Merry Mailman once again became a part of the lives of children in the New York City broadcast area. WPIX, Channel 11 broadcast The Merry Mailman's Funhouse weekday afternoons during the noon-12:45 period when many schoolkids came home for lunch. However, the series fell prey to creative disagreements within station management, and The Funhouse went off the air on Friday, May 31, 1963.

During this time, Heatherton appeared at many New York area venues, including Freedomland U.S.A. in The Bronx, to meet and entertain children. He appeared at Freedomland during 1962. Chick Darrow also appeared at the park on numerous occasions. Both are mentioned in the book Freedomland U.S.A.: The Definitive History (Theme Park Press, 2019).

Following intermittent job opportunities, Heatherton returned to radio in the late 1960s as the host/performer and interviewer of the nationally syndicated talk/variety program Ray Heatherton's Breakfast Club.

== Family, later work, illness, and death ==
Ray Heatherton married Davenie Ross Watson in 1941, and their 47-year marriage lasted until her death in 1988. Their two children, Dick and Davenie Johanna (Joey), both made their careers in show business—Dick as a performer, director and consultant and Joey as an actress, singer and dancer who became a major television star in the 1960s.

Ray is the grandfather of Dana Fujiko Heatherton, who was 2009–2010 Nisei Week Queen for Los Angeles.

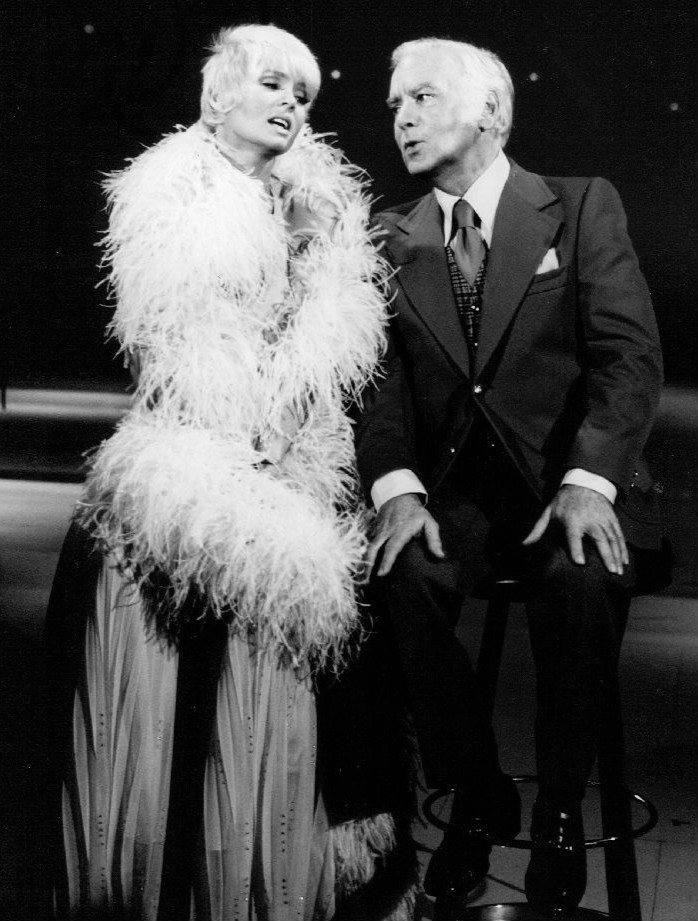
Father and daughter performing on Joey and Dad

In July 1975, Ray and Joey had a brief moment of network glory with their own CBS-TV variety program, Joey and Dad. Times had changed and variety shows, as well as Joey's once-hot career fell victim to changing tastes, while Ray was seen on TV at the time as the commercial spokesman for Tropicana Orange Juice. However, for four weeks, July 6–27, they were the stars of the Sunday 7:30-8:30 p.m. summer replacement for Cher's variety hour. Comedy performers Pat Paulsen, Henny Youngman and Bob Einstein were supporting regulars and, by summer-show standards, the program received relatively good notices and ratings. In a nostalgic moment on the first show, Ray put on the Merry Mailman uniform and performed his familiar "I Am the Merry Mailman" theme song.

Heatherton's last regular TV series was another talk/variety show, this time aimed at "mature" adults and senior citizens, A New Day's Dawning. The series was seen locally in New York on New York City Board of Education's TV station WNYE Channel 25 and in national syndication between 1983 and 1985. Dick Heatherton who, from the mid-1970s to the late 1980s was a drive-time DJ on one of New York's top FM stations, WCBS, worked on his father's final TV effort by signing on as the show's producer.

On Thursday night, October 11, 1984, Ray Heatherton appeared for the last time on WOR-TV, Channel 9 during the station's evening-long celebration of its 35th anniversary on the air. Four years later, on Thursday, September 29, 1988, he made his final TV appearance on a very similar program, WPIX-TV, Channel 11's day-long celebration and retrospective of its 40 years on the air, "WPIX at 40". Following this last appearance, Ray Heatherton began showing signs of Alzheimer's disease. He retained the positions he held since the mid-1980s on the boards of directors of the Long Island Lighting Company (LILCO) and the Garden City Hotel, but he no longer served by the early 1990s.

In 1993, Heatherton was admitted to the Actors' Fund Home in Englewood, New Jersey, where he spent the last four years of his life. Despite the debilitating effects of the disease, he still made appearances and greeted fans at some local functions nearby. Ray Heatherton died two and a half months after his 88th birthday.
