= William Conrad =

American actor and director (1920–1994)

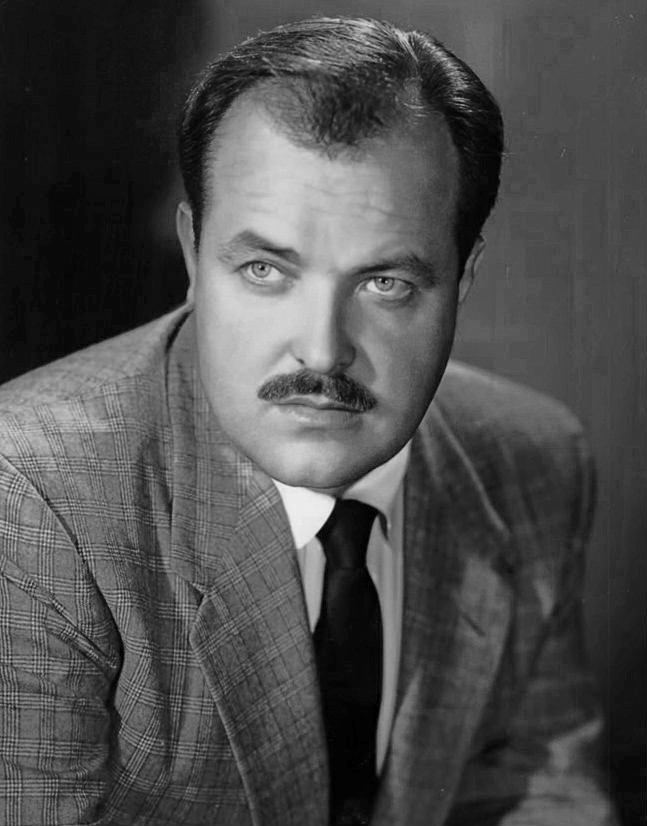
- Conrad in 1952
- Born: John William Cann Jr. September 27, 1920; Louisville, Kentucky, U.S.
- Died: February 11, 1994 (aged 73); Los Angeles, California, U.S.
- Education: Excelsior Union High School; Fullerton College (AA)
- Occupations: Actor; director; producer
- Years active: 1940–1994
- Known for: Cannon; Jake and the Fatman; The Fugitive; The Killers
- Spouses: June Nelson (m. 1943; div. 1957) Susan Randall (m. 1957; died 1979) Lewis Tipton Stringer Huntley (m. 1980)
- Children: 1
- Awards: National Radio Hall of Fame
- Military career
- Allegiance: United States
- Branch: United States Army Air Forces
- Service years: 1943–1945
- Rank: Captain

William Conrad (born John William Cann Jr., September 27, 1920 – February 11, 1994) was an American actor, producer, and director whose entertainment career spanned five decades in radio, film, and television.

A radio writer and actor, he moved to Hollywood after serving in World War II as a fighter pilot and played a series of character roles in films, beginning with the film noir The Killers (1946). He originated the role of Marshal Matt Dillon for the radio series Gunsmoke (1952–1961) and narrated the television adventures of Rocky and Bullwinkle (1959–1964), Dudley Do-Right of the Mounties (1959–1964), The Fugitive (1963–1967), and Hoppity Hooper (1964–1967).

Finding fewer onscreen roles in the 1950s, he changed from actor to producer-director with television work, narration, and a series of Warner Bros. films in the 1960s. Conrad found stardom as a detective in the TV series Cannon (1971–1976) and Nero Wolfe (1981) and as district attorney Jason Lochinvar "J. L., Fatman" McCabe in the legal drama Jake and the Fatman (1987–1992).

== Early life ==
William Conrad (also known as John William Conrad) was born John William Cann Jr., on September 27, 1920, in Louisville, Kentucky. His parents, John William Cann and Ida Mae Upchurch Cann, owned a movie theatre, and Conrad grew up watching movies. The family moved to Southern California where as William Cann he attended Excelsior Union High School in Norwalk. He majored in drama and literature at Fullerton College, in Orange County, California, and began his career as an announcer, writer, and director for Los Angeles radio station KMPC.

Conrad served as a fighter pilot in World War II. On the day he was commissioned in 1943 at Luke Field, he married June Nelson (1920–1977) of Los Angeles. He left the United States Army Air Forces with the rank of captain and as a producer-director of the Armed Forces Radio Service.

== Career ==
=== Radio ===
Conrad estimated that he played more than 7,500 roles during his radio career. At KMPC, the 22-year-old Conrad produced and acted in The Hermit's Cave (c. 1940–1944), the Los Angeles incarnation of a popular syndicated horror anthology series created at WJR Detroit.

Conrad was among the supporting cast for the espionage drama The Man Called X (1944–1948); the syndicated dramatic anthology Favorite Story (1946–1949); the adventure dramas The Count of Monte Cristo (Mutual 1947–1948), The Voyage of the Scarlet Queen (Mutual 1947–1948), The Green Lama (CBS 1949), and Night Beat (NBC 1950–1952); Romance (1950); Hollywood Star Playhouse (1950–1953); Errol Flynn's The Modern Adventures of Casanova (Mutual 1952); and Cathy and Elliott Lewis's On Stage (CBS 1953–1954).

Conrad was the voice of Escape (1947–1954), a high-adventure radio series. He played Warchek, a menacing policeman, in Johnny Modero: Pier 23 (Mutual 1947), a detective series starring Jack Webb, and was in the cast of Webb's crime dramas Dragnet (NBC, 1947–1951) and Pete Kelly's Blues (NBC, 1951). He played newspaper editor Walter Burns opposite Dick Powell's reporter Hildy Johnson in the ABC radio drama The Front Page (1948). He was Dave the Dude in the syndicated drama anthology series The Damon Runyon Theater (1948); Lt. Dundy in the NBC radio series The Adventures of Sam Spade (1949–1950); boss to government special agent Douglas Fairbanks Jr. in The Silent Men (NBC 1951); and a New Orleans bartender in the NBC adventure drama Jason and the Golden Fleece (1952–1953). Most prominently, Conrad's deep, resonant voice won him the role of Marshal Matt Dillon on CBS Radio's gritty Western series Gunsmoke (1952–1961). The producers originally rejected him for the part because of his ubiquitous presence on so many radio dramas and the familiarity of his voice, but his impressive audition could not be dismissed, and he became the clear choice for the role. Conrad voiced Dillon for the show's nine-year run, and he wrote the June 1953 episode "Sundown". When Gunsmoke was adapted for television in 1955, executives at CBS did not cast Conrad or his radio costars despite a campaign to get them to change their minds.

His other credits include Yours Truly, Johnny Dollar; Lux Radio Theatre; Fibber McGee and Molly; and Suspense. In "The Wax Works", a 1956 episode of Suspense, Conrad performed every part. Because of his CBS Radio contract, he sometimes appeared on shows on other networks under the pseudonym "Julius Krelboyne".

In January 1956, Conrad was the announcer on the debut broadcast of The CBS Radio Workshop, a two-part adaptation of Aldous Huxley's Brave New World, which Huxley himself narrated. "On the air, The CBS Radio Workshop was a lightning rod for ideas," wrote radio historian John Dunning, who cites Conrad's tour de force performances in the subsequent broadcasts "The Legend of Jimmy Blue Eyes" (March 23, 1956) and "A Matter of Logic" (June 1, 1956). Conrad directed and narrated the 1957 episode "Epitaphs", an adaptation of Edgar Lee Masters's poetry volume Spoon River Anthology.

"And '1489 Words' (Feb. 10, 1957) remains a favorite of many, a powerful Conrad performance proving that one picture is not necessarily worth a thousand words," Dunning concluded. "A lovely way to end a day, a decade, or an era."

=== Film ===
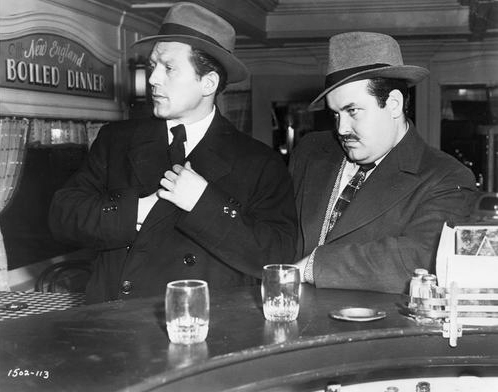
Charles McGraw and William Conrad in The Killers, Conrad's film debut

As an actor in feature films, Conrad was often cast as a threatening figure. His most notable role may be the first for which he was credited, as one of the gunmen sent to eliminate Burt Lancaster in The Killers (1946). Conrad also appeared in Body and Soul (1947), Sorry, Wrong Number (1948), Joan of Arc (1948), and The Naked Jungle (1954).

In 1961, Conrad moved to the production side of the film business, producing and directing for Warner Bros. film studio. In 1965 he produced and directed Two on a Guillotine, My Blood Runs Cold and Brainstorm as well as narrating the opening of Battle of the Bulge. Brainstorm was a latter-day film noir that has come to be regarded as "a minor masterpiece of the 1960s" and "the final, essential entry in that long line of films noir that begins at the end of the Second World War."

Conrad was the executive producer of Countdown (1968), a science-fiction thriller starring James Caan and Robert Duvall that was the major studio feature début of director Robert Altman.

Conrad narrated the documentary Design for Disaster, produced by the Los Angeles City Fire Department, about the November 1961 Bel Air wildfire that gutted several neighborhoods, at the time the worst conflagration in Los Angeles history.

As a token of appreciation from Jack L. Warner, head of Warner Bros., Conrad received one of the two original lead-metal falcon statues used in the classic film The Maltese Falcon (1941). The falcon sat on a bookshelf in Conrad's house from the 1960s. Standing 11.5 in (29.2 cm) high and weighing 45 lb (20.4 kg), the figurine had been slashed during the making of the film by Sydney Greenstreet's character Kasper Gutman, leaving deep cuts in its bronze patina. After Conrad's death, the statue was consigned by his widow Tippy Conrad to Christie's, which estimated it would bring $30,000 to $50,000 at auction. In December 1994, Christie's sold the falcon for $398,500. The purchaser was Ronald Winston, president of Harry Winston, Inc. jewelers. In 1996, Winston resold the prop to an unknown European collector "at an enormous profit" – for as much as $1 million.

Late in life, Conrad narrated the opening and closing scenes of the 1991 Bruce Willis feature film Hudson Hawk.

=== Television ===
==== Voice ====
As "Bill Conrad", he narrated and contributed character voices to Jay Ward's animated Rocky and Bullwinkle series from 1959 to 1964. Conrad's "narrator" voice in this series was far removed from his usual rumbling baritone. He adopted a brisk, high-pitched, nasal tenor that suited the mock urgency of the narratives. He reserved this voice for the Rocky cartoons and did not employ it elsewhere.

Conrad narrated This Man Dawson, a 33-episode syndicated crime drama starring Keith Andes in the 1959–1960 television season, and then became the familiar voice narrating The Fugitive, starring David Janssen, on ABC television from 1963 to 1967. He also introduced Count Basie's Orchestra and Frank Sinatra on Sinatra's 1966 Live at the Sands album.

Conrad intoned a rhyming narration heard over the credits of the 1970 John Wayne film Western Chisum. His voice is heard in the Clio Award-winning 1971 public-service announcement about pollution featuring Iron Eyes Cody, created for Earth Day by Keep America Beautiful and the Ad Council. From 1973 to 1978, Conrad narrated the TV nature program Wild, Wild World of Animals. Also during the 1970s, he appeared in and narrated a number of episodes for ABC's American Sportsman and in the CBS documentary The Lost Treasure of the Concepcion. He later narrated The Making of Star Wars (1977), the disaster documentary Catastrophe! (1977), the 1978 World Series U.S.-baseball highlight film, Buck Rogers in the 25th Century (1979), and The Rebels (1979). Conrad also performed the role of Denethor in the 1980 animated TV version of J. R. R. Tolkien's The Return of the King. His other voice work included narration for The Highwayman and the "High Flight" sign-off featuring an F-15.

==== Directing ====
Conrad directed episodes of NBC's Klondike in the 1960–1961 season. His other credits as a director include episodes of The Rifleman, Bat Masterson, Route 66, Have Gun – Will Travel, 77 Sunset Strip, Temple Houston and Ripcord, as well as ABC's crime drama Target: The Corruptors!.

==== Acting ====
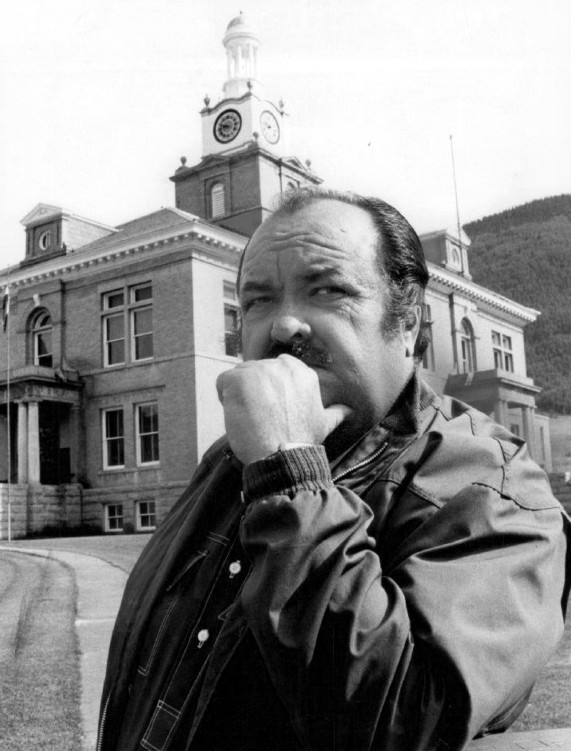
William Conrad in Cannon (1972)

Conrad guest-starred in NBC's science-fiction series The Man and the Challenge and in the syndicated skydiving adventure series Ripcord, with Larry Pennell and Ken Curtis. In 1962, he starred in an episode of The Alfred Hitchcock Hour and guest-starred in episodes of ABC's crime drama Target: The Corruptors!. He appeared as Major Anatole Karzof in a 1984 episode of Murder, She Wrote called "Death Takes a Curtain Call".

From 1971 to 1976, he starred in the television detective series Cannon, which was broadcast on CBS. While starring in the show, he weighed 230 pounds (104 kg), and ballooned to 260 pounds (118 kg) or more.

"I heard that Weight Watchers had banned its members from watching the show, but it turned out to be a gag," Conrad said in 1973. "The publicist for Weight Watchers did call and suggest that I have lunch with their president. I said sure – if I could pick the restaurant."

From the early 1980s to the early 1990s, he starred in two other TV series, Nero Wolfe (in the title role of Rex Stout's brilliant detective, 1981) with Lee Horsley, and Jake and the Fatman (1987–1992) with Joe Penny.

==== Hosting ====
Throughout the 1970s and into the 1980s, Conrad served as the armchair-and-fireside host of the CBS All-American Thanksgiving Day Parade morning broadcasts in which he anchored the network's annual holiday telecast of parades from around the U.S. and Canada, including parades from Detroit, Hawaii, New York City, Philadelphia, and Toronto.

==== Other appearances ====
In the 1970s and 1980s, Conrad appeared in a few Pittway First Alert Smoke Alarm commercials as the host, explaining the need for the alarms.

== Personal life ==
In 1957, Conrad was married to former fashion model Susan Randall (1928–1979), and the couple had one son, Christopher. In 1980, Conrad married Tippy Stringer (1930–2010), a broadcast pioneer and the widow of NBC newscaster Chet Huntley. She helped manage his career during their 14-year marriage.

== Hobbies ==
Conrad was an avid outdoorsman and accomplished fisherman. Having been known for his prowess using light tackle, as documented in the magazine Field & Stream, on May 23, 1972, in the Yucatán Channel of Mexico, Conrad caught a 62 lb, 4 oz sailfish on thread-like 6-lb-test line.

== Death ==
Conrad died of a heart attack at age 73 in Los Angeles on February 11, 1994. He was buried in Forest Lawn, Hollywood Hills Cemetery, California.

== Recognition ==
Conrad was posthumously elected to the National Radio Hall of Fame in 1997, and also to the Broadcasting and Cable Hall of Fame.

== Filmography ==
=== Actor ===
Year	Title	Role	Notes
1945	Pillow to Post	First Motorcycle Cop	Uncredited
1946	The Killers	Max	
1947	Body and Soul	Quinn	
1948	Arch of Triumph	Policeman at Accident	Uncredited
1948	To the Victor	Farnsworth	
1948	Four Faces West	Sheriff Egan	
1948	Sorry, Wrong Number	Morano	
1948	Joan of Arc	Guillaume Erard, a Prosecutor	
1949	Any Number Can Play	Frank Sistina	
1949	East Side, West Side	Lt. Jacobi	
1950	Tension	Lt. Edgar Gonsales	
1950	One Way Street	Ollie	
1950	The Milkman	Mike Morrel	
1950	Dial 1119	Chuckles	
1951	Cry Danger	Castro	
1951	The Sword of Monte Cristo	Major Nicolet	
1951	The Racket	Detective Sergeant Turk	
1952	Lone Star	Mizette	
1953	Cry of the Hunted	Goodwin	
1953	The Desert Song	Lachmed	
1954	The Naked Jungle	Commissioner	
1954	The Bob Mathias Story	Narrator	Voice, Uncredited
1955	5 Against the House	Eric Berg	
1956	The Conqueror	Kasar	
1956	Johnny Concho	Tallman	
1957	The Ride Back	Sheriff Chris Hamish	
1957	Zero Hour!	Narrator	Voice, Uncredited
1958	The Rough Riders	Wade Hacker	Episode: "The Governor"
1958–1961	Bat Masterson	Clark Benson / Dick MacIntyre	2 episodes
1959	-30-	Jim Bathgate	
1959–1960	This Man Dawson	Narrator	39 episodes
1959–1961	Rocky and His Friends	Narrator	TV series, Voice, Credited as Bill Conrad
1961	The Aquanauts	Corey	Episode: "Killers in Paradise"
1961	Dudley Do-Right	Narrator	Voice, 1 episode, Uncredited
1961–1964	The Bullwinkle Show	Narrator	TV series, Voice, Credited as Bill Conrad
1962	Gorath	Narrator	Uncredited
1962	Geronimo	Narrator	Voice, Uncredited
1962	Target: The Corruptors!	Dan	Episode: "Yankee Dollar"
1962	Have Gun – Will Travel	Moses Kadish / Norge	2 episodes
1962	GE True	Dr. James Fallon	Episode: "Circle of Death"
1962	Design for Disaster	Narrator	Short film about the 1961 Los Angeles ' fires
1963	The Alfred Hitchcock Hour	Sergeant Cresse	Season 1 Episode 15: "The Thirty-First of February"
1963–1964	77 Sunset Strip	Clapper / Bystander / Maestrian	Uncredited, 4 episodes
1963–1967	The Fugitive	Narrator	Voice, Uncredited, 120 episodes
1965	Two on a Guillotine	The Fat Man in the Hall of Mirrors	Uncredited
1965	My Blood Runs Cold	Helicopter Pilot	Voice, Uncredited
1965	Brainstorm	Mental Patient	Uncredited
1966	Hoppity Hooper	Narrator	Uncredited
1965	F Troop	Narrator	Voice, Uncredited, Episode: "Scourge of the West"
1965	Battle of the Bulge	Narrator	Uncredited
1966	Chamber of Horrors	Narrator	Voice, Uncredited
1967	First to Fight	Narrator	Voice, Uncredited
1967	Countdown	TV Newscaster	Voice, Uncredited
1969	The Name of the Game	Arnold Wexler	Episode: "The Power"
1970	It Takes a Thief	Strategy Room Announcer	Voice, Uncredited, Episode: "Situation Red"
1970	Chisum	Narrator	Voice, Uncredited
1970	The Brotherhood of the Bell	Bart Harris	TV movie
1970	The High Chaparral	China Pierce	Episode: "Spokes"
1970	Men at Law	Kornedi	Episode: "Survivors Will Be Prosecuted"
1971	The D. A.: Conspiracy to Kill	Chief Vincent Kovac	TV movie
1971	O'Hara, U.S. Treasury	Keegan	TV movie
1971–1976	Cannon	Frank Cannon	120 episodes
1973	Gunsmoke	Narrator	Episode: "Women for Sale"
1973, 76	The Carol Burnett Show	Himself	2 episodes
1973–1975	Barnaby Jones	Frank Cannon	2 episodes
1973–1976	Wild, Wild World of Animals	Narrator	TV series
1974	The FBI Story: The FBI Versus Alvin Karpis, Public Enemy Number One	Narrator	TV movie, Voice, Uncredited
1975	Attack on Terror: The FBI vs. the Ku Klux Klan	Narrator	TV movie, Voice, Uncredited
1976	The Macahans	Narrator	TV movie
1977	The City	Narrator	TV movie, Voice
1977	The Force of Evil	Narrator	TV movie
1977	Moonshine County Express	Jack Starkey	
1977	The Making of Star Wars	Narrator	TV special
1977	Quinn Martin's Tales of the Unexpected	Host / Narrator	Voice, Uncredited, 8 episodes
1977	Catastrophe	Host / Narrator	
1977–1978	How the West Was Won	Narrator	Voice, Uncredited, 7 episodes
1978	Night Cries	Dr. Whelan	TV movie
1978	Keefer	Keefer	TV movie
1979	The Rebels	Narrator	TV movie, Voice
1979–1981	Buck Rogers in the 25th Century	Narrator	Voice, Uncredited
1980	Battles: The Murder That Wouldn't Die	William Battles	TV movie
1980	The Return of the King	Lord Denethor	TV movie, Voice
1980	Turnover Smith	Thaddeus Smith	TV movie
1980	The Return of Frank Cannon	Frank Cannon	TV movie
1980	Jockey	Host (Himself)	TV documentary movie, Directed by Martin Pitts Written by John Underwood
1980	The Tarzan/Lone Ranger Adventure Hour	The Lone Ranger	TV series, Voice, as J. Darnoc
1981	Nero Wolfe	Nero Wolfe	14 episodes
1981	Side Show	Ring Announcer	TV movie, Voice
1982	Police Squad!	Stabbed Man	Episode: "Testimony of Evil"
1982	Shocktrauma	Dr. R Adams Cowley	TV movie
1982	The Cremation of Sam McGee: A Poem by Robert W. Service	Narrator	Short, Voice
1983	The Mikado	The Mikado	TV movie
1983	Trauma Center	Narrator	Voice, Uncredited, 2 episodes
1983	Manimal	Narrator	Voice, Uncredited, 7 episodes
1984	Murder, She Wrote	Major Anatole Karzof	Episode: "Death Takes a Curtain Call"
1985	In Like Flynn	Sergeant Dominic	TV movie
1986	Hotel	Art Patterson	2 episodes
1986	Killing Cars	Mr. Mahoney	
1986	Vengeance: The Story of Tony Cimo	Jim Dunn	TV movie
1986	Matlock	D. A. James L. McShane	Episodes: "The Don: Part 1" and "The Don: Part 2"
1987	The Highwayman	Narrator	Uncredited, Episode: "The Highwayman"
1987–1992	Jake and the Fatman	Jason Lochinvar "Fatman" McCabe	103 episodes, (final appearance)
1991	Hudson Hawk	Narrator	Voice

=== Director ===
Year	Title	Notes
1955	Highway Patrol (TV series)	"The Trap"
1958	Target (TV series)	"The Unknown"
1959	Mackenzie's Raiders (TV series)	"The Pen and the Sword"
1959	Bold Venture (TV series)	"Go Fight Sidney Hall" "Dial M for Mother" "Oh Kaplan, My Kaplan" "The Last Hungry Man" "One of Our Friedkins Is Missing … Fine" "The Glittering Skull of Irving Tezcula"
1959	The Rifleman (TV series)	"Three Legged Terror"
1959	The Rough Riders (TV series)	"Deadfall"
1959–1960	This Man Dawson (TV series)	
1959–1960	Tombstone Territory (TV series)	"Marked for Murder" "The Black Diamond" "Silver Killers" "Memory" "The Governor"
1959–1961	Bat Masterson (TV series)	"Wanted: Dead" "The Reluctant Witness" "The Good and the Bad" "Ledger of Guilt"
1960	Lock-Up (TV series)	"Poker Club" "So Shall Ye Reap"
1960	Men into Space (TV series)	"Mission to Mars" "Mystery Satellite"
1960	Klondike (TV series)	"Klondike Fever" "Saints and Stickups"
1960–1961	The Case of the Dangerous Robin (TV series)	"The Nightmare" "The Caper" "Java"
1961	The Aquanauts (TV series)	"The Stakeout Adventure"
1961	Route 66 (TV series)	"First Class Mouliak"
1961	Naked City (TV series)	"A Kettle of Precious Fish" "The Day the Island Almost Sank" "Bridge Party"
1961–1962	Target: The Corruptors! (TV series)	"Prison Empire" "Play It Blue" "Babes in Wall Street" "My Native Land" "A Man's Castle" "Journey into Mourning" "A Book of Faces" "Yankee Dollar"
1962	Saints and Sinners (TV series)	"A Night of Horns and Bells"
1962–1963	Have Gun – Will Travel (TV series)	"One, Two, Three" "Don't Shoot the Piano Player" "Darwin's Man" "Genesis" "A Miracle for St. Francis" "The Black Bull"
1962–1963	GE True (TV series)	"Harris vs. Castro" "The Handmade Private" "The Last Day" "Man with a Suitcase" "Mile-Long Shot to Kill" "The Wrong Nickel" "The Amateurs" "Open Season" "Defendant Clarence Darrow" "O.S.I." "Firebug" "Escape" "The Moonshiners" "Security Risk" "The Black-Robed Ghost" "Ordeal" "Pattern for Espionage" "The Tenth Mona Lisa" "Commando"
1963	77 Sunset Strip (TV series)	six episodes
1963	The Man from Galveston	Television pilot of Temple Houston
1963–1964	Temple Houston (TV series)	"Billy Hart" "Thy Name Is Woman" "A Slight Case of Larceny" "The Gun That Swept the West" "The Town That Trespassed"
1963–1971	Gunsmoke (TV series)	"Panacea Sykes" "Captain Sligo"
1965	Two on a Guillotine	
1965	My Blood Runs Cold	
1965	Brainstorm	
1981	Side Show (TV movie)	

=== Producer ===
Year	Title	Notes
1957	The Ride Back	
1959–1960	This Man Dawson (TV series)	
1963	77 Sunset Strip (TV series)	"88 Bars"
1965	Two on a Guillotine	
1965	My Blood Runs Cold	
1965	Brainstorm	
1966	An American Dream	
1967	First to Fight	
1967	A Covenant with Death	
1967	The Cool Ones	executive producer
1968	Chubasco	
1968	Countdown	executive producer
1968	Assignment to Kill	executive producer
1980	Turnover Smith (TV movie)	executive producer
