= My Blood Runs Cold =

1965 film by William Conrad

- Theatrical poster
- Directed by: William Conrad
- Screenplay by: John Mantley
- Story by: John Meredyth Lucas
- Produced by: William Conrad
- Starring: Troy Donahue; Joey Heatherton; Barry Sullivan
- Cinematography: Sam Leavitt
- Edited by: William H. Ziegler
- Music by: George Duning
- Color process: Black and white
- Production company: William Conrad Productions
- Distributed by: Warner Bros. Pictures
- Release date: March 24, 1965
- Running time: 104 minutes
- Country: United States
- Language: English

My Blood Runs Cold is a 1965 American neo noir thriller film starring Troy Donahue, Joey Heatherton and Barry Sullivan. It was directed by William Conrad. It was the second of three thrillers Conrad made for Warner Bros. Pictures. A young woman falls in love with a man who may be insane.

== Plot ==
After a car accident, Julie meets a stranger who tells her he is in love with her. The young man, Ben Gunther, believes he and the young woman, Julie Merriday, are the reincarnations of lovers from an earlier time. Ben calls Julie 'Barbara' and gives her a gold locket with her picture in it. Ben takes her sailing and they swim to a cave where he tells her he found the locket. Aunt Sarah confirms Ben's stories that match the family history. Julie's controlling father and boyfriend distrust Ben. He convinces Julie of his beliefs and encourages her to run off with him to marry. Julie's need for independence leads her to say yes to Ben.

On a stormy night the couple sail away to elope. The father calls the Sheriff who discovers Ben's real name is Arthur Maine, an escaped murderer from an insane asylum. The police search for the sailboat by helicopter. Julie finds a diary of Benjamin H. Gunther dated 1874 on the boat that exposes Ben's fraud. Julie is scared but he still professes his love.

To escape the police, the couple land the boat but are seen running on a beach. There is an extended chase and boyfriend Harry tries to reason with 'Ben'. Julie escapes but the two men climb a high sand plant platform and in the struggle Ben falls to his death.

== Cast ==
- Troy Donahue as Ben Gunther
- Joey Heatherton as Julie Merriday
- Barry Sullivan as Julian Merriday
- Nicolas Coster as Harry Lindsay
- Jeanette Nolan as Aunt Sarah
- Russell Thorson as Sheriff
- Ben Wright as Lansbury
- Shirley Mitchell as Mrs. Courtland
- Howard McNear as Henry
- Howard Wendell as Mayor
- John Holland as Mr. Courtland
- John McCook as Owen

== Production ==
The movie was a considerable change of pace for Donahue. It was shot on the Monterey Peninsula in late 1964.

== Reception ==
=== Box office ===
The film was profitable.

=== Critical ===
The Washington Post called the film "woolly" and full of plotholes. The New York Times called it a "wordy, bloodless little Warner chiller." "A blah Troy Donahue and a bad script spoil the show" said the Los Angeles Times.

== See also ==
- List of American films of 1965
