= List of Surfside 6 episodes =

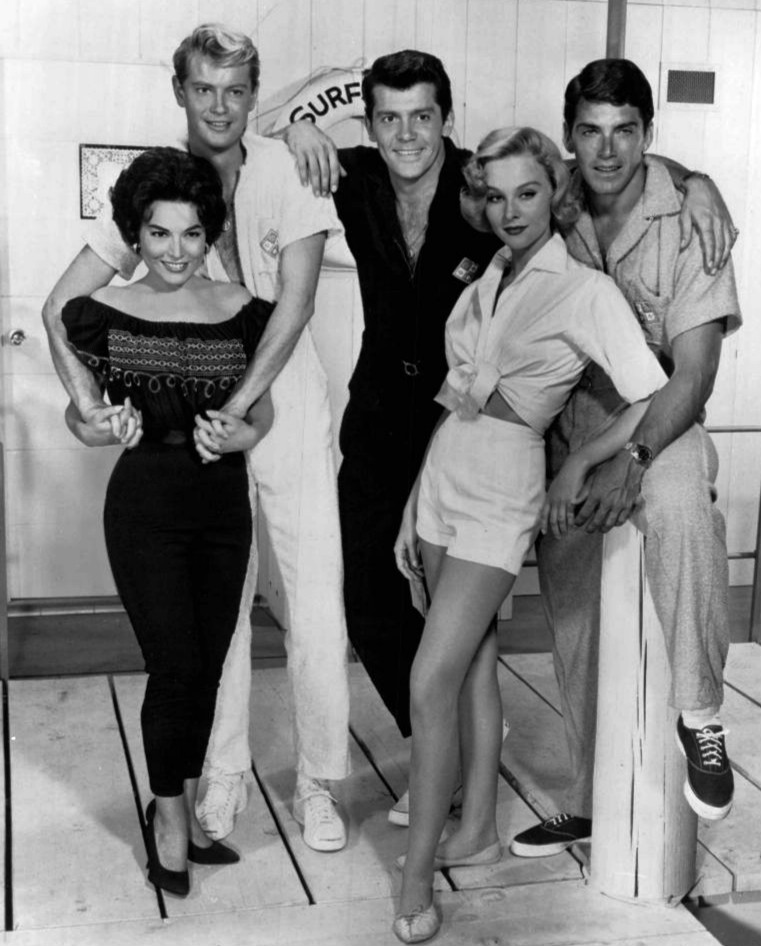
Surfside 6 cast members: Margarita Sierra, Troy Donahue, Lee Patterson, Diane McBain and Van Williams.

Surfside 6 is an American television series starring Troy Donahue, Van Williams, and Lee Patterson, and co-starring Diane McBain and Margarita Sierra. The show centers on a Miami Beach detective agency set on a houseboat. It premiered on ABC on October 3, 1960, and ended on June 25, 1962, with a total of 74 episodes over the course of 2 seasons.

== Series overview ==
Season	Episodes	Originally released	
Season	Episodes	First released	Last released
1	34	October 3, 1960	May 22, 1961
2	40	September 18, 1961	June 25, 1962

== Episodes ==
=== Season 1 (1960–61) ===
No.	Title	Directed by	Written by	Original release date
1	"Country Gentleman"	Irving J. Moore	M.L. Schumann & Anne Howard Bailey	October 3, 1960
Guest star: Ray Danton
2	"High Tide"	Montgomery Pittman	Montgomery Pittman & Robert J. Shaw	October 10, 1960
Featuring: Gregg Palmer
3	"The Clown"	Leslie H. Martinson	Lee Loeb	October 17, 1960
Guest stars: Don "Red" Barry, Vito Scotti, Ted de Corsia, Joe de Santis, Joel Grey, Mousie Garner
4	"According to Our Files"	George Waggner	Philip Saltzman & Richard DeRoy	October 24, 1960
5	"Local Girl"	Charles R. Rondeau	Richard DeRoy	October 31, 1960
6	"Par-a-kee"	William J. Hole Jr.	William L. Stuart	November 7, 1960
7	"Deadly Male"	Charles R. Rondeau	Lee Loeb	November 14, 1960
8	"Power of Suggestion"	Irving J. Moore	László Görög	November 21, 1960
Guest star: Shirley Knight
9	"Odd Job"	Robert Douglas	William L. Stuart	November 28, 1960
10	"The International Net"	William J. Hole Jr.	Dean Riesner	December 5, 1960
Guest star: Claude Akins
11	"The Frightened Canary"	Charles R. Rondeau	Sonya Roberts	December 12, 1960
Guest star: Ray Danton
12	"Girl in the Galleon"	Frank Baur	Charles Hoffman & Oliver Gard	December 19, 1960
Featuring: Dean Fredericks
13	"Bride and Seek"	Charles F. Haas	Anne Howard Bailey	December 26, 1960
Guest star: Grant Williams
14	"Little Star Lost"	Unknown	Unknown	January 2, 1961
15	"Heels over Head"	John Ainsworth	Michael Cramoy	January 9, 1961
16	"Facts on the Fire"	Charles R. Rondeau	Al C. Ward	January 16, 1961
Featuring: Robert Knapp
17	"Yesterday's Hero"	Charles R. Rondeau	Richard DeRoy	January 23, 1961
Guest star: Merry Anders
18	"Thieves Among Honor"	Robert Altman	Leo Solomon & Anne Howard Bailey	January 30, 1961
19	"License to Steal"	Charles R. Rondeau	Paul Savage & John D.F. Black	February 6, 1961
20	"Race Against Time"	Charles R. Rondeau	Joanne Court	February 13, 1961
Brad Johnson as Mr. Maxwell
21	"Black Orange Blossoms"	Robert B. Sinclair	Von Stuart	February 20, 1961
22	"The Chase"	Allen Baron	Roger Smith & Montgomery Pittman	February 27, 1961
23	"Ghost of a Chance"	Frank Baur	Gerald Drayson Adams	March 6, 1961
Featuring: Russ Conway
24	"The Impractical Joker"	Unknown	Unknown	March 13, 1961
25	"Inside Job"	Charles R. Rondeau	Philip Saltzman	March 20, 1961
Guest star: Mary Tyler Moore
26	"Invitation to a Party"	Paton Price	Erna Lazarus	March 27, 1961
27	"Spring Training"	Charles R. Rondeau	Ed Jurst & Leo Solomon	April 3, 1961
Guest star: Will Hutchins
28	"Double Image"	Unknown	Unknown	April 10, 1961
29	"Circumstantial Evidence"	Allen Baron	Anne Howard Bailey	April 17, 1961
30	"Vengeance Is Bitter"	Frank Baur	Lee Loeb	April 24, 1961
Guest star: Guy Stockwell
31	"Little Mister Kelly"	Charles R. Rondeau	Erna Lazarus	May 1, 1961
Featuring: Ronnie Dapo as Kelly
32	"Spinout at Sebring"	Charles R. Rondeau	Whitman Chambers	May 8, 1961
33	"The Bhoyo and the Blonde"	Michael O'Herlihy	Sonya Roberts	May 15, 1961
34	"An Overdose of Justice"	Michael O'Herlihy	Richard DeRoy	May 22, 1961
Guest star: Mara Corday

=== Season 2 (1961–62) ===
No. overall	No. in season	Title	Directed by	Written by	Original release date
35	1	"Count Seven!"	Richard C. Sarafian	Story by : Robert Martin; Teleplay by : William Bruckner	September 18, 1961
36	2	"The Wedding Guest"	Irving J. Moore	Story by : Vicki Shill; Teleplay by : Philip Saltzman	September 25, 1961
37	3	"One for the Road"	Robert Douglas	Richard Landau	October 2, 1961
38	4	"Daphne, Girl Detective"	Leslie Goodwins	Story by : J.P. Taylor; Teleplay by : Herman Groves	October 9, 1961
Guest star: Bruce Dern
39	5	"The Empty House"	Robert Douglas	Story by : Herman Epstein; Teleplay by : Gloria Elmore & Herman Epstein	October 16, 1961
40	6	"Witness for the Defense"	George Waggner	Whitman Chambers	October 23, 1961
Guest star: Lon Chaney Jr and Elisha Cook Jr
41	7	"Laugh for the Lady"	Leslie Goodwins	Erna Lazarus	October 30, 1961
Featuring: Barbara Stuart
42	8	"The Affairs at Hotel Delight"	Robert Douglas	Montgomery Pittman	November 6, 1961
Featuring: Med Flory
43	9	"Jonathan Wembley is Missing"	Irving J. Moore	Story by : William P. D'Angelo & Joel Rogosin; Teleplay by : William Bruckner	November 13, 1961
44	10	"The Old School Tie"	Michael O'Herlihy	Gloria Elmore	November 20, 1961
45	11	"A Matter of Seconds"	George Waggner	Story by : Larry Cohen; Teleplay by : Stephen Lord	November 27, 1961
Featuring: Ann McCrea
46	12	"Prescription for Panic"	Sidney Salkow	Douglas Morrow	December 4, 1961
47	13	"A Slight Case of Chivalry"	Harold Schuster	Michael Fessier	December 18, 1961
48	14	"Pattern for a Frame"	Irving J. Moore	Herman Groves	December 25, 1961
49	15	"The Roust"	Robert Douglas	John D.F. Black	January 1, 1962
50	16	"The Quarterback"	Paul Landres	Herman Groves	January 8, 1962
51	17	"Separate Checks"	Sidney Salkow	Ed Waters	January 15, 1962
52	18	"Artful Deceit"	Charles R. Rondeau	John O'Dea & Jack Jacobs	January 22, 1962
53	19	"Anniversary Special"	Robert Douglas	Sonya Roberts	January 29, 1962
54	20	"The Surfside Swindle"	George Waggner	Robert Vincent Wright	February 5, 1962
55	21	"Who is Sylvia?"	Unknown	Lee Loeb	February 12, 1962
56	22	"Find Leroy Burdette"	Robert Douglas	Jack Jacobs & John O'Dea	February 19, 1962
57	23	"Many a Slip"	Gunther V. Fritsch	Story by : Gloria Elmore & Richard Lipscomb; Teleplay by : Gloria Elmore	February 26, 1962
58	24	"The Green Beret"	Paul Landres	Charles B. Smith	March 5, 1962
59	25	"Vendetta Arms"	Robert Sparr	Sonya Roberts	March 12, 1962
Guest star: Dennis Hopper
60	26	"A Piece of Tommy Minor"	Richard Benedict	Story by : John O'Dea & Bronson Howitzer; Teleplay by : John O'Dea	March 19, 1962
Featuring: Ann McCrea; Cameo from The Frank Ortega Trio, the house band at Dino's, the club from 77 Sunset Strip
61	27	"Portrait of Nicole"	Otto Lang	Glenn Wolfe & Sol Stein	March 26, 1962
62	28	"Elegy for a Bookkeeper"	Paul Landres	Herman Groves	April 2, 1962
63	29	"The Money Game"	George Waggner	Story by : Frederic Brady; Teleplay by : Frederic Brady & Gloria Elmore	April 9, 1962
64	30	"Irish Pride"	Sidney Salkow	Ed Waters	April 16, 1962
65	31	"Green Bay Riddle"	Jeffrey Hayden	Story by : Whitman Chambers; Teleplay by : Herbert Purdum	April 23, 1962
66	32	"Love Song for a Deadly Redhead"	Richard Benedict	Dean Reiser	April 30, 1962
Featuring: Bobby Troup, Grace Lee Whitney, and Clegg Hoyt; Edd Byrnes as Kookie Kookson and Roger Smith as Jeff Spencer from 77 Sunset Strip appear
67	33	"Dead Heat"	Michael O'Herlihy	Jerry Thomas	May 7, 1962
68	34	"Squeeze Play"	Robert Sparr	Ken Pettus	May 14, 1962
69	35	"A Private Eye for Beauty"	Irving J. Moore	Story by : Robert Vincent Wright & Leonard Brown; Teleplay by : Gloria Elmore & Robert Vincent Wright	May 21, 1962
70	36	"Masquerade"	Paul Landres	Story by : Erna Lazarus; Teleplay by : Anthony Spinner & Erna Lazarus	May 28, 1962
71	37	"Pawn's Gambit"	Jeffrey Hayden	Herman Groves	June 4, 1962
72	38	"The Neutral Corner"	Jeffrey Hayden	Story by : Leonard Brown & William Bruckner; Teleplay by : William Bruckner	June 11, 1962
73	39	"House on Boca Key"	Robert Sparr	Herman Groves	June 18, 1962
74	40	"Midnight for Prince Charming"	George Waggner	Ken Pettus	June 25, 1962
