= The Key Man =

The Key Man may refer to:

- Key Man, a 1954 American film, also known as A Life at Stake
- The Key Man (1957 film), a British B movie
- The Key Man (2011 film), an American crime thriller film
