= Constance Ford =

American actress and model (1923–1993)

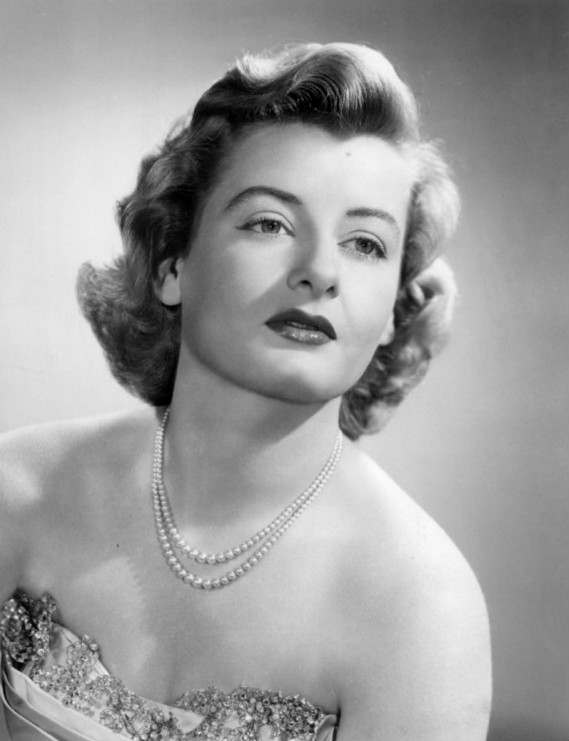
- Ford in 1956
- Born: Cornelia M. Ford; July 1, 1923; The Bronx, New York City, U.S.
- Died: February 26, 1993 (aged 69); Manhattan, New York City, U.S.
- Occupations: Actress, model
- Years active: 1938–1993

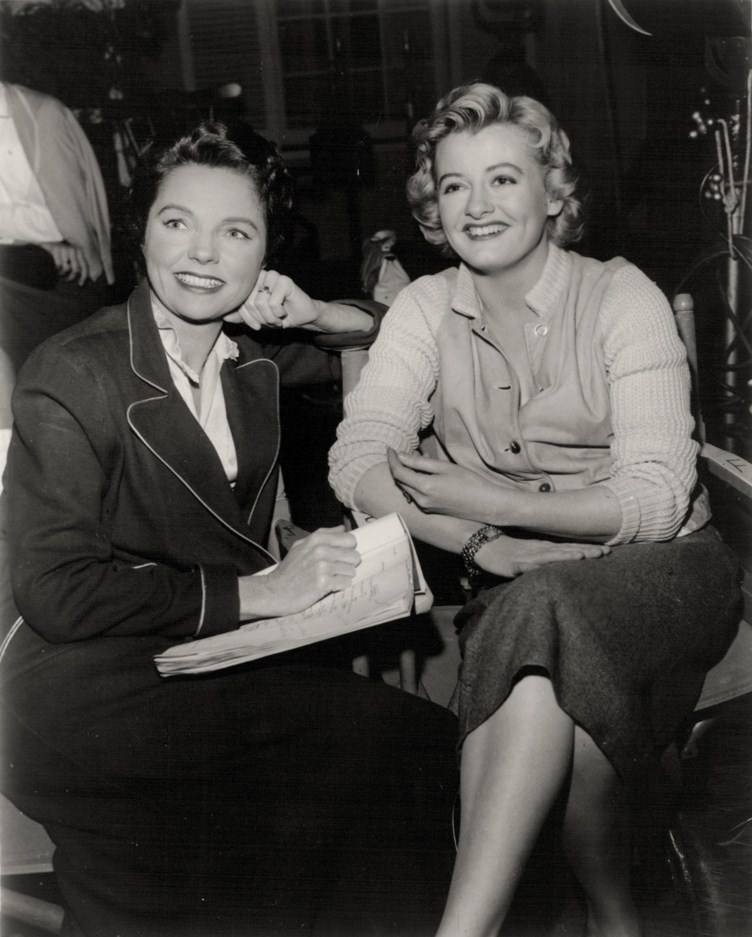
Jane Wyatt (left) & Constance Ford on the set of Father Knows Best, episode "An Extraordinary Woman" (1959)

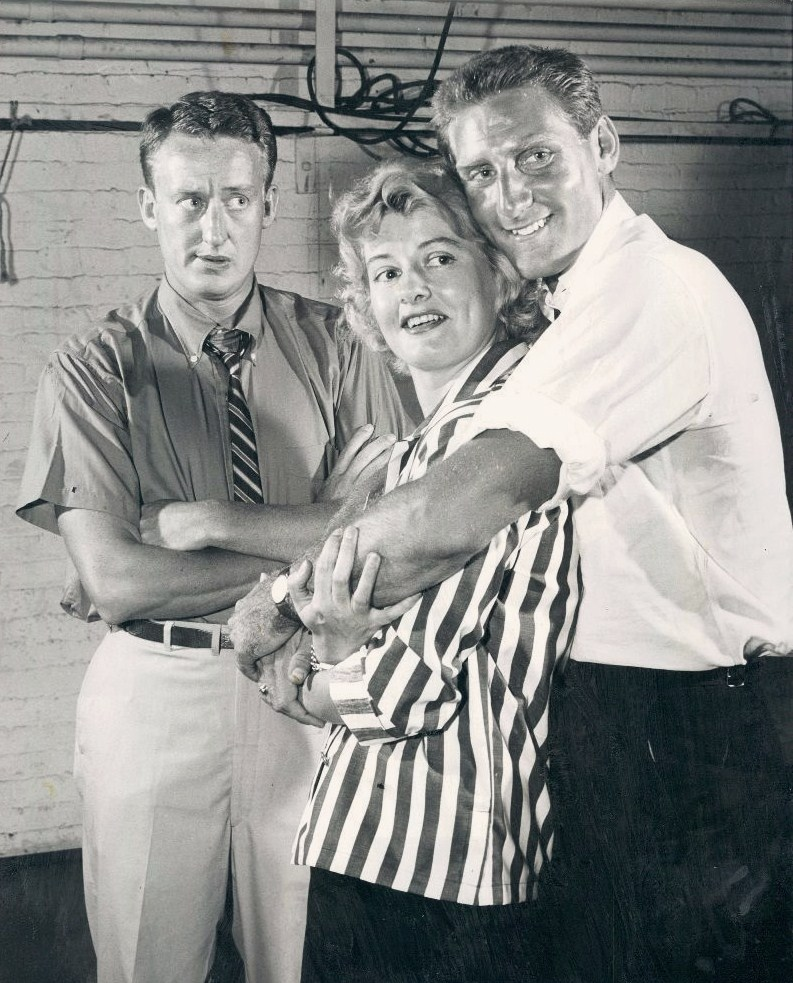
Tom Poston, Constance Ford, and Robert Elston in the Broadway production of Golden Fleecing (1959), written by Lorenzo Semple Jr.

Constance Ford (born Cornelia Marie Ford; July 1, 1923 – February 26, 1993) was an American actress and model. She portrayed Ada Lucas Hobson on the long-running daytime soap opera Another World, from 1967 until shortly before her death in 1993. She also appeared in nearly two dozen movies from 1956 to 1974, with her most noteworthy role being the matriarch Helen Jorgenson in A Summer Place (1959).

== Early years ==
Constance Ford was born Cornelia M. Ford on July 1, 1923, in The Bronx, to parents Cornelia R. (née Smith) and Edwin J. Ford. Her siblings were Arthur, John, and Evelyn. Ford was a graduate of St. Barnabas Grammar and High School, and she attended Hunter College. She studied acting at HB Studio in New York City.

== Career ==
Ford initially worked as a model for the Montgomery Ward catalog when she was 15 years old. Her face became famous in the Elizabeth Arden 1941 advertising campaign for Victory Red lipstick, which featured a Philippe Halsman photo showing her face against the American flag. She acted on Broadway from 1949, appearing in such productions as the musical Say Darling and Nobody Loves an Albatross. She also played the prostitute in the original Broadway production of Death of a Salesman.

She began her television career in 1950, with performances on live television dramas such as Studio One, Armstrong Circle Theatre, Goodyear Television Playhouse, and other acclaimed series. As a Warner Bros. contract player, she had her most famous role as Sandra Dee's mother in A Summer Place (1959), in which her abused husband Richard Egan had a scene telling her off for her outdated prejudices, and Ford arranges for Dee to be tested for her virginity. Another scene had Ford slapping Dee so hard that she fell into a Christmas tree, which toppled over on her. In Rome Adventure (1962), she played Daisy Bronson, owner of a bookstore in Rome, opposite Suzanne Pleshette and Troy Donahue, being kinder to him than she had been in A Summer Place. In House of Women, she played an aggressive but ultimately sympathetic female prisoner who gets into a catfight with prison matron Jeanne Cooper. She played the tough-as-nails nurse alongside Joan Crawford in The Caretakers (1963). She also had a walk-on playing a flirtatious but bored society matron who makes a play for Warren Beatty in All Fall Down.

She made three appearances on Perry Mason, including the role of a woman with multiple personality disorder in the 1958 episode "The Case of the Deadly Double", and as Frances Walden in "The Case of the Potted Planter" (1963) and defendant Sylvia Thompson in "The Case of the Shifty Shoebox" (also 1963). In 1960, she played heartless Connie Walworth ("You haven't got the flair, dear ...") for director Mitchell Leisen in the "Worse Than Murder" episode of Thriller. She was often featured in episodes of Kraft Television Theater, Appointment with Adventure, State Trooper, Dick Powell's Zane Grey Theatre (as Laura Lovett, opposite Jack Palance in the 1956 episode, "Lariat"), Bat Masterson, The Phil Silvers Show, Have Gun – Will Travel, Rawhide, Wanted: Dead or Alive, Tombstone Territory (episode "Silver Killers"), Gunsmoke (in the episode "Wagon Girls" and as title character in the episode "Poor Pearl" in 1956), Alfred Hitchcock Presents, Target: The Corruptors!, and The Twilight Zone episode "Uncle Simon". She also appeared on the NBC interview program Here's Hollywood.

In 1954, she made her soap-opera debut as Lynn Sherwood on Woman With A Past on CBS. On Search for Tomorrow, Ford was Rose Peterson, an employee of the mob, who was hired to discredit leading character Joanne Tate. Her on-screen brother was played by Don Knotts. On The Edge of Night, Ford played the murderous theatre owner Eve Morris.

=== Another World ===
In 1967, she joined Another World as Ada Lucas Davis, the strong-willed mother of Rachel (Robin Strasser and later Victoria Wyndham). While her mother character was a total contrast to her role of Helen in A Summer Place, she was brutally tough and honest, yet supportive and loving, first as a working-class mother to Rachel and later as a mentor to many of Bay City's young characters. Her first line, responding to brother Sam Lucas's inquiry, "Ada, is that you?" was a curt, "No, it's Princess Grace!"

Over the years, Ford played Ada's trials - she was divorced then widowed three times and worked in a variety of professions, from hairdressing to police clerk to restaurant owner. In 1975, middle-aged Ada gave birth to a daughter, Nancy.

Ford left the show in 1992 due to declining health, and Ada was said to be out of town visiting Nancy. When Ford died, the character of Ada also died, and the show paid tribute to character and actress both.

== Recognition ==
The National Academy of Television Arts and Sciences gave Ford a Certificate of Merit for Outstanding Contribution to Daytime Drama.

== Personal life ==
Ford was married to Shelley Hull, a son of actor Henry Hull, from 1946 to 1956. Ford was romantically linked to children's author Louise Fitzhugh in a biography of the latter, published in 2020.

Ford died in New York Hospital in Manhattan on February 26, 1993, from cancer, aged 69.

== Filmography and selected TV work ==
Year	Title	Role	Notes
1955	The Phil Silvers Show	Joy Landers	Season 1 Episode 8: "Mardi Gras"
1956	Alfred Hitchcock Presents	Ellen Grant	Season 1 Episode 38: "The Creeper"
1956	The Last Hunt	Peg	
1956	Gunsmoke	Pearl Bender	Season 2 Episode 13: "Poor Pearl"
1957	The Iron Sheriff	Claire	
1957	Trackdown	Polly Webster	
1957	Bailout at 43,000	Mrs. Frances Nolan	
1957	The Phil Silvers Show	WAC Lieutenant Virginia Rogers	Season 2 Episode 30: "Bilko and the Marriage Broker"
1957	The Phil Silvers Show	Bonnie Morgan	Season 3 Episode 14: "Bilko and the Flying Saucers"
1958	Perry Mason	Helen Reed / Joyce Martel	Season 1 Episode 24: "The Deadly Double"
1959	A Summer Place	Helen Jorgenson	
1959	Bat Masterson	Gwen Parsons	Season 1 Episode 28: "Lottery of Death"
1960	Alfred Hitchcock Presents	Shasta Cooney	Season 6 Episode 7: "Outlaw in Town"
1960	Bat Masterson	Ivy Dickson	Season 2 Episode 27: "Stage to Nowhere"
1960	Home from the Hill	Opal Bixby	
1961	Claudelle Inglish	Jessie Inglish	
1961	87th Precinct	Virginia Colt	Season 1 Episode 2: "Lady In Waiting"
1962	Rome Adventure	Daisy Bronson	
1962	All Fall Down	Mrs. Mandel	
1962	Gunsmoke	Florida	Season 7 Episode 27: "Wagon Girls"
1962	House of Women	Sophie Brice	
1962	The Cabinet of Caligari	Christine	
1962	Shoot Out at Big Sag	Goldie Bartholomew	
1963	The Caretakers	Nurse Bracken	
1963	The Twilight Zone	Barbara Polk	Season 5 Episode 8: "Uncle Simon"
1963	Perry Mason	Frances Walden	Season 6 Episode 27: "The Case of the Potted Planter"
1963	Perry Mason	Sylvia Thompson	Season 7 Episode 2: "The Case of the Shifty Shoebox"
1966	Shane	Longhorn Jenny	Season 1 Episode 15: "The Great Invasion, Part 1"
1967–1992	Another World	Ada Lucas Hobson / Ada McGowan	2391 episodes
1974	99 and 44/100% Dead	Dolly	
