= Margarita Sierra =

American singer (1936–1963)

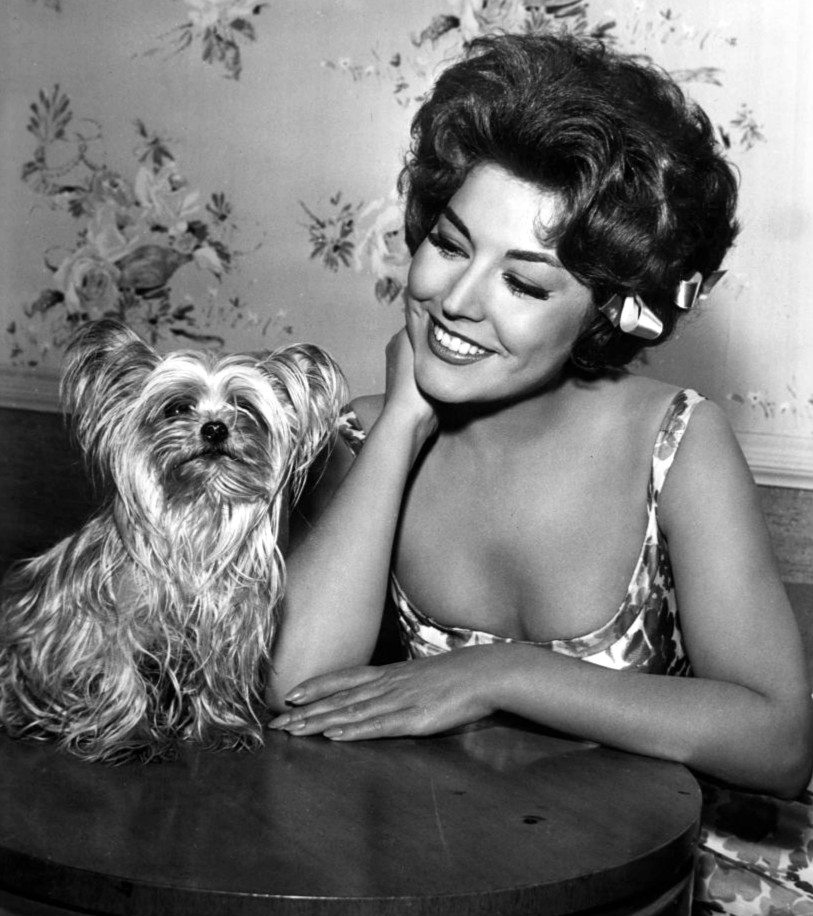
- Sierra in 1961
- Born: María Margarita Suárez Sierra; January 5, 1936; Madrid, Spain
- Died: September 6, 1963 (aged 27); Hollywood, California, U.S.
- Resting place: Holy Cross Cemetery
- Occupations: Actress; Live performer Dancer; Vocalist
- Years active: 1940–1963

María Margarita Suárez Sierra (January 5, 1936 – September 6, 1963), better known as Margarita Sierra, was a Spanish-American singer, dancer, and actress best known for her supporting role as the nightclub-singing Cha Cha O'Brien on the early 1960s ABC/Warner Bros. television series, Surfside 6, with Troy Donahue, Van Williams, Lee Patterson, and Diane McBain.

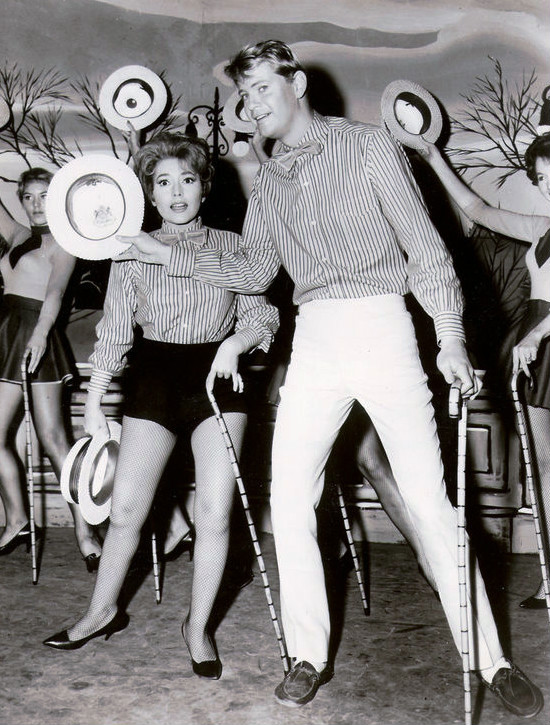
Sierra with Troy Donahue in Surfside 6

Episodes of Surfside 6 often featured Sierra singing, usually in English, but occasionally in Spanish. "The Cha Cha Twist", a song featured during the show's second and final season, was released as a single on Warner Bros. Records, but did not enter the Billboard Top 100 chart.

Sierra died in Hollywood, California, in 1963 at the age of 27, from complications following heart surgery performed a day earlier. She is interred at Holy Cross Cemetery in Culver City.

== Television ==
- 1957: Tonight Starring Jack Paar, guest appearance
- 1960–1962: Surfside 6, nightclub singer Cha Cha O'Brien
