= Surfside 6 =

American television program (1960–1962)

- Created by: William T. Orr and Hugh Benson
- Starring: Troy Donahue; Van Williams; Lee Patterson; Diane McBain; Margarita Sierra
- Theme music composer: Jerry Livingston and Mack David
- Country of origin: United States
- No. of seasons: 2
- No. of episodes: 74 (list of episodes)

Production
- Executive producer: William T. Orr
- Producers: Jerry Davis; Charles Hoffman; Ed Jurist; Joel Rogosin; Tom McKnight; Mack David; Gordon Bau (make-up)
- Production location: California
- Running time: 60 minutes
- Production company: Warner Bros. Television

Original release
- Network: ABC
- Release: October 6, 1960 – June 25, 1962

Related
- Bourbon Street Beat; 77 Sunset Strip, Hawaiian Eye

Surfside 6 is an ABC television series that aired from 1960 to 1962. The show centers on a Miami Beach detective agency set on a houseboat, and features Troy Donahue as Sandy Winfield II, Van Williams as Kenny Madison (a character recycled from Bourbon Street Beat), and Lee Patterson as Dave Thorne. Diane McBain co-stars as socialite Daphne Dutton, whose yacht is berthed next to their houseboat. Spanish actress Margarita Sierra also plays a supporting role as Cha Cha O'Brien, an entertainer who works at the Boom Boom Room, a popular Miami Beach hangout at the Fontainebleau Hotel, directly across the street from Surfside 6.

Surfside 6 was, in fact, a real address in Miami Beach, where an unrelated houseboat was moored at the time; it can also be seen in the sweeping aerial establishing shot of the Fontainebleau in 1964's Goldfinger.

== Description ==
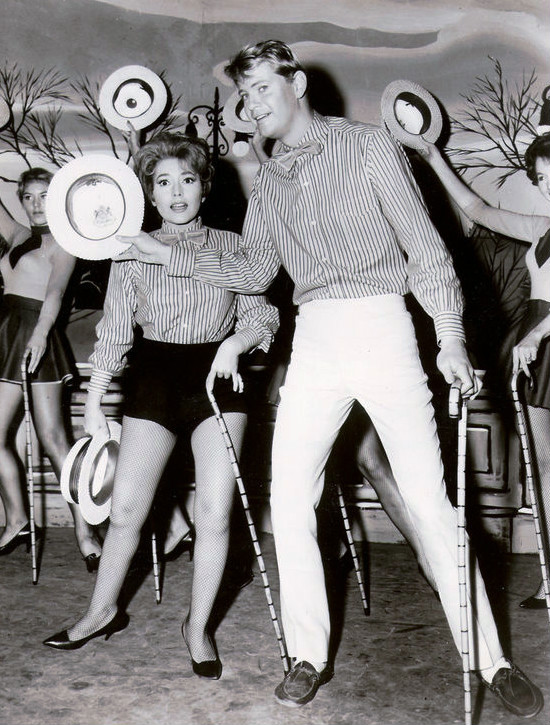
Cha Cha (Margarita Sierra) and Sandy (Troy Donahue) work on a dance routine.

Surfside 6 was one of four detective TV series produced by Warner Bros. around that time, the others being 77 Sunset Strip (set in Los Angeles), Hawaiian Eye (set in Hawaii), and the aforementioned Bourbon Street Beat (set in New Orleans). Plots, scripts (changing the names and locales), characters, and almost everything else crossed over from one series to another, not a difficult feat since they were all actually shot on the studio's backlots in Los Angeles.

Surfside 6's memorable theme song, written by Jerry Livingston and Mack David, has often been parodied in popular culture. The lyrics have many variations for each episode,, but "Surfside 6" and "In Miami Beach!" stay intact. When the women are introduced, the melody picks up with back-up singers singing "Cha Cha Cha" when the announcer introduces Margarita Sierra, who vamps exaggeratedly and winked at the camera during this brief weekly sequence.

In its first season, Surfside 6 was aired opposite the CBS sitcoms Bringing Up Buddy and The Danny Thomas Show and NBC's Western Tales of Wells Fargo starring Dale Robertson. In the second year, Surfside 6 competed against Danny Thomas and The Andy Griffith Show on CBS and NBC's short-lived, but highly acclaimed 87th Precinct starring Robert Lansing, a series about a fictitious New York City police precinct.

== Episodes ==
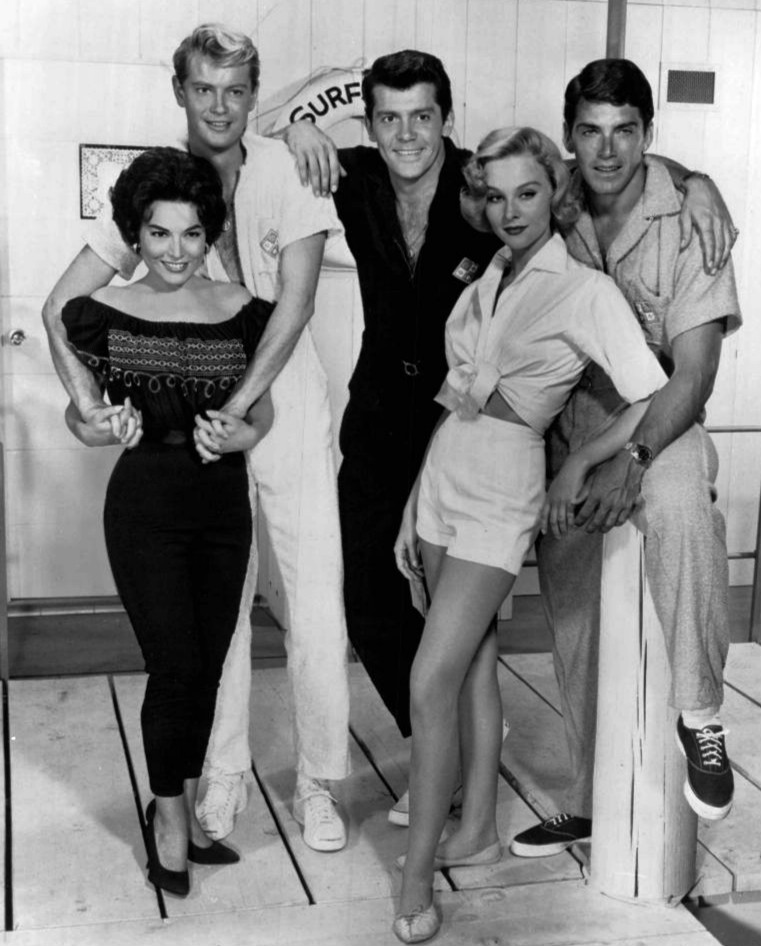
Surfside 6 cast: Margarita Sierra, Troy Donohue, Lee Patterson, Diane McBain, and Van Williams

== Cast and characters ==
- Troy Donahue as Sandy Winfield II moved to Miami to escape the shadow of his father, Jonathan Winfield I, who wanted him to be a Wall Street attorney. His father pays for Sandy's room and board at the Racquet Club in Miami Beach. At first, Sandy was not part of the firm, but he was friends with Kenny and Dave and he eventually joined their business.
- Van Williams as Kenny Madison, who graduated from law school and worked as a private investigator in New Orleans, in Bourbon Street Beat. He then moved to Miami.
- Lee Patterson as Dave Thorne, who served in the Air Force in the Korean War and worked in the New York District Attorney's office before moving to Miami.
- Diane McBain as Daphne Dutton, a socialite who has the berth next to the Surfside houseboat for her yacht, the Daffy II.
- Margarita Sierra as Cha Cha O'Brien, a featured performer at the Boom Boom Room, across the road from where the boys live.
- Mousie Garner as Mousie

== Background ==
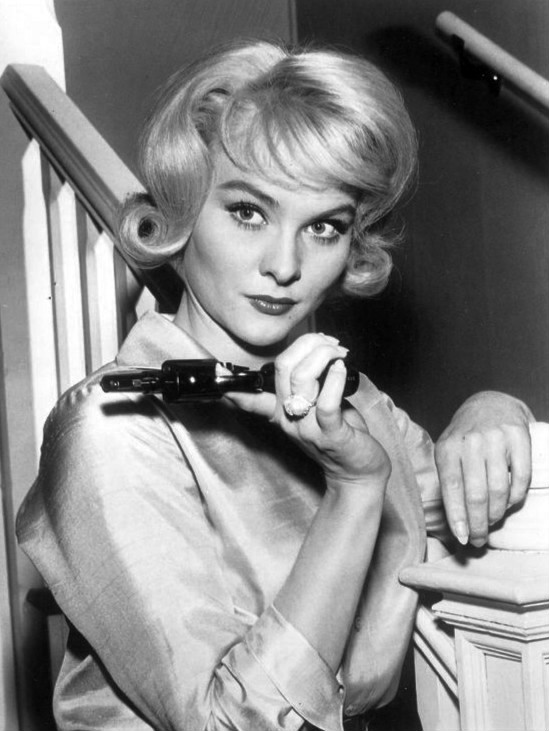
Diane McBain in the series

The series was announced in April 1960 as a replacement for Bourbon Street Beat. One paper described it as like "replacing a violin with a fiddle". It was given a Monday-night slot at 8:30.

== Reception ==
According to one critic, Surfside 6 "was one of TV's weakest shows; for the most part it was poorly written and not exactly endorsed by the Actors Studio, but the teenagers loved it." The Los Angeles Times called it "inept".

The show managed to be renewed for a second season. By April 1962, the show was cancelled.

== Follow-up ==
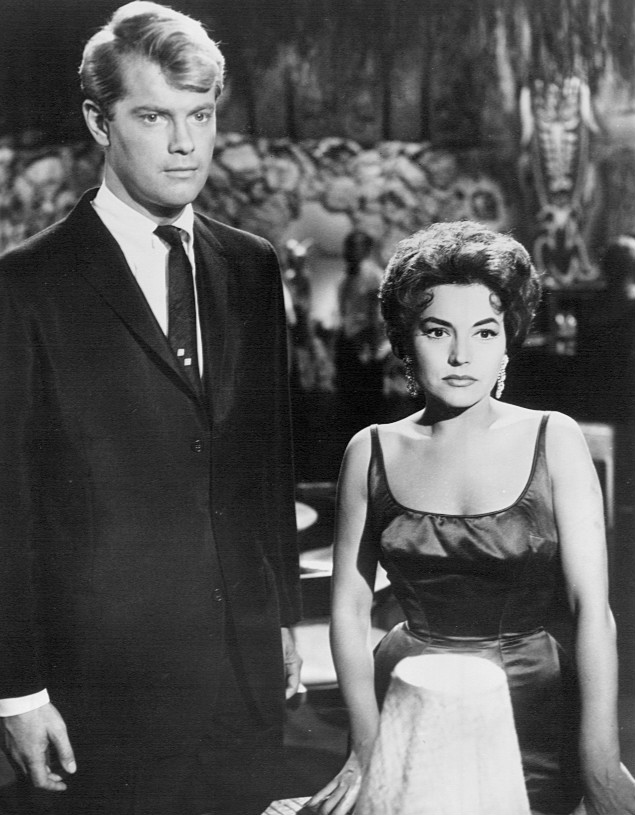
Donahue and Sierra

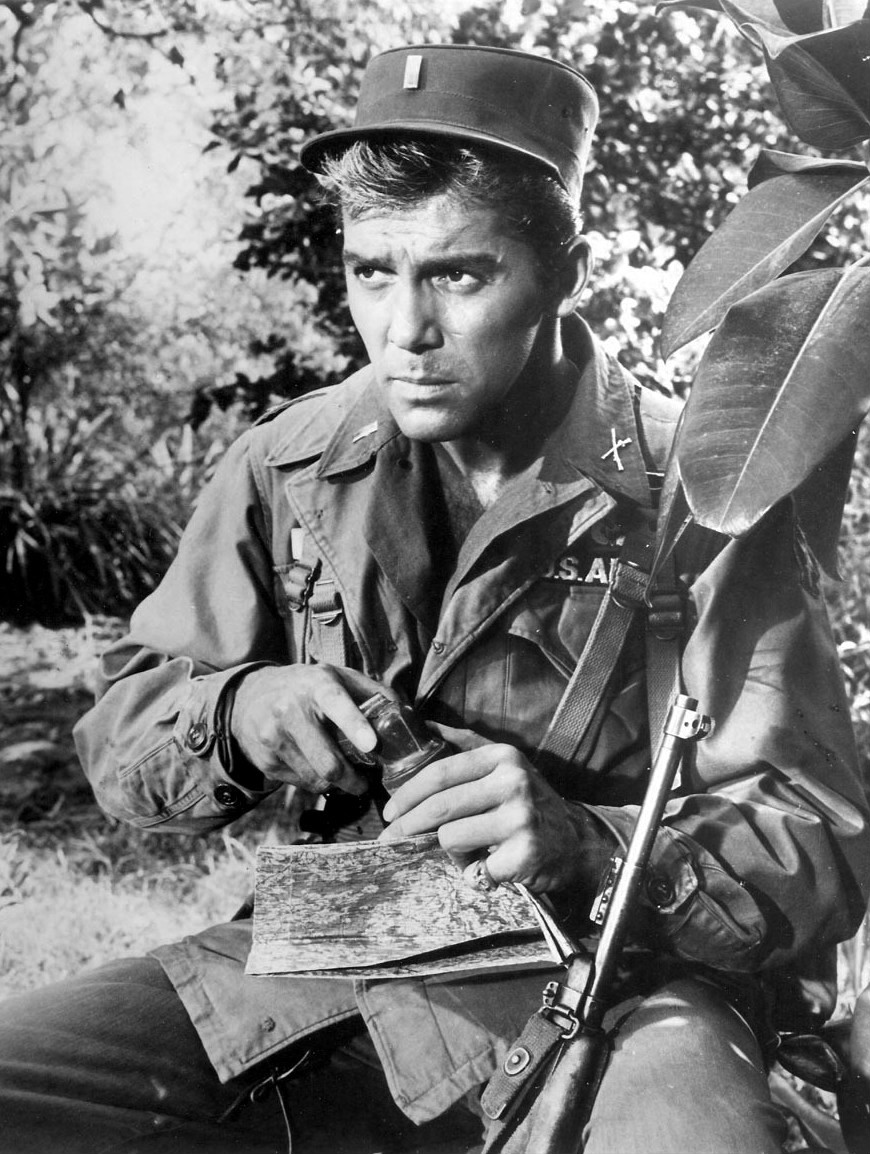
Lee Patterson in a 1962 episode

After the show was cancelled, Troy Donahue moved over to the cast of Hawaiian Eye to replace Anthony Eisley. Donahue played hotel social director Philip Barton.

Also, a book was released, Surfside 6 by Jay Flynn (US, Dell 8388, October 1962).

Margaret Sierra died in 1963 of a congenital heart condition.

Four years later, in 1966, Van Williams went on to his own short-lived TV series (which later became a cult classic), The Green Hornet, which co-starred Bruce Lee.

The houseboat was damaged in 1964, when Hurricane Cleo hit Miami.
