= Rome Adventure =

1962 film by Delmer Daves

- Theatrical release poster
- Directed by: Delmer Daves
- Screenplay by: Delmer Daves
- Based on: Lovers Must Learn; 1932 novel by Irving Fineman
- Produced by: Delmer Daves
- Starring: Troy Donahue; Angie Dickinson; Rossano Brazzi; Suzanne Pleshette; Constance Ford; Hampton Fancher; Al Hirt
- Cinematography: Charles Lawton Jr.
- Edited by: William H. Ziegler
- Music by: Max Steiner
- Distributed by: Warner Bros. Pictures
- Release date: March 5, 1962 (United States)
- Running time: 119 minutes
- Country: United States
- Language: English

Rome Adventure, also known as Lovers Must Learn, is a 1962 American romantic drama film, based on the 1932 novel Lovers Must Learn by Irving Fineman. It stars Troy Donahue, Angie Dickinson, and Suzanne Pleshette, and was directed by Delmer Daves.

== Plot ==
After quitting her job as a school librarian, Prudence Bell (Suzanne Pleshette) leaves New England for a vacation in Rome. On the ship over, she befriends Roberto Orlandi (Rossano Brazzi), a philandering middle-aged Italian. Upon their arrival in Rome, he introduces her to a countess who rents rooms in her villa to tourists. After finding employment at an American bookstore, Prudence encounters architectural student Don Porter (Troy Donahue), one of several Americans also rooming at the villa. Don is recovering from a failed relationship with a blonde temptress, Lyda (Angie Dickinson). Thus he keeps his distance at first. But he slowly sees Prudence as a refreshing curiosity with her adventurous outlook on life.

Weeks later, Don and Prudence tour the garden spots of northern Italy. But upon their return to Rome, Lyda appears, seeking to insinuate herself as Don's lover and puppeteer. She has become embroiled in what she claims is an abusive relationship with a cruel, possessive tycoon. It is obvious Lyda wants to rekindle her affair with Don. One evening, during dinner, she trades insults with Prudence. Three days later, having not heard from Don, Prudence assumes Lyda has won him back. She decides to move on. She consents to sex with Roberto, the aggressive Italian she met on the boat over. But Roberto, a friend of Don, reveals that Don had stayed with him (and not Lyda) to think matters through. Don had told Roberto of his love for Prudence. But he then received an urgent telegram from Lyda, summoning him to a hotel ion the same lake in northern Italy he and Prudence had spent their idyllic time together. After hearing this, Prudence makes plans for her return to America, and leaves for the liner home.

When Don arrives at the hotel, Lyda confesses she married for money and position only. She begs Don to help free her from her palatial prison. Finally realizing Lyda plans to use him only for her selfish ends again, Don bolts for Rome. But on his arrival, he discovers Prudence has taken a ship back to the States.

Days later, arriving in New York City, Prudence finds Don there at the dockside to greet her. They embrace, and in front of her parents, he tells her of his love and asks her to marry him.

== Cast ==
- Troy Donahue as Don Porter
- Angie Dickinson as Lyda Kent
- Rossano Brazzi as Roberto Orlandi
- Suzanne Pleshette as Prudence Bell
- Constance Ford as Daisy Bronson
- Al Hirt as himself
- Hampton Fancher as Albert Stillwell
- Iphigenie Castiglioni as La Contessa
- Chad Everett as Young man
- Gertrude Flynn as Mrs. Riggs
- Pamela Austin as Agnes Hutton
- Lili Valenty as Angelina
- Emilio Pericoli as Italian Nightclub Singer

== Production ==
Lovers Must Learn was published in 1932. The New York Times called it a "workmanlike production". Unlike the film, the novel was set in Paris.

Delmer Daves purchased the rights to the novel in 1957 and announced plans to make a film version in France, Copenhagen and Switzerland.

Natalie Wood was at one stage announced for the lead. Troy Donahue was announced for the male lead relatively early. Eventually Wood dropped out and Suzanne Pleshette was signed in September 1961.

The film was known during production as Lovers Must Learn. Donahue and Pleshette fell in love while filming, and eventually wed, though the marriage lasted less than a year.

The song "Al di là" featured in the film and performed by Emilio Pericoli, was originally recorded by Betty Curtis and Luciano Tajoli and winner of the 1961 edition of the Sanremo Festival, subsequently becoming Italy's entry to the Eurovision Song Contest 1961. The song became an international hit with a cover version by Connie Francis.

Most of the interior scenes were shot at Warner Bros. Studios Burbank. The Library and Port of Entry sets were originally constructed for the film The Music Man (1962).

== Soundtrack ==
1. "Rome Adventure"
2. "Lovers Must Learn"
3. "Tarantella"
4. "Al Di La"
5. "Serenade"
6. "Prudence"
7. "Rome Adeventure"
8. "Oh Marie"
9. "Mattinata"
10. "Arrivederci Roma"
11. "Come Back to Sorrento"
12. "Santa Lucia"
13. "Volare"

== See also ==
- List of American films of 1962
