= Sweet Savior =

- Directed by: Robert L. Roberts
- Written by: Willie Gilbert (as Matt Cavanaugh)
- Produced by: Robert L. Roberts
- Starring: Troy Donahue
- Cinematography: Victor Petroshevitz
- Edited by: John Connoll
- Music by: Jeff Barry; Gilbert Splacin
- Distributed by: Trans World Attractions (original release); Troma Entertainment
- Release date: 1971
- Running time: 92 mins
- Country: United States
- Language: English

Sweet Savior is a 1971 film directed by Robert L. Roberts (credited as "Bob Roberts"), written by Willie Gilbert (under the pseudonym "Matt Cavanaugh"), and starring Troy Donahue as a Charles Manson-type cult leader.

It was also known as The Idiotic Couple and Frenetic Party, and ultimately released on video by Troma Entertainment as The Love-Thrill Murders.

== Production ==
Lloyd Kaufman was the production manager.

Troy Donahue said while promoting the film:

I play Moon, a religious creep who murders a lot of people, a real heavy trip. But I don't want anyone to think I'm playing it in some phony exploitation flick that takes advantage of the Manson case to make a fast buck. I don't like many things, man, but I dig this picture... We're trying to show both sides of the problem. The Hollywood glamor society is as guilty as the depraved hippy cults. They pick up people on the Sunset Boulevard and tease them. When they made fun of Manson they picked on the wrong guy. I was up at the Tate house. It was a freaky scene. Sure I met Manson at the beach playing volleyball.

Director Bob Roberts said:

I had the idea not to make the Mason story per se but to inform people the Sharon Tate thing was not just an isolated incident. Many other cults are murdering people. They're just not as publicised. There are a lot of so-called families like Mason's with one dictatorial leader who controls his group through drugs, pills, sex, LSD and many other ways. These people are a threat to the fabric of society because they commit murder without conscience.

"This is going to be a very big picture," said Donahue. "I have a feeling it's going to be bigger than Love Story."

== Censorship ==
In France, under the title "La Secte qui tue" ("The cult which kills"), the movie was refused a certificate in 1979 by the Control Board.

== See also ==
- List of American films of 1971
