= The Golden Disc =

1958 British film by Don Sharp

- US Poster under the title The In-Between Age
- Directed by: Don Sharp
- Written by: Don Sharp; Don Nicholl
- Based on: story by Gee Nicholl
- Produced by: W. G. Chalmers
- Starring: Mary Steele; Lee Patterson; Terry Dene
- Production company: Butchers Film Productions
- Distributed by: Butchers Film Distributors
- Release date: 3 August 1958
- Running time: 78 minutes
- Country: United Kingdom
- Language: English

The Golden Disc (also known as The In-Between Age) is a 1958 British pop musical film directed by Don Sharp, starring Terry Dene and Mary Steele. It was written by Sharp and Don Nicholl based on a story by Gee Nicholl. A young man and a young woman open a trendy coffee bar and discover a singing star.

== Plot ==
Joan Farmer, with the help of her friend Harry Blair, persuades her aunt to turn her worn-out cafe into a trendy espresso bar for teenagers. The opening of the bar allowed the discovery of a singing star, Terry Dene. Later on, the coffee bar was transformed into a recording company. After various adventures, Terry sells a million records in America, and Joan and Harry fall in love.

== Cast ==
- Lee Patterson as Harry Blair
- Mary Steele as Joan Farmer
- Terry Dene as himself
- Linda Gray as Aunt Sarah
- Ronald Adam as Mr. Dryden
- Peter Dyneley as Mr. Washington
- David Jacobs as himself
- Richard Turner as morose man
- Marianne Stone as Dryden's secretary
- Olive Milbourn as Mrs Simpson
- Redmond Phillips as 1st recording engineer
- Dennis Lotis as himself
- Nancy Whiskey as herself
- Hobeaux as themselves
- Murray Campbell as himself
- Sheila Buxton as herself
- Phil Seamen Jazz Group as themselves
- Sonny Stewart & his Skiffle Kings as themselves
- Terry Kennedy Group as themselves

== Production ==
The film was shot at Walton Studios. It was a vehicle for Terry Dene who had three top twenty hits in Britain.

It was one of several British pop films set around coffee bars, others including The Tommy Steele Story, Serious Charge, Beat Girl and Expresso Bongo. Director Don Sharp said it was made at a time when "everybody was making a musical". His wife Mary played the female lead.

Filming started on 23 September 1957. Jack Phillips of Butchers Film Productions, who made the film, claimed the film was "not an imitation of The Tommy Steele Story or anything like this" even though it was a musical vehicle for a pop star.

== Songs ==
- "I'm Gonna Wrap You Up" (Ray Mack, Philip Green) performed by Dennis Lotis
- "Before We Say Goodnight" (Norman Newell, Philip Green) performed by Mary Steele
- "Dynamo" (Tommy Connor) performed by Les Hobeaux Skiffle Group
- "C'min and be Loved" (Len Paverman) performed by Terry Dene
- "Charm" (Ray Mack, Philip Green) performed by Terry Dene
- "The In-between Age" (Ray Mack, Philip Green) performed by Sheila Buxton
- "Let Me Lie" (Sonny & Stewart) performed by Sonny Stewart and his Skiffle Kings
- "Candy Floss" ( Len Paverman) performed by Terry Dene
- "Lower Deck" (Phil Seamen) performed by Phil Seamen Jazz Group
- "Balmoral Melody" (Philip Green) performed by Murray Campbell
- "Johnny O" (Len Praverman) performed by Nancy Whiskey and Sonny Stewart and his Skiffle Kings
- "The Golden Age" (Michael Robbins, Richard Dix) performed by Terry Dene.

== Reception ==
=== Box office ===
The film was not a success at the box office, a factor which was thought to have contributed to Dene showing symptoms of unstable behaviour.

=== Critical reception ===
In a 1958 review The Monthly Film Bulletin wrote: "Rock'n'roll music 1s loud and exnibitionist; its exponents usually noisy, vital, eccentric, often larger than life. With an immense following both here and in the States, this interesting phenomenon deserves a more full-blooded investigation or exposition than The Golden Disc manages. In fact the performances which the film wraps in its somewhat vapid plot are all genteel and disappointingly inhibited."

In the same year Variety wrote: "The pic would have been more acceptable had the screenplay by Don Nicholl and Don Sharp not been completely devoid of wit and suspense, and also had Sharp's direction not been so ploding."

Picturegoer wrote: "One thing is certain: Terry Dene's no actor. His non-slnging scenes are kept to a minimum in the film that's supposed to do for him what The Tommy Steele Story did for that other South London rock 'n roller. He says practically nothing, but naturally sings quite a bit – which theoretically is what will sell the picture at the box office. Will it? Certainly the story won't. ... There are some clever, talented touches and twenty-four carat performances come from Patterson and Mary Steele – better than The Golden Disc really deserves."

The Radio Times Guide to Films (2017) gave the film 1/5 stars, writing: "The coffee bar was the only place to be seen in the early rock 'n' roll years, but it is almost impossible to see how they became teen meccas from this risible British pop picture. In the very worst "it's trad, dad" manner, it shows how Lee Patterson and Mary Steele jazz up her aunt's coffee shop with a record booth and the singing talents of odd-jobman Terry Dene. "

In British Sound Films: The Studio Years 1928–1959 David Quinlan rated the film as "mediocre", writing: "Halting pop musical with a lot of inhibited acting."

== Home media ==
It was re-released on DVD by Renown Pictures Ltd in 2010.
