= The Key Man (1957 film) =

1957 British film by Montgomery Tully

- Theatrical release poster
- Directed by: Montgomery Tully
- Written by: J. MacLaren Ross
- Produced by: Alec C. Snowden
- Starring: Lee Patterson; Hy Hazell; Colin Gordon
- Cinematography: Phil Grindrod
- Production company: Insignia Films
- Distributed by: Anglo Amalgamated Film Distributors
- Release date: July 1957
- Running time: 63 minutes
- Country: United Kingdom
- Language: English

The Key Man (U.S. title: Life at Stake) is a 1957 British black and white second feature directed by Montgomery Tully and starring Lee Patterson, Paula Byrne and Colin Gordon. The screenplay was by Julian MacLaren-Ross adapted from his original story. The film was released in the USA by United Artists.

== Plot ==
Lionel Hulme is a radio reporter who is trying to trace both the man who committed a robbery 12 years ago as well as the proceeds of the robbery.

== Cast ==
- Lee Patterson as Lionel Hulme
- Paula Byrne as Pauline Hulme
- Colin Gordon as Larry Parr
- Hy Hazell as Gaby aka Eva Smithers
- Philip Leaver as Smithers
- Maudie Edwards as Mrs. Glass
- Harold Kasket as Mr Dimitriadi, the barber
- George Margo as Jeff
- Henri Vidon as Haddow (as Henry Vidon)
- Ian Wilson as process Server
- Dennis Castle as police inspector

== Production ==
The film was shot during a three week period in 1957 in response to an initiative by Anglo-Amalgamated to increase the number of British made B movies available. MacLaren-Ross had been persuaded by producer Alec C. Snowden to write a script in late 1956 and after some doubts about the project delivered a screenplay to Snowden in January 1957.

== Critical reception ==
Kinematograph Weekly called it "a darned good British programmer."

The Monthly Film Bulletin described the film as "...indistinguishable from numerous others of its type; the plot and development are very slight; and the characters negative" with an overall rating of poor.

In British Sound Films: The Studio Years 1928–1959 David Quinlan rated the film as "mediocre", writing: "Brisk but very ordinary thriller."

== Radio adaptation ==
The story was adapted as a radio play and broadcast on the BBC Home Service in August 1960.
