= Van Williams =

American actor (1934–2016)

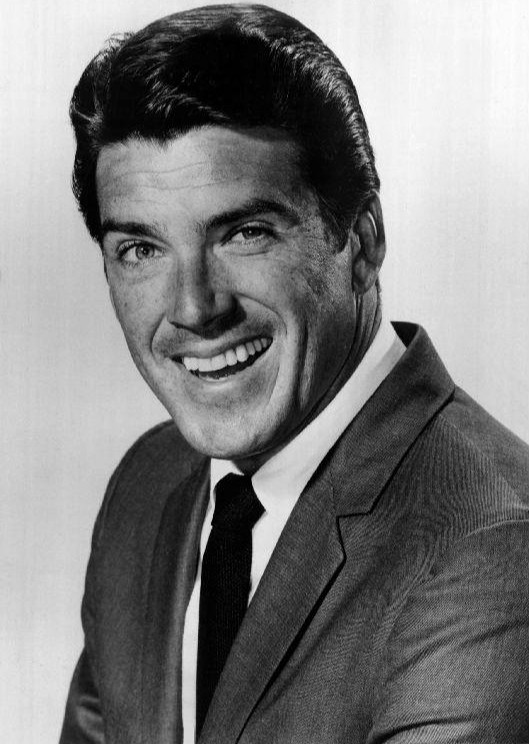
- Williams as Britt Reid in The Green Hornet (1966).
- Born: Van Zandt Jarvis Williams; February 27, 1934; Fort Worth, Texas, U.S.
- Died: November 28, 2016 (aged 82); Scottsdale, Arizona, U.S.
- Occupation: Actor
- Years active: 1954–1993
- Spouses: Drucilla Greenhaw (m. 1953; div. 1956) Vicki Flaxman (m. 1959)
- Children: 5

Van Zandt Jarvis Williams (February 27, 1934 – November 28, 2016) was an American actor best known for his leading role as Kenny Madison in both Warner Bros. television detective series Bourbon Street Beat (1959–1960) and its sequel, Surfside 6 (1960–1962). For one season, he starred as the title character in the television series The Green Hornet, with Bruce Lee as his partner Kato. It was broadcast during the 1966–1967 season.

== Early life ==
Williams grew up on a ranch outside Fort Worth and later studied animal husbandry and business at Texas Christian University. He and the famous singer/songwriter Townes Van Zandt were cousins. He moved to Hawaii in 1956 after differences with his father on how the ranch should be run.

== Career ==
A diving instructor in Hawaii in 1956, Williams was discovered there in 1957 by producer Mike Todd, who urged him to come to Hollywood. Williams recalled, "Todd liked the look of me and said I should try the acting business, but added, 'First, boy, go back to college and get your degree.' I followed his advice, took my degree in business administration and then wandered into Hollywood."

Todd died in a plane crash in 1958, but Williams took voice and acting lessons. He managed to get cast in an episode of General Electric Theatre and was seen by executives from Warner Bros., who signed him to a contract in 1959. "I stumbled into the business, unknown and untrained," he says. "I was really lucky."

=== Bourbon Street Beat ===
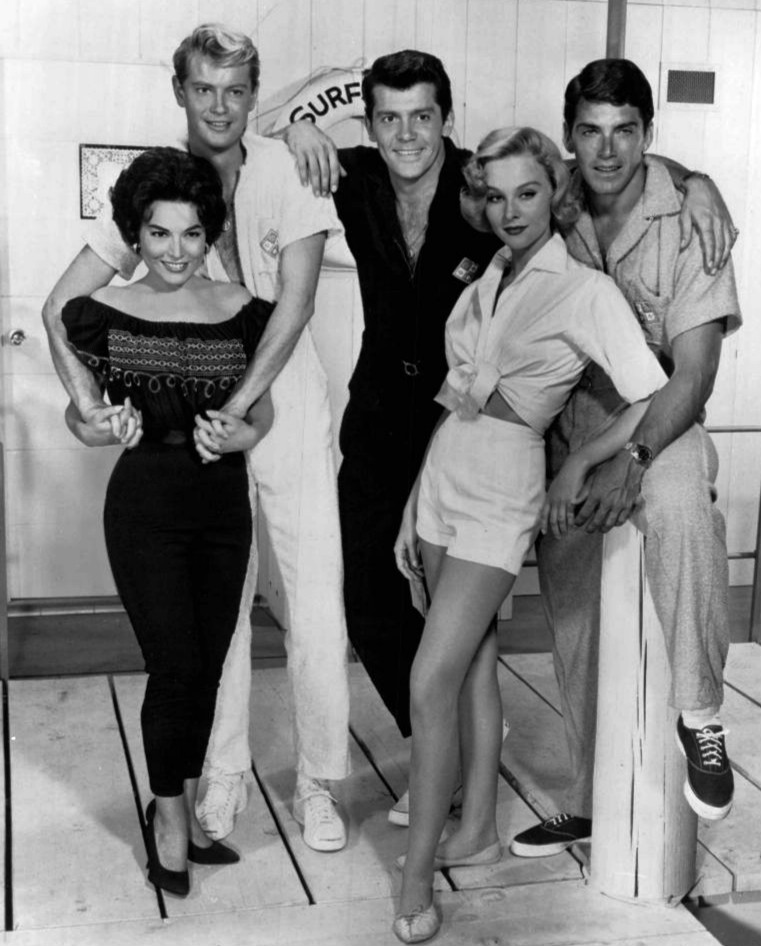
Margarita Sierra, Troy Donahue, Lee Patterson, Diane McBain and Williams in Surfside 6

Williams guest starred on episodes of General Electric Theater, Lawman, and Colt .45.

His big break came as co-star of the television series Bourbon Street Beat, which was set in New Orleans. The show aired during the 1959–1960 season; his co-stars were Andrew Duggan, Richard Long, and Arlene Howell.

Williams appeared in Tall Story (1960), in which he stepped naked out of the men's locker room shower in front of Jane Fonda's character and comically said "If it is alright with you, it is alright with me".

=== Surfside Six ===
Bourbon Street Beat was axed after one season, but Williams' character, Kenny Madison, was recycled into the new Surfside 6 television series in the same time slot, with Miami Beach colleagues played by Troy Donahue, Lee Patterson, Diane McBain, and Margarita Sierra. Williams received second billing after Donahue. The series lasted until 1962.

During the run of these series, Williams occasionally guest-starred on other Warners shows, such as Cheyenne, 77 Sunset Strip, and Hawaiian Eye. He appeared in a Warners anti-communist short, Red Nightmare (1962). Williams also starred in a World War II television pilot titled The Leathernecks that was shown as an episode of The Gallant Men.

He had a supporting role in The Caretakers (1963).

=== The Tycoon ===
After his Warner Brothers contract lapsed in 1964, Williams was cast as Pat Burns, series regular in The Tycoon with Walter Brennan. The show lasted one season.

He worked in television commercials and guest appearances on various television series such as The Dick Van Dyke Show, The Beverly Hillbillies, Preview Tonight, and The Milton Berle Show.

=== The Green Hornet ===
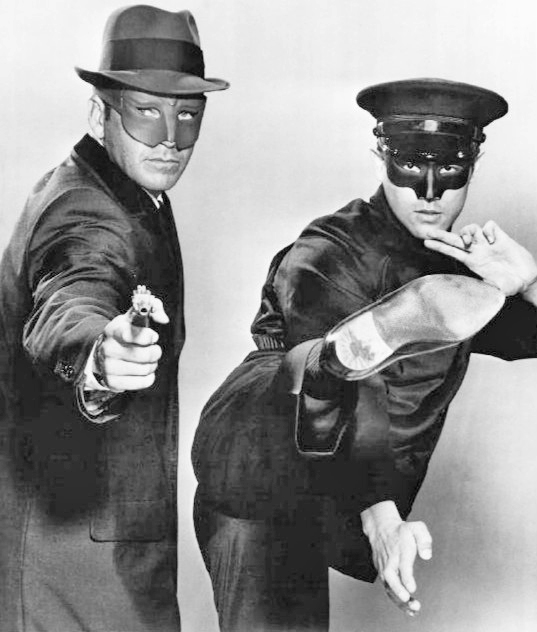
Van Williams and Bruce Lee in The Green Hornet

In 1966, ABC-TV had William Dozier revive George W. Trendle's famous radio character in a new series, The Green Hornet. Van Williams signed with 20th Century-Fox to portray the mysterious masked hero and his alter ego, newspaper editor Britt Reid (son of Dan Reid Jr. who was the nephew of John Reid, a.k.a. The Lone Ranger although The Lone Ranger was not given that as his official true identity name).

Williams played the role straight, unlike the comedy approach of the same producer's Batman show. He and co-star Bruce Lee also made three guest appearances, in character, on Batman, first in a "batclimb" cameo ("The Spell of Tut", 9/28/1966), and later in a two-part episode ("A Piece of the Action", 3/1/1967 and "Batman's Satisfaction", 3/2/1967).

By the time he starred in The Green Hornet, Williams had become successful investing in various commercial ventures; a TV Guide profile of 1966, titled "Banker with a Sting", characterized him as "your friendly neighborhood tycoon."

Williams later said "By the time The Green Hornet came along, I had pretty well decided to get out of the television business. About the only thing I enjoyed about those years was the location work. Basically I'm a shy person. I know that public appearances and autographs and all that are a necessary part of the business, but it wasn't for me."

=== Later career and retirement ===
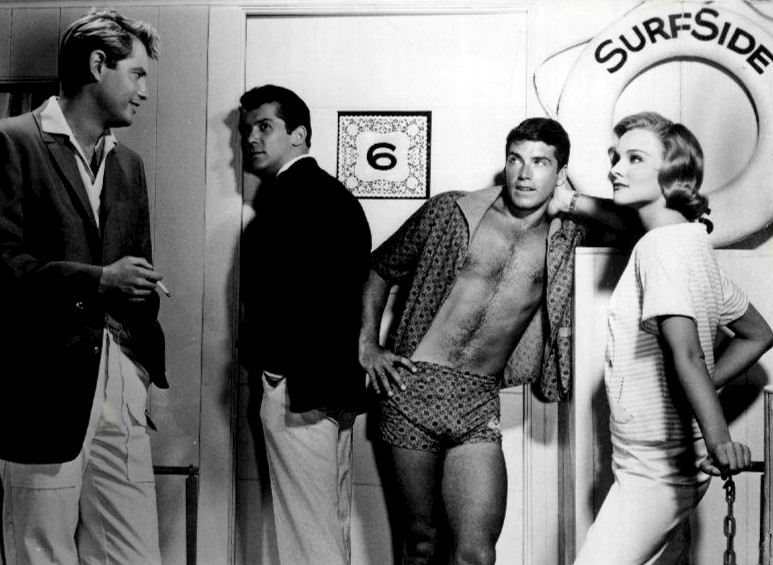
Surfside 6 cast: Troy Donahue, Lee Patterson, Van Williams and Diane McBain

After The Green Hornet ended, Williams guest starred on shows such as The Big Valley, Mannix, Love, American Style, Nanny and the Professor, Ironside, Mission: Impossible, Apple's Way, Gunsmoke, and The Manhunter.

Williams returned to the lead in a regular series with Westwind (1975), a children's adventure series.

He was in a TV movie, The Runaways (1975), and guest-starred on Bert D'Angelo/Superstar, The Red Hand Gang , Barnaby Jones, A Twist in the Tale, The Streets of San Francisco, How the West Was Won, Colorado C.I., Centennial, The Night Rider, Mrs. Columbo and The Rockford Files.

In 1981, he turned down the offer of a role in Falcon Crest, because it involved too much location shooting. Williams retired from acting in 1982 to open a communications company in Santa Monica, California that leases time on six two-way radio repeater stations. He was also a longtime reserve deputy sheriff with the Los Angeles County Sheriff's Department and worked at the substation in Malibu, California.

In 1993, Williams made a cameo in Dragon: The Bruce Lee Story as the director of The Green Hornet television program.

In 2010, the filmmakers of the 2011 Green Hornet film adaptation had wanted him to make a cameo appearance as a cemetery guard, but Williams turned it down.

Williams stated he did not care much for acting, citing some reasons being his resentment toward the people in the industry and their unfair method of going about things. He was also wary of typecasting, pointing to examples of failures it caused in people's acting careers, such as the case of George Reeves when he became too affiliated with his portrayal of Superman. This also became one of his concerns when playing The Green Hornet. Another concern was its strong similarity to Batman, but he claimed that because William Morris, his agent, wanted him to do it, he did it. He also stated that his only interest in acting was taking it up as a business rather than to gain celebrity status.

== Personal life and death ==
Williams married Vicki Flaxman in 1959. Together they had two children, and one from Vicki's prior marriage to Jeff Richards. He had nine grandchildren. He had twin daughters from a previous marriage to Drucilla Greenhaw, which also included four grandchildren. In 1988, Williams owned houses in Sun Valley, Idaho, Fort Worth (which included a ranch he inherited from his parents), and Hawaii. He said it was the fruits of good investments. Pat Priest (The Munsters), Williams's longtime friend and neighbor, said he was her mentor.

Outside his acting career, Williams was also closely affiliated with co-star Adam West. The two of them were neighbors in Sun Valley and spent much leisure time together. West also claimed when people saw them together outdoors, they would comment about Batman and The Green Hornet being on a secret case together. Producer Kevin Burns revealed on December 5, 2016, that Williams died on November 28, 2016, from kidney failure at the age of 82 in Scottsdale, Arizona.

== Filmography ==
=== Film ===
| Year | Title | Role | Notes |
|---|---|---|---|
| 1960 | Tall Story | Young Man in Shower | Uncredited |
| 1962 | Red Nightmare | Air Force Sergeant | Short film / Uncredited |
| 1963 | The Caretakers | Dr. Larry Denning | |
| 1966 | Our Man Flint | President Lyndon B. Johnson (voice) | Uncredited |
| 1966 | Batman | President Lyndon B. Johnson (voice) | Uncredited |
| 1993 | Dragon: The Bruce Lee Story | Green Hornet Director | |

=== Television ===
| Year | Title | Role | Notes |
|---|---|---|---|
| 1954 | King Richard II | Exton's Servant | Television film |
| 1958–1959 | General Electric Theater | Charlie / Ben | 2 episodes |
| 1959 | Lawman | Zachary Morgan | Episode: "The Young Toughs" |
| 1959 | Colt .45 | Tom Rucker | Episode: "The Sanctuary" |
| 1959–1960 | Bourbon Street Beat | Kenny Madison | 36 episodes |
| 1960–1962 | Surfside 6 | Ken Madison | 69 episodes |
| 1961–1963 | 77 Sunset Strip | Wade Saunders / Ken Madison | 2 episodes |
| 1962 | Cheyenne | Ray Masters | Episode: "Vengeance Is Mine" |
| 1963 | The Gallant Men | Lt. Dave Cameron | Episode: "The Leathernecks" |
| 1963 | Hawaiian Eye | Don Munroe | Episode: "Two Million Too Much" |
| 1964 | Temple Houston | Joey Baker | Episode: "Ten Rounds for Baby" |
| 1964–1965 | The Tycoon | Pat Burns | 32 episodes |
| 1965 | The Dick Van Dyke Show | Clark Rice | Episode: "No Rice at My Wedding" |
| 1965 | The Beverly Hillbillies | Dean Peters | Episode: "The Courtship of Elly" |
| 1966 | Preview Tonight | Commander Russ Enright | Episode: "Pursue and Destroy" |
| 1966 | The Milton Berle Show | The Green Hornet / Britt Reid | Episode: #1.2 |
| 1966–1967 | The Green Hornet | The Green Hornet / Britt Reid | 26 episodes |
| 1966–1967 | Batman | The Green Hornet / Britt Reid | 3 episodes |
| 1968 | The Big Valley | Sheriff Dave Barrett | Episode: "Rimfire" |
| 1970 | Mannix | Executive #1 | Episode: "The Search for Darrell Andrews" |
| 1970 | Love, American Style | Bill | Segment: "Love and the Minister" |
| 1970 | Nanny and the Professor | Mr. Parsons | Episode: "The Visitor" |
| 1971 | Ironside | Sgt. Artie Hawkins | Episode: "The Gambling Game" |
| 1972 | Mission: Impossible | Arnold Sanders | Episode: "The Deal" |
| 1974 | Apple's Way | Ritchie Case | Episode: "The Lamb" |
| 1974 | Gunsmoke | Quincy | Episode: "Thirty a Month and Found" |
| 1975 | The Manhunter | | Episode: "To Kill a Tiger" |
| 1975 | The Runaways | Joe Ringer | Television film |
| 1975 | Westwind | Steve Andrews | 13 episodes |
| 1976 | Bert D'Angelo/Superstar | Junior Danvers | Episode: "Scag" |
| 1976 | The Streets of San Francisco | Officer Morton | 2 episodes |
| 1977 | Quinn Martin's Tales of the Unexpected | Sheriff | Episode: "Devil Pack" |
| 1977 | Barnaby Jones | Munson | Episode: "Circle of Treachery" |
| 1977 | The Red Hand Gang | OK Okins | 4 episodes |
| 1977 | You Gotta Start Somewhere | | Television film |
| 1978 | How the West Was Won | Captain MacAllister | 3 episodes |
| 1978 | Colorado C.I. | Captain Cochran | Television film |
| 1979 | Centennial | George | Episode: "The Scream of Eagles" |
| 1979 | The Night Rider | Jim Hollister | Television film |
| 1979 | Mrs. Columbo | Fielding | Episode: "The Valley Strangler" |
| 1979 | The Rockford Files | Lt. Dwayne Kefir | Episode: "Love Is the Word" |
