= Lee Patterson =

Canadian actor (1929–2007)

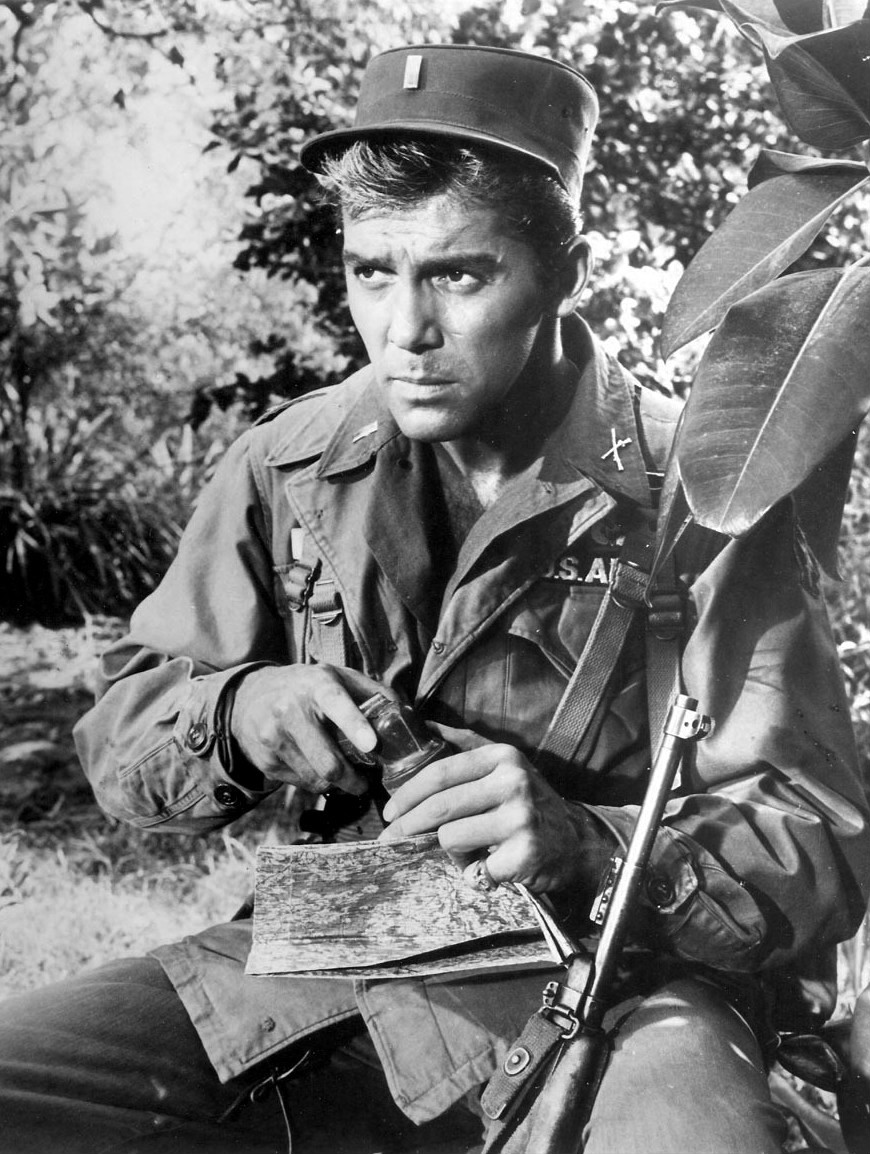
- Patterson as Dave Thorne in Surfside 6 (1962)
- Born: March 31, 1929
- Died: February 14, 2007 (aged 77); Galveston, Texas, U.S.
- Occupation: Actor
- Years active: 1953–1994

Lee Patterson (March 31, 1929 – February 14, 2007) was a Canadian film and television actor.

== British career ==
He moved to the UK, where he specialised in playing virile American types in British films. He appeared in a number of films during the 1950s and 1960s, including The Good Die Young (1954), Above Us the Waves (1955), Reach for the Sky (1956), The Key Man (1957), Time Lock (1957) The Golden Disc (1958), Cat & Mouse (1958), Jack the Ripper (1959) and The 3 Worlds of Gulliver (1960). He left but returned to the UK to appear as hard-bitten navigation expert Captain Randolph Southard in the play version of The Caine Mutiny Court Martial at The Queen's Theatre, London, directed by Charlton Heston in 1985.

== American TV ==
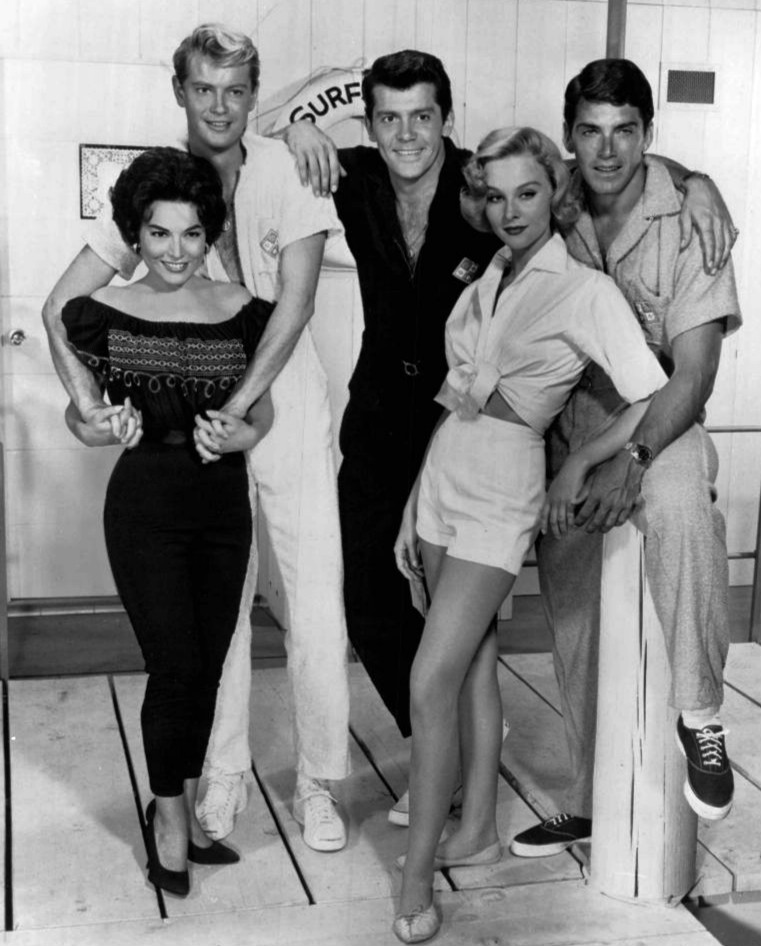
Surfside 6 cast: Margarita Sierra, Troy Donohue, Patterson, Diane McBain and Van Williams

After moving to the USA in the early 1960s, Patterson worked mainly in television. In 1960, he was cast in two episodes of the ABC/Warner Brothers western television series The Alaskans, starring Roger Moore. Patterson played Tom Kirk in the episode "Behind the Moon" and Jeff Warren in "Sign of the Kodiak", a reference to the Kodiak bear. Later that year, he was cast as the fictional detective Dave Thorne in another ABC/WB series, Surfside 6, set on a houseboat anchored at Miami Beach, Florida, which co-starred Van Williams, Troy Donahue, Diane McBain and Margarita Sierra.

He also appeared in 1965 on the fourth season of Combat! as an O.S.S Officer, Captain Howard in the episode "9 Place Vendee".

Early in 1966, Patterson appeared as Dan Thorne in the Perry Mason episode "The Case of the Midnight Howler".

== Later career ==
Patterson appeared in daytime serials prior to 1970. His first soap opera role was that of Brad Kiernan in ABC's The Nurses. After that show was cancelled in 1967, he joined the original cast of One Life to Live, a move that reunited him with Doris Quinlan, the producer of The Nurses.

Patterson remained in One Life to Live until 1970, when his character Joe Riley was presumed dead; he returned to the show in 1972 and remained the romantic lead until 1979, when he left due to his unhappiness with the direction the show took after Doris Quinlan left to produce NBC's troubled serial The Doctors.

Patterson then joined the cast of NBC's Another World and Texas in the role of Dr. Kevin Cooke. The character began in Another World, but moved to Texas when that show began on August 4, 1980. He stayed until 1981, when the show was revamped to bring up its poor ratings against the number-one daytime program, ABC's General Hospital. Texas was cancelled in 1982. Patterson returned to One Life to Live as Joe's twin brother, Tom Dennison, from 1986 until 1988.

He also continued to make appearances in other television shows such as War and Remembrance, Magnum, P.I. and The A-Team, and appeared in movies including Chato's Land (1972) and Airplane II: The Sequel (1982). His last role was as Sergeant Gaylor in the 1994 film Healer.

== Death ==
Patterson died in Galveston, Texas, of congestive heart failure with complications from lung cancer and emphysema, on 14 February 2007; he was aged 77. His death was not reported for nearly a year.

== Selected filmography ==
- Malta Story (1953) – Officer on Back of Truck (uncredited)
- Meet Mr Lucifer (1953) – American Sailor (uncredited)
- 36 Hours (U.S. title ' Terror Street') 1953) – Joe (uncredited)
- The Good Die Young (1954) – Tod Maslin
- Diamond Expert (1954)
- The Passing Stranger (1954) – Chick
- Above Us the Waves (1955) – Cox
- Faccia da mascalzone (1956)
- Soho Incident (aka Spin a Dark Web) (1956) – Jim Bankley
- Reach for the Sky (1956) – Turner
- Dry Rot (1956) – Danby
- Checkpoint (1956) – Johnny Carpenter
- The Counterfeit Plan (1957) – Duke
- The Key Man (1957) – Lionel Hulme
- The Story of Esther Costello (1957) – Harry Grant
- Time Lock (1957) – Colin Walker
- Natlogi betalt (1957) – Johnny Williams
- The Flying Scot (1957) – Ronnie
- The Golden Disc (1958) – Harry Blair
- The Spaniard's Curse (1958) – Mark Brett
- Man with a Gun (1958) – Mike Davies
- The Desperate Men (aka Cat & Mouse) (1958) – Rod Fenner
- Breakout (1959) – George Munro
- Jack the Ripper (1959) – Sam Lowry
- Deadly Record (1959) – Trevor Hamilton
- The White Trap (1959) – Paul Langley
- Third Man on the Mountain (1959) – Klaus Wesselhoft
- Please Turn Over (1959) – Rod, the Wrestler (uncredited)
- October Moth (1960) – Finlay
- The 3 Worlds of Gulliver (1960) – Reldresal
- The Ceremony (1963) – Nicky
- The Search for the Evil One (1967) – Becker
- Chato's Land (1972) – George Dunn
- Airplane II: The Sequel (1982) – Phoenix Six Captain
- Death Wish 3 (1985) – TV Newscaster
- Bullseye! (1990) – Darrell Hyde
- Healer (1994) – Sergeant Gaylor (final film role)
