= Troy Donahue =

American actor (1936–2001)

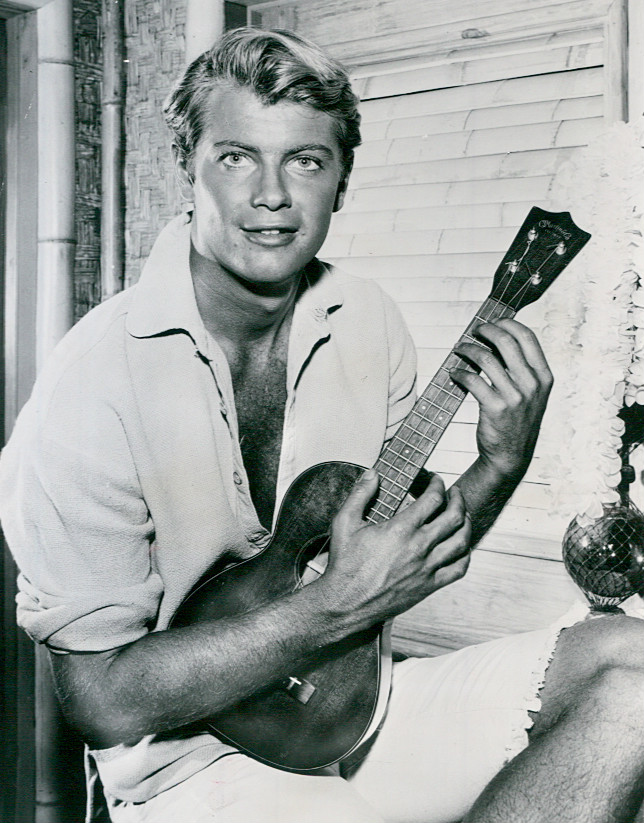
- Donahue in Hawaiian Eye, 1962
- Born: Merle Johnson Jr. January 27, 1936; New York City, U.S.
- Died: September 2, 2001 (aged 65); Santa Monica, California, U.S.
- Education: Columbia University
- Occupations: Actor; singer
- Years active: 1957–2000
- Spouses: Suzanne Pleshette (m. 1964; div. 1964); Valerie Allen (m. 1966; div. 1968); Alma Sharpe (m. 1969; div. 1972); Vicki Taylor (m. 1979; div. 1981)
- Partner(s): Zheng Cao (1991–Donahue's death 2001, engaged from 1999)
- Children: 2

Troy Donahue (born Merle Johnson Jr., January 27, 1936 – September 2, 2001) was an American film and television actor, best known for his role as Johnny Hunter in the film A Summer Place. He was a popular sex symbol in the late 1950s and early 1960s.

== Biography ==
=== Early years ===
Merle Johnson Jr., later known as Troy Donahue, was born on January 27, 1936, in New York General Hospital. His father was Frederick Merle Johnson, the Production Chief of promotional motion pictures of General Motors. His mother, Edith "Dede" Johnson (née Frederickson), was a Swedish retired stage actress. Donahue stated in a 1959 interview:

Acting is all I ever wanted. Ever since I can remember, I've studied and read plays. My mother would help me, but my parents didn't want me to become an actor. They preferred something more stable—doctor, lawyer, Indian chief, anything.

"I can remember always being exposed to Broadway and theater people", he added in 1984. "I can remember sitting with Gertrude Lawrence while she read her reviews in The King and I."

When he was six years old, he contracted pneumonia and was confined to bed for six weeks. Donahue's parents decided it would be better to move out of the city for his recovery. They purchased a five-acre estate in Middle Road, in Bayport, Suffolk County on Long Island. The family acquired a variety of farm animals. His sister, Eve, was born a year after the move.

Frederick was diagnosed with amyotrophic lateral sclerosis when Donahue was young. As his father's health declined over two years, Donahue began to exhibit behavior issues, including drinking alcohol in excess. On December 5, 1950, Frederick died in St. Alban's Hospital in New York City when Donahue was 14 years old. Following his death, Donahue's relationship with his mother became strained.

After Donahue dropped out of high school in his sophomore year, his mother enrolled him into the New York Military Academy, where he roomed with English actor Owen Orr. There he met Francis Ford Coppola after casting him in school plays. He was to attend West Point, but suffered a knee injury at a track meet, knocking it out of the joint and tearing the cartilage. The injury ruined the chance for a sports scholarship. He volunteered for the United States Army, but was rejected due to his permanently damaged knee.

After Donahue was left unable to participate in sports, he turned to writing and acting. He also wrote for the school paper, eventually ending up as the editor. He graduated from the academy in June 1954.

When Donahue was 18, he moved back to New York and got a job as a messenger for Sound Masters, a commercial film company that his father had founded. He attended Columbia University and studied journalism. He acted in summer stock in Bucks County and trained briefly with Ezra Stone, an American actor, director, and a family friend. During this time, Donahue had very little money and was evicted from six different apartments for not paying rent. He would move around different cheap hotels, refusing to move back in with his mother and sister, who had both moved back to New York. He would visit occasionally to eat a meal there.

He was fired from his job at Sound Masters, after being promoted to film cutter, due to being too young to join the union. Donahue wrote a letter to Darrell Brady, a family friend and working associate of his father, who managed a film company, Commercial Film Industries. After a few months, Brady wrote back and offered him a job with his company in Los Angeles. He also invited Donahue to stay at his home until he found a proper place to live.

== Career ==
=== 1956–1958: Early career ===
In February 1956, Donahue moved to Calabasas, California and stayed in Brady's home. He worked cutting film at Brady's company. He would later rent a garage apartment in Malibu, near his mother and sister's new home. In spring that same year, producer William Asher and director James Sheldon spotted Donahue in a diner in Malibu and arranged for a screen test with Columbia Pictures. The weekend before the big meeting, Donahue suffered a near-fatal auto accident, plummeting 40 feet down into a canyon and smashing into a tree. He was hospitalized for various injuries, missing the test.

Later that year, Donahue was introduced to actress Fran Bennett. Bennett introduced him to her agent Henry Willson, who also represented movie heart-throbs Rock Hudson, Robert Wagner, Tab Hunter, and Chad Everett. Willson signed him and changed his name to Troy Donahue:

At first they had Paris, the lover of Helen of Troy, in mind. But I guess they thought they couldn't name me Paris Donahue because there was already a Paris, France, and Paris, Illinois. It took me five minutes to get used to the new name.

Donahue signed a six-month contract, including extension options, with Universal Studios in October 1956. He earned a $125 weekly salary and with that, moved to North Hollywood. Donahue started off in small roles in films such as Man Afraid, Man of a Thousand Faces, The Tarnished Angels, Above All Things, and The Monolith Monsters (all 1957). In 1958, he had a small part in Charles F. Haas' Summer Love and Paul Henreid's Live Fast, Die Young.

Due to Donahue's heavy drinking and a 1958 arrest for speeding, his contract with Universal was at its end. He had spent all his money and had no work, leaving him unable to pay for his apartment. Willson was able to secure guest starring roles in several western shows, allowing Donahue to rent a slightly smaller apartment in Hollywood.

Donahue began appearing on TV in a guest part in Man Without a Gun. This was followed by parts in This Happy Feeling, Wild Heritage, Voice in the Mirror, The Perfect Furlough, and Monster on the Campus. He often had better roles on TV, guest-starring in episodes of The Californians, Rawhide, Wagon Train, Tales of Wells Fargo, and The Virginian.

=== 1959–1964: A Summer Place and Warner Bros. ===
The big break of Donahue's career came when he was cast opposite Sandra Dee in the 1959 Warner Bros' film A Summer Place, directed by Delmer Daves. The movie was released to mixed critical reception, but still managed to gain widespread popularity and became a box-office hit. The film was No. 1 at the US box-office for two weeks. The film and its soundtrack have been continuously noted in popular culture since the film's release, the first being in another Donahue film, The Crowded Sky (1960), between Donahue's character and co-star Efrem Zimbalist Jr.; the popular "Theme from A Summer Place" is heard on the restaurant sound system.

Donahue became a celebrity overnight, especially among teenage audiences. In John L. Scott's Los Angeles Times review, he wrote simply of him, "Donahue reveals promise." In 1960, he was named by The Film Daily as one of the five "finds" of the year. He would later receive the Golden Globe Award for "Most Promising Newcomer – Male" at the 17th Annual awards. Following the success, Warner's signed him to a long-term contract in 1959, with a beginning salary of $400 weekly ($4,300 weekly in 2024). Warner Bros. immediately sent Donahue on a cross-country tour to promote the film.

Journalist Joan Beck wrote about Donahue's lifestyle in the Chicago Tribune on October 22, 1959:

To plug the movie – and sell himself, too – Troy is touring the country with press agents and studio representatives from Warner Bros., to whom he is under contract. He's lionized by reporters for high school newspapers at special teen press conferences. He talks on disk jockey radio programs, women's television shows and teenage TV dancing parties. And for a dash of glamour, he's being seen at posh restaurants and celebrity gathering spots. He's interviewed by columnists and photographed by fan magazines – which appeal almost totally to teens these days. Along with the publicity build-up, Troy has acquired several other accoutrements of a successful star. He has a top Hollywood agent. A business manager who keeps him on a $35 weekly allowance. A bachelor apartment. A Porsche. And a circle of friends which includes many of the other rising young teen favorites of the movie colony. Now that all the proper stops have been pulled out, Hollywood's star makers expect teenagers to respond with a chorus of enthusiasm loud enough to sweep Troy into real movie stardom. They don't doubt that the tall, blue-eyed actor has what it takes to capture the all-important high school audience.

He guest starred in a variety of their western television series, including Colt .45 (1959), Maverick (1959), Sugarfoot (1959), The Alaskans (1960), and Lawman (1960). He also had a support part in a disaster movie, The Crowded Sky (1960). Donahue achieved good reviews for a brief, but effective part in Douglas Sirk's Imitation of Life (1959), playing Frankie, a young white man who beats his new girlfriend after he discovers she is black. Donahue also had a brief tenure as a recording artist at the height of his fame in the early 1960s, releasing a handful of singles for Warner Bros. Records, including "Live Young" and "Somebody Loves Me". No recordings entered the Billboard Hot 100 list.

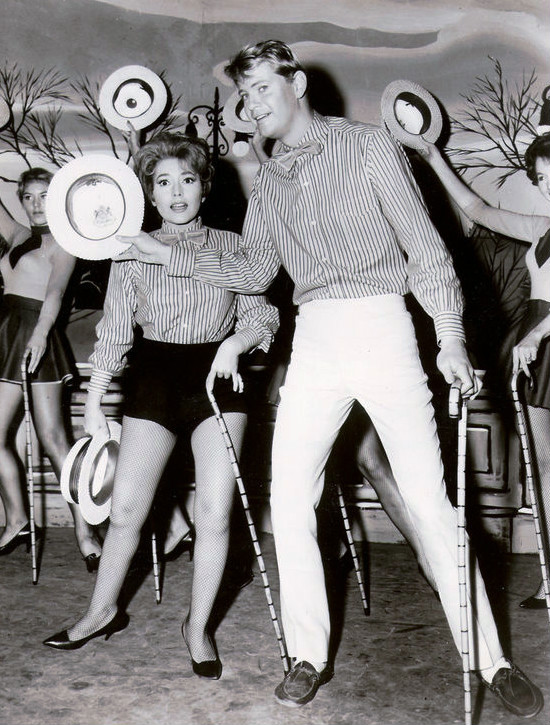
Donahue with showgirl Margarita Sierra in the ABC/Warner Bros. television series Surfside 6 (1961)

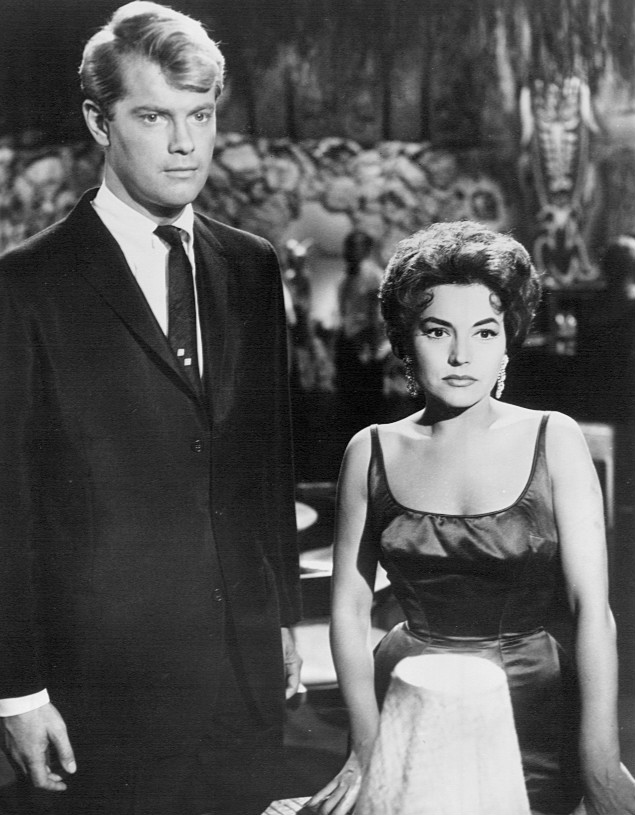
Donahue and Sierra on the set of Surfside 6.

He was reportedly going to be cast in Elia Kazan's 1961 American period drama Splendor in the Grass, but missed out to Warren Beatty. Instead Warner Bros. put him in a TV series, Surfside 6 (1960–62), one of several spin-offs of 77 Sunset Strip, announced in April 1960. On Surfside 6, Donahue starred with Van Williams, Lee Patterson, Diane McBain, and Margarita Sierra in the ABC series, set in Miami Beach, Florida. The show launched him as a household name.

He was sent on press junkets around the country to visit radio and television stations. Warner Bros. charged thousands for an appearance of him, yet Donahue never received a bonus. Donahue's face was plastered on merchandise, from posters to lunch boxes to board games, without ever receiving any revenue.

McBain spoke on the marketing of the show:

Sex sells. The boys and I were sold as sex symbols, and so much of the publicity campaign had all of us posing in swimsuits and frolicking around the beach. Troy was a beach-lover for sure – I think he would have been content to live in a tent on the beach all his life – but for the rest of us, it seemed so contrived. And more importantly, whatever acting abilities or ambitions we had seemed to be dismissed in favor of cheesecake and beefcake pictures.

After Surfside 6 was canceled, Donahue joined the cast of Hawaiian Eye, another spinoff of Sunset Strip, for its last season from 1962 to 1963 in the role of hotel director Philip Barton. He joined Robert Conrad and Connie Stevens in the series lead.

Donahue struggled with acting in television, believing himself to be a movie star, as opposed to a TV star. Both Donahue and Stevens expressed disinterest in the shows and their current career paths. They complained of a "mediocre pattern" and a "lack of great scripts" to journalist Edith Efron. This unhappiness began to fuel Donahue's drinking habits. In return, criticisms began to rise concerning his acting. Journalist Rick Du Brow wrote of him, "Troy is big and strong and has the rare ability to make the most glamorous and exciting events seem colorless and flat."

Donahue's career received another big break when Joshua Logan dropped out as director of Parrish (1961). Logan was replaced by A Summer Place director, Delmer Daves, who brought in Donahue to star. The movie became a box-office hit. Donahue would later describe the film as the most satisfying of his movies to date. "I had the best script and the best opportunity as an actor", he said. "Not too many of those came my way."

Donahue and Daves reunited for another melodrama in 1961, Susan Slade, with Connie Stevens, Dorothy McGuire and Lloyd Nolan also starring. They made a fourth film, Rome Adventure (1962), a romance starring Suzanne Pleshette, Angie Dickinson, and Rossano Brazzi. Donahue and Pleshette were married for six months.

In 1962, he claimed he received 5,000–7,500 fan letters a week. The following year, exhibitors voted him the 20th most popular star in the US. Donahue had also gained wide popularity in Japan, later saying:

I guess because I was blond, blue-eyed, and tanned, people associated me with all those beach movies that were around then, even though I never did one. I was always the goody-goody, the guy who did what he was supposed to.

He did appear in a nearly beach-party film, Palm Springs Weekend (1963), alongside several other Warner Bros. players. His final film for Warner Bros. was the 1964 western A Distant Trumpet, the last film of director Raoul Walsh.

=== 1965–1968: Leaving Warner Bros. and bankruptcy ===
In 1965, Donahue was cast as a psychopathic killer opposite Joey Heatherton in William Conrad's My Blood Runs Cold. While Donahue was happy to break type and play a different type of role, it was not well received by the public. His contract with Warner Bros. ended shortly thereafter—although it ran until early 1968, Donahue asked to be released from it in January 1966. Donahue later claimed:

Jack Warner called every studio I used to work for and used his muscle to keep me busted. I was blackballed and everyone in the business knew it. Please print that. I made one film in Europe playing a Victorian astronaut [1967's Jules Verne's Rocket to the Moon, better known by its American title, Those Fantastic Flying Fools] but no one ever saw it. Then by the time I could get work again, it was too late because my type was already out of fashion.

Reflecting on this period, he recalled:

They pumped me til the well went dry. My image came out of Warner Bros. and it was one that was on its way out. I think I'm a little deeper than the roles I was given to play. I did get great exposure at Warner Bros. [but] now I'm free to call my own shots. I've made more money in two years on my own than the whole time I was under contract.

Donahue appeared in a variety of smaller projects, including a spy spoof, Come Spy with Me (1967); and a western for Albert Zugsmith, The Phantom Gunslinger (1970).

From 1966 to 1967, Donahue co-starred in an onstage production of The Owl and the Pussycat on tour with his then-wife, Valerie Allen. The show had great success, resulting from Donahue's dedicated fanbase. In 1967, Donahue was slated to co-star in a Poor Richard production with Allen at the Pheasant Run Playhouse. In the week before, Donahue was drunk and could not focus on his lines. A few days before opening, he walked from the show, despite Allen begging him to stay. Terry Moore was brought in at the last minute to replace him. Donahue was sued.

On February 22, 1968, Donahue signed a long-term contract with Universal Studios for films and TV. This lasted a year and saw him get four roles: guest shots on Ironside (1968), The Name of the Game (1968), and The Virginian (1969), and an appearance in the TV movie The Lonely Profession (1969).

Due to his recent divorce from Allen and other lawsuits, Donahue was advised to file bankruptcy by his lawyer and he reluctantly did so on October 1, 1968. He eventually lost his home and began sleeping on friends' couches. He claimed that he "spent a lot of time judging beauty contests and opening banks" during this time.

I was living like a movie star but wasn't being paid like one. I lived way over my head and got into great trouble and lost everything. I went from a beautiful home, garden, swimming pool to living in shabby apartments.

Donahue was struggling to make his way in a changing Hollywood. As he said later, "If you're the boy next door and you're supposed to be squeaky clean, all you had to do was let your sideburns grow and suddenly you were a hippie." Donahue says when he met casting directors they would ask, "Why don't you comb your hair? How come you've grown a moustache? What are you doing with a beard?" Donahue also believed his career was hurt by the fact he was an anti-Vietnam War Democrat while "everybody assumed [he] was a Republican."

=== 1969–1974: New York, video nasties and The Godfather Part II ===
In 1969, he married executive secretary Alma Sharpe and moved from Los Angeles to Sharpe's Manhattan apartment. While in New York, Donahue appeared in the daytime CBS drama The Secret Storm for six months.

Donahue was interviewed by Carol Kramer for New York Today in May 1970. Kramer noted key differences in Donahue's appearance and demeanor, reporting that he was not the heartthrob that fans once knew and loved. She noted his love for astrology, belief in God and reincarnation, and that he had tried psychoanalysis. By 1971, Donahue blamed his inability to find work on the outdated image created for him a decade before by the studio. At the same time his agent Henry Willson retired, leaving him without representation.

He starred in the Robert L. Robert's 1971 film Sweet Savior as a Charles Manson-esque cult leader. The movie received criticism for being a video nasty exploitation film, being credited as a "blood-gushing shocker!" Donahue shocked the public when he assumed the Manson-like appearance, from clothing to hair. He defended the film, stating that:

I play Moon, a religious creep who murders a lot of people, a real heavy trip. But I don't want anyone to think I'm playing it in some phony exploitation flick that takes advantage of the Manson case to make a fast buck. I don't like many things, man, but I dig this picture... We're trying to show both sides of the problem. The Hollywood glamour society is as guilty as the depraved hippie cults. They pick up people on Sunset Boulevard and tease them. When they made fun of Manson they picked on the wrong guy. I was up at the Tate house. It was a freaky scene. Sure, I met Manson, at the beach playing volleyball.

He also had roles in low-budget films such as The Last Stop (1972), and Seizure (1974), Oliver Stone's directorial debut.

By this time, Donahue's drug addiction and alcoholism had ruined him financially. After splitting from Sharpe, Donahue claimed he was homeless and lived in a bush in Central Park. To survive, he depended on friends and even fans. Donahue stated, "I went home with fans for a hot meal or a shower. And a couch or bed to sleep in. I did what I had to do."

In November 1971, Donahue chopped his hair, shedding his new look, and moved to Atlanta, Georgia to play a cop in Michael Meola's independent film Without Last Rites. However, the project was never completed after the funds ran out in just a few weeks. Donahue and the rest of the cast and crew were never paid. With no upcoming acting jobs, Donahue accepted a celebrity-for-pay engagement to host a mall-wide fashion show at the Lafayette Plaza Shopping Center in Bridgeport, Connecticut on May 26, 1972. When interviewed by the Bridgeport Post, he said he had been either "working to the extreme," or concentrating on "intensely goofing off."

In the spring of 1973, Donahue traveled to the Philippines to make the low-budget, gory action film South Sea Massacre. The film was directed by Pablo Santiago and written by Leo Martinez. The movie was criticized for a lack of story and an abundance of nudity, rapes, beatings, decapitations, machete slayings, and machine gun attacks. The film was never released theatrically in the United States. He also appeared in Cockfighter (1974) for director Monte Hellman.

In December 1973, Donahue returned to Atlanta to promote and participate in a concert at Omni Coliseum to raise money for the Wounded Knee defense fund. Donahue assisted the local AIM office to generate publicity for the benefit concert which starred Paul Ortega, a Mescalero Apache. Donahue acted as the master of ceremonies at the show, which featured singer-songwriter John Hartford, actor Burt Reynolds, Doc and Merle Watson, Yoko Ono, several local performers, and Sacheen Little Feather.

In 1974, former classmate Francis Ford Coppola learned of Donahue's situation. Coppola cast him in a small part in The Godfather Part II as the fiancé of Connie Corleone. His character was named Merle Johnson, a nod to Donahue's real name. Donahue was paid $10,000 ($63,000 in 2024) for the role for one week's work.

=== 1974–2000: Final years ===
He made his first television appearance in years as a guest star on The Merv Griffin Show in August 1974. Donahue moved back to Los Angeles the same year. On March 15, 1975, he participated in the Easter Benefit Ball in San Francisco. The proceeds from the event benefited the Easter Seals Society for Crippled Children and Adults of San Francisco. Donahue led the celebrity judge panel that included film stars Jane Withers, Janet Blair, and Terry Moore.

Without a studio to promote him, with no money to afford a publicist, and news agencies uninterested in covering his every move, he found it difficult to keep his name in the public eye. In the summer of 1975, he licensed his name and likeness to a marketing company called First Seen, Inc. in New York. For $5.98, the company sent a specially recorded LP album featuring Donahue explaining how to get into show business. Advertisements appeared in tabloids around the country.

A new agent found him occasional television guest spots, such as Ellery Queen, The Hardy Boys, and CHiPs. Donahue also appeared as himself in the 1950s-themed sitcom Laverne and Shirley. Donahue appeared in a variety of whiskey commercials for the Japanese television market. Donahue said in 1978:

After eight years at Warners, I did a few independent pictures that never went anyplace. I traveled, played stickball, had a few marriages and many affairs. I just totally enjoyed myself and did the things I didn't get to do when I was a kid. Now I've decided I wanna go back to work again, and I've been encouraged by a lot of people who feel that I have the talent and everything that goes with it.

Following his 1981 divorce from fourth wife, Vicki Taylor, he fell off the grid and lost contact with most of his friends – many of whom had lost patience with him long before. His agent had let him go, professionals were not calling him, and they didn't return his calls. One friend warned him, that in his current physical state, he was uninsurable for producers. He spent months at the beach, often spending the night there in his car.

Former actor turned producer Aaron Spelling paved the way for Troy Donahue's return to television, casting him in episodes of Vega$, Fantasy Island, The Love Boat, and Matt Houston. Donahue appeared in a supporting role in the 1984 feature film Grandview, U.S.A.

On September 19, an 8.0 earthquake had caused major damage to Mexico City, and killed at least five thousand people. On October 6, 1985, Donahue hosted a telethon in Palm Springs to raise money for the American Red Cross Mexican Earthquake Relief Fund. The telethon was broadcast live from the ballroom of the Sheraton Plaza Hotel. Numerous celebrities participated, including Cameron Mitchell and June Lockhart. Trini Lopez performed. The five-hour event raised more than $27,400 (equivalent to $82,022 in 2025).

By 1990, Troy Donahue was a faded name, more familiar as a bygone image than a current personality. Director John Waters recognized Donahue's symbolizing the late 1950s and hired him for the 1990 romantic-comedy musical Cry-Baby, paying tribute to Donahue's teen-idol days.

In 1997, Donahue toured from January to May with Encore Attractions' production of Bye Bye Birdie. He starred alongside Casey Marshall, Krista Pigotti, and Chuck Ragsdale.

In July 1998, he joined Sandra Dee at the Castro Theatre for a one-night revival of A Summer Place. Donahue also worked for Holland-America Lines, sailing for two months each year, doing a seminar discussing film and theater improvisations.

Donahue continued to act in films throughout the 1980s and into the late 1990s. However, he never regained the recognition that he had in the earlier years of his career. His final film role was in the 2000 comedy short film The Boys Behind the Desk, directed by Sally Kirkland that was never released.

== Personal life ==
In 1956, Donahue was in a near-fatal accident. While under the influence, he skidded off Malibu Canyon Road and plummeted 40 feet into the canyon below. The car crashed into a tree, stopping the vehicle from falling the remaining 250 feet. He managed to escape from the car and crawl back up to the road, meeting his friend who had been flung from the car and onto the road. The two were found by a passing motorist and taken to the hospital.

Donahue slipped in and out of consciousness for two days. He suffered two cracked ribs, a bruised spinal cord, a concussion, a cracked kneecap, and a crushed kidney. In addition, he had forty stitches and lost a tooth.

=== Relationships and abuse allegations ===
==== Judi Meredith ====
In 1956, Donahue met actress Judi Meredith and the two began dating. The studio encouraged the romance and sent them on "publicity dates". Meredith would move into Donahue's North Hollywood apartment. The couple separated in 1958 due to her claims of Donahue being "too rough and too possessive". Meredith would go on to allege that Donahue "stormed into [her] place ... and pushed [her] face into a glass-covered picture" upon learning (after their breakup) that she was dating a mutual friend.

==== Nan Morris ====
In 1957, he began a relationship with Nan Morris. They were engaged at one point during the two-year relationship; however, Donahue continued to see other women. Donahue would continuely attempt to break up the engagement and admit to meeting other women, with Morris not believing his confessions. Morris attempted to salvage the relationship, but would eventually walk into Donahue in the midst of an affair. Morris, still not believing the affair, refused to leave the apartment, however Donahue ended the relationship and sent her away.

Donahue allegedly became physically abusive with Morris during arguments, including, at one point, throwing her into the pool.

==== Lili Kardell ====
Donahue first met Swedish actress and model Lili Kardell at a Halloween party in 1956. The two reconnected in 1960 and began a romance, becoming engaged in January 1961. The engagement was ended the same year after an alleged domestic abuse incident. Kardell claimed that she had gone to Donahue's home on August 16 to pick up her dog and found him with another woman. According to her, Donahue charged at her and she slapped him in defense. The two got into a fistsfight and he punched her in the face, knocking her to the floor. Donahue denied Kardell's version of the events; however, he agreed that the argument did become physical.

Diane McBain, Donahue's Surfside 6 co-star, admitted to having an affair with him at this time as well; however, she claimed that she was unaware he had a serious girlfriend.

==== Suzanne Pleshette ====
In December 1960, Donahue met actress Suzanne Pleshette in New York, while dating Kardell. They would later be cast as on-screen lovers in Rome Adventure (1962), where they began their relationship. They announced their engagement on December 2, 1963, and wed on January 5, 1964, in Beverly Hills, California.

Pleshette filed for divorce in June 1964 on the grounds of mental cruelty from Donahue. She was awarded the divorce by the Superior court in Santa Monica, California. She would later state that Donahue was a "sweet, good man... [They] just were never destined to be married [and] didn't have the same values."

==== Valerie Allen ====
In 1966, Donahue met his second wife, actress Valerie Allen, at an audition for the film Come Spy With Me. The two began a relationship while filming the same year. Donahue and Allen married on October 21, 1966, in Dublin, Ireland. Allen filed for divorce in April 1968, citing "extreme cruelty" from Donahue. The divorce was finalized in November 1968, with Donahue agreeing to pay $14,000 then and $600 a month of alimony.

==== Alma Sharpe ====
Donahue's third marriage was to Alma Sharpe. Sharpe was a Jamaican-born executive secretary to the New York City health services administrator. They met in July 1969 and married on November 15 in Roanoke, Virginia. Donahue moved into Sharpe's Manhattan apartment and had an on-again/off-again relationship. Sharpe grew tired of Donahue's friends and became frustrated that he would not listen to her warnings about them. The two separated in the early '70s with Donahue packing a backpack and leaving upon Sharpe's request. Their divorce was finalized in summer of 1974.

==== Vicki Taylor ====
Donahue's fourth and final marriage was to land developer Vicki Taylor. They were married March 3, 1979 and lived in Taylor's Santa Monica apartment. Donahue admitted to cheating on her and would often sleep away from the apartment at friend's homes or on the beach. Donahue moved just months after the marriage and the divorce was finalized in early 1981.

==== Zheng Cao ====
Donahue began dating mezzo-soprano opera singer Zheng Cao in October 1991. The two met at his seminar for Holland America Line, where she was also working as a singer. Donahue and Cao were engaged and living together in Santa Monica, California, at the time of Donahue's death in 2001.

=== Children ===
In 1982, Donahue learned he had a son, Sean, by a woman with whom he had a brief relationship in 1969. As he recalled in 1984:

She walked over and introduced herself and I remembered that we had been together four or five times in L.A. in 1969. Nothing serious. Just fun and games. She said, "I'm glad I saw you. I've always wanted to tell you about something. Look over there, Troy." I looked and across the room I saw a 13 year-old, spitting image of what I looked like when I was young. "This is your son, Sean", she said. "He's known all his life that you are his father." ... I see him every couple of weeks now.

In early 1987, Donahue learned that he had another child: He was contacted by Janene Curtis, a woman claiming to be his daughter. Curtis was born in 1964 to an unidentified woman and was put up for adoption at birth. Upon finding her birthmother, she was told that Donahue was her biological father. Curtis reached out to Donahue, and the two later met. They remained close until Donahue's death.

=== Alcoholism and drug addiction ===
Donahue began drinking in the seventh grade, as a result of his father's health decline and later death. Donahue stated:

I think I was mad at my father for dying. A kid doesn't know how to process those things. I liked being by myself whenever I could. Even though I played sports, participated in school functions, and was always around kids. It was hard. I used to go and sit by myself. Funny, I liked being alone. It gave me a chance to think and read. But then I'd cut loose.

Donahue stated he did not blame the Hollywood lifestyle for his drinking habit. However, he would later state that he "never went before the cameras without having a buzz on." He admitted to getting drunk with Julie London on the way to film Voice in the Mirror, falling out of the limo and trying to sober up. Donahue claimed that he was "drinking half a pint of vodka mixed with codeine". Donahue admitted that he began abusing drugs and alcohol at the peak of his career and increased use after his career began to wane:

I was loaded all the time ... I'd wake up about 6:30 in the morning, take three aspirins mixed with codeine, slug down half a pint of vodka, and then do four lines of cocaine. That was just so I could get the front door open to peek out and see if I could face the day ... I would lie, steal, and cheat, all those wonderful things that drunks do. I was crafty. Nobody knew how much I drank then. If a bottle was out on the counter, I'd take a swig when I passed it and quickly put it back.

As his career progressed and Warner Bros. pushed for Donahue to star in more television, his drinking habit increased. Donahue was unhappy with the trajectory of his career, fueling frustration and further drinking. While he was often drunk on set, former co-star Diane McBain could never recall smelling alcohol on his breath during shoots.

In 1968, while performing for troops in Vietnam with the USO, Donahue had been obtaining "mind-numbing" drugs from the nurses. He later admitted that he went "partly because I had nowhere else to go, but mostly because I was into drugs, and I knew Vietnam was one big medicine chest". When Special Services became aware of this, he was dismissed and sent back to the United States. The Department of Defense still awarded Donahue a Certificate of Appreciation in February 1969.

He suffered from pancreatitis stemming from his drinking. The pain sent him to the hospital for days of treatment and recovery, on an average of once a year. In the summer of 1976, he was ill for nearly a month.

Immediately upon marrying his fourth wife, Vicki Taylor, Donahue resumed his previous self-destructive behavior: he drank heavily and used drugs. He stayed away from Taylor and the apartment for days at a time, passing out at friends' homes or sleeping on the beach. He failed to show up for scheduled auditions, or arrived looking disheveled and hungover. His drinking sent him to the hospital again for several days in early summer with a painful recurrence of pancreatitis. Doctors warned him that his uncontrolled drinking would kill him. On 5 February 1982, Donahue's addiction problem culminated in an embarrassing incident when he accompanied Julie Newmar to the wrap party for her film Hysterical. He was extremely drunk and dozens of photographers captured his antics. He was again hospitalized for nearly two weeks with pancreatitis.

After his fourth marriage ended in 1981, Donahue decided to seek help for his drinking and drug use. In May 1982, he joined Alcoholics Anonymous, which he credited for helping him achieve and maintain sobriety. Donahue stated, "I realized I was going to die, and I was dying – or, worse than that, I might live the way I was living for the rest of my life."

Donahue was almost twenty years sober when he died in 2001.

== Legal issues ==
In 1958, Donahue received five speeding tickets that all went ignored. After his sixth ticket, it was revealed he had five warrants. On April 17, he was sentenced to 15 days in Los Angeles County Jail. This caused him to miss a promotional tour for the film This Happy Feeling (1958).

On August 9, 1968, the U.S. Tax Court ruled in favor of the Internal Revenue Service to collect $5,138.90 (equivalent to $45,500 in 2024) in back taxes from Donahue. His accountant had prepared the actor's 1964 income tax return. At the time, Donahue was involved in his divorce from Suzanne Pleshette. The court decided his filing status had been incorrectly reported, which resulted in a delinquent tax bill.

=== Lili Kardell civil suit ===
In 1961, Kardell sued him for $60,450 in damages, claiming he had hit her without provocation. Kardell claimed that she had gone to Donahue's home on August 16, 1961, to pick up her dog and found him with another woman. According to her, Donahue charged at her and she slapped him. The two got into a fistfight and he punched her in the face, knocking her to the floor. Donahue recounted the story differently, but agreed that blows were exchanged between the two.

In an attempt to suppress the news, Warner Bros. president Jack L. Warner settled the case out of court for $3,000 ($31,300 in 2024) for medical and legal expenses, as well as a new two-piece suit for Kardell, to replace her ripped one. In return, Kardell was banned from the Warner lot and she disappeared from Hollywood.

=== Modern Screen Magazine lawsuit ===
On January 16, 1963, Donahue filed a $200,000 lawsuit in Santa Monica against Modern Screen magazine, Dell Publishing Co., and 17-year-old Joyce Becker, a self-described actress and writer, who wrote an inflammatory article the magazine published titled, "The First Time Troy Made Love to Me".

Donahue protested that the article described them as better friends than they really were. His lawyer said they were only casually acquainted and had met only once, when Becker interviewed Donahue for a teen magazine. Donahue's action claimed that the story violated privacy and said the statements in the article were "unjustified and untrue". Eventually, Dell Publishing Co. printed a retraction, and paid Donahue an undisclosed settlement.

=== Arbua Productions lawsuit ===
On February 22, 1968, Arbua Productions, the talent hiring agency for the Pheasant Run Playhouse in Illinois, won a default judgement against him in the amount of $100,000 (equivalent to $925,837 in 2025). The actor was accused of inducing his wife, Valerie Allen, to break a contract with the theater, and walk out with him days before the production, Poor Richard, was scheduled to open. Donahue did not appear at the pleadings, and Allen was not named in the suit.

== Death ==
On August 30, 2001, Donahue suffered a heart attack and was admitted to Saint John's Health Center in Santa Monica, California. An emergency angioplasty was performed successfully; however, Donahue suffered a second heart attack. He underwent bypass surgery on September 1.

Donahue died on September 2, 2001 at the age of 65.

=== Vioxx case and the estate ===
In 2005, Donahue's daughter, Janene Curtis, hired a New York law firm to represent her in a class-action suit against Merck & Co. Curtis and Donahue's close friend, Jane Nunez, believed the prescription painkiller Vioxx was the cause behind her father's death. Donahue's sister and estate executor, Eve O'Neill, assisted in signing Curtis as an administrator of the estate to pursue the lawsuit. In September 2009, Curtis directed the lawyers to accept a settlement of $300,000, without the knowledge of executor O'Neill. However, Curtis' lawyers learned that she had been adopted at birth, leaving her no right to the estate and therefore, they could not accept the settlement without O'Neill's approval.

Curtis petitioned the court to restore her rights on the basis that Donahue had openly accepted her as his daughter before his death. The trial court ruled in Curtis's favor, finding that O'Neill was negligent in failing to learn legal impediments against Curtis, in addition to her previously stating she did not want the recovered funds, believing Donahue would want Curtis to have it. Curtis was awarded the full Vioxx settlement by the court.

== Discography ==
- Live Young (1963)
- Somebody Loves Me (1963)

== Filmography ==
=== Film ===
Year	Title	Role	Notes
1957	Man Afraid	Reporter	Uncredited
1957	Man of a Thousand Faces	Assistant Director in Bullpen	Uncredited
1957	The Tarnished Angels	Frank Burnham	
1957	Flood Tide	Teenager at Beach	Uncredited
1957	The Monolith Monsters	Hank Jackson	Uncredited
1957	Summer Love	Sax Lewis	
1958	Live Fast, Die Young	Artie Sanders / Artie Smith	
1958	This Happy Feeling	Tony Manza	
1958	Wild Heritage	Jesse Bascomb	
1958	Voice in the Mirror	Paul Cunningham	
1958	The Perfect Furlough	Sgt. Nickles	
1958	Monster on the Campus	Jimmy Flanders	
1959	Imitation of Life	Frankie	
1959	A Summer Place	Johnny Hunter	
1960	The Crowded Sky	McVey	
1961	Parrish	Parrish McLean	
1961	Susan Slade	Hoyt Brecker	
1962	Rome Adventure	Don Porter	
1963	Palm Springs Weekend	Jim Munroe	
1964	A Distant Trumpet	2nd Lt. Matthew "Matt" Hazard	
1965	My Blood Runs Cold	Ben Gunther	
1967	Come Spy with Me	Pete Barker	
1967	Jules Verne's Rocket to the Moon	Gaylord	U. S. title: Those Fantastic Flying Fools
1970	The Phantom Gunslinger	Bill	
1971	Sweet Savior	Moon	Alternative title: Frenetic Party
1972	The Last Stop	Sheriff	
1974	Seizure	Mark Frost	
1974	Cockfighter	Randall Mansfield	
1974	South Seas	Steve	
1974	The Godfather: Part II	Merle Johnson	
1977	The Legend of Frank Woods	Sheriff John Baxom	
1977	Ultraje	Daniel	
1983	Tin Man	Lester	
1984	Katy the Caterpillar	Chester	Voice, English-dubbed version
1984	Grandview, U.S.A.	Donny Vinton	
1986	Low Blow	John Templeton	Alternative title: The Last Fight to Win: The Bloody End
1987	Fight to Win	Rosenberg	Alternative titles: Dangerous Passages; Eyes of the Dragon
1987	Cyclone	Bob Jenkins	
1987	Hyôryu kyôshitsu	Taggart	English title: The Drifting Classroom
1987	Hollywood Cop	Lt. Maxwell	
1987	Deadly Prey	Don Michaelson	
1988	Hawkeye	Mayor	Alternative title: Karate Cops
1988	Hard Rock Nightmare	Uncle Gary	
1989	Assault of the Party Nerds	Sid Witherspoon	Direct-to-video release
1989	American Rampage	Police Psychiatrist	
1989	Dr. Alien	Dr. Ackerman	
1989	Terminal Force	Slim	
1989	Sounds of Silence	Larry Haughton	
1989	Bad Blood	Jack Barnes	
1989	Hot Times at Montclair High	Mr. Nichols	
1989	Blood Nasty	Barry Hefna	
1989	The Chilling	Dr. Miller	
1989	Deadly Spygames	Python	
1989	The Platinum Triangle	Harold Farber	
1990	Click: The Calendar Girl Killer	Alan	
1990	Cry-Baby	Hatchetface's Father	
1990	Omega Cop	Slim	
1990	Nudity Required	Jack	Alternative title: Young Starlet
1990	Sexpot	Phillip	
1991	Shock 'Em Dead	Record Exec	
1991	Deadly Diamonds	Matt Plimpton	Direct-to-video release
1992	Double Trouble	Leonard	
1992	The Pamela Principle	Troy	
1993	Showdown	Police Captain	
1998	Merchants of Venus	FBI Agent	Alternative title: A Dirty Little Business
2000	The Boys Behind the Desk		Short film, unreleased

=== Television ===
Year	Title	Role	Notes
1958	Man Without a Gun	Jan	Episode: "Night of Violence"
1958	The Californians		Episode: "A Girl Named Sue"
1959	Rawhide	Buzz Travis	Episode: "Incident at Alabaster Plain"
1959	Wagon Train	Ted Garner	Segment: "The Hunter Malloy Story"
1959	Tales of Wells Fargo	Cliff Smith	Episode: "The Rawhide Kid"
1959	Maverick	Dan Jamison	Episode: "Pappy"
1959	Sugarfoot	Ken Savage	Episode: "The Wild Bunch"
1959	Colt .45	James 'Jim' Gibson	Episode: "The Hothead"
1959	Bronco	Roy Parrott; Bart Bonner	2 episodes
1959	The Alaskans	Ted Andrews	Episode: "Heart of Gold"
1960	Lawman	David Manning	Episode: "The Payment"
1960–1961	77 Sunset Strip	Star Bright; Sandy Winfield	2 episodes
1960–1962	Surfside 6	Sandy Winfield II	71 episodes
1962–1963	Hawaiian Eye	Philip Barton	26 episodes
1965	The Patty Duke Show	Dr. Morgan	Episode: "Operation: Tonsils"
1968	Ironside	Father Dugan	2 episodes
1968	The Name of the Game	Norman Hoak	Episode: "Nightmare"
1969	The Virginian	Bracken	Episode: "Fox, Hound and the Widow McCloud"
1969	The Lonely Profession	Julian Thatcher	Television movie
1970	The Secret Storm	R.B. Keefer	
1976	Ellery Queen	Gilbert Mallory	Episode: "The Adventure of the Sinister Scenario"
1977	The Godfather Saga	Merle Johnson	Miniseries
1978	The Hardy Boys/Nancy Drew Mysteries	Alan Summerville	Episode: "Mystery on the Avalanche Express"
1978	CHiPs	Bob Niles	Episode: "Peaks and Valleys"
1978	Vega$	Teddy Howard	Episode: "The Games Girls Play"
1978	The Eddie Capra Mysteries	Duane	Episode: "Dying Declaration"
1978–1981	Fantasy Island	Jack Terry; Wallis Jaeger	2 episodes
1980	Laverne and Shirley	Himself	1 episode
1980	The Love Boat	Mr. Clark	Episode: "Tell Her She's Great..."
1982	Matt Houston	William 'Willie' Hoyt	Episode: "Joey's Here"
1983	Malibu	Clint Redman	Television movie
1990	Monsters	Dr. Thomas Becker	Episode: "Micro Minds"
1998	Legion	Flemming	Television movie
1999	Shake, Rattle and Roll: An American Love Story	Rob Kamen	Miniseries

=== Box-office ranking ===
- 1960: voted 5th most likely star of Tomorrow
- 1961: 24th most popular star in the US
- 1963: 20th most popular star in the US

== Theatre ==
Year	Title	Role	Director	Venue	Notes	Ref.
1966–1967	The Owl and the Pussycat	Felix	Philip Rose	Ivanhoe Theatre, Chicago		
1997	Love Letters		Luke Yankee	Sacramento Theatre, Sacramento		
1998	Bye Bye Birdie	Harry MacAfee		—N/a	Tour	

== Awards and nominations ==
Year	Award	Category	Nominated work	Result	Ref.
1960	Golden Globe Awards	Most Promising Newcomer – Male	A Summer Place	Won	
1960	Laurel Awards	Top Male New Personality	—N/a	Nominated	
1962	Photoplay Awards	Most Popular Male Star	—N/a	Won	

== In popular culture ==
- Donahue and Doug McClure served as inspiration for the name and certain character aspects of the character of Troy McClure on The Simpsons.
- Donahue is mentioned in the song "Look at Me, I'm Sandra Dee", from the 1971 musical Grease, reflecting his status as a teen idol at the time in which the action is set. The line, which is performed by Stockard Channing in the 1978 film version, is as follows: "As for you, Troy Donahue, I know what you want to do."
- Donahue is mentioned in the 1981 Ruben Blades song "Ligia Elena." In one part of the song, a wealthy white mother laments that her daughter, Ligia Elena, has run off with a lower class trumpet player of color, saying, "Yo pensaba que me iba a dar un nietecito con los cabellos rubios y los ojos rubios y los dientes rubios, así como Troy Donahue" ('I thought she was going to give me a little grandson with blonde hair and blonde eyes and blonde teeth, like Troy Donahue').
- Donahue is also mentioned in the song "Mother" in the musical A Chorus Line, when the character Bobby sings, "If Troy Donahue could be a movie star, then I could be a movie star."
