= Soap Opera Digest =

Weekly magazine covering American daytime soap operas

- Debut issue (November 1975), featuring the cast of Love of Life
- Editorial Director: Stephanie Sloane
- Staff writers: Mara Levinsky; Devin Owens
- Categories: Entertainment
- Frequency: Weekly
- Total circulation: 43,743 (Jul 2023)
- Founder: Angela Shapiro and Jerome Shapiro
- First issue: November 1975
- Final issue: November 13, 2023
- Company: American Media, Inc.
- Country: USA
- Based in: New York City
- Language: English
- Website: www.soapoperadigest.com
- ISSN: 0164-3584
- OCLC: 1352484837

Soap Opera Digest was a weekly magazine covering American daytime soap operas. It featured onscreen and offscreen news about various series, interviews with and articles about performers, storyline summaries and analysis, and related promotional information. Debuting in 1975, the magazine historically included certain prime time soap operas in its coverage as well.

== History ==
Soap Opera Digest debuted in November 1975, co-founded by Angela Shapiro and Jerome Shapiro and founding Editor Ruth J Gordon and featuring actors John Aniston, Ron Tomme, Audrey Peters, Birgitta Tolksdorf, Jerry Lacy, and Tudi Wiggins of Love of Life on its first cover. In the early 1990s, the magazine had up to 1.4 million subscribers.

In 1980, Network Publishing Corporation purchased the magazine from Shapiro, who went on to found Soap Opera Update. Rupert Murdoch's News Corporation bought the magazine from Gerry M. Ritterman in 1989. Ritterman had owned Soap Opera Digest for three years before selling it to Murdoch Magazines; Ritterman earned more than $50 million from his share of the $70 million purchase price. According to Ritterman, he'd purchased the magazine at 750,000 subscribers and sold it at 1.3 million. Murdoch sold Soap Opera Digest to K-III Communications (now Rent Group) in 1991. K-III was renamed Primedia in 1997, and sold its magazines to Source Interlink in 2007. American Media, Inc. began publishing Soap Opera Digest in 2011.

Soap Opera Digest originally published monthly, moved to triweekly issues in 1979, biweekly issues in 1980, and on April 1, 1997, started publishing weekly. The issue dates were on Tuesdays, but changed to Mondays beginning with the April 16, 2012 issue.

Meredith Brown Berlin was named executive editor (the magazine's equivalent of editor-in-chief) in 1982 at the age of 26, making her the youngest editor of a national magazine at that time. Ritterman later promoted her to editor-in-chief and vice president. She stayed in that position until 1991. During her tenure, the magazine saw its greatest circulation growth. Berlin was followed by Lynn Leahey, who headed the magazine for 27 years. In June 2011, Stephanie Sloane replaced Leahey as the magazine's editorial director.

The magazine used to hold an awards show annually to promote excellence in the genre, as decided by the fans who read the magazine. The Soap Opera Digest Awards (formerly the Soapies) have been held every year since 1977, and were last televised in 2000. The Soapy Award was originally designed by Janis Rogak, the magazine's then-Art Director. Berlin and Ritterman earned a handful of Daytime Emmy Award nominations, with Dick Clark Productions, for co executive producing the Soap Opera Digest Awards.

On October 27, 2023, it was announced a360media would cease production of the physical weekly publications. The magazine currently continues to update content on its website, and announced its intention to print "special print issues" at least four times per year.

== "Soap speak" acronyms ==
Soap Opera Digest coined the term and popularized the use of "soap speak," in which show names are abbreviated as acronyms to save space. These abbreviations have come into more extensive use outside the magazine with the advent of internet chat rooms and message boards.

For example, current soap operas and their acronyms include General Hospital (GH), The Bold and the Beautiful (B&B), and The Young and the Restless (Y&R). Days of Our Lives is referred to as DAYS in the magazine, though the acronym DOOL is sometimes used elsewhere; General Hospital: Night Shift was similarly designated SHIFT rather than under an acronym. Abbreviations used for now-defunct series include All My Children (AMC), Another World (AW), As the World Turns (ATWT), The Edge of Night (EON), Guiding Light (GL), Love of Life (LOL), One Life to Live (OLTL), Port Charles (PC), Ryan's Hope (RH), and Search for Tomorrow (SFT). The now-defunct series Sunset Beach (1997–1999) was known as BEACH to differentiate it from the previously cancelled series Santa Barbara (1984–1993), which itself had been referred to as SB. Other past series with single-word titles (like Capitol, Loving and Passions) had fully capitalized identifiers, while not typically abbreviating their titles in-reference. Prime time soap operas have also been attributed with acronyms and abbreviations in the magazine, including Beverly Hills, 90210 (90210), Melrose Place (MP) and Dynasty (DYN).

== Circulation ==
Soap Opera Digest's circulation has declined over the years, reflecting declines both in soap opera viewership and magazine circulations in general. A 40 percent decline in 2003 was due to eliminating reduced-rate subscriptions. This is a list of Soap Opera Digest's average circulation per issue, per year.

- 1988: 1.1 million
- 1998: 1,101,146
- 1999: 1,102,940
- 2000: 1,110,527
- 2001: 1,025,869
- 2002: 987,525
- 2003: 598,739
- 2004: 524,358
- 2005: 495,552
- 2006: 517,743
- 2007: 512,403
- 2008: 514,094
- 2009: 498,234
- 2010: 490,310
- 2016: 123,000
- 2019: 71,406
- 2022: 48,274
- 2023: 43,743

== See also ==
- Soap Opera Magazine
- Soap Opera Update
- Soap Opera Weekly
- Soaps In Depth
