= Stirling (surname) =

Origin
- Region of origin: Scotland
- Motto: Gang forward

Other names
- Variant forms: Sterling, Strivelynd

Stirling is a Scottish name that originated in Stirlingshire, Scotland. Since prior to the Norman Conquest the family held its seat in Stirling, Scotland.

People with the surname include:

- Sir Alexander Stirling (1927–2014), British ambassador
- Andy Stirling (born 1961), Professor of science and technology policy at Sussex University, England
- A. M. W. Stirling (1865–1965), British author
- Archie Stirling (born 1941), Laird of the Keir estate, Scotland
- Bob Stirling (1919–1991), English rugby union international
- Sir Charles Stirling (1760–1833), vice-admiral in the Royal Navy
- David Stirling (architect) (1822–1887), Canadian architect
- Sir David Stirling (1915–1990), British Army officer, founder of the Special Air Service
- M. David Stirling (born 1940), American politician, lawyer, and author
- Edward Stirling (playwright) (1809–1894), English adaptor of novels to the stage
- Edward Stirling (politician) (1804–1873), MLC in South Australia, father of Sir Edward
- Sir Edward Charles Stirling (1848–1919), South Australian anthropologist
- Frederick Stirling (1829–1885), Royal Navy admiral
- Geoff Stirling (1921–2013), Canadian businessman
- George Faulds Stirling (1877–1966), Canadian politician
- Gilbert de Stirling, early 13th-century bishop of Aberdeen, Scotland
- Grote Stirling (1875–1953), Canadian politician
- Harold Stirling (1904–1968), politician in Victoria, Australia
- Harriet Stirling (1878–1943), South Australian philanthropist, daughter of Sir Edward
- Hugh de Stirling, 13th-century bishop-elect of Dunkeld, Scotland
- Hugh Stirling (1907–1994), Canadian football player
- Iain Stirling (born 1988), Scottish comedian and television presenter
- Ian Stirling (biologist) (1941–2024), Canadian zoologist and marine biologist
- Ian Stirling (broadcaster) (1940–2005), British actor and television presenter
- James Stirling (disambiguation), several people, including

- James Stirling (mathematician) (1692–1770), Scottish mathematician
- Sir James Stirling, 1st Baronet (c.1740–1805), Scottish banker and lord provost of Edinburgh
- Sir James Stirling (Royal Navy officer) (1791–1865), British admiral and Governor of Western Australia
- James Stirling (engineer, born 1799) (1799–1876), Scottish engineer
- James Hutchison Stirling (1820–1909), Scottish philosopher
- James Stirling (engineer, born 1835) (1835–1917), Scottish locomotive engineer
- Sir James Stirling (judge) (1836–1916), British jurist
- James Stirling (botanist) (1852–1909), Australian botanist and geologist
- James Stirling (1890s footballer) (fl. 1895–1896), Scottish footballer
- Jimmy Stirling (1925–2006), Scottish footballer
- Sir James Stirling (architect) (1926–1992), British architect
- Sir James Stirling of Garden (1930–2024), British Army officer, chartered surveyor and Lord Lieutenant of Stirling and Falkirk
- James Stirling (physicist) (1953–2018), British physicist and Provost of Imperial College London

- Jan Stirling (born 1955), Australian basketball player and coach
- Jane Stirling (1804–1859), Scottish amateur pianist, student and friend of Frédéric Chopin
- Jered Stirling (born 1976), Scottish footballer
- John Stirling (disambiguation), several people
- Ken Stirling (born 1949), New Zealand former professional rugby league footballer, coach and administrator
- Kenneth Stirling (1935–1973), South Australian ecologist and philanthropist
- Sir Lancelot Stirling (1849–1932), Australian politician and grazier
- Linda Stirling (1921–1997), American showgirl, model and actress
- Lindsey Stirling (born 1986), American violinist, dancer, performance artist, and composer.
- Magdalene Stirling (1765–1846), Scottish composer
- Matthew Stirling (railway engineer) (1856–1931), Locomotive Superintendent of the Hull and Barnsley Railway
- Matthew Stirling (1896–1975), American ethnologist and archaeologist
- Pamela Stirling, New Zealand journalist and editor
- Patrick Stirling (railway engineer) (1820–1895), Chief Mechanical Engineer of the Great Northern Railway
- Patrick Stirling (born 1862) (1862−1925), English footballer and Mayor of Doncaster
- Paul Stirling (born 1990), Irish international cricketer
- Rachael Stirling (born 1977), English actress
- Radha Stirling (born 1978), British-Indian activist and lawyer
- Richard Stirling, British writer and actor
- Robert Stirling (1790–1878), Scottish clergyman, inventor of the Stirling engine
- Rosemary Stirling (born 1947), New Zealand-born Scottish athlete
- Scotty Stirling (1928/1929–2015), American sports executive and sportswriter
- Stephen Stirling (disambiguation), several people
- S. M. Stirling (born 1953), American science fiction author
- Syd Stirling (born 1951), Australian former politician
- Waite Stirling (1829–1923), English missionary, first Bishop of the Falkland Islands
- Sir William Stirling-Maxwell, 9th Baronet (1818–1878), Scottish historical writer, art historian, politician and virtuoso
- William Stirling (physiologist) (1851–1932), Scottish professor of physiology
- William Stirling (British Army officer) (1907–1973), British general
- Yates Stirling (1843–1929), US Navy rear admiral
- Yates Stirling Jr. (1872–1948), US Navy rear admiral

== See also ==
- Sterling (surname)
