= Stirling (disambiguation) =

Stirling is a city and former ancient burgh in Scotland. Stirling may also refer to:

== Places ==
=== Australia ===
==== Western Australia ====
- City of Stirling, Perth
  - Stirling, Western Australia, a Perth suburb within the City of Stirling
  - Division of Stirling, an electoral district in the Australian House of Representatives
- Stirling County, Western Australia
- Electoral district of Stirling, an electoral district in the Western Australian Legislative Assembly
- Stirling Range, a mountain range in Western Australia
- Stirling Estate, Western Australia, a locality in the Shire of Capel

==== Elsewhere ====
- Mount Stirling, Victoria
- Stirling, South Australia, a town east of Adelaide
- Stirling, Australian Capital Territory
- Stirling, Victoria, an abandoned township near Tambo Crossing
- Stirling Park, part of Stirling Linear Park, South Australia

=== Canada ===
- Stirling, Alberta, a village
- Stirling, a village in the township of Stirling-Rawdon, Ontario

=== Scotland ===
- Stirling (council area)
- Stirling (Scottish Parliament constituency)
- Stirling (UK Parliament constituency)
- Stirling (Parliament of Scotland constituency), which ceased to exist in 1707
- Stirlingshire or County of Stirling, a historic county and registration county
- Stirling Sill, an outcropping or sill that underlies a large part of central Scotland
- Stirling Village, Aberdeenshire

=== United States ===
- Stirling, New Jersey, an unincorporated community
- Stirling (Massaponax, Virginia), a historic plantation
- Stirling City, California, an unincorporated community

=== Elsewhere ===
- Mount Stirling (Antarctica), a mountain
- Stirling, New Zealand, a settlement
- Stirling Island, Solomon Islands

== Schools ==
- University of Stirling, Stirling, Scotland
- Stirling High School, Stirling, Scotland
- Stirling High School, East London, England
- Stirling Theological College, Carlton, Victoria, Australia
- Stirling School, Stirling, Alberta, Canada, a public school

== Military ==
- Short Stirling, a Second World War British bomber aircraft
- Battle of Stirling (1648), in the Scottish Civil War
- HMAS Stirling, a Royal Australian Navy base

== People ==
- Stirling (surname), including a list of people with the name
- Stirling (given name), a list of people
- Clan Stirling, a Lowland Scottish clan

== Transportation ==
- Stirling Highway, connecting Perth and Fremantle, Western Australia
- Stirling railway station (Scotland) in Stirling
- Stirling railway station, Perth in Perth, Western Australia
- MCV Stirling, a bus body
- GNR Stirling 4-2-2, a locomotive class

== Other uses ==
- Earl of Stirling, an extinct title in the Peerage of Scotland
- Stirling baronets, various baronetcies
- Stirling Energy Systems, an American renewable energy company
- Stirling Iron Works, the first steel producer in the colony of New York
- Stirling Engine, a type of heat engine
- Stirling Castle, Stirling, Scotland
- Stirling (Reading, Pennsylvania), a historic mansion
- Stirling Prize, awarded by the Royal Institute of British Architects

== See also ==
- Sterling (disambiguation)
- Stirling Castle (disambiguation)
- Stirling County (disambiguation)
