= Sterling =

Sterling may refer to:

== Currency ==
- Pound sterling (officially called "sterling"), the currency of the United Kingdom
- The English penny, historically known as the sterling
- Sterling silver, a grade of silver

== Places ==
=== United Kingdom ===
- Stirling, a Scottish city whose alternative historical spelling is Sterling

=== United States ===
- Sterling, Alaska
- Sterling, Colorado
- Sterling Micropolitan Statistical Area, Colorado
- Sterling, Connecticut
- Sterling, Georgia
- Sterling, in Bingham County, Idaho
- Sterling Wildlife Management Area, Idaho
- Sterling, Illinois
- Sterling, Kansas
- Sterling, Massachusetts
- Sterling, Michigan
- Sterling Heights, Michigan
- Sterling State Park, Michigan
- Sterling Center, Minnesota
- Sterling, Missouri
- Sterling, in Madison County, Montana
- Sterling, Nebraska
- Sterling, New York
- Sterling, in Mecklenburg County, North Carolina
- Mount Sterling (Great Smoky Mountains), a mountain on the border between North Carolina and Tennessee
- Sterling, North Dakota
- Sterling, Ohio
- Sterling, Oklahoma
- Sterling, in Woodward Township, Clearfield County, Pennsylvania
- Sterling City, Texas
- Sterling County, Texas
- Sterling, Utah
- Sterling, Virginia
- Sterling, Washington
- Sterling, Polk County, Wisconsin
- Sterling, Vernon County, Wisconsin
- Sterling Township (disambiguation)

== Businesses ==
- Sterling Airlines, a former low-cost Danish airline
- Sterling Armaments Company, based near London, England
- Sterling Bank (Nigeria), a national commercial bank
- Sterling Bicycle Co., a 19th-century American bicycle manufacturer
- Sterling (cigarette), a British cigarette brand
- Sterling Commerce, a former software company
- Sterling Drug (a.k.a. Sterling Products, Inc.), a pharmaceutical company now owned by Bayer
- Sterling Furniture, Scotland's largest furniture retail outlet
- Sterling Industries, a medical device contract manufacturer
- Sterling Jewelers, the largest retail jewelry company in the United States
- Sterling (marque), a British automobile brand, sold in the U.S. from 1987 to 1991
- Sterling Optical
- Sterling Plumbing, a brand of products from Kohler Co.
- Sterling Publishing, a publisher of nonfiction books
- Sterling Software, a (now defunct) company co-founded by Sterling Williams
- Sterling Sports Cars, an American automobile kit company
- Sterling Trucks, a former commercial truck brand in the United States
- Hotel Sterling, a former hotel in Wilkes-Barre, Pennsylvania, United States

== Music ==
- Sterling Records (Sweden), a classical music record label
- Sterling Records (US), noted for being the first to sign Hank Williams
- Music Man Sterling, a bass guitar by Music Man

== Schools ==
- Sterling College (Kansas), Sterling, Kansas
- Sterling College (Vermont), Craftsbury Common, Vermont
- Sterling High School (disambiguation)

== People ==
- Sterling (given name)
- Sterling (surname)

== Fictional characters ==
- Sterling Archer, eponymous protagonist of the animated TV series Archer
- Bruce Sterling (Love of Life), American television soap opera character (1959 to 1980)
- Bruce Sterling, protagonist of the 2003 TV series Mister Sterling
- Roger Sterling, on the TV series Mad Men

== Other uses ==
- Sterling (horse) (1868–1891), a British racehorse and sire
- Sterling (program), a program for generating fractals
- Sterling Plaza, a historic building in Beverly Hills, California
- Sterling submachine gun, produced by the Sterling Armaments Company
- a scuppernong (large muscadine grape, Vitis rotundifolia) cultivar

== See also ==
- Sterling Forest State Park, New York
- Mount Sterling (disambiguation), various communities (and one mountain)
- Stirling (disambiguation)
