= Bruce Sterling (Love of Life) =

American television soap opera character (1959 to 1980)

Bruce Sterling was a fictional character in the now-cancelled American soap opera, Love of Life. He was played by actor Ron Tomme from 1959 to the show's demise in 1980.

== Van's soulmate ==
Bruce was the second husband of heroine Vanessa Dale. He was a teacher at Winfield Academy, a private boys' school in the fictional upstate New York community of Rosehill. Bruce met Van through a mutual friend of theirs named Tom Craythorne, a New York City lawyer, who had befriended Van after she helped him foil a paternity suit that her malevolent sister, Meg, foisted on him. They had fallen in love and married.

A widower with two children, Bruce felt that Vanessa would be a needed mother figure to them. Alan, his son, took to Van almost immediately; as did Bruce's former father-in-law, Henry Carlson. But Henry's wife, Vivian and Bruce's headstrong daughter, Barbara, didn't like the new situation. Vivian thought it heartless that Bruce marry so soon after the death of his first wife, Gaye (Henry and Vivian's daughter). However, the war against Vanessa was mostly on the front of snobby Vivian.

Bruce had his share of trials, especially with Barbara. She and a date went joyriding and almost injured Dr. Tony Vento, a handsome doctor (who was the son of a cleaning woman, Mrs. Vento) that she wanted to marry. Barbara told Van all about it, and then Van, out of concern, told Bruce about it. Barbara was annoyed with Van and hated her steadily since. Barbara did marry Dr. Vento, but he found her completely immature. Not surprisingly, he divorced her.

Henry offered Bruce a job at his paper company, and accepted it, feeling burned out from teaching at Winfield Academy. There was the beginning of marital problems for the Sterlings. Bruce had an affair with his secretary, a woman named Ginny Crandall (Barbara Barrie), who had been the wife of a teacher at Winfield Academy, and that caused Van to move out of the house and in with her stepson in his apartment. He also saved a girl named Sandy Porter from a rapist named Glenn Hamilton (Bert Convy). He also had an affair with Dr. Jennifer Stark (Jennifer Bassey).

A swindler named Guy Latimer tried to bilk Henry out a patent, and Bruce put an end to that scheme. However, he wasn't through with the Latimers. Guy's maverick son, Rick, had married Barbara, against everyone's best interests. The two produced a son, Hank Latimer, named after his great-grandfather, Henry (Barbara's grandfather). Rick, however, found her to be a very immature girl, and divorced her, taking Hank with him. Barbara then left Rosehill, never to return.

Bruce has worn many hats in Rosehill over the years. Besides his teaching career at Winfield Academy and his job at the Carlson Paper Company, he was also a professor at Rosehill University; the editor of the Rosehill newspaper; and also mayor of the city of Rosehill. He was also a private investigator, but despite all his work and the amount of service to his community over the years, not to mention his affairs, his one true love was his wife, Vanessa. Presumably, the Sterlings still live in Rosehill and have retired happily.

== Trivia ==
Ron Tomme originated the role of Bruce. He wooed Vanessa (played by Bonnie Bartlett at that time), right up to the wedding day. When Van actually walked down the aisle, the next day, she was played by Audrey Peters, who stayed with the role until the show's end in 1980. Since Peters had taken over right after Bartlett quit the show, and had no idea who the characters she was interacting with were, or even knew their names, she called everyone at the reception, "dear".
