= Brian Oakley =

British civil servant and industrialist

Brian Wynne Oakley CBE FBCS FInstP
- Born: 10 October 1927
- Died: 17 August 2012 (aged 84)
- Citizenship: United Kingdom
- Education: Exeter College, Oxford
- Occupations: Civil servant Businessman; Information technologist
- Years active: 1950–2000
- Employer(s): Royal Signals; Telecommunications Research Establishment; Government of the UK; Logica
- Organization(s): British Computer Society (President, 1988–1989); Computer Conservation Society (Chair, 1996–2000)
- Known for: Alvey Programme (1983–1987); Helping to save Bletchley Park
- Board member of: Computer Centre, University of London; Logica
- Awards: Commander of the Order of the British Empire; Honorary doctorate, Sheffield Hallam University (1994); Honorary doctorate, University of Essex (1998)

Brian Wynne Oakley, CBE FBCS FInstP (10 October 1927 – 17 August 2012) was a British civil servant and industrialist who took a leading role in the area of information technology, especially the 1980s Alvey Programme.

== Career ==
=== Military service and education ===
In World War II, Oakley served with the Royal Signals as a subaltern. He then studied science at Exeter College, Oxford.

=== Information technology ===
In 1950, Oakley joined the Telecommunications Research Establishment (TRE) where he undertook research in telecommunications and civilian applications of military research. He then worked in Whitehall as a civil servant, joining the Ministry of Technology under the Harold Wilson government in 1969. Subsequently, he became the chief official of the Science and Engineering Research Council (SERC).

Oakley was director of the United Kingdom Alvey Programme (1983–87), a British government-sponsored research programme for projects in the area of information technology, initiated as a reaction to the Japanese Fifth generation computer project. He went on to be chairman of the software company Logica. He chaired the managing board of the Computer Centre of the University of London, a major UK supercomputing centre, and was a director of the European Initiative for Quantum Computing.

From 1988 to 1989, Oakley was president of the British Computer Society. In 1991, on hearing that British Telecom planned to dispose of its site at Bletchley Park for housing, together with Tony Sale, he helped to save the site, establish the Bletchley Park Trust, and became a director of the Trust. He was chairman of the Computer Conservation Society from 1996 to 2000.

== Awards and recognition ==
Oakley was a Commander of the Order of the British Empire (CBE) in the 1981 Birthday Honours. He received honorary doctorates from Sheffield Hallam University (1994) and the University of Essex (1998).
