= KnowledgeBench =

Software suite used in the development of new products

KnowledgeBench is a proprietary software suite which is used in the development of new products such as pharmaceuticals, food and drink, speciality chemicals, paint, oil, and plastics. It has modules to support formulation, management and reporting, expert systems, knowledge management, and Product Lifecycle Management. The software is used by companies including AstraZeneca, GlaxoSmithKline and Wrigley. It is built using methods from the field of artificial intelligence that include rule based systems and case based reasoning.

== History ==
In 2005 KnowledgeBench acquired the rights to the Formulogic Expert Systems Product from Logica. This is an expert system suite originally known as PFES (Product Formulation Expert System) which was developed by Logica under the Government sponsored Alvey Programme in 1989.

The author is KnowledgeBench Ltd, which was founded in August 2003 by Jason Smith, the Chief Executive and Denis Howlett, the Chief Technical Officer and product architect.

== Application details ==
A KnowledgeBench application consists of three parts:

- An underlying knowledgebase containing background information about ingredients, their properties, past formulations, and anything else required by the application
- A collection of rulesets to provide the functionality and decision processing
- A set of web pages to solicit input from the user and display the results and reports

KnowledgeBench is compatible with industry standard Java application server platforms, including Apache Tomcat, IBM WebSphere, Oracle WebLogic Server, Jetty and other Java EE platforms. The web front end can be hosted by the application server or fronted by an Apache web server or Microsoft's IIS web server.
