= Stirling Castle (disambiguation) =

Stirling Castle is a castle in Stirling, Scotland.

Stirling Castle may also refer to:

- HMS Stirling Castle, various Royal Navy ships
- Stirling Castle (ship), several merchant ships
