= James Stirling =

James Stirling may refer to:

- James Stirling (mathematician) (1692–1770), Scottish mathematician
- Sir James Stirling, 1st Baronet (c.1740–1805), Scottish banker and lord provost of Edinburgh
- Sir James Stirling (Royal Navy officer) (1791–1865), British admiral and Governor of Western Australia
- James Stirling (engineer, born 1799) (1799–1876), Scottish engineer
- James Hutchison Stirling (1820–1909), Scottish philosopher
- James Stirling (engineer, born 1835) (1835–1917), Scottish locomotive engineer
- Sir James Stirling (judge) (1836–1916), British jurist
- James Stirling (botanist) (1852–1909), Australian botanist and geologist
- James Stirling (1890s footballer) (fl. 1895–1896), Scottish footballer
- Jimmy Stirling (1925–2006), Scottish footballer
- Sir James Stirling (architect) (1926–1992), architect
- Sir James Stirling of Garden (1930–2024), British Army officer, chartered surveyor and Lord Lieutenant of Stirling and Falkirk
- James Stirling (physicist) (1953–2018), British physicist and Provost of Imperial College London

== See also ==
- James Sterling (disambiguation)
- Stirling (disambiguation)
