= Sterling micropolitan area =

The Sterling micropolitan area may refer to:

- The Sterling, Illinois micropolitan area, United States
- The Sterling, Colorado micropolitan area, United States

== See also ==
- Sterling (disambiguation)
