= James Sterling =

James Sterling may refer to:

- James Sterling (poet) (1701–1763), Church of England clergyman and poet
- James E. Sterling (1838–?), United States Navy sailor and Medal of Honor recipient
- James Stephanie Sterling (fl. from 2006), English-American video game journalist

== See also ==
- James Stirling (disambiguation)
- Sterling (disambiguation)
