= Rick Latimer =

Rick Latimer was a fictional character on the now cancelled American soap opera Love of Life. The role was originated by Paul Savior, but actor Jerry Lacy is best known in the role.

== Catalyst ==
Rick was the maverick son of corporate swindler, Guy Latimer (John Straub). His father was notorious for attempting to steal a non-tearing paper patent from the Carlson Paper Company in the fictional community of Rosehill, New York. His father had been stopped by the paper company's owner, Henry Carlson and his former son in-law Bruce Sterling.

The somewhat scheming, but not so much as his father, Rick had many romances over the years. Notably was his first marriage to the highly immature Barbara Sterling, Bruce's daughter, with whom he had a son, Hank Latimer (named after his mother's grandfather). She convinced him to marry her, and the marriage soured immediately. Despite his somewhat shady character, he did mean well, and he loved Hank very much.

Another romance was with Caroline Aleata, whom he deeply loved. However, while with Cal, he was also romancing her wealthy and vindictive mother, Meg Dale, whom he was working with to secure financing for his country club style resort called Beaver Ridge.

Like his father, he had a head for business, prior to his owning of Beaver Ridge, he owned a business called the Club Victoria, where he was involved with singer, Kate Swanson (Leonie Norton and Sally Stark).

However, he was truly in love with Cal, despite her mother's financing of his compound. He sadly admitted to Cal that he had cheated on her with her mother, and she drove off in a rage at both Rick and her mother. She crashed her car into an embankment which injured her, and Rick was terribly worried about her injuries.

After her stepfather, Eddie, who was the only father she ever knew, arrived in Rosehill (at her Aunt Van's request) to help Cal through this crisis, Rick declared his love for her, and threw Meg's financial backing in her face.

The two, after having dealt with more of Meg's chicanery, decided to leave Rosehill for good, moving to Montreal, Quebec, Canada, taking Hank with them. Cal proved to be a wonderful stepmother to Hank.
