= Sterling (surname) =

Sterling is an English surname. One source attributes this surname to a contraction of Easterling, "a name given to Hanse merchants" and nothing more than a compass point-associated name. A second source suggests that this was a nickname from a Middle English term for coin: sterling.

Notable people with the surname include:

- Aljamain Sterling (born 1989), American mixed martial arts fighter
- Alton Sterling (1979–2016), African-American man fatally shot by police
- Andrew B. Sterling (1874–1955), American lyricist
- Anne Fausto-Sterling (born 1944), American sexologist
- Antoinette Sterling (1850–1904), Anglo-American vocalist
- Barry Sterling (1943–2014), American businessman and politician
- Brett Sterling (born 1984), American ice hockey player
- Bruce Sterling (born 1954), American author, speaker and futurist
- Bruce Foster Sterling (1870–1945), American politician
- Christopher H. Sterling (1943–2023), American professor of media and public affairs
- Claire Sterling (1919-1995), American author and journalist
- Debbie Sterling, founder and CEO of American toy company Goldieblox
- Donald Sterling (born 1934), American businessman, attorney and basketball team owner
- Donnie Sterling, American bassist
- Edward Sterling (1773–1847), British journalist
- Edward Boker Sterling (1851-1925), philatelist of Trenton, New Jersey
- Elizabeth Sterling Haynes (1897–1957), Canadian theatre activist, née Sterling
- Ford Sterling (1883–1939), American actor
- Fred E. Sterling (1869-1934), American politician
- George Sterling (1869–1926), American poet
- Georgie Sterling, Australian actress
- H. J. Sterling (1882–1959), Canadian ice hockey administrator
- James Stephanie Sterling (born 1984), English video game journalist and reviewer
- Jan Sterling (1921–2004), American actress
- Jeffrey Sterling, Baron Sterling of Plaistow (born 1934), British peer and former chairman of P&O
- John Sterling (author) (1806–1844), British author
- John Sterling (pitcher) (1865–1908), American baseball player
- John Sterling (sportscaster) (1938–2026), American radio broadcaster
- John William Sterling (1844–1918), American philanthropist, corporate attorney, and benefactor to Yale University
- Leon Sterling, Australian computer scientist
- Lester Sterling (1936–2023), Jamaican musician
- Linder Sterling (born 1954), British artist
- Mindy Sterling (born 1953), American actress
- Nici Sterling (born 1968), British porn star
- Norm Sterling (born 1942), Canadian politician
- Peter Sterling (born 1940), American neuroscientist
- Peter Sterling (born 1960), Australian rugby league player
- Raheem Sterling (born 1994), English footballer
- Robert Sterling (1917-2006), American actor
- Ross S. Sterling (1875–1949), American politician
- Thomas Sterling (1851–1930), American politician
- Thomas Sterling (computing), American computer scientist
- Tisha Sterling (born 1944), American actress, daughter of Robert Sterling and Ann Sothern
- Wallace Sterling (1906–1985), Canadian-born American university president
- William T. Sterling (1808–1903), American politician

== Fictional Sterlings ==
- Bruce Sterling (Love of Life), American television soap opera character (1959 to 1980)
- Jim Sterling, character on the American TV series Leverage
- Scott Sterling (fictional), soccer/volleyball player from a pair of online viral videos by Studio C.
- Roger Sterling from Mad Men.
- Dana Sterling, fictional character from American TV series RoboTech

== See also ==
- Stirling (surname)
- Starling (name)
