= Starling (disambiguation) =

Starling is a family of birds. The common starling is also colloquially referred to simply as "starling".

Starling may also refer to:

== Places ==
- Starling, Edmonton, Alberta, Canada
- Starling, Greater Manchester, a settlement in the Metropolitan Borough of Bury, England

== Arts, entertainment, and media ==
=== Fictional characters ===
- Starling (DC Comics), a member of the Birds of Prey in DC Comics
- Starling (Marvel Comics), a Marvel Comics character
- Starling, a fictional character in the animated television show Storm Hawks
- Clarice Starling, the heroine of the novel Silence of the Lambs, and of the films The Silence of the Lambs and Hannibal
- Juliet, Cordelia, and Rosalind Starling, from Suda 51's hack-and-slash zombie game Lollipop Chainsaw

=== Music ===
- Starling Arrow, a cappella spirit-folk ensemble
- The Starlings, a 1990s English alternative rock band
- The Starlings, a coloratura soprano duo from the 1930–40s
- The Starlings (duo), a Belgian pop music duo
- "Starlings", a song by No Devotion from the album No Oblivion
- "Starlings", a song by Elbow from the album The Seldom Seen Kid
- "Starlings", a song by Shed Seven from the album A Matter of Time

=== Other arts, entertainment, and media ===
- Starling (film), a 2023 American animated short film by Mitra Shahidi
- Starlings (1988 film), a British television film by Andy Armitage in the anthology series ScreenPlay
- Starlings (TV series), a British comedy drama airing on Sky1
- Jim Starling, a series of novels for children written by Edmund Wallace Hildick
- The Starling, a 2021 American comedy-drama film

== Computing and technology ==
- STARLING, an etymological online database managed by Georgiy Starostin
- Starling Framework, an open source framework for ActionScript development

== Watercraft ==
- Starling (dinghy), a New Zealand sailing dinghy
- HMS Starling, several ships in the British Royal Navy

== People ==
See Starling (name)

== Other uses ==
- Starling (structure), a defensive bulwark surrounding the supports of a bridge
- Starling Bank, commonly referred to as 'Starling'.
- Starling equation, describes the net flow of fluid across a semipermeable membrane
- Armstrong Whitworth Starling, a 1920s British fighter aircraft
- Frank–Starling law of the heart, identified by British physiologist Ernest Starling
