= New Zealand Listener =

New Zealand magazine

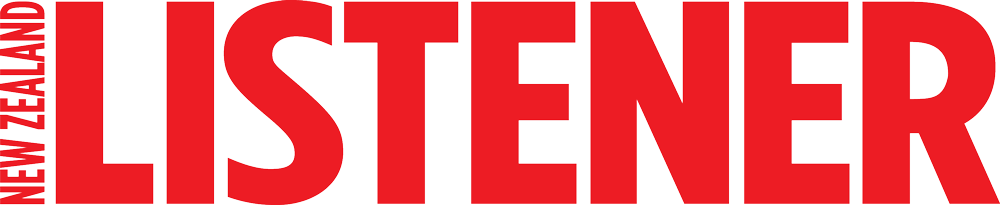
- Editor: Kirsty Cameron
- Categories: Current events
- Frequency: Weekly
- Circulation: 45,262 (April 2017 – March 2018)
- Founded: June 1939; 87 years ago
- Company: Are Media
- Country: New Zealand
- Based in: Auckland
- Website: NZ Listener
- ISSN: 0110-5787

The New Zealand Listener is a weekly magazine that covers the political, cultural and literary life of New Zealand by featuring a variety of topics, including current events, politics, social issues, health, technology, arts, food, culture and entertainment. The Bauer Media Group closed The Listener in April 2020 as a result of the COVID-19 pandemic in New Zealand. In June 2020, Mercury Capital acquired the magazine as part of its purchase of Bauer Media's former Australia and New Zealand assets, which were rebranded as Are Media.

== History ==
The Listener was first published in June 1939 as the Journal of the National Broadcasting Service, a weekly broadcasting guide for radio listeners. The first issue was distributed free to 380,000 households. First edited by Oliver Duff then from June 1949 M. H. Holcroft, it originally had a monopoly on the publication of upcoming television and radio programmes. In the 1980s it lost that monopoly, but despite the increase in competition since that time, it was still one of the top selling magazines in the country. It was privatised in 1990 and was published by Bauer Media Group until the magazine's closure in early 2020.

Pamela Stirling was the editor since 2004, and by 2018 readership was 197,000 with a circulation of 45,262.

From 2004 to 2009, the Listener produced an annual New Zealand Listener Power List of the 50 most powerful people in New Zealand. It also published the Best 100 Books, Best 50 Kids Books, and Best Cookbooks, every November/December.

Notable writers to have had their work published in the Listener include James K. Baxter, Janet Frame and Maurice Shadbolt.

=== Closure and restart, 2020 ===
On 2 April 2020, the Bauer Media Group announced the closing of many of its New Zealand and Australian publications, including The Listener, due to the continued loss of advertising revenue, hastened by the COVID-19 pandemic. Prior to that, the weekly current affairs printed magazine was billed as "New Zealand's best-selling current affairs magazine with a per capita circulation higher than Time, the New Yorker and Spectator".

On 17 June 2020, Australian investment company Mercury Capital purchased The Listener as part of its acquisition of Bauer Media's Australia and New Zealand assets. On 17 July, Mercury Capital announced that it would resume publishing The Listener and other former Bauer publications. In late September 2020, Mercury Capital rebranded Bauer Media as Are Media, which took over publication of The Listener. Publication of The Listener resumed with the issue of 10 October 2020.

On 30 June 2023, Are Media partnered with New Zealand media company NZME to launch a digital subscription version of The Listener called "Listener.co.nz." The website is hosted on The New Zealand Herald's website and also features digital exclusive content.

In June 2025 digitised issues of the Listener from 1939–1959 were made available on Papers Past.

== Editors ==
- Oliver Duff (1939–1949)
- M. H. Holcroft (1949–1967; 1972–1973)
- Alexander MacLeod (1967–1972)
- Ian Cross (1973–1977)
- Tony Reid (1977–1980)
- Peter Stewart (1980–1983; 1987–1989)
- David Beatson (1984–1989)
- Geoff Baylis (1989–1993; Editor-in-chief, CEO)
- Terry Snow (1991–1995)
- Jenny Wheeler (1995–1997)
- Paul Little (1997–1998)
- Finlay Macdonald (1998–2003)
- Pamela Stirling (2004–2021)
- Karyn Scherer (2021–2023)
- Kirsty Cameron (2023–current)

== Regular writers/journalists ==
- Diana Wichtel
- Donna Chisholm
- Bill Ralston
- Nicky Pellegrino
- Bruce Ansley
- Sally Blundell
- Paul Thomas (writer)
- Jane Clifton
- Russell Baillie, Books & Culture Editor
- Fiona Rae
- Michael Cooper
- Clare de Lore
- Peter Griffin
- Marc Wilson, psychology columnist
- Paul Thomas, sports columnist
- Jennifer Bowden
- Greg Dixon
- Michele Hewitson
- Mark Broatch
- Rose McIver
- Andrew Anthony
- Sam Neill
- Louise Chunn
- Cathrin Schaer
- Bernard Lagan
- Charlotte Grimshaw

== Regular cartoonists/illustrators/photographers ==
- Chris Slane (cartoonist)
- Anthony Ellison (cartoonist)
- Andrew Tristram (cartoonist)
- Jane Ussher (photographer)
- Ken Downie (photographer)
- Simon Young (photographer)
- Hagen Hopkins (photographer)

== See also ==
- Media in New Zealand
- List of print media in New Zealand
