= John Sterling =

John Sterling may refer to:

== Sports ==
- John Sterling (American football) (born 1964), American football player
- John Sterling (pitcher) (1865–1908), American baseball pitcher
- John Sterling (sportscaster) (1938–2026), American radio announcer for the New York Yankees

== Others ==
- John Sterling (author) (1806–1844), British author, subject of a life by Thomas Carlyle
- John Barton Sterling (1840–1926), commander of the Coldstream Guards
- John Allen Sterling (1857–1918), American politician from Illinois
- John Whelan Sterling (1816–1885), professor and administrator at the University of Wisconsin
- John William Sterling (1844–1918), philanthropist, major benefactor to Yale University
- John T. Sterling (1841–1920), Union Army soldier and Medal of Honor recipient
- John E. Sterling Jr. (born 1953), U.S. Army general

== See also ==
- John Stirling (disambiguation)
- H. J. Sterling (Harry John Sterling; 1882–1959), Canadian ice hockey administrator
