= Stirling Castle (ship) =

Several ships have been named Stirling Castle for Stirling Castle in Scotland:

- Stirling Castle (1801 ship) was launched at Calcutta. A French privateer captured her in September or October 1804 while Stirling Castle was on passage from Calcutta to Colombo, and took her to Mauritius. She was sold to Arab merchants and later lost.
- Stirling Castle (1829 brig), a vessel that ran aground off the coast of Australia in 1836.
- SS Stirling Castle, a steamship built at Glasgow in 1882; later renamed SS Nord America as a passenger and cargo line. Scrapped in 1911.
- MV Stirling Castle, a liner built in Belfast in 1935 and scrapped in 1966

== See also ==
- HMS Stirling Castle – one of six vessels of that name that served the British Royal Navy
- Stirling (1812 ship), (or Sterling, or Starling) was built at Montreal, Quebec. She apparently traded out of Liverpool as a West Indiaman. There is little evidence that she traded as an East Indiaman. She was last listed in 1821 and a vessel named Sterling, sailing out of Quebec, was wrecked in November 1821.
