= Vanessa Dale =

Lead heroin in former American soap opera Love of Life

Vanessa "Van" Dale Raven Sterling is the main character and the lead heroine in the now-defunct American soap opera Love of Life. She was originally played by Peggy McCay (1951–1955); then by actress Bonnie Bartlett (1955–1959) and Audrey Peters played Vanessa to the show's end.

== The Good Sister ==
Vanessa, or "Van" as she was more commonly called, was the older of the two daughters born to Will and Sarah Dale in the fictional community of Barrowsville, New York. She was considered to be the "good" sister, always thinking of others; whereas her sister, self-centered Meg Dale was thought of as the "bad" sister, always putting herself first. She also believed in being proper to those who she encountered every day. After her father died, Van made frequent trips back to her hometown from New York City, where she had moved, to keep her widowed mother updated on what her sister was up to. Despite her sister's villainous nature, she really did love Meg; and although she didn't often show it, Meg too loved Van.

Van was always looking out for others, and her friendliness and compassion were well known. She was an art school graduate and worked at a television show advertising agency, all the while keeping an eye on her selfish sister and giving her nephew, Ben "Beanie" Harper the love his mother denied him. At first, she had a roommate named Ellie Crown (Hildy Parks).

She was also known for being the type of person who made friends out of enemies. A woman named Tammy Forrest (Scottie McGregor; Ann Loring) hated her for replacing her on a show she once hosted, but eventually grew to like her, because Van helped her kick her drinking habit that got her fired from her job in the first place.

Unlike her capricious and amoral sister, who went from her marriage to one corrupt individual to another, she took her relationships very seriously and with utmost care. She met her first husband, former FBI agent turned attorney Paul Raven, after he helped her sister get acquitted on a murder charge. It came out that he had been married before, although he hadn't told Van. His first wife, Judith, was crazy; and his daughter, Carol, was a deaf-mute after witnessing a horrible crime.

When Judith, was found dead in the charred remains of Sarah's house, it was thought that Van had killed her. Paul and attorney Evans Baker, who had helped acquit Meg in her own murder trial, again teamed up to help defend her; and it came out in court that his own brother, who despised Judith because she ruined his reputation in their hometown of Marlton, had killed her.

Carol, who had been planned on being adopted by Paul and Van, had returned to her original hometown with his loving and supportive mother, Althea, who adored Van and did everything possible to keep Judith out of her son's new marriage. (Althea was played by actress Joanna Roos, who would later on play the role of Van's own mother, Sarah.)

Paul and Van then married and were happy. When his sister in-law, Meg, needed help getting her fortune back from her scheming husband, Jack Andrews, he went, with the best intentions in mind, and flew down to Mexico to deal with him. En route, the plane crashed and Paul was presumed dead. Now, Van had to help support her now widowed and poorer sister and nephew, which she did with characteristic strength.

Meg then left with her son for parts unknown, after an attempt to foist a paternity suit on someone had failed, and a lawyer named Tom Craythorne, the intended victim of Meg's failed paternity suit, had taken a liking to Meg's kinder sister. He introduced her to a friend of his, Bruce Sterling, a teacher at a boys' school called Winfield Academy in the fictional Upstate community of Rosehill, New York. Van moved from New York City to Rosehill to be with Bruce.

Bruce was a widower with two children of his own, Alan and Barbara. Alan got to like Van, as she was the mother figure he needed, as did his maternal grandfather, Henry Carlson; but Alan's sister and his grandmother, Vivian Carlson, didn't like her at all. Vivian had spoiled both Alan and Barbara, (her daughter, Gaye, was Bruce's first wife) and thought it awful that Bruce should remarry so soon after her death. (She had recently died in a car accident.) Vivian, who was quite snobby, had erected a shrine to Gaye.

Barbara had no liking for Van after she told her husband that she was going to elope with Dr. Tony Vento, a doctor whom she and a date she was joyriding with, almost ran over. In fact, with Barbara, Van's advice fell on deaf ears.

However, Vivian eventually found out that her "sainted" daughter was nothing of the kind. She had had an illicit affair with the headmaster of Winfield Academy, the school that Bruce taught at; and it was proven that he was the father of Alan. Van had found out and was considerate in keeping the information secret, but the headmaster wasn't that nice.

He had been feuding with Bruce and blabbed it that he was the father of Alan. Henry and Vivian found out all about it. They were both hurt, but Vivian was so shocked, that she fell apart emotionally. Van stayed with her, assuring her that things would be fine. Vivian was forever grateful for her support, despite all that she had done to her; and the two women became friends.

Van was also known for being a woman of such character and calibre that a dying woman would ask her to marry her husband after she was gone. A woman named Maggie Porter (Joan Copeland) had asked Van that very thing. She was dying of cancer, and knew of Van's problems with Bruce, but she knew of her character, and attempted to match her husband, Link, with her. She and Bruce had split up and she was staying with her stepson, Alan, in his apartment. Link eventually married Van's old friend, Tammy Forrest, and were happy, despite Maggie's conniving twin sister, Kay (also played by Joan Copeland, this time wearing a blond wig), showing up. After Kay gave up her claim on her ex-brother in-law, Link and Tammy were stable until he died.

Once or twice, Van had been impersonated by nasty women. When their neighbor, Nell Saltzman was having an affair with a man named Jason Ferris (Robert Alda), his wife, Sharon (Eileen Letchworth) had thought that it was Van having the affair, (which would have been out of character for her); however, it was maniacal Nell, who was dressed in a wig to make her look like Van who had the affair, and nearly broke up the Ferris marriage. The Ferrises left Rosehill, and then Nell left too.

By then, Van and Bruce had gained new neighbors and best friends in Charles Lamont (Jonathan Russell) and his wife, Diana (Diane Rousseau). Charles owned a bookstore in Rosehill and Diana was a social psychologist. Much later, though, Charles would divorce Diana, and both moved on. Diana with assistant district attorney, Jamie Rollins (Ray Wise) and then when that relationship failed, she went into a convent, realizing that religion would give her the comfort that marriage couldn't; and Charles married a woman named Felicia Flemming (Pamela Lincoln), who was his grandson Johnny Prentiss's schoolteacher. (Johnny's parents were Bill Prentiss and Tess Krakauer, who were played by real-life husband and wife, Gene Bua and Toni Bull Bua) They were married, despite Felicia's fear of sexual relations; until she died. Charles then left Rosehill.

The Sterlings had split up quite a number of times, due to infidelities, mainly on Bruce's part, but always ended back up together. They were truly soul mates. Even the sudden reappearance of her first husband, Paul Raven, (going by a new name "Matt Corby" and a new face) couldn't really sunder them.

However, while under his new identity, he killed his then-wife, Evelyn Corby, and went to prison for it; during a prison riot he was arbitrating, he did die, this time for real. Paul and Evelyn's daughter, Stacey Corby, stayed with Van and Bruce.

When her mother, Sarah, (who had left Barrowsville, many years previous) was in the hospital because of a brain abscess and almost near death herself, (she had lost her second husband, Alex Caldwell, Rosehill's pharmacist) she asked for her other daughter, Meg, who had been absent for almost seventeen years.

Van and Bruce did some investigating and found that she had been married since Van had last seen her. She had last been married to someone named Edouard Aleata, and then Van wrote her a letter asking her to come back to Rosehill to see her mother. The letter, meant for Meg, was intercepted by Van's until that time, unknown niece, Cal Aleata, who was like her half-brother, Ben, in that she had been denied love by her mother.

Bruce, Sarah and Van welcomed Cal with open arms, giving the lonely girl the love that she had craved and sorely needed.

Not long after Cal moved to Rosehill, Meg did come back, and sadly, she was the same as she was before, amoral and always lusting after attractive shady men, much like the old days. Again, she and Van were battling each other over morals. Meg's final husband, crooked mayor Jeff Hart, had tried to eliminate Van, as well as Cal, many times, but failed.

Van and Bruce remained together, despite all their trials, and no matter what, they were inseparable. They moved into a new house, which had been owned by a professor Timothy McCauley (Sheppherd Strudwick), and he stayed on and married Van's mother, Sarah. McCauley worked at Rosehill University, where Bruce went back to teaching, some years after he had left Winfield Academy.

It is presumed to say that Van and Bruce still remained together and to this day, are still living in Rosehill.

== Trivia ==
Bonnie Bartlett played Vanessa through her wedding day to Bruce Sterling. When she marched down the aisle, she was played by actress Audrey Peters. Since she was so new to the show and didn't know all the characters names that she would be interacting with, she called everyone, "dear", at the reception. Of all three actresses who played Van, Audrey Peters was most identified with her, as she played her for twenty one years, until the show's end in 1980.
