= John Stirling =

John Stirling may refer to:

- John Stirling (principal) (1654–1727), Scottish minister
- John Stirling (Lord Provost) (1677–1736), Scottish merchant
- Jock Stirling (1887–1924), Scottish footballer
- Sir John Lancelot Stirling (1849–1932), Australian politician
- John Stirling (police officer), Chief Constable of Great Grimsby, 1900–1930
- Sir John Stirling (Scottish politician) (1893–1975), Scottish soldier and politician
- John Stirling (New South Wales politician), Australian politician
- John Bertram Stirling (1888–1988), Canadian engineer and businessmen
- John Stirling, Linlithgow Pursuivant in the Court of the Lord Lyon, Scotland
- John Stirling of Kippendavie (1742-1816), Scottish landowner and father of Jane Stirling

== See also ==
- John Sterling (disambiguation)
- Sir John Stirling-Maxwell, 10th Baronet (1866–1956), Scottish politician and philanthropist
