= Ubique (company) =

Israeli software company

- Company type: Startup
- Industry: Social media
- Founded: 1994 in Rehovot, Israel
- Founder: Ehud Shapiro, Avner Shafrir
- Fate: Acquired by AOL in 1995, then by IBM in 1998
- Headquarters: Rehovot, Israel
- Key people: Ehud Shapiro, Avner Shafrir
- Products: Virtual Places
- Services: Instant messaging
- Parent: IBM

Ubique was an Israeli software company that produced social-networking and messaging software. Founded in 1994, Ubique is notable for launching the first social-networking software, which included features such as instant messaging, voice over IP (VoIP), chat rooms, web-based events, and collaborative browsing.

The company is best known for its most prominent product, Virtual Places, a presence-based chat program that allowed users to explore websites together. This software required both server and client components, enabling users to overlay avatars onto their web browsers and collaborate in real-time as they visited websites. Virtual Places was utilized by providers such as VPChat and Digital Space and eventually evolved into Lotus Sametime. Despite advancements and changes, some consumer-oriented communities still use older versions of Virtual Places.

The company's technology laid the foundation for the development of a sophisticated instant messaging and presence platform, which culminated in the creation of Lotus Sametime. Ubique's mission from its inception was "to add people to the web," transforming the early static web into a dynamic, interactive environment.

In 1995, America Online (AOL) acquired Ubique with the aim of enhancing its online interactive communication services. However, after the discontinuation of GNN in 1996, Ubique shifted its focus from consumer markets to corporate presence technology and instant messaging. In 1998, Ubique was acquired by Lotus/IBM to integrate its technology into Lotus products. By 2006, elements of Ubique were incorporated into IBM Haifa Labs, which continued to develop real-time collaboration technologies.

== History ==
Ubique Ltd was founded in 1994 in Israel by Ehud Shapiro and a group of scientists from the Weizmann Institute to develop real-time, distributed computing products. The company developed a presence-based chat system known as Virtual Places along with real-time instant messaging and presence technology software. These were the very early days of the web, which at the time had only static data. Ubique's mission was "to add people to the web".

In 1995, America Online Inc. purchased Ubique for $14.5 million with the intention to use Ubique's Virtual Places technology to enhance and expand its existing live online interactive communication for both the AOL consumer online service and the new Global Network Navigator (GNN) brand service. Only the GNN-branded Virtual Places product was ever released.

In 1996, GNN was discontinued in 1996. Ubique's management, with the support of AOL, decided to look for other markets for Virtual Places technology. The outcome was that Ubique shifted Virtual Places from the consumer market to focus on presence technology and instant messaging for the corporate market. AOL divested Ubique but remained as a principal investor while Ubique sought a new owner.

In 1998, Ubique was acquired by Lotus/IBM to integrate the core technology of instant messaging and presence functions into a software product integrated with Lotus/IBM.

In 2000, Lotus announced Lotus Sametime using Ubique's technology.

In 2006, Elements of Ubique along with other Israeli-based companies were integrated into the newly created IBM Haifa Labs. The Lab develops Session Initiation Protocol (SIP) infrastructure and features of real-time collaboration, including session management, presence awareness, subscriptions and notifications, text messaging, developer toolkits, and mobile real-time messaging infrastructure.

== Technology ==
=== Virtual Places ===
Ubique's best-known product is Virtual Places, a presence-based chat program in which users explore web sites together. It is used by providers such as VPChat and Digital Space and eventually evolved into Lotus Sametime.

Virtual Places requires a server and client software. Users start Virtual Places along with a web browser and sign into the Virtual Places server. Avatars are overlaid onto the web browser and users are able to collaborate with each other while they all visit web sites in real time.

Some Virtual Places consumer-oriented communities are still alive on the Web and are using the old version of it.

=== Instant Messaging and Chat ===
With the technology developed for Virtual Places, Ubique created an instant messaging and presence technology platform which evolved into Lotus Sametime.
