= Stirling County =

Stirling County may refer to:

- Stirling County RFC, Scottish rugby club
- Stirling County, Western Australia
- County of Stirling, i.e. Stirlingshire, Scotland

== See also ==
- Sterling County, Texas
