= Sterling Congregational Church =

Historic church in Minnesota, United States

- U.S. National Register of Historic Places
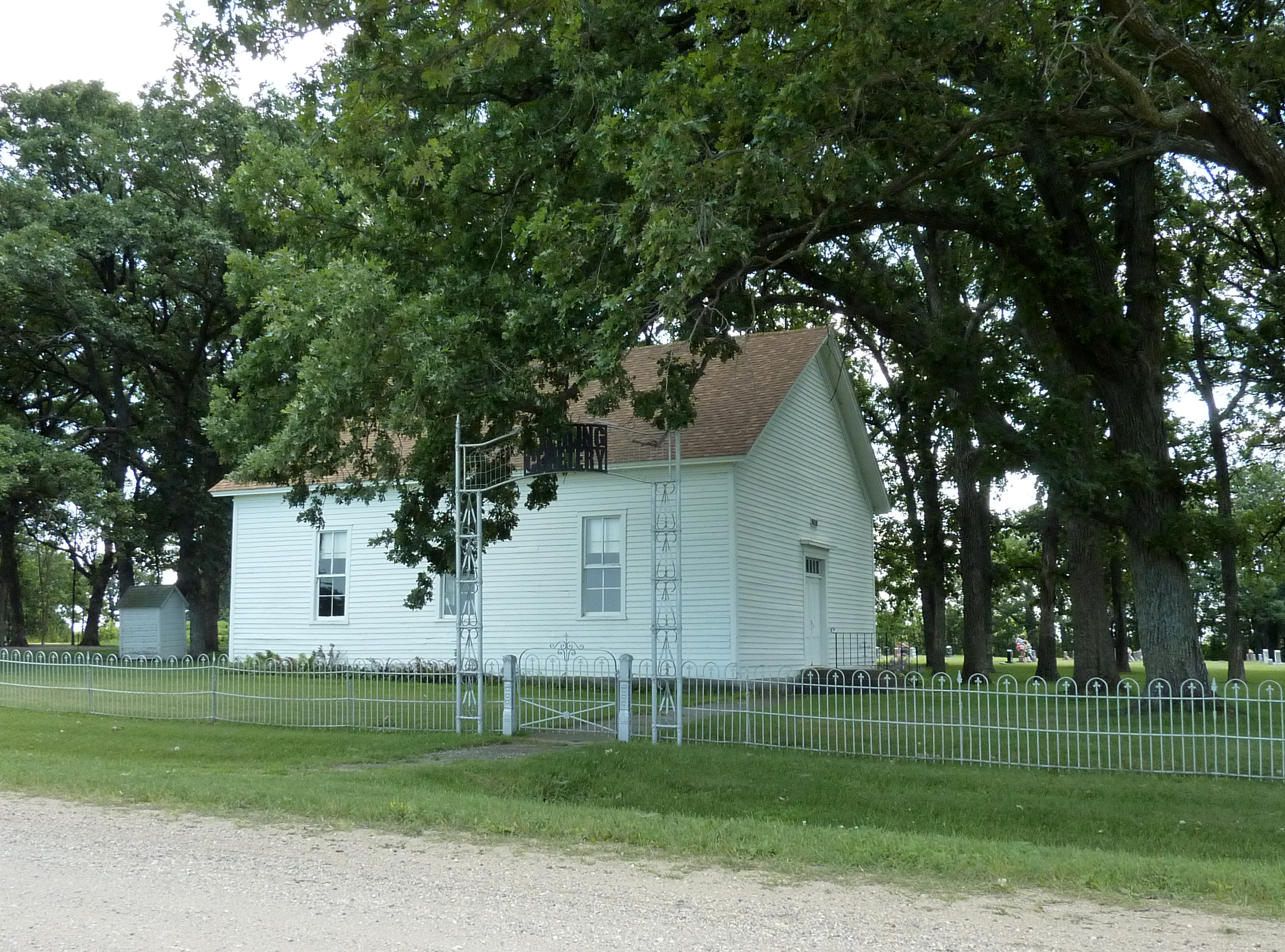

- Location within Minnesota Location within the United States
- Location: County Road 151, Sterling Township, Minnesota
- Nearest city: Amboy, Minnesota
- Coordinates: 43°53′55″N 94°3′25″W
- Area: 1.5 acres (0.61 ha)
- Built: 1867
- MPS: Blue Earth County MRA
- NRHP reference No.: 80001958
- Added to NRHP: July 28, 1980

Sterling Congregational Church is a historic church in Sterling Township, Blue Earth County, Minnesota, United States, built in 1867. It was listed on the National Register of Historic Places in 1980. It was nominated for being a rare surviving example of rural community buildings from the settlement era prior to the county's first railroad.
