= Sterling Township =

Sterling Township may refer to:

- Sterling Township, Whiteside County, Illinois
- Sterling Township, Crawford County, Indiana
- Sterling Township, Hodgeman County, Kansas
- Sterling Township, Rice County, Kansas
- Sterling Township, Michigan, now Sterling Heights
- Sterling Township, Blue Earth County, Minnesota
- Sterling Township, Brown County, Ohio
- Sterling Township, Pennsylvania
