= Jerry Lacy =

American actor

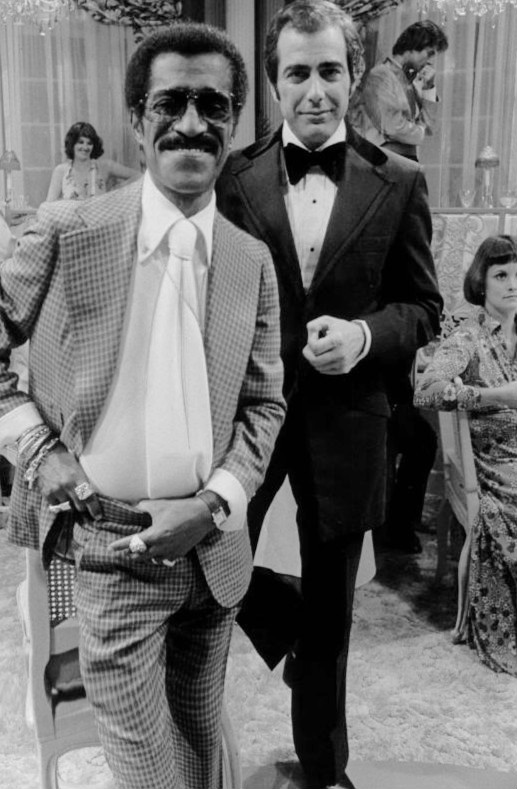
- Lacy as Rick Latimer on the set of Love of Life with guest star Sammy Davis Jr., 1975
- Born: March 27, 1936 (age 89); Sioux City, Iowa, U.S.
- Occupations: Actor, writer
- Years active: 1967–present
- Spouse: Julia Duffy (m. 1984)
- Children: 2

Gerald LeRoy Lacy (born March 27, 1936) is an American actor and writer best known for playing the roles of Tony Peterson, Reverend Trask, Reverend Gregory Trask, Mr. Trask, and Lamar Trask on the TV serial Dark Shadows. He has also appeared on The Secret Storm, As the World Turns (as Simon Gilbey), Love of Life (as Rick Latimer), and The Young and the Restless (as Jonas).

== Life and career ==
Jerry Lacy was born in Sioux City, Iowa. He played Humphrey Bogart in both the Broadway show and film version of Woody Allen's Play It Again, Sam. In 1967, Lacy met future Dark Shadows co-stars Nancy Barrett and David Ford while working at the Wayside Theatre. During the 1970s Lacy appeared in the films House of Dark Shadows, The Money, and Blood Bath. His other film roles include The Big G and Imps*, as well as the TV films Pleasure Cove, Fighting Back, and Chiller. Lacy was offered the role of Rev. Trask in the second film based on Dark Shadows, Night of Dark Shadows, but at the time he was under contract with As the World Turns and his schedule on the show was too heavy for him to shoot the film.

He has been married to actress Julia Duffy since 1984. The couple met when they were both appearing on the CBS soap opera Love of Life. In the 1990s he appeared with his wife on the series Designing Women, as her character Allison Sugarbaker's ex-fiancé, Barry Binsford, who dumped her at the altar; and in 2006, in an episode of Drake & Josh, he appeared as Duffy's character Alice's husband Mr. Hayfer. He also wrote one of the episodes of Duffy's other comedy series, Newhart.

In the summer of 1970, Lacy was a regular on the CBS summer replacement series, Comedy Tonight, and later a similar show, 20th Century Follies. He has guest-starred in a number of primetime shows, including McCloud, Eight is Enough, The White Shadow, Knots Landing, Hardball, and Saved by the Bell.

Lacy returned to the role of Gregory Trask in the Dark Shadows audio dramas The Wicked and the Dead (2009) and Kingdom of the Dead (2010). In mid-2010, Lacy sat for an exclusive interview with freelance writer (and Dark Shadows fan) Rod Labbe. Entitled "Saints and Sinners", it ran in the September 2010 edition of Fangoria magazine. Labbe and Lacy collaborated again on a lengthier interview for Scary Monsters Magazine. The issue, #90, was released in December 2013, and the interview is entitled "Right for the Part". Also in 2013, Lacy reunited with his Dark Shadows costars Lara Parker and Kathryn Leigh Scott for the feature film Doctor Mabuse, written and directed by Ansel Faraj. Lacy starred as the titular Dr. Mabuse, reprising his role in Doctor Mabuse: Etiopomar, released in 2014.

== Personal life ==
Lacy married actress Julia Duffy in 1984. In 1986, they had their first child, a daughter, Kerry. In August 1989, Duffy gave birth to their second child, a son, Daniel. Daniel died by suicide in April 2019.
