= Doctor in a cell =

Doctor in a cell is an advanced biotechnology concept introduced in 1998 by Ehud Shapiro of the Weizmann Institute. It envisions autonomous, programmable molecular devices within the human body performing diagnostic and therapeutic functions. The initial design proposed molecular Turing machines capable of replacing traditional drugs with "smart drugs" composed of molecular computing devices programmed with medical knowledge to analyze their environment and release appropriate treatments.

To realize this vision, Shapiro and colleague Kobi Benenson developed molecular implementations at the Weizmann Institute. These included a programmable autonomous automaton with DNA-encoded input and transition rules, and a stochastic automaton that interacts with its environment to release drug molecules in response to cancer markers.

In 2009, Shapiro and PhD student Tom Ran created a prototype molecular system capable of simple logical deductions using DNA strands. This system represented the first molecular-scale implementation of a simple programming language, demonstrating potential for precise targeting and treatment of specific cell types by performing millions of calculations simultaneously.

Further advancements aimed to make DNA computing devices accessible through a compiler bridging high-level programming languages with DNA computing code. Shapiro and Ran also developed a genetic device operating within bacterial cells to identify transcription factors and produce visible markers or therapeutic proteins.

== Initial work ==
The concept was first presented in 1998 by Ehud Shapiro from the Weizmann Institute as a conceptual design for an autonomous, programmable molecular Turing machine, realized at the time as a mechanical device, and a vision of how such machines can cause a revolution in medicine.

The vision suggested that smart drugs, made of autonomous molecular computing devices, programmed with medical knowledge, could supplant present day drugs by analyzing the molecular state of their environment (input) based on programmed medical knowledge (program), and if deemed necessary release a drug molecule in response (output).

== First steps towards realization of the vision ==
To realize this vision, Shapiro set a wet lab at Weizmann and was joined by Kobi Benenson. Within a few years Benenson, Shapiro and colleagues have made steps towards realizing this vision: (1) A molecular implementation of a programmable autonomous automaton in which the input was encoded as a DNA molecule, “software” (automaton transition rules) was encoded by short DNA molecules and the “hardware” was made of made DNA processing enzymes. (2) A simplified implementation of an automaton in which the DNA input molecule is used as fuel (3) A stochastic molecular automata in which transition probabilities can be programmed by varying the concentration of “software” molecules, specifically the relative concentrations of molecules encoding competing transition rules. And (4) Extending the stochastic automaton with input and output mechanisms, allowing it to interact with the environment in a pre-programmed way, and release a specific drug molecule for cancer upon detecting expression levels of mRNA characteristic of a specific cancer. These biomolecular computers were demonstrated in a test tube, wherein a number of cancer markers were pre-mixed to emulate different marker combinations. Biomolecular computers identified the presence of cancer markers (Simultaneously and independently identifying small-cell lung cancer markers and prostate cancer markers). The computer can then diagnose the type of cancer and release the drug needed.

== DNA computers capable of simple logical deductions ==
In 2009, Shapiro and PhD student Tom Ran presented the prototype of an autonomous programmable molecular system, based on the manipulation of DNA strands, which is capable of performing simple logical deductions. This prototype is the first simple programming language implemented on molecular-scale. Introduced into the body, this system has immense potential to accurately target specific cell types and administer the appropriate treatment, as it can perform millions of calculations at the same time and ‘think’ logically. Prof Shapiro's team aims to make these computers perform highly complex actions and answer complicated questions, following a logical model first proposed by Aristotle over 2000 years ago. The biomolecular computers are extremely small: three trillion computers can fit into a single drop of water. If the computers were given the rule ‘All men are mortal’ and the fact ‘Socrates is a man’, they would answer ‘Socrates is mortal’. Multiple rules and facts were tested by the team and the biomolecular computers answered them correctly each time.

== ‘User-friendly’ DNA computers ==
The team has also found a way to make these microscopic computing devices ‘user-friendly’ by creating a compiler – a program for bridging between a high-level computer programming language and DNA computing code. They sought to develop a hybrid in silico/in vitro system that supports the creation and execution of molecular logic programs in a similar way to electronic computers, enabling anyone who knows how to operate an electronic computer, with absolutely no background in molecular biology, to operate a biomolecular computer.

== DNA computers via computing bacteria ==
In 2012, Prof. Ehud Shapiro and Dr. Tom Ran have succeeded in creating a genetic device that operates independently in bacterial cells. The device has been programmed to identify certain parameters and mount an appropriate response. The computer tries to identify transcription factors - proteins that determine the expression of genes in the cell. If these molecules don't work correctly, it can interfere with gene expression. In cancer cells, for example, the transcription factors regulating cell growth and division do not function properly, leading to increased cell division and the formation of a tumor. The device can thus analyze a DNA sequence to diagnosis cancer. In follow-up research, the scientists plan to replace the light-emitting protein with one that will affect the cell's fate, for example, a protein that can cause the cell to commit suicide. In this manner, the device will cause only "positively" diagnosed cells to self-destruct. Following the success of the study in bacterial cells, the researchers are planning to test ways of recruiting such bacteria as an efficient system to be conveniently inserted into the human body for medical purposes (which shouldn't be problematic given our natural Microbiome; recent research reveals there are already 10 times more bacterial cells in the human body than human cells, that share our body space in a symbiotic fashion). Yet another research goal is to operate a similar system inside human cells, which are much more complex than bacteria.
