= Audrey Peters =

American actress (1927–2019)

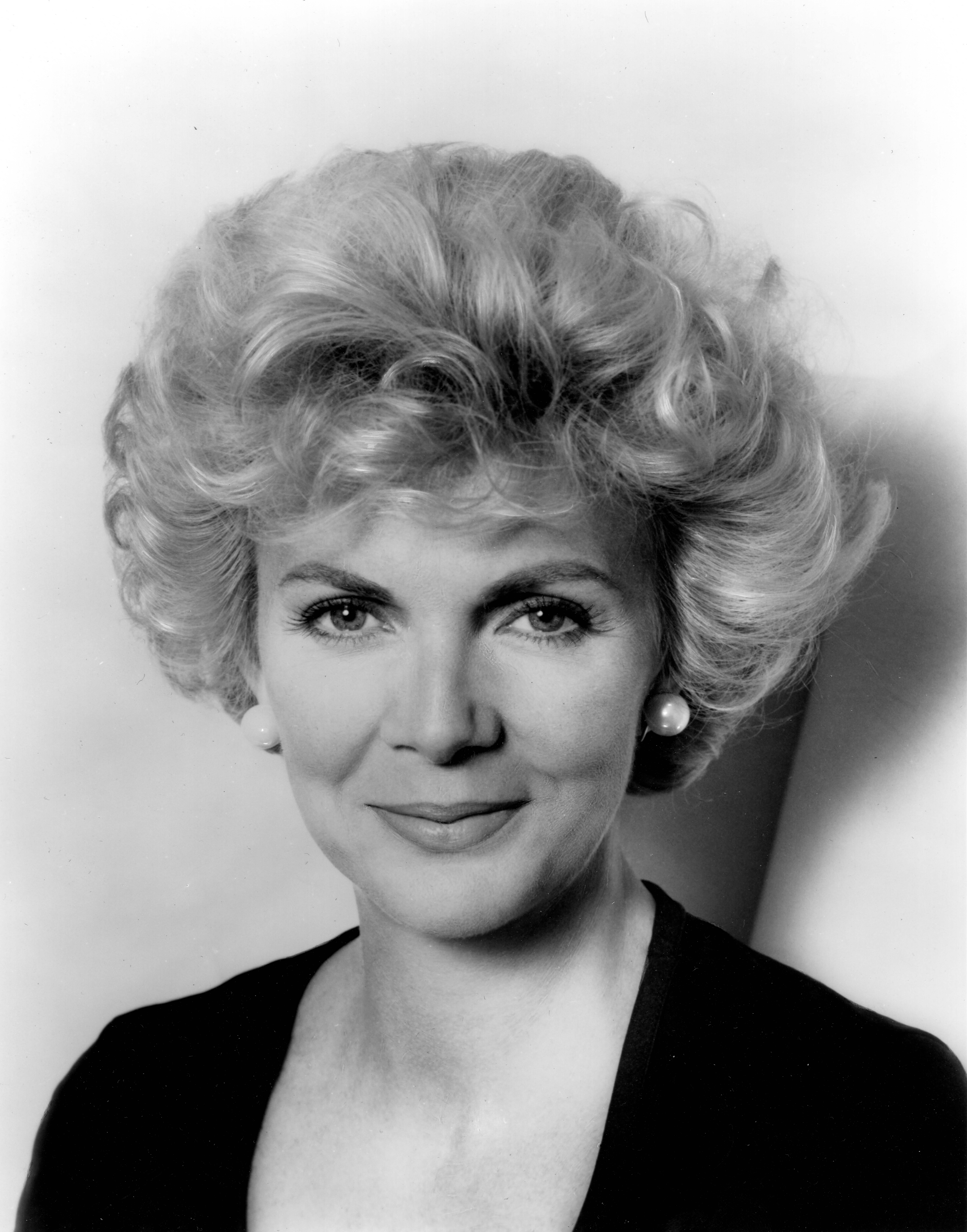
Audrey Peters (1980)

Audrey Peters (February 11, 1927 - August 2, 2019) was an American actress.

== Career ==
Peters was best known for her 21-year run as Vanessa Dale Sterling on the CBS daytime soap opera Love of Life. Peters was the third actress to play the role (after daytime veteran Peggy McCay and actress Bonnie Bartlett), but she became the actress most identified with the role. Her run as Vanessa ended when the show was cancelled in 1980.

Seven years later, she was cast as Sarah Shayne, the mother of Reva Shayne, on another CBS soap, Guiding Light. Peters was on contract with the show for four years, and returned for Christmas episodes in 1993. The character of Sarah died in 1997 (offscreen), but Peters made several additional appearances before the show's end in 2009, appearing as Sarah's spirit to guide Reva during times of trouble.

Peters made several other appearances on daytime television, including brief appearances on Search for Tomorrow, Loving, and All My Children. Early in her career, Peters was cast in several plays on the Broadway stage. She was a dancer on The Toast of the Town until an injury ended her dancing career.

Peters died on August 2, 2019, at age 92 in Los Angeles, California.
