= Sterling (given name) =

Sterling is a given name from the Old English staerling, referring to the bird, starling; two variants of the name are Starling and Stirling.

Notable people with the name include:

- Sterling Archer, fictional character from Archer
- Sterling Foster Black (1924–1996), American lawyer
- Sterling K. Brown (born 1976), American actor
- W. Sterling Cary (1927–2021), American Christian minister
- Sterling R. Cockrill (born 1925), American politician
- Sterling R. Cockrill (judge) (1847–1901), chief justice of the Arkansas Supreme Court
- Sterling Dietz (born 1991), American magician
- Sterling Hayden (1916–1986), American actor and author
- Sterling Hitchcock (born 1971), American Major League Baseball pitcher
- Sterling Hofrichter (born 1996), American football player
- Sterling Holloway (1905–1992), American actor
- Sterling Hyltin (born 1985), American ballet dancer
- Sterling Jerins (born 2004), American actress
- Sterling Knight (born 1989), American actor
- Sterling Lord (1922–2022), American literary agent, editor, and author
- Sterling Marlin (born 1957), American retired NASCAR Driver and Daytona 500 champion
- Sterling Moore (born 1990), American football player
- Sterling Morrison (1942–1995), American guitar player with The Velvet Underground
- Sterling Sharpe (born 1965), American National Football League wide receiver
- Sterling Shepard (born 1993), American National Football League wide receiver
- Sterling Simms (born 1982), American singer on Def Jam
- Sterling Slaughter (born 1941), American Major League Baseball pitcher in 1964
- Sterling Tucker (1923–2019), American politician
- Sterling Van Wagenen (born 1947), American film producer and co-founder of the Sundance Film Festival
- Sterling Weatherford (born 1999), American football player

== See also ==
- Stirling (given name)
- Starling (name)
