= Stirling (given name) =

Stirling is a usually masculine given name which may refer to:

- Stirling Colgate (1925–2013), American physicist at Los Alamos National Laboratory
- Stirling Fessenden (1875–1944), Chairman of the Shanghai Municipal Council
- Stirling Gallacher (born 1970), English actress
- Stirling Hinchliffe (born 1970), Australian politician
- Stirling Mortlock (born 1977), Australian former professional rugby player
- Stirling Moss (1929–2020), English race car driver
- Stirling Silliphant (1918–1996), American screenwriter and producer

== See also ==
- Sterling (given name)
