= Fifth Generation Computer Systems =

1982 Japanese initiative to develop advanced computers

The Fifth Generation Computer Systems (FGCS; Japanese: 第五世代コンピュータ, romanized: daigosedai konpyūta) was a 10-year initiative launched in 1982 by Japan's Ministry of International Trade and Industry (MITI) to develop computers based on massively parallel computing and logic programming. The project aimed to create an "epoch-making computer" with supercomputer-like performance and to establish a platform for future advancements in artificial intelligence. Although FGCS was noted as ahead of its time, and its ambitious goals contributed significantly to the development of concurrent logic programming, it ultimately ended in commercial failure.

The term "fifth generation" was chosen to emphasize the system's advanced nature. In the history of computing hardware, there had been four prior "generations" of computers: the first generation utilized vacuum tubes; the second, transistors and diodes; the third, integrated circuits; and the fourth, microprocessors. While earlier generations focused on increasing the number of logic elements within a single CPU, it was widely believed at the time that the fifth generation would achieve enhanced performance through the use of massive numbers of CPUs.

== Background ==
In the late 1960s until the early 1970s, there was much talk about "generations" of computer hardware, then usually organized into three generations

1. First generation: Thermionic vacuum tubes. Mid-1940s. IBM pioneered the arrangement of vacuum tubes in pluggable modules. The IBM 650 was a first-generation computer.
2. Second generation: Transistors. 1956. The era of miniaturization begins. Transistors are much smaller than vacuum tubes, draw less power, and generate less heat. Discrete transistors are soldered to circuit boards, with interconnections accomplished by stencil-screened conductive patterns on the reverse side. The IBM 7090 was a second-generation computer.
3. Third generation: Integrated circuits (silicon chips containing multiple transistors). 1964. A pioneering example is the ACPX module used in the IBM 360/91, which, by stacking layers of silicon over a ceramic substrate, accommodated over 20 transistors per chip; the chips could be packed together onto a circuit board to achieve unprecedented logic densities. The IBM 360/91 was a hybrid second and third-generation computer.

Omitted from this taxonomy is the "zeroth-generation" computer based on metal gears (such as the IBM 407) or mechanical relays (such as the Mark I), and the post-third-generation computers based on Very Large Scale Integrated (VLSI) circuits.

There was also a parallel set of generations for software:

1. First generation: Machine language.
2. Second generation: Low-level programming languages such as Assembly language.
3. Third generation: Structured high-level programming languages such as C, COBOL and FORTRAN.
4. Fourth generation: "Non-procedural" high-level programming languages (such as object-oriented languages).

Throughout these multiple generations up to the 1970s, Japan built computers following U.S. and British leads. In the mid-1970s, the Ministry of International Trade and Industry stopped following western leads and started looking into the future of computing on a small scale. They asked the Japan Information Processing Development Center (JIPDEC) to indicate a number of future directions, and in 1979 offered a three-year contract to carry out more in-depth studies along with industry and academia. It was during this period that the term "fifth-generation computer" started to be used.

Prior to the 1970s, MITI guidance had successes such as an improved steel industry, the creation of the oil supertanker, the automotive industry, consumer electronics, and computer memory. MITI decided that the future was going to be information technology. However, the Japanese language, particularly in its written form, presented and still presents obstacles for computers. As a result of these hurdles, MITI held a conference to seek assistance from experts.

The primary fields for investigation from this initial project were:

- Inference computer technologies for knowledge processing
- Computer technologies to process large-scale data bases and knowledge bases
- High-performance workstations
- Distributed functional computer technologies
- Super-computers for scientific calculation

== Project launch ==
The aim was to build parallel computers for artificial intelligence applications using concurrent logic programming. The project imagined an "epoch-making" computer with supercomputer-like performance running on top of large databases (as opposed to a traditional filesystem) using a logic programming language to define and access the data using massively parallel computing/processing. They envisioned building a prototype machine with performance between 100M and 1G LIPS, where a LIPS is a Logical Inference Per Second. At the time typical workstation machines were capable of about 100k LIPS. They proposed to build this machine over a ten-year period, 3 years for initial R&D, 4 years for building various subsystems, and a final 3 years to complete a working prototype system. In 1982 the government decided to go ahead with the project, and established the Institute for New Generation Computer Technology (ICOT) through joint investment with various Japanese computer companies. After the project ended, MITI would consider an investment in a new "sixth generation" project.

Ehud Shapiro captured the rationale and motivations driving this project:

"As part of Japan's effort to become a leader in the computer industry, the Institute for New Generation Computer Technology has launched a revolutionary ten-year plan for the development of large computer systems which will be applicable to knowledge information processing systems. These Fifth Generation computers will be built around the concepts of logic programming. In order to refute the accusation that Japan exploits knowledge from abroad without contributing any of its own, this project will stimulate original research and will make its results available to the international research community."

=== Logic programming ===
The target defined by the FGCS project was to develop "Knowledge Information Processing systems" (roughly meaning, applied Artificial Intelligence). The chosen tool to implement this goal was logic programming. Logic programming approach as was characterized by Maarten Van Emden – one of its founders – as:

- The use of logic to express information in a computer.
- The use of logic to present problems to a computer.
- The use of logical inference to solve these problems.

More technically, it can be summed up in two equations:

- Program = Set of axioms.
- Computation = Proof of a statement from axioms.

The Axioms typically used are universal axioms of a restricted form, called Horn-clauses or definite-clauses. The statement proved in a computation is an existential statement. The proof is constructive, and provides values for the existentially quantified variables: these values constitute the output of the computation.

Logic programming was thought of as something that unified various gradients of computer science (software engineering, databases, computer architecture and artificial intelligence). It seemed that logic programming was a key missing connection between knowledge engineering and parallel computer architectures.

== Results ==
After having influenced the consumer electronics field during the 1970s and the automotive world during the 1980s, the Japanese had developed a strong reputation. The launch of the FGCS project spread the belief that parallel computing was the future of all performance gains, producing a wave of apprehension in the computer field. Soon parallel projects were set up in the US as the Strategic Computing Initiative and the Microelectronics and Computer Technology Corporation (MCC), in the UK as Alvey, and in Europe as the European Strategic Program on Research in Information Technology (ESPRIT), as well as the European Computer‐Industry Research Centre (ECRC) in Munich, a collaboration between ICL in Britain, Bull in France, and Siemens in Germany.

The project ran from 1982 to 1994, spending a little less than ¥57 billion (about US$320 million) total. After the FGCS Project, MITI stopped funding large-scale computer research projects, and the research momentum developed by the FGCS Project dissipated. However MITI/ICOT embarked on a neural-net project which some called the Sixth Generation Project in the 1990s, with a similar level of funding. Per-year spending was less than 1% of the entire R&D expenditure of the electronics and communications equipment industry. For example, the project's highest expenditure year was 7.2 million yen in 1991, but IBM alone spent 1.5 billion dollars (370 billion yen) in 1982, while the industry spent 2150 billion yen in 1990.

=== Concurrent logic programming ===
In 1982, during a visit to the ICOT, Ehud Shapiro invented Concurrent Prolog, a novel programming language that integrated logic programming and concurrent programming. Concurrent Prolog is a process oriented language, which embodies dataflow synchronization and guarded-command indeterminacy as its basic control mechanisms. Shapiro described the language in a Report marked as ICOT Technical Report 003, which presented a Concurrent Prolog interpreter written in Prolog. Shapiro's work on Concurrent Prolog inspired a change in the direction of the FGCS from focusing on parallel implementation of Prolog to the focus on concurrent logic programming as the software foundation for the project. It also inspired the concurrent logic programming language Guarded Horn Clauses (GHC) by Kazunori Ueda, which was the basis of KL1, the programming language that was finally designed and implemented by the FGCS project as its core programming language.

The FGCS project and its findings contributed greatly to the development of the concurrent logic programming field. The project produced a new generation of promising Japanese researchers.

=== Commercial failure ===
Five working Parallel Inference Machines (PIM) were eventually produced: PIM/m, PIM/p, PIM/i, PIM/k, PIM/c. The project also produced applications to run on these systems, such as the parallel database management system Kappa, the legal reasoning system HELIC-II, and the automated theorem prover MGTP, as well as bioinformatics applications.

The FGCS Project did not meet with commercial success for reasons similar to the Lisp machine companies and Thinking Machines. The highly parallel computer architecture was eventually surpassed in speed by less specialized hardware (for example, Sun Microsystems workstations and Intel x86 machines).

A primary problem was the choice of concurrent logic programming as the bridge between the parallel computer architecture and the use of logic as a knowledge representation and problem solving language for AI applications. This never happened cleanly; a number of languages were developed, all with their own limitations. In particular, the committed choice feature of concurrent constraint logic programming interfered with the logical semantics of the languages. The project found that the benefits of logic programming were largely negated using committed choice.

Another problem was that existing CPU performance quickly overcame the barriers that experts anticipated in the 1980s, and the value of parallel computing dropped to the point where it was for some time used only in niche situations. Although a number of workstations of increasing capacity were designed and built over the project's lifespan, they generally found themselves soon outperformed by "off the shelf" units available commercially.

The project also failed to incorporate outside innovations. During its lifespan, GUIs became mainstream in computers; the internet enabled locally stored databases to become distributed; and even simple research projects provided better real-world results in data mining.

The FGCS workstations had no appeal in a market where general purpose systems could replace and outperform them. This is parallel to the Lisp machine market, where rule-based systems such as CLIPS could run on general-purpose computers, making expensive Lisp machines unnecessary.

=== Ahead of its time ===
In summary, the Fifth-Generation project was revolutionary, and accomplished some basic research that anticipated future research directions. Many papers and patents were published. MITI established a committee which assessed the performance of the FGCS Project as having made major contributions in computing, in particular eliminating bottlenecks in parallel processing software and the realization of intelligent interactive processing based on large knowledge bases. However, the committee was strongly biased to justify the project, so this overstates the actual results.

Many of the themes seen in the Fifth-Generation project are now being re-interpreted in current technologies, as the hardware limitations foreseen in the 1980s were finally reached in the 2000s. When clock speeds of CPUs began to move into the 3–5 GHz range, CPU power dissipation and other problems became more important. The ability of industry to produce ever-faster single CPU systems (linked to Moore's Law about the periodic doubling of transistor counts) began to be threatened.

In the early 21st century, many flavors of parallel computing began to proliferate, including multi-core architectures at the low-end and massively parallel processing at the high end. Ordinary consumer machines and game consoles began to have parallel processors like the Intel Core, AMD K10, and Cell. Graphics card companies like Nvidia and AMD began introducing large parallel systems like CUDA and OpenCL.

== See also ==
- History of artificial intelligence
