= Sterling Township, Blue Earth County, Minnesota =

Township in Minnesota, United States

Sterling Township
- Township
- Location within the state of Minnesota Sterling Township (the United States)
- Coordinates: 43°53′43″N 94°4′9″W
- Country: United States
- State: Minnesota
- County: Blue Earth

Area
  - Total: 36.0 sq mi (93.3 km^{2})
  - Land: 34.4 sq mi (89.1 km^{2})
  - Water: 1.6 sq mi (4.2 km^{2})
- Elevation: 1,004 ft (306 m)

Population (2000)
  - Total: 276
  - Density: 8.0/sq mi (3.1/km^{2})
- Time zone: UTC-6 (Central (CST))
  - Summer (DST): UTC-5 (CDT)
- FIPS code: 27-62716
- GNIS feature ID: 0665707

Sterling Township is a township in Blue Earth County, Minnesota, United States. The population was 276 as of the 2000 census.

== History ==
Sterling Township was named after Stirling, in Scotland. The Sterling Congregational Church was completed in 1867.

== Geography ==
Public Land Survey System (PLSS) of the United States: Township 105 North, Range 27 West, Fifth Meridian, 23,044 Acres. According to the United States Census Bureau, the township has a total area of 36.0 square miles (93.3 km^{2}), of which 34.4 square miles (89.1 km^{2}) is land and 1.6 square miles (4.2 km^{2}) (4.50%) is water.

=== Unincorporated community ===
- Sterling Center at 43.906071°N 94.077178°W

=== Major highway ===
- Minnesota State Highway 30

=== Lakes ===
- Lura Lake (vast majority)

=== Adjacent townships ===
- Lyra Township (north)
- Beauford Township (northeast)
- Mapleton Township (east)
- Delavan Township, Faribault County (south)
- Winnebago City Township, Faribault County (southwest)
- Shelby Township (west)
- Vernon Center Township (northwest)

=== Cemeteries ===
The township contains these two cemeteries: Jackson Lake and Sterling.

== Demographics ==
As of the census of 2000, there were 276 people, 111 households, and 86 families residing in the township. The population density was 8.0 people per square mile (3.1/km^{2}). There were 114 housing units at an average density of 3.3/sq mi (1.3/km^{2}). The racial makeup of the township was 98.91% White, and 1.09% from two or more races. Hispanic or Latino of any race were 0.72% of the population.

There were 111 households, out of which 30.6% had children under the age of 18 living with them, 67.6% were married couples living together, 5.4% had a female householder with no husband present, and 22.5% were non-families. 20.7% of all households were made up of individuals, and 14.4% had someone living alone who was 65 years of age or older. The average household size was 2.49 and the average family size was 2.86.

In the township the population was spread out, with 23.6% under the age of 18, 8.0% from 18 to 24, 24.3% from 25 to 44, 25.4% from 45 to 64, and 18.8% who were 65 years of age or older. The median age was 42 years. For every 100 females, there were 102.9 males. For every 100 females age 18 and over, there were 97.2 males.

The median income for a household in the township was $49,091, and the median income for a family was $50,417. Males had a median income of $29,063 versus $24,583 for females. The per capita income for the township was $20,442. About 3.5% of families and 2.6% of the population were below the poverty line, including 2.7% of those under the age of eighteen and none of those 65 or over.
