= Starling (name) =

Starling is a given name and a surname. According to one source, the surname arose in Old English as a nickname related to the bird, starling, but the author speculates "it is hard to see why". Another source puts the surname into a list of "surnames derived from birds".

== Notable people with the name ==
Given name

- Starling Marte (born 1988), professional athlete
- Starling Thomas V (born 2000), American football player

Surname

- Alan Starling (born 1951), English footballer
- Avril Starling (born 1953), English cricketer
- Boris Starling (born 1969), English writer
- Bubba Starling (born 1992), American baseball player
- Ernest Starling (1866-1927), English physiologist
- Geoff Starling (born 1952), Australian rugby league player
- Hannah Starling (born 1995), British diver
- John Henry Starling (1883–1966), Australian public servant
- Josh Starling (born 1990), Australian Rugby League player
- Kristy Starling (contemporary), a Contemporary Christian Music singer
- Paul Starling (born 1948), Australian karateka
- Ronnie Starling (1909–1991), English footballer
- Simon Starling (born 1967), English artist

== Fictional characters ==
- Clarice Starling, a main character in the novels and films The Silence of the Lambs and Hannibal
- Juliet, Cordelia, and Rosalind Starling, from Suda 51's hack-and-slash zombie game Lollipop Chainsaw
- Robyn Starling, one of the main characters from the 1993 animated film Tom and Jerry: The Movie

== See also ==
- Sterling (given name)
- Sterling (surname)
