= Leon Sterling =

Australian computer scientist and academic

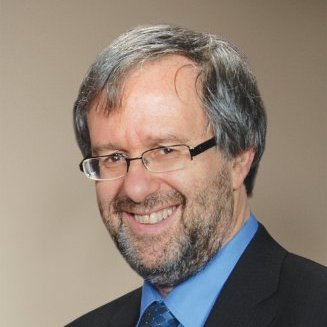

Leon Sterling is an Australian computer scientist and academic.

== Career ==
After completing a PhD at the Australian National University, Sterling worked for 15 years at universities in the UK, Israel and the United States. He returned to Australia as Professor of Computer Science at the University of Melbourne in 1995. He served as Head of the Department of Computer Science and Engineering for 6 years. After stepping down as Head, he took up an industry-sponsored chair, becoming the Adacel Professor of Software Innovation and Engineering. In 2010, he moved to Swinburne, where he served as Dean of the Faculty of Information and Communication Technologies for four years and Pro Vice-Chancellor (Digital Frontiers) for two years. He returned to the University of Melbourne in 2019, where he is a part-time Professor of Software Engineering.

Sterling has been a prominent figure in IT in Australia, serving as Head of the Council of Deans of ICT from 2012 to 2014, has been on a number of national committees, and has been a strong advocate for coding in schools through public lectures, blogs, and committee memberships. His current research is in incorporating emotions in technology development, where motivational models are an essential element. Sterling is the co-author, along with Ehud Shapiro, of the computer science textbook The Art of Prolog.
