= Birgitta Tolksdorf =

German-American actress (b. 1947)

Birgitta Anna Katharina Tolksdorf (December 9, 1947, Osnabrück, Lower Saxony – September 13, 2024, St. Louis, Missouri) who changed her name to Gittanna Tolksdorf, was a German-born American actress, best known in the United States for playing Arlene Lovett on the soap opera Love of Life from 1974 to 1980.

== Early life and education ==
Tolksdorf was born in Osnabrück, Germany, to Heinz Tolksdorf, a veterinarian, and his wife. In 1952, as a young child, she immigrated with her parents and five siblings to the United States, where they lived in Washington, Missouri. After attending high school in Washington, Tolksdorf studied music and drama at Fontbonne College, St. Louis, and took part in the college choir and theatre productions. She became a US citizen in 1963.

== Career ==
In 1974, Tolksdorf appeared in William Douglas Home's play The Secretary Bird at the Fisher Theatre, Detroit, in the role of the secretary. Later the same year, she was cast as Arlene Lovett in the soap opera Love of Life, a role she continued to play until the series ended in early 1980. She reportedly declined an offer to join The Young and the Restless in order to try out for theatre roles in New York.

== Personal life ==
She was married to Daniel Bannister, an attorney in Hermann, Missouri; he was born in 1958. They divorced in 2001
