= Stephen Stirling =

Stephen Stirling may refer to:

- Stephen Stirling (musician), British classical French horn player
- Stephen Stirling (footballer) (born 1990), Scottish football player
- Steve Stirling (born 1949), ice hockey coach
- S. M. Stirling (born 1953), writer
