= John Stirling (police officer) =

British police officer

John Stirling OBE

Chief Constable of Great Grimsby Borough Police
- In office 1900 – 11 July 1930

John Stirling OBE was a British police officer. Stirling joined the police in c.1882 and served as Chief Constable of Great Grimsby Borough Police from 1900 until his retirement on 11 July 1930. Seven officers who had begun their careers under him became Chief Constables of other forces during his term of office.

He was appointed Officer of the Order of the British Empire (OBE) in the 1920 civilian war honours.
