= Pamela Stirling =

New Zealand journalist and editor

Pamela Stirling is a New Zealand journalist and editor. In 2004 she was appointed editor of New Zealand Listener magazine.

== Biography ==
Stirling was a journalist for the New Zealand Listener for sixteen years before becoming editor in 2004. As a journalist, she received research scholarships to Cambridge and Stanford Universities.

=== Recognition ===
Stirling has won Best Editor – Current Affairs, Business & Trade at the Magazine Publishing Association Awards eight times. In 2019 she also won the Supreme Editor Award.
