= Bonnie Bartlett =

American actress (born 1929)

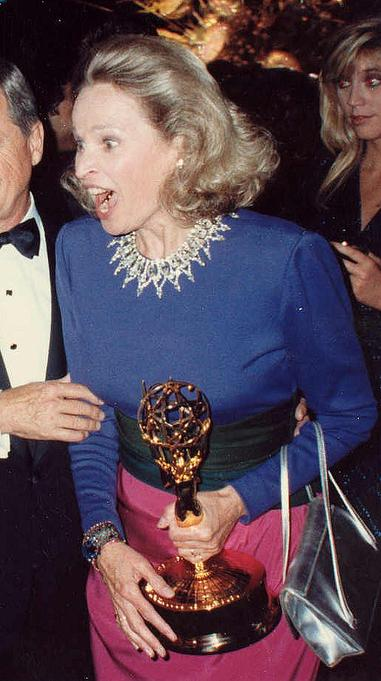
- Bartlett at the 39th Primetime Emmy Awards in 1987
- Born: June 20, 1929 (age 97); Wisconsin Rapids, Wisconsin, U.S.
- Education: Moline High School; Northwestern University
- Occupation: Actress
- Years active: 1951–2017
- Spouse: William Daniels (m. 1951)
- Children: 3 (Note: One biological child and two adopted children. One child is deceased.)

Bonnie Bartlett Daniels (born June 20, 1929) is an American retired actress, best known for her television roles. Her career spanned over seven decades; her first major role was on the 1950s daytime drama, Love of Life. Bartlett is known for her role as Grace Snider Edwards on the Michael Landon television series Little House on the Prairie and as Ellen Craig on the medical drama series St. Elsewhere. Her husband, actor William Daniels, played her fictional husband Dr. Mark Craig, and they both won Emmy Awards on the same night in 1986—becoming the first married couple to accomplish the feat since Alfred Lunt and Lynn Fontanne in 1965.

In 2026, having been married to her husband since 1951, over 75 years, they have the distinction of currently being the oldest living married couple in Hollywood.

== Early life ==
Bartlett was born in Wisconsin Rapids, Wisconsin, the daughter of Carrie Archer and Elwin Earl Bartlett, and was raised in Moline, Illinois. Her father had been an actor in stock productions across the country, but he gave up acting because her mother wanted to settle in Wisconsin.

In 1947, Bartlett graduated from Moline High School. Afterward, she attended Northwestern University, where she earned her degree in 1951.

== Career ==
Bartlett debuted in television playing the heroine Vanessa Dale Raven on the soap Love of Life from 1955 to 1959, replacing actress Peggy McCay. She then moved on to night-time roles in the 1960s.

She portrayed Grace Snider Edwards on Little House on the Prairie from 1974 to 1977 and played Ellen Craig on St. Elsewhere. Each role began as infrequently recurring characters. As Grace Snider Edwards, her character's prominence in the series gradually increased from 1975 to 1977 following the courtship by and marriage to Isaiah Edwards, played by Victor French. In St. Elsewhere, she took on greater prominence in the 1984–1985 season when the storyline included Ellen and Mark's marital problems. The storyline deepened in the next season when their son was killed, and they had to raise their granddaughter. Further difficult material included Ellen and Mark's divorce and slow reconciliation following the loss of their granddaughter in a custody dispute with her birth mother. Bartlett won back-to-back Emmys for her portrayal of Ellen Craig.

For many years, Bartlett accepted only small guest appearances on such programs as The Golden Girls, Gunsmoke, The Rockford Files, and The Waltons. Her acting career picked up considerably in the 1980s, including the TV miniseries V and North and South: Book II, as well as the pivotal role as the mother of Arnold Schwarzenegger and Danny DeVito's characters in the 1988 film, Twins.

Bartlett and husband William Daniels made Emmy Awards history in 1986 when they became the second real-life married couple to win acting awards on the same night. Alfred Lunt and Lynn Fontanne first accomplished the feat in 1965. Bartlett and Daniels won for their portrayals of Dr. Mark and Mrs. Ellen Craig on the TV series St. Elsewhere. They later acted together again when she played a college dean who employed her husband's character, in a season of Daniels's ABC series Boy Meets World, and their characters later married.

When St. Elsewhere ended in 1988, Bartlett's career moved to a wide variety of guest-starring appearances, including major roles on Wiseguy as a tough and corrupt matriarch of a sewage business; as Andrea Drey, secretary general of the United Earth Oceans Organization on seaQuest DSV; on Home Improvement as Lucille Taylor (Tim "the Tool Man" Taylor's mother); and on ER as Ruth Katherine Greene (mother of Dr. Mark Greene). Bartlett had a feature-film role in Valediction.

== Screen Actors Guild ==
Bartlett and Daniels both served on the Screen Actors Guild's board of directors.

== Awards and honors ==
Bartlett was added to the Hall of Honor at her alma mater, Moline High School in Moline, Illinois.

== Personal life ==
Bartlett met William Daniels at Northwestern University. They were married on June 30, 1951.

In 1961, she gave birth to a son, who died 24 hours later. They adopted two sons: Michael, who became an assistant director and stage manager in Los Angeles, and Robert, who became an artist and computer graphic designer based in New York City. They also have four grandchildren, two through their son, Michael and another two through their other son, Robert.

== Filmography ==
=== Film ===
| Year | Title | Role | Notes |
|---|---|---|---|
| 1976 | The Last Tycoon | Brady's Secretary | |
| 1979 | California Dreaming | Melinda Brooke | |
| 1979 | Promises in the Dark | Nurse Farber | |
| 1982 | Frances | Studio Stylist | |
| 1984 | Love Letters | Maggie Winter | |
| 1988 | Twins | Mary Ann Benedict | |
| 1993 | Dave | Female Senator | |
| 1995 | The Grass Harp | Mrs. Buster | |
| 1996 | Ghosts of Mississippi | Billie DeLaughter | |
| 1998 | Primary Colors | Martha Harris | |
| 2006 | Saving Shiloh | Mrs. Wallace | |
| 2012 | Valediction | Anabell | Short film |
| 2016 | Nina | Recital Stage Woman | |

=== Television ===
| Year | Title | Role | Notes |
|---|---|---|---|
| 1955–1959 | Love of Life | Vanessa Dale Raven | Unknown episodes |
| 1965 | The Patty Duke Show | Miss Castle | Episode: "My Cousin the Heroine" |
| 1969 | The Jackie Gleason Show | Donna Douglas | Episode: "The Honeymooners: The Honeymoon Is Over" |
| 1973 | Emergency! | Eunice Evans | Episode: "Computer Error" |
| 1974–1979 | Little House on the Prairie | Grace Snider Edwards | 26 episodes |
| 1974 | Gunsmoke | Maylee Baines | Episode: "The Foundling" |
| 1974 | The Waltons | Martha Rudge | Episode: "The Car" |
| 1974 | Gunsmoke | Agnes Benton | Episode: "In Performance of Duty" |
| 1975 | Kojak | Joan Milner | Episode: "The Good Luck Bomber" |
| 1975 | The Legend of Lizzie Borden | Sylvia Knowlton | TV movie |
| 1976 | The Rockford Files | Casey Patterson | Episode: "The Oracle Wore a Cashmere Suit" |
| 1977 | Washington: Behind Closed Doors | Joan Bailey | 2 episodes |
| 1977 | Killer on Board | Debra Snowden | Television movie |
| 1979 | Hart to Hart | Myra Bensinger | Episode: "Murder Between Friends" |
| 1979 | Salem's Lot | Ann Norton | Television movie |
| 1980 | Rape and Marriage: The Rideout Case | Norma Joyce | Television movie |
| 1980 | Barney Miller | Ellen Milford | Episode: "The Delegate" |
| 1981 | ABC Afterschool Specials | Miriam Scott | Episode: "She Drinks a Little" |
| 1981 | Knots Landing | Dr. Ruth West | Episode: "Critical Condition" |
| 1981 | A Long Way Home | JoAnn Booth | TV movie |
| 1982–1988 | St. Elsewhere | Ellen Craig | 70 episodes Primetime Emmy Award for Outstanding Supporting Actress in a Drama Series (1986–87); Viewers for Quality Television Award for Best Supporting Actress in a Quality Drama Series; Nominated—Primetime Emmy Award for Outstanding Supporting Actress in a Drama Series |
| 1982 | Barney Miller | Emily Loftis | Episode: "Inquiry" |
| 1982 | Lou Grant | Claire | Episode: "Unthinkable" |
| 1983 | V | Lynn Bernstein | 2 episodes |
| 1985 | Hotel | Olga Petrovsky | Episode: "Passports" |
| 1986 | The Deliberate Stranger | Louise Bundy | TV movie |
| 1987 | Right to Die | Lillian | TV movie |
| 1988 | The Golden Girls | Barbara Thorndyke | Episode: "Dorothy's New Friend" |
| 1989 | Matlock | Lorraine Maslin | Episode: "The Blues Singer" |
| 1989 | Murder, She Wrote | Marilyn North | Episode: "Seal of the Confessional" |
| 1989–1990 | Midnight Caller | Hillary Townsend-King | 4 episodes |
| 1990 | The Great Los Angeles Earthquake | Anita Parker | |
| 1990 | Wiseguy | Harriet Weiss | 2 episodes |
| 1992 | L.A. Law | Gloria Lee | Episode: "Diet, Diet My Darling" |
| 1992 | Room for Two | Francine Luboff | Episode: "Pilot" |
| 1992 | I'll Fly Away | Beth Lekatzis | Episode: "Fragile Truths" |
| 1994 | SeaQuest DSV | Secretary General of the UEO | Episode: "The Last Lap at Luxury" |
| 1995 | The Courtyard | Cathleen Fitzgerald | Television film |
| 1995–1998 | Home Improvement | Lucille Taylor | 5 episodes |
| 1996 | The Faculty | Katherine | Episode: "Bus Stop" |
| 1997–1998 | ER | Ruth Greene | 2 episodes |
| 1997–1999 | Boy Meets World | Dean Bolander | 5 episodes |
| 1997–1999 | The Practice | Joanne Oz | 2 episodes |
| 1997 | Touched by an Angel | Emily | Episode: "Venice" |
| 1997 | Sleeping with the Devil | Stasha Dubrovich | Television movie |
| 1998 | Stargate SG-1 | Linea | Episode: "Prisoners" |
| 1999–2002 | Once and Again | Barbara Brooks | 7 episodes |
| 2000 | Touched by an Angel | Lucy Scribner | Episode: "The Grudge" |
| 2002 | Firefly | Patience | Episode: "Serenity" |
| 2002 | Strong Medicine | Edna Carlyle | Episode: "Discharged" |
| 2003 | Touched by an Angel | Loretta | Episode: "And a Nightingale Sang" |
| 2004 | NCIS | Dr. Sylvia Chalmers | Episode: "My Other Left Foot" |
| 2005 | Huff | Margaret | Episode: "All the King's Horses" |
| 2006 | Boston Legal | Marguerite Hauser | Episode: "Shock and Oww!" |
| 2006 | General Hospital | Miriam Spinelli | 2 episodes |
| 2008 | Grey's Anatomy | Patient Rosie Bullard | Episode: "Rise Up" |
| 2012 | Of Two Minds | Kathleen | Television movie |
| 2013 | Parks and Recreation | Paula Horke | Episode: "Women In Garbage" |
| 2017 | Better Call Saul | Helen | 2 episodes |

== Book ==
- Bartlett Daniels, Bonnie (January 8, 2023). Middle of the Rainbow: How a wife, mother and daughter managed to find herself and win two Emmys. BearManor Media. ISBN 979-8-887-71044-0.
