= James Stirling (1890s footballer) =

Scottish footballer

Personal information
- Place of birth: Scotland
- Position: Inside forward

Senior career*
Years	Team	Apps	(Gls)
- Polton Vale
1895	Burnley	2	(0)
- * Club domestic league appearances and goals

James Stirling was a Scottish professional footballer who played as an inside forward. He played two matches in the English Football League for Burnley in the 1895–96 season.
