= Ron Tomme =

- Born: October 24, 1931; Chicago, Illinois
- Died: January 29, 2005 (aged 73); New York, New York
- Occupation: Actor

Ron Tomme (October 24, 1931 – January 29, 2005) was an American actor, best known for his long-running role as Bruce Sterling on the CBS soap opera Love of Life from 1959 to 1980. He also did a short term role on the ABC soap opera, Ryan's Hope and the CBS prime-time serial Dallas. He is buried at Fairview Cemetery in Linden, Michigan.
