= Stirling County, Western Australia =

Coordinates: 34°44′S 116°43′E

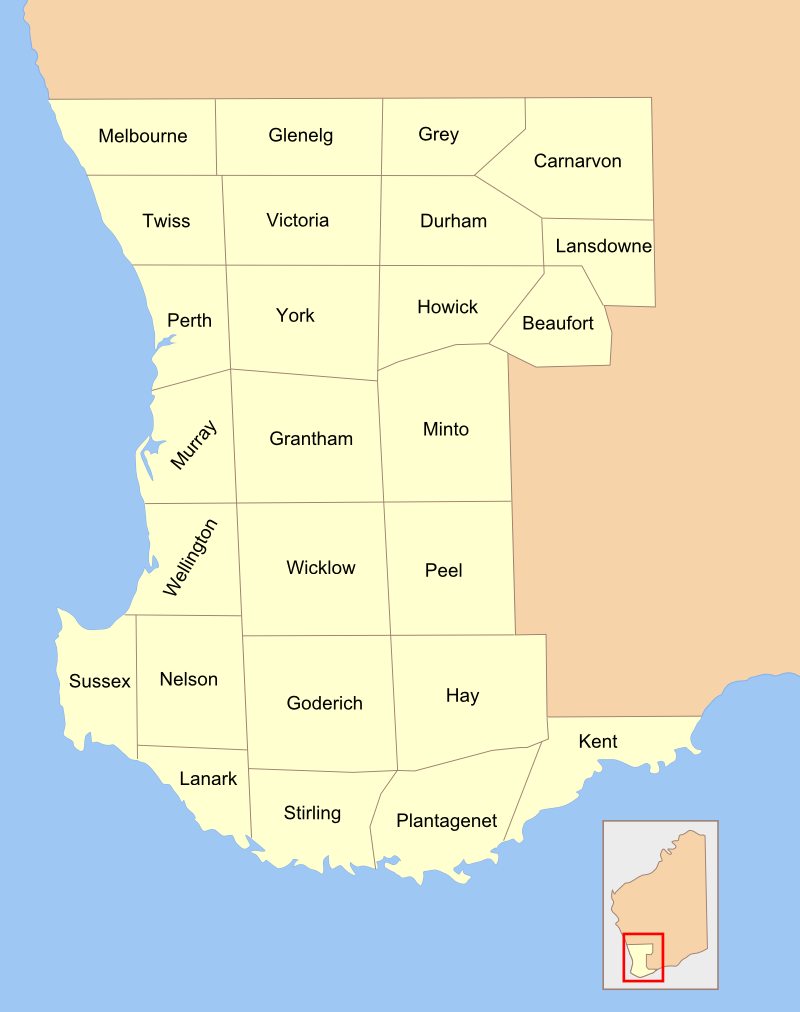
26 counties of Western Australia

Stirling County was one of the 26 counties of Western Australia that were designated in 1829 as cadastral divisions. It approximately corresponds to the southern part of the Hay Land District which forms the basis for land titles in the area.
