= HMS Stirling Castle =

A number of ships of the Royal Navy and Royal Fleet Auxiliary have been named Stirling Castle (sometimes spelled 'Sterling') after Stirling Castle in Scotland, including:

- HMS Stirling Castle (1679), a 70-gun third-rate ship of the line, launched in 1679, and lost off Ramsgate in Kent in 1703.
- HMS Stirling Castle (1705), a 70-gun third-rate ship of the line launched in 1705, hulked in 1739 and broken up in 1771.
- HMS Stirling Castle (1742), a 70-gun third-rate ship of the line launched in 1742 and lost in 1762.
- HMS Stirling Castle (1775), a 64-gun third-rate ship of the line launched in 1775 and lost in 1780.
- HMS Stirling Castle (1811), a 74-gun third-rate ship of the line launched in 1811, and hulked in 1839.
- HMS Stirling Castle (M01), a mine countermeasures support vessel commissioned in 2025, formerly RFA Stirling Castle

Additionally, the paddle steamer Stirling Castle, launched in 1900, was hired by the Admiralty for auxiliary patrol in May 1916 from The Southampton, Isle of Wight and South of England Royal Mail Steam Packet Co. Limited for £155 per month. Never styled "HMS", she sank on 16 September 1916 off Malta in an explosion, cause unknown.

== See also ==
- HMS Sterling, a destroyer
