= Love of Life =

American television soap opera (1951-1980)

- Main title card (1950s).
- Created by: Roy Winsor
- Starring: Audrey Peters; Ron Tomme
- Country of origin: United States
- Original language: English
- No. of seasons: 29
- No. of episodes: 7,315

Production
- Running time: 15 minutes (1951–1958); 30 minutes (1958–1962, 1969–1973, 1979–1980); 25 minutes (1962–1969, 1973–1979)

Original release
- Network: CBS
- Release: September 24, 1951 – February 1, 1980

Love of Life is an American soap opera televised on CBS from September 24, 1951, to February 1, 1980. It was created by Roy Winsor, whose previous creation Search for Tomorrow premiered three weeks before Love of Life; he created The Secret Storm two and a half years later.

A scripted audio revival of the series is set to premiere in the Spring of 2027.

== Production ==
Love of Life was originally taped at Liederkranz Hall on East 58th Street in Manhattan. Mike and Buff (Mike Wallace), Ernie Kovacs, and Douglas Edwards and the News, as well as Search for Tomorrow and The Guiding Light were also recorded from that location. The program originated at other studios in Manhattan, but primarily at the CBS Broadcast Center on West 57th Street and CBS' Studio 52 behind the Ed Sullivan Theater. In 1975, the series moved to make way for a nightclub that became known as Studio 54. Until its final episode in 1980, Love of Life was taped in Studio 41 at the CBS Broadcast Center.

On September 4, 2026, it was announced that the soap opera was being revived as a scripted audio drama, set to debut in 2027.

=== Format ===
Unlike most other soap operas, Love of Life was originally not split up into segments dictated by commercial breaks. Because the show was owned by packaged-goods giant American Home Products and merely licensed to CBS, all commercials were for AH products, and occurred before or after the show. In the 1960s, one commercial break was allotted around the middle of the program, but this was mostly to allow affiliates to reconnect with the feed after airing local commercials. Love of Life adopted the "five segments per half-hour" standard in the 1970s.

== Broadcast history ==
Love of Life began, as most other television serials of that era, as a 15-minute program, airing at 12:15 pm Eastern Time (11:15 am Central). The program became so popular, CBS expanded it to 30 minutes on April 14, 1958, moving it to noon/11:00, replacing the fifteen-minute soap opera Hotel Cosmopolitan. During the 1950s and 1960s, Love of Life generally placed among the top six soaps in the ratings. On October 1, 1962, the program's running time was reduced by five minutes to accommodate an abbreviated network newscast.

To accommodate the new in-house serial Where the Heart Is, on September 8, 1969, CBS moved Love of Life ahead 30 minutes to 11:30/10:30, replacing daytime reruns of The Dick Van Dyke Show, thus restoring it to a full 30-minute runtime. The timeslot change put the series up against the game show Hollywood Squares on NBC, causing Love of Life's audience share dropped from fifth place in the Nielsen daytime ratings during the 1968–1969 season to 11th in the 1969–1970 season. This helped give NBC a major win in 1971 as Hollywood Squares, Jeopardy!, and the serial Days of Our Lives all reached the top-five-rated shows among daytime network programs. On March 26, 1973, episodes were again reduced to fit a 25-minute slot to accommodate a newscast. By this time, CBS had assumed production from the original packager, AHP, as it had with The Secret Storm.

CBS canceled its in-house soaps Love is a Many Splendored Thing and Where the Heart Is in 1973, and The Secret Storm in early 1974. Love of Life managed to escape cancellation due to a brief rise in the ratings in the mid-1970s, which was due to Meg's return to the storyline. The show's ratings climbed as high as ninth, above General Hospital and One Life to Live, in the 1975–1976 television season.

On April 23, 1979, CBS moved Love of Life to the 4:00/3:00 pm slot that had opened up when the network canceled Match Game. Episodes once again were expanded to 30 minutes. However, ratings plummeted following the move; an increasing number of CBS affiliates pre-empted the serial to show more profitable syndicated programming as many ABC affiliates had done to Love of Life's former CBS sister soap The Edge of Night, which had been airing on ABC for the last four years, also in the 4:00 pm time slot after being cancelled by CBS four years earlier due to the expansion of As the World Turns to a full hour in December 1975. In September 1979, a new, daily, syndicated version of Match Game was introduced; in some markets, the show was aired against or, on CBS stations, in place of Love of Life.

Despite CBS moving the show to the 4:00/3:00 timeslot, some affiliates chose to air it at earlier timeslots in pattern with the other soaps. For example, in Indianapolis, then-CBS affiliate WISH-TV aired Love of Life at 3:30 (Eastern) while airing One Day at a Time reruns at 4:00. Many West Coast stations, such as CBS-owned KNXT (now KCBS-TV) in Los Angeles, did this, as well, keeping Love of Life in tandem with the other soaps by airing it at 2:30 Pacific time, after Guiding Light. Other stations, such as then-O&O KMOX-TV (now KMOV) in St. Louis, kept the show in late morning at 11:00 (Central). Additionally, WDVM-TV (now WUSA) in Washington, DC, chose to keep Love of Life at 11:30 while pre-empting The Price Is Right. In the soap's home market of New York City, WCBS-TV aired it at noon.

Within 10 months, CBS realized that the 4:00 slot did not work for Love of Life in light of affiliate tape-delays and pre-emptions, and subsequently cancelled the show in January 1980. Its final episode aired on February 1, 1980; atypical for a soap opera concluding its run, the remaining storylines ended on a cliffhanger, a byproduct of the limited turnaround between the cancellation announcement and the end of production for writers to adequately resolve the plots. The following Monday, The Young and the Restless expanded to an hour, with One Day at a Time moving into the 4:00/3:00 timeslot in most markets following Guiding Light. According to rumors, once CBS cancelled Love of Life, they intended to use the show's New York studio space for the 1980 Winter Olympics, which took place later that month in Lake Placid, New York.

Director Larry Auerbach said that he lamented the network's 4:00/3:00 slot choice on the CBS Evening News the day Love of Life finished airing, feeling that the slot was better suited to airing shows that appealed to kids after school.

== Storyline ==
=== 1951–1960 ===
The original story was a morality play of good versus evil, illustrated by the interactions between two sisters, Vanessa Dale (originally Peggy McCay) and Meg Dale (originally Jean McBride, from 1951 to 1958). Vanessa (often referred to as "Van" for short) was "the good girl". She stood up for what was right in life and in her community. Meg was the schemer and all-around "bad" girl, as well as the mother of "Beanie" (later "Ben") Harper, originally played by Dennis Parnell. While Van disapproved of Meg's actions, she still loved her and taught the audience the value of forgiveness which often involved Beanie, and his strained relationship with Meg, his mother. The show was painted black-and-white in this regard, which was evident in the tagline recited at the beginning of each of the earlier episodes: "Love of Life: The exciting story of Vanessa Dale and her courageous struggle for human dignity."

The show changed directions when the character of Meg was phased out and the show changed locales; first set in the fictional town of Barrowsville, it moved to Rosehill, where it remained for the rest of the show's run.

The actress who originated the role of Van (Peggy McCay) left the show in 1955, and was replaced by actress Bonnie Bartlett (1955–1959). Bartlett was subsequently replaced by Audrey Peters, who played Van for the rest of the run (1959–1980). Peters had an unusual debut – Bartlett had played the role of Vanessa up to Vanessa's wedding day. The next day, when Vanessa walked down the aisle, Bruce Sterling raised Vanessa's veil and revealed Audrey Peters. Peters admitted that, during the wedding reception scenes afterward, she did not know the names of all the characters who were interacting with Vanessa, so she called everyone "dear".

=== 1960–1973 ===
In the 1960s, most of the drama was focused on Van and her new marriage to Bruce Sterling (played by Ron Tomme). The late 1960s involved attempts to shake up the somewhat staid atmosphere through campus unrest and a return of Vanessa's first husband, who had been killed off in the mid-1950s. Her ex-husband was an amnesiac going by the name of Matt Corby. Vanessa divorced Bruce to reunite with her first husband, outraging many in the audience who could not accept their heroine getting a divorce.

The other major story of the late 1960s involved Tess Krakauer and Bill Prentiss, played by real-life couple Toni Bull Bua and Gene Bua. Tess and Bill had the perfunctory tortured love story, including separations, children, and murder trials, until Bill died of a "rare blood disease" in 1972 and Tess left town in 1973.

=== 1973–1980 ===
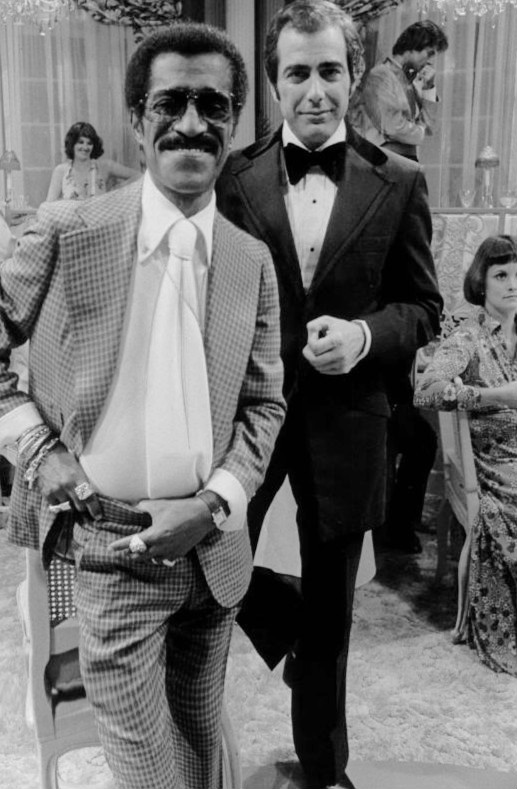
Sammy Davis, Jr., in a guest-starring role on the show, 1975

As ratings began to slide in the 1970s, Meg and her son Ben Harper were reintroduced. Meg was played by Tudi Wiggins from 1974 to 1980. Ben, now an adult, was played by Christopher Reeve from 1974 to 1976 and later recast and played by Chandler Hill Harben from 1976 to 1980. Under the reins of Claire Labine and Paul Avila Mayer, the show returned to the original "good Vanessa, bad Meg" theme. In one episode, Meg called her son's newborn daughter Suzanne a "bastard", one of the first times the word was spoken on daytime television.

After Labine and Mayer left in 1975 to develop the ABC serial Ryan's Hope, the show lost the original intended focus. Emphasis was increased on gritty story lines (for example, Ben, now played by Chandler Hill Harben, was nearly raped while in prison serving time for bigamy), but these were not warmly received by the audience, and the ratings dropped. The show occupied a vulnerable timeslot. Since the beginning, Love of Life had aired in the late morning – and few soaps had been successful when airing before noon. The show's ratings had been respectable but middling in the 1950s and 1960s, but dropped sharply in the early 1970s. In 1976, Rick Latimer (Jerry Lacy) and his wife Cal (Roxanne Gregory) welcomed a young vet Michael Blake (Richard E. Council) into their garage apartment. Michael's secret "crush" on Cal led to a vacation rendezvous and a fatal boating accident resulting from Blake's failed attempt to save Cal's son (Hank) from a sudden lake squall. Their son survived, but Blake drowned. Rick, Cal, and their son left Rosehill for Montreal to start a new life.

On April 23, 1979, in a last-ditch effort to save Love of Life, CBS moved the show to 4:00 pm. Head writers Jean Holloway and Ann Marcus' stories did not catch on with the audience.

Love of Life ended its run with a cliffhanger on February 1, 1980. After testifying in a trial, Betsy Crawford (Margo McKenna) collapsed while leaving the stand. No other networks picked up the show, and the cliffhanger remained unresolved. The final shot of the series was of longtime director Larry Auerbach, portfolio in hand, walking through the empty sets and out the CBS Broadcast Center Studio 41 gate, as Tony Bennett's "We'll Be Together Again" played.

== Cast ==
Actor	Character	Duration
John Aniston	Edouard "Eddie" Alaeta	1975–1978
Tirell Barbery	Carol Raven	1954–1956
Bonnie Bartlett	Vanessa Dale #2	1955–1959
Bonnie Bedelia	Sandy Porter	1961–1965
Richard Coogan	Paul Raven #1	1951-1956
Deborah Courtney	Caroline "Cal" Alaeta #1	1973-1976; 2027
Tom Fitzsimmons	Price Madden	1974
Steven Gethers	Hal Craig	1953-1956
Richard Ely	Dr. Tom Crawford #1	1976-1979
Chandler Hill Harben	Ben Harper #4	1976–1980
Ron Schnittker	Ben Harper #5	2027
Elizabeth Kemp	Betsy Harper #1	1973–1977
Elizabeth von Isser	Betsy Harper #3	2027
Anne Loring	Tammy Forrest #2	1956-1970
Jean McBride	Meg Dale #1	1951–1958
Peggy McCay	Vanessa Dale #1	1951–1955
Audrey Peters	Vanessa Dale #3	1959–1980
Nina Reader	Barbara Sterling #1	1959-1961
Christopher Reeve	Ben Harper #3	1974-1976
Paul Savior	Rick Latimer #1	1960-1966
John Straub	Guy Latimer	1962-1963
Birgitta Tolksdorf	Arlene Lovett Harper	1974–1980
Ron Tomme	Bruce Sterlling	1959–1980
Tudi Wiggins	Meg Dale #2	1974–1980
Ray Wise	Jamie Rollins #2	1970-1976
Renee Suran	Stacy Corby #2	2027

== Main crew ==
=== Executive producers ===
Name
Roy Winsor
Bertram Berman
Jean Arley
Darryl Hickman
Casey S. Hutchison

=== Head writers ===
Name
Roy Winsor
Frank Provo and John Pickard
Richard and Esther Shapiro
Loring Mandel
Claire Labine and Paul Avila Mayer
Margaret DePriest
Paul and Margaret Schnieder
Gabrielle Upton
Jean Holloway
Ann Marcus
Casey S. Hutchison and Erik Andrus

- Larry Auerbach
- Heather Hill (unknown episodes)
- Robert Myhrum (unknown episodes)
- Robert Scinto (unknown episodes)
- Art Wolff (unknown episodes)
- Loring Mandel (1970–1972)
- Paul Avila Mayer (1973–1975)
- Claire Labine (1973–1975)
- Don Ettlinger (unknown episodes)
- John D. Hess (unknown episodes)
- Harry W. Junkin (unknown episodes)
- John Pickard (unknown episodes)
- Frank Provo (unknown episodes)
- Phyllis White (unknown episodes)
- Roy Winsor
- Louis Ringwald
