= Dorothy Provine =

American singer, dancer, actress (1935–2010)

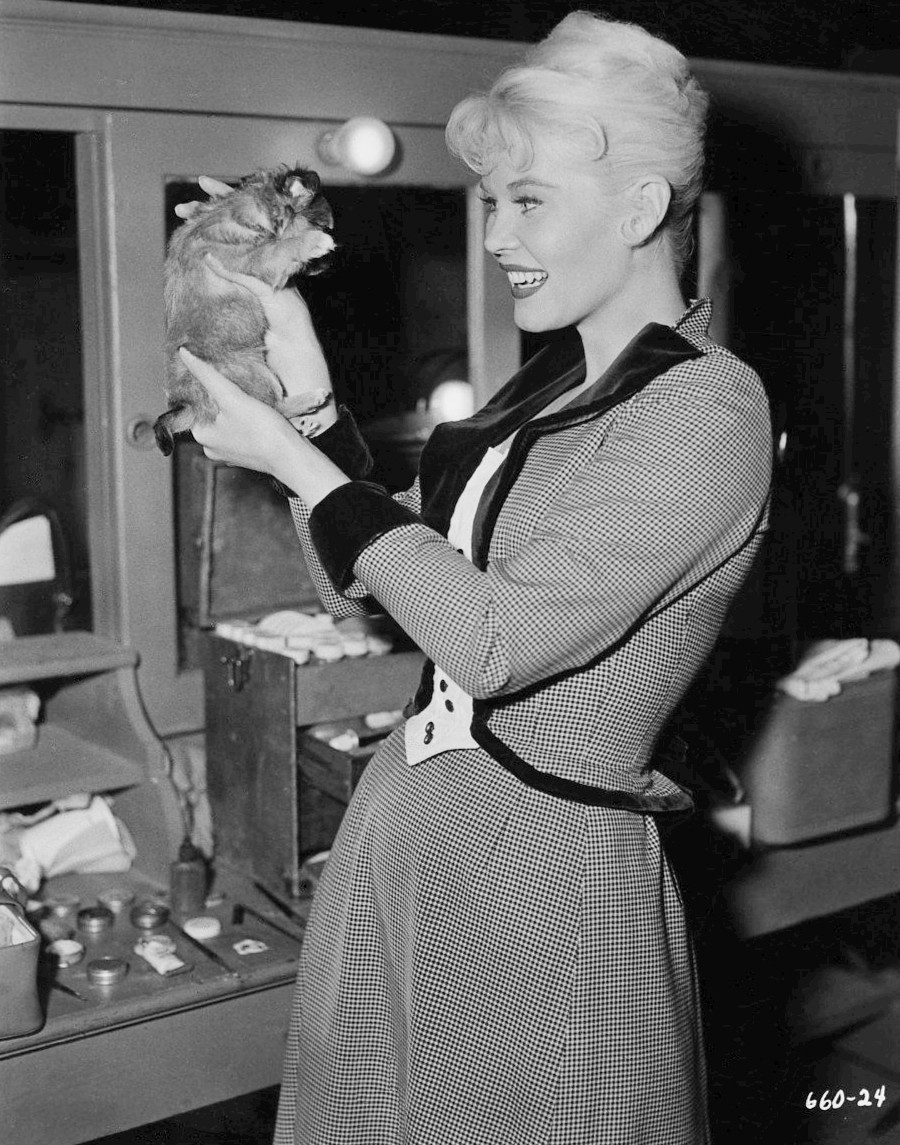
- Provine in 1959
- Born: Dorothy Michelle Provine; January 20, 1935; Deadwood, South Dakota, U.S.
- Died: April 25, 2010 (aged 75); Bremerton, Washington, U.S.
- Education: University of Washington
- Occupations: Actress; dancer; singer
- Years active: 1957–1976
- Spouse: Robert Day (m. 1968)
- Children: 1

Dorothy Michelle Provine (January 20, 1935 – April 25, 2010) was an American singer, dancer and actress. Born in 1935 in Deadwood, South Dakota, she grew up in Seattle, Washington, and was hired in 1958 by Warner Bros., after which she first starred in The Bonnie Parker Story and played many roles in TV series. During the 1960s, Provine starred in series such as The Alaskans and The Roaring Twenties, and her major film roles included It's a Mad, Mad, Mad, Mad World (1963), Good Neighbor Sam (1964), The Great Race (1965), That Darn Cat! (1965), Kiss the Girls and Make Them Die (1966), Who's Minding the Mint? (1967), and Never a Dull Moment (1968).

== Early life and career ==
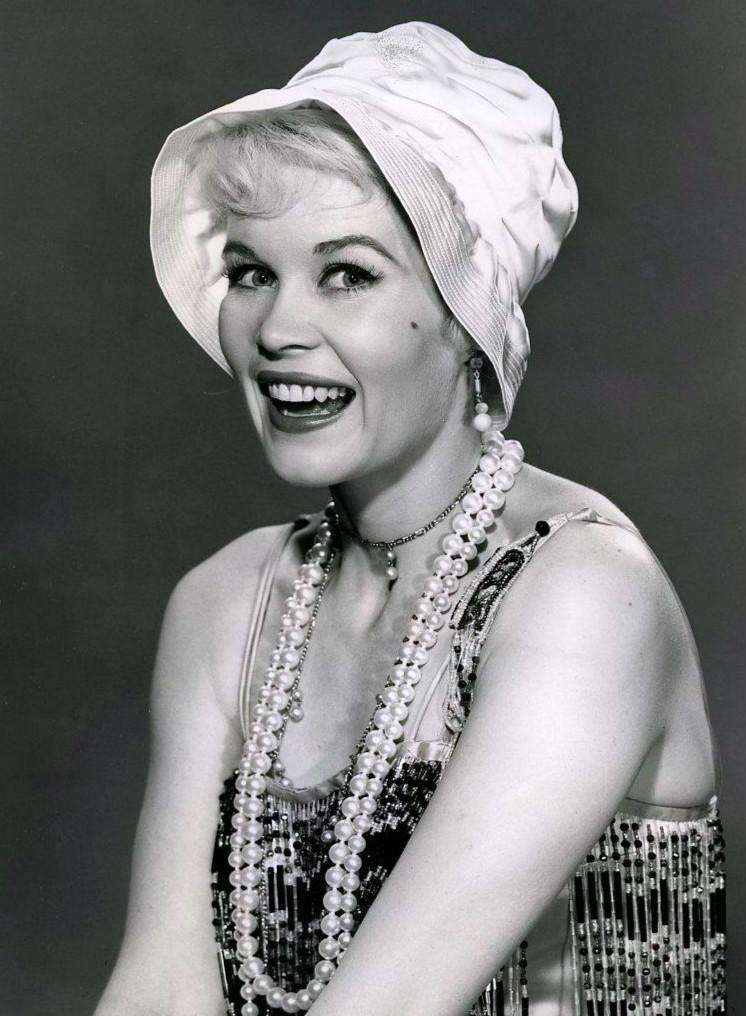
Provine in 1962

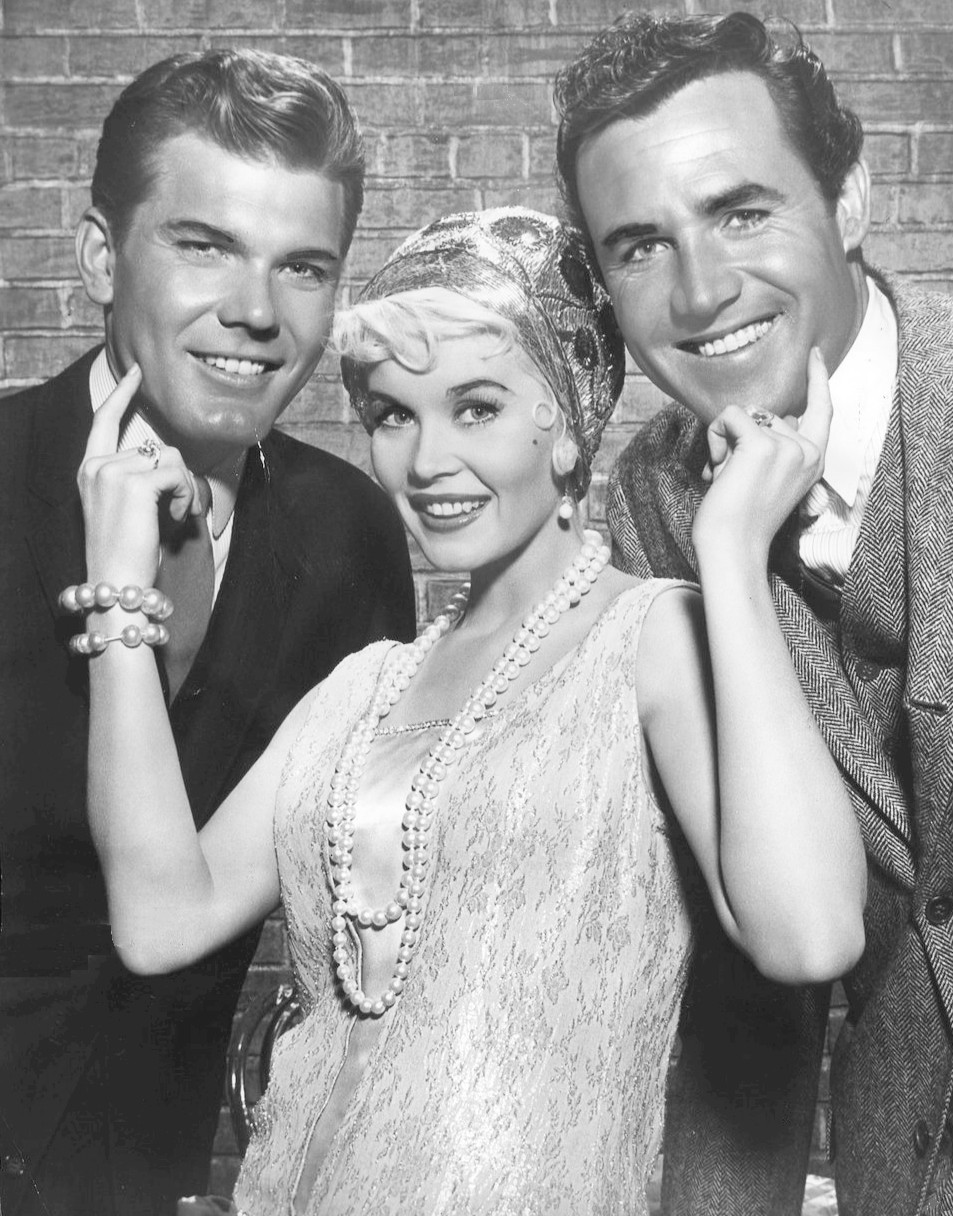
With Donald May and Rex Reason in The Roaring Twenties (1962)

Provine was born in Deadwood in southwestern South Dakota, to William and Irene Provine, but grew up in Seattle, Washington, where her parents ran a nightclub. She attended the University of Washington in Seattle, from which she graduated with a degree in Theater Arts in 1957. While there, she joined the women's fraternity Alpha Gamma Delta. In Washington, she handed out prizes for a quiz program on a local television station until she was hired by Warner Bros. at $500 per week. In Hollywood, she starred in the titular role as the cigar-chomping, machine-gun firing heroine of the 1958 film The Bonnie Parker Story directed by William Witney. That same year, she performed in a credited walk-on part in the NBC Western television series Wagon Train, in the episode "The Marie Dupree Story." In 1959, she was in the cast of The 30 Foot Bride of Candy Rock, which was Lou Costello's last screen appearance. In that same year she again appeared in Wagon Train in the episode "Matthew Lowry Story", this time having a part that ran the full episode.

On January 3, 1959, Provine appeared as Laura Winfield in the episode "The Bitter Lesson" of the NBC Western series Cimarron City. Laura Winfield is a newly arrived schoolteacher with false credentials who is plotting with a male companion to rob a stage shipment of gold, but not before Deputy Sheriff Lane Temple (series star John Smith) falls in love with her. Dan Blocker and Gregg Palmer also appear in this episode as interested suitors of the new teacher. A few weeks thereafter, she was cast in a supporting role in the episode "The Giant Killer" of the ABC/Warner Bros. Western series Sugarfoot, with Will Hutchins in the title role.

In 1959, Provine appeared as Ann Donnelly in the episode "The Confession" of another ABC/WB Western series, Colt .45, starring Wayde Preston. Charles Aidman was cast in this episode as Arthur Sibley; Don C. Harvey as Sheriff Clinter. About this time she was also cast in an episode of the ABC sitcom The Real McCoys starring Walter Brennan.

Another 1959 appearance was as "Chalmers" in the episode "Blood Money" of the CBS televised Western The Texan starring Rory Calhoun as Bill Longley and Ralph Meeker in the guest cast as Sam Kerrigan. She also guest starred in the syndicated Western series Man Without a Gun starring Rex Reason.

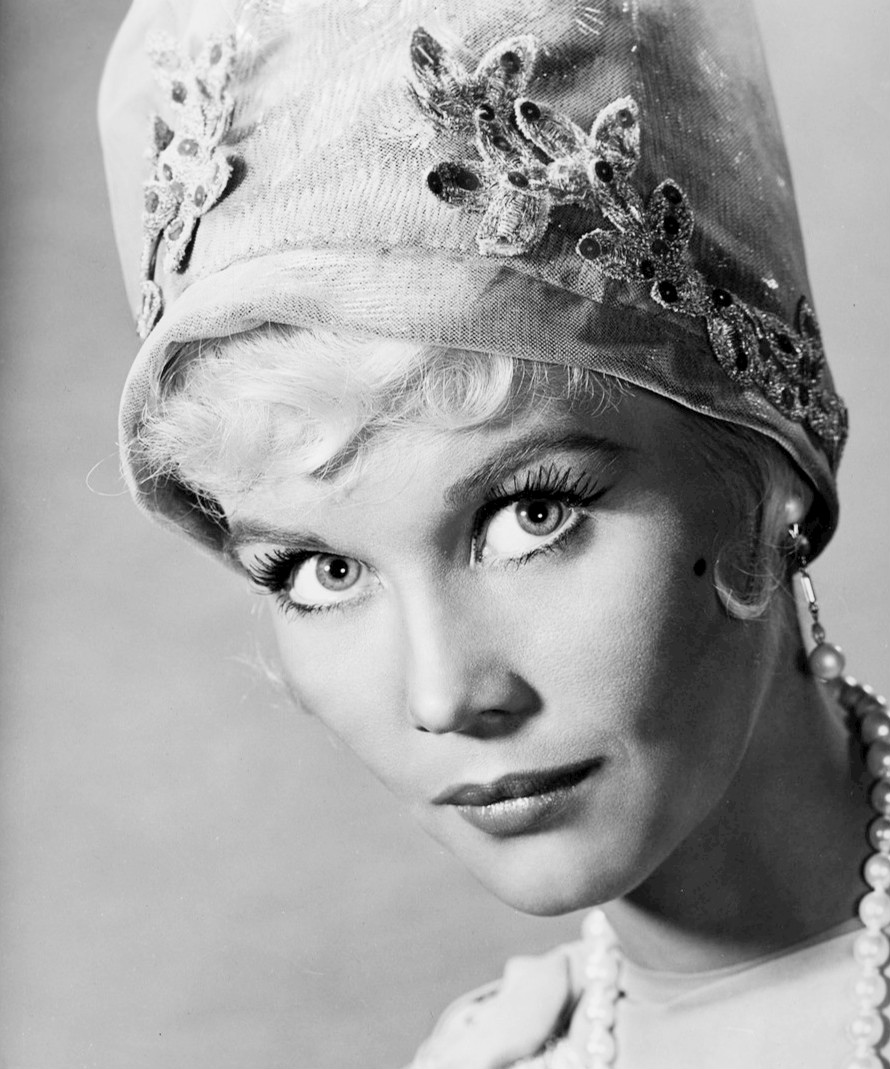
Provine in The Roaring Twenties

Provine had a starring role in two ABC/WB series: The Alaskans (1959–1960) starring Roger Moore in which she played Rocky Shaw, and The Roaring Twenties (1960–1962), in which she portrayed dazzling singer/dancer Pinky Pinkham. A profile in Time stated that "It is Dorothy’s oooohing and shimmying that have kept the series afloat." Rex Reason, from Man Without a Gun, co-starred with her in The Roaring Twenties along with Donald May, John Dehner, Mike Road, and Gary Vinson. Provine recorded an album of songs from the show and had two hit singles in the UK Singles Chart — "Don't Bring Lulu" (number 17 in 1961) and "Crazy Words, Crazy Tune" (number 45 in 1962).

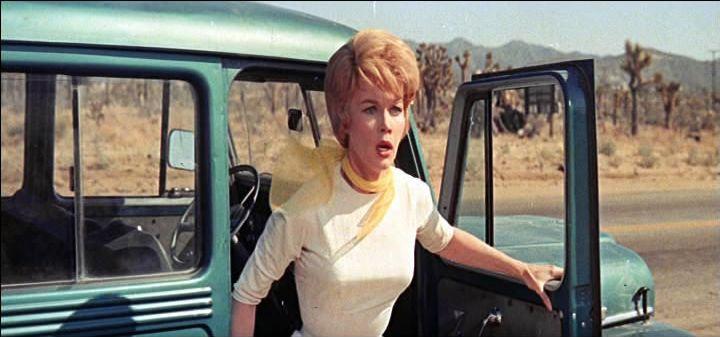
Provine in It's a Mad, Mad, Mad, Mad World (1963)

She guest-starred in the 25th episode of The Gallant Men called "Tommy", which aired in March 1963. Her character name was Joyce Adams, a singer who entertained the troops.

In September 1965, Provine starred in the two-part episode "Alexander the Greater" that opened the second season of The Man from U.N.C.L.E. TV series, starring Robert Vaughn and David McCallum alongside Rip Torn and David Opatoshu, later repackaged as the theatrical feature One Spy Too Many (1966).

Provine's best-known film role was as Emeline Marcus-Finch, beleaguered wife of Milton Berle's character in Stanley Kramer's epic comedy It's a Mad, Mad, Mad, Mad World (1963). She also appeared in Good Neighbor Sam (1964) with Jack Lemmon, The Great Race (1965) with Tony Curtis and Jack Lemmon, Walt Disney's That Darn Cat! (1965), Kiss the Girls and Make Them Die (1966), Who's Minding the Mint? (1967) with Walter Brennan and Berle again, and Never a Dull Moment (1968) with Dick Van Dyke.

== Personal life and death ==
During the filming of The Alaskans (1959–1960), Provine had an affair with her co-star, Roger Moore, who was married to singer Dorothy Squires.

In 1968, Provine married the film and television director Robert Day and retired from acting, apart from occasional guest roles on television. About 1990 the couple moved to Bainbridge Island, Washington, where they resided with their son. Provine was reclusive in retirement, indulging her love of reading and movies, occasionally driving around the island with her husband.

Provine died of emphysema on April 25, 2010, in Bremerton, Washington.

== Filmography ==
=== Film ===
Year	Title	Role	Notes
1958	Live Fast, Die Young	Jackie	Uncredited
1958	The Bonnie Parker Story	Bonnie Parker	
1959	Riot in Juvenile Prison	Babe	
1959	The 30 Foot Bride of Candy Rock	Emmy Lou Rossiter	
1963	Wall of Noise	Ann Conroy	
1963	It's a Mad, Mad, Mad, Mad World	Emeline Marcus-Finch	
1964	Good Neighbor Sam	Minerva Bissell	
1965	The Great Race	Lily Olay	
1965	That Darn Cat!	Ingrid Randall	
1966	One Spy Too Many	Tracey Alexander	
1966	Kiss the Girls and Make Them Die	Susan Fleming	
1967	Who's Minding the Mint?	Verna Baxter	
1968	Never a Dull Moment	Sally Inwood	

=== Television ===
Year	Title	Role	Notes
1957	Man Without a Gun		Episode: "Man Missing"
1958	The Millionaire	Rosemary MacIntyre	Episode: "The David Barrett Story"
1958	Lawman	Julie Preston	Episode: "Lady in Question"
1958–1959	Wagon Train	Marian Pruitt / Susie	2 episodes
1958–1962	77 Sunset Strip	Nora Shirley / Betty	3 episodes
1959	Mickey Spillane's Mike Hammer	Suzy Keeler	Episode: "Coney Island Baby"
1959	Cimarron City	Laura Winfield	Episode: "The Bitter Lesson"
1959	The Real McCoys	Glory	Episode: "The McCoys Visit Hollywood"
1959	Alfred Hitchcock Presents	Sharon Trotter	Season 4 Episode 14: "The Morning After"
1959	Sugarfoot	Miss Bonnie / Ada	2 episodes
1959	The Rough Riders	Holly Morrow	Episode: "Lesson in Violence"
1959	The Texan	Chalmers	Episode: "Blood Money"
1959	Colt .45	Ann Donnelly	Episode: "The Confession"
1959	Bronco	Gilda Harper	Episode: "Red Water North"
1959–1960	The Alaskans	Rocky Shaw	36 episodes
1960–1962	The Roaring 20's	Pinky Pinkham	45 episodes
1962	Hawaiian Eye	Nora Stewart / Arnel Wade	2 episodes
1962	The Red Skelton Show	Piper Novak	Episode: "The Bride of Bolivar"
1962	You're Only Young Once	Mildred Offenbach	Television film
1963	The Gallant Men	Joyce Adams	Episode: "Tommy"
1965	Dr. Kildare	Sally Boles	Episode: "Music Hath Charms"
1965	Bob Hope Presents the Chrysler Theatre	Julie	Episode: "Simon Says Get Married"
1965	The Man from U.N.C.L.E.	Tracey Alexander	Season 2 Episode 1: "Alexander the Greater Affair: Part 1"
1965	The Man from U.N.C.L.E.	Tracey Alexander	Season 2 Episode 2: "Alexander the Greater Affair: Part 2"
1968	The Danny Thomas Hour	Laura Merrill	Episode: "My Pal Tony"
1968	The F.B.I.	Irene Minnock	Episode: "Breakthrough"
1968	The Sound of Anger	Marge Carruthers	Television film
1970	Love, American Style	April	Segment: "Love and Those Poor Crusaders' Wives"
1973	Police Story	Harriett Bonner	Episode: "The Big Walk"
1976	Police Woman		Episode: "The Trick Book"

== Discography ==
- The Roaring 20's, 1960 Warner Bros.: WM 4035 (W1394). Musical direction by Sandy Courage. Included two songs which were A sides of hit singles: Don't Bring Lulu and Crazy Words - Crazy Tune.
- The Vamp of The Roaring 20s - Vol. 2, 1961 Warner Bros.: WM 4053. Musical direction by Sandy Courage.
- Oh You Kid!, 1962 Warner Bros.: 1962 Warner Bros.: W 1466. With Joe "Fingers" Carr.
