= Kiss the Girls and Make Them Die =

1966 film by Arduino Maiuri, Henry Levin

- Original film poster
- Directed by: Henry Levin
- Screenplay by: Jack Pulman; Dino Maiuri
- Story by: Dino Maiuri
- Produced by: Dino De Laurentiis
- Starring: Mike Connors; Dorothy Provine; Raf Vallone; Margaret Lee; Nicoletta Machiavelli; Beverly Adams; Terry-Thomas
- Cinematography: Aldo Tonti
- Edited by: Ralph Kemplen; Alberto Gallitti
- Music by: Mario Nascimbene
- Production company: Dino de Laurentiis Cinematografica
- Distributed by: Columbia Pictures
- Release date: September 8, 1966
- Running time: 106 minutes
- Countries: Italy; United States
- Language: English

Kiss the Girls and Make Them Die (Italian: Se tutte le donne del mondo... (Operazione Paradiso)) is a James Bond spoof film released in 1966 as an Italian-American co-production between Dino De Laurentiis' Cinematografica and Columbia Pictures. Directed by Henry Levin, with stars Mike Connors, Dorothy Provine, and as the villain, Raf Vallone, it was originally filmed from January to March 1966 under the title Operation Paradise and distributed in some parts of the English-speaking world as If All the Women in the World.

== Plot ==
Financed by Red China, a Brazilian industrialist plans to sterilize the United States through massive doses of radiation courtesy of his satellite. He double crosses the Chinese by scheming to sterilize the entire Earth, then personally repopulate the planet with beautiful women he has kidnapped and is holding in suspended animation. A down-to-earth CIA agent, an aristocratic female MI-6 agent, and her chauffeur, driving a Rolls-Royce car filled with spy gadgets, team up to stop the madman.

== Cast ==
- Mike Connors as Kelly
- Dorothy Provine as Susan Fleming
- Raf Vallone as Mr. Ardonian
- Margaret Lee as Grace
- Nicoletta Machiavelli as Sylvia
- Beverly Adams as Karin
- Marilù Tolo as Gioia
- Seyna Seyn as Wilma Soong
- Oliver McGreevy as Ringo
- Sandro Dori as Omar
- Jack Gwillim as British ambassador
- Andy Ho as Ling
- Renato Terra
- George Leech
- Hans Thorner as Kruger
- Nerio Bernardi as Papal envoy
- Roland Bartrop
- Michael Audley as Major Davis
- Edith Peters as Maria
- Terry-Thomas as Lord Aldric / James

== Music credits ==
- Music and special musical effects by Mario Nascimbene
- Conducted by Roberto Pregadio
- Harmonica soloist John Sebastian
- The song "Kiss the Girls and Make Them Die" is sung by Lydia MacDonald, with lyrics by Howard Greenfield

== Background ==
An example of the mod Eurospy form, then at the height of its popularity, Kiss the Girls and Make Them Die reflected that genre's formula of exaggerated semicomic action filmed in colorful locales around the world (Rio de Janeiro in this case), frequently using average-reputation American directors (Henry Levin subsequently directed two Matt Helm films) and American leads best known for starring in television shows and appearing in occasional films. As far as the casting for this production was concerned, Michael Connors had earlier been the star of a 1959–60 crime series, Tightrope!, and the following year, after streamlining his stage name to "Mike Connors", starred as the long-running private eye, Mannix (1967–75), while Dorothy Provine was one of the stars in The Alaskans (1959–60) and The Roaring 20's (1960–62). Two years earlier, Provine and Connors played key supporting roles as second leads in the 1964 Jack Lemmon–Romy Schneider comedy vehicle Good Neighbor Sam. All the other Kiss the Girls cast members were primarily recognizable as regular players in European films, including co-stars Raf Vallone, Margaret Lee, and comedy relief Terry-Thomas, who was given a special "and" billing at the end of the actors' credits.

This film was rushed into release by Columbia Pictures to avoid colliding with their better-known James Bond satire, Casino Royale. The plot of Kiss the Girls and Make Them Die is similar to the James Bond film Moonraker, which was released 13 years later.

== Production ==
Michael Connors recalled that Columbia Pictures gave him the lead after he had been a strong contender for the role of Matt Helm that Dean Martin played. His casting was announced in August 1965.

Connors said that Dorothy Provine was whisked to Rome for a week, returning in a glamorous makeover. While Connors portrayed a Sean Connery-type American superspy, Dorothy Provine played her role with an upper-class British accent similar to Lady Penelope Creighton-Ward of the Thunderbirds TV series. Her character rode a gadget-filled Rolls-Royce driven by an Aloysius Parker-type chauffeur played by Terry-Thomas.

The movie was filmed on location in Rio de Janeiro and Rome with Dino De Laurentiis spending a lot of money on production. Connors also recalled that he did the stuntwork of dangling from a rope ladder attached to a helicopter flying off the Christ the Redeemer statue in Rio when the local stuntman refused to do it. Connors said that they were the only film company ever granted permission to film at the landmark.

Titles during filming included Operation Paradise.

== Reception ==
Variety was critical of the film stating that "Dino De Laurentiis has made a limp, banal spy spoof, inept in all departments. Pace is plodding, dialog pallid, direction pedestrian, acting an embarrassment, and technical composition awkward." and that it was an "Unsatisfactory spy spoof for dual bills".

Sight and Sound called it a "Banal Italian-made spy spoof, a long way after That Man from Rio. Even the gadgets look tired."

Leonard Maltin's Movie Guide (2014 edition) gives Kiss the Girls and Make Them Die its lowest rating, BOMB, describing it as a "[D]ull spy spoof" and commenting that "a satellite capable of sterilizing the world" is "something Bond, Flint, and Matt Helm wouldn't mind. Awful film." Steven H. Scheuer's Movies on TV and Videocassette (1993–1994 edition) had a barely higher opinion, allowing 1½ stars (out of 4) and dispatching it with the final line, "[T]ongue-in-cheek secret-agent stuff doesn't come off: a yawn."

The Motion Picture Guide assigned the film its lowest ranking of 1 star (out of 5), proclaiming that "[T]here is little to recommend in this secret-agent spoof" and pointing out that "[E]verything from the sloppy special effects to the irritating music radiates an uncanny cheapness. Dubbed in English."

Two specialized guidebooks arrive at a split vote. Michael Weldon's Psychotronic Encyclopedia of Film (1983 edition, page 407) agrees with the denigrators, giving it a plot outline that ends with the words, "[T]he worst Bond imitation known to man. With Terry-Thomas, Margaret Lee, Beverly Adams, Marilu Tolo, Nazi scientists, and Communist Chinese. Filmed in Rio De Janeiro. Connors did Mannix next." On the other hand, John Stanley's Creature Features The Science Fiction, Fantasy, and Horror Movie Guide (2000 edition) decided that "[A]lthough a pale copy of 007's exploits, it has a sparkle to its comedy, gorgeous women in figure-flattering wardrobes, and scenic action set against picturesque Rio." After describing the plot, Stanley concludes with, "Michael Connors walks somnambulistic through his role as super agent Kelly who has minipistols hidden in his clothing and is always eating bananas. A standout is Terry-Thomas as a chauffeur secret agent. Directed by Henry Levin and Dino Maiuri. Dorothy Provine portrays Connors' charming, sexy contact."

The sole British cinema compiler to acknowledge the film, Leslie Halliwell in his 1985 Film and Video Guide 5th edition, gave no stars (Halliwell's top rating is 4), dismissing it as a "[P]atchy James Bond spoof."

== See also ==
- Outline of James Bond
- Eurospy

== Works cited ==
- Blake, Matt; Deal, David (2004). The Eurospy Guide. Baltimore: Luminary Press. ISBN 1-887664-52-1.
