= Rex Reason =

American actor (1928–2015)

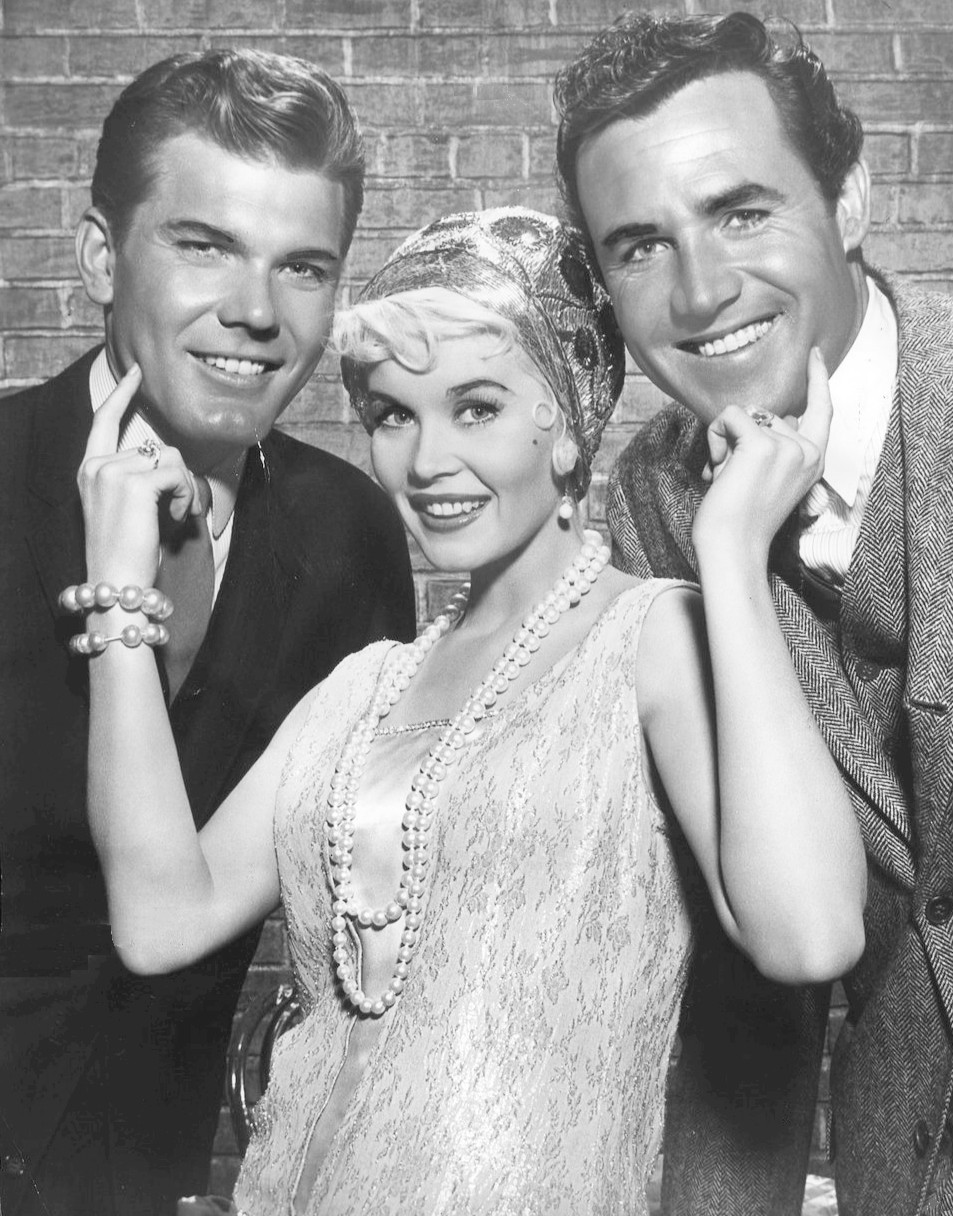
- Rex Reason (right) with The Roaring 20's co-stars Donald May and Dorothy Provine
- Born: November 30, 1928; Berlin, Germany
- Died: November 19, 2015 (aged 86); Walnut, California, U.S.
- Occupation: Actor
- Years active: 1952-1963
- Spouse(s): Joan Johannes (1952-1960) (divorced) 2 children Sanita Pelkey (1962-1963) (divorced); Shirley Hake (1965-2015; his death) 3 children
- Relatives: Rhodes Reason, brother

Rex George Reason Jr. (November 30, 1928 – November 19, 2015) was an American actor best known for his role in This Island Earth (1955). He was the elder brother of actor Rhodes Reason.

== Life and career ==
Reason was born in Berlin, Germany to an American family that returned to Los Angeles shortly thereafter, where Rex was raised. He attended Herbert Hoover High School in Glendale, California and enlisted in the United States Army at the age of seventeen, serving from 1946 to 1948.

He began his stage career in 1948 at the Pasadena Playhouse, performing there for three years before coming to the notice of Hollywood. In 1951 he was given a screen test at Columbia Pictures and was cast as the lead in a starring role in his first picture, a low-budget adventure drama Storm Over Tibet (1952) initially produced for MGM but acquired by Columbia Pictures. Reason was under contract for two more years at Columbia until moving to Universal-International in mid-1953, after making a promising appearance in the sword-and-sandal epic Salome (1953) with Rita Hayworth.

A tall (6'3"), handsome, leading man with a distinctive baritone speaking voice, Reason appeared in several films and television shows throughout the 1950s and 1960s. He made two pictures at Universal Studios under the name "Bart Roberts" before demanding to be able to use his own name.

Reason is perhaps best known for his role as stalwart, heroic scientist Dr. Cal Meacham in the science fiction movie This Island Earth (1955). Reason co-starred as sympathetic scientist Dr. Tom Morgan in the third—and final—installment of Universal International Pictures' Creature from the Black Lagoon horror film series in The Creature Walks Among Us (1956). He also appeared opposite Clark Gable and Sidney Poitier in Band of Angels (1957) for Warner Bros. He appeared in Badlands of Montana (1957) as an opponent of a corrupt Mayor played by John M. Pickard. In the story line, Pickard administers ten lashes with a whip to Reason's back.

Reason starred as newspapermen in two television series. The first of those was a syndicated western, Man Without a Gun (1957–1959), in the role of Adam MacLean, editor of the Yellowstone Sentinel newspaper in Dakota Territory. The second was the ABC/Warner Bros. Television drama, The Roaring Twenties (1960–1962), a crime drama in the role of Scott Norris, reporter for the fictitious New York Record.

He appeared as a guest on an NBC interview program, Here's Hollywood in 1961, and guest-starred on a number of other television series. In Perry Mason he played the role of defendant Steve Brock in the episode, "The Case of the Ancient Romeo" (1962) opposite Jeff Morrow, who had starred with him in This Island Earth. His final television appearance was in an episode of Wagon Train broadcast in 1963. He was also featured in episodes of Bourbon Street Beat, 77 Sunset Strip, and The Alaskans.

Reason walked out on his film contract with Warner Bros. in the fall of 1961 when he was being considered for a starring role in John Frankenheimer's The Manchurian Candidate (1962). The film began as a project at Warners, but was completed as an independent film and released by United Artists. Laurence Harvey was cast in the role instead.

After his film and television acting career ended, he worked as a real estate broker and had a second career as a voiceover actor. During his later years, Reason was in retirement and living in Walnut, California, with his third wife, Shirley.

== Death ==
Reason died in Walnut, California, from bladder cancer on November 19, 2015.
