= The Alaskans =

Television series (1959–1960)

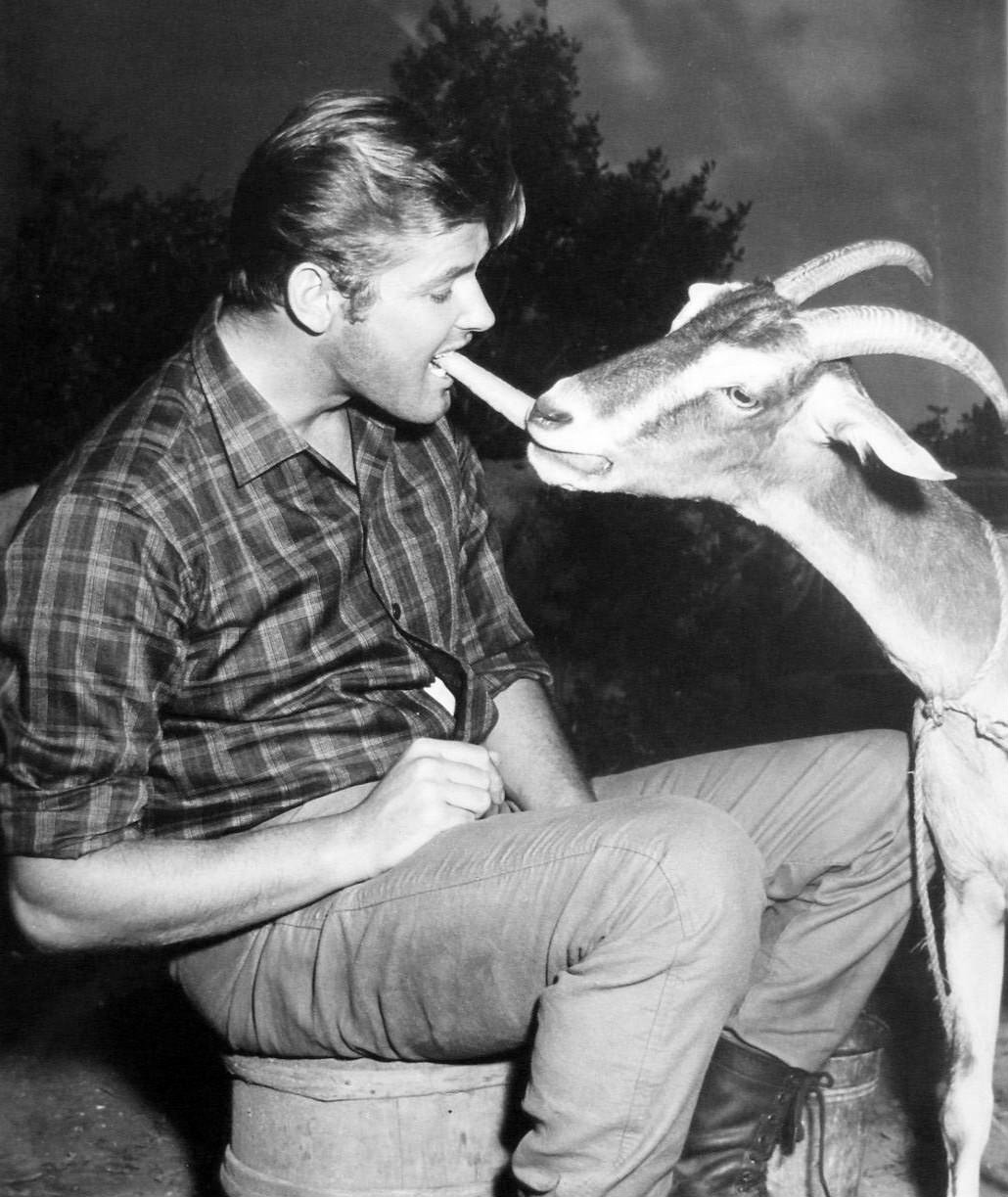
- Roger Moore on the set of The Alaskans, 1959
- Genre: Adventure; Western
- Directed by: Leslie Goodwins; Richard Gordon; Charles F. Haas; Jesse Hibbs; Leslie H. Martinson; William A. Seiter; Richard Sinclair; Robert Sparr; Herbert L. Strock; Jacques Tourneur; George Waggner
- Starring: Roger Moore; Dorothy Provine; Jeff York; Ray Danton
- Theme music composer: "Gold Fever" by Mack David and Jerry Livingston
- Composer: Max Steiner
- Country of origin: United States
- Original language: English
- No. of seasons: 1
- No. of episodes: 36

Production
- Executive producer: William T. Orr
- Producers: Barry Ingster; Harry Tatelman; Charles Trapnell; Oren W. Haglund (Production manager); Gordon Bau (make-up)
- Production location: California
- Editors: David Wages; Robert B. Warwick
- Running time: 49–51 minutes
- Production company: Warner Bros. Television

Original release
- Network: ABC
- Release: October 4, 1959 – June 19, 1960

Related
- Maverick; Bronco; Cheyenne; Sugarfoot

The Alaskans is a 1959–1960 ABC/Warner Bros. Western television series set during the late 1890s in the port of Skagway, Alaska. The show features Roger Moore as "Silky Harris" and Jeff York as "Reno McKee", a pair of adventurers intent on swindling travelers bound for the Yukon Territories during the height of the Klondike Gold Rush. Their plans are inevitably complicated by the presence of singer "Rocky Shaw" (Dorothy Provine), "an entertainer with a taste for the finer things in life".

The show was the first regular work on American television for the British actor Roger Moore.

== Background and production ==
The Alaskans is closely related to the ABC/WB series Maverick through broadcast and production. Maverick was the most prominent of ABC's Sunday night of Western dramas. For the 1959–60 season, Sundays began with Colt .45 and Maverick, then John Russell's Lawman and Nick Adams' The Rebel, and concluded with The Alaskans.

For Roger Moore, the series was memorable for being his "most appalling television series ever". In particular, he found that attempting to recreate Alaskan exteriors on a studio backlot in California made for disagreeably hot work days. The show also caused some marital strife for the actor when he had to admit to wife Dorothy Squires that he had fallen in love with co-star Dorothy Provine.

=== Writing ===
Because of the 1960 Writers Guild of America strike as well as an ongoing Warner Bros. policy to save money on writers, The Alaskans inherited a certain amount of scripted material from Maverick. Moore bristled at the lack of originality in scripts: "An old Bronco script would interchange with an Alaskans or Maverick. In some cases, even the dialogue stayed unchanged." In 2007, Moore noted, "Quite often I realized that we were filming Maverick scripts, with the names changed." This made it simple for Jack L. Warner to envision Moore as Maverick, since Moore had literally delivered Garner's dialogue while reshooting the same scripts with different names and locales.

Warner Brothers producers collectively used the name "W. Hermanos" (literally "W. Brothers") as the teleplay author of these lightly rewritten scripts. The practice also occurred on 77 Sunset Strip. Maverick and numberous other Warner Brothers shows of the era.

=== Cancellation ===
The same year that The Alaskans was canceled, James Garner left Maverick. Moore became, under protest, Garner's replacement, playing Bret Maverick's cousin Beau Maverick in the fourth season of Maverick.

== Cast ==
- Roger Moore as Silky Harris
- Dorothy Provine as Rocky Shaw
- Jeff York as Reno McKee
- Ray Danton as Nifty Cronin
- John Dehner in two episodes each as Cornish and Soapy Smith

== Guest stars ==
- Fred Aldrich
- Julie Adams
- Claude Akins
- Robert Anderson
- Baynes Barron
- Don Beddoe
- Jacqueline Beer
- Rudy Bowman
- Steve Brodie
- Joe Brooks
- Walter Burke
- Frank Cady
- Spencer Chan
- James Chandler
- Tris Coffin
- Robert Colbert
- Richard Collier
- Bill Coontz
- Jerome Cowan
- Richard H. Cutting
- John Dehner
- Frank DeKova
- Troy Donahue
- James Coburn
- Don Dubbins
- Frank Ferguson
- Duke Fishman
- Arthur Franz
- Leo Gordon
- Alan Hale Jr.
- Myron Healey
- Tom Hennesy
- Clyde Howdy
- Clegg Hoyt
- John Hoyt
- Dale Ishimoto
- I. Stanford Jolley
- Allyn Joslyn
- Andrea King
- Werner Klemperer
- Lou Krugman
- Nolan Leary
- Ruta Lee
- Andra Martin
- Ken Mayer
- Diane McBain
- Rod McGaughy
- Robert McQueeney
- Frank Mills
- Mort Mills
- Gerald Mohr
- Simon Oakland
- Joan O'Brien
- Gregg Palmer
- Jerry Paris
- Emory Parnell
- Lee Patterson
- Wynn Pearce
- Larry Pennell
- Louis Quinn
- Gilman Rankin
- Rex Reason
- Mike Road
- Madlyn Rhue
- Bing Russell
- Walter Sande
- Dick Sargent
- Frank J. Scannell
- Pippa Scott
- Fred Sherman
- Rudy Sooter
- Fay Spain
- Paul Stader
- Karen Steele
- Warren Stevens
- Harold J. Stone
- Ray Teal
- Kelly Thordsen
- Lee Van Cleef
- Gary Vinson
- Richard Webb
- James Westerfield
- Peter Whitney
- Marie Windsor
- Tony Young
- Efrem Zimbalist Jr.

== Episodes ==
No.	Title	Directed by	Written by	Original release date
1	"Gold Sled"	Józef Lejtes	Lowell Barrington & Harry Whittington (novelette)	October 4, 1959
2	"Cheating Cheaters"	George waGGner	James O'Hanlon	October 11, 1959
3	"The Devil Made Five"	Jacques Tourneur	Bret Harte (story) & Harold Medford	October 18, 1959
4	"The Petticoat Crew"	Robert Gordon	Pat Fielder & Gibson Fox	October 25, 1959
5	"Starvation Stampede"	Robert Gordon	Talbot Jennings & Dick Nelson	November 1, 1959
6	"Big Deal"	Robert Gordon	Catherine Kuttner	November 8, 1959
7	"Contest at Gold Bottom"	William A. Seiter	Story by : Marion W. Horvitz; Teleplay by : Samuel F. Roeca and Marion W. Horvitz	November 15, 1959
8	"Winter Song"	Leslie H. Martinson	Talbot Jennings	November 22, 1959
9	"The Golden Fleece"	Leslie H. Martinson	Story by : Jack Emanuel and Joel Rogosin; Teleplay by : Samuel F. Roeca	November 29, 1959
10	"Doc Booker"	Robert Gordon	Steven Ritch	December 6, 1959
11	"The Abominable Snowman"	Lew Landers	Story by : Herb Golden; Teleplay by : Laszlo Gorog	December 13, 1959
12	"Remember the Maine"	Everett Sloane	Herman Epstein	December 20, 1959
13	"Million Dollar Kid"	George waGGner	Story by : David Newhouse; Teleplay by : Samuel F. Roeca	January 3, 1960
14	"The Trial of Reno McKee"	Lew Landers	Story by : Dick Nelson; Teleplay by : Robert E. Thompson	January 10, 1960
15	"Gold Fever"	Lew Landers	Story by : Harry Tatelman; Teleplay by : Samuel F. Roeca and William Driskill	January 17, 1960
16	"The Challenge"	Lew Landers	Story by : David Newhouse; Teleplay by : Laszlo Gorog	January 24, 1960
17	"The Long Pursuit"	Leslie H. Martinson	Story by : Steve Frazee and Lee Loeb; Teleplay by : Lee Loeb	January 31, 1960
18	"Spring Fever"	Lew Landers	Story by : Leslie H. Martinson; Teleplay by : Oscar Brodney	February 7, 1960
19	"Black Sand"	Robert T. Sparr	Story by : Hugh Benson; Teleplay by : Leonard Heideman	February 14, 1960
20	"The Seal Skin-Game"	Leslie Goodwins	Buckley Angell	February 21, 1960
21	"Peril at Caribou Crossing"	Lew Landers	Story by : Boris Ingster; Teleplay by : Herman Epstein	February 28, 1960
22	"Behind the Moon"	Charles Haas	Story by : Boris Ingster and Dick Nelson; Teleplay by : Samuel F. Roeca	March 6, 1960
23	"Partners"	Herbert L. Strock	Jo Conway	March 13, 1960
24	"Disaster at Gold Hill"	George waGGner	Catherine Kuttner	March 20, 1960
25	"The Last Bullet"	Charles Haas	Story by : Maurita Pittman; Teleplay by : Russell Hughes and W. Hermanos	March 27, 1960
26	"A Barrel of Gold"	Reginald LeBorg	Melvin Levy	April 3, 1960
27	"The Bride Wore Black"	Charles Haas	Story by : Sig Herzig; Teleplay by : W. Hermanos	April 10, 1960
28	"Odd Man Hangs"	Lew Landers	Story by : Ralph Berard; Teleplay by : Tom Blackburn and W. Hermanos	April 17, 1960
29	"Counterblow"	Leslie Goodwins	Story by : Burt Arthur; Teleplay by : Bernie Giler and W. Hermanos	April 24, 1960
30	"Heart of Gold"	Robert B. Sinclair	W. Hermanos	May 1, 1960
31	"Kangaroo Court"	Jesse Hibbs	Story by : Edward E. Seabrook & Homer McCoy & Oscar Millard; Teleplay by : Robert Schaefer & Eric Freiwald & Robert Smith	May 8, 1960
32	"The Silent Land"	Lew Landers	W. Hermanos	May 15, 1960
33	"Calico"	Robert B. Sinclair	Story by : Maurita Pittman; Teleplay by : W. Hermanos	May 22, 1960
34	"Sign of the Kodiak"	Lew Landers	W. Hermanos	May 29, 1960
35	"White Vengeance"	Lew Landers	Story by : Raphael Hayes; Teleplay by : Raphael Hayes and W. Hermanos	June 5, 1960
36	"The Ballad of Whitehorse"	Charles Haas	W. Hermanos	June 12, 1960

== Home media ==
The Alaskans was released on Blu-ray by the Warner Archive Collection on August 27, 2024.
