= Never a Dull Moment (1968 film) =

1968 Walt Disney film directed by Jerry Paris

- Official re-release poster
- Directed by: Jerry Paris
- Written by: A. J. Carothers
- Based on: The Reluctant Assassin by John Godey (Morton Freedgood)
- Produced by: Ron Miller
- Starring: Dick Van Dyke; Edward G. Robinson; Dorothy Provine
- Cinematography: William E. Snyder
- Edited by: Marsh Hendry
- Music by: Robert F. Brunner
- Production company: Walt Disney Productions
- Distributed by: Buena Vista Distribution
- Release date: June 26, 1968
- Running time: 100 minutes
- Country: United States
- Language: English
- Box office: $4,150,000 (US/ Canada rentals)

Never a Dull Moment is a 1968 American heist comedy crime film from Walt Disney Productions starring Dick Van Dyke and Edward G. Robinson and directed by Jerry Paris. The script by A. J. Carothers was based on The Reluctant Assassin by John Godey. The supporting cast features Dorothy Provine, Henry Silva, Slim Pickens and Jack Elam. Master cartoonist Floyd Gottfredson created a comic strip, Astro Pooch, to be used as a prop in the film.

It is the first film from Walt Disney Productions to not be produced by Walt Disney, who had died two years earlier.

== Plot ==
Second-rate actor Jack Albany finds himself mistaken for fiendish killer Ace Williams and whisked off to master gangster Leo Smooth's fortified mansion. He is forced to continue with the charade, even when he finds he is to play a deadly role in the theft of the painting Field of Sunflowers, a 40 foot long masterpiece. Sally, an art teacher, is a potential ally for Jack.

Further complications ensue when the real Ace Williams shows up, making it even more difficult for Albany to keep up his false identity. Eventually, Albany outwits the gangsters and foils the robbery.

== Cast ==
- Dick Van Dyke as Jack Albany
- Edward G. Robinson as Leo Joseph Smooth
- Dorothy Provine as Sally Inwood
- Henry Silva as Frank Boley
- Joanna Cook Moore as Melanie Smooth
- Tony Bill as Florian
- Slim Pickens as Cowboy Schaeffer
- Jack Elam as Ace Williams
- Ned Glass as Rinzy Tobreski
- Richard Bakalyan as Bobby Macoon
- Mickey Shaughnessy as Francis
- Philip Coolidge as Fingers Felton
- James Millhollin as Museum Director
- Eleanor Audley as Society Matron

== Reception ==
Howard Thompson of The New York Times gave Never a Dull Moment a largely negative review, calling it "good-natured" but claiming that "most of it seems mighty strenuous and over-worked". Thompson saved most of his praise for the cartoon that accompanied the film, a reissue of Disney's Three Little Pigs from 1933 (this short also accompanied releases of The One and Only, Genuine, Original Family Band in some cities). Arthur D. Murphy of Variety called it "a very amusing crime comedy" if "a bit long and talky". Charles Champlin of the Los Angeles Times declared it "the breeziest and most likeable Disney comedy in some time, with a verve and (relative) sophistication which can engage the favoring interest of the grown-ups as well as the moppets". Clifford Terry of the Chicago Tribune wrote that "the Disney studio comedy starts off amusingly enough, then loses its freshness after the first half hour. But the kids probably won't notice." The Monthly Film Bulletin stated: "With no pretensions to being anything but a rollicking farce, this slight but intermittently amusing comedy largely succeeds on its own modest level." The San Francisco Examiner's Jeanne Miller panned the film, writing that "all but the very young will probably take issue with the title of Never a Dull Moment, which opened yesterday at the Fox-Warfield. For things get very dull indeed in this uninspired, cliche-ridden spoof about a band of zany gangsters who plan the heist of a Manhattan art museum. Of course, the movie was designed by the Walt Disney Studio for the kiddies' summer vacation. But all the wacky misadventures must surely be familiar to the moppets who have seen them over and over again on their TV sets."

== See also ==
- List of American films of 1968
- List of Walt Disney Pictures films
- The Umbrella Coup (1980)
