= Carla Borelli =

American actress

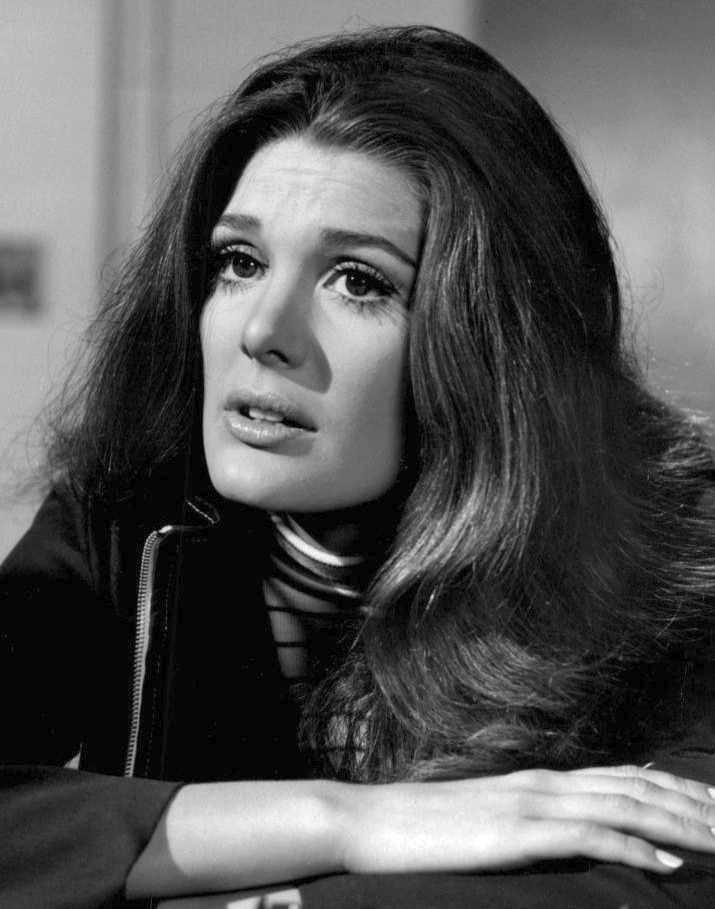
- Borelli in 1970
- Born: Joyce Carla Borelli; October 12, 1942 (age 83); San Francisco, California, United States
- Occupation: Actress
- Years active: 1960–2004
- Known for: Another World; Texas
- Spouses: John Demorest (m. 1963; div. 1982): Donald May (until 2022; his death)

Carla Borelli (born October 12, 1942 in San Francisco, California) is an American actress.

Borelli is one of five children born to parents who had been in the grocery business since the early 1930s. She was modeling as a baby and studied ballet at age 12.

Borelli played Lisa Vincent in The Betty White Show on CBS (1977–1978). Her early television appearances included one episode of The Wild Wild West ("The Night of Montezuma's Hordes", 1967), an episode on Mannix ("Color Her Missing", S3-Episode 02, 1969), two episodes of Ironside ("Ransom", 1970, and "The Quincunx", 1971), and the two-part 1971 episode "The Banker" of The Silent Force. She appeared in three episodes of the NBC series The Name of the Game, each as different characters. In 1975, she appeared in Season 1, Episode 3 of a One Day at a Time episode entitled "Jealousy" as a model named Candy. In 1977, she appeared in a first-season episode of "Charlie's Angels" entitled "The Vegas Connection."

From 1979 to 1982, Borelli played the part of Reena Bellman Cook Dekker on the daytime soaps Another World and Texas. She also played Ruth Bannister in Season 2 of Adam-12, "Log 24: A Rare Occasion." Borelli is possibly best known for her role as Connie Giannini in the 1980s television series Falcon Crest. She also played the female lead in William Girdler's first directorial effort, Asylum of Satan (1972).

On the big screen, in 1969 she starred as “Erica Lane” in the Don Knotts comedy movie The Love God?.

Borelli was married to the actor Donald May.
