= The Bonnie Parker Story =

1958 film

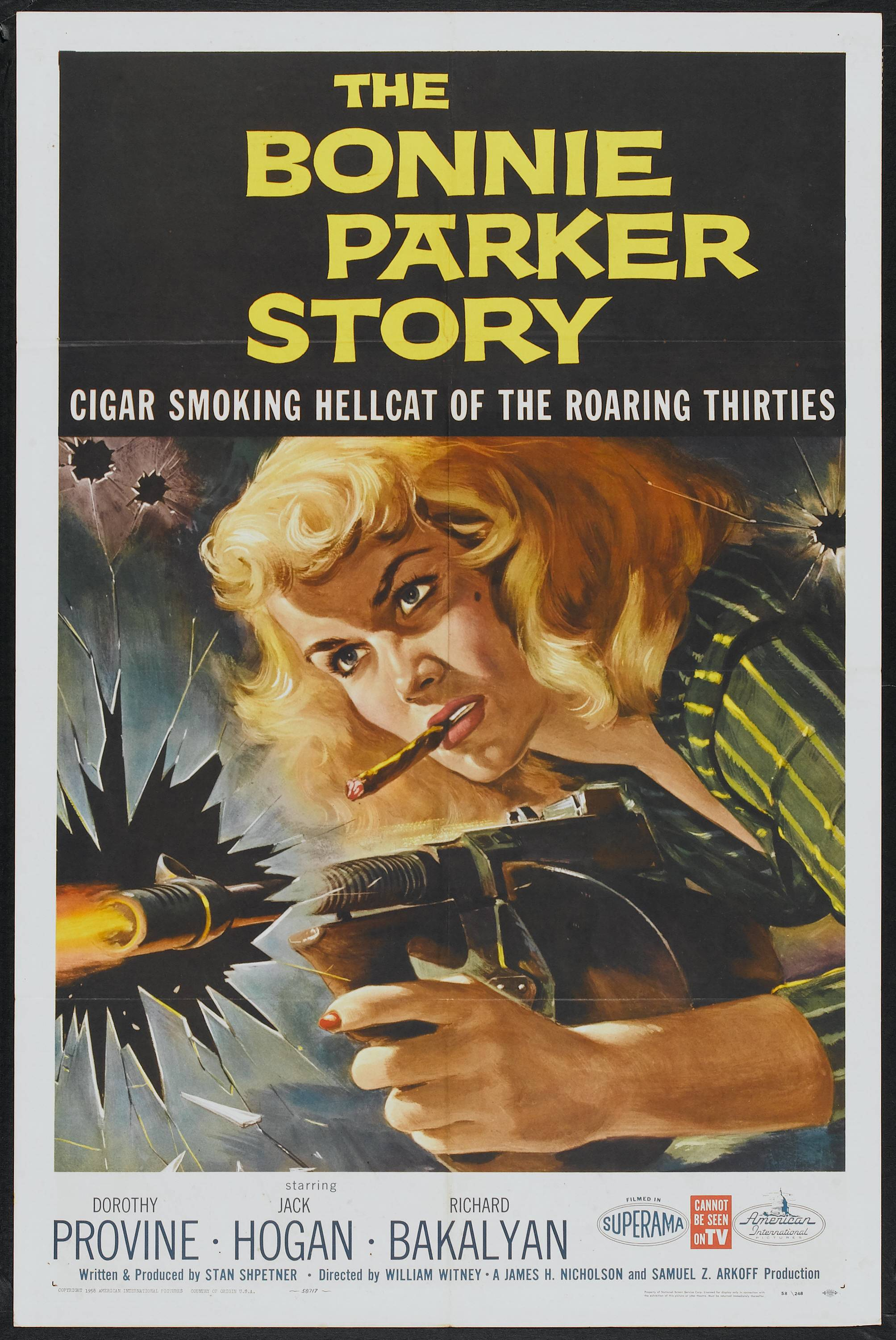
- Theatrical release poster by Reynold Brown
- Directed by: William Witney
- Written by: Stanley Shpetner
- Produced by: Stanley Shpetner
- Starring: Dorothy Provine; Jack Hogan; Richard Bakalyan
- Cinematography: Jack A. Marta
- Edited by: Frank P. Keller
- Music by: Ronald Stein
- Production company: Albany Productions
- Distributed by: American International Pictures
- Release date: April 28, 1958
- Running time: 79 minutes
- Country: United States
- Language: English

The Bonnie Parker Story is a 1958 American crime film directed by William Witney. The movie is loosely based on the life of Bonnie Parker, a well-known outlaw of the 1930s. The film stars Dorothy Provine as Parker; Parker's actual historical partner, Clyde Barrow, is renamed Guy Darrow for the film's story, and played by Jack Hogan. The film was released by American International Pictures as a double feature with Machine Gun Kelly starring Charles Bronson in his first leading role.

== Plot ==
Diner waitress Bonnie Parker is just as tired of her job in 1932 Texas as she is of customers like Guy Darrow, who try too hard to make her acquaintance. When she goes too far, fending off Guy with hot oil, Bonnie is fired.

With her husband Duke Jefferson still in prison and no means of support, Bonnie teams up with Guy on a series of small holdups. She also kills a cop who is chasing them, which leads to Tom Steel of the Texas Rangers, a fictionalized version of Frank Hamer, being assigned to the case.

Guy's incarcerated cousin Chuck is paroled in late 1933, so Bonnie and the Darrows travel north to Missouri and Iowa for more robberies. Bonnie thinks it is time to stop thinking small and aim for banks instead of gas stations and such. She also decides the gang should bust Duke out of the pen.

Their daring breakout succeeds, but Chuck is shot. Now that her husband is in charge, the trio begins making some big scores and become America's most wanted criminals. But when a big scheme by Bonnie to rob an armored truck backfires, the guards locking themselves inside a vehicle that is bulletproof, things continue to go wrong when Guy accidentally kills Duke.

On the lam, Bonnie decides it is time to hide out in Louisiana, but it is only a matter of time before Steel and the Rangers find them. Bonnie and Guy go down in a hail of bullets.

== Cast ==
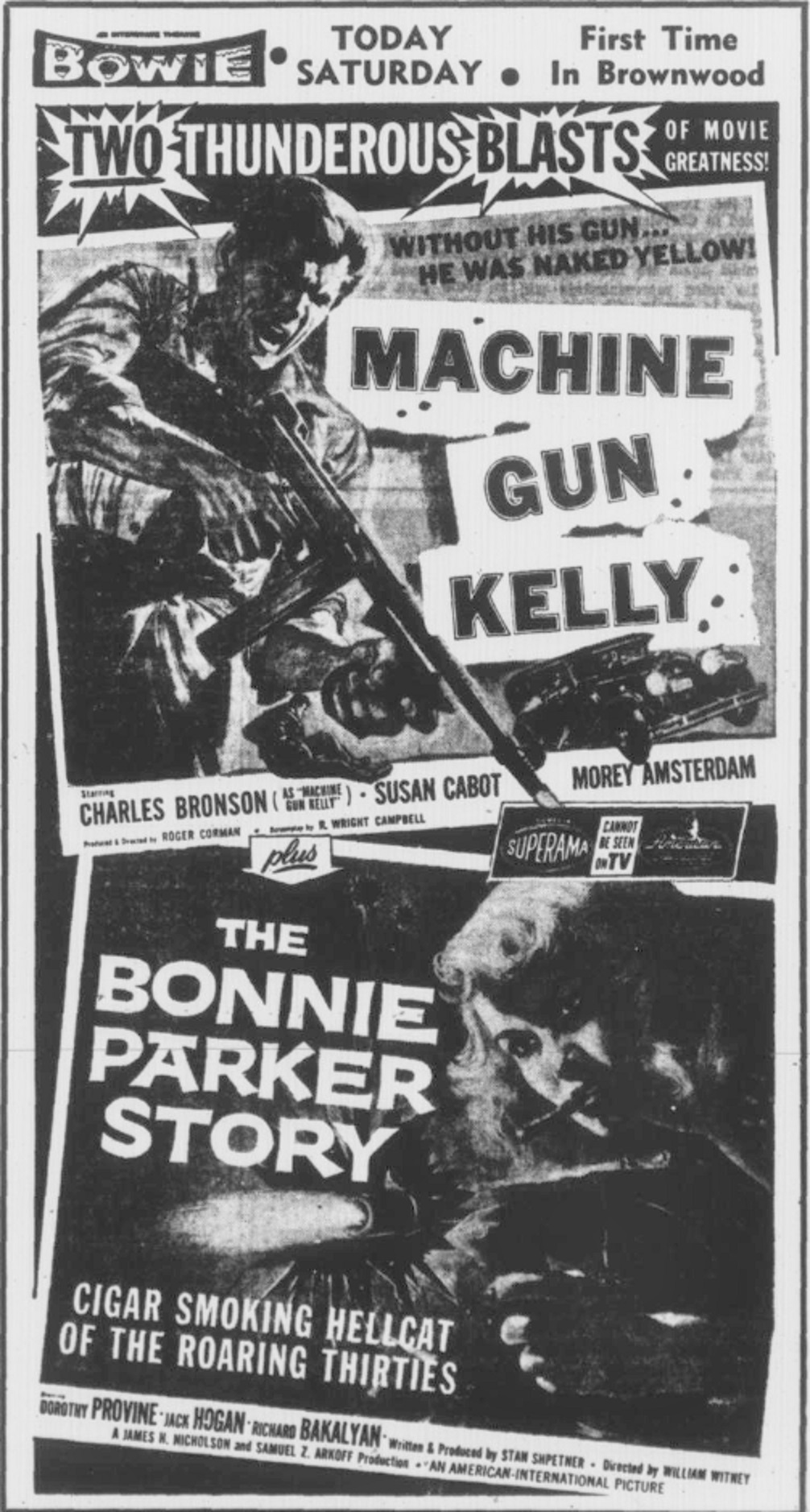
Advertisement from 1958 for The Bonnie Parker Story and co-feature, Machine-Gun Kelly.

- Dorothy Provine as Bonnie Parker
- Jack Hogan as Guy Darrow
- Richard Bakalyan as Duke Jefferson
- Joe Turkel as Chuck Darrow
- William Stevens as Paul Baxter
- Douglas Kennedy as Tom Steel
- Patricia Huston as Chuck's Girl
- Jim Beck as Alvin

== Critical response ==
In her review of the 1967 film Bonnie and Clyde, Pauline Kael dismissed The Bonnie Parker Story as "a cheap - in every sense - 1958 exploitation film."

Recent critics have been more enthusiastic. Bob Mastrangelo wrote, "The Bonnie Parker Story is an obscure oddity that exists in the shadow of the far better known Bonnie and Clyde, but this little film is also able to stand on its own legs."

Quentin Tarantino considers the film's director, William Witney, to be a "lost master"; he's quoted as saying of this film that, "I was blown away. It was like, whoa, who made this? I have to see everything he ever did."

Elaine Lemmon wrote in Senses of Cinema that, "Other than the predictable final shoot-out, The Bonnie Parker Story bears no other resemblances to the later film, especially in terms of visual style, where it remains strictly in the B-movie tradition of American International Pictures, its production company. However, it is told and shot with verve, and is pleasingly lurid, with an appropriately vivacious characterisation by Dorothy Provine."

== See also ==
- Bonnie and Clyde (1967 film directed by Arthur Penn).
