= One Spy Too Many =

- Directed by: Joseph Sargent
- Written by: Dean Hargrove
- Produced by: David Victor
- Starring: Robert Vaughn; David McCallum; Rip Torn; Dorothy Provine
- Cinematography: Fred J. Koenekamp
- Edited by: Henry Berman
- Music by: Gerald Fried
- Distributed by: Metro-Goldwyn-Mayer
- Release date: February 28, 1966
- Running time: 102 min.
- Country: United States
- Language: English

One Spy Too Many, starring Robert Vaughn and David McCallum, is a 1966 spy film. It is the 1966 feature-length film version of The Man from U.N.C.L.E.'s two-part season two premiere "Alexander the Greater Affair". It is the third such feature film that used as its basis a reedited version of one or more episodes from the series. In this instance, the film took the two-part episode and added in a subplot featuring Yvonne Craig as Maude Waverly, an U.N.C.L.E. operative carrying on a flirtatious relationship with Napoleon Solo (Robert Vaughn); Craig does not appear in the television episodes. Both episodes were written by Dean Hargrove and directed by Joseph Sargent.

It also added in and substituted scenes that, while not out of place in a 1960s U.S. spy film, were more explicitly sexual than generally shown on U.S. television at the time. Whereas the earlier U.N.C.L.E. films added material to a single episode to create a feature-length movie, One Spy Too Many removed certain elements of the two-part episode, scenes with Alexander (Rip Torn)'s parents Harry (Charles Seel) and Miriam Baxter (Madge Blake) to allow for the added subplot with Craig and other enhanced scenes within the film's overall running time. This was the last film culled from the series to be theatrically released in the U.S. (in late 1966).

== Plot ==
The film opens with Alexander stealing a chemical weapon from a military base. The weapon causes an enemy's troops to lose the will to fight, thereby making conquest in battle far easier. This is part of Alexander's dual goal: to conquer the world in the manner of Alexander the Great and to break each of the major moral codes in so doing (which essentially means the Ten Commandments).

U.N.C.L.E. becomes involved after the theft of the weapon and agents Napoleon Solo and Illya Kuryakin are assigned. Also searching for Alexander is his estranged wife Tracey, although her motive is to serve him with divorce papers. Through a series of coincidences (and Tracey's focused efforts to trail the U.N.C.L.E agents to find her husband), Solo, Kuryakin and Tracey end up joining forces. As a result, they are at various times captured, tortured, left to die in an elaborate way in an Egyptian tomb, and otherwise thwarted by Alexander.

Alexander believes that if he is able to assist a military junta in the takeover of a small country (implied to be Vietnam) he can use that country as a base for world conquest. By careful planning, he combines his final violation of a commandment - killing the country's leader General Bon Phouma - with the takeover of the country and the start of his march toward global domination. Intervention by U.N.C.L.E. prevents the assassination, and during his escape Alexander is killed by his own accomplice Kavon.

== Cast ==
- Robert Vaughn as Napoleon Solo
- David McCallum as Illya Kuryakin
- Rip Torn as Alexander
- Dorothy Provine as Tracey Alexander
- Leo G. Carroll as Alexander Waverly
- Yvonne Craig as Maude Waverly
- David Opatoshu as Mr. Kavon
- David Sheiner as Parviz
- James Hong as Prince Phanong
- Donna Michelle as Princess Nicole
- Leon Lontoc as General Bon Phouma
- Cal Bolder as Ingo Lindstrum

== See also ==
- List of American films of 1966
