= Badlands of Montana =

1957 film by Daniel B. Ullman

- Theatrical release poster
- Directed by: Daniel B. Ullman
- Written by: Daniel B. Ullman
- Produced by: Daniel B. Ullman
- Starring: Rex Reason; Margia Dean; Beverly Garland; Keith Larsen
- Cinematography: Frederick Gately
- Edited by: Neil Brunnenkant
- Music by: Irving Gertz
- Color process: Black and white
- Production company: Regal Films Inc
- Distributed by: 20th Century Fox
- Release date: May 1, 1957
- Running time: 75 minutes
- Country: United States
- Language: English

Badlands of Montana is a 1957 American Western film written, produced and directed by Daniel B. Ullman and starring Rex Reason, Margia Dean, Beverly Garland and Keith Larsen.

== Plot ==
The plot follows Steven Brewster, a mayoral candidate who is tricked into a gunfight and kills his opponent. He then takes up with a gang of badlands outlaws and takes part in robberies. After being wounded and captured, his friends rescue him and bring him back to Helena where he is elected sheriff.

== Cast ==
- Rex Reason as Steven Brewster
- Margia Dean as Emily Branton
- Beverly Garland as Susan Hammer
- Keith Larsen as Rick Valentine
- Emile Meyer as Henry Harrison Hammer
- William Edward Phipps as Walt Branton
- Stanley Farrar as Jake Rayburn
- Rankin Mansfield as Doc Travis
- John Pickard as Vince Branton
- Ralph Peters as Sammy Fielding
- Paul Newlan as Marshal at Helena
- Russ Bender as George Johannson
- Robert Cunningham as Paul Johansson
- Jack Kruschen as Cavalry Sergeant
