= Storm Over Tibet =

1952 film by Andrew Marton

- Directed by: Andrew Marton
- Screenplay by: Ivan Tors; Sam Meyer
- Produced by: Ivan Tors; Laszlo Benedek
- Starring: Rex Reason; Diana Douglas
- Cinematography: George E. Diskant; Richard Angst
- Edited by: John Hoffman
- Music by: Arthur Honegger; Leith Stevens
- Production company: Summit Productions
- Distributed by: Columbia Pictures
- Release date: July 1952
- Running time: 87 minutes
- Country: United States
- Language: English

Storm Over Tibet is a 1952 American adventure film directed by Andrew Marton and starring Rex Reason and Diana Douglas.

== Plot ==
American David Simms comes down a mountain before collapsing in a village. The residents carry him to a monastery. As he recovers, a flashback ensues.

During World War II, David is one of the many pilots flying from India over the Himalayan Mountains ferrying supplies to the Chinese in their war against the Japanese invaders. After his next flight, he gets to go home, taking along a religious mask he stole from the monastery.

His friend and co-pilot, Bill March, insists he return the mask. David is cut when they struggle over it. As a result, he is ordered to see the doctor, and March takes his place on the mission. The plane goes off-course and crashes somewhere around the mountain Amne Mandu. David wonders if the mask, which was on the plane, is responsible. He tries to pay restitution to a monk, but the man rejects his offer.

With the war over, David cannot shake his guilt over his friend's death. He goes to Los Angeles to see March's widow, Elaine. At first, he cannot bring himself to recount his story; he goes on seeing her and eventually is able to tell her, but by then they have fallen in love. They get married.

Then a package addressed to Elaine March arrives; it contains the mask. They conclude only Bill could have sent it. David decides to join a scientific expedition going into the region. Elaine insists on accompanying him.

While watching a native ceremony, David sees a dancer wearing a mask much like the one he stole. He approaches the dancer, then has a vision of an avalanche. Afterward, a translator warns the expedition that the lama says the god of Amne Mandu is displeased and "the mountains will shake you down like so many ants." Both Elaine and the lama try to get David to abandon his quest, but he persists.

An avalanche does occur. Their porters refuse to go further until Professor Faber, the leader of the expedition, raises their wages. Then they discover that much of their kerosene, which they need to cook their food and provide light, has been replaced by water, for profit or out of dread of offending the mountain gods. When she hears the news, Mrs. Faber organizes porters to replenish their supply.

Despite more hardships and dangers, David finally comes within sight of the wreckage of the plane, only to see another avalanche bury it. Nonetheless, he experiences a strange feeling of relief; he is not fated to die on Amne Mandu. When he returns to the village, the lama informs him that they recovered the body of his friend long ago. It was the lama who sent David the mask, so that he could free himself from his guilt.

== Cast ==
- Rex Reason as David Simms
- Diana Douglas as Elaine March Simms
- Myron Healey as Bill March (as Myron Healy)
- Robert Karnes as Radio Operator
- Strother Martin as Co-pilot
- Harold Fong as Sergeant Lee
- Harold Dyrenforth as Professor Faber
- Jarmila Marton as Mrs. Faber
- William Schallert as Aylen
- John Dodsworth as Malloy
- Marcella Concepcion as High Lama (as M. Concepcion)

== Production ==
The film used footage filmed by Andrew Marton of the 1934 International Himalayan Expedition led by Norman Dyrenforth, whose son Harold Dyrenforth played a character based on his father. Much of the footage appeared in Marton's 1935 Swiss-German film Demon of the Himalayas with some sequences reused by Columbia in their 1937 film Lost Horizon. Actor Rex Reason made his debut in the film telling an interviewer he was chosen for his role because the film needed an actor who could physically fit the shots of the previous actor who had died. Reason's 27 minutes of footage included climbing sequences filmed in an indoor studio using white painted corn flakes as snow.

Arthur Honegger reused some of his score from Demon of the Himalayas.

== See also ==
- List of American films of 1952

== Bibliography ==
- Greene, Naomi. From Fu Manchu to Kung Fu Panda: Images of China in American Film. Hong Kong University Press, 2014.
