= Donald May =

American actor (1929–2022)

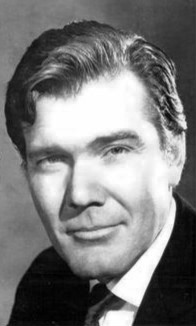
- May in 1971
- Born: February 22, 1929; Chicago, Illinois, U.S.
- Died: January 28, 2022 (aged 92); Kent, New York, U.S.
- Education: University of Oklahoma
- Occupation: Actor
- Years active: 1956–1993
- Known for: The Edge of Night
- Spouse(s): Ellen Cameron (m. 1951; div. 1984) Carla Borelli
- Children: 2

Donald Adam May (February 22, 1929 – January 28, 2022) was an American actor who was known for his roles in Colt .45 (1957–1960) and The Edge of Night.

== Early years ==
May was born in Chicago, Illinois, the son of Leontine Frances (Torczynski) and Harry Stuart May. He attended elementary school in Houston, Texas, and graduated from Shaker Heights High School in Cleveland, Ohio. In 1949, he graduated from the University of Oklahoma with a bachelor of arts degree.

May joined the U.S. Navy in 1951 and was discharged in 1955, serving as an officer.

== Career ==
Before he finished college, May acted in summer stock theater in Surrey, Maine, in 1948. After graduation, he acted on stage in Albany, New York, and Brattleboro, Vermont. He also acted in Signal Corps films.

May's first credited role was in 1956–1957 as Cadet Charles C. Thompson, the host of the ABC military drama series The West Point Story.

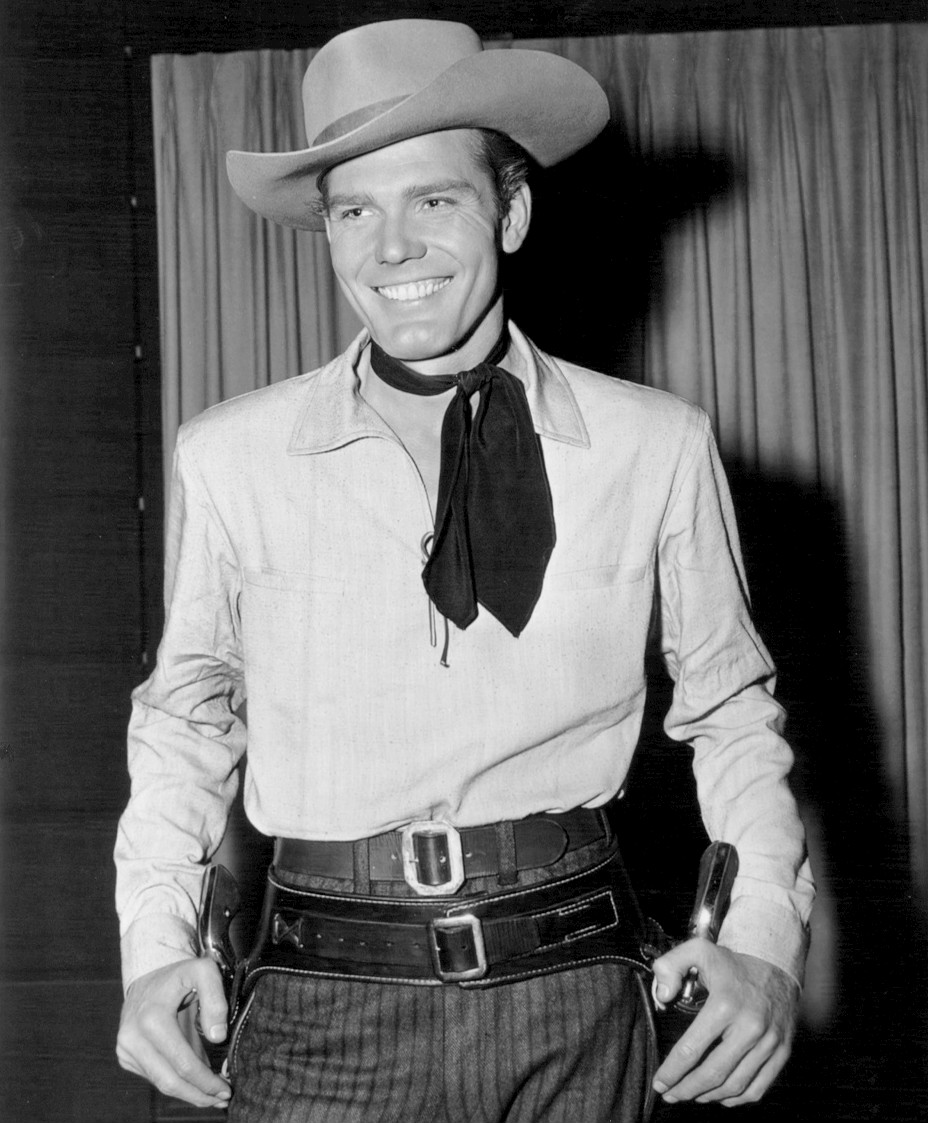
Donald May as Sam Colt, Jr. in Colt .45

In 1959–1960, May temporarily replaced Wayde Preston as the lead in four episodes of the ABC/Warner Brothers western television series, Colt .45. May portrayed "Sam Colt, Jr.," cousin to Preston's character, Christopher Colt.

He subsequently appeared in several other ABC/WB series, Sugarfoot, Cheyenne (as a young man plotting revenge in the episode "The Long Rope"), 77 Sunset Strip, Hawaiian Eye, Surfside 6, and The Roaring 20s, in which he was cast from 1960 to 1962 in forty-two episodes in the recurring role of fictitious newspaper reporter Pat Garrison. One of his principal co-stars on The Roaring 20s was Dorothy Provine.

In 1962, May made a television pilot in which he played a physician, Paul Larson, in the episode "County General" that was screened as an episode of ABC's drama series, Bus Stop, starring Marilyn Maxwell. That same year, he was cast as Major Thompson in "Any Second Now" of the ABC war drama, Combat!. In 1964, he portrayed Thatcher in the three-part episode, "The Tenderfoot" of NBC's Walt Disney's Wonderful World of Color. He was cast in 1964 in two other films, as Captain Anderson in A Tiger Walks, and as Secret Service agent John O'Connor in Kisses for My President, with Polly Bergen as the first woman President of the United States, with Fred MacMurray as "First Husband." Two years later, May was cast as Edward White Jr., with, again, Fred MacMurray in the lead, in the film about the Boy Scouts of America, Follow Me, Boys!. In 1965 May made another unsuccessful TV pilot Dream Wife as the husband of psychic Shirley Jones.

May subsequently guest starred on CBS's Men into Space, Barnaby Jones, The Dukes of Hazzard, Dallas, and Falcon Crest. He appeared on ABC's Fantasy Island. May was featured in several soap operas, including his role from 1967 to 1977 of crime busting lawyer, Adam Drake in The Edge of Night. He played Grant Wheeler in 1981–1982 on the Another World spinoff Texas. He also had recurring roles in One Life to Live and All My Children.

May's last screen role was in 1993 as Andrew Laraby in the episode "Come Rain or Come Schein" on the NBC legal drama, L.A. Law.

== Personal life and death ==
His first marriage was to Ellen Cameron from 1951 until 1984, when they divorced. They had two sons. Cameron appeared on screen only once—in an episode of ABC's Arrest and Trial. After his divorce from Cameron, May was married to Carla Borelli, an actress who also appeared in the television series Texas and Falcon Crest.

He died from laryngeal cancer at his home in Kent, New York, on January 28, 2022, at the age of 92.

== External sources ==
- Donald May at IMDb
- "Donald May". The New York Times. Archived from the original on March 23, 2011.
- Clips from Texas episodes
