= The Roaring 20's (TV series) =

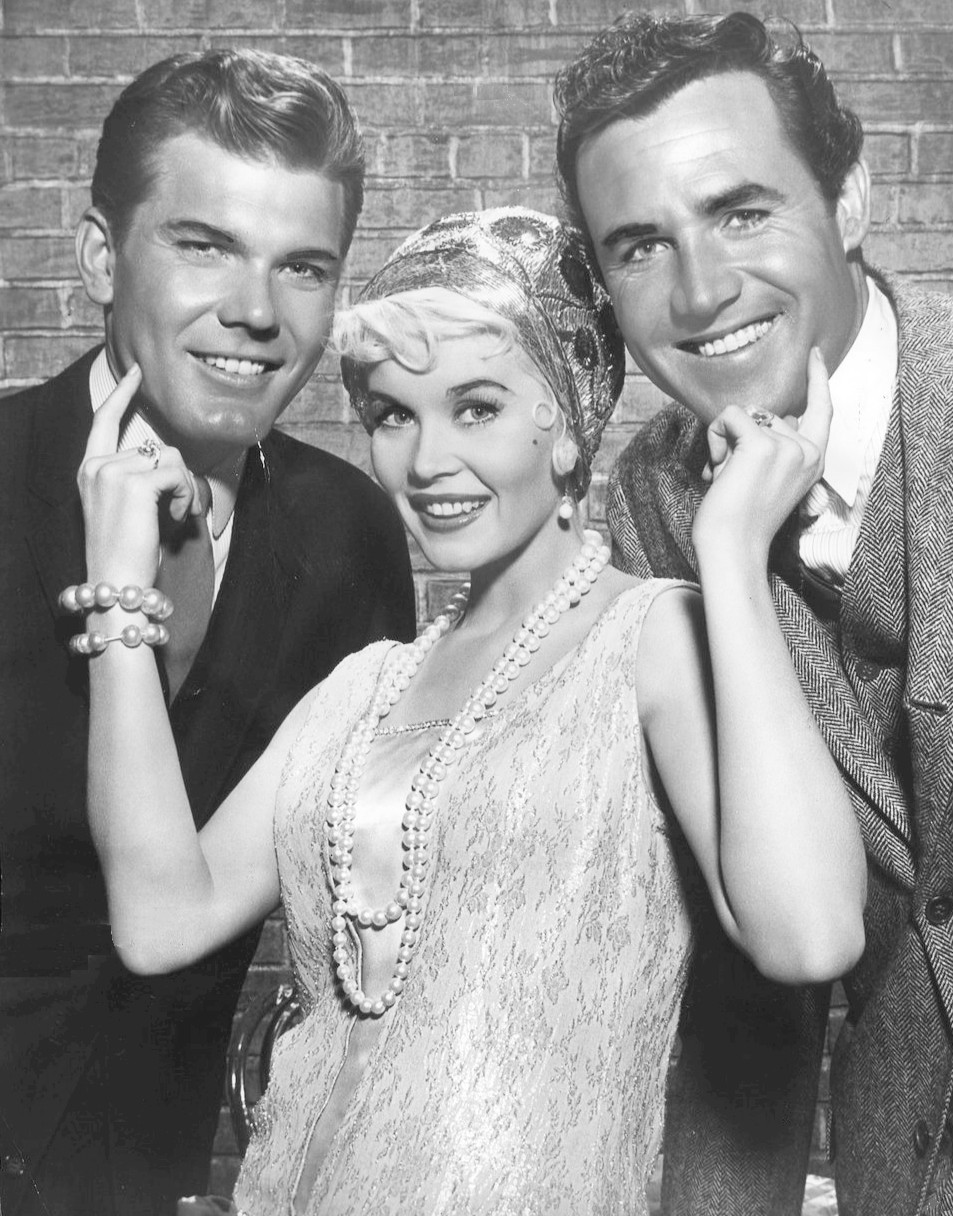
- Donald May (Pat Garrison, left), Dorothy Provine (Pinky Pinkham, center), and Rex Reason (Scott Norris, right).
- Genre: Drama
- Directed by: Robert Altman; Richard Benedict; Edward Dein; Robert Douglas; Charles F. Haas; Stuart Heisler; Marc Lawrence; Leslie H. Martinson; Irving J. Moore; Charles R. Rondeau; Sidney Salkow; Richard C. Sarafian; Robert B. Sinclair; Robert Sparr; George Waggner
- Starring: Rex Reason; Donald May; Dorothy Provine; John Dehner; Gary Vinson; Mike Road
- Theme music composer: Mack David; Jerry Livingston
- Composers: Michael Heindorf; Howard Jackson; Frank Perkins
- Country of origin: United States
- Original language: English
- No. of seasons: 2
- No. of episodes: 45

Production
- Executive producer: William T. Orr
- Producers: Jerry Davis; Boris Ingster; Tom McKnight; Gordon Bau (make-up)
- Camera setup: Single-camera
- Running time: 50 mins.
- Production company: Warner Bros. Television

Original release
- Network: ABC
- Release: October 15, 1960 – January 20, 1962

The Roaring 20s is an American drama television series starring Rex Reason, Donald May and Dorothy Provine that was broadcast by the American Broadcasting Company (ABC) from October 15, 1960, until January 20, 1962.

== Synopsis ==
Each episode of the series is an hour long. It concerns newspaper reporters reporting crime and gangsters for the fictitious newspaper The New York Record during the 1920s, such as Scott Norris (Rex Reason), Pat Garrison (Donald May), Duke Williams (John Dehner), and copy-boy Chris Higby (Gary Vinson). Mike Road played police Lieutenant Joe Switoski. Dorothy Provine features as Pinky Pinkham, the singer at the Charleston Club, in all 45 episodes. Other major actors were James Flavin as Robert Howard and Louise Glenn as Gladys, who appear in 33 and 30 episodes, respectively.

== Episodes ==
=== Season 1: 1960–61 ===
No. overall	No. in season	Title	Directed by	Written by	Original release date	Prod. code
1	1	"Burnett's Woman"	George Waggner	S : Samuel Fuller; T : Larry Welch	October 15, 1960	27783
2	2	"Champagne Lady"	Leslie H. Martinson	Unknown	October 22, 1960	25503
3	3	"The Velvet Frame"	George Waggner	László Görög	October 29, 1960	25504
4	4	"Vendetta on Bleecker Street"	Marc Lawrence	S : William Koenig; T : Samuel Roeca	November 5, 1960	27784
5	5	"The Prairie Flower"	Robert Altman	Robert J. Shaw	November 12, 1960	25513
6	6	"Brother's Keeper"	Robert Altman	Unknown	November 19, 1960	25505
7	7	"Judge Seward's Secret"	Charles F. Haas	Unknown	November 26, 1960	25506
8	8	"White Carnation"	Robert Altman	László Görög	December 3, 1960	25507
9	9	"Bold Edition"	George Waggner	T : László Görög; S/T : Richard Paul Stenger	December 10, 1960	25508
10	10	"Layoff Charley"	Robert B. Sinclair	Melvin Levy	December 17, 1960	27785
11	11	"The Maestro"	George Waggner	Melvin Levy	January 7, 1961	27786
12	12	"Dance Marathon"	Robert Altman	T : Ardel Wray; S/T : Lee Loeb	January 14, 1961	25509
13	13	"Big Town Blues"	Robert Sparr	Shirl Hendryx	January 21, 1961	25510
14	14	"Coney Red Hots"	Charles F. Haas	S : Leo Townsend; T : László Görög	January 28, 1961	27787
15	15	"Two a Day"	Robert Altman	Stuart Jerome	February 4, 1961	25511
16	16	"Black Saturday"	Edward Dein	Shirl Hendryx, Robert E. Thompson	February 11, 1961	25512
17	17	"Lucky Charm"	George Waggner	S : Joyce Fierro; S/T : Ron Bishop	February 18, 1961	25514
18	18	"Pie in the Sky"	Robert Sparr	Mary C. McCall Jr., Tedd Pierce	February 25, 1961	27788
19	19	"The Vamp"	Leslie H. Martinson	Dick Chevillat, Ray Singer	March 4, 1961	25515
20	20	"War with the Nighthawkers"	George Waggner	Robert C. Dennis	March 11, 1961	25516
21	21	"The Twelfth Hour"	Irving J. Moore	László Görög	March 18, 1961	25517
22	22	"The Salvation of Killer McFadden"	George Waggner	Unknown	April 1, 1961	25518
23	23	"The Fifth Pin"	Robert Sparr	Charles O'Neal, Victor Trivas	April 8, 1961	25519
24	24	"The Red Carpet"	Robert Douglas	S : Leonard Brown; T : Shirl Hendryx	April 15, 1961	25520
25	25	"Scandal Sheet"	Irving J. Moore	Unknown	April 22, 1961	25521
26	26	"Mademoiselle from Armentieres"	Leslie H. Martinson	Edwin Blum	April 29, 1961	25522
27	27	"Among the Missing"	Irving J. Moore	S : Talbot Jennings; T : Robert J. Shaw	May 6, 1961	27789
28	28	"Right Off the Boat: Part 1"	Robert Altman	Robert C. Dennis	May 13, 1961	25523
29	29	"Right Off the Boat: Part 2"	Robert Altman	Robert C. Dennis	May 20, 1961	25524
30	30	"Million Dollar Suit"	Leslie H. Martinson	Sheldon Stark	May 27, 1961	27790
31	31	"Royal Tour"	Robert Altman	Richard Collins	June 3, 1961	28618

=== Season 2: 1961–62 ===
No. overall	No. in season	Title	Directed by	Written by	Original release date	Prod. code
32	1	"No Exit"	Stuart Heisler	László Görög	October 7, 1961	27791
33	2	"Kitty Goes West"	Charles R. Rondeau	James O'Hanlon	October 14, 1961	27792
34	3	"Nobody's Millions"	Charles R. Rondeau	Unknown	October 21, 1961	28619
35	4	"Standing Room Only"	Robert Altman	Unknown	October 28, 1961	28620
36	5	"Another Time, Another War"	Robert Sparr	Shirl Hendryx	November 4, 1961	25562
37	6	"Everybody Loves Benny"	Stuart Heisler	Unknown	November 11, 1961	27793
38	7	"The Duke on the Bum"	Sidney Salkow	Unknown	November 18, 1961	28621
39	8	"Pinky Goes to College"	Charles R. Rondeau	Judith Plowden, Teddi Sherman	November 25, 1961	28622
40	9	"So's Your Old Man"	Sidney Salkow	Robert J. Shaw	December 2, 1961	25563
41	10	"Asparagus Tips"	Leslie H. Martinson	S : Will Gould, Richard Weil; T : Ardel Wray	December 9, 1961	28623
42	11	"Blondes Prefer Gentlemen"	Richard C. Sarafian	Stanley Niss	December 16, 1961	25564
43	12	"You Can't Fight City Hall"	Leslie H. Martinson	Ric Hardman	January 6, 1962	28624
44	13	"Footlights"	Marc Lawrence	Melvin Levy	January 13, 1962	28625
45	14	"The People People Marry"	Richard Benedict	Robert J. Shaw	January 20, 1962	25565

== Guest stars ==
- Claude Akins
- Chris Alcaide
- Mario Alcalde
- Max Baer Jr.
- Parley Baer
- Baynes Barron
- Don "Red" Barry
- Eddie Bracken
- Robert Carricart
- Jack Carter
- Jack Collins
- Ronnie Dapo
- Sam Gilman
- Clark Howat
- Shirley Knight
- Joseph Mell
- Roger Moore
- John Nolan
- Gregg Palmer
- Wynn Pearce
- Gigi Perreau
- Sherwood Price
- Jack Reitzen
- Penny Santon
- Henry Slate
- Harry Dean Stanton
- Lyle Talbot
- Jesse White
- Keenan Wynn

== Soundtrack album ==
Front cover of the 1960 Warner Bros. Records soundtrack album.

In 1960, Warner Bros. Records issued the soundtrack album The Roaring 20's to accompany the series (The full album title was: Music from The Roaring 20's Warner Bros. New Hit Television Show, Songs by Dorothy Provine and the Music of Pinky and Her Playboys). Musical direction was by Sandy Courage.

=== Track listing ===
1. "Crazy Words, Crazy Tune"; "Bye Bye Blackbird"; "Whisper Song"; "Laugh Clown Laugh"
2. "Charleston"; "Doin' the Raccoon"; "Black Bottom"
3. "I Wanna Be Loved by You"; "Someone to Watch Over Me"; "Don't Bring Lulu"
4. "Mountain Greenery"; "Sweet Georgia Brown"
5. "Poor Butterfly"; "Let's Misbehave"; "Avalon"
6. "O-oo Ernest"; "Clap Hands! Here Comes Charley!"; "Do, Do, Do"
7. "I'm Looking Over a Four Leaf Clover"; "A Cup of Coffee, a Sandwich and You"; "Tea for Two"; "The Girl Friend"
8. "It Had to Be You"; "Just a Memory"; "Barney Google"
9. "I'm Forever Blowing Bubbles"; "Limehouse Blues"
10. "Am I Blue?"; "Let's Do It"; "Nagasaki"; "The Roaring Twenties"
