= Sugarfoot =

American Western television series (1957–1961)

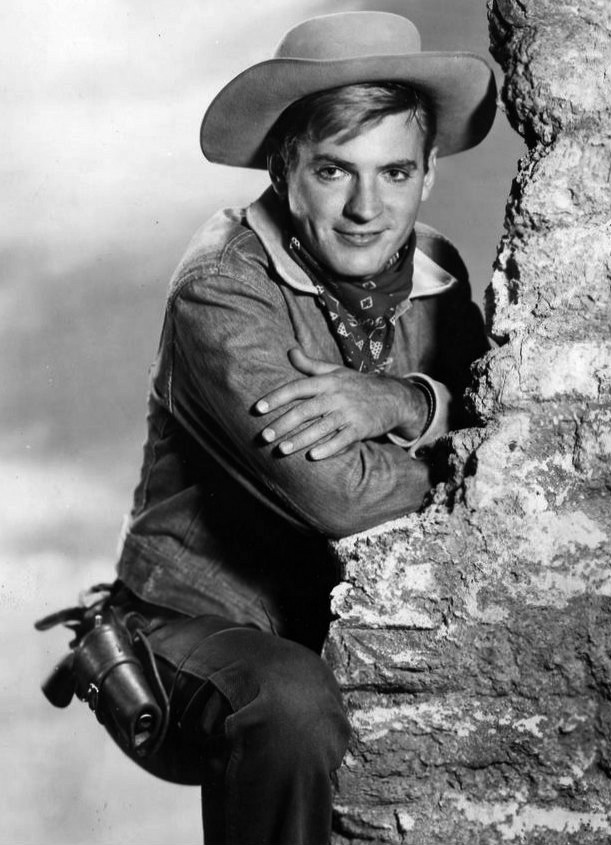
- Will Hutchins as Tom "Sugarfoot" Brewster, 1958.
- Also known as: Tenderfoot (British name)
- Genre: Western; Legal drama
- Created by: Michael Fessier
- Written by: Montgomery Pittman (four episodes)
- Directed by: Irving J. Moore; Leslie H. Martinson; Montgomery Pittman (four episodes)
- Starring: Will Hutchins
- Theme music composer: Mack David and; Jay Livingston
- Composers: Ray Heindorf; Max Steiner
- Country of origin: United States
- Original language: English
- No. of seasons: 4
- No. of episodes: 69

Production
- Executive producer: William T. Orr
- Producers: Harry Tatelman; Caroll Case; Burt Dunne; Arthur W. Silver; Oren W. Haglund (production manager); Gordon Bau (make-up)
- Production location: California
- Editors: James Moore; Carl Pingitore; Leo H. Shreve; James C. Moore; Harold Minter; Robert B. Warwick Jr.; Robert Watts
- Camera setup: Single-camera
- Running time: 50 mins.
- Production company: Warner Bros. Television

Original release
- Network: ABC
- Release: September 17, 1957 – April 17, 1961

Related
- The Boy from Oklahoma; Maverick; Cheyenne; Bronco

Sugarfoot is an American Western television series that aired for 69 episodes on ABC from 1957 to 1961 on Tuesday nights on a "shared" slot basis – rotating with Cheyenne (first season); Cheyenne and Bronco (both second and fourth seasons); and Bronco (third season). The Warner Bros. production stars Will Hutchins as Tom Brewster, an Easterner who comes to the Oklahoma Territory to become a lawyer. Brewster was a correspondence-school student whose apparent lack of cowboy skills earned him the nickname "Sugarfoot", a designation even below that of a tenderfoot. Sugarfoot was the first comedy western TV series, debuting five days before Maverick.

Hutchins was the only regular on the show. In four episodes, Hutchins also plays the dual role of Abram Thomas, "the Canary Kid", leader of an outlaw gang who is a dead ringer for Brewster. In each of these episodes, Brewster is joined in the fight against the Canary Kid's plans by Christopher Colt—i.e., Wayde Preston crossing over from his role in the simultaneously produced WB series Colt .45. Towards the end of the run, Jack Elam was cast in two of the final five episodes as Brewster's occasional sidekick Toothy Thompson, but the series was cancelled shortly thereafter.

== Background ==
Sugarfoot had no relation to the 1951 Randolph Scott Western film Sugarfoot aside from the studio owning the title (and the theme music), but its pilot episode was a remake of a 1954 Western film called The Boy from Oklahoma starring Will Rogers Jr. as Tom Brewster. The pilot episode, "Brannigan's Boots", not only recycled the plot from The Boy from Oklahoma but also featured Sheb Wooley and Slim Pickens reprising their roles from the film.

As played by Rogers in the film, Brewster carried no gun, disliked firearms in general, and vanquished villains with his roping skills (à la Will Rogers) if friendly persuasion failed. Perhaps for practical reasons, the pilot altered the character slightly and made Brewster more like the typical Western hero—reluctant to use guns (or any other kind of violence), but able and willing to do so if necessary. That remained his stance throughout the series, and the title song mentions that Sugarfoot carries a rifle and a law book.

Whenever he enters a saloon, Sugarfoot refuses liquor and orders sarsaparilla "with a dash of cherry". (Sarsaparilla is a drink similar to root beer, neither of which is alcoholic.)

Sugarfoot was one of the earliest products of the alliance between ABC and the fledgling Warner Bros. Television Department, chaired by William T. Orr. During the same period, other similar programs appeared, including Maverick, Cheyenne, Bronco, Lawman, and Colt .45. Hutchins appeared as Sugarfoot in crossover episodes of Cheyenne and Maverick, and in an installment of Bronco called "The Yankee Tornado" with Peter Breck as a young Theodore Roosevelt. Jack Kelly appeared as Bart Maverick in the Sugarfoot episode "A Price on His Head". James Garner made an appearance as Bret Maverick at the end of the episode "Misfire".

== Cast ==
=== Cast of "Brannigan's Boots" ===
- Will Hutchins as Tom "Sugarfoot" Brewster
- Merry Anders as Katie Brannigan
- Louis Jean Heydt as Paul Evans
- Dennis Hopper as Billy the Kid
- Arthur Hunnicutt as Pop Purty
- Chubby Johnson as Postmaster Wally Higgins
- Slim Pickens as Shorty
- Ainslie Pryor as Mayor Barney Turlock
- Sheb Wooley as Pete

=== Cast of The Boy from Oklahoma film (1954) ===
- Will Rogers Jr. as Sheriff Tom Brewster
- Nancy Olson as Katie Brannigan
- Lon Chaney Jr. as Crazy Charlie
- Anthony Caruso as Mayor Barney Turlock
- Wallace Ford as Postmaster Wally Higgins
- Clem Bevans as Pop Pruty, Justice of the Peace
- Merv Griffin as Steve
- Louis Jean Heydt as Paul Evans
- Sheb Wooley as Pete Martin
- Slim Pickens as Shorty
- Tyler MacDuff as Billy the Kid
- James Griffith as Joe Downey

=== Guest stars ===
- Rico Alaniz
- Chris Alcaide
- Roscoe Ates
- Rayford Barnes
- Fred Beir
- Russ Bender
- Charles Bronson
- Joe Brooks
- Ahna Capri
- Albert Carrier
- Richard Collier
- Ronnie Dapo
- Janet De Gore
- Richard Devon
- Dick Elliott
- Bill Erwin
- Dean Fredericks
- Richard Garland
- James Garner
- Sean Garrison
- Don Gordon
- Kevin Hagen
- Harry Holcombe
- Rodolfo Hoyos Jr.
- Clegg Hoyt
- Gary Hunley
- Douglas Kennedy
- Jess Kirkpatrick
- Nolan Leary
- Dayton Lummis
- Donald May
- Ken Mayer
- Rod McGaughy
- Patrick McVey
- James Millhollin
- Frank Mills
- Ewing Mitchell
- Neyle Morrow
- Gregory Morton
- Jay Novello
- Cathy O'Donnell
- Gregg Palmer
- Michael Pate
- James Philbrook
- John M. Pickard
- Slim Pickens
- Mike Ragan
- Stuart Randall
- Richard Reeves
- Rudy Sooter
- Suzanne Storrs
- Brick Sullivan
- Kent Taylor
- Kelly Thordsen
- Gary Vinson
- John Vivyan
- Gregory Walcott
- Patrick Waltz
- Efrem Zimbalist Jr.

== Episodes ==
=== Season 1: 1957–1958 ===
No. overall	No. in season	Title	Directed by	Written by	Original release date
1	1	"Brannigan's Boots"	Leslie H. Martinson	Teleplay by : Devery Freeman; Based on a screenplay by : Frank Davis & Winston Miller; Original magazine story by : Michael Fessier	September 17, 1957
2	2	"Reluctant Hero"	Leslie H. Martinson	Story by : S. Omar Barker; Teleplay by : Dean Riesner	October 1, 1957
Cade dies in the fire, and Sugarfoot is shot in the attack. Linda takes it upon herself to nurse Sugarfoot back to health. I. Stanford Jolley plays the mysterious "The Nighthawk".
3	3	"Strange Land"	Leslie H. Martinson	Story by : Louis L'Amour; Teleplay by : Russell S. Hughes	October 15, 1957
4	4	"Bunch Quitter"	Leslie H. Martinson	Story by : Dee Linford; Teleplay by : Wells Root	October 29, 1957
5	5	"Trail's End"	Leslie H. Martinson	Story by : Norman A. Fox; Teleplay by : James O'Hanlon & Michael Fessier	November 12, 1957
Sugarfoot comes upon a former childhood sweetheart, Kathy Larsen (Venetia Stevenson), who is managing a dance hall. Chris Alcaide plays the corrupt Clay Horton, who forces Kathy to marry him so that she cannot testify in court in regard to Horton's crimes. Barbara Stuart portrays Muriel, Kathy's business partner. Gordon Jones plays Sugarfoot's lively friend, Wasco Wolters, who has an interest in Muriel. This episode reveals that Tom Brewster spent his childhood in Vermont before coming to the Oklahoma Territory.
6	6	"Quicksilver"	Franklin Adreon	Story by : James Gunn; Teleplay by : Kay Lenard & Jess Carneol	November 26, 1957
Sugarfoot investigates the robbery of a silver mine which prevents the owner from meeting his payroll. The episode features Lane Bradford as the cutthroat Ellis; John Litel as Hank Tatum, the owner of the mine, and Fay Spain as Tatum's daughter, Susie, the girlfriend and eventual wife of the local sheriff. Frank Wilcox plays George Beaumont, an unscrupulous businessman who had been rejected years earlier by Hank Tatum's late wife.
7	7	"Misfire"	Franklin Adreon	Story by : Alan Le May; Teleplay by : James O'Hanlon	December 10, 1957
Brewster is a pawn in a woman's scheme to get rid of two men who are standing in the way of her potential ownership of a rich mine. James Garner makes a brief, uncredited appearance as Bret Maverick at episode's conclusion. Also featuring Connie Stevens.
8	8	"The Stallion Trail"	Edward Bernds	Story by : Crane Wilbur; Teleplay by : Dean Riesner	December 24, 1957
9	9	"Small War at Custer Junction"	Franklin Adreon	Story by : Jess Carneol & Kay Lenard; Teleplay by : James O'Hanlon and Jess Carneol & Kay Lenard	January 7, 1958
10	10	"Bullet Proof"	Franklin Adreon	Fredric M. Frank	January 21, 1958
Sugarfoot tricks a gang into believing that he knows the location of the loot from their last bank robbery. Gregory Walcott plays Peaches' presumed fiance, Duke McKlintock, and Don "Red" Barry is cast as Tanner. Joi Lansing guest stars as the unsavory but attractive "Peaches", who claims to be a belle from Georgia.
11	11	"Deadlock"	Franklin Adreon	James O'Hanlon	February 4, 1958
12	12	"Man Wanted"	Franklin Adreon	Sig Herzig	February 18, 1958
13	13	"The Dead Hills"	Franklin Adreon	Story by : Louis L'Amour; Teleplay by : Earl Baldwin; Adaptation : Paul Gangelin	March 4, 1958
14	14	"A Wreath for Charity Lloyd"	Franklin Adreon	Jackson Gillis	March 18, 1958
15	15	"Hideout"	Montgomery Pittman	Story by : Maurita Pittman; Teleplay by : Russell S. Hughes	April 1, 1958
16	16	"Guns for Big Bear"	Franklin Adreon	Story by : Elliot West; Teleplay by : Sig Herzig	April 15, 1958
17	17	"Price on His Head"	Richard L. Bare	Story by : Pamela Herbert & Leo Guild; Teleplay by : Henry Kuttner & C.L. Moore	April 29, 1958
Tom is on a stagecoach that's robbed, and the driver is killed. But when the thieves don't find what they're looking for on board, they hold the other four passengers hostage and send Tom into town to get the money they are sure has been taken from the coach. With an appearance by Jack Kelly as Bart Maverick.
18	18	"Short Range"	Montgomery Pittman	Story by : James Barnett & Steve Goodman; Teleplay by : Montgomery Pittman	May 13, 1958
19	19	"The Bullet and the Cross"	Lee Sholem	Peter R. Brooke	May 27, 1958
20	20	"Mule Team"	Franklin Adreon	Story by : Kenneth Perkins; Teleplay by : Sig Herzig	June 10, 1958

=== Season 2: 1958–1959 ===
No. overall	No. in season	Title	Directed by	Written by	Original release date
21	1	"Ring of Sand"	Leslie H. Martinson	Raphael Hayes	September 16, 1958
22	2	"Brink of Fear"	Leslie H. Martinson	Harold Medford	September 30, 1958
23	3	"The Wizard"	Joseph Lejtes	C.L. Moore	October 14, 1958
24	4	"The Ghost"	Lee Sholem	C.L. Moore (as Catherine Kuttner)	October 28, 1958
25	5	"The Canary Kid"	Montgomery Pittman	Montgomery Pittman	November 11, 1958
26	6	"The Hunted"	Joseph Lejtes	Peter R. Brooke; Based on a story from : True West Magazine	November 25, 1958
27	7	"Yampa Crossing"	Joseph Lejtes	Thomas W. Blackburn	December 9, 1958
28	8	"Devil to Pay"	Lee Sholem	Fredric M. Frank	December 23, 1958
29	9	"The Desperadoes"	Joseph Lejtes	Raphael Hayes	January 6, 1959
30	10	"The Extra Hand"	Lee Sholem	Peter R. Brooke	January 20, 1959
31	11	"The Return of the Canary Kid"	Montgomery Pittman	Montgomery Pittman	February 3, 1959
32	12	"The Mysterious Stranger"	Paul Henreid	Story by : Jack Emanuel; Teleplay by : Raphael Hayes	February 17, 1959
Features Adam West (Batman) as Frederick Pulaski
33	13	"The Giant Killer"	Joseph Lejtes	Norman Daniels & Harold Medford	March 3, 1959
34	14	"The Royal Raiders"	Leslie H. Martinson	Peter R. Brooke	March 17, 1959
35	15	"The Mountain"	Joseph Lejtes	C.L. Moore (as Catherine Kuttner)	March 31, 1959
36	16	"The Twister"	Joseph Lejtes	James Gunn & Ellis St. Joseph	April 14, 1959
37	17	"The Vultures"	Joseph Lejtes	Peter R. Brooke & James Gunn	April 28, 1959
38	18	"The Avengers"	Joseph Lejtes	Story by : Jack Emanuel & Montgomery Pittman; Teleplay by : Lowell Barrington	May 12, 1959
39	19	"Small Hostage"	Anton Leader	Polly James	May 26, 1959
40	20	"Wolf"	Joseph Lejtes	Story by : Robert Moore Williams; Teleplay by : Milton S. Gelman	June 9, 1959

=== Season 3: 1959–1960 ===
No. overall	No. in season	Title	Directed by	Written by	Original release date
41	1	"The Trial of the Canary Kid"	Montgomery Pittman	Story by : Montgomery Pittman; Teleplay by : C.L. Moore (as Catherine Kuttner)	September 15, 1959
Though self-contained as a story, this is a sequel to the June 1959 episode of Lawman entitled "The Wayfarer". The Canary Kid is revealed to have been a witness to the events of that episode, and is expected to testify in a trial. Peter Brown appears as his Lawman character Johnny McKay.
42	2	"The Wild Bunch"	Leslie Goodwins	Dean Riesner	September 29, 1959
43	3	"MacBrewster the Bold"	Leslie Goodwins	Dean Riesner	October 13, 1959
44	4	"The Gitanos"	Leslie Goodwins	Edmund Morris	October 27, 1959
45	5	"The Canary Kid, Inc."	Leslie Goodwins	Samuel Roeca	November 10, 1959
46	6	"Outlaw Island"	Reginald LeBorg	Lowell Barrington	November 24, 1959
47	7	"Apollo with a Gun"	Robert Altman	Warren Douglas	December 8, 1959
48	8	"The Gaucho"	Paul Guilfoyle	Edmund Morris	December 22, 1959
49	9	"Journey to Provision"	James V. Kern	Edmund Morris	January 5, 1960
50	10	"The Highbinder"	Robert Altman	Warren Douglas	January 19, 1960
51	11	"Wolfpack"	Leslie Goodwins	Story by : Dick Nelson; Teleplay by : William L. Stuart	February 2, 1960
52	12	"Fernando"	H. Bruce Humberstone	Dean Riesner	February 16, 1960
53	13	"Blackwater Swamp"	Leslie Goodwins	Story by : Jim Barnett; Teleplay by : Warren Douglas	March 1, 1960
54	14	"Return to Boot Hill"	Lee Sholem	Warren Douglas	March 15, 1960
55	15	"Vinegarroon"	William J. Hole, Jr.	Warren Douglas	March 29, 1960
56	16	"The Corsican"	William J. Hole, Jr.	Ric Hardman	April 12, 1960
57	17	"Blue Bonnet Stray"	Leslie Goodwins	Warren Douglas	April 26, 1960
58	18	"The Long Dry"	Lew Landers	Story by : Jim Barnett (as Iain MacCormick); Teleplay by : Buckley Angell	May 10, 1960
59	19	"Funeral at Forty Mile"	Leslie Goodwins	Story by : Hugh Benson and Dick Nelson; Teleplay by : Dick Nelson	May 24, 1960
60	20	"The Captive Locomotive"	Leslie Goodwins	Irwin Winehouse & A. Sanford Wolfe	June 7, 1960

=== Season 4: 1960–1961 ===
No. overall	No. in season	Title	Directed by	Written by	Original release date
61	1	"Shadow Catcher"	Leslie Goodwins	Warren Douglas	September 26, 1960
62	2	"A Noose for Nora"	Lee Sholem	Lester Fuller & Lee Loeb	October 24, 1960
63	3	"Man from Medora"	Leslie Goodwins	Warren Douglas	November 21, 1960
64	4	"Welcome Enemy"	Leslie Goodwins	"W. Hermanos" (Note: W. Hermanos does not exist. In 1960, during a strike by the Writers Guild of America, Warner Brothers took previously-produced scripts written for various Warner Brothers television properties, and had producers of their current shows shoot these old scripts as "new episodes" simply by changing the script's character names and making a few other minimal cosmetic alterations to suit the current show. These repurposed scripts were credited to "W. Hermanos", Hermanos being Spanish for Brothers.)	December 26, 1960
65	5	"Toothy Thompson"	Lee Sholem	Howard Browne & Warren Douglas	January 16, 1961
66	6	"Shepherd with a Gun"	Lew Landers	Warren Douglas	February 6, 1961
67	7	"Angel"	Lee Sholem	Warren Douglas	March 6, 1961
68	8	"Stranger in Town"	Lew Landers	Lester Fuller	March 27, 1961
69	9	"Trouble at Sand Springs"	Herbert L. Strock	Leo Gordon	April 17, 1961

== Background and production ==
After several episodes aired in the second season, a disappointed Hutchins complained in a letter to executive director William T. Orr that the scripts were written so that the lead character Sugarfoot was not particularly needed in many of the episodes.

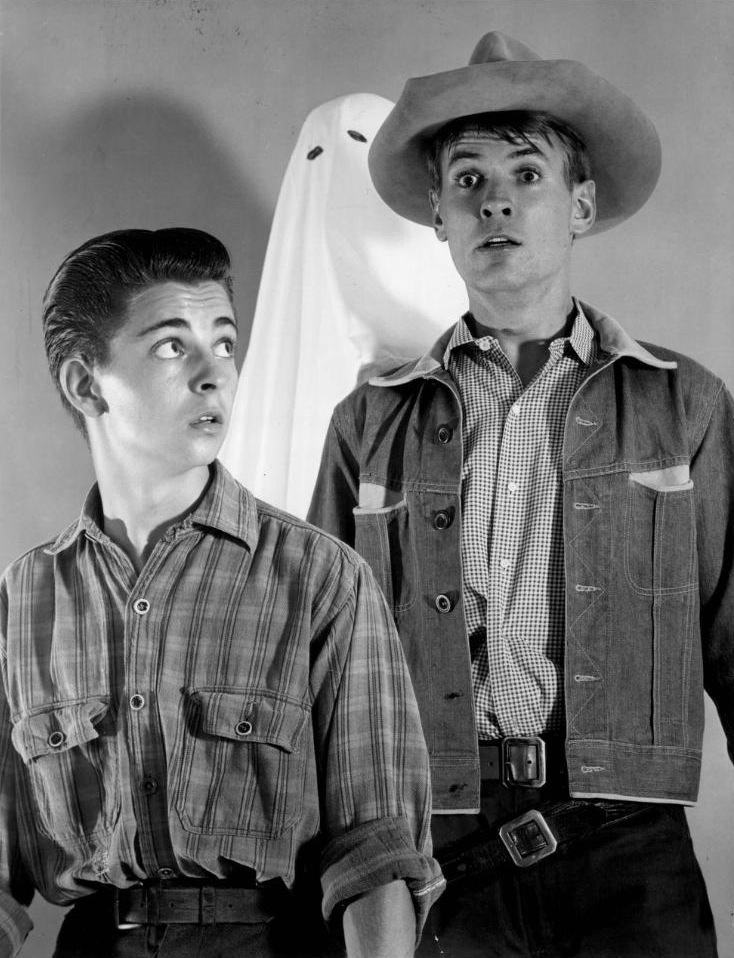
Tommy Rettig with Will Hutchins in Sugarfoot (1958).

Wayde Preston, who played Christopher Colt on the ABC Western Colt .45, appeared four times in that same role on Sugarfoot in the episodes dealing with "The Canary Kid," a role also played by Will Hutchins.

== Reception ==
Sugarfoot finished at #24 in the Nielsen ratings for the 1957–1958 season and #21 for 1958–1959.

== Release ==
=== Home media ===
Warner Bros. has released all four seasons on MOD (manufacture on demand) DVD-R's in Region 1 via their Warner Archive Collection.

== In popular culture ==
- In an episode of Arrested Development titled "Spring Breakout", Sugarfoot is mentioned and the theme song is presented.
- The series debuted in 1958 in the United Kingdom but only in the Midlands area. In 1960, it was aired nationally in the UK by the BBC, at which point it was renamed Tenderfoot despite the fact that it kept the theme song which refers to the character as "Sugarfoot". After 1964, the series returned to ITV, this time not just restricted to the Midlands, where it was once again billed under its original name.
