= Colt .45 (TV series) =

American Western television series (1957–1960)

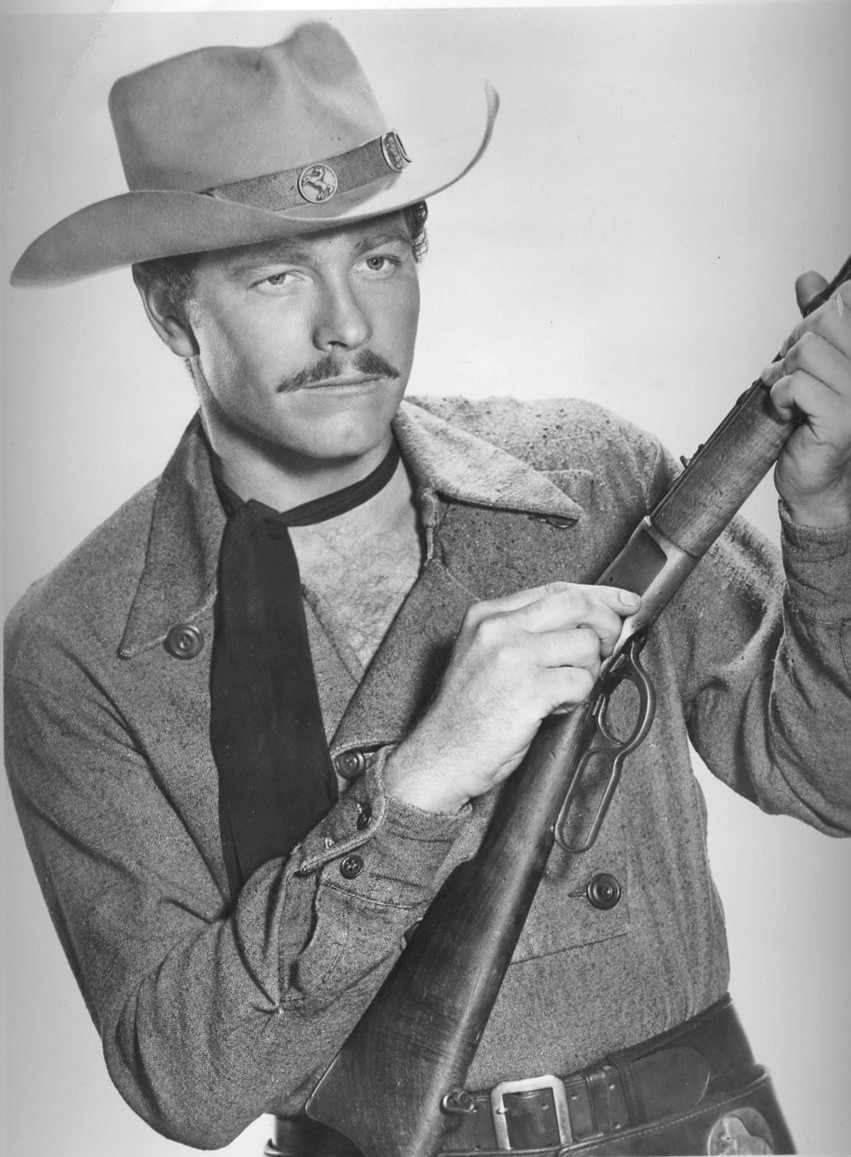
- Wayde Preston as Christopher Colt, 1959
- Also known as: The Colt Cousins
- Genre: Western
- Created by: Based on the film by; Thomas W. Blackburn
- Developed by: Roy Huggins
- Starring: Wayde Preston; Donald May; Kenneth MacDonald
- Theme music composer: Mack David; Jerry Livingston
- Opening theme: Performed by Hal Hopper
- Composers: Paul Sawtell; Bert Shefter
- Country of origin: United States
- Original language: English
- No. of seasons: 3
- No. of episodes: 67

Production
- Executive producer: William T. Orr
- Producers: Roy Huggins; Harry Tatelman; Cedric Francis; Mack David; Joseph Hoffman; Oren W. Haglund (production manager); Gordon Bau (make-up)
- Editor: James Moore
- Running time: 23-25 minutes
- Production company: Warner Bros. Television

Original release
- Network: ABC
- Release: October 18, 1957 – June 21, 1960

Related
- Colt .45; Maverick; Shotgun Slade; Sugarfoot

Colt .45 (also known as The Colt Cousins) is an American Western television series, originally starring Wayde Preston, which aired on ABC between October 1957 and June 1960, with reruns airing until September 1960.

The half-hour program is loosely based on the 1950 Warner Bros. film of the same name, starring Randolph Scott. Colt .45 was part of an array of Westerns that William T. Orr produced for Warner Bros. and ABC in the late 1950s and early 1960s.

== Overview ==
Roy Huggins developed the series with Wayde Preston in the part of undercover government agent Christopher Colt, who takes the cover of a traveling Old West pistol salesman, hence the title of the series. Colt .45 also featured fictionalizations of actual historical characters, including Edwin Booth (brother of John Wilkes Booth, the assassin of U.S. President Abraham Lincoln), Sam Bass, Billy the Kid, Lew Wallace, Judge Roy Bean, Buffalo Bill Cody, Ned Buntline, and Calamity Jane.

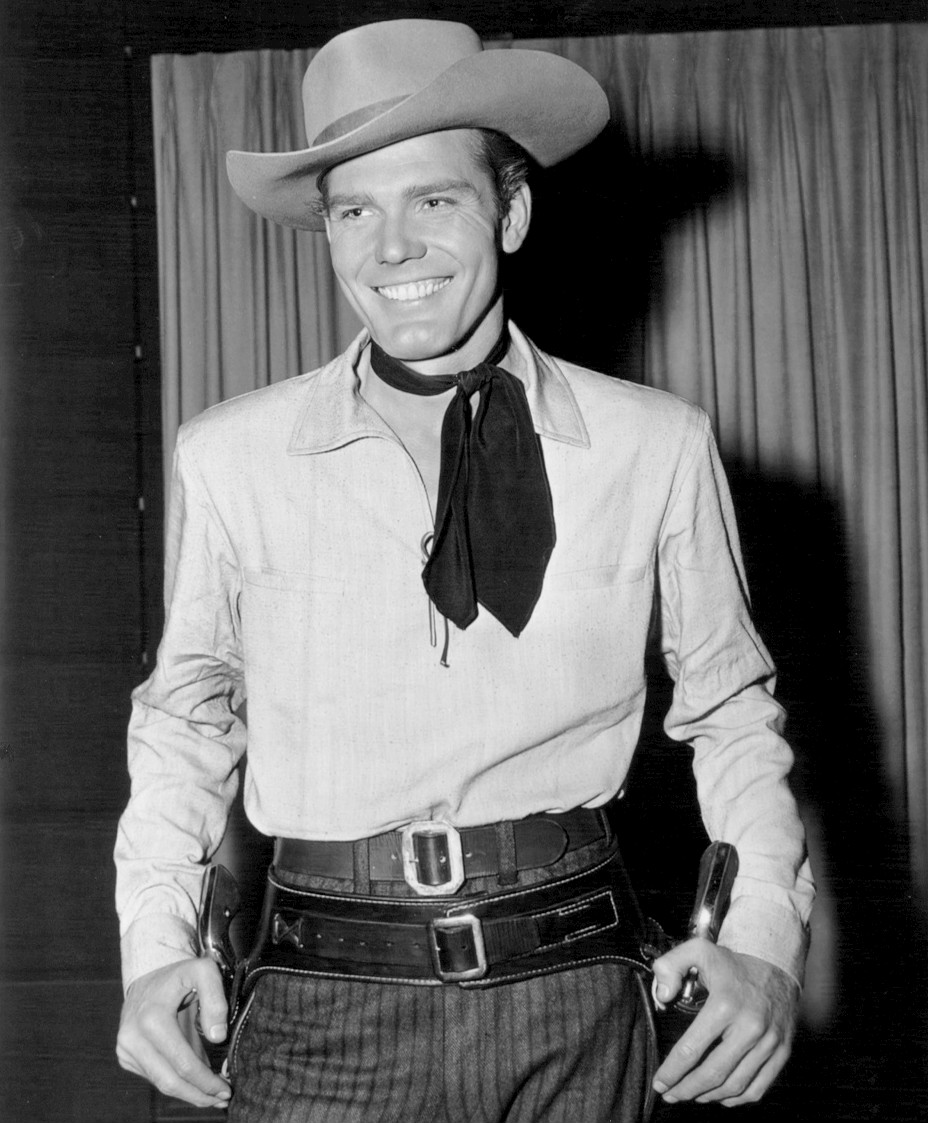
Donald May as Sam Colt Jr., in 1959

During this period, Colt .45 was one of several ABC/WB Western productions, along with Cheyenne, Sugarfoot, Lawman, Maverick, and Bronco. Various series leads occasionally did crossover episodes on some of the other WB programs. One of the most imaginative was the "Hadley's Hunters" episode of Maverick, in which Bart Maverick (Jack Kelly) comes upon Christopher Colt's sales satchel, abandoned in a room and covered with dust, as the series had been cancelled the previous season.

In 1958, series star Wayde Preston left the series because he claimed he was made to do stunts that required a stunt man. Preston was also reportedly unhappy with the show's low budget, which caused other problems. Because of Preston's departure, producers were forced to air repeats of the series along with a few new episodes to complete the 1958–1959 season.

In 1959, Donald May assumed the lead role as Sam Colt Jr., the cousin of Christopher Colt. After leaving the series, Warner Bros. prevented Preston from obtaining other acting jobs. He eventually returned briefly to the series, but was demoted to a co-starring role with May. Due to the casting changes, the series was eventually marketed in the United Kingdom as The Colt Cousins.

== Guest stars ==
- Chris Alcaide
- Fred Aldrich
- Robert Anderson
- Rayford Barnes
- Russ Bender
- Dan Blocker
- Nesdon Booth
- Lane Bradford
- Chet Brandenburg
- Charles Bronson
- Joe Brooks
- Peter Brown
- Stephen Chase
- Don Chastain
- John Cliff
- Fred Coby
- Richard Collier
- Robert Conrad
- Kathleen Crowley
- Richard H. Cutting
- Alan Dexter
- Angie Dickinson
- Kem Dibbs
- Troy Donahue
- John Doucette
- Richard Garland
- Sean Garrison
- Bing Russell
- Jock Gaynor
- Robert Griffin
- Alan Hale Jr.
- Tom Hennesy
- Robert 'Buzz' Henry
- Chuck Hicks
- Michael Hinn
- Bern Hoffman
- Rodolfo Hoyos Jr.
- I. Stanford Jolley
- Stacy Keach Sr.
- Sandy Koufax
- Norman Leavitt
- Britt Lomond
- Jimmy Lydon
- Herbert Lytton
- Lee Van Cleef
- Walter Maslow
- Rod McGaughy
- Leonard Nimoy
- James Nolan
- Mike Ragan
- Gilman Rankin
- Alfred Shelly
- George Sowards
- Lyle Talbot
- Guy Teague
- Kelly Thordsen
- John Vivyan
- Max Wagner
- Adam West
- Margaret Whiting

== Series overview ==
Season	Episodes	Originally released	
Season	Episodes	First released	Last released
1	26	October 18, 1957	April 11, 1958
2	13	April 5, 1959	June 28, 1959
3	28	October 4, 1959	June 21, 1960

== Episodes ==
=== Season 1: 1957–1958 ===
No. overall	No. in season	Title	Directed by	Written by	Original release date
1	1	"Judgment Day" "The Peacemaker"	Douglas Heyes	S : Roy Huggins; T : Marion Hargrove	October 18, 1957
2	2	"A Time to Die"	Douglas Heyes	Leo Gordon	October 25, 1957
3	3	"The Three Thousand Dollar Bullet"	Franklin Adreon	Eric Freiwald, Robert Schaefer	November 1, 1957
4	4	"Gallows at Granite Gap"	Franklin Adreon	S : Joseph Chadwick; T : William F. Leicester	November 8, 1957
5	5	"Small Man"	Edward Bernds	Frederick Brady	November 15, 1957
6	6	"Final Payment"	Franklin Adreon	Wells Root	November 22, 1957
7	7	"One Good Turn"	Edward Bernds	John McGreevey	November 29, 1957
8	8	"Last Chance"	Edward Bernds	S : Harold Shumate; T : Gil Doud	December 6, 1957
9	9	"Young Gun"	Walter Grauman	T : Daniel B. Ullman; S/T : William Driskill, Joel Rapp	December 13, 1957
10	10	"Rebellion"	Walter Grauman	S : Anthony Coldeway; T : James Gunn	December 20, 1957
11	11	"The Gypsies"	Alan Crosland Jr.	S : Wesley Haynes; T : Frederick Brady	December 27, 1957
12	12	"Sign in the Sand"	Alan Crosland Jr.	Frederick Brady	January 3, 1958
13	13	"The Mirage"	Montgomery Pittman	Montgomery Pittman	January 10, 1958
14	14	"Blood Money"	Abner Biberman	David Lang	January 17, 1958
15	15	"Dead Reckoning"	Abner Biberman	Jack Harvey	January 24, 1958
16	16	"Decoy"	Leslie H. Martinson	S : Albert Aley, William MacLeod Raine; T : James Edmiston	January 31, 1958
17	17	"Rare Specimen"	Leslie H. Martinson	Gene Levitt, Eugene Manlove Rhodes	February 7, 1958
18	18	"Mantrap"	Unknown	Montgomery Pittman	February 14, 1958
19	19	"Ghost Town"	Lee Sholem	S : Nelson Nye; T : James Gunn	February 21, 1958
20	20	"The Golden Gun"	Richard L. Bare	Frederick Brady	February 28, 1958
21	21	"Circle of Fear"	Leslie H. Martinson	S : Ben Markson; T : Howard Browne	March 7, 1958
22	22	"Split Second"	Leslie H. Martinson	S : Orville H. Hampton; T : William F. Leicester	March 14, 1958
23	23	"Point of Honor" "Woman on the Stagecoach"	William J. Hole Jr.	Steve Fisher	March 21, 1958
24	24	"The Deserters"	Leslie H. Martinson	S : Norman Daniels; T : Tony Barrett, Frederick Brady	March 28, 1958
25	25	"The Manbuster"	Oliver Drake	S : Richard Wormser; T : Oliver Drake	April 4, 1958
26	26	"Long Odds"	Franklin Adreon	S : Joseph Hoffman; T : David Lang	April 11, 1958

=== Season 2: 1959 ===
No. overall	No. in season	Title	Directed by	Written by	Original release date
27	1	"The Escape"	Lee Sholem	T : Irwin Winehouse, A. Sanford Wolfe	April 5, 1959
28	2	"Dead Aim"	Lee Sholem	S : Sid Harris; T : Wells Root	April 12, 1959
29	3	"The Magic Box"	George Waggner	Irwin Winehouse, A. Sanford Wolfe	April 19, 1959
30	4	"The Confession"	Harold Daniels	Dwight V. Babcock	April 26, 1959
31	5	"The Man Who Loved Lincoln"	Arthur Ripley	S : James Barnett, Jack Emanuel; T : Leonard Lee	May 3, 1959
32	6	"The Sanctuary"	Jodie Copelan	S : Jack Emanuel; T : Frank Gruber, Dean Riesner	May 10, 1959
33	7	"The Saga of Sam Bass"	William J. Hole Jr.	T : Irwin Winehouse, A. Sanford Wolfe	May 17, 1959
34	8	"Amnesty"	William J. Hole Jr.	S : James Barnett, Jack Emanuel; T : Irwin Winehouse, A. Sanford Wolfe	May 24, 1959
35	9	"The Pirate"	Montgomery Pittman	S : Day Keene; T : Finlay McDermid	May 31, 1959
36	10	"Law West of the Pecos"	Alan Crosland Jr.	John Tucker Battle	June 7, 1959
37	11	"Don't Tell Joe"	Unknown	S : Peter Dixon; T : Maurice Zimm	June 14, 1959
38	12	"Return to El Paso"	Lee Sholem	T : Irwin Winehouse, A. Sanford Wolfe	June 21, 1959
39	13	"Night of Decision"	Leslie H. Martinson	Irwin Winehouse, A. Sanford Wolfe	June 28, 1959

=== Season 3: 1959–1960 ===
No. overall	No. in season	Title	Directed by	Written by	Original release date
40	1	"Queen of Dixie"	Herbert L. Strock	Irwin Winehouse, A. Sanford Wolfe	October 4, 1959
41	2	"The Reckoning"	Unknown	Carl Onspaugh	October 11, 1959
42	3	"The Devil's Godson"	Herbert L. Strock	S : James Barnett, Jack Emanuel; T : Malcolm Stuart Boylan	October 18, 1959
43	4	"The Rival Gun"	Unknown	S : Mack David; T : Malcolm Stuart Boylan	October 25, 1959
44	5	"The Hothead"	Paul Guilfoyle	S : Mack David; T : Milton Raison, Dean Riesner	November 1, 1959
45	6	"A Legend of Buffalo Bill"	Emory Horger	S : James Barnett, Jack Emanuel; T : William Driskill	November 8, 1959
46	7	"Yellow Terror"	Herbert L. Strock	Irwin Winehouse, A. Sanford Wolfe	November 15, 1959
47	8	"Tar and Feathers"	Emory Horger	Irwin Winehouse, A. Sanford Wolfe	November 22, 1959
48	9	"Alias Mr. Howard"	Herbert L. Strock	T : A. Sanford Wolfe	December 6, 1959
49	10	"Calamity"	Paul Guilfoyle	Dwight Newton	December 13, 1959
50	11	"Under False Pretenses"	Roy Del Ruth	S : Elmer Kelton; T : Dwight Newton	January 10, 1960
51	12	"Impasse"	Paul Landres	Lee Loeb, Rudy Makoul	January 31, 1960
52	13	"Arizona Anderson"	George Waggner	Mack David, Lee Loeb	February 14, 1960
53	14	"The Cause"	H. Bruce Humberstone	Irwin Winehouse, A. Sanford Wolfe	February 28, 1960
54	15	"Phantom Trail"	Lew Landers	S : James Barnett, Mack David; T : Nat Tanchuck	March 13, 1960
55	16	"Breakthrough"	Unknown	Kenneth Gamet	March 27, 1960
56	17	"Chain of Command"	Lew Landers	S : Roy Huggins; T : Howard Browne, Dean Riesner	April 5, 1960
57	18	"Alibi"	Lew Landers	S : Edmund Morris; T : W. Hermanos	April 12, 1960
58	19	"Absent Without Leave"	Unknown	S : Hugh Benson; T : William F. Leicester	April 19, 1960
59	20	"Strange Encounter"	Herbert L. Strock	S : Irving Rubine; T : W. Hermanos, William F. Leicester	April 26, 1960
60	21	"Trial by Rope"	Herbert L. Strock	W. Hermanos, William F. Leicester	May 3, 1960
61	22	"The Gandy Dancers"	Unknown	T : David Lang, Edmund Morris	May 10, 1960
62	23	"Martial Law"	William J. Hole Jr.	T : W. Hermanos, Clair Huffaker	May 17, 1960
63	24	"Attack"	William J. Hole Jr.	T : W. Hermanos, Dean Riesner	May 24, 1960
64	25	"Bounty List"	Lee Sholem	T : W. Hermanos, Finlay McDermid	May 31, 1960
65	26	"Appointment in Agoura"	Lee Sholem	T : W. Hermanos, Edmund Morris; S/T : William F. Leicester	June 7, 1960
66	27	"Showdown at Goldtown"	Lee Sholem	S : Kenneth Perkins; T : W. Hermanos, William F. Leicester	June 14, 1960
67	28	"The Trespasser"	Lee Sholem	T : Clair Huffaker	June 21, 1960

== Reception and cancellation ==
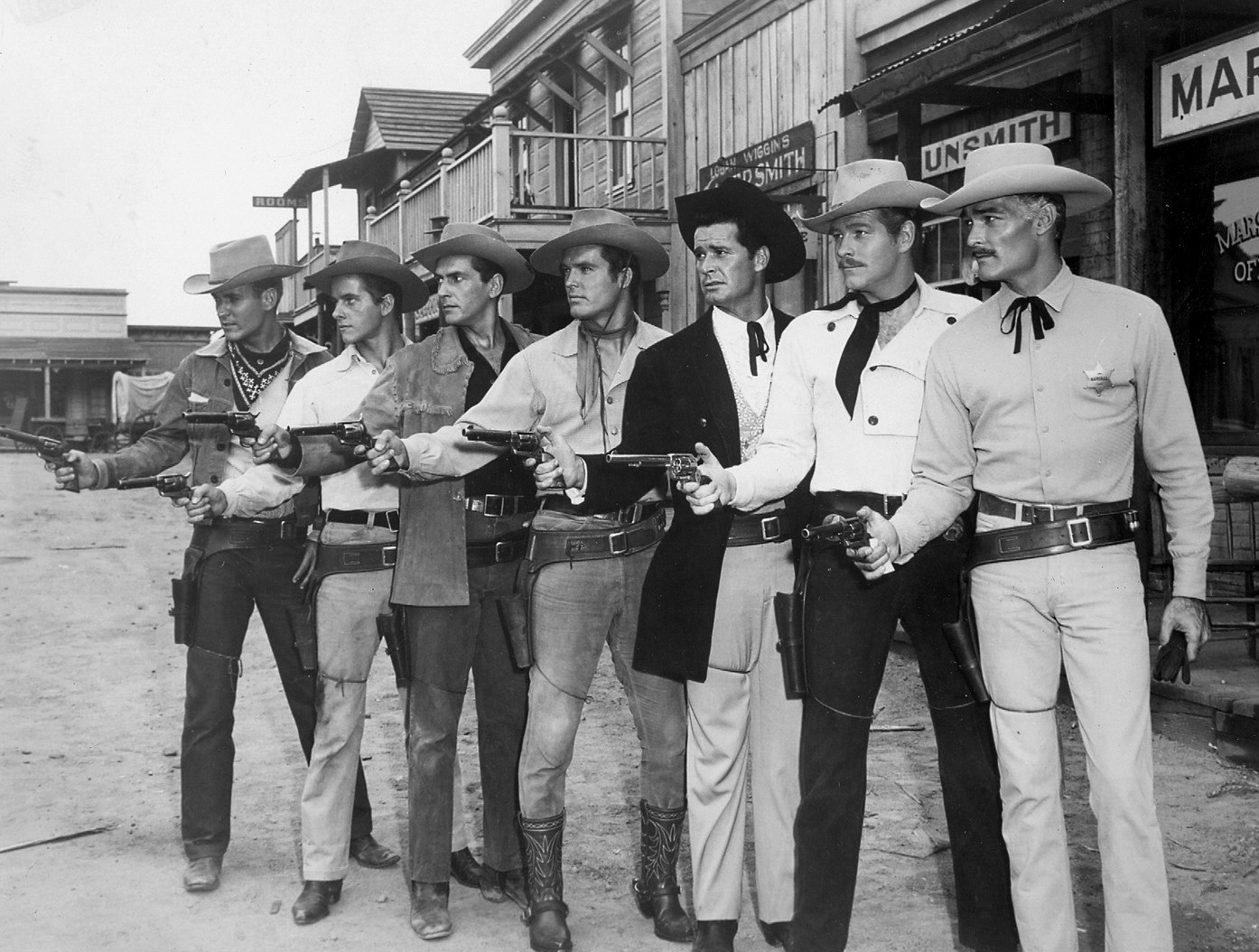
Publicity still with 1959 Warner Bros. series leads Will Hutchins (Sugarfoot), Peter Brown (Lawman), Jack Kelly (Maverick), Ty Hardin (Bronco), James Garner (Maverick), Wayde Preston (Colt .45), and John Russell (Lawman).

Upon its debut in October 1957, Colt .45 was a respectable ratings draw for ABC. It helped ABC win its timeslot against NBC and CBS.

By season two, however, behind the scenes problems caused a dip in viewership. After series star Wayde Preston left the series due to his dissatisfaction with working conditions, producers were forced to repeat episodes to fill out the second season. There were also problems with the show's sponsorship which changed repeatedly. According to author Alvin H. Marill, the choice to cast Donald May in the lead role after Preston's departure was not explained in the storyline. Wayde Preston eventually returned to the series but by then, ratings had dropped off and ABC canceled the series in 1960. The final episode aired on 27 September 1960.

== Production notes ==
=== Theme song ===
The Colt .45 opening theme music was composed by Hal Hopper with lyrics by Douglas Heyes.

=== Merchandising ===
The TV show was adapted into a comic strip by Dan Spiegle, distributed by Dell Comics.

== Release notes ==
In January 2024, the Warner Archive announced that the complete series would be released in a Blu-ray set. It was released on March 12, 2024.
