= Ronnie Dapo =

American actor (born 1952)

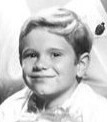
- Publicity photo for the premiere of the television program Room for One More (1962)
- Born: May 8, 1952; Plattsburgh, New York, U.S.
- Died: November 12, 2025 (aged 73); Denver, Colorado, U.S.
- Occupations: Film and television actor
- Years active: 1959–1966

Ronnie Dapo (May 8, 1952 – November 12, 2025) was an American film and television actor. He is known for playing Flip Rose in the American sitcom television series Room for One More.

== Life and career ==
Dapo was born in Plattsburgh, New York, the son of George and Sadie Dapo. At the age of five, he and his family moved to Pontiac, Michigan, then to California. Dapo met his agent, Lola Moore, while travelling on a bus. After Dapo's mother showed her pictures of her children, she asked if "he would like to audition". After his first audition he was cast in Jack Webb's 1959 film -30-. After freelancing for various studios he was signed to a contract with Warner Bros.. he guest-starred on television programs including The Fugitive, Wagon Train, The Munsters, Cheyenne, The Sheriff of Cochise and The Lucy Show. He also appeared in the 1960 film Ocean's 11, and the 1962 film The Music Man.

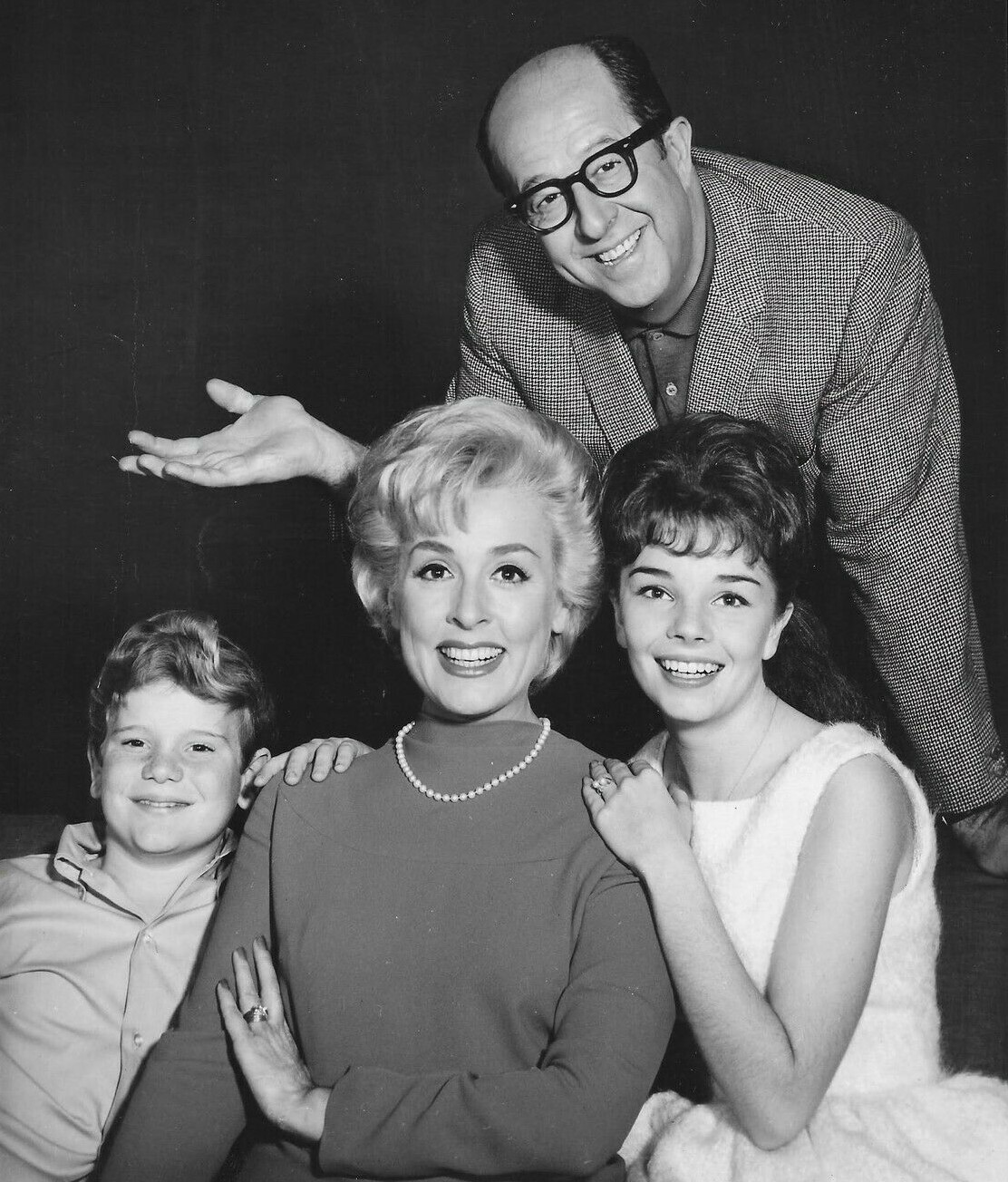
Dapo (left) with Elena Verdugo, Phil Silvers and Sandy Descher in The New Phil Silvers Show, 1964

In 1962, Dapo starred as Flip Rose in the ABC television series Room for One More, starring along with Andrew Duggan, Peggy McCay, Carol Nicholson, Ahna Capri, Tim Rooney, Jack Albertson and Maxine Stuart. He also played the recurring role of Arnold Winkler in three episodes of the CBS sitcom television series The Andy Griffith Show. In 1964, he starred as Andy in the CBS situation comedy television series The New Phil Silvers Show, starring along with Phil Silvers, Elena Verdugo and Sandy Descher.

Dapo retired from acting at the age of fourteen, later working as a touring musician. He ran a printing press and worked in steel framing, retiring at the age of sixty. He resided with his wife in Denver, Colorado.

== Death ==
Dapo died in Denver, Colorado on November 12, 2025, at the age of 73.
