= Room for One More =

Room for One More refers to:

- "Room for One More", a song by Anthrax from its studio album Sound of White Noise (1993)
- Room for One More (film), a 1952 American comedy-drama film
- Room for One More (TV series), a 1962 American situation-comedy television series
