= Leslie H. Martinson =

American film director

- Born: Leslie Herbert Martinson; January 16, 1915; Boston, Massachusetts, U.S.
- Died: September 3, 2016 (aged 101); Los Angeles, California, U.S.
- Other names: Leslie Martinson; Les Martinson
- Occupation: Director
- Spouse: Connie Martinson
- Website: www.lesliemartinson.com

Leslie Herbert Martinson (January 16, 1915 – September 3, 2016) was an American television and film director.

== Career ==
Martinson was born to Gertrude and Lewis Martinson in Boston, Massachusetts, on January 16, 1915. He had a brother named Bertram. He was a newspaper journalist before accepting a long-term job as an MGM script clerk in 1936. He began directing TV western series in the early 1950s. His first feature film assignment was Republic Pictures' 1954 film The Atomic Kid, a Mickey Rooney matinée vehicle. Beginning with episodes of the series Conflict, Martinson became a prolific director for Warner Brothers Television.

In 1954 and 1955, he directed the first of Mickey Rooney's three failed situation comedy television series entitled The Mickey Rooney Show: Hey, Mulligan. Throughout the 1960s and 1970s, Martinson continued directing feature films and episodic television including Maverick, PT 109, Temple Houston, Batman, Mission: Impossible, Mannix, Diff'rent Strokes, and the made-for-TV movie, Rescue from Gilligan's Island. During the 1980s, Martinson directed episodes of Harper Valley PTA, CHiPs, and Airwolf.

Martinson was President Emeritus of the West Coast Jewish Theatre.

== Personal life ==
He was married to television host and writer Connie Martinson. They resided in Beverly Hills, California. He turned 100 on January 16, 2015 and died on September 3, 2016, at the age of 101. Prior to his marriage to Connie, Leslie was married to Louise Fish.

== Filmography ==
=== Director ===
- City Detective (Unknown episodes, 1953)
- Cowboy G-Men (1 episode, 1953)
- General Electric Theater (Unknown episodes, 1953)
- The Pepsi-Cola Playhouse (Unknown episodes, 1953)
- Topper (Unknown episodes, 1953)
- The Roy Rogers Show (11 episodes, 1953–1954)
- The Mickey Rooney Show: Hey, Mulligan (1 episode, 1954)
- The Atomic Kid (1954)
- TV Reader's Digest (Unknown episodes, 1955)
- The Millionaire (Unknown episodes, 1955)
- Damon Runyon Theater (Unknown episodes, 1955)
- Crusader (Unknown episodes, 1955)
- Hot Rod Girl (1956)
- Tales of Wells Fargo (2 episodes, 1957)
- Conflict (3 episodes, 1957)
- Hot Rod Rumble (1957)
- Cheyenne (8 episodes, 1956–1957)
- Colt .45 (1 episode, 1958)
- Maverick (10 episodes, 1957–1959)
- Sugarfoot (8 episodes, 1957–1959)
- Lawman (7 episodes, 1958–1959)
- Straw Men With A Match (1958)
- The Alaskans (1 episode, 1960)
- Bourbon Street Beat (4 episodes, 1959–1960)
- Surfside 6 (1 episode, 1960)
- 77 Sunset Strip (3 episodes, 1958–1961)
- Hawaiian Eye (1 episode, 1961)
- The Roaring 20s (3 episodes, 1960–1961)
- Bronco (2 episodes, 1958–1962)
- Lad A Dog (1962)
- Room for One More (4 episodes, 1962)
- Black Gold (1962)
- FBI Code 98 (1963)
- The Gallant Men (1 episode, 1963)
- PT 109 (1963)
- The Greatest Show on Earth (Unknown episodes, 1963)
- Temple Houston (6 episodes, 1963–1964)
- Kraft Suspense Theatre (1 episode, 1964)
- For Those Who Think Young (1964)
- No Time for Sergeants (1 episode, 1964)
- Hank (Unknown episodes, 1965)
- Run for Your Life (3 episodes, 1965)
- The Double Life of Henry Phyfe (Unknown episodes, 1966)
- Batman (2 episodes, 1966)
- Mister Roberts (4 episodes, 1966)
- Batman: The Movie (1966)
- The Green Hornet (Unknown episodes, 1966)
- Wonder Woman: Who's Afraid of Diana Prince? (1967)
- Fathom (1967)
- The Outcasts (1 episode, 1969)
- The Courtship of Eddie's Father (1 episode, 1969)
- The Challengers (1970)
- The Immortal (3 episodes, 1970)
- Alias Smith and Jones (1 episode, 1971)
- Mrs. Pollifax-Spy (1971)
- The Chicago Teddy Bears (1 episode, 1971)
- Longstreet (1 episode, 1971)
- How to Steal an Airplane (1971)
- Ironside (3 episodes, 1971)
- Ghost Story (1 episode, 1972)
- Love, American Style (4 episodes, 1970–1972)
- Room 222 (1 episode, 1972)
- And Millions Will Die (1973)
- Barnaby Jones (Unknown episodes, 1973)
- Mission: Impossible (9 episodes, 1971–1973)
- The Brady Bunch (1 episode, 1973)
- The Return of Charlie Chan (Uncredited, 1973)
- Dusty's Trail (Unknown episodes, 1973)
- The Magician (Unknown episodes, 1973)
- Mannix (8 episodes, 1969–1974)
- The Swiss Family Robinson (Unknown episodes, 1975)
- The Six Million Dollar Man (1 episode, 1975)
- Cannon (1 episode, 1975)
- Quincy, M.E. (Unknown episodes, 1976)
- Most Wanted (Unknown episodes, 1976)
- Escape from Angola (1976)
- Code R (Unknown episodes, 1977)
- Eight Is Enough (Unknown episodes, 1977)
- Bigfoot and Wildboy (Unknown episodes, 1977)
- Missile X: The Neutron Bomb Incident (1978)
- Fantasy Island (Unknown episodes, 1978)
- Rescue from Gilligan's Island (1978)
- Diff'rent Strokes (Unknown episodes, 1978)
- Wonder Woman (5 episodes, 1978-79)
- The Misadventures of Sheriff Lobo (Unknown episodes, 1979)
- Big Shamus, Little Shamus (Unknown episodes, 1979)
- Buck Rogers in the 25th Century (1 episode, 1979)
- Young Maverick (1 episode, 1979)
- Dallas (4 episodes, 1979–1980)
- Private Benjamin (Unknown episodes, 1981)
- Harper Valley PTA (1 episode, 1982)
- The Kid with the Broken Halo (1982)
- CHiPs (10 episodes, 1981–1982)
- The Kid with the 200 I.Q. (1983)
- The Powers of Matthew Star (2 episodes, 1983)
- Small & Frye (Unknown episodes, 1983)
- Manimal (1 episode, 1983)
- The Fantastic World of D.C. Collins (1984)
- Airwolf (1 episode, 1984)
- Small Wonder (4 episodes, 1986–1988)

== Awards ==
Year	Award	Result	Category	Film or series
1972	Giffoni Film Festival	Won	Golden Gryphon	Batman
2006	Golden Boot Awards	Won	Golden Boot	-
