= FBI Code 98 =

1962 film by Leslie H. Martinson

- Directed by: Leslie H. Martinson
- Written by: Stanley Niss
- Produced by: Stanley Niss
- Starring: Jack Kelly; William Reynolds; Ray Danton; Merry Anders; Andrew Duggan; Philip Carey; Peggy McCay
- Narrated by: William Woodson
- Cinematography: Robert Hoffman
- Edited by: Leo H. Shreve
- Music by: Max Steiner; Howard Jackson
- Distributed by: Warner Bros. Pictures
- Release dates: 1962 (UK); April 8, 1964 (U.S.)
- Running time: 104 min.
- Country: United States
- Language: English

FBI Code 98 is a 1962 crime drama directed by Leslie H. Martinson and produced by Warner Bros. Pictures. Originally intended as television pilot, the film was instead released theatrically in the United Kingdom in 1962, and in the United States in 1963. FBI Code 98 stars many Warner Bros. contract players such as Jack Kelly, Ray Danton, Andrew Duggan and William Reynolds who later costarred on the Warner Bros Television show The F.B.I.. The film was narrated by William Woodson, who had previously narrated the radio show The FBI in Peace and War.

== Plot ==
The president of an electronics company, Alan Nichols (Andrew Duggan), and his two vice presidents, Robert Cannon (Jack Kelly) and Fred Vitale (Ray Danton), are required at Cape Canaveral to oversee the test launching of a missile which their company developed. But before they are able to board the plane to take them there one of their suitcases is switched for one containing a bomb. Cannon opens his luggage when the men are in mid air and discovers the bomb, and his colleague Vitale manages to disarm it. The FBI is called in to determine whether this is a case of attempting to murder Cannon, whose suitcase contained the bomb, or an attempt to sabotage the airplane.

The investigation soon proves that electronics project engineer Petersen made and planted the bomb in the suitcase. Petersen's motivation for doing this is that his son was fired by CEO Nichols, and when failing to blow up the plane he instead tries to blow up Nichols yacht, with the wife and her lover on it. The task for the FBI is to stop this endeavour.

== Cast ==
- Jack Kelly as Robert P. Cannon
- Ray Danton as Fred Vitale
- Andrew Duggan as Alan W. Nichols
- Philip Carey as Inspector Leroy Gifford
- William Reynolds as Special Agent Edward P. Fox
- Peggy McCay as Deborah Cannon
- Kathleen Crowley as Marian Nichols
- Merry Anders as Grace McLean
- Jack Cassidy as Walter Macklin
- Vaughn Taylor as Joseph Petersen
- Eddie Ryder as Lloyd Kinsel
- Ken Lynch as Special Agent in Charge Gibson White
- Charles Cooper as Special Agent Bernard Lyons
- Paul Comi as Special Agent Philip Vaccaro
- Robert Hogan as Timothy Farrell
- Laura Shelton as Anita Davidson
- Robert Ridgely as Carl Rush
- Francis De Sales as Assistant Director
- Bill Quinn as Special Agent Alan Woodward
- Ross Elliott as Special Agent Vernon Lockhart
- William Woodson as Narrator

== Production ==
The Federal Bureau of Investigation cooperated in the filming of FBI Code 98, with sequences filmed in Washington, D.C., and Quantico, Virginia.

The working title of the film was Headquarters F.B.I. with screenwriter and producer Stanley Niss having a novelization of the screenplay published under that title. Niss, a former police reporter, had written episodes for the radio shows Gangbusters and Counterspy and episodes of several Warner Bros. Television shows. Niss also visited the set to smooth difficulties between Ray Danton and director Leslie H. Martinson.

The film reuses Max Steiner's score for The FBI Story arranged by Howard Jackson.

== See also ==
- List of American films of 1962
