= Medical Story =

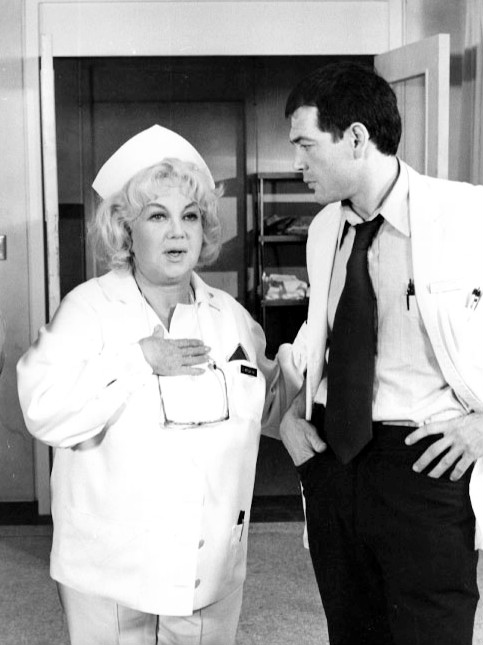
- Ann Sothern and Robert Forster in "The Moonlight Healer".
- Genre: Anthology series Medical drama
- Created by: David Gerber; Abby Mann
- Directed by: Richard Benedict; Robert L. Collins; Gary Nelson; Paul Senesky; Paul Wendkos
- Country of origin: United States
- Original language: English
- No. of seasons: 1
- No. of episodes: 12 (list of episodes)

Production
- Running time: 60 minutes
- Production companies: David Gerber Productions; Columbia Pictures Television

Original release
- Network: NBC
- Release: September 4, 1975 – January 8, 1976

Medical Story is an American anthology series that aired on NBC from September 4, 1975, until January 8, 1976.

== Premise ==
This was an anthology series about issues in the medical field, making it into the medical equivalent of Police Story.

== Episodes ==
| No. | Title | Directed by | Written by | Original release date |
|---|---|---|---|---|
| 1 | "Medical Story" | Gary Nelson | Abby Mann | September 4, 1975 |
A young intern wants to save a patient from a needless hysterectomy. Beau Bridges, Claude Akins, Wendell Burton, Sydney Chaplin, José Ferrer, Harold Gould, Harriet Karr, Shirley Knight, Carl Reiner, Ford Rainey, Madlyn Rhue, Martha Scott, Teddy Wilson, Shelly Novack, and Lillian Bronson star. This is a two-hour pilot episode.
| 2 | "The Right to Die" | Don Medford | Tim Maschler | September 11, 1975 |
A dying elderly woman (Ruth Gordon) is being pressured into surgery by an arrogant doctor (Bradford Dillman); her nurse (Juliet Mills) becomes advocate on her behalf. Richard Mulligan, Marsha Hunt, Sheila Larken, Robert Mandan, Mitzi Hoag, and Gerrit Graham also star.
| 3 | "The God Syndrome" | Paul Wendkos | Arthur A. Ross & Larry Brody | September 18, 1975 |
A young surgeon (Tony Musante) sees medical challenges when he looks at his patients and learns that dealing with human nature helps heal patients. Don Galloway, Leslie Charleson, Peter Mark Richman, Dierdre Lenihan, Edward Winter, Martin E. Brooks, Richard Basehart, and Broderick Crawford also star.
| 4 | "Test Case" | Unknown | Abby Mann | September 25, 1975 |
A right-to-life group targets a doctor after he forgoes an attempt to save a fetus during an abortion. Diane Baker, Colby Chester, Dane Clark, Edith Diaz, Vince Edwards, Pernell Roberts, Malachi Throne, and Laurie Walters star.
| 5 | "A Life in the Balance" | Unknown | Unknown | October 18, 1975 |
A medical student feels the pressure of working at a large hospital. Edward Albert, David Arkin, Desi Arnaz Jr., Meredith Baxter, Doris Dowling, Arnold Johnson, John Kerr, Rick Lenz, Peggy McCay, and Stephen McNally star.
| 6 | "An Air Full of Death" | Ralph Senensky | George Bellak | October 9, 1975 |
A doctor (Cliff Gorman) investigates cancer-causing chemicals at a manufacturing plant but the plant physician who's also his friend (Clu Gulager) conceals the medical record of the workers. Shelley Fabares, Michael Callan, Burr DeBenning, Tom Drake, and Howard Duff also star.
| 7 | "Million Dollar Baby" | Paul Wendkos | E. Arthur Kean | October 23, 1975 |
A doctor gets a malpractice suit from a woman he helped deliver 22 years earlier. Whitney Blake, Geraldine Brooks, Catherine Burns, Allen Case, Julie Cobb, John Forsythe, Farley Granger, Mark Jenkins, William Kerwin, Kim Richards, Patricia Smith, and David White star.
| 8 | "The Moonlight Healer" | Richard Benedict | Abby Mann | October 30, 1975 |
A first year resident moonlights in the emergency room. Rosemary DeCamp, Leif Erickson, Robert Forster, Sam Jaffe, Ann Sothern, and Christopher Stone star.
| 9 | "Wasteland" | Unknown | Abby Mann | November 13, 1975 |
A doctor tries to convince his low-income patients into being sterilized. Ralph Bellamy, Christopher Connelly, William Daniels, Nora Heflin, Judd Hirsch, Collin Wilcox Paxton, Madge Sinclair, and Susan Strasberg star.
| 10 | "Us Against the World" | Unknown | Rita Lakin | December 4, 1975 |
Three female interns have to deal with a leukemia patient, a chauvinistic surgeon and an unstable child. Meredith Baxter, Christine Belford, Theodore Bikel, Lonny Chapman, Sam Groom, Richard Kelton, Michael LeClai, Allyn Ann McLerie, Donna Mills, Janis Paige, Linda Purl, Maxine Stuart star.
| 11 | "Woman in White" | Unknown | Unknown | December 11, 1975 |
A doctor wants a breast cancer patient to have a less radical surgery. Hope Lange, Richard Kiley, Joan Van Ark, Monte Markham, Bert Convy, Paul Mantee, Alan Feinstein, Karen Carlson, Dee Timberlake, Gayle Rogers, and Victor Millan star.
| 12 | "The Quality of Mercy" | Robert L. Collins | Robert L. Collins | January 8, 1976 |
A group of doctors fight a board of supervisors who are unwilling to allocate funds to raise public health standards. Scott Hylands, Tony Musante, Dabney Coleman, Harold Gould, Don Mitchell, Catherine Burns, Arthur Franz, Mark Lambert, Robert Mandan, Ross Bickell, Jan Clayton, Helmut Dantine, Linda Gillen, and Richard Partlow also star. This is a two-hour episode.
