= Room for One More (film) =

1952 film directed by Norman Taurog

- Film poster
- Directed by: Norman Taurog
- Screenplay by: Jack Rose; Melville Shavelson
- Based on: Room for One More; 1950 book by Anna Perrott Rose
- Produced by: Henry Blanke
- Starring: Cary Grant; Betsy Drake
- Cinematography: Robert Burks
- Edited by: Alan Crosland Jr.
- Music by: Max Steiner
- Color process: Black and white
- Production company: Warner Bros. Pictures
- Distributed by: Warner Bros. Pictures
- Release date: January 26, 1952
- Running time: 98 minutes
- Country: United States
- Language: English
- Budget: $1,079,000
- Box office: $2.75 million (US)

Room for One More is a 1952 American family comedy-drama film directed by Norman Taurog, produced by Henry Blanke, and starring Cary Grant and Betsy Drake. The screenplay, written by Jack Rose and Melville Shavelson, was based on the 1950 autobiography of the same name by Anna Perrott Rose. It was the second and last film that the then-married Grant and Drake made together.

== Plot ==
Anna Rose visits an orphanage and decides to foster a child. Jane, a very unhappy 13-year-old, moves in with Anna, her engineer husband, George "Poppy" Rose, and their three children (Trot, Tim, and Teenie) for two weeks. Resentful at first, Jane eventually forms a bond with the Roses. When Jane's two-week visit comes to an end, it is Poppy who decides to let her stay.

Anna decides to foster another child over the summer. The child is Jimmy-John, a 12-year-old who walks with leg braces. Jimmy-John initially has trouble fitting in with the Roses. He refuses to speak, punches Trot in the face, and smashes Tim's new bicycle out of frustration for his inability to ride with the other kids. It is later discovered that Jimmy-John can barely read and must be tutored by Anna. The Roses consider taking Jimmy-John back to the orphanage due to his behavior. However, the children vote to keep him. By the end of the summer, Jane and Jimmy-John become full members of the family.

Jimmy-John becomes interested in joining the Boy Scouts after going to a meeting held by Tim's troop. After joining Tim's troop, Jimmy-John is eager to improve his reading skills so that he can read the scout handbook. Being a Boy Scout proves to be rewarding for Jimmy-John, as it ends up bettering his self-esteem.

On the night of a grade school New Year's Eve dance, it is discovered that the mother of Jane's date, Ben Roberts, has forbidden him from taking her. Jane winds up going with Tim despite a four-year age gap. Poppy goes to Ben's house and brings him to the dance with his father's blessing. However, Jane decides to dance with Poppy instead of Ben.

After a lot of hard work, Jimmy-John earns the coveted Eagle Scout rank at a Court of Honor. During his acceptance speech, Jimmy-John informs the scouts in the audience that he had a head start by picking his parents.

== Cast ==
- Cary Grant as George Rose
- Betsy Drake as Anna Perrott Rose
- Lurene Tuttle as Miss Kenyon
- Randy Stuart as Gladys Foreman
- John Ridgely as Harry Foreman
- Irving Bacon as Mayor Michael J. Kane
- Mary Treen as Mrs. Roberts (as Mary Lou Treen)
- Iris Mann as Jane Miller
- George Winslow as Teenie
- Clifford Tatum Jr. as Jimmy John Wilson
- Gay Gordon as Trot
- Malcolm Cassell as Tim
- Larry Olsen as Benji Roberts

== Television series ==
A decade later, Andrew Duggan and Peggy McCay starred in a TV sitcom series version of the film also titled Room for One More.
