= Peggy McCay =

American actress (1927-2018)

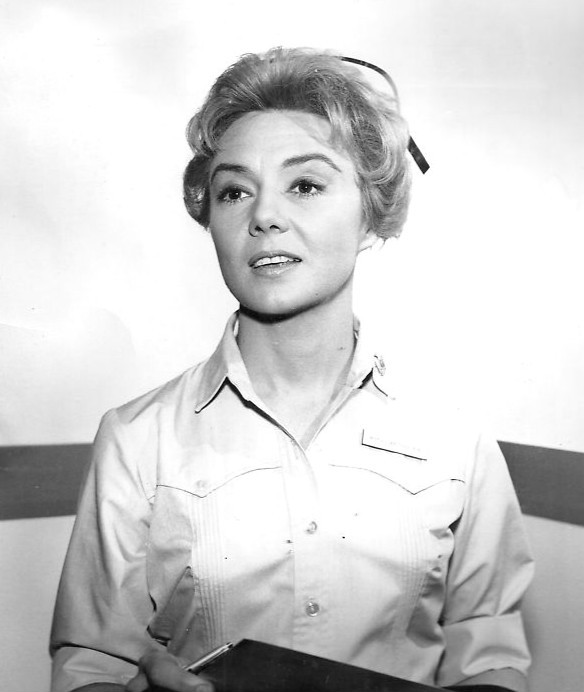
- McCay on Ben Casey (in 1964)
- Born: Margaret Ann McCay; November 3, 1927; Manhattan, New York City, U.S.
- Died: October 7, 2018 (aged 90); Los Angeles, California, U.S.
- Education: Barnard College
- Occupation: Actress
- Years active: 1949–2016

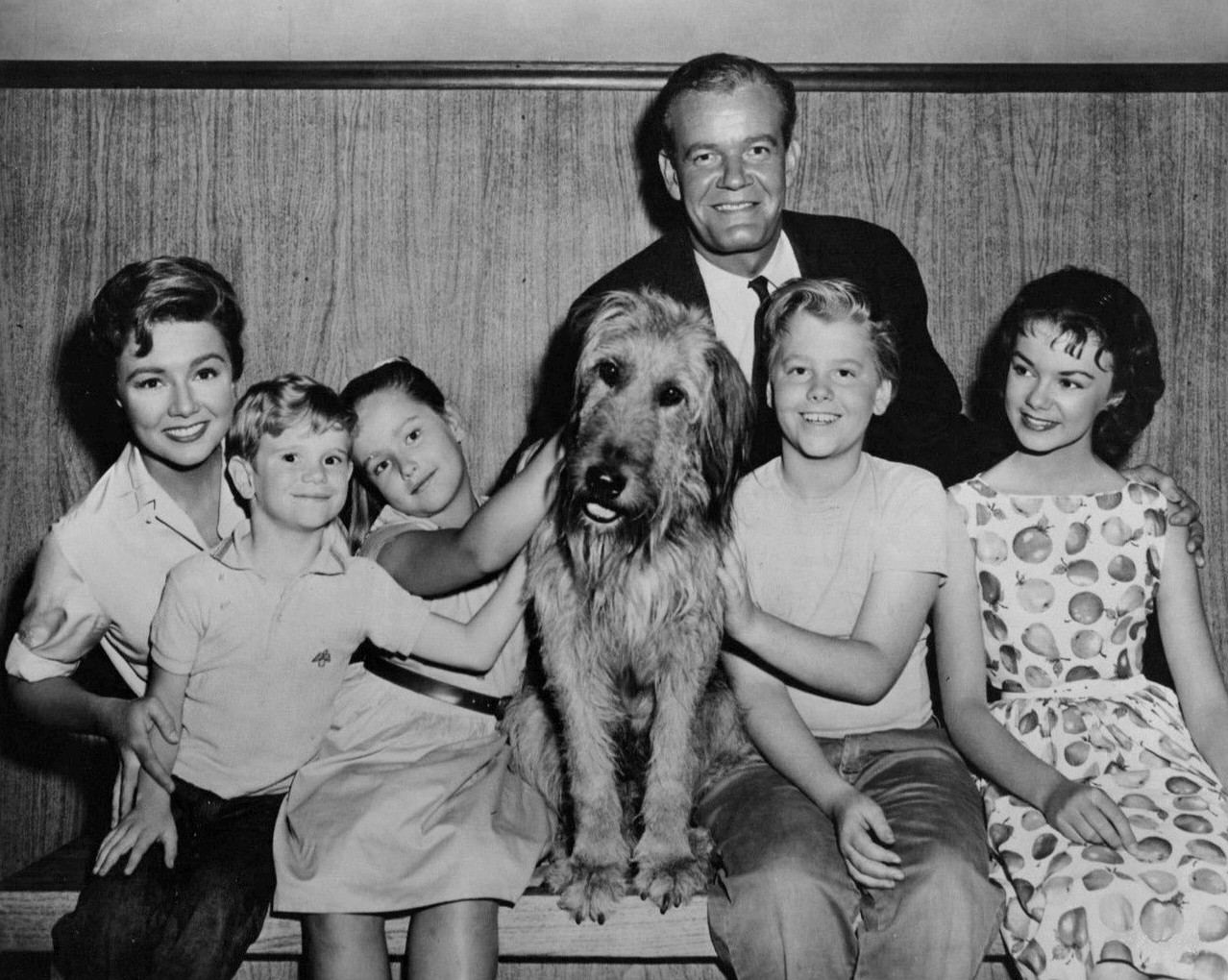
McCay, Ronnie Dapo, Carol Nicholson, Andrew Duggan, Tim Rooney and Ahna Capri in Room for One More, 1962

Margaret Ann "Peggy" McCay (November 3, 1927 – October 7, 2018) was an American actress whose career began in 1949, and includes theatre, television, soap operas, and feature films. McCay may be best known for originating the roles of Vanessa Dale on the CBS soap opera Love of Life (a role she played from 1951 to 1955), and Caroline Brady, which she played from 1983 to 2016 on NBC's Days of Our Lives.

== Life and career ==
McCay was born on November 3, 1927. She was the daughter of Mr. and Mrs. Michael J. McCay. McCay attended Saint Walburga's Convent School and Barnard College, graduating from the latter in June 1949. After her father's sudden death, she and her mother ran his construction company for a period of time.

Following her graduation from college, McCay joined impresaria Margo Jones's Texas-based theatre company and graduated to repertory, where she essayed numerous roles. She also studied with Lee Strasberg in New York and later helped to set up Strasberg's West Coast studio. In New York one of her first roles was in a 1956 off-Broadway production of Chekhov's Uncle Vanya, playing opposite Franchot Tone. Her role as Sonya in Uncle Vanya earned her an Obie Award for Best Young Actress of the Year in an off-Broadway production. The next year both she and Tone reprised their respective roles in the Hollywood film version of the play.

McCay accepted her first major role as the heroine Vanessa Dale on the soap opera Love of Life, which premiered in 1951. After four years, she left in 1955 to pursue other options.

In 1958 she appeared on Gunsmoke as “Flora”, a woman freed from an abusive marriage by the actions of her town drunk father whom she never knew (played by John Dehner) in “Bottleman” (S3E28). That same year she appeared on Perry Mason as defendant Stephanie Falkner in "The Case of the Long-Legged Models", and in 1959 as fraudster Melissa Maybrook in the Maverick episode "The Sheriff of Duck 'n' Shoot" with James Garner and Jack Kelly. She also appeared as a supporting character in the Maverick episode titled "Kiz" starring Roger Moore and Kathleen Crowley. Soon after, she was cast in an episode of the CBS anthology series, Appointment with Adventure. She appeared in four feature films in the late 1950s before landing a lead role in 1962 in the ABC television series Room for One More as Anna Perrott Rose, who had written a memoir about her family life as a foster mother; Andrew Duggan portrayed the part that Cary Grant had played in the original movie version a decade earlier. In 1962, McCay starred in the feature film Lad, A Dog.

She played Sally Mitchell opposite Robert Sterling and MacDonald Carey in "House Guest" on the Alfred Hitchcock Hour Season 1 Episode 8 which aired on November 7, 1962. On February 4, 1963, she appeared as Sheriff Andy Taylor's old girlfriend Sharon DeSpain in the "Class Reunion" episode of The Andy Griffith Show. On April 9, 1963, McCay appeared in the episode "Broken Honor" of NBC's Laramie; she and Rod Cameron played Martha and Roy Halloran, a farm couple.

McCay guest-starred on ABC's The Roaring 20s, The Greatest Show on Earth, and Jason Evers's Channing. In 1963, she appeared on NBC's Redigo, with Richard Egan, and on CBS's Perry Mason (as defendant Margaret Layton in "The Case of the Skeleton's Closet"). In 1963 she was in an episode of The Virginian as Helen Hammond Judson, a woman seeking her husband. In 1964, after guest starring in The Fugitive episode "The Garden House," she returned to daytime television as a lead on ABC's The Young Marrieds. When the show went off the air in 1966, she was written into the story line on ABC's General Hospital (as Iris Fairchild) from March 1967 to January 1970. In the 1970s, McCay appeared in Eleanor and Franklin: The White House Years, How the West Was Won, The Lazarus Syndrome and Barnaby Jones (episode titled, "Blind Terror"). She appeared in a 1975 television movie, John O'Hara's Gibbsville (also known as The Turning Point of Jim Malloy), and was a regular in the cast of the short-lived 1976 series Gibbsville. During the late 1970s and early 1980s, she had a recurring role as Marion Hume in the CBS drama Lou Grant. In 1991, McCay was awarded a Primetime Emmy for Outstanding Guest Actress in a Drama Series for The Trials of Rosie O'Neill.

She may be best known as matriarch Caroline Brady on Days of Our Lives. McCay first appeared on the program in February 1983. After signing a long-term contract in 1985, she played the character of Caroline on a regular basis for over thirty years. Her final appearance in the role was aired August 24, 2016.

== Death ==
On October 7, 2018, McCay died from natural causes at her home in Los Angeles. She never married nor had children, leaving no immediate survivors.

== Filmography ==
=== Film ===
Year	Title	Role	Notes
1957	Uncle Vanya	Sofia	
1958	The Case Against Brooklyn	Mrs. Jane Harris	
1962	Lad: A Dog	Elizabeth Tremayne	
1963	FBI Code 98	Deborah Cannon	
1979	Promises in the Dark	Mrs. Pritikin	
1981	Amy	Mrs. Grimes	
1981	Bustin' Loose	Gladys Schuyler	
1983	Second Thoughts	Dr. Martha Carpenter	
1984	Uforia	Celia Martin	
1985	Murphy's Romance	Mrs. Willis	
1987	No Man's Land	Benjy's Mom	
1996	Daddy's Girl	Grandmother	
2011	Let Go	Helen	

=== Television ===
Year	Title	Role	Notes
1949–1950	Kraft Television Theatre		2 episodes
1949–1951	The Philco Television Playhouse		2 episodes
1950	Cameo Theatre		Season 1 Episode 8: "The Canon's Curtain"
1951	Somerset Maugham TV Theatre		Season 2 Episode 8: "The French Governor"
1951	Crime Photographer		Season 1 Episode 14: "Sudden Death"
1951–1955	Love of Life	Vanessa Dale	Series regular 38 episodes
1952	Hallmark Hall of Fame		Season 1 Episode 38: "The Bride's Teapot"
1952	Campbell Playhouse		Episode: "Forty Odd"
1954	Omnibus	Hilde (segment: "Hilde and the Turnpike", as Peggy McKay)	Season 2 Episode 22: "Hilde and the Turnpike"
1954	Love Story		Season 1 Episode 4: "The Arms of the Law"
1954	Danger		Season 5 Episode 7: "Death Is My Neighbor"
1954	Mayor of the Town		Season 1 Episode 6: "Thicker Than Water"
1955	The United States Steel Hour	Agatha	Season 2 Episode 16: "The Rack"
1955	Appointment with Adventure	Harriet Fletcher	Season 2 Episode 12: "The Big Mistake"
1956	Goodyear Television Playhouse	Sue	Season 5 Episode 15: "Joey"
1956	Camera Three		Season 1 Episode 26: "Stanislavsky and the Actor"
1956–1957	Armstrong Circle Theatre	Ursula Stienz (as Peggy McKay) / Mrs. Robertshaw	2 episodes
1956–1958	Matinee Theater	Edith / Eugenie Grandet / Irene / Jane Wilson / Louise Grannick / Irene Dayton / Margaret	12 episodes
1957	Studio One	Claire	Season 9 Episode 16: "Dead of Noon"
1957	Robert Montgomery Presents	Grizel McGregor	Season 8 Episode 30: "A Slice of Life"
1957	Lux Video Theatre	Jeanne (as Peggy McKay)	Season 7 Episode 41: "The Softest Music"
1957	The Court of Last Resort		Season 1 Episode 8: "The Darlene Fitzgerald Case"
1957	The Californians	Bess Cooper	Season 1 Episode 10: "The Magic Box"
1957	Alfred Hitchcock Presents	Myra Herbert	Season 3 Episode 11: "The Deadly"
1957	The Adventures of Jim Bowie	Nekeeta / Malvina Creel	2 episodes
1958	The Investigator		Season 1 Episode 10: "Episode #1.10"
1958–1963	Perry Mason	Stephanie Falkner / Margaret Layton	2 episodes
1958–1971	Gunsmoke	Flora / Mrs. Cooter / Pene Lynott	3 episodes
1959	The David Niven Show	Ann Thompson	Season 1 Episode 11: "Sticks and Stones"
1959	The Alaskans	Madeleine Rondolet	Season 1 Episode 4: "Petticoat Crew"
1959	Play of the Week	Vary	Season 1 Episode 12: "The Cherry Orchard"
1959–1960	Maverick	Melissa 'Missy' Maybrook / Polly Goodin / Melissa Bouchet	3 episodes
1960–1961	The Roaring 20's	Martha 'Topeka' Jones / Libby Norton	2 episodes
1960–1961	77 Sunset Strip	Eunice Rice / Fay Dakota	2 episodes
1960–1963	Hawaiian Eye	Grace Stanley / Julia Tyler Brand / Lucy McDowell / Helena Ogden	4 episodes
1961	Lawman	Cassie Nickerson	Season 3 Episode 32: "Whiphand"
1961–1962	Surfside 6	Ann Wayne / Nicole Crane	2 episodes
1962	Room for One More	Anna Rose	Series regular
1962	Wide Country	Mildred Price	Season 1 Episode 11: "The Bravest Man in the World"
1962–1964	The Alfred Hitchcock Hour	Sally Mitchell / Mrs. Grainger	2 episodes
1963	The Andy Griffith Show	Sharon DeSpain	Season 3 Episode 19: "Class Reunion"
1963	Laramie	Martha Halloran	Season 4 Episode 26: "Broken Honor"
1963	The Greatest Show on Earth	Anne	Season 1 Episode 5: "Garve"
1963	Redigo	Jessie Graham	Season 1 Episode 13: "Privilege of a Man"
1963	The Virginian	Helen Hammond Judson	Season 2 Episode 14: "Man of Violence"
1964	The Fugitive	Ann Guthrie (as Peggy McKay)	Season 1 Episode 16: "The Garden House"
1964	Channing	Joan Carlyle	Season 1 Episode 23: "Wave Goodbye to Our Fair-Haired Boy"
1964	The Great Adventure	Mrs. Callaway	2 episodes
1964	Slattery's People	Evelyn Breland	Season 1 Episode 11: "Question: Do the Ignorant Sleep in Pure White Beds?"
1964	Ben Casey	Doris Farrow / Helen Todd	2 episodes
1964	Profiles in Courage	Margaret	Season 1 Episode 5: "Sam Houston"
1964–1966	The Young Marrieds	Susan Garret	Series regular 211 episodes
1966–1972	The F.B.I.	Marie Lennan / Helen Lowe / Margaret Collins / Mrs. Barrows	4 episodes
1968	General Hospital	Iris Fairchild	Episode 1460: "Episode #1.1460"
1970	The Interns	Alice Vaughn	Season 1 Episode 4: "An Afternoon in the Fall"
1971	Make Room for Granddady	Rita	Season 1 Episode 14: "Cheating the Cheater"
1971	The City	Mrs. Lockney	TV Movie
1971	Bonanza	Pat Griswold	Season 13 Episode 3: "Bushwhacked!"
1971	A Death of Innocence	Helen McCloud	TV Movie
1972	Longstreet	Mrs. Ames	Season 1 Episode 22: "Through Shattering Glass"
1972	The Rookies	Mrs. Sloan	Season 1 Episode 6: "Time Is the Fire"
1972–1974	Marcus Welby, M.D.	Sister Joanna / Jane Stewart	2 episodes
1973	The Girl with Something Extra	The Judge	Season 1 Episode 8: "No Benefit of Doubt"
1973–1975	Barnaby Jones	Mrs. Benedict / Mrs. Tatum / Rose Ballinger	3 episodes
1974	The Streets of San Francisco	Nurse	Season 3 Episode 3: "Target: Red"
1974	The Manhunter	Nurse Oldham	Season 1 Episode 4: "Death on the Run"
1974	The Waltons	Mrs. Thomas	Season 3 Episode 11: "The Job"
1975	S.W.A.T.	Laura Huston	Season 1 Episode 2: "A Coven of Killers"
1975	The Turning Point of Jim Malloy	Mrs. Malloy	TV Movie
1975	Medical Story	(as Peggy McKay)	Season 1 Episode 4: "A Life in the Balance"
1976	Eleanor and Franklin	Grace Tully	Miniseries
1976	Cannon	Nancy Strickland	Season 5 Episode 22: "Point After Death"
1976	Most Wanted	Sylvia Markle	Season 1 Episode 5: "The Wolf Pack Killer"
1976–1977	Gibbsville	Mrs. Malloy	Series regular
1977	Eleanor and Franklin: The White House Years	Grace Tully	TV Movie
1977	Good Against Evil	Irene	TV Movie
1977	ABC Afterschool Specials	Mrs. Calder	Season 6 Episode 1: "Hewitt's Just Different"
1977	Kojak	Mrs. Smith	Season 5 Episode 5: "Once More from Birdland"
1977	Logan's Run	Dr. Mildred Krim	Season 1 Episode 7: "Crypt"
1978	Loose Change	Mrs. Berenson	Miniseries; Season 1 Episode 1: "Part I: School Days, School Days"
1978	How the West Was Won	Maggie Taylor	4 episodes
1978	A Question of Love	Nurse (uncredited)	TV Movie
1978	The Amazing Spider-Man	Dr. Davis	Season 2 Episode 4: "The Kirkwood Haunting"
1978–1982	Quincy M.E.	Sister / Irene Jordan	2 episodes
1978–1982	Lou Grant	Marian Hume	9 episodes
1979	The Lazarus Syndrome	Stacy	TV Movie
1979	The Lazarus Syndrome	Stacy	2 episodes
1979	Mrs. R's Daughter	Mrs. Burroughs	TV Movie
1979	Archie Bunker's Place	Margaret	Season 1 Episode 13: "Man of the Year"
1979	The Fisher Family	Maria Schmidt	Episode: "Tina"
1980	Love at First Sight	Mrs. Bellamy	TV Movie
1980	Fighting Back: The Story of Rocky Bleier	Ellen Bleier	TV Movie
1980	Mark, I Love You	Margaret Hamilton	TV Movie
1982	Two of a Kind	Nurse Harris	TV Movie
1982–1985	Cagney & Lacey	Mrs. Moline / Mrs. Carruthers	2 episodes
1983	Wait Till Your Mother Gets Home!	Cynthia Peters	TV Movie
1983	The Powers of Matthew Star	Alice Wellman	Season 1 Episode 15: "Dead Man's Hand"
1983	The Jeffersons	Shirley Schneider	Season 9 Episode 25: "Silver Lining"
1983	St. Elsewhere	Claire Fields	2 episodes
1983	Newhart	Flo McKenna (as Peggy Mc Cay)	Season 2 Episode 6: "Don't Rain on My Parade"
1983	Memorial Day	Mrs. Gibbs	TV Movie
1983–2016	Days of Our Lives	Caroline Brady	Series regular 1572 episodes
1984	Night Court	Louise Kerr	Season 1 Episode 1: "All You Need Is Love"
1984	Gimme a Break!	Robin Thornton	Season 3 Episode 22: "Class of '84"
1984	Airwolf	Mrs. Taggart	Season 2 Episode 8: "HX-1"
1985	Hardcastle and McCormick	Dr. Coley (as Peggy McKay)	Season 2 Episode 13: "Too Rich and Too Thin"
1985	Highway to Heaven	Louise	Season 1 Episode 15: "One Winged Angels"
1987	Deadly Care	Dorothy Halloran	TV Movie
1987	J.J. Starbuck	Theresa Giotto	Season 1 Episode 3: "Murder in E Minor"
1987–1988	I Married Dora	Lucille Farrell	2 episodes
1988	A Year in the Life	Miriam Charters	Season 1 Episode 17: "Fathers and Other Strangers"
1988	Winnie	Mrs. McKenna	TV Movie
1989	Amityville Horror: The Evil Escapes	Helen Royce	TV Movie
1990	His & Hers		Season 1 Episode 3: "M Is for the Many Things She Lifted"
1990	Hardball	Mrs. Paladino	Season 1 Episode 13: "A Death in the Family"
1991	The Trials of Rosie O'Neill	Irene Hayes	Season 1 Episode 13: "State of Mind"
1992	The Commish	Mary O'Grady	Season 2 Episode 4: "The Rolodex Madame"
1993	L.A. Law	Patricia Holtz	Season 7 Episode 9: "Odor in the Court"
1993	Woman on the Run: The Lawrencia Bembenek Story	Virginia Bembenek	TV Movie
1997	Alien Nation: The Udara Legacy	Avra	TV Movie
1997	Profiler	Melinda Gillespie	2 episodes
1999	Providence	Dorothy Chenoweth	Season 1 Episode 12: "Saint Syd"
1999	Silk Hope	Arleen Mason	TV Movie
2000	Judging Amy	Phyllis Younger	Season 2 Episode 3: "Instincts"
2001	James Dean	Emma Dean	TV Movie
2007	The Irish Vampire Goes West	Aunt Margaret	Video
2010	Cold Case	Zelda Panay '10	Season 7 Episode 14: "Metamorphosis"

== Awards and nominations ==
List of acting awards and nominations
Year	Award	Category	Title	Result	Ref.
1956	Obie Award	Distinguished Performance by an Actress	Uncle Vanya	Won	
1986	Daytime Emmy Award	Outstanding Lead Actress in a Drama Series	Days of Our Lives	Nominated	
1986	Primetime Emmy Award	Outstanding Guest Performer in a Drama Series	Cagney & Lacey	Nominated	
1987	Daytime Emmy Award	Outstanding Supporting Actress in a Drama Series	Days of Our Lives	Nominated	
1991	Primetime Emmy Award	Outstanding Guest Actress in a Drama Series	The Trials of Rosie O'Neill	Won	
1993	Primetime Emmy Award	Outstanding Supporting Actress in a Miniseries or a Special	Woman on the Run: The Lawrencia Bembenek Story	Nominated	
1994	Gemini Awards	Best Performance by an Actress in a Supporting Role	Woman on the Run: The Lawrencia Bembenek Story	Nominated	
2013	Daytime Emmy Award	Outstanding Lead Actress in a Drama Series	Days of Our Lives	Nominated	
2015	Daytime Emmy Award	Outstanding Lead Actress in a Drama Series	Days of Our Lives	Nominated	
2016	Daytime Emmy Award	Outstanding Supporting Actress in a Drama Series	Days of Our Lives	Nominated	
