= Piranha (1972 film) =

- Directed by: William Gibson
- Written by: Richard Finder
- Produced by: Luis Guillermo and Villegas Blanco
- Starring: William Smith; Peter Brown; Ahna Capri; Tom Simcox
- Cinematography: Luis Jacko
- Edited by: Thea Bentler
- Music by: Richard LaSalle
- Production company: Magellan Productions
- Distributed by: Seventh Seal Distribution
- Release date: 1972
- Running time: 94 minutes
- Country: United States
- Language: English

Piranha, also known as Piranha, Piranha or Caribe, is a 1972 Venezuelan adventure-thriller film starring William Smith, Peter Brown and Ahna Capri. Smith and Brown had previously starred together in the Laredo Western TV series.

== Plot ==
Art Greene (Tom Simcox) and his sister Terry (Ahna Capri) are a couple of wildlife photographers exploring the Amazon region with their American guide Jim Pendrake (Peter Brown). They stumble across a deadly predator when they meet Caribe (William Smith), a homicidal maniac whose hobbies include tracking and hunting human prey.

== Cast ==
- William Smith as Caribe
- Peter Brown as Jim Pendrake
- Ahna Capri as Terry Greene
- Tom Simcox as Art Greene
- John Villegas as Juan
- Julie Teca as Girl
- Ernie Fracis as Diamond Miner
- Miguel Berzares as Miguel
- Andres Delgado as Bartender

== Home media ==
Piranha was first released on DVD in 2000.
