= Andrew Duggan =

American actor (1923–1988)

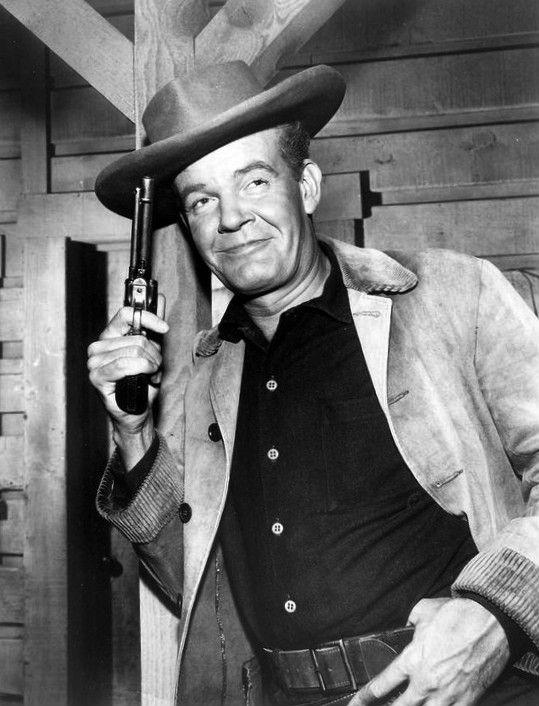
- Duggan as a guest star on the ABC/Warner Brothers western television series, Lawman (1962)
- Born: December 28, 1923; Franklin, Indiana, U.S.
- Died: May 15, 1988 (aged 64); Hollywood, California, U.S.
- Occupations: Actor; director; screenwriter
- Years active: 1949–1987
- Spouse: Elizabeth Logue (m. 1953)
- Children: 3

Andrew Duggan (December 28, 1923 – May 15, 1988) was an American character actor. His work includes 185 screen credits between 1949 and 1987 for roles in both film and television, as well a number more on stage.

== Background ==
Duggan was born in Franklin, Johnson County, Indiana. During World War II, he served in the United States Army 40th Special Services Company, led by actor Melvyn Douglas in the China Burma India Theater of World War II. His contact with Douglas later led to his performing with Lucille Ball in the play Dreamgirl. Duggan developed a friendship with Broadway director Daniel Mann on a troop ship when returning from the war. Duggan appeared on Broadway in The Rose Tattoo, Gently Does It, Anniversary Waltz, Fragile Fox, and The Third Best Sport.

Duggan appeared in some 70 films and in more than 140 television programs between 1949 and 1987. In film he appeared in Westerns, war pictures, political thrillers, dramas, horror films, and other genres, generally assaying authority figures. Among his roles were playing a pastor and padre, sheriff and warden, doctor and professor, numerous judges and generals, and three times the President of the United States.

Duggan did voice-over work including Ziebart's 1985 Clio Award-winning "Friend of the Family (Rust in Peace)" television commercial.

== On film, television, and stage ==
In 1957, Duggan appeared as Major Ellwood in the TV Western Cheyenne in the episode titled "Land Beyond the Law". He appeared on Gunsmoke in the episode titled "Cheap Labor" in 1957. He played a villain in the first episode of NBC's Wagon Train. That same year, he was cast with Peter Brown and Bob Steele in the guest cast of the first episode of the ABC/Warner Bros. series, Colt .45, starring Wayde Preston as Christopher Colt, an undercover agent and pistol salesman in the Old West. In the opening episode, "The Peacemaker" or "Judgment Day", Duggan plays Jim Rexford; Brown is cast as Dave, and Steele as Sergeant Granger. He made three Westerns for Columbia Pictures in 1957 and 1958.

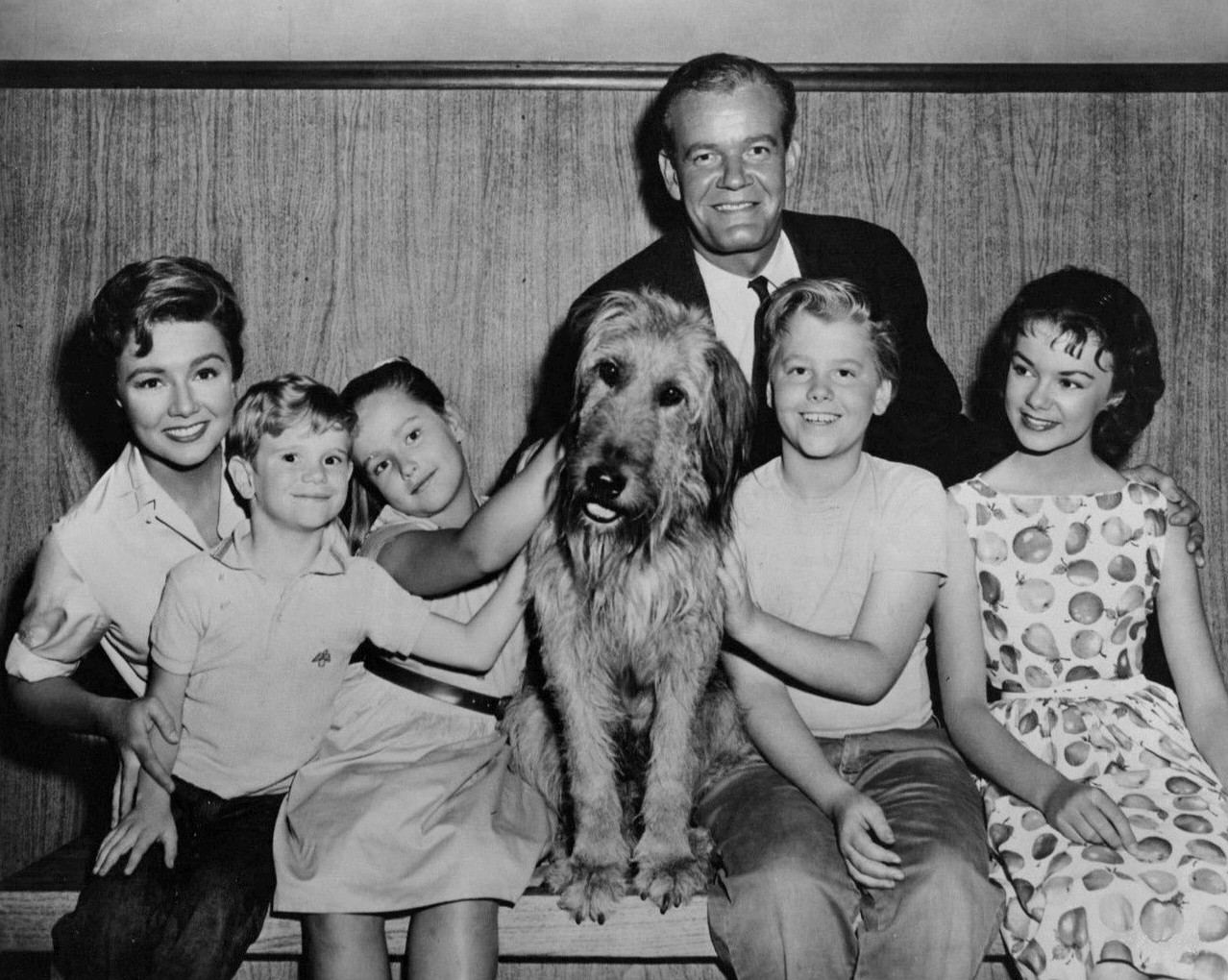
Peggy McCay, Ronnie Dapo, Carol Nicholson, Tramp the dog and Andrew Duggan, Tim Rooney and Ahna Capri in Room for One More (1962)

In 1959, Duggan was contracted to Warner Brothers Television where he was cast in ABC's Bourbon Street Beat, in which he portrayed Cal Calhoun, the head of a New Orleans detective agency. Bourbon Street Beat was canceled after a single season.

During this time, Duggan guest-starred in several Warner Bros. television series and appeared in several Warner Bros. films, including The Chapman Report and Merrill's Marauders, and the television pilot FBI Code 98. He also provide narration for several Warner Bros. film trailers.

Duggan guest-starred in numerous television series in the 1960s, including the Western Tombstone Territory in the episode "The Epitaph". He appeared as an incorrigible criminal trying to gain amnesty in the 1962 episode "Sunday" of the ABC/WB series, Lawman, starring John Russell. In 1963, he guest-starred on the short-lived ABC/WB Western series, The Dakotas.

Duggan was cast on Jack Palance's ABC circus drama, The Greatest Show on Earth and the NBC medical drama about psychiatry, The Eleventh Hour in the role of Carl Quincy in the 1963 episode entitled "Four Feet in the Morning". He played the over-protective Police Chief Dixon in the 1963 spring break film Palm Springs Weekend, in which he attempts to prevent his daughter from seeing student Jim Munroe (Troy Donahue). In 1965, he appeared on David Janssen's ABC series, The Fugitive. Duggan had recurring roles on CBS's 90-minute Western, Cimarron Strip, and on ABC's The Great Adventure. He had a recurring role as General Ed Britt in the second and third seasons of the ABC war series, 12 O'Clock High.

He performed in a pivotal supporting role in the 1964 film, Seven Days in May starring Burt Lancaster, Kirk Douglas, Ava Gardner and Fredric March, and played the U.S. President and an imposter in the 1967 film, In Like Flint with James Coburn. Duggan was cast in a 1964 episode of The Alfred Hitchcock Hour entitled "The McGregor Affair".

In 1966, he played Father Michael in "The Eighth Day", an episode of Bob Hope Presents the Chrysler Theatre. That same year, he appeared on F Troop as Major Chester Winster, in the episode "The New I. G.". He also played Brigadier/Major General Ed Britt (seasons two and three) in the ABC TV series 12 O'clock High.

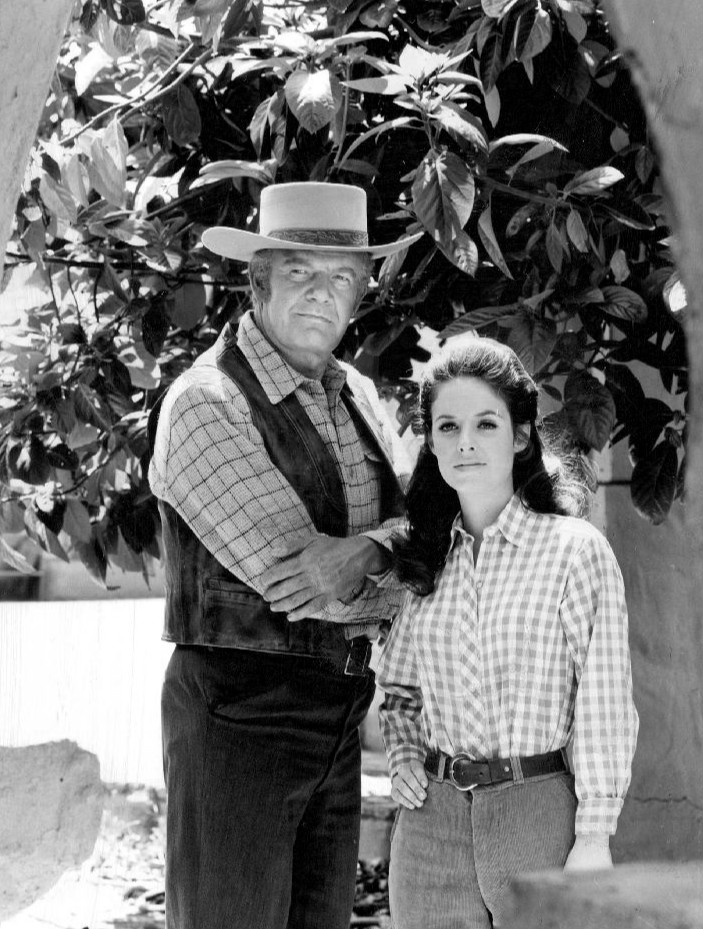
Duggan and Elizabeth Baur in Lancer (1968)

Duggan played a leading role as cattle baron Murdoch Lancer in the 1968–1970 series Lancer.

Duggan played John Walton in the television film, The Homecoming: A Christmas Story (1971). In the TV series it inspired, The Waltons, the role of John Walton was played by Ralph Waite. Even earlier, Henry Fonda had played essentially the same role in the movie based on Earl Hamner's writing that inspired them both, Spencer's Mountain (1963), although the character's name was different.

In 1973, Duggan had a cameo appearance in the blaxploitation film Black Caesar. In 1974, he portrayed General Maxwell D. Taylor in the TV docudrama The Missiles Of October. He appeared as FBI Inspector Ryder in the 1975 NBC-TV movie Attack on Terror: The FBI vs. the Ku Klux Klan, and had roles in the 1976 TV miniseries Rich Man, Poor Man and Once an Eagle. In 1978, he appeared in the episode "And the Sea Shall Give Up Her Dead" of the NBC crime drama The Eddie Capra Mysteries. In 1980, he appeared as Sam Wiggins in the ABC television movie The Long Days of Summer.

One of Duggan's last roles was as Dwight D. Eisenhower in a TV biography called J. Edgar Hoover (1987), a role he had played earlier in the NBC miniseries, Backstairs at the White House (1979). He also played President Lyndon B. Johnson in a different biography of Hoover, The Private Files of J. Edgar Hoover (1977). He played Judge Axel in A Return to Salem's Lot (1987).

== Personal life and death ==
Duggan in 1953 married Broadway dancer and actress Elizabeth Logue, whom he called Betty. They had three children.

Duggan died of throat cancer on May 15, 1988.

== Partial filmography ==
=== Film ===
- Patterns (1956) - Mr. Jameson
- Three Brave Men (1956) - Pastor Stephen Browning
- Domino Kid (1957) - Wade Harrington
- Decision at Sundown (1957) - Sheriff Swede Hansen
- Return to Warbow (1958) - Murray Fallam
- The Bravados (1958) - Padre
- Westbound (1959) - Clay Putnam
- Splendor in the Grass (1961) - Trailer Narrator (voice, uncredited)
- House of Women (1962) - Warden Frank Cole
- Merrill's Marauders (1962) - Capt. Abraham Lewis Kolodny, MD
- The Chapman Report (1962) - Dr. George C. Chapman
- PT 109 (1963) - Narrator (uncredited)
- Palm Springs Weekend (1963) - Police Chief Dixon
- The Incredible Mr. Limpet (1964) - Harlock
- Seven Days in May (1964) - Col. William 'Mutt' Henderson
- The Glory Guys (1965) - Gen. Frederick McCabe
- In Like Flint (1967) - U.S. President Trent
- The Secret War of Harry Frigg (1968) - Gen. Newton Armstrong
- Skin Game (1971) - Mr. Calloway
- Bone (1972) - Bill
- Black Caesar (1973) - Man at Shoeshine (uncredited)
- It's Alive (1974) - The Professor
- The Bears and I (1974) - Commissioner Gaines
- The Missiles of October (1974) - Gen. Maxwell Taylor, Army Chief of Staff
- Tail Gunner Joe (1977) - Dwight D. Eisenhower
- The Deadliest Season (1977) - Al Miller
- Pine Canyon Is Burning (1977) - Capt. Ed Wilson
- The Private Files of J. Edgar Hoover (1977) - Lyndon B. Johnson
- It Lives Again (1978) - Dr. Perry
- A Fire in the Sky (1978) - President
- The Incredible Journey of Doctor Meg Laurel (1979) - Judge Adamson
- Frankenstein Island (1981) - The Colonel
- Doctor Detroit (1983) - Harmon Rousehorn
- A Return to Salem's Lot (1987) - Judge Axel (final film role)

=== Television ===
- Gunsmoke (1956 episode: "How To Cure A Friend") - Nick Search (S2E8)
- Cheyenne (1956 episode: "The Bounty Killers") as Marshall Frank Moxon, (1957 episode: "Land Beyond the Law") as Major Ellwood, (1958 episode: "The Angry Sky") as Granger Ward (Black Jack), (1961 episode: "The Frightened Town") as Marshal Delaney, and (1963 in the series finale "Showdown at Oxbend") as Ed Foster.
- Wagon Train (1957 first episode)
- Gunsmoke (1957 episode: "Cheap Labor") - Fos Capper (S2E32)
- Decision (1958 episode: "The Virginian") - Ben Stocker (S1E1)
- Maverick (1961 episode: "The Ice Man") - Calvin Powers
- Bonanza (1964 episode: "The Lila Conrad Story") - Judge David Knowlton
- Alfred Hitchcock Hour (1964 episode: "The McGregor Affair") - McGregor
- The Big Valley 2 episodes: "Forty Rifles" as Wallant and "The Haunted Gun" as Senator Jud Robson
- 12 O'Clock High (series 2/3, Major General Ed Britt)
- The Fugitive (1966 episode: "Shadow of the Swan") - Harry Anderson
- Gunsmoke (1965 episode: "Gilt Guilt") - Crail (S10E31)
- The F.B.I. (1967 episode: "A Question of Guilt") - Lt. Harris
- The Invaders (1967 episode: "Doomsday Minus One") - General Theodore Beaumont
- Lancer (1968–1970) Murdoch Lancer
- Hawaii Five-O (1968 Episode: "The Cocoon")
- The Homecoming: A Christmas Story (1971 TV movie) - John Walton Sr.
- Mission: Impossible (1971 episode: "A Ghost Story") - Justin Bainbridge
- Mannix (1971 episode: "The Man Outside") - General Alec Holt
- Cannon (1972 episode: "The Endangered Species") as Bill Coates, (1976 episode: "The Quasar Kill") as Dr. Lawrence
- McMillan and Wife (1972 episode: "Terror Times Two") - Frank Carstairs
- Hawaii Five-O (1973 episode "Death With Father") - Cliff Morgan
- Kung Fu (1973 episode: “The Tide”)
- The Streets of San Francisco (1974 episode: "Target: Red")
- Hawaii Five-O (1978 episode: "The Sleeper", 1979 episode: "Use a Gun, Go to Hell")
- Wonder Woman (1979 episode: "The Starships Are Coming") - Mason Steele
- Backstairs at the White House (1979 TV miniseries) - President Dwight D. Eisenhower
- M*A*S*H (1980 episode: "Father's Day") - Margaret Houlihan's father Col. Alvin 'Howitzer Al' Houlihan
- Hart to Hart (1983 episode: "Bahama Bound Harts") - Loring Nichols
- Falcon Crest (1984 episode: "The Outcasts") - Paul Hartford
- Highway To Heaven (1985 episode: "An Investment in Caring") - Crawford
- Remington Steele (1986 episode: "Steele Blue Yonder") - Johnny Cooper
