= Warner Bros. Television Studios =

Television arm of Warner Bros.

- Logo used since 2023

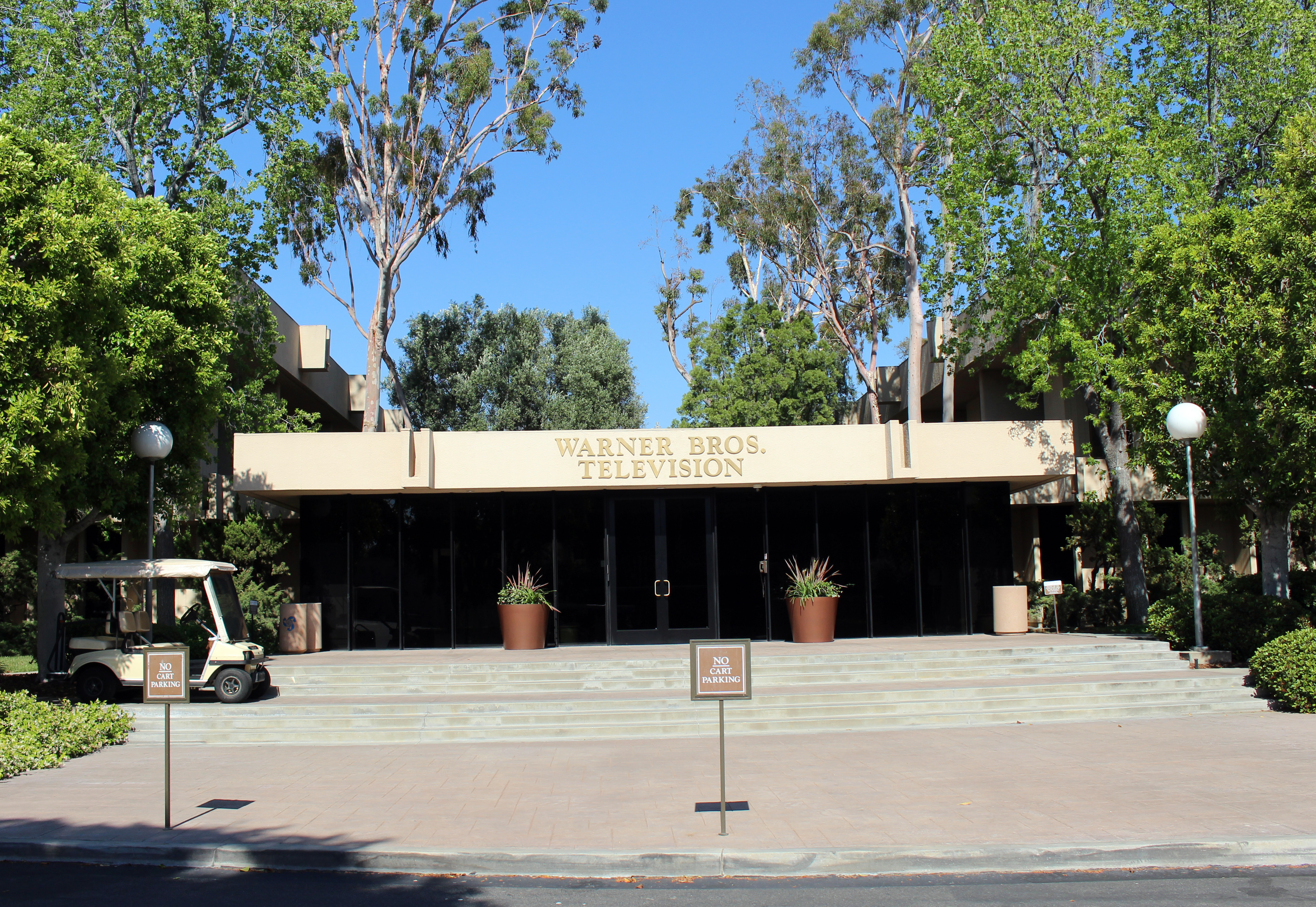
- Warner Bros. Television headquarters at the Warner Bros. studio lot
- Trade name: Warner Bros. Television
- Formerly: Warner Bros. Television Division (1955–1967); Warner Bros. Television (1955–1967; 1970–2020); Warner Bros.-Seven Arts Television (1967–1970)
- Type: Division
- Industry: Television
- Predecessor: Lorimar Television (1969–1993); Warner Horizon Scripted Television (2006–2020) Paramount Television Studios (2013–2026)
- Founded: March 21, 1955; 71 years ago
- Founder: William T. Orr
- Headquarters: 4000 Warner Boulevard, Burbank, California, United States
- Area served: Worldwide
- Key people: George Cheeks (co-chair & Chief Content Officer, Skydance TV); Channing Dungey (Chair of Warner Bros. Television Group and Skydance Global Cable Media); Brett A. Paul (president)
- Products: Television programs
- Brands: DC; Friends; Full House; The Big Bang Theory; The Dukes of Hazzard; Game of Thrones; Gilmore Girls; The West Wing
- Services: Television production; Television distribution
- Revenue: ▲US$5.62 billion (2015)
- Operating income: ▲US$344 million (2015)
- Parent: Skydance Television Studios Group
- Divisions: Warner Horizon Scripted Television; Warner Horizon Unscripted Television; Warner Bros. Domestic Television Distribution
- Subsidiaries: Alloy Entertainment; BET Studios; Nickelodeon Productions; Skydance Global Content Sales; Paramount Television International Studios; Telepictures; Shed Media
- Website: warnerbros.com/tv

Warner Bros. Television Studios, operating under the name Warner Bros. Television (abbreviated as WBTV; formerly known as Warner Bros. Television Division), is an American television production and distribution studio of Skydance Television Studios Group. Launched on March 21, 1955, by William T. Orr, it produces scripted series for all streamers and networks and cable networks. As of 2015, it is one of the world's two largest television production companies measured by revenue and library along with Sony Pictures Television.

== History ==
=== Beginning and saturation ===
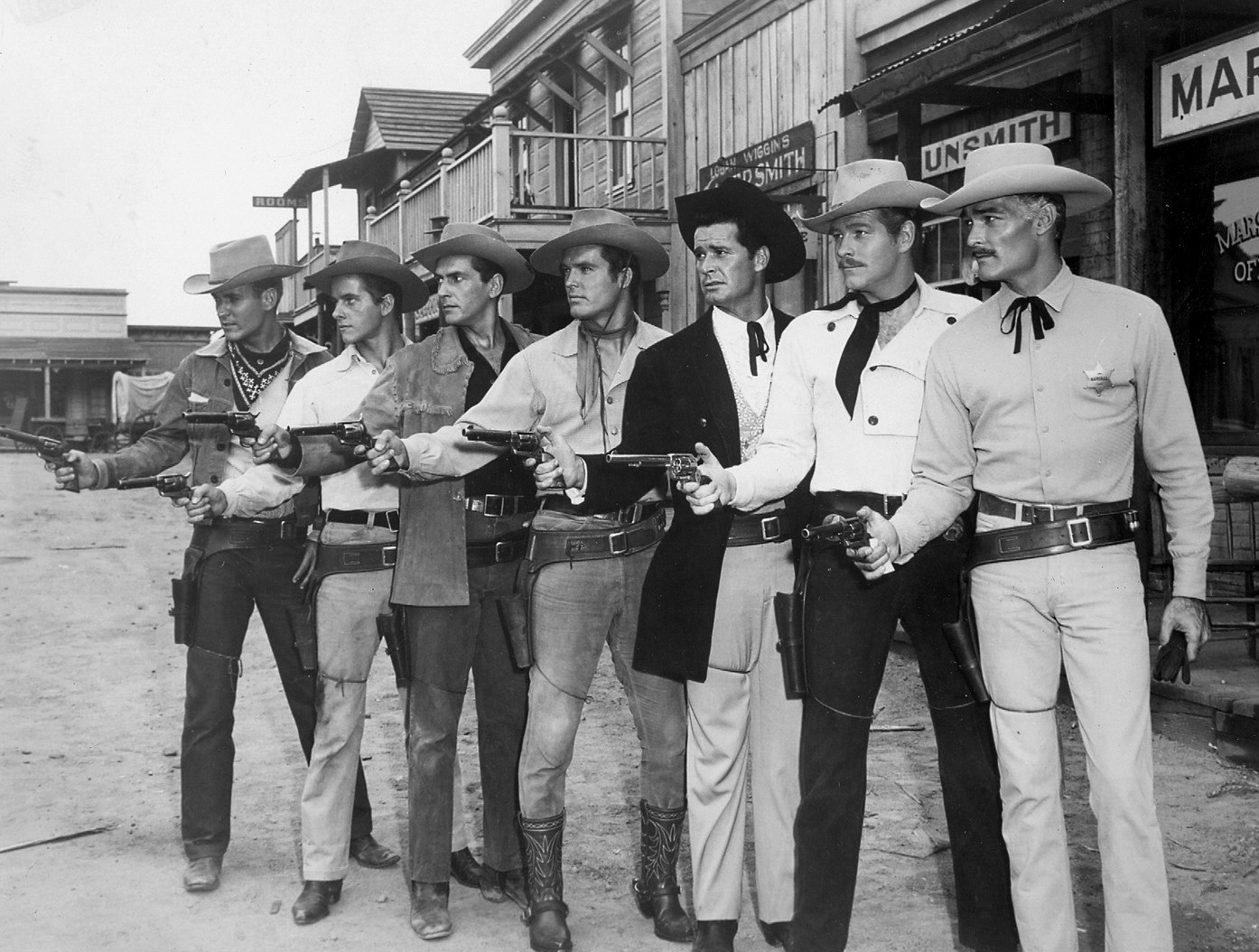
Publicity still with 1959 Warner Bros. Western series leads Will Hutchins (Sugarfoot), Peter Brown (Lawman), Jack Kelly (Maverick), Ty Hardin (Bronco), James Garner (Maverick), Wayde Preston (Colt .45), and John Russell (Lawman)

The end of World War II led to the rise of television in the late 1940s and early 1950s which saw the eclipse of the Hollywood film studio system, upon the rise of television programming in the wake of the war, many of the film studio executives were in doubt, as they saw the rise of television destroying their film studio business, one of the first major American film studios to move into television was Columbia Pictures in 1947, soon other Hollywood studios such as Paramount Pictures, and Walt Disney Studios started following suit capitalising on the rise of television.

Warner Bros. originally planned to move into television back in 1949 as requested by the other Warners, but Jack L. Warner declined and turned down many proposals as he refused to give into the capitalization of TV thus the path to TV was slow, eventually the executives finally gave in and started establishing their television division.

The division was started on March 21, 1955, with its first head being Jack L. Warner's son-in-law William T. Orr. ABC had approached Warner Bros. initially with the idea of purchasing the studio's film library (Warner Bros. eventually sold the rights to the negatives of pre-1950 films and pre-1948 cartoons and shorts to Associated Artists Productions, or a.a.p., in 1956). Warner Bros. formally entered television production with the premiere of its self-titled anthology series Warner Bros. Presents on ABC. The one-hour weekly show featured rotating episodes of television series based on the Warner Bros. films Casablanca and Kings Row, as well as an original series titled Cheyenne with Clint Walker. The first one-hour television western, Cheyenne became a big hit for the network and the studio with the added advantage of featuring promotions for upcoming Warner Bros. cinema releases in the show's last ten minutes. One such segment for Rebel Without a Cause featured Gig Young notably talking about road safety with James Dean.

With only Cheyenne being a success, Warner Bros. ended the ten-minute promotions of new films and replaced Warner Bros. Presents with an anthology series titled Conflict. It was felt that "Conflict" was what the previous series lacked. Conflict showed the pilots for Maverick and 77 Sunset Strip.

The success of Cheyenne led Warner Bros. Television to produce many series for ABC such as Westerns (Maverick, Lawman, Colt .45, Bronco, a spin off of Cheyenne, Sugarfoot, and The Alaskans), crime dramas (77 Sunset Strip, Hawaiian Eye, Bourbon Street Beat, and Surfside 6), and other shows such as The Gallant Men and The Roaring Twenties using stock footage from Warner Bros. war films and gangster films respectively. Warner Bros. Television also produced Jack Webb's Red Nightmare starring Jack Kelly for the U.S. Department of Defense that was later shown on American television on Jack Webb's General Electric True.

All shows were made in the manner of WB's B pictures in the 1930s and 1940s; fast-paced, much stock footage from other films, stock music from the Warner Bros. music library and contracted stars working long hours for comparatively small salaries with restrictions on their career.

During the 1960 Writers Guild of America strike, Warner Bros. reused many plots from its films and other television shows under the nom de plume of "W. Hermanos". This was another example of imitating Warner Bros.' B pictures who would remake an "A" film and switch the setting.

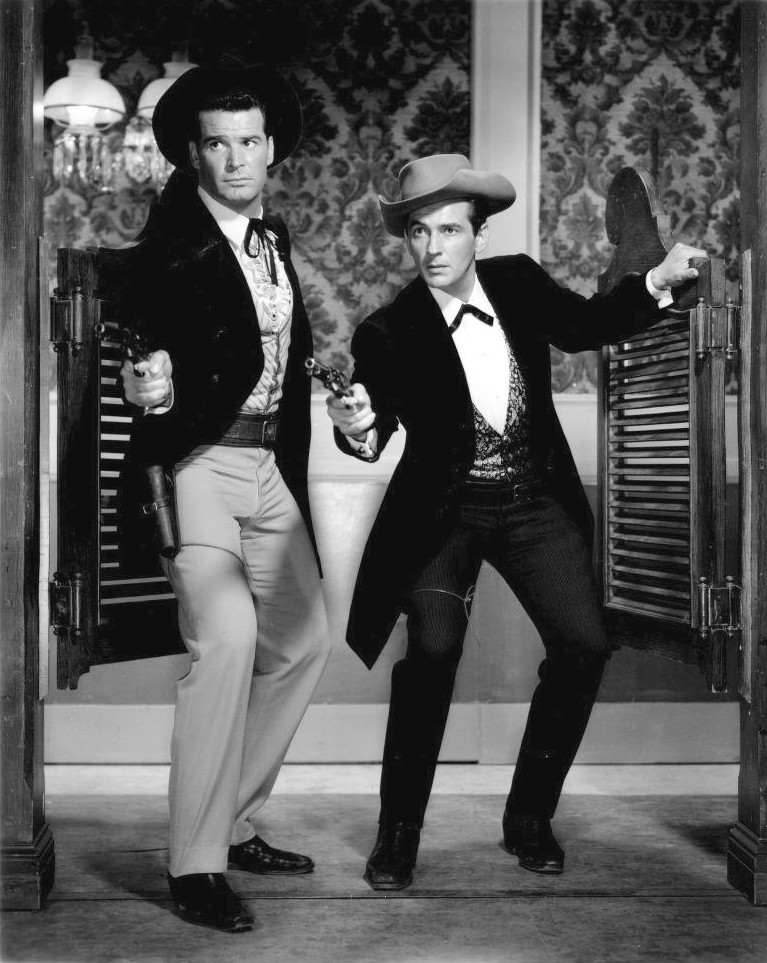
James Garner and Jack Kelly as Bret and Bart Maverick in Maverick, 1959

Two of the most popular stars, James Garner and Clint Walker, quit over their conditions. Garner never returned to the Warners fold during this period, instead moving forward into a major theatrical film career. Successful Warner Bros. television stars found themselves in leading roles of many of the studio's theatrical films with no increase in salary. Efrem Zimbalist Jr. was simultaneously the lead of 77 Sunset Strip briefly overlapping with a recurring role as "Dandy Jim Buckley" on Maverick, and also headlined several films until exhaustion forced the studio to give him a rest. Many other actors under contract to Warner Bros. at the time, who despite their work conditions, did see their stars rise over time, albeit for most only briefly, included Jack Kelly, Will Hutchins, Peter Brown, Ty Hardin, Wayde Preston, John Russell, Donald May, Rex Reason, Richard Long, Van Williams, Roger Smith, Mike Road, Anthony Eisley, Robert Conrad, Robert McQueeney, Dorothy Provine, Diane McBain and Connie Stevens. Edd Byrnes and Troy Donahue would become teen heartthrobs. Another contract player, Englishman Roger Moore (Maverick and The Alaskans), was growing displeased with Warner as his contract was expiring and would relocate to Europe from Hollywood, becoming an international star on television, and eventually, in theatrical films, playing James Bond among other roles. Warner Bros. also contracted established stars such as Ray Danton, Peter Breck, Jeanne Cooper and Grant Williams. These stars often appeared as guest stars, sometimes reprising their series role in another TV series.

The stars appeared in Warner Bros. cinema releases with no additional salary, with some such as Zimbalist, Walker, Garner (replacing Charlton Heston in Darby's Rangers), and Danton (replacing Robert Evans in The Rise and Fall of Legs Diamond) playing the lead roles; many of the stars appeared in ensemble casts in such films as The Chapman Report and Merill's Marauders. Some stars such as Connie Stevens, Edd Byrnes, Robert Conrad and Roger Smith made albums for Warner Bros. Records. One particular recording, a novelty tune titled Kookie, Kookie (Lend Me Your Comb) became a big hit for Edd Byrnes and Connie Stevens (1959). The following year, Connie Stevens had her own hit, with Sixteen Reasons.

It was during this period that series, particularly Westerns like Cheyenne and Maverick, and the crime dramas like 77 Sunset Strip, Hawaiian Eye and Surfside 6 featured catchy theme songs that became just as much a part of the American pop culture landscape as the shows themselves. Depending on the particular series (in this case, the Westerns), William Lava or David Buttolph would compose the music, with lyrics by Stan Jones or Paul Francis Webster, among others. For the crime shows, it was up to the songwriting team of Jerry Livingston and Mack David, who also scored the themes for the sitcom Room for One More, and The Bugs Bunny Show.

In 1960, Warner Bros. Television turned its attentions to younger audiences as they brought Bugs Bunny and the other Warner Bros. cartoon characters to prime time, with The Bugs Bunny Show, which featured cartoons released after July 31, 1948 (which had not been sold to Associated Artists Productions), combined with newly animated introductory material. Also, that year saw the debut of The Roaring Twenties, which was thought to be a more benign alternative to Desilu's The Untouchables. Whether or not that was actually the case, it was, in fact, much less successful.

Warner Bros. Television expanded on its existing genre of Westerns and crime dramas, and in January 1962, produced its first sitcom, Room For One More. Based on the memoirs of Anna Rose, which in 1952 Warner Bros made into a movie starring Cary Grant and his then-wife Betsy Drake (the only movie that they worked together in) about a married couple with two children of their own who went on to adopt at least two more. The TV series starred Andrew Duggan and Peggy McCay as George and Anna Rose. Acting legend Mickey Rooney's son Tim, and Ahna Capri, who would continue to do episodic TV roles and feature films (arguably, her best-known movie was Enter the Dragon starring Bruce Lee) were cast as the Rose's natural children. The show only lasted for half a season. In the fall of that year, a WWII drama The Gallant Men debuted, but lasted for only one season.

Warner Bros. Television exclusively produced shows for the ABC network until 1962, when GE True premiered on CBS.

In 1964, Warner Bros. Television once again tried to turn a classic film comedy of its own into a sitcom, with No Time for Sergeants. Both the sitcom and the 1958 movie were based on the 1955 Broadway play, which starred Andy Griffith (TV's The United States Steel Hour also adapted the stage play for TV in 1956). The sitcom starred Sammy Jackson as Will Stockdale, a naive Georgia farm boy drafted into the military. 1965 saw the debut of F Troop, a Western spoof taking place at a U.S. Army post after the Civil War. Despite lasting only two seasons, it is still considered a classic of its type. Forrest Tucker, Larry Storch, and Ken Berry led an ensemble cast featuring military misfits, and an Indian tribe, who, among other things, forgot how to do a rain dance.

The streak of identifiable series subsided in 1963 with a halt of using stock company contract players and Jack Webb taking over WBTV and not being particularly successful. However, many series were still filmed at Warner Bros. such as F Troop and The F.B.I.

=== From 1967 to 2000 ===
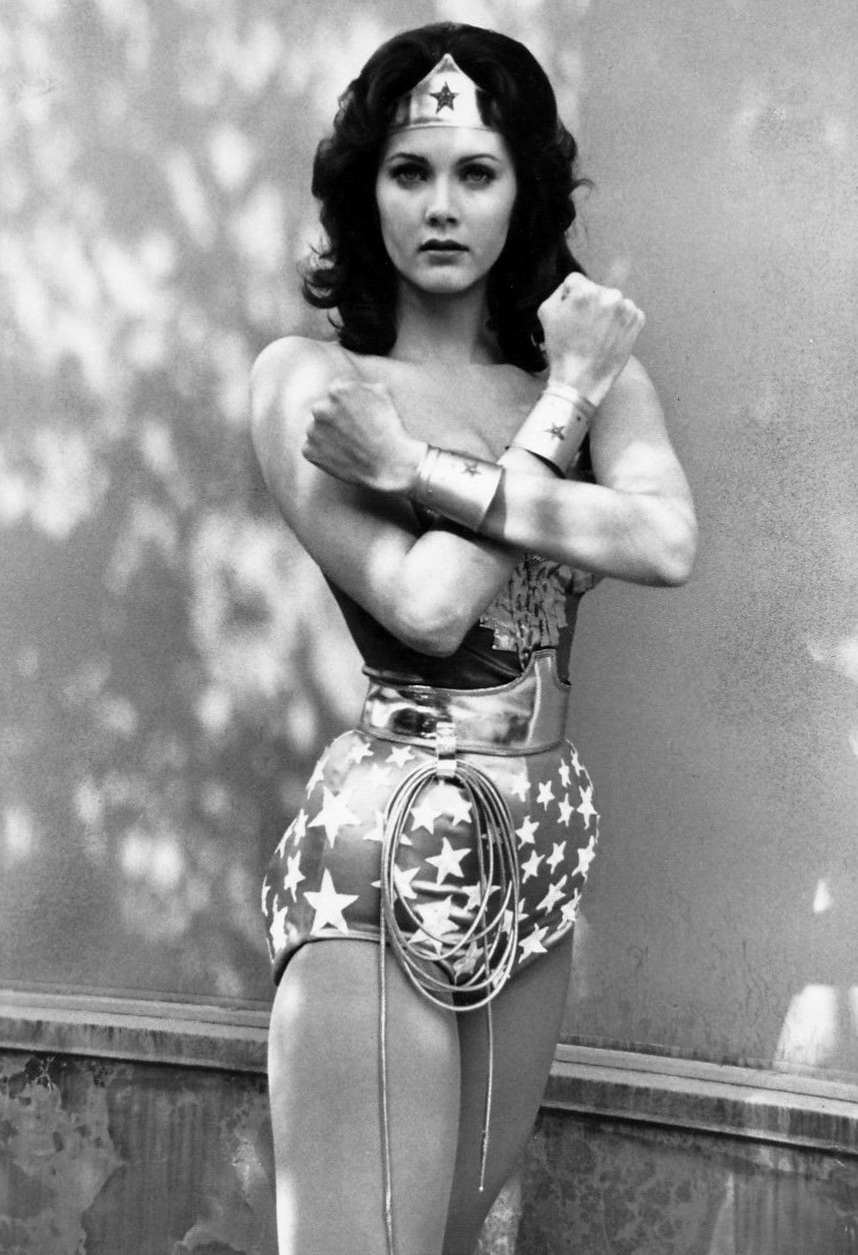
Wonder Woman (Lynda Carter) in the 1975–1979 television series, Wonder Woman

For four years, from 1967 to 1971, Warner Bros. Television's sole output was the existing television series The F.B.I.. By 1970, several former personnel from 20th Century-Fox Television, as well as former agent-writers, had moved to Warner Bros., including Paul Monash, Rod Amateau, Bill Idelson and Harvey Miller, Saul Turteltaub and Bernie Orenstein, Jerry Gardner and Dee Caruso, and Hal Kanter and A. J. Carothers. By 1971, Warner Bros. Television had returned to prime-time production after producing only one show for four years. Among its first shows upon returning were the NBC series Nichols and The Jimmy Stewart Show and the CBS series The Chicago Teddy Bears. That same year, animation studio Filmation and Warner Bros. entered into a deal to produce cartoons for film and television, with Warner Bros. Television holding global distribution rights.

In 1975, the stars of Lynda Carter, Warner Bros. and National Comics Publications produced the television series Wonder Woman. National Comics Publications was purchased by Kinney National Company in 1967 and remained the part of the company until Kinney bought Warner Bros. in 1969. Also that year, Warner Bros. Television secured a deal with Bill Carruthers and his production company to develop its game shows and other videotaped programming.

In 1976, Warner Bros. Television acquired The Wolper Organization, producer of Chico and the Man and Welcome Back, Kotter. In 1978, Stan Margulies, who produced Roots, signed a three-year exclusive contract with the studio. The following week, Warner had acquired contracts with big names like James Komack, Danny Arnold, the trio of Don Nicholl, Michael Ross and Bernie West (NRW) and the duo of Alan Blye and Bob Einstein to distribute programs worldwide.

In 1979, Warner Bros. Television produced the television series The Dukes of Hazzard.

In 1980, Phillip Saltzman and his Woodruff Productions company signed a deal with the studio.

In 1982, Aaron Spelling and his production company had struck a deal with the studio to distribute the shows. The pact would continue until 1988.

On June 1, 1986, Alan Shayne has left as president of the studio after 10 years, to start out a new production company, Alan Shayne Productions, which will be affiliated in association with the studio, in order to develop four made-for-TV movies and miniseries projects, which was developed for the 1987–1988 season.

Prior to the merge with Time Inc., Warner Communications acquired Lorimar-Telepictures. The acquisition completed on January 12, 1989. Lorimar Television folded into Warner Bros. Television in July 1993. Telepictures later became a television production company.

In 1992, Witt/Thomas Productions signed a television contract with Warner Bros. after the previous contract with Disney was not renewed. In 1993, two Time Warner-affiliated production companies Quincy Jones Entertainment and David Salzman Entertainment had merged their companies to form Quincy Jones-David Salzman Entertainment, which was affiliated with Warner Bros. and Time Warner. Not too long after that, Lorimar Television was folded into WBTV, taking some key members with them. In 1993, Tom Arnold and Roseanne Barr via Wapello County Productions struck a deal with the studio. Later that year, Warner Bros. Television partnered with Bud Grant Productions, a company led by CBS executive Bud Grant, and formerly of Grant/Tribune Productions for a two-year, non-exclusive deal.

In 1994, writers-producers of Friends, Kevin Bright, Martha Kauffman and David Crane, and associated with the studio since 1992 had struck its exclusive deal with the studio. In 1996, Warner Bros. Television collaborated with Universal Television to develop the series Spy Game for ABC, with Universal alumnus Sam Raimi and Robert Tapert of Renaissance Pictures, and Warner alumnus John McNamara producing the series, but it did not last long, as it only lasted one season on the air.

=== From 2001 ===
In 2001, Warner Bros. Television fully took over distribution of Hanna-Barbera related properties produced by Warner Bros. Animation such as Scooby-Doo, producing a steady stream of Scooby-Doo direct-to-video films and two new series, What's New, Scooby-Doo? (2002–2006) and Shaggy & Scooby-Doo Get a Clue! (2006–2008). In 2006, Warner Bros. Television made some of its vast library of programs available for free viewing on the Internet (through sister company AOL's In2TV service), with Welcome Back, Kotter as its marquee offering. Some of these programs have not been seen publicly since their last syndicated release in the 1980s.

Alternate logo of WBTV without banner, used for corporate purposes

On June 11, 2012, Warner Bros. Television acquired Alloy Entertainment. On June 2, 2014, Warner Bros. Television Group purchased all of Eyeworks' companies outside of the United States, rebranding as Warner Bros. International Television Production. Eyeworks USA however, will remain independent.

In 2020, Warner Bros. Television was renamed Warner Bros. Television Studios as part of WarnerMedia's restructuring of its television divisions. The Warner Bros. Television name continues to be used on-screen, as well as the company's trade name.

On November 30, 2022, Warner Bros Television head Channing Dungey announced that they were in talks with Amazon to make animated DC content for its streaming service Amazon Prime Video. One of these projects was Batman: Caped Crusader, which premiered in 2024. It was followed by the Bat-Fam in 2025.

In October 2026, when Warner Bros. Television Studios' parent Warner Bros. Discovery had merged with Paramount Skydance to become Skydance, Warner Bros. Television Studios had moved from Warner Bros. Entertainment to Skydance's newly established television production group division Skydance Television Studios Group as Warner Bros. Television Studios had become a production subsidiary of the newly formed Skydance Television Studios Group. On November 18, 2026, it was announced that Warner Bros. Television Group and Paramount Television Studios would both combine to Warner Bros. Television Studios, beginning in early 2027.

== Divisions ==
In addition to the main Warner Bros. Television Studios label, the company also owns and operates the following production companies in the United States:

=== Current ===
==== Warner Horizon Unscripted Television ====
Warner Horizon Unscripted Television
- Logo used since 2023
- Formerly: Warner Horizon Television
- Type: Division
- Founded: April 2006; 20 years ago
- Area served: Worldwide
- Key people: Channing Dungey (chairman, Warner Bros. Television Group); Brett A. Paul (president)
- Owner: Skydance Corporation
- Parent: WBTVS Unscripted Production
- Website: www.warnerbros.com/tv

Warner Horizon Unscripted Television is Warner Bros. Television Studios' alternative television, cable and streaming production unit; founded in April 2006, it originally operated as a singular label encompassing both scripted and unscripted productions. Notable series and films produced by the Warner Horizon units include The Bachelor dating show franchise, The Voice, Pretty Little Liars (and spin-offs Ravenswood and Pretty Little Liars: The Perfectionists), Ellen's Game of Games, Fuller House, The Masked Dancer, Whose Line Is It Anyway?, You and the first season of Pennyworth.

On August 10, 2020, Warner Bros. Television Group separated the Warner Horizon label into two standalone companies maintaining individualized production focuses:

- Warner Horizon Scripted Television—which combined its operations with those of Warner Bros. Television through the Warner Horizon split-up—focuses on production of scripted comedic and dramatic programs for cable networks and subscription-based streaming platforms.
- Warner Horizon Unscripted Television—which was folded into Warner Bros. Unscripted & Alternative Television under the realignment—focuses on production of reality television programs, documentaries and other alternative programming formats for broadcast and cable networks, and subscription-based streaming platforms.

==== Alloy Entertainment ====
Alloy Entertainment is a book packaging and production company under Warner Bros. Television Studios. Notable series and films produced by Alloy include The Sisterhood of the Traveling Pants, Gossip Girl, The Vampire Diaries, Pretty Little Liars, The 100, The Sun Is Also a Star, Everything, Everything, and You.

==== Shed Media ====
Shed Media (formerly known as Shed Media US) is an American production company and a division of Warner Bros. Unscripted & Alternative Television, founded in February 2009. Series produced by Shed Media include Who Do You Think You Are? for NBC, Criminal Confessions and Murder for Hire for Oxygen, Huda Boss for Facebook Watch, Supernanny for Lifetime, and The Real Housewives of New York City for Bravo.

==== Telepictures ====
Telepictures is an American production company. It was bought by Warner Communications in 1988 and remains a subsidiary of Warner Bros. Television Studios to this day. Programs produced by Telepictures include The Ellen DeGeneres Show, as well as Extra, Judge Mathis, The People's Court, The Real, in addition to the NBC primetime series Ellen's Game of Games and Ellen's Greatest Night of Giveaways (both produced in association with Warner Horizon Unscripted Television). Telepictures is also producing the upcoming Elizabeth Smart-led series Smart Justice for Lifetime and the new HBO Max competition series Ellen's Next Great Designer. Telepictures also formerly produced TMZ on TV, which it sold to Fox Entertainment in 2021.

=== Former ===
==== Cartoon Network Studios ====
Cartoon Network Studios is an American production company and the main animation studio for Cartoon Network and its associated channels. It started operating in 1994 as a division of Hanna-Barbera until 2001 when the latter absorbed into Warner Bros. Animation. Located in Burbank, California, the studio primarily produces and develops animated programs and shorts for Cartoon Network, Adult Swim, Cartoonito and HBO Max. The company has only produced one theatrically released film, The Powerpuff Girls Movie, distributed by its sister company, Warner Bros. Pictures; its commercial failure prompted the company to stop theatrical releases of its films, though Regular Show: The Movie was released to theaters at a limited capacity. The studio also produces live-action series for Adult Swim and formerly Cartoon Network under various pseudonyms.

==== Hanna-Barbera Studios Europe ====
Hanna-Barbera Studios Europe is a British animation studio headquartered in London, England. The studio was founded on 18 September 2007 as an EMEA sister studio of Cartoon Network Studios. On 7 April 2021, WarnerMedia announced it had rebranded the studio to Hanna-Barbera Studios Europe, in honor of the original Hollywood-based studio and its co-founders William Hanna and Joseph Barbera. . The first projects greenlit under the studio's new name were a film and a new series based on The Amazing World of Gumball, the latter of which ultimately became the seventh season of the original show and was titled The Wonderfully Weird World of Gumball.

==== Warner Bros. Animation ====
Warner Bros. Animation Inc. is an American animation studio closely associated with the Looney Tunes and Merrie Melodies characters, among others. The studio is the successor to Warner Bros. Cartoons, the studio which produced Looney Tunes and Merrie Melodies cartoon shorts from 1933 to 1963, and from 1967 to 1969. Warner reestablished its animation division in 1980 to produce Looney Tunes–related works, and Turner Broadcasting System (who bought MGM/UA which owned pre-1950 Looney Tunes/Merrie Melodies shorts) merged with Time Warner (later called WarnerMedia; and Warner Bros. Discovery following WarnerMedia's merger with Discovery, Inc., the latter that bought Scripps Networks Interactive) in 1996. It replaces Warner Bros. Cartoons and Warner Bros. Feature Animation; since March 2001, it also replaces Hanna-Barbera as well.

In recent years, Warner Bros. Animation has focused primarily on producing television and direct-to-video animation featuring characters of Looney Tunes, Tom and Jerry, and Scooby-Doo created by other properties owned by Warner Bros., including MGM cartoon studio (via Turner Entertainment Co.) and Hanna-Barbera Productions.

==== Warner Bros. Kids, Young Adults and Classics ====
Logo used from 2020 to 2022.

Warner Bros. Kids, Young Adults and Classics (KYAC; often known as Warner Bros. Global Kids, Young Adults and Classics), formerly known as Warner Bros. Global Kids and Young Adults, was a division of Warner Bros. established on March 4, 2019, as part of a major reorganization of its former parent company, WarnerMedia. It existed until May 11, 2022.

On March 4, 2019, AT&T announced a major reorganization of WarnerMedia to effectively dissolve the Turner Broadcasting System division, which involved Cartoon Network, Boomerang, Adult Swim, Turner Classic Movies, its related production studios and international networks and digital media company Otter Media being transferred to Warner Bros. Entertainment. Aside from TCM and Otter – which was transferred over to WarnerMedia Entertainment on May 31, 2019, to oversee development on a then-upcoming over-the-top streaming service (which was later given the name HBO Max) from WarnerMedia – the newly transferred properties came under a newly formed Global Kids & Young Adults division.

The division was responsible for overseeing the parent company's family, kids, animation and young adult properties, its properties include the former Turner Broadcasting System cable television networks Cartoon Network (including the programming blocks Adult Swim, Toonami, Cartoonito and ACME Night), Boomerang, and Turner Classic Movies; and the animation studios Warner Bros. Animation, Cartoon Network Studios and Williams Street.

On April 7, 2020, Tom Ascheim was named president of the division, now renamed Warner Bros. Global Kids, Young Adults and Classics, overseeing Cartoon Network, Boomerang and Adult Swim, and adding Turner Classic Movies to his oversight.

On May 11, 2022, Tom Ascheim exited as President of KYAC due to Warner Bros. Discovery's leadership restructuring the organization and eliminating his role. The studios were moved under Warner Bros. Television while Kathleen Finch's U.S. Networks Group assumed oversight over the linear networks, effectively dissolving the unit.

==== Blue Ribbon Content ====
Formed in 2014, Blue Ribbon Content (BRC) was Warner Bros. Television Studios' digital series production unit. The company takes its name from the "Blue Ribbon" reissues of Merrie Melodies and Looney Tunes animation shorts. The company was quietly closed in 2020.

Live-action BRC productions include series such as the horror-comedy Critters: A New Binge for Shudder, comedy Play It Again, Dick and horror-comedy The Pledge for CW Seed, as well as the following original films: The Banana Splits Movie and Critters Attack! for Warner Bros. Home Entertainment and Syfy, plus Good Girls Get High for AT&T's DirectTV Cinema. BRC also produces the animated series Deathstroke: Knights & Dragons for CW Seed.

== Warner Bros. Domestic Television Distribution ==
Warner Bros. Domestic Television Distribution
- Logo used since 2023
- Formerly: Warner Bros. Television Division (1961–1967); Warner Bros. Seven Arts Television (1967–1969); Warner Bros. Television Distribution (1970–1989)
- Type: Label
- Industry: Television distribution Broadcast syndication
- Predecessor: Seven Arts Associated Corp. (1960–1967); Lorimar-Telepictures (1986–1989)
- Founded: 1961; 65 years ago in Burbank, California
- Area served: Worldwide
- Owner: Skydance Corporation
- Parent: Warner Bros. Television Studios

Warner Bros. Domestic Television Distribution (formerly Warner Bros. Television Distribution) is the television distribution and broadcast syndication arm of Warner Bros. Television Studios.

Established in 1961, the arm was originally known as Warner Bros. Television Division before taking on its current name in 1989 with the acquisition of Lorimar-Telepictures. In 1991, Keith Samples, who was employee of the studio left Warner Bros., of which the employment staff inherited from Lorimar, who had joined it in 1985, to start out a TV syndication company Rysher Entertainment.

In 1999, it reached a deal with NBC Enterprises to pick up the off-net syndication rights to the sitcom Will & Grace.

== International operations ==
=== Australia ===
Warner Bros. International Television Production Australia (WBITPA) was founded in 2004 as Eyeworks Australia before being rebranded in 2014.

As Eyeworks Australia, shows produced include Celebrity Splash, Being Lara Bingle, Gangs of Oz and Territory Cops. Following the rebrand, WBITPA began producing The Bachelor Australia from its fourth season, spin-offs The Bachelorette Australia from its second season & Bachelor in Paradise, as well as First Dates, the eighth season of Who Do You Think You Are?, the sixteenth season of Dancing with the Stars and The Masked Singer Australia.

=== New Zealand ===
WBITVP New Zealand produces some of New Zealand's most successful entertainment shows including RuPaul's Drag Race Down Under, The Bachelor NZ, The Bachelorette NZ, The Block NZ, Celebrity Treasure Island, Glow Up, House of Drag and The Great Kiwi Bake Off.

=== Spain ===
The Spanish subsidiary was acquired as part of the Eyeworks takeover in 2014. Eyeworks España was renamed Warner Bros. International Television Production España in December 2015.

Shows produced by Warner Bros. International Television Production España include Juego de juegos, based on Ellen's Game of Games; First Dates, based on the British show of the same name; Pesadilla en la cocina, based on Ramsay's Kitchen Nightmares; ¿Quién quiere ser millonario?, based on the British Who Wants to Be a Millionaire?; and Ven a cenar conmigo, based on the British Come Dine with Me. Along with Mediaset España and Netflix, the company also co-produced Brigada Costa del Sol.

=== United Kingdom ===
Warner Bros. Television Studios UK

Shed Productions was established in 1998, was acquired by Time Warner in 2010, and later was rebranded as Warner Bros. Television Productions UK in 2015.

== Filmography ==
Notable shows produced and distributed by Warner Bros. Television include Wonder Woman, The Dukes of Hazzard, The Big Bang Theory, Young Sheldon, Two and a Half Men, Friends, The Middle, Ted Lasso, The Pitt, Abbott Elementary, Gilmore Girls, Shameless, The O.C., ER, and many others.
