= Tim Rooney =

American actor

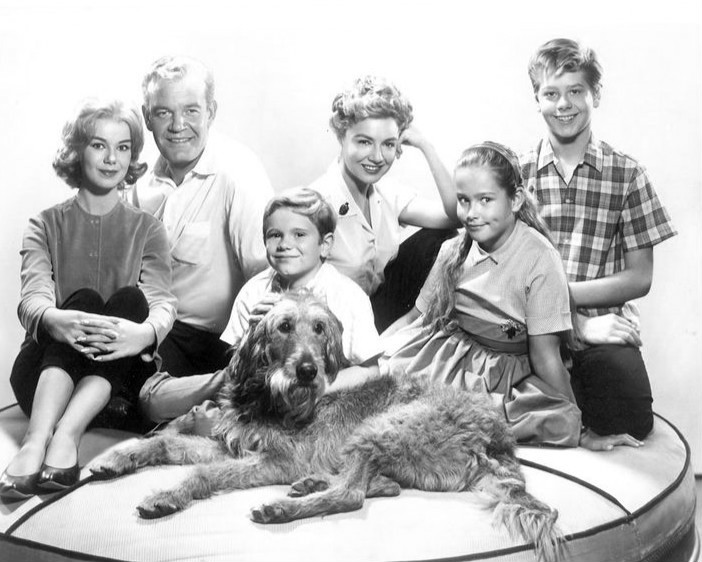
- Back, L-R: Ahna Capri, Andrew Duggan, Peggy McCay, Tim Rooney. Front: Ronnie Dapo, Carol Nicholson and "Tramp", from the TV series Room for One More (1962)
- Born: Timothy Hayes Yule; January 4, 1947; Birmingham, Alabama, U.S.
- Died: September 23, 2006 (aged 59); Hemet, California, U.S.
- Occupation: Actor
- Years active: 1955–1983
- Parent(s): Mickey Rooney; B. J. Baker
- Relatives: Mickey Rooney Jr. (brother); Michael Rooney (half-brother)

Timothy Hayes Yule (January 4, 1947 – September 23, 2006), better known as Tim Rooney, was an American actor. Rooney was the second son of actor and comedian Mickey Rooney. Later in his life, Rooney developed a rare muscle disease known as dermatomyositis.

== Early life ==
Tim Rooney was born on January 4, 1947, in Birmingham, Alabama. His mother was a former Miss Alabama and singer, Betty Jane Rase, who performed as B. J. Baker.

He had childhood polio that left him paralyzed for two years, but later recovered.

== Career ==
Rooney's notable appearances included the films Village of the Giants and Riot on Sunset Strip, and also the TV series The Donald O'Connor Show, Maverick, Dr. Kildare, Gidget, Bewitched, Dragnet and the cartoon show Mister T, in voiceovers.

In 1962 he co-starred as Jeff Rose, one of two adopted children, in the ABC comedy Room for One More. In 1964–1965, Tim co-starred as Timmy Grady, the son of Mickey Grady, played by his real-life father Mickey Rooney, in Mickey.

== Death ==
Tim Rooney died at his ranch in Hemet, California, on September 23, 2006, at the age of 59, five years after being diagnosed with dermatomyositis, a muscle disease.
