= Maxine Stuart =

American actress (1918-2013)

- Born: Maxine Shlivek; June 28, 1918; Deal, New Jersey, U.S.
- Died: June 6, 2013 (aged 94); Beverly Hills, California, U.S.
- Occupation: Actress
- Years active: 1937–2003
- Spouse(s): Alfred Gordon (1941–?) (divorced); Frank Maxwell (1949–1963) (divorced) (1 child); David Shaw (1974–2007) (his death) (2 children)
- Children: 3

Maxine Stuart (June 28, 1918 – June 6, 2013) was an American actress.

== Biography ==
Stuart was born in Deal, New Jersey as Maxine Shlivek, and raised in Manhattan and Lawrence, Nassau County, New York.

Stuart was a life member of The Actors Studio. Her Broadway credits include At War With the Army (1949), A Goose for the Gander (1945), Nine Girls (1943), Ring Two (1939), Sunup to Sundown (1938), and Western Waters (1937).

On television, she portrayed B.J. Clawson in Slattery's People, Amanda Earp in The Rousters, Ruth Burton in Room for One More, Steve's grandmother in The Pursuit of Happiness, Maureen in Norby, Mrs. Jackson in Margie, and Lenore in Hail to the Chief.

She also appeared in numerous other television series, including: Perry Mason Season4/Episode12 "The Case of the Resolute Reformer" as Grace Witt; The Donna Reed Show, The Asphalt Jungle, Stoney Burke, The Outer Limits, Mr. Novak, The Partridge Family, The Wonder Years, Chicago Hope, Judging Amy, NYPD Blue, The Twilight Zone, and Trapper John, M.D., as well as the daytime dramas The Edge of Night, and The Young and the Restless.

She appeared in TV movies such as Goodbye, Raggedy Ann (1971) and The Suicide Club (1974). She appeared in feature films such as The Prisoner of Second Avenue (1975), Private Benjamin (1980), Coast to Coast (1980), and Time Share (2000).

== Personal life ==
Stuart was married to actors Frank Maxwell and later, David Shaw. She was a friend of writer Helene Hanff and is mentioned in Hanff's book 84, Charing Cross Road and is portrayed by Jean De Baer in the 1987 film of the same name.

== Death ==
Maxine Stuart died June 6, 2013, at her Beverly Hills, California home of natural causes at the age of 94.

== Recognition ==
For her role in The Wonder Years in 1989, Stuart was nominated for the Primetime Emmy Award for Outstanding Guest Actress in a Comedy Series.

== Filmography ==
=== Film ===
Year	Title	Role	Notes
1959	Career	Television Agent	Uncredited
1962	Days of Wine and Roses	Dottie	
1964	Kitten with a Whip	Peggy	
1964	Dear Heart	Rita	
1969	Winning	Miss Redburne's Mother	Uncredited
1969	The Lost Man	Miss Harrison	
1970	Suppose They Gave a War and Nobody Came	Zelda	also known as War Games, Old Soldiers Never
1971	Making It	Miss Schneider	
1975	The Prisoner of Second Avenue	Belle	
1977	Fun with Dick and Jane	Charles' Secretary	
1980	Coast to Coast	Sam Klinger	
1980	Private Benjamin	Aunt Betty	
1987	Like Father Like Son	Phyllis, Hammonds' Housekeeper	
2000	Time Share	Ruth Farragher	

=== Television ===
Year	Title	Role	Notes
1946	Sorry, Wrong Number		TV Movie
1946	NBC Television Theatre		Season 1 Episode 2: "Mr. and Mrs. North"
1950	Starlight Theatre		Season 1 Episode 6: "The Song the Soldiers Sang"
1950–1951	Lux Video Theatre	Millie / Marcia / Girl	3 episodes
1950–1954	Robert Montgomery Presents	Josie Trent	3 episodes
1951	Inside Detective		Season 2 Episode 42: "The Knife & the Number"
1951–1953	The Philco Television Playhouse		5 episodes
1952	The Web		Season 2 Episode 23: "Friends of the Devil"
1952–1953	Goodyear Television Playhouse		2 episodes
1953	Follow Your Heart		Series regular
1954	Colonel Humphrey Flack		Season 1 Episode 31: "King Hakmir Khan"
1954–1955	Modern Romances		6 episodes
1954–1958	Armstrong Circle Theatre	Sue Hornmeyer / Mrs. Broggi / Anne	4 episodes
1955	Studio One	Marie Cameron	Season 7 Episode 34: "A Picture in the Paper"
1955	Kraft Television Theatre		Season 2 Episode 40: "Death Is a Spanish Dancer"
1955	Norby	Maureen	Series regular
1955–1957	The Big Story	Mae / Elaine Manners	2 episodes
1956	General Electric Theater	Alice	Season 4 Episode 27: "Easter Gift"
1956–1957	The Edge of Night	Grace O'Keefe	4 episodes
1957–1958	True Story		2 episodes
1959	Playhouse 90		Season 3 Episode 21: "The Ding-A-Ling Girl"
1960	Johnny Staccato	Velma Dean	Season 1 Episode 21: "The List of Death"
1960	Westinghouse Desilu Playhouse	Sharley Wynn	Season 2 Episode 14: "The Man in the Funny Suit"
1960	Bachelor Father	Adelaide Mitchell	Season 3 Episode 31: "Bentley and the Travel Agent"
1960	Adventures in Paradise	Harriet Flanders	Season 2 Episode 4: "Away from It All"
1960	The Twilight Zone	Janet Tyler (under bandages)	Episode: "Eye of the Beholder"
1960	Wanted: Dead or Alive	Jane Koster	Season 3 Episode 12: "The Choice"
1960–1961	The DuPont Show with June Allyson	Marion Carter / Agnes McCutcheon	2 episodes
1960–1965	The Donna Reed Show	Ellen Cruikshank / Helena Whitcomb	2 episodes
1961	Perry Mason	Grace Witt	Season 4 Episode 14: "The Case of the Resolute Reformer"
1961	The Law and Mr. Jones	Mary Cole	Season 1 Episode 17: "The End Justifies the End"
1961	The Asphalt Jungle	Helen Gordon	Season 1 Episode 3: "The Friendly Gesture"
1961	The Many Loves of Dobie Gillis	Mrs. Bean	Season 3 Episode 9: "The Second Most Beautiful Girl in the World"
1962	Hazel	Louise	Season 1 Episode 18: "Hazel's Secret Wish"
1962	Checkmate	Dianne Cartwright	Season 2 Episode 30: "Rendezvous in Washington"
1962	Target: The Corruptors!	Sheila Murray	2 episodes
1962	Kraft Mystery Theater	Jane	Season 2 Episode 1: "In Close Pursuit"
1962	Room for One More	Ruth Burton	Series regular
1962	The Lloyd Bridges Show	Miss Elliott	Season 1 Episode 3: "My Child Is Yet a Stranger"
1962–1964	The Eleventh Hour	Eunice Sanders / Mrs. Henderson	3 episodes
1962–1964	Dr. Kildare	Nurse Mary Ayers / Admitting Nurse / Nurse Lucy Hyde	7 episodes
1963	Stoney Burke	Hilda Pollard	Season 1 Episode 14: "Gold-Plated Maverick"
1963	The Outer Limits	Mrs. McCluskey	Episode: "The Man Who Was Never Born"
1963	Arrest and Trial	May Curtis	Season 1 Episode 9: "Inquest Into a Bleeding Heart"
1963–1964	Mr. Novak	Angie / Miss Gardner	2 episodes
1964	The Fugitive	Mrs. Gaines / Nurse Proctor	2 episodes
1964–1965	Slattery's People	B.J. Clawson	6 episodes
1964–1968	Peyton Place	Mrs. Hewitt	6 episodes
1965	The Young Marrieds	Martha Coleman	16 episodes (Recurring role)
1966	Please Don't Eat the Daisies	Mrs. Cunningham	Season 2 Episode 3: "A-Hunting We Will Go"
1966	That Girl	Manager	Season 1 Episode 14: "Phantom of the Horse Opera"
1966–1972	The F.B.I.	Mrs. Gennaro / Mrs. Peabody / Mrs. Stone / Bank Employee	4 episodes
1967	Love on a Rooftop	Mrs. Gorman	Season 1 Episode 25: "The Sell Out"
1967	Get Smart	Nurse #1	Season 2 Episode 29: "A Man Called Smart: Part 2"
1968	General Hospital	Mrs. Dawson	Episode dated 18 December
1968	Judd for the Defense	Myra Jenkins	Season 2 Episode 12: "A Swim with Sharks"
1969	Bracken's World	Inez	Season 1 Episode 10: "Package Deal"
1970	Room 222	Parent	Season 2 Episode 11: "The Valediction"
1971	Travis Logan, D.A.		TV Movie
1971	Goodbye, Raggedy Ann	Clerk	TV Movie
1971	Love, American Style		Season 3 Episode 8: "segment: Love and the Sweet Sixteen"
1971	The Bold Ones: The Lawyers	Ellen Morley	Season 3 Episode 6: "Justice Is a Sometime Thing"
1972–1974	Cannon	Etta, Poker Player / Irene	2 episodes
1972–1974	The Partridge Family	Mrs. Damion / Gloria Hoffsteader / Miss Halstead	3 episodes
1973	The Wide World of Mystery	Mrs. Higbee	Season 1 Episode 5: "Suicide Club"
1973	Barnaby Jones	Ida	Season 2 Episode 10: "The Black Art of Dying"
1973	The Streets of San Francisco	Nurse Evans	Season 2 Episode 14: "Most Feared in the Jungle"
1974	Firehouse	Gladys	Season 1 Episode 2: "Sentenced to Burn"
1974	Hawkins	Mrs. Constantine	Season 1 Episode 6: "Murder on the Thirteenth Floor"
1974	The Stranger Who Looks Like Me	Mrs. Weiner	TV Movie
1974	Tell Me Where It Hurts		TV Movie
1974	The Underground Man	Librarian	TV Movie
1974	Fools, Females and Fun	Miss Bickley	TV Movie
1974	The New Land		Season 1 Episode 4: "The Word Is: Mortal"
1974	The Bob Newhart Show	Mrs. Chaney	Season 3 Episode 7: "Dr. Ryan's Express"
1974	Amy Prentiss	Whitman's Secretary	Season 1 Episode 1: "Baptism of Fire"
1975	One of Our Own	Scotty	TV Movie
1975	Doctors' Hospital	Scotty	2 episodes
1975	Medical Story		Season 1 Episode 9: "Us Against the World"
1976	Rich Man, Poor Man - Book II	Secretary	Season 1 Episode 2: "Chapter II"
1976–1977	Executive Suite	Marge Newberry	Series regular
1976–1979	Visions	Emily / June	2 episodes
1977	Hunter		Season 1 Episode 1: "Bluebird Is Back"
1977	Kill Me If You Can	Mrs. Asher	TV Movie
1977	The San Pedro Beach Bums	Ginny	Season 1 Episode 8: "A Bum Thanksgiving"
1977–1982	Quincy M.E.	Judge Daley / Margo Hennessy	2 episodes
1979	The Seeding of Sarah Burns	Flora	TV Movie
1979	Breaking Up Is Hard to Do	Gracie	TV Movie
1979	The Associates	Mrs. Milestone	Season 1 Episode 6: "The Deadly Serve"
1979–1980	Trapper John, M.D.	Ms. Langley	3 episodes
1981	Revenge of the Gray Gang	Daisy 'Boots' Duffy	TV Movie
1982	The Rules of Marriage	Ingrid Olsen	TV Movie
1982	The Devlin Connection		Season 1 Episode 9: "Arsenic and Old Caviar"
1983	Cagney & Lacey	Rose	Season 2 Episode 21: "A Cry for Help"
1983	Carpool	Ruth Grogan	TV Movie
1983–1984	The Rousters	Amanda Earp	Series regular
1984	Hill Street Blues	Mrs. Simmons	Season 5 Episode 5: "Bangladesh Slowly"
1985	A Reason to Live	Fay Stewart	TV Movie
1985	Hail to the Chief	Lenore	4 episodes
1987	L.A. Law	Ellen Perle	Season 1 Episode 13: "Prince Kuzak in a Can"
1987	Hooperman	Estelle Metzler	Season 1 Episode 1: "Hooperman"
1989	The Wonder Years	Mrs. Carples	Season 2 Episode 7: "Coda"
1989	Snoops	Charlotte Lowell	Season 1 Episode 4: "Mr. Dennis's Neighborhood"
1990	Doctor Doctor	Olivia Judd	Season 3 Episode 2: "Murder, He Wrote"
1993	Murphy Brown	Amy Shoemaker	Season 5 Episode 16: "The Intern"
1993–1994	Hearts Afire	Velma Davis	8 episodes
1993–1996	The Young and the Restless	Margaret Anderson	22 episodes
1993–1997	NYPD Blue	Catherine Kelly / Edith Murphy	2 episodes
1994	The Haunting of Seacliff Inn	Lorraine Adler	TV Movie
1995	The Pursuit of Happiness	Eleanor 'Gram' Rutledge	Series regular
1996–1997	Chicago Hope	Harriet Owens	3 episodes
1997	Murder One	Mrs. Gunther	Season 2 Episode 13: "Chapter Thirteen, Year Two"
1997	Murder One: Diary of a Serial Killer	Mrs. Gunther	Miniseries; 6 episodes
1998	Cybill	Grandma Robbins	Season 4 Episode 18: "Whose Wife Am I, Anyway?"
1998	Nothing Sacred	Ellie	Season 1 Episode 20: "Felix Culpa"
1999	Providence	Willa, Teenager's Aunt	2 episodes
2002	Family Law	Angela Dell	Season 3 Episode 20: "Ties That Bind"
2003	Judging Amy	Jane	Season 4 Episode 15: "Maxine Interrupted"
