= Room for One More (TV series) =

American family comedy-drama film

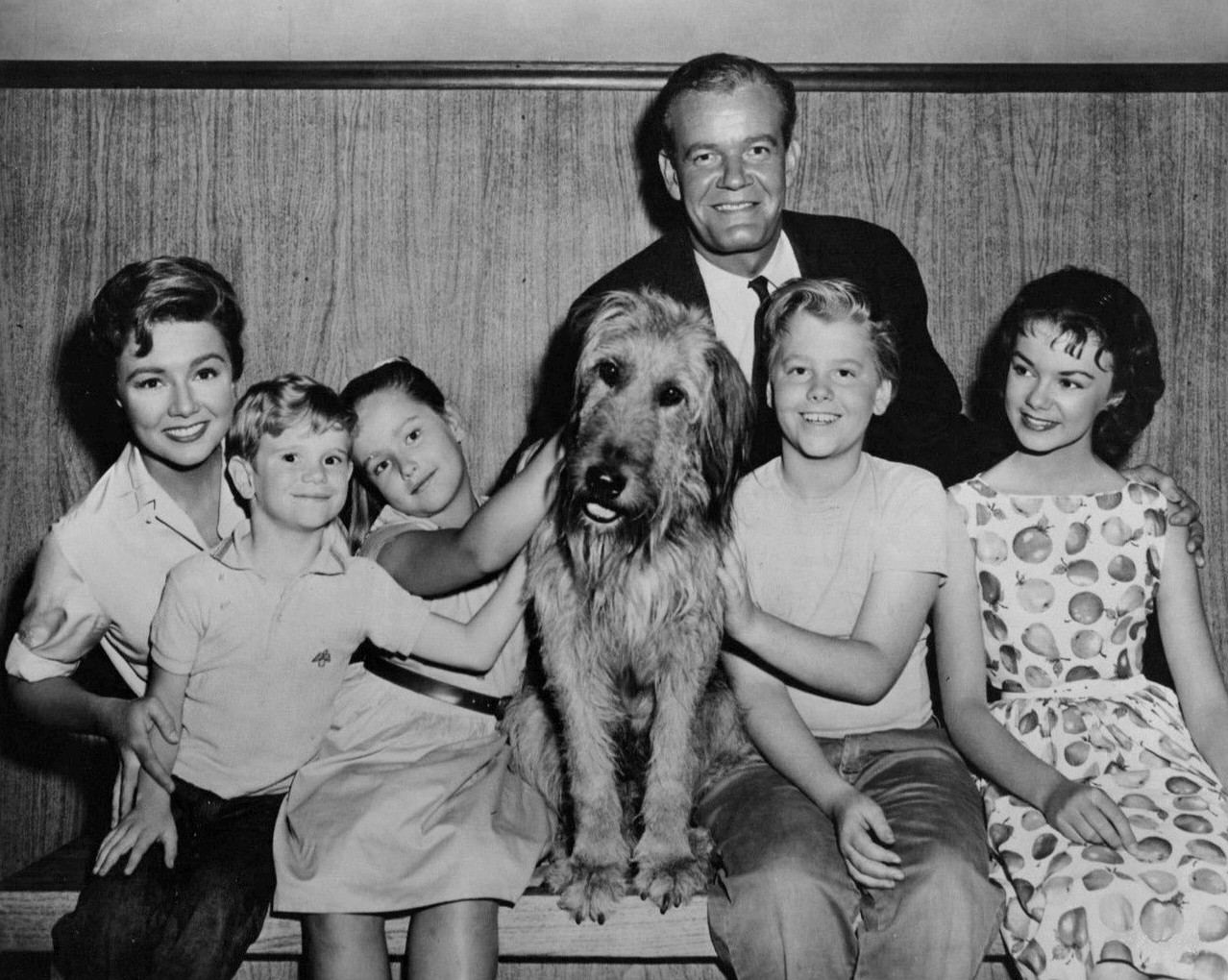
- The cast from left: Peggy McCay, Ronnie Dapo, Carol Nicholson, Andrew Duggan and Tramp, Tim Rooney and Ahna Capri.
- Genre: Sitcom
- Based on: Room for One More (film) and Room for One More by Anna Perrot Rose
- Directed by: Leslie H. Martinson; Charles R. Rondeau and others
- Starring: Andrew Duggan; Peggy McCay; Ronnie Dapo; Carol Nicholson; Ahna Capri; Tim Rooney; Jack Albertson; Maxine Stuart
- Theme music composer: Jerry Fuller
- Country of origin: United States
- Original language: English
- No. of seasons: 1
- No. of episodes: 26

Production
- Executive producer: William T. Orr
- Producer: Ed Jurist
- Editor: Byron Chudnow
- Camera setup: Multi-camera
- Running time: 30 minutes
- Production company: Warner Bros. Television

Original release
- Network: ABC
- Release: January 27 – July 28, 1962

Related
- Room for One More (film) The Brady Bunch My Three Sons

Room for One More is an American sitcom, starring Andrew Duggan and Peggy McCay, which aired on ABC from January 27 until July 28, 1962.

== Premise ==
Duggan and McCay played George and Anne Rose. The premise and humor came from their decision to augment their existing family with two adopted children. Actors playing the children included Tim Rooney, Ahna Capri, Carol Nicholson, and Ronnie Dapo. Jack Albertson played a neighbor, Walter Burton, with Maxine Stuart as his wife, Ruth Burton. Tommy Farrell played the character Fred in five episodes.

Room for One More and its contemporary, My Three Sons "were significant departures from the mom-and-pop model of the family" that typified American television comedy of its era. Similar to The Brady Bunch, which debuted seven years later, the plots on Room for One More tended to feature "easily solvable situations".

Among the guest stars were Parley Baer, Bob Hastings, Sandy Kenyon, Sue Ane Langdon, Robert Q. Lewis, Howard McNear, Maudie Prickett, and Gary Vinson.

Room for One More aired at 8:00 p.m. Eastern time on Saturday, having replaced another ABC/WB offering, The Roaring 20s.

The series was based on the 1952 film version, which starred Cary Grant and his wife Betsy Drake.

== Cast ==
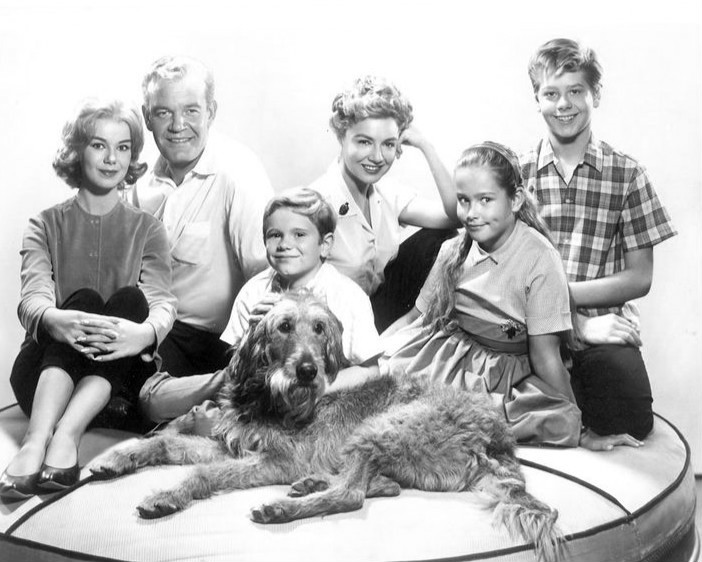
Cast of Room for One More

- Andrew Duggan as George Rose
- Peggy McCay as Anne Rose
- Tim Rooney as Jeff Rose
- Carol Nicholson as Laurie Rose
- Jack Albertson as Walter Burton
- Maxine Stuart as Ruth Burton
- Ronnie Dapo as Flip Rose
- Ahna Capri as Mary Rose

== Episodes ==
No.	Title	Directed by	Written by	Original release date
1	"The Anniversary"	Leslie H. Martinson	Teleplay by : Jerry Davis; From a screenplay by: Robert O'Brien and Irving Elinson	January 27, 1962
2	"Greeks Bearing Gifts"	Leslie H. Martinson	Peter Bradford and Laurence Marks	February 3, 1962
3	"Seated One Day at the Organ"	Gene Reynolds	Michael Morris & Larry Markes	February 10, 1962
4	"Girl from Sweden"	Andrew McCullough	Michael Morris & Arnold Horwitt and Laurence Marks	February 17, 1962
5	"Angel in the Attic"	Norman Tokar	Story by : Laurence Marks; Teleplay by : Laurence Marks and Milt Rosen	February 24, 1962
6	"A Trip to the Beach"	Andrew McCullough	Story by : Henry Sharp; Teleplay by : Henry Sharp and Laurence Marks	March 3, 1962
7	"This Gun for Sale"	Gene Reynolds	Leo Rifkin	March 10, 1962
8	"Speaker of the House"	Unknown	Unknown	March 17, 1962
9	"Strength Through Money"	Unknown	Unknown	March 24, 1962
10	"I Retake This Woman"	Unknown	Unknown	March 31, 1962
11	"Love Thy Neighbor"	Gene Reynolds	Larry Rhine & Milton Pascal	April 7, 1962
12	"The Real George"	Unknown	Unknown	April 14, 1962
13	"Two Many Parents"	Unknown	Unknown	April 21, 1962
14	"Our Man in Brazil"	Gene Reynolds	Milton Pascal & Larry Rhine	April 28, 1962
15	"Flip's Loyalty Test"	Unknown	Unknown	May 5, 1962
16	"What Is It?"	Marc Lawrence	Phil Sharp	May 12, 1962
17	"King of the Little People"	Marc Lawrence	Michael Fessier	May 19, 1962
18	"Danger: Man at Work"	Charles R. Rondeau	Mel Tolkin & Leo Rifkin	May 26, 1962
19	"The Right Wrong Number"	Robert Sparr	Teleplay by : Norman Tokar; From a Story by: Norman Tokar & Ed Jurist	June 2, 1962
20	"Little School House in Red"	Leslie H. Martinson	Laurence Marks	June 9, 1962
21	"A New Twist"	Leslie H. Martinson	Phil Sharp	June 16, 1962
22	"Out at Home"	James V. Kern	Clifford Goldsmith	June 23, 1962
23	"Happiness is Just a State of Mind"	James V. Kern	Michael Morris and Arnold Horwitt	June 30, 1962
24	"Bonjour, Rose Family"	Unknown	Unknown	July 7, 1962
25	"Ribbins and Beaus"	Seymour Robbie	Larry Markes & Harvey Bullock	July 14, 1962
26	"Son of a Boss"	Norman Abbott	Teleplay by : Eugene Mason; From a screenplay by: Robert O'Brien & Irving Elinson	July 28, 1962
