= Ahna Capri =

American actress (1944–2010)

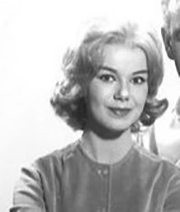
- in Room for One More (1962)
- Born: Anna Marie Nanasi; July 6, 1944; Budapest, Hungary
- Died: August 19, 2010 (aged 66); Los Angeles, California, U.S.
- Occupation: Actress
- Years active: 1956–1979
- Relatives: Peter Robbins (brother)

Anna Marie Nanasi (July 6, 1944 – August 19, 2010), better known by her professional name Ahna Capri (also as Anna Capri), was a Hungarian-American film and television actress best known for her role as Tania (secretary of Han) in the martial-arts film Enter the Dragon (1973).

== Early life ==
She was born to Hungarian parents in Budapest and arrived in the United States with her family as a refugee in 1950. Her younger brother, Louis, who used the stage name Peter Robbins, was the voice of Charlie Brown in the Peanuts animated specials.

== Career ==
Capri started her career as a child actress, appearing on such series as Father Knows Best, The Danny Thomas Show, The Adventures of Rin Tin Tin, Leave It to Beaver — in the role of Cindy Andrews in "Eddie's Sweater" (1963) and Cinda Dunsworth in "Lumpy's Scholarship" (1963) — as Anna Capri, and a recurring role as Edie Westrope on The George Burns and Gracie Allen Show in 1958. She made her film debut at the age of thirteen in Outlaw's Son. She appeared thereafter in more films and television series, including roles in two CBS westerns in 1959, as Dolly Cleary in "The Littlest Client" on Wanted: Dead or Alive, starring Steve McQueen, and as Debbie McCallin in "McCallin's Daughter" on Trackdown, with Robert Culp.

In 1962, Capri was cast in a recurring role as Mary Rose in the ABC/Warner Bros Television sitcom, Room for One More. She appeared on other ABC/WB series, including Maverick, Sugarfoot, Cheyenne, Bronco, 77 Sunset Strip.

In 1967, Capri appeared as Cpl. Terry Cahill in Season 3, Episode 17 "The Hunters and the Killers" of Twelve O'Clock High.

Later, Capri appeared in Branded, The Monroes, The Iron Horse, The Guns of Will Sonnett, Laredo, The Wild Wild West, Run for Your Life, The F.B.I., Banyon, Baretta, Banacek, Mannix, The Mod Squad, Ironside, Cannon, The Invaders, The Man From U.N.C.L.E., Adam-12, The Name of the Game, Police Story, Search, and Kojak.

In 1971, Capri played Linda Perry in two episodes of ABC's crime drama Dan August, starring Burt Reynolds. In 1972, she was cast in the film Payday, with Rip Torn in the lead role as a country music singer in Alabama. Beginning in the 1970s, she used the spelling Ahna Capri in order to reflect the correct pronunciation of her first name.

== Death ==
On August 9, 2010, Capri was in a car accident in which a 5-ton truck collided with her car. After 10 days in a coma and on life support, she died on August 19 at age 66.

== Filmography ==
=== Film ===
Year	Title	Role	Notes
1956	The Opposite Sex	Child	Uncredited
1957	Outlaw's Son	Amy Wentworth - as a Child	
1958	The Remarkable Mr. Pennypacker	Babs Pennypacker	Uncredited
1963	Critic's Choice	Daughter	Uncredited
1964	Kisses for My President	Gloria McCloud	
1965	The Girls on the Beach	Arlene	
1969	Target: Harry	Francesca	
1970	Darker than Amber	Del	
1971	The Brotherhood of Satan	Nicky	
1972	Piranha	Terry Greene	
1973	Payday	Mayleen Travis	
1973	Enter the Dragon	Tania	
1975	The Specialist	Londa Wyeth	
1976	The Bingo Long Traveling All-Stars & Motor Kings	The Prostitute	

=== Television ===
Year	Title	Role	Notes
1955	The Red Skelton Show	Child Ballerina #1 / Child Saloon Flirt	2 episodes
1956	Letter to Loretta	Celise (uncredited)	Season 3 Episode 27: "His Inheritance"
1956–1957	Make Room for Daddy	Delilah / Ruthie	2 episodes
1957	Father Knows Best	Lisping Spelling Bee Contestant (uncredited)	Season 3 Episode 30: "The Spelling Bee"
1957	Telephone Time	Delores	Season 2 Episode 31: "Stranded"
1957	The Adventures of Rin Tin Tin	Penelope Chastworth	Season 3 Episode 34: "Hubert's Niece"
1957	Panic!		Season 1 Episode 13: "Child's Play"
1957	The Walter Winchell File	Lucy	Season 1 Episode 10: "The Cupcake"
1957	Circus Boy	Irma Cody	Season 2 Episode 13: "The Return of Buffalo Bill"
1958	Sugarfoot	Willie Ann Miles	Season 1 Episode 18: "Short Range"
1958	Buckskin	Sara	Season 1 Episode 9: "The Gold Watch"
1958	The George Burns and Gracie Allen Show	Edie Westrope	3 episodes
1959	Trackdown	Debby McCallin	Season 2 Episode 18: "McCallin's Daughter"
1959	Wanted: Dead or Alive	Dolly Cleary	Season 1 Episode 34: "Littlest Client"
1960	Maverick	School Child (uncredited)	Season 4 Episode 7: "A Bullet for the Teacher"
1960–1962	The Many Loves of Dobie Gillis	Gilroy Daughter / Clarissa Spangler	3 episodes
1961	Cheyenne	Mary Randall	Season 6 Episode 2: "Trouble Street"
1962	77 Sunset Strip	Karen Bristol	Season 4 Episode 20: "The Bridal Trail Caper"
1962	Bronco	Emily Taylor (Age 15)	Season 4 Episode 16: "A Town That Lived and Died"
1962	Surfside 6	Anna	Season 2 Episode 39: "House on Boca Key"
1962	Room for One More	Mary Rose	Series regular
1963	Leave It to Beaver	Cinda Dunsworth / Cindy Andrews	2 episodes
1963	Dr. Kildare	Nurse	Season 3 Episode 12: "Charlie Wade Makes Lots of Shade"
1964	The Jack Benny Program	Roxanne Lewis	Season 14 Episode 27: "Harlow Gets a Date"
1965	Branded	Robin Shields	2 episodes
1966	Laredo	Sally Fletcher	Season 2 Episode 5: "The Land Slickers"
1966	I Spy	Jolie Cagny	Season 2 Episode 8: "Will the Real Good Guys Please Stand Up?"
1966	One of Our Spies Is Missing	Do Do	TV Movie
1966–1967	The Man from U.N.C.L.E.	Tavia Sandor / Abbe Melton	2 episodes
1967	12 O'Clock High	Corporal Terry Cahill	Season 3 Episode 17: "The Hunters and the Killers"
1967	The Felony Squad	Jenny Jason	Season 1 Episode 23: "The Desperate Silence"
1967	The Monroes	Polly Deaver	Season 1 Episode 26: "Ghosts of Paradox"
1967	The Wild Wild West	Abigail Moss	Season 3 Episode 7: "The Night of the Hangman"
1967	Iron Horse	Angie Carter	Season 2 Episode 10: "Steel Chain to a Music Box"
1968	The Invaders	Joan Surrat	Season 2 Episode 18: "Counter-Attack"
1968	The Guns of Will Sonnett	Laurie	Season 1 Episode 2: "Stopover in a Troubled Town"
1968	Run for Your Life	Diana Weston	Season 3 Episode 24: "Life Among the Meat-Eaters"
1968–1971	The F.B.I.	Betty Kendall / Sarah Holmquist	2 episodes
1968–1973	The Mod Squad	Doris Williams / Florinda	2 episodes
1969	The Name of the Game	Lainie Evers	Season 1 Episode 16: "Swingers Only"
1969	The Outsider	Tracy Stratton	Season 1 Episode 18: "Behind God's Back"
1969	Adam-12	Penelope Lang	Season 1 Episode 24: "Log 172: The Things You Do for the Job"
1970	To Rome with Love	Julie	Season 1 Episode 20: "The Pretty Little Girl"
1970	It Takes a Thief	Marcia Narden	Season 3 Episode 23: "Beyond a Treasonable Doubt"
1970	Company of Killers	Maryjane Smythe	TV Movie
1971	Ironside	Miss Vickers	Season 4 Episode 23: "Accident"
1971	Dan August	Linda Perry	Season 1 Episode 25: "Prognosis: Homicide"
1971	The Smith Family	Joyce Baxter	Season 2 Episode 3: "Stakeout"
1972	O'Hara United States Treasury	Jean Houser	Season 1 Episode 21: "Operation: Good Citizen"
1972	Mannix	Billie Caprice	Season 6 Episode 4: "Broken Mirror"
1972	Banacek	Madame Pompadour	Season 1 Episode 3: "No Sign of the Cross"
1972	Owen Marshall, Counselor at Law	Barbara Thayer	Season 2 Episode 8: "Who Saw Him Die?"
1972	Banyon	Amy Cullen	Season 1 Episode 9: "Think of Me Kindly"
1972	Love, American Style	Gornaga (segment: "Love and the First Kiss")	Season 4 Episode 12: "Love and the First Kiss/Love and the Impressionist/Love and the Super Lover"
1973	Search	Pam Perry	Season 1 Episode 17: "The Clayton Lewis Document"
1973	Cannon	Sharon	Season 3 Episode 7: "Come Watch Me Die"
1973–1975	Police Story	Miss Hadley / Jane	2 episodes
1975	Kojak	Carol	Season 3 Episode 2: "My Brother, My Enemy"
1975	Matt Helm	Monique Ledoux	Season 1 Episode 6: "Squeeze Play"
1976	Baretta	Mercedes Morrison	Season 2 Episode 20: "Death on the Run"
1977	Man from Atlantis	Louisa	Season 1 Episode 12: "The Naked Montague"
1978	Nowhere to Run	Charleen	TV Movie
1979	Mrs. Columbo	Dorsie Hall	Season 2 Episode 5: "A Chilling Surprise"
