= Thano Rama =

American actor

- Born: Thano Chrisoheris; 1945 (age 80–81); Los Angeles, California
- Education: Van Nuys High School; Van Nuys Adult School
- Occupation: Actor
- Years active: 1956–1964

Thano Rama (born Thano Chrisoheris; 1945) is an American former child actor, known for his performances in Jean Kerr's King of Hearts and the Playhouse 90 episode, "The Cruel Day", by Reginald Rose. He also co-starred with Jack Carson on the Alfred Hitchcock Presents episode, "The Children of Alda Nuova".

== Early life and career ==
Born in Los Angeles, Rama is the son of Jean and Socrates "Rudy" Chrisoheris (the latter being a Greek emigre who worked under the name "Rudy Rama" as a Hollywood bit player in the late 1940s and early fifties). His first documented public performance came at approximately 10 years of age, as Dr. Quick in an all-juvenile production of David Copperfield, prompting Van Nuys News writer Chaffee Castleton to describe Rama and two fellow cast members as "children [who], although small in stature, have a tremendous sense of dignity that compels admiration." The following year, Rama's "scene-steal[ing]" work in Jean Kerr's comedy, King of Hearts, earned kudos from both the Hollywood Citizen-News and Hollywood Reporter, eventually resulting in a successful screen test with Warner Brothers.

It was on the strength of that test that Rama was cast in 1958 as the juvenile lead opposite Richard Long and Peggy McKay in Warner's pilot for Room for One More, a projected sitcom spin-off of the studio's like-named 1952 feature film, starring real-life newlyweds Cary Grant and Betsy Drake. Unfortunately, the finished product failed to attract a buyer, and it was not until January 1962 that its newly shot and almost entirely re-cast reboot finally debuted on ABC, with the busy Long now replaced by Andrew Duggan, and Rama—having, by then, aged out of consideration for the protagonist's mid-teens adoptee—by Mickey Rooney's 14-year-old son, Tim.

In the meantime, Rama had accumulated a good number of credits from 1959 on, including guest spots on Day in Court, Border Patrol, Markham, The Lawless Years, and Law of the Plainsman, as well as a 30-minute short film entitled Front Page Bible, which appears to have originated as an episode of the Lutheran Church-sponsored, Family Films Inc.-produced religious series, This Is the Life.

Rama's best known work is almost certainly his portrayal, in February 1960, of the Algerian prisoner in the acclaimed Playhouse 90 episode "The Cruel Day", written by Reginald Rose and directed by Franklin Schaffner. Deemed "impressive" by New York Times critic Jack Gould, Rama's performance, along with that of three co-stars, made a particular impression on the Des Moines Register's Ogden Dwight.

Van Heflin as the French captain in the Algerian conflict, Charles Bronson as a patriotic but concerned sergeant, and two talented young actors, Thano Rama as a captive Algerian lad and Miko Oscard as the captain's son, gave controlled and moving interpretations to difficult roles in extremely difficult scenes.

== Personal life ==
In August 1958, Picturegoer's Donovan Pedelty prefaced his brief mention of the new contract with Warners with the news that Rama had changed his name to Chris Harris. Nowhere else was this news reported. If this was Rama's idea, Warners does not appear to have been on board. He continued to be referred to, both onscreen and in print, exclusively as Thano Rama—or, towards the end, Chrisoheris—throughout his decade-plus as at least a semi-public figure.

Having completed at least one year at Van Nuys High School as of September 1960, Rama later attended Van Nuys Adult School, where—as Thano Chrisoheris—he received his high school diploma on June 15, 1966, serving as one of two class speakers at that day's commencement exercises. Not quite six months later, Rama—cum Chrisoheris–was once again in the news, as the injured passenger in a collision between his father's station wagon and another vehicle at the intersection of Vanowen and Laurel Canyon Boulevard in North Hollywood.

== Filmography ==
- Room for One More (1958) Unsold pilot for the like-named 1962 series – Male juvenile lead
- This Is the Life (1958) Episode "Front Page Bible" – Tony
- This Is Alice (1958)
- Day in Court (1959) Unknown episode(s) – Stanley Barker
- Border Patrol (1959) Season 1 Episode 7: "Tide of Death" – Roberto
- Markham (1959) Season 1 Episode 5: "The Human Factor" – Paul, Young Witness
- The Lawless Years (1959) Season 2 Episode 6: "The Joe Angelo Story" – Tony Angelo
- Law of the Plainsman (1959) Season 1 Episode 14: "Calculated Risk" – Dave
- Playhouse 90 (1960) Season 4 Episode 11: "The Cruel Day" – Yazid Boussena, Algerian Prisoner
- The Loretta Young Show
- Two Faces West (1961) Season 1 Episode 14: "The Witness" – Porro
- Alfred Hitchcock Presents (1962) Season 7 Episode 35: "The Children of Alda Nuova" – Paolo
- Mr. Novak (1963) Season 1 Episode 6: "The Risk" – Lou
- Bedtime Story (1964) – Bellboy (uncredited)
