= Accused =

Accused or The Accused may refer to:

- A person suspected with committing a crime or offence; see Criminal charge
  - Suspect, a known person suspected of committing a crime
- The Accüsed, a 1980s Seattle crossover thrash band
- The Accused, a play by Jeffrey Archer
- Accused (podcast) a podcast produced by Wondery

== Film ==
- Accused (1925 film), an American silent film directed by Dell Henderson
- Accused (1936 film), a British film starring Douglas Fairbanks, Jr. and Dolores del Río
- Accused (1964 film), a Czechoslovak film directed by Ján Kadár and Elmar Klos
- Accused (2005 film), a Danish film
- Accused (2014 film), a Dutch film
- Accused (2023 film), a British thriller film
- Accused (2026 film), a Hindi film
- The Accused (1949 film), an American film starring Loretta Young and Robert Cummings
- The Accused (1960 film), an Argentine crime drama
- The Accused (1988 film), a film starring Jodie Foster and Kelly McGillis
- The Accused (2018 film), an Argentine film

== Television ==
- Accused (1958 TV series), an American courtroom drama television series
- Accused (1996 TV series), a British television legal drama series
- Accused (2010 TV series), a British television series created by Jimmy McGovern
- Accused (2015 TV series), a French television series created by Laurent Vivier
- Accused (2023 TV series), an American crime anthology series on Fox
- "Accused", an episode of the TV series In the Heat of the Night
- "The Accused" (Auf Wiedersehen, Pet), a 1983 episode
