= Fifi Oscard =

American talent agent

- Born: Fernande Oscard; June 19, 1920; Rockaway Beach, New York, U.S.
- Died: November 12, 2005 (aged 85); Los Angeles, California, U.S.
- Education: Barnard College
- Occupation: Talent agent
- Years active: 1949–2005
- Spouse: Harold M. Steinmetz (m. 1939; died 1984)
- Relatives: Army Archerd (cousin) Shep & Ian Murray (grandsons-founders of Vineyard Vines)

Fifi Oscard (born Fernande Oscard June 19, 1920 – November 12, 2005) was an American talent agent, perhaps best known for helping Margaret Edson develop her play W;t and for helping Orson Welles get the much-parodied "We will sell no wine before it's time" TV ads for Paul Masson. Oscard is the cousin of entertainment writer Army Archerd and the aunt of the former film and television child actor Miko Oscard.

== Early life and career ==
Born in Rockaway Beach, Queens and raised in Cedarhurst, Oscard was the youngest of three children born to French parents, Maurice N. Oscard and Helene Berthet. She attended Barnard College.

Having attended college, married at 19, and raised two children in the interim, Oscard began her career in 1949, with the Olga Lee-Stephen Draper Agency and, in 1952, with Lucille Phillips, where, two years later, she was promoted to handling all television casting.

== Later career ==
Oscard began her agency in 1959.

Her client list included Orson Welles, Arthur Ashe (and his daughter Jeanne Moutoussamy-Ashe), Charles Aznavour, Eartha Kitt, Jacques Bergerac, Gloria Grahame, Alexander Scourby, Peggy Cass Ted Knight, Dorothy Lyman Christopher Gore, Gary Garrison, Terry Schreiber, Tom Ligon, Sam Tsoutsouvas, Wayland Flowers, Jack F. Matlock Jr. Patwant Singh, Billy Klüver James MacGregor Burns, Susan Dunn, Robert McElvaine, and Walter Sullivan.

Oscard represented film noir icon Gloria Grahame during the years leading up to her death, and is portrayed by the British actress Suzanne Bertish in the 2017 biopic Film Stars Don't Die in Liverpool.

In 2002, Oscard received the League of Professional Theater Women's Lifetime Achievement Award for her "countless years of creative contributions to American theater."

== Personal life and death ==
Oscard was married to attorney Harold M. Steinmetz from 1939 until his death in 1984. They had two children.

Predeceased by her husband and daughter, Oscard died on November 12, 2005, aged 85. She was survived by her son and several grandchildren and great-grandchildren, as well as her cousin, entertainment writer Army Archerd.
