= List of Lawman episodes =

Lawman is an American Western television series originally telecast on ABC from 1958 to 1962, starring John Russell as Marshal Dan Troop and Peter Brown as Deputy Marshal Johnny McKay. The series was set in Laramie, Wyoming, during 1879 and the 1880s. Warner Bros. already had several Western series on the air at the time.

== Series overview ==
Season	Episodes	Originally released		Rank	Average viewership (in millions)
Season	Episodes	First released	Last released	Rank	Average viewership (in millions)
1	39	October 5, 1958	June 28, 1959	27	11.4
2	37	October 4, 1959	June 19, 1960	15	12.0
3	39	September 18, 1960	June 11, 1961	26	10.5
4	41	September 17, 1961	June 24, 1962	Not in top 30	N/A

== Episodes ==
=== Season 1 (1958–59) ===
No. overall	No. in season	Title	Directed by	Written by	Original release date
1	1	"The Deputy"	Montgomery Pittman	Teleplay by : Dean Riesner; From a novel by : Harry Whittington	October 5, 1958
Dan Troop arrives in Laramie as the new marshal, following the killing of his predecessor David Lemp by town bully Flynn Hawks and his two brothers. He meets Lemp's widow Dru who owns a hash house and hires her assistant Johnny McKay as his deputy.: Bek Nelson as Dru Lemp, Edward Byrnes as Lacy Hawks; And Jack Elam as Flynn Hawks, Lee VanCleef as Walt Hawks, Stanley Farrar as Judge Patterson [credited but does not appear], Lane Chandler as Tom Pike, Rankin Mansfield as Carl Shoemaker Uncredited Jack Mower (bar patron)
2	2	"The Prisoner"	Richard L. Bare	Story by : Frank Gruber; Teleplay by : Edmund Morris	October 12, 1958
Swaggering cattle drover Dick Sellers goads boys and old men into losing gunfights. Judge Trager and Laramie's leading citizens tolerate their monthly visits since the drovers spend money, but Marshal Troop arrests Sellers.: Bek Nelson as Dru Lemp, John Doucette as Dick Sellers, William Henry as Doug Sutherland, Harry Cheshire as Judge Trager; And Jon Lormer as Harry Tate, K. L. Smith as Hank, Phil Tully as Jody, Lane Chandler as Tom Pike, Robert Williams as Caddo Colin Uncredited Fred Graham (bar patron)
3	3	"The Joker"	Stuart Heisler	Finlay McDermid	October 19, 1958
Barney Tremain, a former member of Quantrill's Raiders, kills his partner in crime, rides into Laramie and convinces Johnny McKay that he is his father, causing Johnny to consider himself unfit to carry a badge.: And Jeff York as Barney Tremain, Bek Nelson as Dru Lemp, Jon Lormer as Harry Tate, Emile Meyer as Sheriff Giles, Dub Taylor as Larry, I. Stanford Jolley as Gil Breck Uncredited Ray Boyle (partner killed by Tremain)
4	4	"The Oath"	Leslie H. Martinson	Story by : Irving Rubine; Teleplay by : William Leicester	October 26, 1958
Marshal Troop is driving a prison wagon with convicted murderer Lou Menke on his way to a hanging and Doctor Walter Brewer on his way to prison, but the wagon stops to help passengers of a stagecoach with a detached wheel.: Barbara Stuart as Lola Bordeaux, Whit Bissell as Thornton Eggles, Don Kelly as Lou Menke, Stephen Courtleigh as Doc Walter Brewer, Betty Lynn as Edna Phillips, John Cliff as Hurley
5	5	"The Outcast"	Stuart Heisler	Story by : William Leicester and Jack Emanuel; Teleplay by : William Leicester	November 2, 1958
Bob Ford, who shot Jesse James in the back, is in Laramie and Dan Troop orders him to leave on the next train before a lynch mob led by Ed Kelly puts a noose around his neck.: Dick Foran as Ed Kelly, Martin Landau as Bob Ford; And Tony Romano as Guitar Player, Stuart Randall as Stan Jackson, Emory Parnell as Hank, James Lydon as Nat Davis, Harry Harvey, Jr. as Willy Davis
6	6	"The Jury"	Richard L. Bare	Edmund Morris	November 9, 1958
7	7	"Wanted"	Leslie H. Martinson	Finlay McDermid	November 16, 1958
8	8	"The Badge"	Lee Sholem	Finlay McDermid & Bernard C. Schoenfeld	November 23, 1958
9	9	"Bloodline"	Leslie H. Martinson	Story by : Budd & Burt Arthur; Teleplay by : Finlay McDermid	November 30, 1958
10	10	"The Intruders"	Stuart Heisler	Story by : David Lang; Teleplay by : David Lang & Edmund Morris	December 7, 1958
11	11	"Short Straw"	Stuart Heisler	Clair Huffaker	December 14, 1958
12	12	"Lady in Question"	Alan Crosland Jr.	David Lang	December 21, 1958
13	13	"The Master"	Anton Leader	Story by : Finlay McDermid; Teleplay by : Finlay McDermid & Edmund Morris	December 28, 1958
14	14	"The Outsider"	Stuart Heisler	William F. Leicester	January 4, 1959
15	15	"The Captives"	Stuart Heisler	Edmund Morris	January 11, 1959
16	16	"The Encounter"	Stuart Heisler	Clair Huffaker	January 18, 1959
17	17	"The Brand Release"	Stuart Heisler	Story by : Oliver Crawford; Teleplay by : Oliver Crawford & Edmund Morris	January 25, 1959
18	18	"The Runaway"	Stuart Heisler	William F. Leicester	February 1, 1959
19	19	"Warpath"	Stuart Heisler	Dean Riesner	February 8, 1959
20	20	"The Gunman"	Stuart Heisler	Clair Huffaker	February 15, 1959
21	21	"The Big Hat"	Stuart Heisler	William F. Leicester	February 22, 1959
22	22	"The Chef"	Stuart Heisler	Story by : Mortimer Braus; Teleplay by : Edmund Morris	March 1, 1959
23	23	"The Posse"	Stuart Heisler	William F. Leicester	March 8, 1959
24	24	"The Visitor"	Stuart Heisler	Edmund Morris	March 15, 1959
25	25	"Battle Scar"	Stuart Heisler	Story by : Lawrence Menkin & Don Tait; Teleplay by : Edmund Morris	March 22, 1959
26	26	"The Gang"	Stuart Heisler	Story by : Eddie Anderson & Frederick Louis Fox; Teleplay by : Clair Huffaker & Edmund Morris	March 29, 1959
27	27	"The Souvenir"	Stuart Heisler	Story by : Frederick Louis Fox; Teleplay by : Edmund Morris	April 5, 1959
28	28	"The Young Toughs"	Leslie H. Martinson	Clair Huffaker	April 12, 1959
29	29	"Riding Shotgun"	Alan Crosland Jr.	Story by : Kenneth Perkins; Teleplay by : William F. Leicester	April 19, 1959
30	30	"The Journey"	Stuart Heisler	Edmund Morris	April 26, 1959
31	31	"The Huntress"	Stuart Heisler	Clair Huffaker	May 3, 1959
32	32	"The Return"	Stuart Heisler	Story by : James Barnett & Jules Schermer; Teleplay by : Finlay McDermid	May 10, 1959
33	33	"The Senator"	Stuart Heisler	Story by : Booker McClay; Teleplay by : Booker McClay & Clair Huffaker	May 17, 1959
34	34	"The Ring"	Leslie H. Martinson	Story by : Harry Whittington; Teleplay by : Edmund Morris	May 24, 1959
35	35	"The Bandit"	Lee Sholem	Oliver Crawford	May 31, 1959
36	36	"The Wayfarer"	Lee Sholem	Story by : William F. Leicester; Teleplay by : William F. Leicester & Edmund Morris	June 7, 1959
37	37	"The Conclave"	Mark Sandrich Jr.	Edmund Morris	June 14, 1959
38	38	"Bad Ransom"	Leslie H. Martinson	William F. Leicester	June 21, 1959
39	39	"The Friend"	Mark Sandrich Jr.	Clair Huffaker	June 28, 1959

=== Season 2 (1959–60) ===
No. overall	No. in season	Title	Directed by	Written by	Original release date
40	1	"Lily"	Leslie H. Martinson	Story by : Clair Huffaker; Teleplay by : Dean Riesner	October 4, 1959
41	2	"The Hunch"	Robert Sparr	William F. Leicester	October 11, 1959
42	3	"Shackled"	Leslie H. Martinson	William F. Leicester	October 18, 1959
43	4	"The Exchange"	Robert Sparr	Edmund Morris	October 25, 1959
44	5	"The Last Man"	Robert Sparr	Clair Huffaker	November 1, 1959
45	6	"The Breakup"	Paul Guilfoyle	Clair Huffaker	November 8, 1959
46	7	"Shadow Witness"	Everett Sloane	William F. Leicester	November 15, 1959
47	8	"The Prodigal"	Paul Stewart	William F. Leicester	November 22, 1959
48	9	"The Press"	Robert Sparr	Ric Hardman	November 29, 1959
49	10	"9:05 to North Platte"	Robert Sparr	Clair Huffaker	December 6, 1959
50	11	"The Hoax"	Robert Sparr	Dean Riesner	December 20, 1959
51	12	"The Shelter"	Paul Gulifoyle	Edmund Morris	December 27, 1959
52	13	"Last Stop"	Robert Sparr	Clair Huffaker	January 3, 1960
53	14	"The Showdown"	Robert Sparr	William F. Leicester	January 10, 1960
54	15	"The Stranger"	Robert Sparr	Clair Huffaker	January 17, 1960
55	16	"The Wolfer"	Robert Sparr	Ric Hardman	January 24, 1960
56	17	"The Hardcase"	Robert Sparr	William F. Leicester	January 31, 1960
57	18	"To Capture the West"	Robert Sparr	Clair Huffaker	February 7, 1960
58	19	"The Ugly Man"	Robert Sparr	Clair Huffaker	February 14, 1960
59	20	"The Kids"	Robert Sparr	Ric Hardman	February 21, 1960
60	21	"The Thimblerigger"	Robert Sparr	Ric Hardman	February 28, 1960
61	22	"The Truce"	Robert Sparr	Ric Hardman	March 6, 1960
62	23	"Reunion in Laramie"	Robert Sparr	William F. Leicester	March 13, 1960
63	24	"Thirty Minutes"	Robert Sparr	Richard Matheson	March 20, 1960
64	25	"Left Hand of the Law"	Robert Sparr	Story by : Margaret Armen; Teleplay by : Edmund Morris	March 27, 1960
65	26	"Belding's Girl"	Robert Sparr	William F. Leicester	April 3, 1960
66	27	"Girl from Grantsville"	Robert Sparr	Clair Huffaker	April 10, 1960
67	28	"Surface of Truth"	Robert Sparr	Ric Hardman	April 17, 1960
68	29	"The Salvation of Owny O'Reilly"	Robert Sparr	Ric Hardman	April 24, 1960
69	30	"The Lady Belle"	Robert Sparr	Ric Hardman	May 1, 1960
70	31	"The Payment"	Robert Sparr	Story by : Harry S. Franklin & Lewis Reed; Teleplay by : Berne Giler	May 8, 1960
71	32	"The Judge"	Robert Sparr	Story by : Montgomery Pittman; Teleplay by : W. Hermanos & Montgomery Pittman	May 15, 1960
72	33	"Man on a Wire"	Robert Sparr	W. Hermanos	May 22, 1960
73	34	"The Parting"	Robert Sparr	David Lang	May 29, 1960
74	35	"The Swamper"	Mark Sandrich Jr.	Story by : Finlay McDermid; Teleplay by : Edmund Morris	June 5, 1960
75	36	"Man on a Mountain"	Paul Guilfoyle, Arthur Lubin (uncredited)	Clair Huffaker	June 12, 1960
76	37	"Fast Trip to Cheyenne"	Robert Sparr	Story by : Jules Schermer; Teleplay by : W. Hermanos	June 19, 1960

=== Season 3 (1960–61) ===
No. overall	No. in season	Title	Directed by	Written by	Original release date
77	1	"The Town Boys"	Robert Sparr	Story by : Jules Schermer; Teleplay by : George Lairden	September 18, 1960
78	2	"The Go-Between"	Stuart Heisler	Story by : Jules Schermer; Teleplay by : Thomas Hyatt	September 26, 1960
79	3	"The Mad Bunch"	Robert Sparr	Ric Hardman	October 2, 1960
80	4	"The Old War Horse"	Robert Sparr	Ric Hardman	October 9, 1960
81	5	"Return of Owny O'Reilly"	Stuart Heisler	Ric Hardman	October 16, 1960
82	6	"Yawkey"	Stuart Heisler	Richard Matheson	October 23, 1960
83	7	"Dilemma"	Robert B. Sinclair	William F. Leicester	October 30, 1960
84	8	"The Post"	Marc Lawrence	Ric Hardman	November 6, 1960
85	9	"Chantay"	Robert B. Sinclair	Ric Hardman	November 13, 1960
86	10	"Samson the Great"	Stuart Heisler	Richard Matheson	November 20, 1960
87	11	"The Second Son"	Robert B. Sinclair	Ric Hardman	November 27, 1960
88	12	"The Catcher"	Marc Lawrence	William F. Leicester	December 4, 1960
89	13	"Cornered"	Marc Lawrence	Richard Matheson	December 11, 1960
90	14	"The Escape of Joe Kilmer"	Robert Sparr	Story by : Jules Schermer; Teleplay by : James Pitts	December 18, 1960
91	15	"Old Stefano"	Robert B. Sinclair	Ric Hardman	December 25, 1960
92	16	"The Robbery"	Robert Altman	Dean Riesner	January 1, 1961
93	17	"Firehouse Lil"	Leslie H. Martinson	Ric Hardman	January 8, 1961
94	18	"The Frame-Up"	Marc Lawrence	John Tomerlin	January 15, 1961
95	19	"The Marked Man"	Marc Lawrence	Story by : Victoria Schermer & Peter Schermer; Teleplay by : Paul Savage and Bronson Howitzer (aka Ric Hardman)	January 22, 1961
96	20	"The Squatters"	Marc Lawrence	William F. Leicester	January 29, 1961
97	21	"Homecoming"	Robert B. Sinclair	Richard Matheson	February 5, 1961
98	22	"Hassayampa"	Marc Lawrence	Ric Hardman	February 12, 1961
99	23	"The Promoter"	Leslie H. Martinson	Howard Browne	February 19, 1961
100	24	"Detweiler's Kid"	Marc Lawrence	Ric Hardman	February 26, 1961
101	25	"The Inheritance"	Marc Lawrence	John Tomerlin	March 5, 1961
102	26	"Blue Boss & Willie Shay"	Stuart Heisler	Ric Hardman	March 12, 1961
103	27	"The Man from New York"	Jim Faris	Hendrik Vollaerts	March 19, 1961
104	28	"Mark of Cain"	Marc Lawrence	Paul Savage	March 26, 1961
105	29	"Fugitive"	Marc Lawrence	Story by : John Downing; Teleplay by : John Downing and Bronson Howitzer (aka Ric Hardman)	April 2, 1961
106	30	"The Persecuted"	Richard C. Sarafian	Leonard Paul Smith	April 9, 1961
107	31	"The Grubstake"	Robert B. Sinclair	Bronson Howitzer (aka Ric Hardman) & Marc Mccarty	April 16, 1961
108	32	"Whiphand"	Marc Lawrence	Sheldon Stark	April 23, 1961
109	33	"The Threat"	Richard C. Sarafian	John Tomerlin	April 30, 1961
110	34	"The Trial"	Marc Lawrence	John Tomerlin	May 7, 1961
111	35	"Blind Hate"	Marc Lawrence	Rik Vollaerts	May 14, 1961
112	36	"The Break-In"	Richard C. Sarafian	Montgomery Pittman	May 21, 1961
113	37	"Conditional Surrender"	Marc Lawrence	Walter Wagner	May 28, 1961
114	38	"Cold Fear"	Richard C. Sarafian	Rik Vollaerts	June 4, 1961
115	39	"The Promise"	Irving J. Moore	John D.F. Black	June 11, 1961

=== Season 4 (1961–62) ===
No. overall	No. in season	Title	Directed by	Written by	Original release date
116	1	"Trapped"	Richard C. Sarafian	Walter Wagner	September 17, 1961
117	2	"The Juror"	Marc Lawrence	Ric Hardman	September 24, 1961
118	3	"The Four"	Richard C. Sarafian	John D.F. Black	October 1, 1961
119	4	"The Son"	Richard C. Sarafian	John D.F. Black	October 8, 1961
120	5	"Owny O'Reilly, Esquire"	Leslie H. Martinson	Ric Hardman	October 15, 1961
121	6	"The Substitute"	Robert B. Sinclair	Story by : Robert L. Palmer; Teleplay by : Bronson Howitzer (aka Ric Hardman)	October 22, 1961
122	7	"The Stalker"	Richard C. Sarafian	John Tomerlin	October 29, 1961
123	8	"The Catalog Woman"	Leslie H. Martinson	Ric Hardman	November 5, 1961
124	9	"The Cold One"	Richard C. Sarafian	Mark Rodgers	November 12, 1961
125	10	"Porphyria's Lover"	Richard C. Sarafian	Margaret Armen	November 19, 1961
126	11	"The Appointment"	Richard Benedict	John D.F. Black	November 26, 1961
127	12	"The Lords of Darkness"	Richard C. Sarafian	Mark Rodgers	December 3, 1961
128	13	"Tarot"	Robert B. Sinclair	Mark Rodgers	December 10, 1961
129	14	"The Prodigal Mother"	Robert B. Sinclair	Story by : Fanya Foss; Teleplay by : Paul Savage	December 17, 1961
130	15	"By the Book"	Irving J. Moore	John Tomerlin	December 24, 1961
131	16	"Trojan Horse"	Richard C. Sarafian	John Tomerlin	December 31, 1961
132	17	"The Locket"	Robert B. Sinclair	Margaret Armen	January 7, 1962
133	18	"A Friend of the Family"	Richard C. Sarafian	John Tomerlin	January 14, 1962
134	19	"The Vintage"	Richard C. Sarafian	John D.F. Black	January 21, 1962
135	20	"The Tarnished Badge"	Richard C. Sarafian	Margaret Armen	January 28, 1962
136	21	"No Contest"	Irving J. Moore	Berne Giler	February 4, 1962
137	22	"Change of Venue"	Richard C. Sarafian	Mark Rodgers	February 11, 1962
138	23	"The Holdout"	Richard C. Sarafian	Story by : Oc Rich; Teleplay by : Anthony Spinner	February 18, 1962
139	24	"The Barber"	Richard C. Sarafian	John D.F. Black	February 25, 1962
140	25	"The Long Gun"	Burt Kennedy	Burt Kennedy	March 4, 1962
141	26	"Clootey Hutter"	Richard C. Sarafian	Robert Vincent Wright	March 11, 1962
142	27	"Heritage of Hate"	Robert B. Sinclair	William F. Leicester	March 18, 1962
143	28	"Mountain Man"	Robert B. Sinclair	Sheldon Stark	March 25, 1962
144	29	"The Bride"	Richard C. Sarafian	Story by : Berne Giler; Teleplay by : John Tomerlin	April 1, 1962
145	30	"The Wanted Man"	Burt Kennedy	Burt Kennedy	April 8, 1962
146	31	"Sunday"	Burt Kennedy	Burt Kennedy	April 15, 1962
147	32	"The Youngest"	Robert B. SInclair	Story by : Eric Stone; Teleplay by : Eric Stone & John Tomerlin	April 22, 1962
148	33	"Cort"	Burt Kennedy	Anthony Spinner	April 29, 1962
149	34	"The Doctor"	Gunther von Fritsch	Story by : Oc Rich; Teleplay by : John D.F. Black & Oc Rich	May 6, 1962
150	35	"The Man Behind the News"	Robert B. Sinclair	Bill Idelson & John Tomerlin	May 13, 1962
151	36	"Get Out of Town"	Richard Benedict	Story by : Leo Gordon & Paul Leslie Pail; Teleplay by : John D.F. Black	May 20, 1962
152	37	"The Actor"	Richard C. Sarafian	Richard Matheson	May 27, 1962
153	38	"Explosion"	Richard C. Sarafian	Rik Vollaerts	June 3, 1962
154	39	"Jailbreak"	Paul Landres	Story by : Don Tait & Coles Trapnell; Teleplay by : John D.F. Black & Wells Root	June 10, 1962
155	40	"The Unmasked"	Robert B. Sinclair	Charles Smith	June 17, 1962
156	41	"The Witness"	Gunther von Fritsch	Jack Hawn	June 24, 1962
