= To the Sound of Trumpets =

9th episode of the 4th season of Playhouse 90

- Playhouse 90 episode
- Episode no.: Season 4 Episode 9
- Directed by: Buzz Kulik
- Written by: John Gay
- Original air date: February 9, 1960

Guest appearances
- Stephen Boyd as Capt. Leslie Cronyn; Dolores Hart as Janet Marshall; Judith Anderson as Madame Duvier; Boris Karloff as Guibert; Sam Jaffe as Schiller; Robert Coote as Sgt. Beggs

Episode chronology
← Previous "A Dream of Treason"	Next → "The Cruel Day"

"To the Sound of Trumpets" is an American television play broadcast on February 9, 1960, as part of the CBS television series, Playhouse 90. It is the ninth episode of the fourth season of Playhouse 90 and the 126th episode overall.

== Plot ==
The plot is a tragic love story set during World War I. British Army officer Capt. Leslie Cronyn deserts his unit after becoming disillusioned with the war. He meets American nurse Janet Marshall who holds a romantic view of the war as a glorious contest. The two fall in love and he finds new meaning in life, but complications arise, including Marshall's husband serving at the front and Cronyn's efforts to elude the military police and flee from France.

== Cast ==
- Stephen Boyd as Capt. Leslie Cronyn
- Dolores Hart as Janet Marshall
- Judith Anderson as Madame Duvier, Marshall's superior
- Boris Karloff as Guibert, an expert at smuggling deserters out of France
- Sam Jaffe as Schiller, a German grocer in France
- Robert Coote as Sgt. Beggs

== Production ==
Robert Stevens was the director. David Davidson wrote the teleplay based on Maurice Edelman's novel of the same title.

To the Sound of Trumpets aired on a Tuesday evening, the first installment of Playhouse 90 after it ceased airing on a regular basis in its traditional time slot on Thursdays at 9:30 p.m.

== Reviews ==
Fred Danzig of the UPI wrote that it was "filled with clinkers in acting, plot and technical details" and was often repetitious, yet it provided "some curiously gripping, moving moments" focusing on one man's responsibility to his fellow man. Danzig found Hart's performance to be "consistently excellent". On the other hand, he wrote that Karloff's performance appeared to be a satire of old Boris Karloff movies.

Cynthia Lowry of the Associated Press found it entertaining and wrote that Playhouse 90, even in its new time slot, "remains one of television's enduring delights."

Another reviewer wrote that the production "has a tendency to ramble, but it contains some strong scenes and the message, which, while not new, bears repetition."
