= The Silver Whistle (Playhouse 90) =

- Playhouse 90 episode
- Episode no.: Season 4 Episode 7
- Directed by: Franklin Schaffner
- Written by: Robert McEnroe
- Original air date: December 24, 1959

Episode chronology
← Previous "The Tunnel"	Next → "A Dream of Treason"

"The Silver Whistle" was an American television play broadcast live on December 24, 1959, as part of the CBS television series, Playhouse 90. It was the seventh episode of the fourth season of Playhouse 90 and the 124th episode overall.

== Plot ==
The play concerns a charming vagabond who arrives at an old people's home and brings new life to the home's residents.

== Cast ==
- Eddie Albert as the charming vagabond
- Arthur Hughes as an "old man with young ideas"
- Joseph Sweeney as a "more conservative companion"
- Doro Merande as a "prophet of doom"
- Margaret Hamilton as an "elderly tippler"
- Enid Markey as a "kittenish spinster"
- Henry Jones as a "philosophizing hobo"
- Bethel Leslie
- Harry Townes
- Zamah Cunningham

== Production ==
Franklin Schaffner was the director, and Robert McEnroe wrote the teleplay based on his stage play, The Silver Whistle.

== Reception ==
The production received a positive review from the New York Daily News which cited the story's "human qualities" and the "appealing performances of Albert, Jones, Leslie, and Merande. Percy Shain of The Boston Globe gave the production a poor review, citing "an incredible story line", "dubious dialogue", and a "distasteful" willingness to ridicule the "foibles" of the elderly.
