= Van Nuys High School =

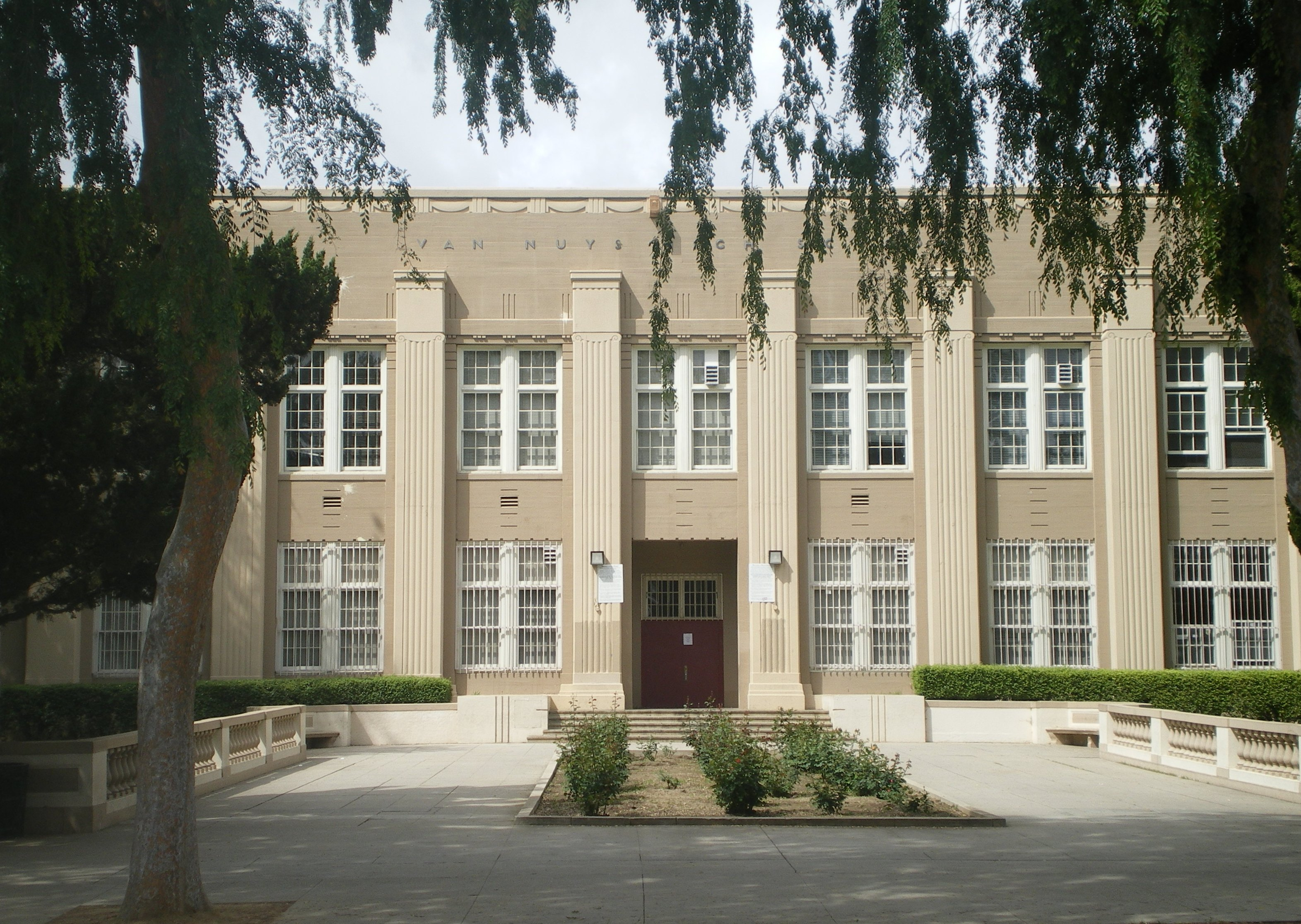

Location
- 6535 Cedros Avenue; Van Nuys, Los Angeles, California 91411; United States; 34.189540°N 118.453586°W

Information
- Type: Public comprehensive high school
- Established: 1914; 112 years ago
- Status: Open
- School district: Los Angeles Unified School District
- NCES District ID: 062271003424
- Principal: Lourdes De-Santiago
- Teaching staff: 113.40 (FTE)
- Enrollment: 2,176 (2023–2024)
- Student to teacher ratio: 19.19
- Colors: Crimson, gray, and white
- Team name: Wolves
- Website: vannuyshs.lausd.org

Van Nuys High School (VNHS) is a public high school in the Van Nuys district of Los Angeles, belonging to the Los Angeles Unified School District: District 2. The school is home to a Residential Program and three Magnet Programs—Math/Science, Performing Arts, and Medical.

Several neighborhoods, including much of Van Nuys, portions of Sherman Oaks, Magnolia Woods, and Victory Park, are zoned to this school.

== History ==
Van Nuys High School opened in 1914, four years after Van Nuys was established. For years the only high schools in the San Fernando Valley were Van Nuys, Owensmouth (now Canoga Park), San Fernando, and North Hollywood. The main buildings and auditorium were built in 1933, incorporating remnants of the 1915 building which had been destroyed in the Long Beach earthquake. The football and track stadium, originally built at the same time as the current high school, is named for Bob Waterfield, and the baseball field for Don Drysdale, the two most famous athletes to have played for VNHS.

It was in the Los Angeles City High School District until 1961, when it merged into LAUSD.

For the 1998–1999 Scholastic Assessment Test (SAT), Van Nuys high had a 537 average on the verbal portion and a 568 on the mathematics portion, giving it the highest SAT scores in the LAUSD that year.

The Los Angeles Unified School District ordered Van Nuys High School to convert to year-round scheduling in 2001, due to such reasons as overcrowding. Even though this relieved the overcrowding at the school, the magnet programs separated tracks, along with the residential students. The Performing Arts Magnet and the Medical Magnet were available only on the A-Track Schedule, while the Math and Science Magnet was available only on the C-Track Schedule. B-Trackers could not take the same classes as C-Trackers, while C-Trackers could take only certain A-Track classes. Teachers that had both A-Track and C-Track students were frustrated because the curriculum had to be synchronized with both tracks.

Van Nuys High School returned to the traditional school calendar in 2005. The switch was caused by a decline in the school population and by a new district policy to eliminate year-round schools whenever possible.

The opening of Panorama High School in October 2006, relieved overcrowding at Van Nuys High School.

Van Nuys High School had the highest AP passing rate in the LAUSD for a second consecutive year in 2014.

Van Nuys High School was indeed established in 1915, although the first graduating ceremony was held in 1914 for a small group of students who had previously attended different schools, legitimately making the class of 2014 The Centennials. The issue was discussed between high authority figures of the school, and they decided that even though the first graduating ceremony that took place for students who did attend Van Nuys High School was in the year 1915, the first graduating ceremony to take place in the school took place back in 1914.

== Extracurricular activities ==
Van Nuys has a range of extracurricular teams. Its Science Olympiad team has consistently placed in the top 6 in regional competitions, from 2014 to 2019, even advancing to state competitions several times, such as in 2018. Its Science Bowl team won the national competition in 1995, and has placed highly in regional competitions in the years since.

Van Nuys has a newly created history bowl team as of 2019, and has placed in playoffs in its first year of competing.

== Community Adult School ==
The Adult School is on the same campus as Van Nuys High School. It allows adults as well as high school students to take classes. Most Van Nuys High School students take courses in the Adult School for academic remediation. However, some take classes for Counselor-Identified High School Credit Deficiencies, while others take classes for personal necessities of flexible scheduling.

The Adult School is considered a work-at-your-own-pace program. A student can finish an entire course in just 2–3 weeks, but can take longer depending on the work effort of the student.

== Athletics ==
Van Nuys High has a variety of sports including: basketball, baseball, softball, volleyball, football, flag football, soccer, golf, wrestling, water polo, swimming and tennis.

== Incidents ==
=== 2023 brawl & stabbing ===
On November 1, 2023, a brawl on the school's campus occurred around 11 a.m. local time, involving 11 students. During this brawl, a student stabbed two students with a sharp weapon in their possession. Two additional students sustained additional injuries requiring medical attention, with none of the four in fatal conditions. Los Angeles Unified School District superintendent Alberto M. Carvalho retracted a policy which prohibited school police from leaving a constant presence on campus as a result of the incident.

== Notable alumni ==
- Paula Abdul (born 1962), entertainer
- George O. Abell (1927-1983) astronomer, professor
- Diane Baker (born 1938), actress
- Larry Banner, gymnast
- Harry Browne (attended Van Nuys 1946), author and Libertarian presidential nominee in 1996 and 2000
- Julie Brown (born 1958), entertainer
- Chuck Cecil (1922-2019), disc jockey
- Vint Cerf (born 1943), computer scientist
- Stephen M. Cohen (born 1948), internet entrepreneur
- José Cortez (born 1975), NFL football player
- Steve Crocker (born 1944), computer scientist
- Kim Darby (born 1948), actress
- Dorothy DeBorba (1925-2010), actress
- Larry Dixon (born 1966), NHRA drag car champion
- James Dougherty (1921-2005), police officer and first husband of Marilyn Monroe
- Tony Dow (1945-2022), actor
- Don Drysdale (1936-1993), baseball pitcher
- Erika Eleniak (born 1969), actress
- David Gerrold (born 1944), writer
- Joseph Gordon-Levitt (born 1981), actor
- Jack Hirsch (born c. 1941), basketball player
- Al Hoisington (born 1933), football player
- Dennis Holt (born 1942), linguist and poet
- Steve Kanaly (born 1946), actor
- Stacy Keach (born 1941), actor
- David Klein, creator of Jelly Belly candies
- Bruce Kovner (born 1945), financier, former hedge fund manager
- Scott Mason (1959-2015), disc jockey
- Bob McChesney (1926-2002), football player
- Geri McGee (1936-1982), model, showgirl, wife of mobster Frank "Lefty" Rosenthal
- Norm Miller (born 1946), baseball player
- Marilyn Monroe (1926-1962), actress
- Jon Postel (1943-1998), computer scientist
- Don Prudhomme (born 1941), drag racer
- Al Qöyawayma (born 1938), sculptor and engineer
- Thano Rama (born 1945), actor
- Robert Redford (1936–2025), actor
- Ricardo Rodriguez (born 1986), professional wrestler and ring announcer
- Ted Robbins (born 1952), radio journalist
- Jane Russell (1921-2011), actress
- Johnny Sanders (1922–1990), NFL general manager
- John K. Singlaub (1921-2022), Major General, US Army
- David J. Skorton (born 1949), secretary (CEO) of Smithsonian Institution and academic
- Shawn Steel (born 1946), politics
- Bob Waterfield (1920-1983), Pro Football Hall of Fame quarterback and punter
- Alice Waters (born 1944) restaurateur and author
- Natalie Wood (1938-1981), actress

== Filming ==
The campus was used as a location for the 1982 movie Fast Times at Ridgemont High. Ridgemont High's mascot in the movie was the same as Van Nuys High School—a wolf, which remains VNHS's mascot today.

The horror films Christine and Sleepwalkers, both written by Stephen King, were filmed at Van Nuys High School.

Some perhaps less well known movies filmed at Van Nuys High include My Science Project, Kid 'n Play's Class Act and My Stepmother Is an Alien (featuring Kim Basinger) were also filmed at VNHS, as were scenes in the Disney film Starstruck.

In addition, the pilot episode of The Wonder Years and several episodes of Highway to Heaven were filmed there, as was The Ramones' punk-rock movie classic Rock 'n' Roll High School.

The music video of Vitamin C's Graduation song was filmed at Van Nuys High School. An episode of Apple's Way 1974–1975 Vince Van Patten was filmed on the football field. An episode of Scrubs was filmed on the track field. An episode of 7th Heaven was filmed there as well, as was an episode of Twin Peaks. The 2009 film Love at First Hiccup was also filmed at the front of the school and in the school's quad.

A 2009 music video "About a Girl" by The Academy Is... was also filmed in Van Nuys High School. Also, several episodes of the 2010 series Parenthood were shot in the school's library and quad area.

VNHS was used as the location for many of the scenes in the '80s TV series The White Shadow.

The 2014 music video for the song "Unlimited" made by the clothing company Old Navy was filmed at Van Nuys High School.

From 2015 to 2017, the sitcom television series Those Who Can't filmed at Van Nuys High School, using the campus as the location of Smoot High School, a fictional school in Denver, Colorado.

Young Sheldon is filmed at Van Nuys High School.

The 2020 adaptation of the film Valley Girl was filmed at Van Nuys High School.

In 2022, The HBO limited series Winning Time introduced dancer Paula Abdul on the football field of Van Nuys High School.
