= Lawman (TV series) =

American Western television series (1958–1962)

- Lawman opening credits
- Genre: Western
- Starring: John Russell; Peter Brown; Peggie Castle
- Theme music composer: Mack David (lyrics); Jerry Livingston
- Composers: John Rarig; William Lava; David Buttolph
- Country of origin: United States
- Original language: English
- No. of seasons: 4
- No. of episodes: 156 (list of episodes)

Production
- Executive producer: William T. Orr
- Producers: Jules Schermer; Oren W. Haglund (Production manager); Gordon Bau (make-up)
- Camera setup: Single-camera
- Running time: 25 minutes
- Production company: Warner Bros. Television

Original release
- Network: ABC
- Release: October 5, 1958 – June 24, 1962

Related
- Maverick; Sugarfoot

Lawman is an American Western television series originally telecast on ABC from 1958 to 1962, starring John Russell as Marshal Dan Troop and Peter Brown as Deputy Marshal Johnny McKay. The series was set in Laramie, Wyoming, during 1879 and the 1880s. Warner Bros. already had several Western series on the air at the time.

Prior to the beginning of production, Russell, Brown, and producer Jules Schermer made a pact to maintain the quality of the series so that it would not be seen as "just another Western". At the start of season two, Russell and Brown were joined by Peggie Castle as Lily Merrill, the owner of the Birdcage Saloon, and a love interest for Dan.

The main sponsor of the series was the R. J. Reynolds Tobacco Company through their Camel cigarettes brand. The alternate sponsor was General Mills. The two main stars did spots endorsing Camel cigarettes and Cheerios breakfast cereal.

== Premise ==
Dan Troop leaves Abilene, Kansas, for the town of Laramie, Wyoming. He is offered the town marshal's job after the previous marshal, David Lemp, is murdered. On the way into town, he meets Johnny McKay, who is placing a tombstone on Lemp's grave. Johnny mistakes Dan for a crook, but they meet again at the cafe owned by Lemp's widow, Dru (Bek Nelson), where Johnny works as a dishwasher. Dan puts a sign in the window of the marshal's office that reads, "Deputy Wanted".

Johnny applies for the job, but Dan turns him down, believing that 19-year-old Johnny is too young. Dan later comes across Lacey Hawks (Edd Byrnes) in the Bluebonnet Saloon. Lacey tries to coax Dan into a gunfight, but Dan arrests him, instead. Lacey promises Dan that his two brothers Flynn (Jack Elam) and Walt (Lee Van Cleef) will come after him. Johnny tells Dan that Flynn is the one who killed Marshal Lemp; the whole town saw him do it, but they were too afraid to stand up to him. He again volunteers to help Dan take them down, but Troop refuses. Johnny tells him that he cannot take both Hawks brothers alone. Dan goes out to face them, anyway. Dan shoots Flynn, but then hears another shot from behind him. Dan sees Walt fall dead, and then turns around to see Johnny with a rifle in his hand. Dan motions for Johnny to follow him back into the office and then takes down the "Deputy Wanted" sign.

During the course of season one, Troop teaches Johnny the fundamentals of law enforcement. Frequently, while Troop is pursuing outlaws, Johnny remains behind to guard the town. In seasons two through four, Johnny becomes more involved in the action and carries some entire episodes by himself (such as in the season-three episode "Chantay" and season-four episode "The Youngest"). During season one, the episodes maintain a serious tone, but when Lily arrives at the start of season two, the scripts begin incorporating some comedic elements that lighten the tone, as well as some elements of romance, as Dan Troop and Lily Merrill's friendship grows. Johnny always addressed Marshal Dan Troop as "Mr. Troop" or "Sir" throughout the series run. Throughout season one, Troop usually called Johnny "Boy" with a tone indicating that it was aimed at Johnny's age; as the series progressed, Troop called Johnny by name more often than not, and only occasionally called him "Boy", though now with a tone indicating it was a term of friendship.

== Cast ==
=== Main ===
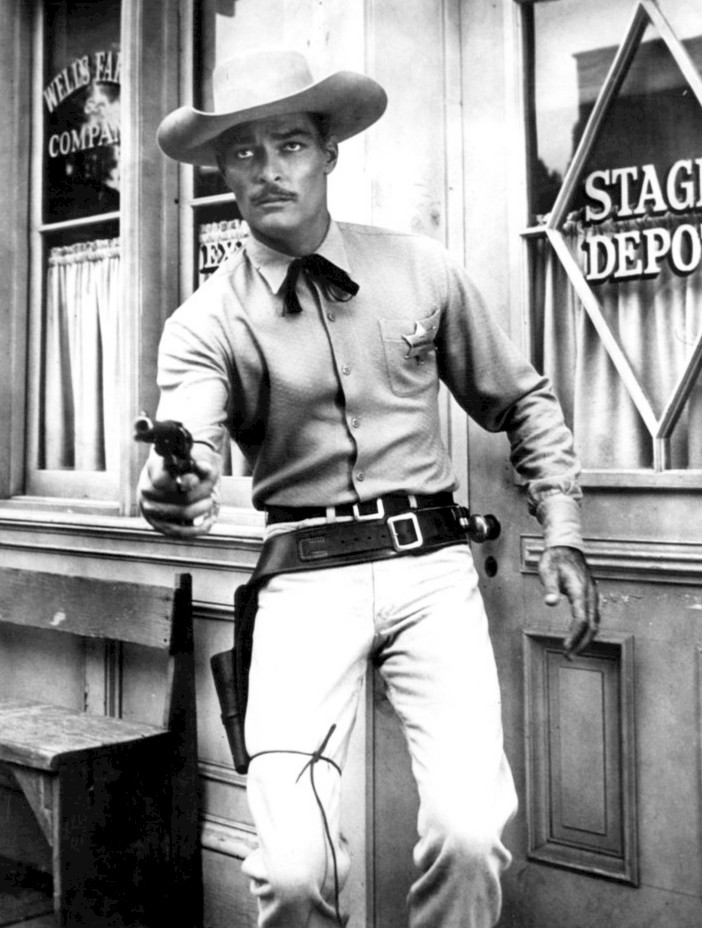
John Russell as Dan Troop

Dan Troop, played by John Russell, is the town marshal of Laramie. Russell based the character on an officer that he knew in the United States Marine Corps. Dan is a hardnosed, by-the-book, seasoned lawman, who is quick with a gun, and also good with his fists. Russell, who was 37 years old when he got the part, theorized that Dan would have to be older to have this much experience as a lawman. After the third episode, Russell had white streaks added to his hair to make him appear older. In addition to being marshal, Dan was both a mentor and friend to his deputy, Johnny McKay. According to Peter Brown on his website, Dan and Johnny's relationship mirrored the relationship that he had with Russell. While Dan was teaching Johnny how to be a lawman, Russell was teaching Brown how to be an actor. Dan also had a romantic relationship with saloon owner Lily Merrill. Dan cared for Lily very deeply, but his job often thwarted their happiness. He had one brother, Clay Troop, played by James Drury, four years before the premiere of The Virginian. Clay Troop was killed in the season-one episode, "The Gang". It was revealed that the woman Dan loved and wanted to marry, before her death, had instead wed Clay, a gunfighter and an outlaw. Clay said that his wife "couldn't resist trying to reform" him though she had loved Dan a little more. Times occurred when the townspeople would second guess Troop, but he always stuck to his guns and was determined to do the right thing.

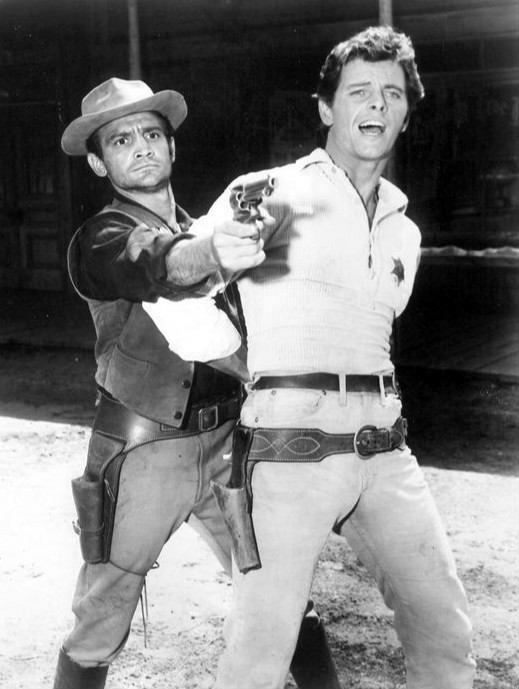
Brown as Johnny McKay

Johnny McKay, played by Peter Brown, is the deputy marshal of Laramie. Dan had been hesitant to hire Johnny as his deputy, because of his young age, but he later proved his worth. Johnny was orphaned at age 10 in Kansas. His father was killed by raiders, and his mother died on a wagon train. The season-one episode "The Joker" dealt with Johnny's origin when an outlaw named Barney Tremain, played by Jeff York in the first of two appearances on the series, rides into Laramie and claims to be Johnny's real father. Whether or not he was telling the truth was not revealed. Johnny was easier going, but he was also brave, extremely fast with a gun, and loyal to Dan, whom he always referred to as "Mr. Troop". He was like a younger brother to Lily. In the first season, Dan many times left Johnny behind when he left Laramie to pursue criminals. In the later years, Johnny got more involved in the action, as Dan began to see him more as a partner in the fight against crime than as his humble apprentice. Johnny actually quit three times. Once was because if Tremain were his father, he thought that meant he had outlaw blood in him. The second time, he thought Dan was taking credit for a kill he made, but he later found out Dan was trying to protect him. The third time, Johnny had to shoot a friend of his and lost his nerve to be a lawman. Somehow, though, he would eventually come back.

Dan's first love interest was Dru Lemp, widow of the previous town marshal. Dan admitted in the first episode he had a previous relationship with a woman who was killed by a stray bullet, midway through the first season.

Later in the first season, Barbara Lang was brought in as Julie Tate, the daughter of Harry Tate, played by Jon Lormer, who was the editor of the town newspaper. Dan and she did not hit it off right away, because she felt he was not doing enough to find her father's killer. After four episodes, Lang's character was not seen again.

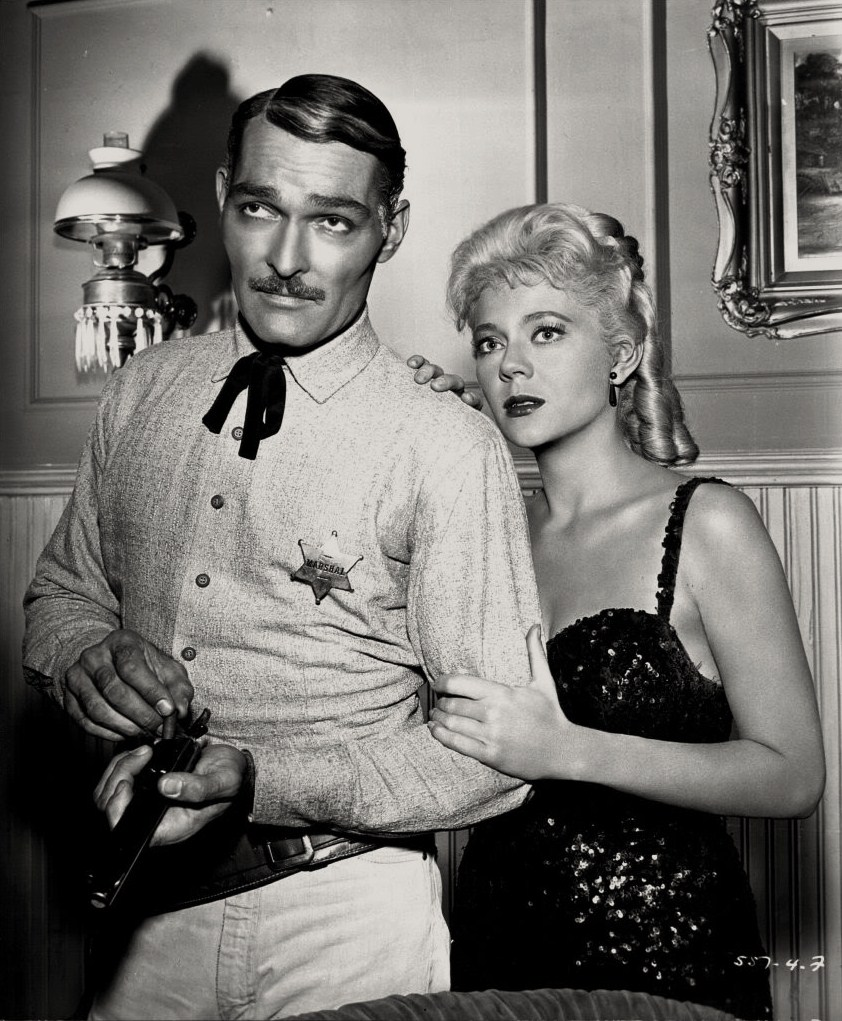
Russell with Peggie Castle, 1962

Lily Merrill (Peggie Castle) then came to town as the owner of the Birdcage Saloon. Lily had been run out of Billings, Montana, by a crooked sheriff. At first, Dan and she thought each other was crooked. After finding out that they were both wrong, they became very close during the remainder of the run of the series. As their relationship grew, Lily often dropped hints about wanting to marry Dan, and he would pretend that he did not hear. Lily was formerly married to outlaw Frank Quinlaven, played by Mike Road in the season--two episode, "The Exchange". They had a son named Tommy, played by Bryan Russell, who lived with her sister. Frank tried to use Tommy as a bargaining chip to get Lily to help him rob the Laramie bank, but Dan stopped him at the last minute. Dan and Johnny often used Lily as a sounding board whenever they had a problem. Lily is beautiful, feisty, courageous, extremely loyal, and occasionally even uses a gun herself to help Dan and Johnny when no one else will. In addition to running her saloon, Lily was also elected the town fire chief and briefly filled in as schoolmarm.

=== Recurring characters ===
- Dru Lemp (Bek Nelson) appeared in eight episodes of season one. She owns a local cafe and is the widow of the previous town marshal, David Lemp.
- Judge Trager (Harry Cheshire) appeared in 15 episodes over all four seasons, with nearly half (six episodes) being in season four. He oversees all of the court cases in Laramie. (Occasionally, other actors had portrayed "a judge", but these judges were never referred to by any other name - in dialogue and closing credits - as "Judge", whereas Cheshire's Judge Trager was always referred to by name.) Judge Trager is a member of the town council and a close friend of Dan's. The character's surname was always spelled "Trager" on his door signs throughout the series and in seasons one to three's closing credits. Beginning in season four, the character's surname was consistently spelled "Traeger" in the closing credits only, in episodes two ("The Juror"), 19 ("The Vintage"), 23 ("The Holdout"), 27 ("Heritage of Hate"), 35 ("The Man Behind the News"), and the final 41 ("The Witness").
- Harry Tate (Jon Lormer) appeared in five episodes in season one as the editor of the town newspaper, the biweekly Laramie Free Press, and a close friend of Dan's. He was killed by mistake when wearing the hat of the intended victim. Tate had a daughter, Julie.
- Julie Tate (Barbara Lang) appeared in four episodes of season one. She takes over as editor for the newspaper after her father was killed.

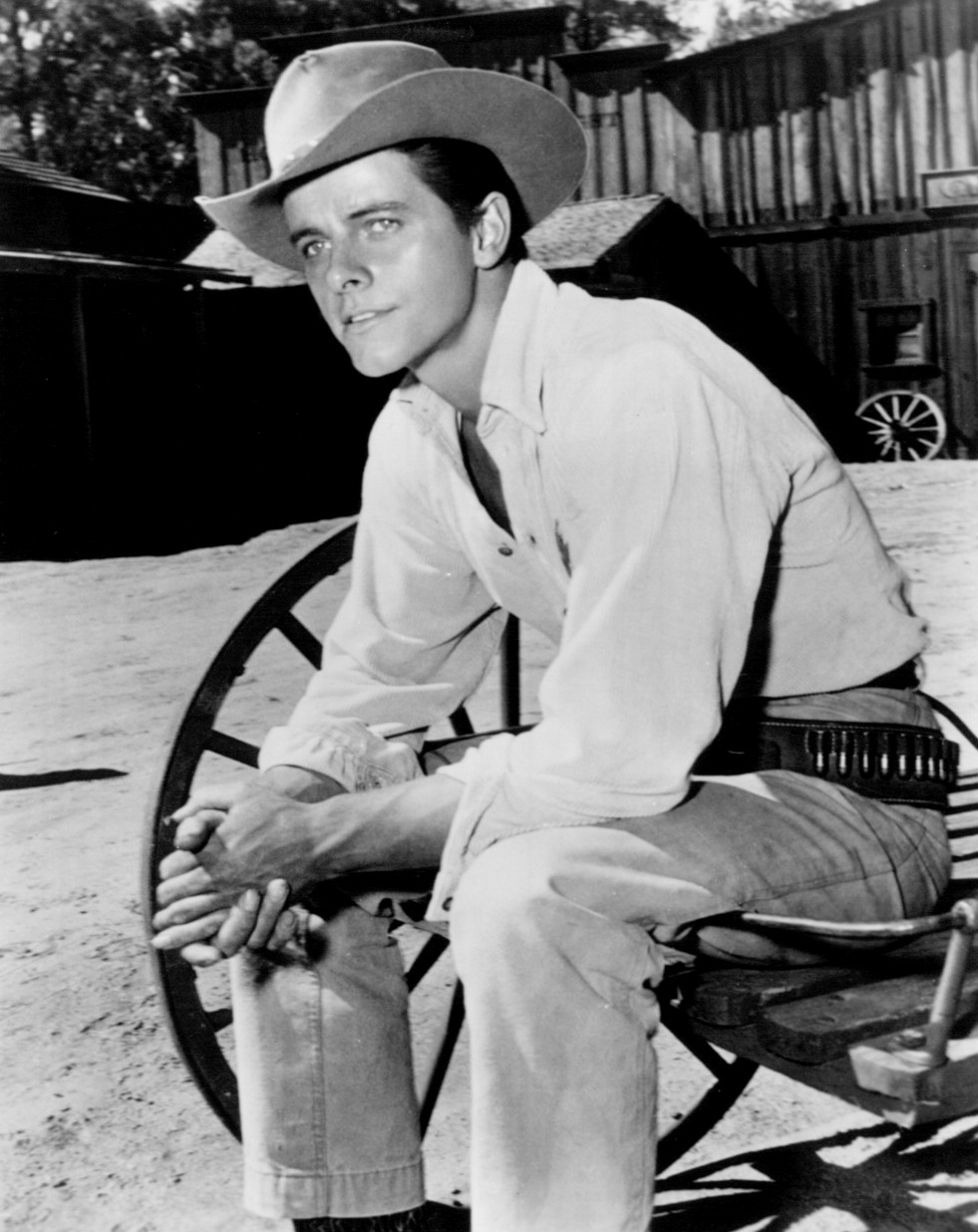
Peter Brown as the deputy

- Tom Pike (Lane Chandler) appeared in four episodes of season one. He is a member of the town council and was constantly second guessing Dan's decisions.
- Hank the Bartender (Emory Parnell) appeared in 11 episodes of the first two seasons. He is the bartender at the Bluebonnet Saloon, a precursor to the Birdcage.
- Doc Stewart, the town physician, is initially portrayed by James Bell and for seven other episodes by Tom Palmer.
- Timmo McQueeney (Clancy Cooper) appeared in 15 episodes in season two. He is Lily's main bartender, a big, burly guy, who talks with a thick Irish accent.
- Jake Summers (Dan Sheridan) appeared in 38 episodes in seasons three and four. Jake became Lily's main bartender, who informs Dan and Johnny if any strangers come into town. Prior to becoming Jake, Sheridan guest-starred twice in two separate roles.
- Owny O'Reilly (Joel Grey) appeared three times in seasons two to four. In the episode "The Salvation of Owny O'Reilly" (April 24, 1960), Grey, at 28, plays the teenager Owny O'Reilly, who is befriended by Deputy McKay. After he finds gold thrown into a well by the partner of his outlaw brother, Owny decides to return the money, but only after coming into the crossfire of the marshal and the outlaws. In time, Owny becomes close friends with Dan and Johnny. In the season-three episode "The Return of Owny O'Reilly", he plays a comical sidekick as Dan's deputy while Johnny is away. Finally, in the season-four episode "Owny O'Reilly, Esq.", Grey's character blunders his way yet again into catching an escaped criminal.
- Jack Stiles (Doodles Weaver) appeared in four episodes of season two as the clerk at the Hotel Laramie and one of Dan and Johnny's informants.
- Oren Slauson (Vinton Hayworth) appeared in nine episodes of seasons two to four. He is the manager of the Laramie Bank, which seemed to get robbed regularly.
- Ben Toomey (Grady Sutton) appeared in 12 episodes of seasons three to four. He took over as clerk at the Hotel Laramie, and like Jack before him, gave Dan and Johnny information on a regular basis.

In the series' next-to-last episode, entitled "The Unmasked" (June 17, 1962), Lawman presents an entirely fictitious portrayal of Boston Corbett, the man who shot and mortally wounded John Wilkes Booth after the assassination of Abraham Lincoln. Played by character actor Dabbs Greer, Corbett is given the name "Joe Brockway" and depicted as a hotel owner in Laramie. In the story line, two former Confederates from Georgia, played by Barry Atwater and Charles Maxwell, arrive in Laramie in search of Brockway, who is the key, they claim, to the settlement of an estate to which they are all a party. Jack Albertson is cast in the episode as a somewhat comical traveling elixir salesman named "Doc" Peters.

=== Guest stars ===
- Steve Pendleton and Lee Van Cleef played deputies Kelsey and Clyde Wilson, respectively, in the episode "Man on a Mountain" (June 12, 1960).
- Vivi Janiss appeared as Alice Welch in "The Visitor", along with Charles Cooper as gunfighter Jack Rollins, Stephen Talbot as Jamie Rollins, Doug McClure as Jed Ryan, and Roscoe Ates as the Old Timer (March 15, 1959).
- DeForest Kelley, five years before Star Trek, was cast as Bent Carr, a greedy ranch foreman, in the episode "Squatters" (January 29, 1961). Carr contributes to the death of his pneumonia-stricken employer by raising the window and removing his cover on a cold night. Armed with power of attorney, he then proceeds to expunge from the ranch lands several farm families who had received permission to settle there by his departed employer. On February 28, 1960, he was cast as Sam White, in "The Thimblerigger", in an earlier episode.
- Sammy Davis Jr., appears in the episode "Blue Boss and Willie Shay" (March 12, 1961) as singing cowboy Willie Shay, who sings part of the Western song, "The Streets of Laredo", also known as "The Cowboy's Lament".
- Peter Breck, formerly of Black Saddle and later of The Big Valley, appears as the arrogant Hale Connors in "Trapped" (September 17, 1961), the first episode of the last season of Lawman. In the story line, Connors places "Plague" warning signs to keep people from entering Laramie while he demands all $150,000 of the assets of the bank as the price for releasing stagecoach passengers being held hostage under threat of death. Marshal Troop devises a plan to thwart Connors and return the money to the bank.
- Robert McQueeney is cast in the episode "Tarot" (December 10, 1961) as Joe Wyatt, an old friend of Lily Merrill's, who arrives at the Birdcage. He reads fortune cards for her friends; all become true, but one suddenly points to death. Wyatt tries to halt a robbery, but is fatally wounded in the attempt.
- Billy Booth appears as a young boy, Tad McCallan, in the episode "The Prodigal Mother" (December 17, 1961). Tad's birth mother, now the married Margaret Coleson, played by Catherine McLeod, returns to Laramie to reclaim him legally from his foster parents, who are poor, hardworking farmers. When Tad tells Mrs. Coleson that she is his mother, but not his "maw", she decides to leave the boy with the McCallans, but agrees to keep in contact with him.
- Lyle Talbot in the episode "By the Book" (December 24, 1961) plays Orville Luster, an overbearing assistant to the territorial marshal, who arrives in Laramie questioning Dan Troop's methods of law enforcement. Troop makes a decision to release two drunken patrons of the Birdcage against Luster's recommendation, and the results are unexpected. Luster soon turns into an admirer of Troop's because the two drunks save Luster's life from an attack by others. Walter Burke appears in a comical role as Ernie.
- Stephen Talbot (Lyle Talbot's son) played Jamie Rollins in the 1959 episode, "The Visitor". (He is perhaps best known for his role as Gilbert Bates in Leave it to Beaver).
- Marie Windsor in the episode "The Wanted Man" (April 8, 1962) portrays Ann Jesse, a woman who dies in childbirth. Her wanted husband, Frank (Dick Foran), orders their grown son, Ben (Jan Stine) to turn him into Marshal Dan Troop to collect the $5,000 reward to have the means to rear his infant brother. Meanwhile, Troop encounters Joe Street (Alan Baxter), a bounty hunter seeking the same reward.

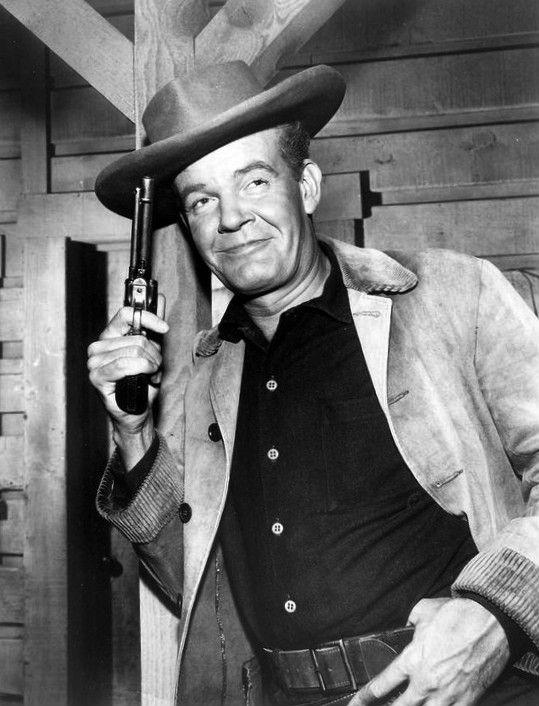
Andrew Duggan in Lawman

- Andrew Duggan appeared several times on Lawman, including the part of Frank Boone in "Sunday" (April 15, 1962). In the story line, Boone desperately demands that he be allowed to take a young outlaw, Billy Deal (Richard Evans), to Montana Territory, where Boone can receive amnesty for his own past crimes in return for bringing Deal to the gallows. At great risk to himself, Marshal Troop is determined to send Deal on the Sunday train to answer for another crime in Casper.
- Olive Carey delivers a noteworthy performance as a bullying mother, "Ma" Martin, of three grown sons in the episode "The Youngest" (April 22, 1962). In the story line, Mrs. Martin pushes her sons, particularly the youngest, Jim Martin Jr. (Joseph Gallison), to take revenge on Marshal Troop for the rightful shooting death of their father, who pulled a gun while involved in a crooked poker game. Jim, however, decides to stand up to his mother upon realizing that his father provoked the shooting.
- Kevin Hagen and Harry Carey Jr., appeared as estranged brothers in the episode "Cort" (April 29, 1962). In the story line, Cort Evers (Hagen) seeks revenge against his brother Mitch (Carey), whom he mistakenly blames for betraying six Union Army prisoners from their hometown during the American Civil War. Mitch is compelled to confront Cort in a shootout, during which he explains that Cort himself, under the influence of a fever, had been who betrayed the prisoners. Cort faints to the ground as he remembers the startling truth of the betrayal.

Other guest stars:

- John Agar
- Chris Alcaide
- Fred Aldrich
- Jimmy Baird
- Rayford Barnes
- Baynes Barron
- Don "Red" Barry
- Whit Bissell
- Joe Brooks
- King Calder
- John Carradine
- Spencer Chan
- Lon Chaney Jr.
- John Cliff
- Ray Danton
- Troy Donahue
- Burt Douglas
- Jack Elam
- Donald Elson
- Chad Everett
- Louise Fletcher
- Dean Fredericks
- Robert Fuller
- Richard Garland
- Coleen Gray
- Robert 'Buzz' Henry
- Chuck Hicks
- Rex Holman
- Skip Homeier
- Clyde Howdy
- Arch Johnson
- I. Stanford Jolley
- Warren J. Kemmerling
- George Kennedy
- Martin Landau
- Charles Lane
- Lyle Latell
- Nolan Leary
- Suzanne Lloyd
- Karl Lukas
- Ken Lynch
- Tyler MacDuff
- Strother Martin
- Ken Mayer
- Joyce Meadows
- Jo Morrow
- Donald Murphy
- Gregg Palmer
- James Parnell
- Wynn Pearce
- Joe Ploski
- Sherwood Price
- Gilman Rankin
- Robert Reed
- Richard Reeves
- Tom Reese
- Joseph Ruskin
- Frank J. Scannell
- William Schallert
- George Selk
- Robert F. Simon
- George Sowards
- Barbara Stuart
- Olive Sturgess
- Kelly Thordsen
- Kenneth Tobey
- Jack Tornek
- Dawn Wells
- Adam West
- Peter Whitney
- Elen Willard
- Van Williams
- Morgan Woodward
- Will Wright
- Tony Young

== Episodes ==
Season	Episodes	Originally released		Rank	Average viewership (in millions)
Season	Episodes	First released	Last released	Rank	Average viewership (in millions)
1	39	October 5, 1958	June 28, 1959	27	11.4
2	37	October 4, 1959	June 19, 1960	15	12.0
3	39	September 18, 1960	June 11, 1961	26	10.5
4	41	September 17, 1961	June 24, 1962	Not in top 30	N/A

== Production ==
Being part of the Warner Bros. array of Westerns, Lawman participated in two crossovers. Russell and Brown appeared in the "Hadley's Hunters" episode of Maverick with Jack Kelly as Bart Maverick. Peter Brown and Adam West also appeared as Johnny McKay and Doc Holliday, respectively, in the Sugarfoot episode "The Trial of the Canary Kid", which was a sequel to the Lawman episode, "The Wayfarer". The premise was that the Canary Kid, Sugarfoot's twin cousin, was in the Laramie jail at the same time as Holliday, and McKay and Holliday were called in to testify accordingly.

The studio routinely recycled scripts through their various series to save money, so that some Lawman plots had been previously seen on other Warner Bros. shows. During a strike by the Writers Guild of America in the spring of 1960, Lawman (and several other WB shows) had their producers lightly rewrite already produced scripts from other shows, crediting the results to "W. Hermanos" (Spanish for W. Brothers). Two Lawman scripts, "The Payment" and "The Judge", were renamed from episodes of Cheyenne and reduced from 60 to 30 minutes; one further Lawman script was also credited to W. Hermanos.

== Release ==
=== Broadcast ===
From October 1958-April 1962, the series aired on ABC, Sunday nights from 8:30-9:00 pm. From April 1962-October 1962, it moved to Sunday nights from 10:30-11:00 pm.

=== Home media ===
Warner Archive has released all four seasons on DVD in Region 1. These are manufacture-on-demand (MOD) releases, available through Warner's online store and Amazon.com.

DVD name	Ep #	Release date
The Complete First Season	39	July 7, 2015
The Complete Second Season	39	August 25, 2015
The Complete Third Season	39	December 1, 2015
The Complete Fourth Season	41	February 2, 2016

== Merchandise ==
Lawman also spawned a variety of merchandise during the run of the series, including lunchboxes, puzzles, boots, arcade cards, sheet music, action figures, toy rifles, and cap pistols. Also, a Lawman comic, drawn by Dan Spiegle, ran for 11 issues (1958–1962).
