= Face of Fire =

- Theatrical release poster
- Directed by: Albert Band
- Screenplay by: Louis Garfinkle
- Based on: The Monster by Stephen Crane
- Produced by: Albert Band; Louis A. Garfinkle
- Starring: Cameron Mitchell; James Whitmore; Bettye Ackerman; Miko Oscard; Royal Dano; Robert F. Simon; Richard Erdman; Howard Smith
- Cinematography: Edward Vorkapich
- Edited by: Ingemar Ejve
- Music by: Erik Nordgren
- Production company: Mardi Gras Productions Inc.
- Distributed by: Allied Artists Pictures
- Release date: August 9, 1959
- Running time: 79 minutes
- Countries: United States; Sweden
- Language: English

Face of Fire is a 1959 American drama film directed by Albert Band and written by Louis A. Garfinkle. It is based on the 1898 novella The Monster by Stephen Crane. The film stars Cameron Mitchell, James Whitmore, Bettye Ackerman, Miko Oscard, Royal Dano, Robert F. Simon, Richard Erdman and Howard Smith. The film was released on August 9, 1959, by Allied Artists Pictures.

It has been called "one of the more Lewtonesque American horror films of 1959" and "essential viewing for Lewton fans... a touching and heartfelt film that trascends the genre it was marketed for."

== Plot ==
Monk Johnson is a well liked village handyman. He heroically saves a doctor's son from a house fire but in the process his face is horribly disfigured. He is then ostracized and considered a monster.

== Cast ==
- Cameron Mitchell as Ned Trescott
- James Whitmore as Monk Johnson
- Bettye Ackerman as Grace Trescott
- Miko Oscard as Jimmie Trescott
- Royal Dano as Jake Winter
- Robert F. Simon as Judge Hagenthorpe
- Richard Erdman as Al Williams
- Howard Smith as Sheriff Nolan
- Lois Maxwell as Ethel Winter
- Jill Donohue as Bella Kovac
- Harold Kasket as Reifsnyder
- Aletha Orr as Martha
- Charles Fawcett as Citizen in Barbershop
- Vernon Young
- Robert Trebor as Dr. John
- Doreen Denning as Kate
- Lorena Holmin as Carrie
- Hjördis Petterson as Mrs. Kovac

== Production ==
Albert Band had written the script for Red Badge of Courage (1951) based on the novel by Stephen Crane and wanted to make a film of Crane’s short story “The Monster.” He found some finance in Stockholm, Sweden and decided to make the film there. Most of the lead cast were imported from Hollywood. They included Richard Erdman who recalled:

Shooting a movie in Sweden was surprisingly the same sort of thing as shooting in Hollywood, except they had longer lunches. [Production] would start mid-morning and go ’til about one, and then knock off for a couple of hours, and then come back and shoot ’til like 11 o’clock at night. About half of the Swedish people working on the movie spoke fairly good English, of course, almost none of us [Americans] spoke Swedish. But we didn’t have a language problem that I remember.

== Reception ==
Variety called it "dull and ponderous".

== See also ==
- List of American films of 1959
