= Goin, Tennessee =

Unincorporated community in Tennessee, US

Coordinates: 36°25′24″N 83°43′20″W

Goin is an unincorporated community in Claiborne County, Tennessee. It is located near State Route 33 west of Tazewell.

The community was named after the local Goin family (a variant spelling of the surname is "Goins").

== Notable people ==
- Spider Johnson, NFL player, was born in Goin in 1907.
- Bek Nelson, actress
