= A Dream of Treason =

- Playhouse 90 episode
- Episode no.: Season 4 Episode 8
- Directed by: Robert Stevens
- Written by: David Davidson
- Original air date: January 21, 1960

Guest appearances
- Richard Basehart as Martin Lambert; Leora Dana as Eleanor Lambert; John Williams as Walter Ferguson; Susan Oliver as Valerie Ferguson; Alexander Scourby as Barragrave; John Hoyt as Andrews

Episode chronology
| ← Previous "The Silver Whistle" | Next → "To the Sound of Trumpets" |

"A Dream of Treason" is an American television play broadcast on January 21, 1960, as part of the CBS television series, Playhouse 90. It is the eighth episode of the fourth season of Playhouse 90 and the 125th episode overall.

== Plot ==
The story concerns a State Department officer, Martin Lambert, who is accused of betraying his county after he receives a secret order to leak confidential policy paper as part of a secret diplomatic maneuver. When the persons who gave the secret order are involved in a plane crash, Lambert finds himself on his own.

== Cast ==
- Richard Basehart as Martin Lambert
- Leora Dana as Eleanor Lambert
- John Williams as Walter Ferguson
- Susan Oliver as Valerie Ferguson
- Alexander Scourby as Barragrave
- John Hoyt as Andrews

== Production ==
Robert Stevens was the director. David Davidson wrote the teleplay based on Maurice Edelman's novel of the same title.

"A Dream of Treason" was the last regularly scheduled episode of Playhouse 90 in its regular Thursday evening time slot. Due to poor ratings, it aired thereafter only as a "special" in varying time period.

== Reception ==
The show's audience percentage had dropped to half of what it had been the previous year.

Fred Danzig of the UPI praised the performances of Scourby and Basehart, but criticized the "theatrical aura around what should have been reality" and several "melodramatic, shadow-filled, slow-talking scenes."
