= The Cruel Day =

10th episode of the 4th season of Playhouse 90

- Playhouse 90 episode
- Episode no.: Season 4 Episode 10
- Directed by: Franklin Schaffner
- Written by: Reginald Rose
- Original air date: February 24, 1960
- Running time: 88 minutes

Guest appearances
- Van Heflin as the captain; Cliff Robertson as Lt. Carvet; Phyllis Thaxter as the captain's wife; Charles Bronson as Sgt. Meras; Nehemiah Persoff as the prisoner's father; Raymond Massey as Father Ruquoi; Peter Lorre as a cafe owner; Miko Oscard as Michel, the captain's son; Thano Rama as Yazid Boussena, the prisoner

Episode chronology
← Previous "To the Sound of Trumpets"	Next → "Tomorrow"

"The Cruel Day" is an American television play broadcast on February 24, 1960, as part of the CBS television series, Playhouse 90. It is the tenth episode of the fourth season of Playhouse 90 and the 127th episode overall.

== Plot ==
A French Army captain arrives with his wife and son at an outpost in a small town in Algeria during the Algerian War. Upon his arrival, rebels stage bomb a house, resulting in the massacre of a local family. The French forces capture a rebel courier, a handsome and intelligent 15-year old boy. When a lieutenant recommends torturing the boy to elicit information on the rebels, the captain faces a crisis of conscience. He debates the dilemma with himself, the prisoner, the prisoner's father, a priest, his wife, and his fellow soldiers. Frustrated at the captain's indecision, the lieutenant fails to act and allows a sniper to shoot and kill the captain.

== Cast ==
- Van Heflin as the captain
- Cliff Robertson as Lt. Carvet
- Phyllis Thaxter as Nicole, the captain's wife
- Charles Bronson as Sgt. Meras
- Nehemiah Persoff as the prisoner's Algerian father
- Raymond Massey as Father Ruquoi
- Peter Lorre as a cafe owner
- Miko Oscard as Michel, the captain's son
- Thano Rama as Yazid Boussena, the prisoner

== Production ==
Herbert Brodkin was the producer. Franklin Schaffner was the director, and Reginald Rose wrote the teleplay.

The production was Lorre's first role after being away from television for a year due to a health incident that Lorre described as sun stroke.

== Reviews ==
Harry Harris in The Philadelphia Inquirer described it as "a stunning drama that helped regain for 'Playhouse 90' much of its onetime luster." Harris also praised Schaffner's direction and Brodkin's overall production as "beyond reproach".

Larry Wolters of the Chicago Tribune called it "a sensitive, moving, and suspenseful drama."

Fred Danzig of the UPI praised the cast as excellent and opined that its treatment of profound questions made the play "one of unusual importance."
