= Chuck Cecil (broadcaster) =

American radio personality

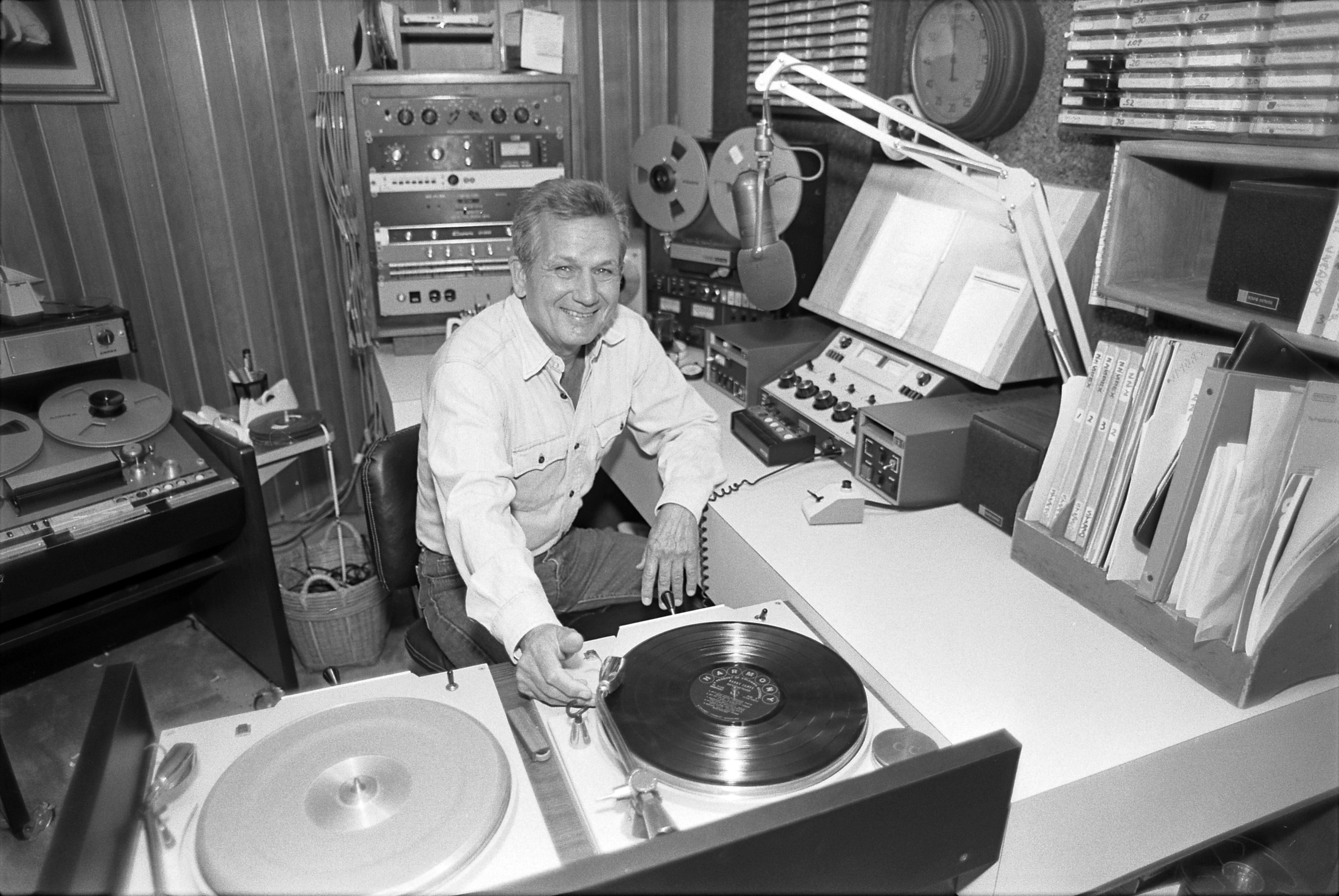
Cecil in 1986

Chuck Cecil (December 26, 1922 – April 30, 2019) was a veteran Los Angeles radio broadcaster and longtime host of the syndicated program "The Swingin' Years", a "Best of" radio show for the "big band" era in music, which lasted from 1935 to 1955.

== Early years ==
Cecil was born and raised on an Oklahoma ranch. A severe drought during the Great Depression forced Chuck's family west, to Los Angeles, California, where they settled in the San Fernando Valley. There, Cecil attended Van Nuys High School alongside future actresses Jane Russell and Marilyn Monroe (who went by the name Norma Jeane Baker at the time). Cecil was a guest at Monroe's wedding to Jim Dougherty in 1942.

That same year, Cecil landed his first radio job at KVEC in San Luis Obispo, California. By December, he had been called to active duty by the Navy. Cecil was accepted for the Navy's V-5 pilot training program, flying for Grumman. When the war ended, Chuck was serving in a replacement squad waiting for his first combat assignment which never came.

After the war, Chuck went back to radio. where he found a job at KFLW in Klamath Falls, Oregon. While working as an announcer for "Baldy's Band", a popular orchestra in Southern Oregon, Cecil met his future bride, Edna Brown. She had been working as the band's vocalist. The couple wed in 1947 and have four children and 15 grandchildren.

Cecil was hired by Los Angeles radio station KFI in 1952, where he remained for the next 21 years until 1973, when KFI made a format change, causing Cecil to leave the station. Cecil later spent most of the 1970s and 80s working at radio stations KGIL-AM and KPRZ, both in Los Angeles.

From the 1960s to the 1980s, Chuck Cecil broadcast a show called "Big Band Countdown" on the American Forces Network (AFRTS).

== The Swingin' Years ==
While working at KFI, Cecil pitched the idea of a Big Band oriented radio show to the station's management; they agreed. So in June 1956, "The Swingin' Years" went on the air for the first time.

The concept was simple: "The Swingin' Years" perpetuates the memory of swing music, popularized by such acts as Glenn Miller, Benny Goodman, Artie Shaw, Tommy Dorsey and Duke Ellington. The program focused primarily on Swing, but also included many of the popular ballads of the era that topped the record charts from 1935 to 1955, that Cecil calls "The Swingin' Years". The music played on the program originally came from KFI's vast record library, as well as from Cecil's personal collection of 40,000+ 78 rpm records. As the show progressed, Cecil included audio clips of his interviews with some of the brightest stars of the big band era.

"The Swingin' Years" began as a local Los Angeles show in 1956, but by 1973, Cecil began syndicating the program through American Radio Programs, Incorporated. During its peak, the show aired on hundreds of radio stations across the United States, in Europe and on the Armed Forces Radio Network. During its first three decades the show proved popular with members of the World War II generation, but by the late 1980s, that generation had begun to die off, as did the number of stations carrying a Big Band format. "The Swingin' Years" has enjoyed a renaissance of sorts over the past decade among younger people interested in swing music and swing dancing. Recently, "The Swingin' Years" has aired on a number of listener supported public radio stations across the United States. With the emergence of the internet, fans worldwide have sent contributions to keep "The Swinging Years" on public radio, and, by extension, streaming on the Internet.

Cecil produced "The Swingin' Years" from his home in Ventura, California, where he moved from the San Fernando Valley in 2002, utilizing "a massive library of more than 30,000 78-, 45- and 33-rpm records, and his own personal library of interviews with 356 band leaders, singers and sidemen..." In June 2013, the show celebrated its 57th anniversary of existence.

"The Swingin' Years" was heard on Sunday nights, from 8 pm to midnight, Eastern Time, on WPPB, broadcasting from the Hamptons on Long Island, New York. Although Chuck's program was once heard on "some 30 stations across the United States..." and "on the Armed Forces Radio Network," WPPB was "...the only public radio station carrying his show." The program was formerly heard on Saturday and Sunday mornings, from 6 am to 10 am, Pacific Time, on KKJZ, located in Long Beach, California.

According to the late KKJZ deejay Bubba Jackson, "This music is the voice of America and he has documented it. Thanks to Chuck Cecil, that music will never disappear. He is one of the great historians of American culture."

Chuck Cecil's last program on KKJZ was broadcast on February 9, 2014. Cecil broke off his long relationship with the station, citing "repeated technical difficulties producing the show." Starting on February 15, 2014, Cecil's time slots at KKJZ were filled by longtime Los Angeles area disc jockey Johnny Magnus, who discontinued the big band tradition, in favor of pop music, with a program called "Swing Time".

Cecil's last show on WPPB was broadcast on July 3, 2016, when it was announced that this would be his final program.

== Sources ==
- Chuck Cecil at Dancing L.A., accessed 2014-03-05
- Chuck Cecil at Los Angeles Radio People, Where Are They Now? – C, compiled by Don Barrett, accessed 2013-11-08
