= Armstrong Circle Theatre =

American anthology drama television series

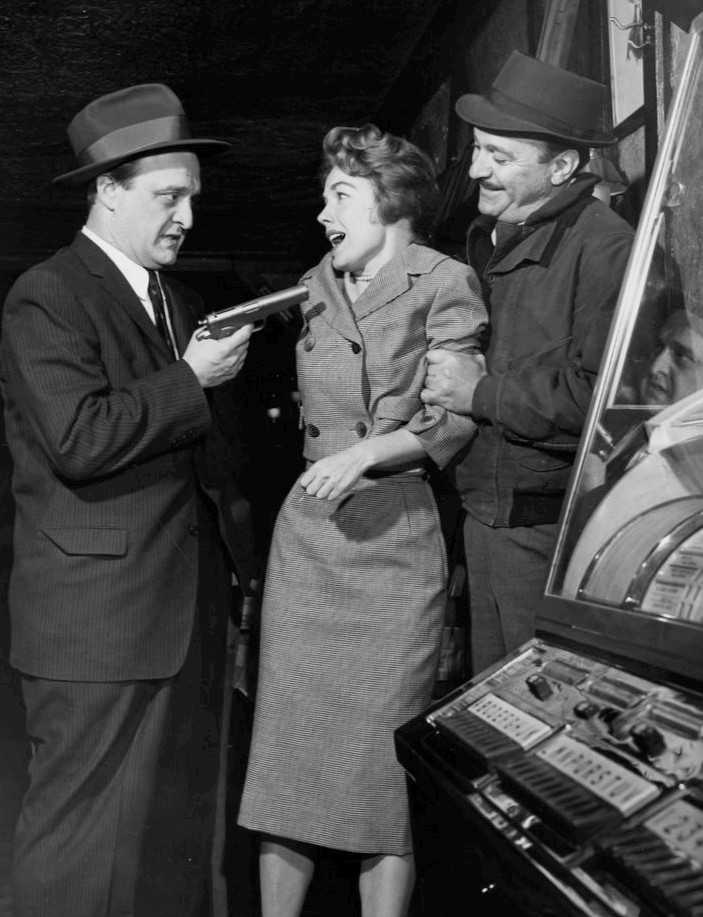
- Armstrong Circle Theatre – Sound of Violence 1959.
- Genre: Anthology drama
- Presented by: Nelson Case (1950–1951); Joe Ripley; (1952–1953); Bob Sherry; (1953–1954); Sandy Becker (1954–1955); John Cameron Swayze (1955–1957); Douglas Edwards (1957–1961); Ron Cochran (1961–1962); Henry Hamilton (1962–1963)
- Composers: Harold Levey; Will Schaefer
- Country of origin: United States
- Original language: English
- No. of seasons: 14
- No. of episodes: 370

Production
- Executive producer: David Susskind (1954–1960)
- Producers: Selig Alkon; Jacqueline Babbin; Robert Costello; Hudson Faucett; George Lowther; Ralph Nelson; Henry Salomon; George Simpson; David Susskind
- Running time: 30 mins. (1950–1955); 60 mins. (1955–1963)

Original release
- Network: NBC (1950–1957); CBS (1957–1963)
- Release: June 6, 1950 – June 5, 1963

Armstrong Circle Theatre is an American anthology drama television series which ran from June 6, 1950, to June 25, 1957, on NBC, and from October 2, 1957, to August 28, 1963, on CBS. It alternated weekly with The United States Steel Hour. It finished in the Nielsen ratings at number 19 for the 1950–51 season and number 24 for 1951–52. The principal sponsor was Armstrong World Industries.

Between July 8 and September 16, 1959, CBS aired reruns of six documentary dramas originally broadcast during the 1958–1959 season as episodes of Armstrong Circle Theatre under the title Armstrong by Request. Armstrong by Request aired during Armstrong Circle Theatre′s time slot and also alternated with The United States Steel Hour.

== Synopsis ==
The program's first season featured episodes that tried "to please every body in a mass audience, using only highly formularized plays. The next season brought a different approach, with more emphasis on characters than on plot. Edward B. Roberts worked with writers from all over the United States to find scripts. By mid-November 1952, he estimated that he had talked to 3,000 writers and looked at 20,000 scripts. Authors received $750 for each accepted script.

The series featured original dramas by noted writers, although sometimes comedies were shown. Its guidelines specifically called for the avoidance of violence. Originally a half-hour production, in 1955 the show expanded to an hour and began to emphasize dramatized versions of real-life contemporary events (including the sinking of the SS Andrea Doria) and a documentary on the history of Communism in the Soviet Union. Upon moving to CBS, the show emphasized several Cold War topics, including espionage, Radio Free Europe and escapes from East Germany.

David Susskind, producer of the program, called the new episodes "actuals", describing them as "dramatizations based on truth".

== Hosts and narrators ==
- Nelson Case (1950–1951)
- Joe Ripley (1952–1953)
- Bob Sherry (1953–1954)
- Sandy Becker (1954–1955)
- John Cameron Swayze (1955–1957)
- Douglas Edwards (1957–1961)
- Ron Cochran (1961–1962)
- Henry Hamilton (1962–1963)

== Guest stars ==
The series featured numerous guest stars including:

- Tige Andrews
- Edward Asner
- Anne Bancroft
- Ed Begley
- Barbara Britton
- James Broderick
- John Cassavetes
- Dabney Coleman
- Jackie Cooper
- James Dean
- Patty Duke
- Robert Duvall
- Peter Falk
- Geraldine Fitzgerald
- Nina Foch
- Wallace Ford
- Alan Furlan
- Jonathan Harris
- Hurd Hatfield
- Grace Kelly
- Jack Klugman
- Otto Kruger
- Cloris Leachman
- Jack Lemmon
- Julie London
- Audra Lindley
- Gene Lockhart
- Karl Malden
- Walter Matthau
- Roddy McDowell
- Darren McGavin
- Patrick McVey
- Elizabeth Montgomery
- Rosemary Murphy
- Paul Newman
- Lois Nettleton
- Leslie Nielsen
- Carroll O'Connor
- Susan Oliver
- Miko Oscard
- Anthony Perkins
- Lee Remick
- Jason Robards
- Cliff Robertson
- Gena Rowlands
- Telly Savalas
- George Segal
- Martin Sheen
- Kim Stanley
- Maureen Stapleton
- Harold J. Stone
- Suzanne Storrs
- Beatrice Straight
- Ron Thompson
- Jo Van Fleet
- Eli Wallach
- Jack Whiting
- Gene Wilder
- Joanne Woodward

== Directors ==
- Paul Bogart
- William Corrigan
- Marc Daniels
- Robert Ellis Miller
- Robert Mulligan
- Daniel Petrie
- Ted Post
- James Sheldon
- Garry Simpson
- Robert Stevens

== International broadcast and streaming ==
The series didn't air internationally until June 4, 2007 when Telecapri News aired the first 10 seasons of the show and on Telecapri with the 11th, 12th and 13th season until December 29, 2016 and with repeats both on Telecapri Sport until January 17, 2018 and on the same network until April 12, 2024, all with Italian subtitles in Italy. It is also known as "Teatro di Armstrong".

The success of the Italian broadcast on Telecapri News in the late 2000s and 2010s (followed by Telecapri from 2015 to 2016) led the series to broadcast in Poland, where Polsat JimJam aired only the sixth and ninth season with Polish subtitles and in the United Kingdom on CBS Justice.

It is unknown whether this show will be available to stream on Paramount+.

As of 2025, the rights to this show are owned by Paramount Global.

== Episodes ==
=== 1950–1951 ===
Partial List of Episodes from the 1950–1951 Season of Armstrong Circle Theatre
Date	Title	Actor(s)
June 6, 1950	"The Magnificent Gesture"	Brian Aherne
June 13, 1950	"The Jackpot"	Stuart Erwin
June 20, 1950	"The Rose and the Shamrock"	Nina Foch
June 27, 1950	"The Chair"	Vaughn Taylor, Lucile Watson
July 11, 1950	"Local Stop"	Vaughn Taylor
August 1, 1950	"The Big Day"	Neil Hamilton, Louise Larabee, Frank McNellis, Pat Crowley, Sally Moffet, Mimi Strongin, Grace Valentine, Victor Sutherland, Tess Vinton
August 15, 1950	"Ring Around My Finger"	Patricia Wheel, John Harvey, Joanne Dolan, Lucille Patten, Jack Sherry, Willis Townsend, John Marley, Elaine Williams
August 29, 1950	"Blaze of Glory"	Judson Pratt, Mary Patton, Reed Brown Jr.
September 26, 1950	"The Elopement"	Robert Allen, Betty Caulfield
October 3, 1950	"Roundup"	Zachary Scott
October 10, 1950	"Give and Take"	Frank Albertson
October 17, 1950	"It's Only a Game"	Donald Woods
November 7, 1950	"Person to Person"	Lawrence Hugo, Gloria Stroock
November 14, 1950	"Best Trip Ever"	Eli Patterson
November 21, 1950	"The Perfect Type"	Richard Derr, Augusta Dabney
December 5, 1950	"Happy Ending"	Otto Kruger, Cathleen Cordell, Helen Gillett, Brandon Peters, Mark Roberts, Barbara Cook, Stuart Nedd
April 17, 1951	"Honor Student"	Donald Buka, Mona Bruns, Raymond Bramley.

=== 1952–1953 ===
Partial List of Episodes from the 1952–1953 Season of Armstrong Circle Theatre
Date	Title	Actor(s)
October 7, 1952	"Remembrance Island"	Reimonda Orselli, Jamie Smith, John Compton, Royal Beal, Floyd Buckley, Catherine Proctor
November 11, 1952	"A Godmother for Amy"	Bunny Lewbel, Stefan Olsen, Evelyn Davis, Dora Sayers, Walter Brooke, Edna Preston, James Reese
November 18, 1952	"A Volcano Is Dancing in Here"	William Prince, Barbara Baxley, Edgar Stehli, Yvette DuGay
December 16, 1952	"The Nothing Kid"	Robert Bernard, Bill Hayes, Jack Whiting
December 30, 1952	"Billy Adams, American"	E. A. Krumachmidt, Richard Wigginton
January 13, 1953	"Ski Story"	Nina Foch, Robert Shackleton

=== 1954 ===
Partial List of Episodes from the 1954 Season of Armstrong Circle Theatre
Date	Title	Actor(s)
February 2, 1954	"Pride of Jonathan Craig"	Valerie Cossart, Addison Richards, Byron Russell, Jack Whiting
March 16, 1954	"The Fugitive"	Anthony Perkins, Dolly Haas, Miko Oscard
April 13, 1954	"The Three Tasks"	Arthur Treacher, Francis L. Sullivan, Patty McCormick, Hugh Reilly
April 20, 1954	"Treasure Trove"	Gene Lockhart, Mildred Dunnock, Wallace Ford

=== 1955–1956 ===
Partial List of Episodes from the 1955–1956 Season of Armstrong Circle Theatre
Date	Title	Actor(s)
December 27, 1955	"Nightmare in Red"	none (documentary)
January 10, 1956	"Ward Three: Four p.m. to Midnight"	Patricia Collinge, Mary Fickett, Peg Feury, Philip Abbott
September 18, 1956	"The Second Family" (repeat)	Larry Gates, Harry Townes, Loretta Leversee, Parker Cormack

=== 1956–1957 ===
Partial List of Episodes from the 1956–1957 Season of Armstrong Circle Theatre
Date	Title	Actor(s)
February 19, 1957	"The Trial of Poznan"	Peter Cookson, Hurd Hatfield, Bert Freed

=== 1957–1958 ===
Partial List of Episodes from the 1957–1958 Season of Armstrong Circle Theatre
Date	Title	Actor(s)
November 27, 1957	"Have Jacket Will Travel"	Don Briggs, Frank Martin Martin Brooks, Miko Oscard, Patty Duke (as Patti Duke), Thomas Tai
March 19, 1958	"The Meanest Crime in the World"	William Prince, Nancy Wickwire, Philip Bourneuf, Miko Oscard

=== 1962–1963 ===
Partial List of Episodes from the 1962–1963 Season of Armstrong Circle Theatre
Date	Title	Actor(s)
January 15, 1963	"The Journey of Poh Lin"	Irene Sen, Zia Mohyeddin, Paul McGrath, Clarice Blackburn, Joan Boepple-Hsu, Elizabeth Moore, June Harding, and Barbara Myers
May 22, 1963	"Swindler in Paradise"	William Redfield
