= Tomorrow (Playhouse 90) =

11th episode of the 4th season of Playhouse 90

- Playhouse 90 episode
- Episode no.: Season 4 Episode 11
- Directed by: Robert Mulligan
- Written by: Horton Foote
- Original air date: March 7, 1960

Guest appearances
- Richard Boone as Jackson Fentry; Kim Stanley as Sarah Eubanks; Chill Wills as Mr. Pruitt; Beulah Bondi as Mrs. Hulie; Charles Bickford as Pa Fentry; Arthur Hunnicutt as circuit-riding preacher; Elizabeth Patterson as Mrs. Pruitt

Episode chronology
| ← Previous "The Cruel Day" | Next → "The Hiding Place" |

"Tomorrow" is an American television play broadcast on March 7, 1960, as part of the CBS television series, Playhouse 90. It is the eleventh episode of the fourth season of Playhouse 90.

== Plot ==
An awkward millhand, Jackson Fentry falls in love with a pregnant woman, Sarah Eubanks, and marries her. She dies in childbirth, and Jackson cares for her son after she dies.

== Cast ==
- Richard Boone as Jackson Fentry
- Kim Stanley as Sarah Eubanks
- Chill Wills as Mr. Pruitt
- Beulah Bondi as Mrs. Hulie, a midwife
- Charles Bickford as Pa Fentry
- Arthur Hunnicutt as circuit-riding preacher
- Elizabeth Patterson as Mrs. Pruitt

== Production ==
Herbert Brodkin was the producer. Robert Mulligan was the director. Horton Foote adapted a William Faulkner short story into the teleplay.

Foote's teleplay was remade into the 1972 film, Tomorrow, starring Robert Duvall as Fentry.

== Reception ==
In The New York Times, John P. Shanley wrote that the production was written in "the plain talk of untutored, uncomplicated persons" and was executed with "warm, genuine and poignant" performances by Stanley and Boone.

Dwight Newton of The San Francisco Examiner wrote that the production "brilliantly and effectively essayed" Faulkner's story. Newton also reacted angrily to a statement by a CBS executive that he saw only "a slim possibility" that the series would continue much longer.

Critic Charlie Wadsworth called it "a powerful, expanded adaption" of Faulkner's story. He praised the "superb" supporting cast, including Bondi, Patterson, and Wills, as one of the strongest in Playhouse 90 history.
