= Bek Nelson =

American actress (1927–2015)

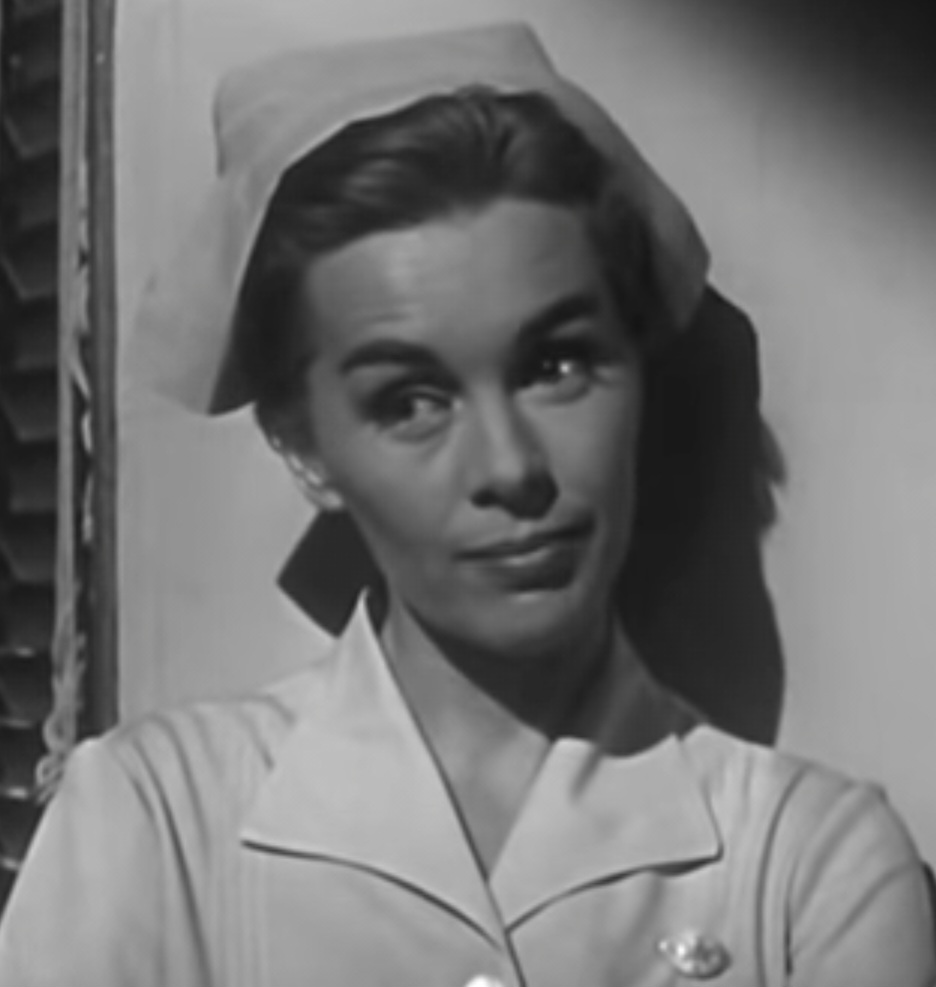
- Nelson in Man with a Camera (1958)
- Born: Doris Dee Stiner; May 8, 1927; Goin, Tennessee, US
- Died: March 28, 2015 (aged 87); Watsonville, California, US
- Education: Lincoln High School (Canton, Ohio)
- Occupation: Actress
- Years active: 1956–1966
- Spouse: Don Gordon (m. 1959; div. 1979)
- Children: 1

Bek Nelson (born Doris Dee Stiner; May 8, 1927 – March 28, 2015) was an American model and showgirl who turned to acting at age 29, making seven films and two dozen television shows in her first three years.

== Early life ==
She was born Doris Dee Stiner (Note: Census takers in both 1930 and 1940 used the more familiar spelling of "Steiner", but her high-school yearbook and newspaper accounts show it as "Stiner") in Goin, Tennessee. (Note: Goin (pronounced like "going") in Claiborne County is what Bek told reporters and publicity agents was her birthplace, while a cousin in Tennessee told the Knoxville Journal it was Sharp's Chapel in Union County. The two unincorporated areas are separated by only 3 miles in rugged, rural terrain) Her parents were Ralph Stiner and Mae Cole Stiner. She had four younger brothers and a younger sister.

The family moved from Tennessee to Canton, Ohio, when Stiner was 18 months old. Her father worked as a metal sander and then later as an inspector for Timken Roller Bearing Company. At age 10, Stiner won a "Cutest Child" contest. She attended Lincoln High School from 1941 thru 1945. While in high school, she was active in dramatics, chorus, and student government, and had roles in the junior- and senior-class plays.

== New York ==
After graduation, Stiner and a girlfriend moved to New York City, where Stiner found work as a Powers model. Her specialty was modeling swimsuits, for which she became well known through newspaper photos and ads. She first lived in Manhattan, then moved to Newark, New Jersey, as her swimsuit career built up. She won a number of small, local beauty contests, which again brought her newspaper publicity. She also served as a model for publicizing events and trade shows.

By 1951, however, she decided to take on a regular performing gig as a dancer with the Copacabana chorus line. Her first night was a disaster, as the presence of the audience rattled her. She credited the nightclub's manager for her recovery:

I went completely to pieces when I saw the audience, but Mr. Entratter, an understanding man, told me to sit at a table and watch the show. The next night I went on and performed like a pro, otherwise my career would have ended before it began.

Stiner did well enough to hold her job for two years. While at the Copacabana, comic strip artist Milton Caniff picked her out to be his model for the character Miss Mizzou in Steve Canyon. Years later, the Knoxville Journal ran an old photo of her posing for Caniff, with a large sketch of the character and the artist's hands and distinctive signature visible in the foreground.

In 1953, new owners took over the Copacabana, and Entratter left to be general manager of the Sands Hotel. Stiner and four other Copacabana dancers were let go, and all five decided to follow Entratter to Las Vegas to be showgirls. Entratter billed them as the "CopaGirls", using them for publicity that encouraged other young women to try out for a contest to become a CopaGirl at $150 a week.

== Columbia contract ==
Stiner was at the Sands for at least three years. According to her later recounting with interviewers, she was performing there when Cinerama filmed the floor show. A talent scout for Columbia Pictures saw the film, noticed her, and signed her to a contract with that studio. However, her first work with Columbia, filming Pal Joey, did not start until April 1957, while newspaper photos from one year earlier show her doing a modeling assignment in Los Angeles as "Bek Nelson". (Note: This was to promote a new imported Sunbeam auto called the Rapier, for which the ad agency had Bek Nelson dress like a musketeer complete with a rapier) This is the earliest verifiable use of her stage name. Columnist Lowell E. Redelings said, "there's quite a story to how she got that unusual first name", but didn't see fit to share it with his readers.

Bek Nelson appeared on camera for an episode of a ZIV-produced television program, Science Fiction Theatre, which was first broadcast in August 1956. She had no lines and the two-minute part was uncredited, but it clearly establishes that her screen debut came prior to her contract with Columbia. She also did TV commercials prior to being signed by Columbia.

While filming Pal Joey during April and May 1957, Bek was used for an uncredited bit as a nurse in Operation Mad Ball, which was also in production on the Columbia lot. She then co-starred in a Columbia comedy short Tricky Chicks with Muriel Landers, playing nightclub hostesses suspected of being foreign agents. According to columnist Hedda Hopper, Columbia head Harry Cohn was "giving Bek Nelson a big, big build-up."

Cohn had Columbia cast her in four more films made in 1957, to be released in 1958. She had a small, uncredited part as a dance-hall girl in Cowboy, then a feature role as a stewardess in the disaster film Crash Landing. Bek told the Knoxville Journal that the ocean rescue scene was filmed at the studio lake, with the director requesting, "Please don't anyone stand up in the water... we don't want anyone to know our ocean is only three feet deep." Next came another comedy short, with The Three Stooges in Flying Saucer Daffy. Finally, she went back to an uncredited dance-hall girl bit in Gunman's Walk

Bek's next film for Columbia, Bell, Book and Candle, was made and released in 1958. It was also her last film; Harry Cohn died of a heart attack at the end of February that year. His successors let her contract finish up in 1958 with lending her out for television shows.

== Television 1957-1966 ==
When she was not making films, Columbia lent Bek out to television production companies, including the associated Screen Gems. As 1957 was top-heavy with film work, she did only two TV programs that year, but 1958 had her doing 15 episodes, a large number for anyone not playing a series regular. Included among these were 9 episodes of the ABC series Lawman, where she had a recurring role as a widowed restaurant owner. Columnist Jack Gaver mused, "It is difficult to decide which name is odder -- Bek Nelson or Dru Lemp. The former plays the latter ..." An unknown TV Key Mailbag editor found the name confusing. A letter writer asked who played the mean guy, "tall, with strange eyes, and an unusual face" on "The Deputy" episode of Lawman. The editor replied, "the villain on that show was an actor named Bek Nelson". (Note: There were three "mean guys" in this episode, but the main mean guy fitting this description, the actual actor playing the main villain, was Jack Elam. The other two meanies were Lee Van Cleef and Edd Byrnes.)

By 1959, Bek Nelson was an independent actress, represented by the Harold L. Gefesky Agency, with whom she remained throughout her show-business career. Once again she appeared on 15 episodes of shows, including another small recurring bit on four episodes of The Third Man. Guest star, feature player, and bit part were all represented in her resume of parts that year, and for years to come. She had no professional vanity about her billing status, but like other television actresses of the time, found doing Westerns to be limiting.

A girl in a television horse opera can be typed as a dance-hall hostess, a rancher's wife, a rancher's daughter, a gambling-hall queen, or a gal from the East visiting the rugged West. And the last choice is that of the frontier town's restaurant owner, which I currently fill.

For 1960 and 1961, the number of television roles she accepted were reduced to half or less of previous years. She was married now, her husband had a successful acting career, and they were hoping to start a family. Subsequent years had her sometimes do only two shows a year. Her career did pick up some in 1964 and 1965; she had a small part in her husband's award-winning indie film The Lollipop Cover and a brief recurring role on Peyton Place, for most episodes of which she was shown just talking on the phone, without directly interacting with the other actors. Her final acting job was a pro bono bit in 1966 for Insight, a syndicated show usually shown on Sundays.

== Personal life ==
According to an article in TV Guide, Bek was married shortly after moving to New York in 1945, with the marriage being annulled.

Reporting the aftermath of a fire in Laurel Canyon during July 1959, the Los Angeles Times cited a Mrs. Bek Nelson Gordon as saying several houses near hers on Willow Glen Road had been lost. However, actor Don Gordon and Bek Nelson did not take out a marriage license until much later. They were married under her birth name on December 31, 1959, in Los Angeles. At that time, a cohabitating single actress could suffer a serious career setback if the situation became widely known.

This was Gordon's third marriage and Bek's second. Gordon told an interviewer in October 1960, "she doesn't want to be an actress, and I'm glad. I think women should stay home, keep house, and have babies." Bek evidently agreed, for she stopped acting after the couple adopted a daughter in 1966. The couple remained married for 20 years, divorcing in 1979.

== Filmography ==
Film (by year of first release)
Year	Title	Role	Notes
1957	Pal Joey	Lola	Bek is a "Sex-Tet", the six girl chorus line backing Frank Sinatra in this adaption of the Broadway musical
1957	Operation Mad Ball	Nurse	Uncredited; she was put in this while also filming Pal Joey on another sound stage at Columbia
1957	Tricky Chicks	Bek	One of the last Columbia shorts produced by Jules White has Bek as a nightclub hostess
1958	Cowboy	Charlie's Girl	Uncredited; she played a dance hall girl involved with cowpoke Dick York
1958	Crash Landing (Note: Working title was Rescue at Sea)	Nancy Arthur	First feature role has her as a stewardess on board a plane that crashes in the Atlantic
1958	Flying Saucer Daffy	Tyrin	Columbia Three Stooges short; Bek plays a peaceful alien who befriends Joe Besser
1958	Gunman's Walk	Dance Hall Girl	Uncredited; Tab Hunter sings to Bek
1958	Bell, Book and Candle	Tina	She plays Jimmie Stewart's secretary in her last Columbia film
1965	The Lollipop Cover	Waitress	B/W Indie film co-written by and starring Bek's husband; won award at Chicago Film Festival
1965	Invisible Diplomats	Jackie	Short educational film produced by AT&T about telephone switches

Television (in original broadcast order)
Year	Series	Episode	Role	Notes
1956	Science Fiction Theatre	Living Lights	Herself	Uncredited; she silently assists host Truman Bradley during the intro
1957	Tales of the Texas Rangers	Panhandle	Claire Tatum	
1957	Playhouse 90	The Edge of Innocence	Fran Pauling	
1958	Telephone Time	Man of Principle	Daphne, dau of Hiero II	Bek spurs Archimedes (Jonathan Harris) to explain a fraud
1958	Panic!	Twenty-Six Hours to Sunrise		
1958	Lawman	The Deputy	Dru Lemp	Bek plays widow of previous Laramie marshal
1958	Lawman	The Prisoner	Dru Lemp	
1958	Lawman	The Joker	Dru Lemp	
1958	Behind Closed Doors	Trouble in Test Cell 19	Kitty	
1958	Flight	The Dart	Lorraine	
1958	Lawman	Wanted	Dru Lemp	Bek helps Marshal Troop (John Russell) track down a killer
1958	M Squad	The Big Kill	Ruby Angel	
1958	Lawman	Bloodline	Dru Lemp	
1958	Lawman	The Intruders	Dru Lemp	
1958	Lawman	Short Straw	Dru Lemp	
1958	Lawman	Lady in Question	Dru Lemp	
1958	Lawman	The Master	Dru Lemp	
1958	The Restless Gun	The Way Back	Dixie Starr	
1959	Mike Hammer	Accentuate the Negative	Sergeant Maureen Hurley	
1959	The Third Man	Sparks from a Dead Fire	Janet	
1959	State Trooper	Carson City Kitty	Sara Williams	
1959	The Third Man	The Indispensable Man	Linda	
1959	The Third Man	How to Buy a Country	Linda	
1959	Buckskin	I'll Sing at Your Wedding	Melissa Jenkins	Bek was on this program the same night (May 4).....
1959	Peter Gunn	The Family Affair	Virginia Carter	.....that she was on this show
1959	The Third Man	Five Hours to Kill	Linda	
1959	Bonanza	Death on Sun Mountain	Glory	Dance hall girl Bek has unscrupulous boy friend
1959	Tightrope!	Thousand Dollar Bill	Judy	Elevator operator Bek helps recover 100 thousand dollar bills
1959	Man with a Camera	The Killer	Nurse Purdy	
1959	Bachelor Father	Kelly: The Golddigger	Sheila Maybrook	
1959	Men Into Space	Moonquake	Jane Farrow	
1959	Shotgun Slade	Mesa of Missing Men	Kathy	
1959	Mike Hammer	The Big Drop	Dorothy Webb	
1960	Wanted Dead or Alive	The Monster	Hannah	S2 E19 Circus acrobat who adopts orphaned "Indian Boy" and elephant
1960	77 Sunset Strip	The Legend of Crystal Dart	Marie Lang	
1960	The Deputy	The Chain of Action	Claudia	Another dance hall girl role
1960	Bourbon Street Beat	Deadly Persuasion	Myra Norton	Bek is a politician's wife whose young brother is in prison
1960	The Brothers Brannagan	Her Brother's Keeper	Nancy Randolph	
1960	The Best of the Post	Treasury Agent	Mrs. Kearns	
1961	Westinghouse Playhouse	Amateur Mother	Airline Stewardess	
1961	Lock-Up	Fugitive from Fear	Naomi Matson	
1961	Dante	Pick a Peck of Diamonds	Cara Chandler	
1961	Bat Masterson	Episode in Eden	Martha Yale	
1961	Perry Mason	The Case of the Jealous Journalist	Miriam Coffey	
1961	Perry Mason	The Case of the Pathetic Patient	Janice Edley	
1961	The Joey Bishop Show	Five Brides for Joey	Annabelle Johnson	
1962	Cain's Hundred	The Debasers	Frances Colerane	Bek plays wife of publisher's flack (Robert Vaughn)
1962	The Hathaways	It's in the Cards		
1963	Sam Benedict	Not Even the Gulls Shall Weep	Beverly Reade	
1963	Hazel	Dorothy Takes a Trip	Dr. Phyllis Gordon	
1964	Ben Casey	The Only Place They Know My Name	Christine Stevens	
1964	Breaking Point	A Land More Cruel	Mady	
1964	Perry Mason	The Case of the Antic Angel	Dana Kent	
1964	The Donna Reed Show	Quads of Trouble	Mrs. Gayley	Bek has quadruplets
1964	Burke's Law	Who Killed the Swinger on a Hook	Miss Smith	
1965	Peyton Place	(1965-11-25)	Phyllis Sloan	Bek phones this one in
1965	Peyton Place	Episode	Phyllis Sloan	
1965	Peyton Place	Episode	Phyllis Sloan	
1966	Peyton Place	(1966-01-27)	Phyllis Sloan	Bek finally gets to interact with other characters
1966	Insight	Prometheus Bound	Carole	Bek has an affair with her boss until his wife gives birth
