= Miko Oscard =

American film and television actor

- Born: Michael Lee Oscard; 1944 (age 81); Manhattan, New York, U.S.
- Education: Teaneck High School; Jacksonville University
- Occupation: Actor
- Years active: 1954–1961

Miko Oscard (born Michael Lee Oscard; 1944) is an American former child actor of film and television, best known for his portrayals of Ilyusha Snegiryov in The Brothers Karamazov and Reuben Widdicomb in the original Studio One production of Abby Mann's A Child Is Waiting, as well as a host of other prominent Golden Age guest spots alongside co-stars such as Kim Stanley, Jason Robards Jr., Paul Newman, Olga Bellin, Mary Astor, Nina Foch, Beulah Bondi, and Patty Duke.

== Early life and career ==
Born in Manhattan and raised in Teaneck, New Jersey, Oscard is the older of two surviving sons (Note: The qualification "surviving" is due to stories published in both Variety and the Pittsburgh Post-Gazette in October 1939 (not quite ten months after the marriage of Marty Oscard and Betty Brooks), clearly stating that Mrs. Oscard had given birth to a boy on October 14. Given the absence of any subsequent mention of this child, one can only assume the Oscards' first-born did not live long.) born to Betty Blue—née Brooks—and Sammy Kaye saxophonist Martin Leonard "Marty" Oscard. Active in the local Reform synagogue, Teaneck's Temple Emeth (where he was elected student vice president in 1958 and received his confirmation in 1960), Oscard was of French descent and reportedly spent at least parts of every pre-teen summer at his grandparents' home in France. As would later be noted, it was both his fluency in French and the authenticity of his French-accented English that facilitated Oscard's entry into the ranks of professional child actors, and it was his father's sister Fernande "Fifi" Oscard—later a famed talent agency head, but then employed at LPA, where she handled all TV casting—who pulled that trigger in 1954 by casting Miko, then aged nine, alongside Anthony Perkins and Dolly Haas in the Armstrong Circle Theatre episode, "The Fugitive."

In 1955, Oscard made his sole appearance on the short-lived ABC dramatic anthology series, The Elgin Hour, with Kim Stanley and John Ireland in Joseph Schull's "The Bridge," set in France in the immediate aftermath of World War II. Portraying the much-despised son of "collaborationist" Stanley and a German officer (Anthony Dawson), Oscard's work was deemed "marvelous in scenes which put the child actor to considerable strain and test" by Star Ledger critic Burton Rascoe.

In February 1958, alongside veteran stage and screen performer David Opatoshu, Oscard made his brief but impactful feature film debut as Ilyusha Snegiryov—son of Opatoshu's Captain Snegiryov—in The Brothers Karamazov. The Hollywood Reporter's Jack Moffitt was one of at least three reviewers to single out the pair's contribution, noting that "Opatoshu, as a cashiered officer, and Miko Oscard, as the tubercular son, keep alive an important subplot with just the right shades of dramatic modulation." Moreover, the denouement of said subplot—the apology whose presentation to, and acceptance by, young Snegiryov proves so vital to the film's protagonist, Brynner's Dmitri Fyodorovich—constitutes the film's final scene, wherein—unlike the novel, whose conclusion takes place at Ilyusha's funeral—it is Oscard's Ilyusha who delivers TBK's joyously tearful last line: "Oh, Father, how proud I am of you — how proud!"

The following month Miko was featured on Armstrong Circle Theatre, in Jerome Coopersmith's "The Meanest Crime in the World," as 12-year-old Larry Porter, one of several unfortunate cancer victims preyed upon by the medical charlatan portrayed by William Prince. Oscard's next assignment, Studio One's "The Littlest Enemy", from a story by Nigel Kneale, harkens back to the 1955 Elgin Hour episode with Kim Stanley. Once again, set in post-war France, and again cast as the scapegoated offspring of a German soldier, but this time orphaned and dependent upon an indifferent grandmother and hateful uncle. This seemingly bleak scenario, however, is quickly redeemed by a clearly visible tunnel-ending light in the form of two eager-to-adopt American tourists (Mary Astor and Frank Conroy). Scripps-Howard's Harriet Van Horne was especially taken with Francois's scenes with his would-be adoptive mom.

All the scenes between Miss Astor and Master Miko were sensitively played, though neither spoke the other's language. It was a moving and provocative play, skillfully handled in every way. One turned it off, though, with a prayer that little Francois would outgrow his attachment to daddy's old soldier suit and bayonet.

In 1961, Oscard co-starred with Beulah Bondi in the much-belated premiere of "Antidote for Hatred"—an episode, filmed circa August 1957, in the long-delayed, short-lived dramatic anthology series, The Best of the Post—as Josef, a young, orphaned Hungarian refugee who "attempts extreme resistance methods to deal with a neighborhood bully," while Bondi, his American adoptive parent, attempts to talk him off that ledge.

Oscard's final screen appearance, teamed with actor Alan Bunce and airing in January 1962, was a segment on the CBS special The Good Years, with Oscard cast as the "Horatio Alger bootblack, who is rewarded for his industry and clean living by the proverbial merchant prince (Bunce)."

== Retirement and beyond ==
During his career, despite his mother's initial concerns, Oscard had always kept up with his school work (including, evidently, such notable extra-curricular activities as a 1960 high school production of Thornton Wilder's Our Town), making up missed assignments whenever necessary. In 1962, he graduated from Teaneck High School. At that time, however, Oscard put an end to his screen career, "not so much because I wanted to," he later recalled, "but because my parents felt it would be the best thing for me. Actually I wanted to forget college and continue in the field." Nonetheless, he attended Jacksonville University, albeit with a major in drama, and it was not until his junior year that Oscard finally resolved to pursue his passion. He dropped out of school out and found work as a property manager and bit player with Robert Ludlum's Playhouse on the Mall, located at the Bergen Mall in Paramus, New Jersey.

Oscard was with the Playhouse for at least the better part of 1966 and was prominently featured in a full page photo spread on the company published that September in the Ridgewood Herald-News. During the season, his most notable onstage appearance was undoubtedly his first, as Al, the porter in Russell Crouse and Howard Lindsay's Remains to Be Seen, not least because his single moment onstage—punchline included—rates an entire paragraph of coverage in that week's Sunday News.

Every member of the large cast has the opportunity to at least one good line [sic], no matter how brief his appearance in the production. Early in the second act, Rosenberg is attempting to finger-print any potential suspect having had access to the victim's living quarters when he encounters Al, the Porter, portrayed by Miko Oscard, making his lone appearance on stage. Informed by Rosenberg he would have to be printed, Oscard queried, 'You the cops?' Assured they were, he quickly replied, 'You mugs already got my finger-prints.'

Notwithstanding subsequent appearances in Paddy Chayefsky's The Tenth Man and Arthur Marx's The Impossible Years, plus encouraging words from Ludlum himself, efforts to reboot his once-thriving screen career ultimately proved fruitless. Following at least two additional stage appearances (both in 1969, with the Bergen County Players at the Little Firehouse Theater in Oradell), Oscard received a grant to return to school, where he studied animal husbandry. He next resurfaced in 1993 in Simi Valley, where he had established a practice providing pet grooming and training.

== Personal life ==
In 1996, Oscard changed his legal name from Michael Lee Oscard to Michael Lee Carol.

== Selected filmography ==
- The Armstrong Circle Theatre
  - Season 4 Episode 28: "The Fugitive" (1954)
  - Season 8 Episode 5: "Have Jacket Will Travel" (1957)
  - Season 8 Episode 13: "The Meanest Crime in the World" (1958) – Larry Porter
- The Elgin Hour (1955) Season 1 Episode 8: "The Bridge" – Jean
- The Philco Television Playhouse (1955) Season 1 Episode 17: "Letter of Recommendation" – Rod (as Miko Oskard)
- Star Tonight (1955) Season 1 Episode 30: "Flame and Ice" – Either Willie or Tad Lincoln
- The Alcoa Hour (1956) Season 1 Episode 8: "A Patch of Faith" as Peppino
- The United States Steel Hour
  - Season 3 Episode 31: "The Five Fathers of Pepi" (1956) – Pepi
  - Season 4 Episode 20: "The Little Bullfighter" (1957) – Pepe
  - Season 5 Episode 21: "The Littlest Enemy" (1958) – Francois
  - Season 7 Episode 11: "You Can't Have Everything" (1960)
  - Season 8 Episode 5: "The Time to Decide" (1960) – Violin Student
- Studio One (1957)
  - Season 9 Episode 8: "Portrait of a Citizen" (1956) – Paul
  - Season 9 Episode 22: "A Child Is Waiting" (1957) – Reuben Widdicomb
- DuPont Show of the Month (1958) Season 1 Episode 5: "The Bridge of San Luis Rey" – Miguel
- The Brothers Karamazov (1958) – Ilyusha Snegiryov
- Face of Fire (1959) – Jimmy Trescott
- Deadline (1959) Season 1 Episode 25: "Character Witness" – Steve as Boy (as Miko Oskard)
- Playhouse 90 (1960) Season 4 Episode 11: "The Cruel Day" – Michel, the captain's son
- The Best of the Post (1961) Season 1 Episode 20: "Antidote for Hatred" – Josef
- True Story
- The Good Years (CBS TV Special) (1962) – Bootblack (Horatio Algier segment)
