= Al Hoisington =

American football player (born 1933)

No. 84, 88
- Position: End

Personal information
- Born: November 18, 1933 (age 92); Chicago, Illinois, U.S.
- Listed height: 6 ft 3 in (1.91 m)
- Listed weight: 200 lb (91 kg)

Career information
- High school: Van Nuys (Los Angeles, California)
- College: Pasadena CC
- NFL draft: 1960: undrafted

Career history
- Oakland Raiders (1960); Buffalo Bills (1960)

Career NFL statistics
- Games played: 14
- Receptions: 8
- Receiving yards: 141
- Receiving TDs: 2
- Stats at Pro Football Reference

Allan G. Hoisington (born November 18, 1933) is an American former professional football player who was an end with the Buffalo Bills and Oakland Raiders of the American Football League (AFL). He played college football at Pasadena City College.
