= The Tunnel (Playhouse 90) =

- Playhouse 90 episode
- Episode no.: Season 4 Episode 6
- Directed by: Delbert Mann
- Written by: David Shaw
- Original air date: December 10, 1959
- Running time: 83 minutes

Guest appearances
- Richard Boone; Rip Torn; Onslow Stevens; Jack Weston; Ken Lynch; Robert Carson; Sandy Kenyon; Bartlett Robinson

Episode chronology
← Previous "The Grey Nurse Said Nothing"	Next → "The Silver Whistle"

"The Tunnel" is a pre-recorded American television play first broadcast on December 10, 1959, as part of the CBS television series, Playhouse 90. It is the sixth episode of the fourth season of Playhouse 90 and the 123rd episode overall.

== Plot ==
The play is set in the Civil War and depicts the plan by a Union officer, Lt. Col. Henry Pleasants, to end a stalemate by digging a tunnel under Confederate forces and then exploding the enemy with dynamite. The story was based on the Battle of the Crater that occurred in July 1864 near Petersburg, Virginia.

== Cast ==
- Richard Boone as Lt. Col. Henry Pleasants
- Rip Torn as Lt. Jacob Douty
- Onslow Stevens as Gen. Ambrose Burnside
- Jack Weston as Wocziki
- Ken Lynch as Sgt. Reese
- Robert Carson as Major Gen. George Meade
- Sandy Kenyon as Martinson
- Bartlett Robinson as Captain Handley

== Production ==
Fred Coe was the producer. Delbert Mann was the director, and David Shaw wrote the teleplay. Eddie Albert, the star of the next production, "The Silver Whistle", hosted the broadcast.

== Reception ==
The climactic scenes of the crater formed by exclusion, with wounded and maimed soldiers dead, dying, and screaming, was described by Associated Press writer Cynthia Lowry as "a grisly editorial against human slaughter." The UPI described these scenes as "television triumphs."

In The New York Times, Richard F. Shepard found the production to be realistic with impressive staging of busy and loud battle scenes.
