= Accused (1958 TV series) =

American court show (1958–1959)

- Genre: Dramatized court show
- Starring: Edgar Allan Jones, Jr.
- Country of origin: United States
- Original language: English
- No. of seasons: 1

Production
- Producer: Selig J. Seligman

Original release
- Network: ABC
- Release: December 10, 1958 – September 30, 1959

Accused is an American dramatized court show consisting of filmed reenactments of actual court cases that began on December 3, 1958, and ended on September 30, 1959. The show was cancelled at the end of its first season.

== Background ==
In the summer of 1957, local television station KABC-TV began broadcasting Traffic Court, presenting re-enactments of traffic court cases and arraignments. The format proved popular and the show moved to ABC's national daytime schedule. It was soon followed by the syndicated Divorce Court and Day in Court. In December 1958, Accused debuted as the prime time version of Day in Court.

== Casting ==
Similar to other courtroom dramas of the time, the defendants and witnesses were actors (including, for example, Pamela Mason and Robert Culp). However, the defense and prosecution attorneys were real-life lawyers. The court was presided over by Edgar Allan Jones, Jr. Jones had a law degree from the University of Virginia, was a member of the UCLA law faculty and a labor arbitrator.

- Edgar Allan Jones, Jr. as the Judge
- William Gwinn as the Substitute Judge
- Jim Hodson as the Clerk
- Tim Farrell as the Bailiff
- Violet Gillmore as the Court Reporter (and Announcer)

== Production ==
The show was produced by Selig J. Seligman, a former U.S. Army lawyer who served at the Nuremberg Trials. He later became an ABC Vice President as well as executive producer of Combat! and Garrison's Gorillas.

The program was broadcast from 9:30 to 10 p.m. Eastern Time on Wednesdays.
