= Gary Garrison (playwright) =

American dramatist

Gary Wayne Garrison (born May 3, 1956) is an American playwright, screenwriter, and educator who has served as Executive Director of Creative Affairs for the Dramatists Guild of America, New York, from 2007 to 2016. He is the former Artistic Director and Division Head of Playwriting for the Goldberg Department of Dramatic Writing at the Tisch School of the Arts, where he still serves on the adjunct faculty teaching graduate students.

== Education ==
Garrison graduated from Lutcher Stark High School in Orange, Texas in 1974. He then studied theatre (acting) at Lamar University, graduating in 1978. He went on to receive an MA in Theatre Arts from the University of North Texas, 1980, and a Ph.D. in Playwriting and Directing in 1986 from the University of Michigan.

== Career ==
After graduate school, Garrison began his work at NYU in 1986. In 1989 he began a long association with the Kennedy Center American College Theatre Festival, serving first as Regional Chair of Playwriting, then moving in 1999 to become the National Vice-Chair and 2001, the National Chair of Playwriting for the Kennedy Center American College Theater Festival In 2002, he was appointed Program Director of the summer playwriting intensive, teaching with the instructional staff alongside fellow playwrights Marsha Norman, Steven Dietz, and David Ives.

Since 1986, Garrison has served in various capacities on the faculty of the Goldberg Department of Dramatic Writing at New York University’s Tisch School of the Arts: Adjunct faculty, Full-time faculty, Program Coordinator, Program Director, Associate Chair, Artistic Director, Master Teacher of Playwriting. He also served on the administrative committees of the 2009 -2015 Tony Awards.

Garrison is also an in-demand speaker and guest lecturer.

In 2014, The John F. Kennedy Center for the Performing Arts, and the Kennedy Center's American College Theatre Festival (KCACTF), honored Garrison by naming an annual playwriting award after him for his contribution to the form: The Gary Garrison National Ten-Minute Play Award.

== Works ==
=== Plays ===
- Verticals and Horizontals
- Ties That Bind
- Caught, Without Candy
- Game On
- The Rubber Room
- Buddy
- The Sweep (short play)
- Storm on Storm (short play)
- Dump (short play)
- It Belongs on Stage (And Not in My Bed) (short play)
- An Angel in the Early Bird Special (ten-minute play)
- Padding the Wagon (ten-minute play)
- The Big, Fat Naked Truth (one-act)
- Rug Store Cowboy (ten-minute)
- Oh, Messiah Me (one-act)
- Cherry Reds
- Gawk (ten-minute play)
- We Make a Wall
- When a Diva Dreams
- Scream, With Laughter (ten-minute play)
- Smoothness, With Cool (monologue)
- Does Anyone Want a Miss Cow Bayou? (ten-minute play)
- Four Cornered Men and Women (an evening of eight monologues)

=== Screenplays ===
- Fool Me Once (1998)
- Seven Days (1998)
- Still Waters (1997)
- The Payoff (1996)
- Truth and Beauty (1994)
- The Mayworkers (1991)
- Play It by Ear (1990)

=== Books ===
- A More Perfect Ten: Writing and Producing the Ten-Minute Play (2009)
- The Kennedy Center Presents: Best Student Plays of the American College Theatre Festival (2006)
- The New, Improved Playwright's Survival Guide (2005)
- Monologues for Men by Men vol. 1-3
- Perfect Ten: Writing and Producing the Ten-Minute Play (2001)
- The Playwright's Survival Guide: Keeping the Drama in Your Work and Out of Your Life (1999)
