= Day in Court =

American court show (1958–1962)

- Genre: Dramatized court show
- Written by: Kenneth M. Rosen
- Directed by: Paul Nickell
- Starring: Edgar Allan Jones, Jr. William Gwinn
- Country of origin: United States
- Original language: English
- No. of seasons: 7

Production
- Producer: Gene Banks
- Production locations: Los Angeles, California, U.S.
- Running time: 30 minutes

Original release
- Network: ABC
- Release: October 13, 1958 – February 1965

Related
- Accused Morning Court; Divorce Court Traffic Court

Day in Court is an American dramatized court show that aired on ABC Daytime from October 13, 1958, to February 1965.

== Background and overview ==
In the summer of 1957, ABC owned-and-operated Los Angeles affiliate KABC began broadcasting a show entitled Traffic Court. The series presented re-enactments of traffic court cases and arraignments. First the series aired locally but became part of ABC's national daytime schedule. It was soon followed by Divorce Court which premiered on, then, local Los Angeles independent station KTTV, (now a Fox owned-and-operated television station), in 1957. The show became nationally syndicated in 1958.

Day in Court premiered on October 13, 1958 as part of ABC's daytime schedule. The program aired five days a week in the afternoon. The program provided viewers with as realistic a look as possible at how real trials are conducted and decided. Re-enactments of actual cases were used, with real attorneys making their arguments in front of real judges. Only the defendants and witnesses were actors.

Edgar Allan Jones, Jr. and William Gwinn played the judge on alternating days. Jones had a law degree from the University of Virginia, was a member of the UCLA law faculty and a labor arbitrator. Gwinn was an actor.

== Jones quits ==
By 1964, Day in Court was daytime TV's top-ranked program, with 20 million viewers. But when it slipped to second behind the daytime soap General Hospital, ABC decided to turn its courtroom hit into a soap opera. Jones quit in October 1964, and the series was cancelled four months later in February 1965.

== Spin-offs ==
Day in Court had two spin-offs. They were Accused, (which Jones also presided over), and Morning Court. Accused aired during the 1958-59 television season. Morning Court aired during the 1960-61 television season. Both shows aired on ABC.
