= The Best of the Post =

American television series

The Best of the Post is a syndicated anthology drama television series adapted from stories published in The Saturday Evening Post magazine. It was produced by John J. Enders and hosted by John Conte. A total of 26 half-hour episodes, all in color, aired from 1960 to 1961 with stars that included Marie Windsor, Pat O'Brien, Charles Coburn, Peter Lorre, Bonita Granville, Martin Landau, June Lockhart, Buddy Ebsen, and Vincent Price.

Ted Post was the director. The programs were produced by Jack Wrather Productions, with ITC handling distribution. A "large-scale promotional blitz" by the Post helped to pave the way for stations to broadcast the show.
