= Number 1, 1950 (Lavender Mist) =

1950 painting by Jackson Pollock

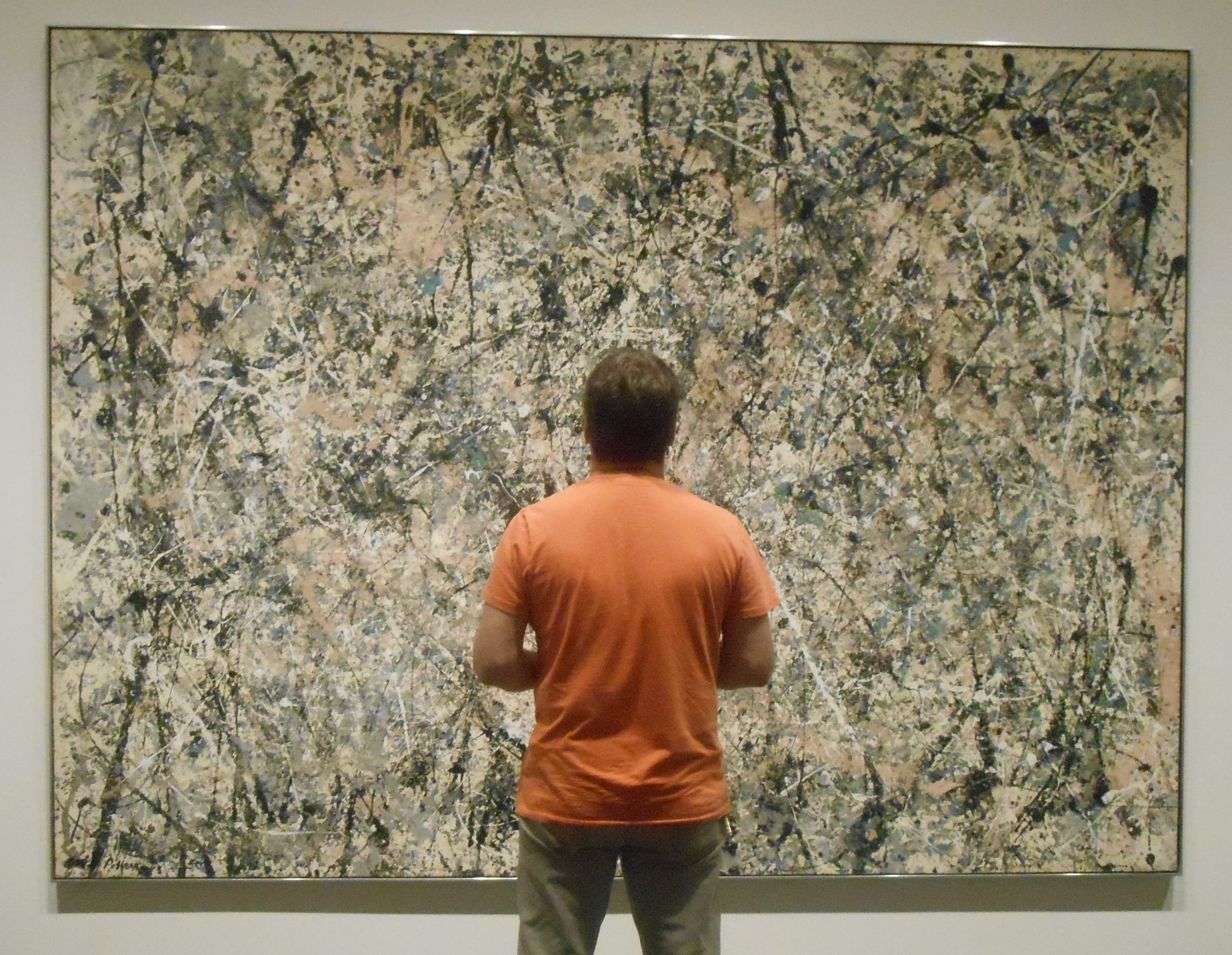
Lavender Mist in the National Gallery of Art in 2013 (with observer)

Lavender Mist is a painting by Abstract Expressionist painter Jackson Pollock. It is a classic example of his poured (or “drip”) style of painting. Painted in the summer of 1950, it was first exhibited later that year at the Betty Parsons Gallery in New York City. As art historian Gail Levin writes, “Running from 28 November through 16 December 1950, the exhibition included thirty-two works, several of them now considered Pollock's best: Autumn Rhythm, Lavender Mist, and One.” Lavender Mist has been in the permanent collection of the National Gallery of Art in Washington, D.C., since 1976.

== Background and context ==
Jackson Pollock was born in Cody, Wyoming, in 1912, though he lived there for less than a year as an infant. His family knocked around between Phoenix and Northern California before settling in Southern California, where Pollock went to high school (he did not graduate). In the fall of 1930, he moved to New York City, following the path of his oldest brother, Charles, and enrolling at the Art Students League, where he would take classes under American social realist painter Thomas Hart Benton.

Pollock worked in obscurity throughout the 1930s, supported primarily by the Federal Art Project of the WPA. He would not gain recognition in the New York art world until 1942. In the catalogue for the 1998-99 Pollock retrospective at the Museum of Modern Art, Kirk Varnedoe writes, “But if at any point in the intervening years he had been run over by a bus, or (more likely) gotten himself killed in a drunken accident, there would be no trace of him in the history of modern art, nor any reason to look for one.”

=== First successes ===
Pollock finally gained recognition at the January–February 1942 exhibition American and French Paintings, curated by John Graham at the McMillen Gallery in New York City. Pollock biographers Steven Naifeh and Gregory White Smith state that this exhibition “launched” Pollock's career. Pollock would also meet his future wife, painter Lee Krasner, in the run-up to this show, at which she also exhibited.

In the spring of 1943, Pollock participated in a group show at Peggy Guggenheim’s Art of This Century gallery. Guggenheim disliked the painting Pollock submitted (originally titled Painting, later retitled Stenographic Figure), but when Piet Mondrian (one of her jurors for the show, along with Marcel Duchamp and others) approved of it, she accepted it into the show. Pollock was thirty-one years old.

The painting did not sell, however, and with the termination of the Federal Art Project on January 29, 1943, Pollock found work at the Museum of Non-Objective Painting, owned by Peggy Guggenheim’s uncle, Solomon R. Guggenheim. (Pollock’s duties at the museum included building and repairing frames, hanging pictures, running the elevator and doing custodial work. One of Pollock’s co-workers at the museum was Robert De Niro Sr.) However, shortly after starting this job, Peggy Guggenheim, through the machinations of her factotum, Howard Putzel, offered Pollock a one-man show at Art of This Century and signed him to a contract providing a stipend of $150/month.

Jackson Pollock’s first one-man show was held at Art of This Century from November 9 to 27, 1943. Although some of the paintings in this first show were similar in style to Stenographic Figure, Pollock introduced a new strain in his work with three paintings that would become among his best known: Male and Female (Philadelphia Museum of Art), Guardians of the Secret (San Francisco Museum of Modern Art), and The She-Wolf. Contrasting these works with Stenographic Figure, Varnedoe describes them as "darker in feeling, more hieratic, and much more congested, both in pictorial space and in their heavily reworked surfaces.” A fourth work in this stylistic series is the noted Pasiphaë, now in the Metropolitan Museum of Art. It was completed too late for the show, as was another early masterpiece, the Mural for Peggy Guggenheim's apartment on the Upper East Side.

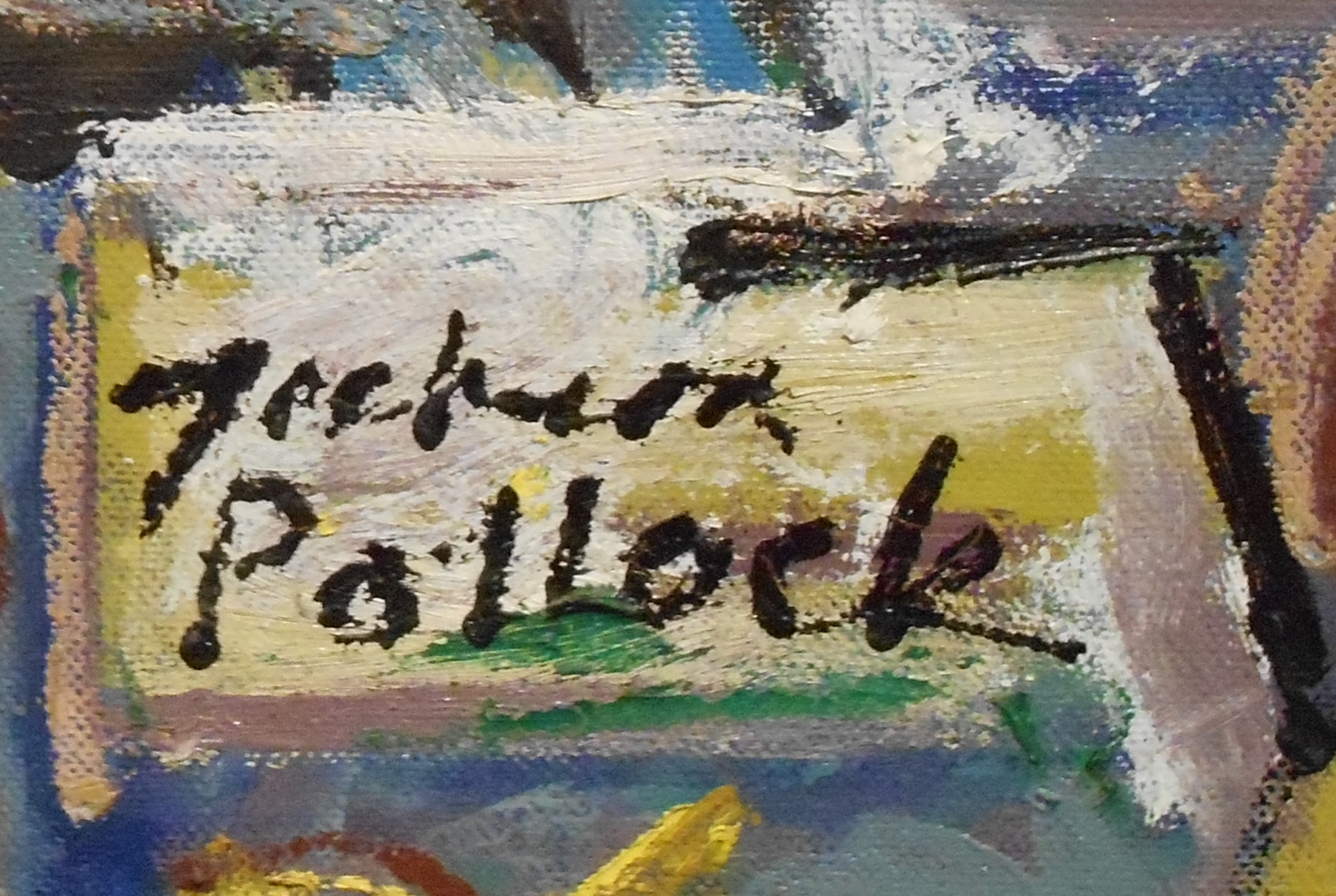
Signature of Jackson Pollock on Pasiphaë (1943; Metropolitan Museum of Art)

The show didn't sell well, but it proved to be a critical success. Reviewing the show in The New Yorker, critic Robert Coates wrote, “At Art of This Century there is what seems to be an authentic discovery—the paintings of Jackson Pollock.” Clement Greenberg, who would become Pollock's chief champion, wrote in The Nation that some of the paintings in the show “are among the strongest abstract paintings I have yet seen by an American,” adding, “Pollock has gone through the influences of Miró, Picasso, Mexican painting, and what not, and has come out on the other side at the age of thirty-one, painting mostly with his own brush.” In May 1944, the Museum of Modern Art purchased The She-Wolf for $400, making it the first work by Pollock to enter a museum collection.

Peggy Guggenheim closed Art of This Century on May 31, 1947, and moved back to Europe. (She and Jackson Pollock would never see each other again). Pollock moved to the Betty Parsons Gallery and, as he had with his first show for Guggenheim, he introduced a new style in his first show for Parsons. This one would radically change the course of modern art.

=== Cultural breakthrough ===
Much has been written about which painters first used the poured or drip technique in their works. “But,” writes William Rubin, “to the extent that it was not the dripping, pouring, staining or spattering per se, but what Pollock did with them that counted, all these arguments are beside the point” (italics Rubin's). He points to “Pollock’s radical challenge to [the viewers’] accepted notions of painting.” Varnedoe writes: “Pollock in 1947 ruptured the existing definitions of how art could be made, and offered a new model of how one could be an artist.” “Hanging on the walls of the Parsons Gallery at 15 West Fifty-seventh Street,” Ellen Landau writes, “were thirteen new canvases the likes of which New York had never seen.” The paintings were examples of Pollock's “allover” style of painting, “which has been hailed—not without reason—as the most striking innovation in pictorial space since Picasso’s and Braque’s analytical Cubist paintings of 1911,” according to critic Robert Hughes.

Even though Pollock's final show at Peggy Guggenheim's gallery was a success, his opening show for Betty Parsons (in January 1948) was a failure. Critics were “nonplussed.” Coates, who had been supportive of Pollock's earlier work, wrote in The New Yorker, “Pollock is much harder to understand than most of his confreres.” Of some of the works he wrote “only that they seem mere unorganized explosions of random energy, and therefore meaningless.” A critic writing in The Art Digest quipped that Pollock must have painted the pictures “while staring steadily up into the sky” and that the effort must have resulted “in the severest pain in the neck since Michelangelo painted the Sistine Ceiling.” Artnews called the work “lightweight.” Greenberg, however, maintained his support. “Jackson Pollock’s most recent show, at Betty Parsons’s, signals another step forward on his part.” He said the best works from this show have “style, harmony, and the inevitability of . . . logic. The combination of all three of these latter qualities, to be seen eminently in the strongest picture of the present show, Cathedral—a matter of much white, less black, and some aluminum paint—reminds one of Picasso’s and Braque’s masterpieces of the 1912-15 phase of cubism.” (Naifeh and Smith maintain that this was not the case, that Pollock was more interested in Picasso’s work from the 1920s and '30s, but that as long as the publicity was good, he “gladly went along.”)

National media now began to pick up the story. Varnedoe writes, “From scans of the press both local and foreign, Time and Life picked up the praise Pollock was receiving from Greenberg and others, and saw the potential for amusement in the seemingly crazy drip paintings.” In October 1947, Greenberg had written in the British journal Horizon, “Significantly and peculiarly, the most powerful painter in contemporary America and the only one who promises to be a major one is a Gothic, morbid and extreme disciple of Picasso's Cubism and Miró's post-Cubism, tinctured also with Kandinsky and Surrealist inspiration. His name is Jackson Pollock.” Time noted Greenberg's essay in a short article “scornfully” titled, “The Best?”

Varnedoe says that while “Time was consistently snide and dismissive (it immortalized the sobriquet ‘Jack the Dripper’), the editors at Life saw a chance to play both sides.” In October of 1948 (three months before Pollock’s second Parsons show), Life published the proceedings from a symposium they had sponsored that gathered “sixteen critics in the penthouse of the Museum of Modern Art . . . to comment on various works by French and American painters.” (Participants included Greenberg, Meyer Schapiro, Aldous Huxley, and H. W. Janson.) One painting was Pollock's drip-style Cathedral, which one professor from Yale University mused might make a “pleasant design for a necktie” and which Huxley said would make good wallpaper. Life reported that Greenberg considered Cathedral a "first-class example of Pollock's work, and one of the best paintings recently produced in this country.”

The following year Life played it both ways again, with the famous article in the August 8, 1949, issue on Pollock alone. While the text of the article, by Dorothy Seiberling, was relatively respectful and evenhanded, the captions were snarky and the title could be read in two ways: “Is He the Greatest Living Painter in the United States?” Varnedoe writes that the title “was likely intended as a can-you-believe-it laugh line.”

“Despite the mocking tone of this story,” Landau writes, “it stirred up critical and collector interest.” The Pollock shows at Parsons that followed each of the Life articles (January 1949 and November 1949, respectively) sold well. And critics who had been dismissive started to come around. Naifeh and Smith note that the Magazine of Art, which had earlier compared Pollock's work to baked macaroni, now described Pollock's work as “beautiful and subtle patterns of pure form.” Coates wrote in The New Yorker that “although he still avoids anything approaching the representational, the new work has a feeling of depth and a sense of stricter organization that add greatly to its appeal. . . . They seem to me the best painting he has yet done.” It was at the opening of the third Parsons show (the one following the solo Life article) that Willem de Kooning, seeing important collectors in the gallery, said, “Look around. These are the big shots. Jackson has finally broken the ice.”

Oddly, Greenberg did not cover the third Parsons show, nor did he cover the monumental fourth Parsons show of November–December 1950.

Pollock's fourth show at the Betty Parsons Gallery, running from November 28 to December 16, 1950, was the greatest exhibition of his career. This was the show where Pollock introduced his three monumental, wall-size canvases. (Rubin notes that along with the Peggy Guggenheim Mural of 1943-4 and two later works (Convergence and Blue Poles) these paintings “complete the surprisingly short list of wall-size pictures” by Pollock.) Varnedoe identifies the “three immense masterpieces Pollock realized in swift succession” in the late summer and autumn of 1950: Number 32, 1950, One: Number 31, 1950, and Autumn Rhythm: Number 30, 1950. (The paintings were indeed completed in this order, their numerical designations notwithstanding; more on this below in the “Title” section.) Varnedoe declares that “Pollock’s career without the three huge canvases he executed in the summer and autumn of 1950 would be akin to Géricault’s without The Raft of the Medusa.” To the list of the “big three,” Rubin and Naifeh and Smith each add Lavender Mist.

The exhibition was voted the second-best one-man show of the season by Artnews, behind John Marin and ahead of Alberto Giacometti. In one of the great ironies of art history, only one painting from the show sold: Lavender Mist.

== The painting ==
=== Facture and composition ===
Like most of Pollock's paintings from this period, Lavender Mist was painted on the floor of his barn studio in Springs, Long Island, using oil, enamel and aluminum paint poured onto unprimed canvas with dried, hardened brushes and sticks. While not as large as the “big three,” at 7’ 3” x 9’ 10” it is still characterized as a wall-size painting (as illustrated in the photo). Regarding the colors, the National Gallery states, "Black, blue, white, silver, russet, and orange paint are here, but no lavender."

Lavender Mist was painted in the summer of 1950, just before the “big three.” It can be seen leaning against a wall in Hans Namuth’s photos of Pollock, who was working on One when Namuth arrived. In the catalogue for the 1998-99 Pollock retrospective at the Museum of Modern Art, assistant curator Pepe Karmel analyzes Namuth’s photos to show that Number 27, 1950 (Whitney Museum of American Art) and Autumn Rhythm began with abstract figures in black, which were covered over by subsequent skeins of paint. It can be confidently assumed that Lavender Mist was also started by Pollock with anthropomorphic figures before he covered them up. In their discussion of Lavender Mist, Naifeh and Smith say that a “skeleton of black lines almost disappeared behind a luminous pastel cloud.” Varnedoe compares Pollock's process of starting with a “loosely cartooned figure or animal” to “an athlete doing warm-ups or a musician running scales.”

As in Pollock's earlier Number 1A, 1948 (Museum of Modern Art), though not as prominently, hand prints appear in Lavender Mist, in the upper left-hand corner. The National Gallery suggests these could be read as the artist's “signature.” The painting is signed and dated at the bottom edge: “Jackson Pollock 50.”

Numerous scholars use the term “pulverize” (or “pulverization”) to describe Pollock's drip paintings, often with specific reference to Lavender Mist. Greenberg wrote in 1958, “[I]n several of his huge ‘sprinkled’ canvases of 1950—One and Lavender Mist—as well as in Number 1 (1948), he had literally pulverized value contrasts in a vaporous dust of interfused lights and darks in which every suggestion of a sculptural effect was obliterated.” In 1970, Irving Sandler wrote, “Whereas Mondrian focused on the structure of Cubism and deliberately pushed it to a purist extreme, Pollock used automatism to pulverize Cubist design into active arabesques.” Landau (1989) writes: “Elaborated from point to point into a more minutely detailed and tightly woven composition than One, Lavender Mist appears to emit into the surrounding air a suffused haze of finely pulverized opalescent color.” And Varnedoe, when discussing the three large-scale works of 1950, notes the “combination of maximum expansiveness and partial recoil that moved these wall-to-wall creations beyond the extreme point of allover ‘pulverization’ and saturated fine-grain interlace that had marked Lavender Mist: Number 1, 1950 earlier that same year.” Varnedoe appears to be referencing A.E. Carmean’s use of the term in a 1978 exhibition catalogue, however he does not cite a source in a footnote. None of the other scholars cite Greenberg as the first to use the term.

In his review of the 1950 show for The New Yorker, Coates called Lavender Mist “lacy and delicate.” In his discussion of the relationship between Impressionism and Pollock's allover style, Rubin places Lavender Mist closer to the more painterly style of Impressionism than the more open, linear Autumn Rhythm. Landau confirms that Pollock would not have seen Monet’s late, large waterlilies, but she agrees with Rubin when she writes that “the affinities between Lavender Mist and the late Monet are so obvious that, at the very least, they suggest a parallel approach. For instance, the equability of tone and texture, the evocation of mood through color, and the micronization of form in Lavender Mist are remarkably reminiscent of the most advanced works of Monet. In contrast to the sublime fury of many earlier allovers such as Number 1A, Lavender Mist, like the Impressionists’ work, shows Pollock evoking nature's transcendent beauty, combining feeling and sense perception into a lyrical visual totality.”

Landau says, “Although Impressionism is usually defined as a realistic mode, Monet’s relatively indistinct late compositions, including most of the waterlilies, can for all intents and purposes be considered abstract,” and she notes that “Pollock’s work actually had an important impact on the rehabilitation of Monet’s reputation in the early fifties.”

For his part, Pollock said that his paintings “should be enjoyed just as music is enjoyed—after a while you may like it or you may not. But—it doesn’t seem to be too serious. I like some flowers and others, other flowers I don’t like.” When Seiberling of Life magazine asked him how he would respond to his critics, Pollock replied, “If they’d leave most of their stuff . . . at home and just look at the painting, they’d have no trouble enjoying it. It’s just like looking at a bed of flowers. You don’t tear your hair out over what it means.”

=== Title ===
Pollock started numbering his paintings in lieu of titles in 1949, although some numbered paintings were subsequently given titles. Number 1, 1950 was given the title Lavender Mist by Clement Greenberg. (Pollock often let others title his paintings, even before he started numbering them. The titles for the paintings in Pollock's first drip show were provided by the Pollocks’ East Hampton neighbor Ralph Manheim.) It should also be noted that the numbers do not necessarily denote the sequence in which the paintings were completed. Number 32, 1950 was completed before Number 31, 1950 (One), which was completed before Number 30, 1950 (Autumn Rhythm). And Number 1, 1950 was painted after Number 28, 1950. Finally, Number 1, 1950 is distinct from One: Number 31, 1950. (Landau says the title of the latter “was a subjective, not a numerical designation.”)

== Provenance ==
Lavender Mist was bought by Pollock's friend and neighbor, painter Alfonso Ossorio, from the Betty Parsons Gallery in 1950 for $1,500. It was purchased from Ossorio by the National Gallery of Art in 1976 for an undisclosed sum.

== In popular media ==
Lavender Mist was featured in a fashion photo spread by Cecil Beaton in the March 1951 issue of Vogue magazine.
