= Fractal expressionism =

Art style

Fractal expressionism is used to distinguish fractal art generated directly by artists from fractal art generated using mathematics and/or computers. Fractals are patterns that repeat at increasingly fine scales and are prevalent in natural scenery (examples include clouds, rivers, and mountains). Fractal expressionism implies a direct expression of nature's patterns in an art work.

== Jackson Pollock's poured paintings ==
The initial studies of fractal expressionism focused on the poured paintings by Jackson Pollock (1912–1956), whose work has traditionally been associated with the abstract expressionist movement. Pollock's patterns had previously been referred to as “natural” and “organic”, inviting speculation by John Briggs in 1992 that Pollock's work featured fractals. In 1997, Taylor built a pendulum device called the Pollockizer which painted fractal patterns bearing a similarity to Pollock's work. Computer analysis of Pollock's work published by Taylor et al. in a 1999 Nature article found that Pollock's painted patterns have characteristics that match those displayed by nature's fractals. This analysis supported clues that Pollock's patterns are fractal and reflect "the fingerprint of nature".

Taylor noted several similarities between Pollock's painting style and the processes used by nature to construct its landscapes. For instance, he cites Pollock's propensity to revisit paintings that he had not adjusted in several weeks as being comparable to cyclic processes in nature, such as the seasons or the tides. Furthermore, Taylor observed several visual similarities between the patterns produced by nature and those produced by Pollock as he painted. He points out that Pollock abandoned the use of a traditional frame for his paintings, preferring instead to roll out his canvas on the floor; this, Taylor asserts, is more compatible with how nature works than traditional painting techniques because the patterns in nature's scenery are not artificially bounded.

The perceived similarities between the processes and patterns involved in Pollock's paintings and those of nature compelled Taylor to posit that the same "basic trademark" of nature's pattern construction also appears in Pollock's work. Since some natural fractals are generated by a process known as "chaos", including fractals in human physiology, Taylor believed that Pollock's painting process might also have been chaotic, and could therefore leave behind a fractal pattern. Taylor's hypothesis seems to be reflected in Pollock's statement "I am nature", which he made when asked if nature was a source of inspiration for his work. Furthermore, Pollock is also quoted as stating "No chaos, damn it", in response to a Time magazine article that referred to his paintings as "chaotic". However, chaos theory was not understood until after Pollock's death, so he could not have been referring to the chaotic systems in nature but rather its common usage to mean disorder. In the famous film footage of Hans Namuth, Pollock says his paintings are no accident, and that he was able to control the flow of paint onto the canvas.

Taylor points to two aspects of Pollock's painting process that have the potential to introduce fractal patterns. The first is Pollock's motion as he moved around the canvas, which Taylor hypothesized followed a Levy flight, a type of chaotic motion that is known to leave behind a fractal pattern. More specifically, a number of studies have shown that the motions associated with human balance have fractal characteristics. The second source of chaos could be introduced through Pollock's pouring technique. Falling fluid has the capability of changing from a non-chaotic to a chaotic flow, meaning that Pollock could have introduced a chaotic flow of paint as he dripped it onto the canvas. Although the fractal characteristics of human balance and falling liquid are generated on Pollock's painting time and length scales, Predrag Cvitanovic notes that it would be quite an artistic challenge to control them: such parameters "are in no sense observable and measurable on the length-scales and time-scales dominated by chaotic dynamics".

Since Taylor's initial Pollock analysis in 1999, more than ten research groups have used various forms of fractal analysis to successfully quantify Pollock's work. In addition to analyzing Pollock's work for fractal content, some groups such as that of computer scientist Bruce Gooch, have used computers to generate Pollock-like images by varying their fractal characteristics. Benoit Mandelbrot (who invented the term fractal) and art theorist Francis O’Connor (the chief Pollock scholar) are well known advocates of fractal expressionism.

== The relationship between fractal expressionism and fractal fluency ==
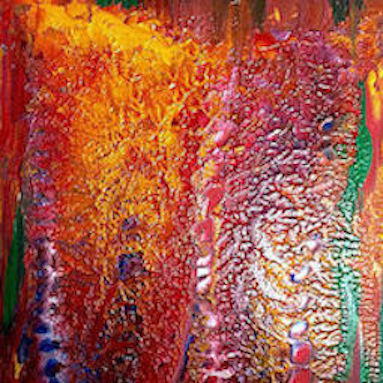
Abstract fractal expressionist painting by artist Paul Sanders

Fractal fluency is a neuroscience model that proposes that, through exposure to nature's fractal scenery, people's visual systems have adapted to efficiently process fractals with ease. This adaptation occurs at many stages of the visual system, from the way people's eyes move to which regions of the brain get activated. Fluency puts the viewer in a ‘comfort zone’ so inducing an aesthetic experience. Neuroscience experiments have shown that Pollock's paintings induce the same positive physiological responses in the observer as nature's fractals and mathematical fractals. This shows that fractal expressionism is related to fractal fluency by providing motivation for artists, such as Pollock, to use Fractal Expressionism in their art to appeal to people.

In light of fractal fluency and the associated aesthetics, other artists might be expected to display fractal expressionism. One year before Taylor's publication, mathematician Richard Voss quantified Chinese art using fractal analysis. Subsequently, other groups have used computer analysis to identify fractal content in a number of Western and Eastern artists, most recently in Willem De Kooning's work.

In addition to the above analyzed works, symbolic representations of fractals can be found in cultures across the continents spanning several centuries, including Roman, Egyptian, Aztec, Incan and Mayan civilizations. They frequently predate patterns named after the mathematicians who subsequently developed their visual characteristics. For example, although von Koch is famous for developing the Koch Curve in 1904, a similar shape featuring repeating triangles was first used to depict waves in friezes by Hellenic artists (300 B.C.E.). In the 13th century, repetition of triangles in Cosmati mosaics generated a shape later known in mathematics as the Sierpinski Triangle (named after Sierpinski's 1915 pattern).

Triangular repetitions are also found in the 12th century pulpit of the Ravello Cathedral in Italy. The lavish artwork within the Book of Kells (circa 800 C.E.) and the sculpted arabesques in the Jain Dilwara Temple in Mount Abu, India (1031 C.E.) also both reveal stunning examples of exact fractals.

The artistic works of Leonardo da Vinci and Katsushika Hokusai serve as more recent examples from Europe and Asia, each reproducing the recurring patterns that they saw in nature. Da Vinci's sketch of turbulence in water, The Deluge (1571–1518), was composed of small swirls within larger swirls of water. In The Great Wave off Kanagawa (1830–1833), Hokusai portrayed a wave crashing on a shore with small waves on top of a large wave. Other woodcuts from the same period also feature repeating patterns at several size scales: The Ghost of Kohada Koheiji shows fissures in a skull and The Falls at Mt. Kurokami features branching channels in a waterfall.

== The use of fractals to authenticate art ==
Voss's 1998 study of Chinese art was the first demonstration of using fractal analysis to distinguish between the works of different artists. Following Taylor's 1999 Pollock publication, Art conservator Jim Coddington proposed that fractal analysis should be explored as a technique to help authenticate Pollock paintings. In 2005, Taylor and colleagues published a fractal analysis of 14 authentic and 37 imitation Pollocks suggesting that, when combined with other techniques, fractal analysis might be useful for authenticating Pollock's work. In the same year, The Pollock-Krasner Foundation requested a fractal analysis to be used for the first time in an authenticity dispute, The analysis identified “significant deviations from Pollock’s characteristics.” Taylor cautioned that the results should be “coupled with other important information such as provenance, connoisseurship and materials analysis.” Two years later, materials scientists showed that pigments on the paintings dated from after Pollock's death.

In 2006, the use of fractals to authenticate Pollocks stirred controversy. This controversy was triggered by physicists Katherine Jones-Smith and Harsh Mathur who claimed that the fractal characteristics identified by Taylor et al. are also present in crude sketches made in Adobe Photoshop, and deliberately fraudulent poured paintings made by other artists Thus, according to Jones-Smith and Mathur, labeling Pollock's paintings as "fractal" is meaningless, because the same characteristics are found in other non-fractal images. Taylor published his rebuttal in Nature, claiming that his group's fractal analysis could distinguish between Pollock paintings and the crude sketches, and identified further limitations in Jones-Smith and Mathur's analysis.

Jones-Smith and Mathur argued that the fractal characteristics observed in Pollock's paintings span too narrow a magnification range. When he introduced the definition of fractals, Benoit Mandelbrot excluded magnification range as a defining characteristic in order to accommodate physical fractals with more limited ranges than their mathematical counterparts. In his rebuttal, Taylor claimed that his use of "fractal" was consistent with that of the research community and that Jones-Smith and Mathur would similarly dismiss half of the published investigations on fractals based on their limited ranges. Mandelbrot summarized: “I do believe Pollocks are fractal”.

In 2015, computer scientist Lior Shamir showed that, when combined with other pattern parameters, fractal analysis can be used to distinguish between real and imitation Pollocks with 93% accuracy. He found that the fractal parameters were the most powerful contributors to the detection accuracy. Taylor's 2024 study used an artificial intelligence technique based on fractals to achieve a 99% success rate.
