= Robert Beverly Hale =

American artist and curator (1901–1985)

Robert Beverly Hale

Robert Beverly Hale (1901–November 14, 1985) was an artist, curator of American paintings at the Metropolitan Museum of Art, and instructor of artistic anatomy at the Art Students League of New York and the Pennsylvania Academy of Fine Art. He was also the author of the well-known book Drawing Lessons from the Great Masters, as well as the translator of the classic anatomy text Artistic Anatomy by Dr. Paul Richer.

== Life and career ==
Hale was born into a prominent family in Boston, Massachusetts. His grandfather was the clergyman and author Edward Everett Hale (1822–1909). Two of his father's siblings were well known artists: Ellen Day Hale and Philip Leslie Hale. He grew up in New York City and studied at Columbia University, where he did post-graduate work at the School of Architecture. He also studied at the Art Students League under George Bridgman and William McNulty, and at the Sorbonne in Paris.

From 1942 to 1949 Hale worked as Editorial Associate for Art News magazine. A long-time Instructor of Drawing and Lecturer on Anatomy at the Art Students League, and adjunct professor of drawing at Columbia, Hale taught and wrote on the principles of chiaroscuro and observation from life, encouraging his students to see and draw forms in nature as the geometric "mass conceptions" of cylinders, cubes, or spheres. His lectures at the League included demonstrations of life-size figure drawings, much as had those of his teacher and predecessor, George Brandt Bridgman.

Hale joined the staff of the Metropolitan Museum of Art in New York City in 1948 as the first curator of the department of contemporary American art, a position he held until 1966. Among his other accomplishments, Hale facilitated the Met's acquisition of Jackson Pollock's monumental poured painting Autumn Rhythm, 1950, amid opposition from the museum's trustees.

Hale's artwork was featured in one-man shows at the Stamford Museum and at the Staempfli Gallery in New York. In addition to several books on drawing, Hale authored numerous articles, including one on drawing in the Encyclopædia Britannica, and an entry on "The History of American Painting" for the Grolier Encyclopaedia. He also had verse and fiction published in The New Yorker and Mademoiselle magazines.

His careers as instructor, curator, and artist were apt to overlap: according to Hale, "One day in East Hampton de Kooning came up to my little studio there and said that I was ruining any number of people by telling them about anatomy".

In 1962 Hale married the former Nike Mylonas, an art historian and a daughter of archeologist George E. Mylonas. The Hales had two children, Alexander Curzon Hale and Evelyn Everett Hale. Hale died on November 14, 1985.

== Publications ==
- Anatomy Lessons from the Great Masters by Robert Beverly Hale and Terence Cole. New York: Watson-Guptill Publications, 1977. ISBN 0-8230-0222-5
- Drawing Lessons from the Great Masters by Robert Beverly Hale. New York: Wason-Guptill Publications, 1989. ISBN 0-8230-1401-0
- Artistic Anatomy by Dr. Paul Richer, translated by Robert Beverly Hale. New York: Watson Guptill Publications, 1971. ISBN 0-8230-0297-7
- Master Class in Figure Drawing by Robert Beverly Hale and Terence Cole. Watson-Guptill Publications, 1985. ISBN 0-8230-3014-8 (pbK) 0-8230-0224-1
