= The Deep (painting) =

Painting by Jackson Pollock

- Artist: Jackson Pollock
- Year: 1953
- Type: Oil and enamel on canvas
- Dimensions: 220.4 cm × 150.72 cm (86.8 in × 59.34 in)
- Location: Musée National d'Art Moderne, Paris

The Deep is an oil and enamel abstract expressionist painting by American artist Jackson Pollock, from 1953. It is held in the Musée National d'Art Moderne, in Paris.

== History and description ==
Pollock here uses a combination of dripping black and white paints, only to break it down with touches of yellow. There are many interpretations of the meaning of the painting, and the painting's name, most often as a deep and profound void or hole, even a vagina, a viscous cut, or a dying man.
