= Autumn Rhythm (Number 30) =

1950 painting by Jackson Pollock

- Artist: Jackson Pollock
- Year: 1950
- Medium: Enamel paint on canvas
- Movement: abstract expressionism, action painting
- Dimensions: 266.7 cm (105.0 in) × 525.8 cm (207.0 in)
- Location: Metropolitan Museum of Art

Autumn Rhythm (Number 30) is a 1950 abstract expressionist painting by American artist Jackson Pollock in the collection of the Metropolitan Museum of Art in New York City. The work is a distinguished example of Pollock's 1947-50 poured-painting style, and is often considered one of his most notable works.

== Creation ==
Autumn Rhythm was made in July and August of 1950 at Pollock's studio in Springs, New York, as part of a group of paintings he first exhibited at the Betty Parsons Gallery in November–December, 1950. Pollock's technique in the painting, like others made during this part of his career, involved working on unprimed canvas laid on the floor of his studio, pouring paint from cans or using sticks, heavily loaded brushes and other implements to control a stream of paint as he dripped and flung it onto the canvas. At 17 feet wide and 8 feet high, Autumn Rhythm is among Pollock's largest pictures. It belongs to a trio of "monumental canvases" Pollock painted in the summer of 1950, along with Number 32, 1950 and One: Number 31, 1950.

The creation of Autumn Rhythm was partly documented by Hans Namuth, who photographed Pollock at work over several months in 1950. According to art historian Monica Bohm-Duchen, Namuth's photographs lend insight to the sequence in which Pollock filled in the canvas, and the order in which paint colors were applied to the work. Pollock began by painting the right third of the canvas, laying down a skein of thin black lines, and then adding other colors of paint (mostly browns and white, with a small amount of teal blue) using several methods of dripping and pouring to create a variety of types of lines and puddled areas of paint until the section began to resemble its finished state. He then moved on to the center section, and ultimately the left-hand section using the same process. Throughout the making of the work, he painted from all sides of the canvas.

== Title and exhibition ==
Pollock gave the painting the title Number 30, and it was exhibited under that name at the Betty Parsons Gallery in 1950, and at the Museum of Modern Art as part of its 15 Americans exhibition in 1952. From 1947 to 1952, Pollock gave his works numbers rather than titles in order not to distract viewers with implied meanings. The numbered titles do not appear to correspond to the sequence in which works were made. When the picture was shown at the Sidney Janis Gallery in 1955, it carried the title Autumn Rhythm with no reference to the number. Pollock did not record why he changed the title of the painting; art historian Timothy J. Clark believes that Autumn Rhythm was Pollock's own title, in contrast to some other works of this period, which received title suggestions from Pollock's friend, critic Clement Greenberg. In 1957, the Metropolitan Museum of Art acquired the painting from Pollock's estate for $20,000 plus a trade of a work already in the Met collection, Number 17, 1951. Met curator Robert Beverly Hale proposed and supervised the acquisition. Since then, the work has generally been exhibited as Autumn Rhythm (Number 30).

== Legacy ==
Researchers looking at the underlying fractal geometry of Pollock's work have estimated the fractal dimension of the drip patterns in Autumn Rhythm at 1.67.
