= University of Iowa Stanley Museum of Art =

Art museum in Iowa

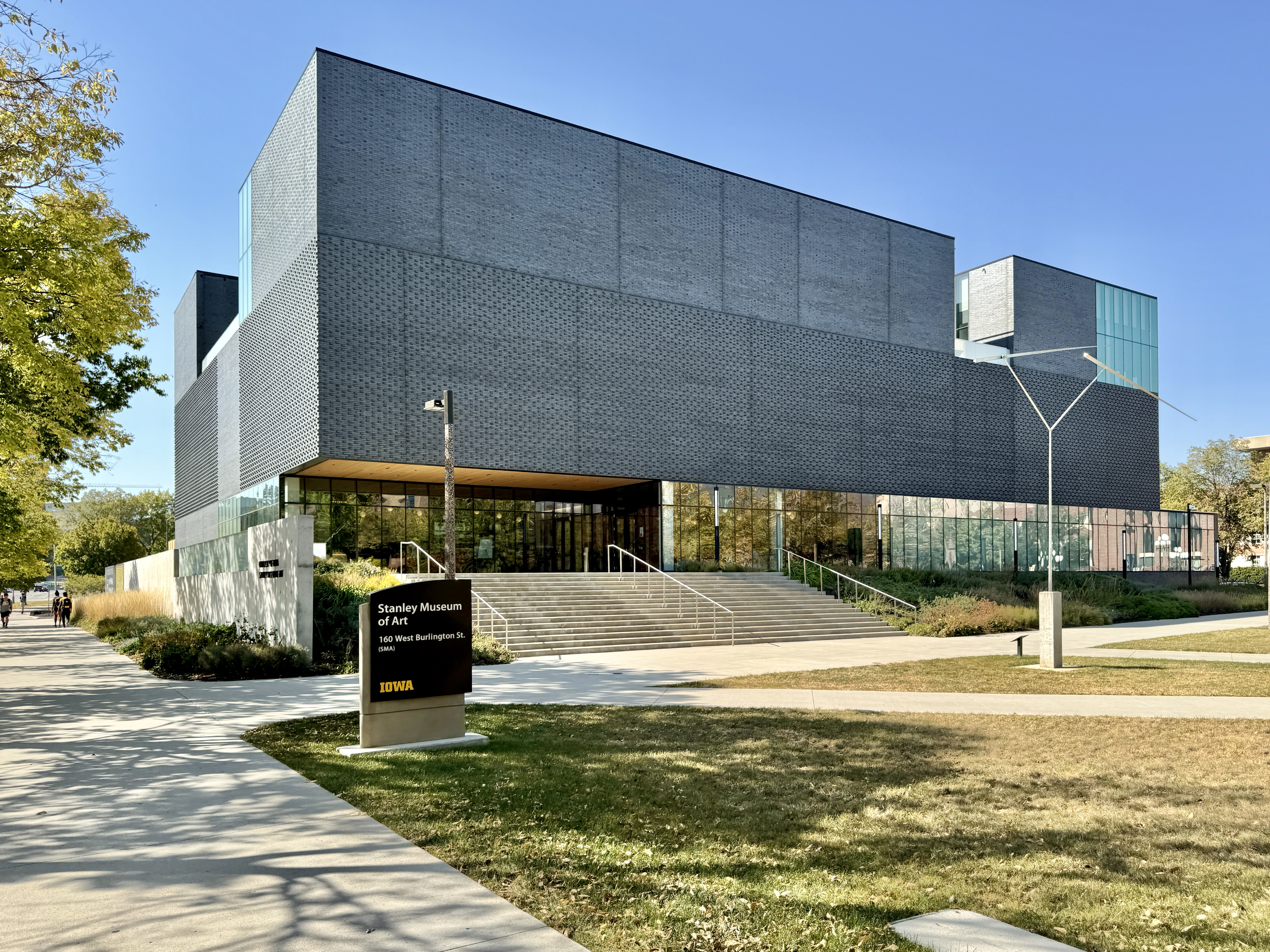
- Former name: University of Iowa Museum of Art
- Established: 1969
- Location: University of Iowa Iowa City, Iowa, US
- Coordinates: 41.65840530395508°N 91.53895568847656°W
- Type: Art museum
- Collections: Modern Art Contemporary Art Ceramics Drawings Prints Photography African Art Oceanic Art Indigenous Art of the Americas Asian Art Textiles
- Collection size: The University of Iowa Stanley Museum of Art’s permanent collection encompasses over sixteen thousand artworks.
- Visitors: 45,000 (2026)
- Director: Lauren Lessing
- Curators: Cory Gundlach - Curator of African Art Derek (DK) Nnuro - Curator of Special Projects Diana Tuite - Visiting Senior Curator of Modern and Contemporary Art
- Architects: BNIM Iowa; lead, Rod Kruse
- Public transit access: University of Iowa CAMBUS Red, Blue, and Interdorm routes all stop at the UI Main Library, immediately adjacent to the museum.
- Website: stanleymuseum.uiowa.edu

The University of Iowa Stanley Museum of Art is a visual arts institution that is part of the University of Iowa in Iowa City, Iowa, United States. It is accredited by the American Alliance of Museums.

Since its inception, the museum has partnered in many teaching programs and research projects with the University of Iowa School of Art and Art History, and for several decades has sponsored the annual MFA show as well as the faculty exhibitions. Faculty from the SAAH and elsewhere, and graduate students on campus have curated shows at the museum that are closely linked with their research, courses, and seminars. The teaching mission of the Stanley Museum of Art embraces the curriculum of the University of Iowa and extends throughout the state.

== Collections ==
The University of Iowa Stanley Museum of Art, established in 1969, has one of the top university art collections in the country. Approximately 17,000 objects constitute its collections, including paintings, sculpture, prints, drawings, photographs, ceramics, textiles, jadeware and silverware.

A number of major art donors contributed to the collection, including Peggy Guggenheim, Owen and Leone Elliott, and Elizabeth M. and C. Maxwell Stanley. The Guggenheim donation includes masterpieces by Pollock, Matta, Seliger, and Rice Pereira. The Elliott Collection includes paintings by Braque, Chagall, De Chirico, Kandinsky, Léger, Marc, Matisse, Picasso, and Vlaminck, among others. The Stanley Collection of African Art is part of one of the most significant collections of African art in the country which today numbers almost 2,000 objects. Other significant areas of the collections include nearly 5,300 prints spanning the history of Western printmaking, several hundred ceramics (primarily American studio ceramics), Pre-Columbian objects as well as groups of ancient Etruscan and Roman art, and Native American ledger drawings.

Two of the most well-known works in the collections were given to the museum by the School of Art and Art History: Max Beckmann’s triptych, Karneval, purchased by the faculty in 1946, and one of the most famous paintings by Jackson Pollock, Mural, created in 1943 for Peggy Guggenheim and gifted to the university in 1951. Significant paintings by Robert Motherwell, Lyonel Feininger, Maurice Prendergast, Alexej von Jawlensky, Joan Miró, Marsden Hartley, Stuart Davis, Grant Wood, Philip Guston, Ad Reinhardt, Richard Diebenkorn, Yasuo Kuniyoshi, Arthur Dove, Giorgio Morandi, Mark Rothko, Miriam, and Sam Gilliam, as well as sculptural/3-D works by Louise Nevelson, Sol LeWitt, Mark di Suvero, Beverly Pepper, Henry Moore, Marcel Duchamp, Lil Picard, Alexander Calder, Peter Voulkos, and George Rickey add to the museum's offerings.

== History ==
=== Building the museum ===
In the early 1960s, Owen and Leone Elliott of Cedar Rapids, Iowa, offered the university their extensive collection of 20th-century paintings, prints, antique silver, and jade on the condition that a museum be built to house their gift, along with the university's existing and future acquisitions of art. In response to this challenge, more than 2000 individuals and businesses contributed funds for the museum's construction.

The University of Iowa Museum of Art (UIMA) opened in 1969, although the art collections of the University of Iowa predate the museum by several decades. During the 1940s and 1950s, the university's School of Art and Art History presented exhibitions of contemporary art and acquired works from these exhibitions. Many of the museum's most important paintings were acquired during these years, including Max Beckmann's Karneval, and Joan Miró's 1939 A Drop of Dew Falling from the Wing of a Bird Awakens Rosalie Asleep in the Shade of a Cobweb. Jackson Pollock's Mural was given to the university by Peggy Guggenheim in 1953.

A gift from the late industrialist Roy Carver, of Muscatine, Iowa, made possible the construction of a major addition, which opened in 1976 and housed the University of Iowa Foundation and the University of Iowa Alumni Association in addition to portions of the museum. Maxwell and Elizabeth Stanley also of Muscatine, collected African art throughout the 1970s and in 1979; most of their collection came to the museum.

=== Renovation ===
The Alumni Association and UI Foundation moved out in 1999, leaving the entire 70,000 square feet (6,500 m^{2}) of the building to the UI Museum of Art. In the summer of 2003, the long-awaited renovation of the former Alumni Center, or north wing, of the building began. Nearly 30,000 square feet (2,800 m^{2}) of the building was gutted and substantial changes were made to the mechanical systems and spaces in the basement as well. The kitchens, offices, meeting rooms, etc. left behind by the UI Foundation and Alumni Association became galleries, store rooms, and work spaces.

The North Gallery for Special Exhibitions debuted in the Fall of 2004, along with a remodeled Lasansky Room and the Nancy and Craig Willis Atrium. The old Print Study Room was converted into the Hoover-Paul Gallery for Works on Paper. The North Gallery added an additional 6,000 square feet (560 m^{2}) of exhibition space to the museum for a total of 30,000 square feet (2,800 m^{2}) for exhibitions.

=== Flood ===
In June 2008, the UIMA was flooded and forced to evacuate its collections. Working nearly non-stop during the week of June 9, the museum staff, art movers, and volunteers evacuated artworks totaling approximately 99 percent of the value of the collection before the floodwaters forced the closure of the UIMA on Friday, June 13.

In the weeks following the flood, the remaining art was evacuated to join the rest of the collection in secure art storage in Chicago. Meanwhile, the UIMA worked to secure alternative locations on- and off-campus to make the art accessible to its public.

In January 2009, the Figge Art Museum in Davenport offered the UIMA space in its building for storage and exhibitions until a permanent home on the UI campus became available. In March, the UIMA began moving its collection to the Figge. In July, the museum finished its initial inventory of the objects.

Overall, about 200 objects needed some form of treatment by the conservators at Chicago Conservation Center because of the flood. Nearly all have been cared for and are now in storage at the Figge. UIMA works already slated for conservation before the flood—mainly African objects—will remain in Chicago to receive the treatment they require.

=== Post-flood recovery ===
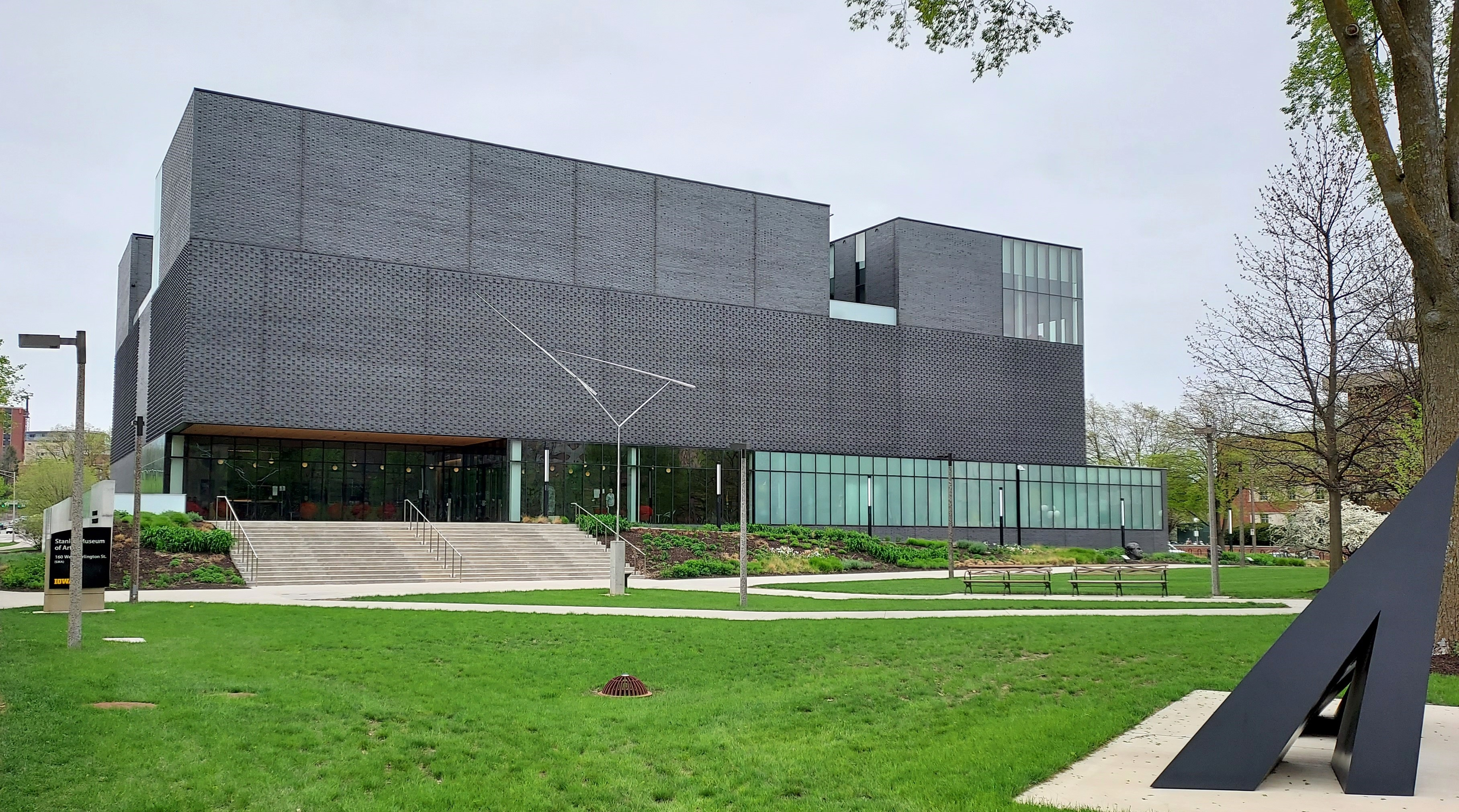
The museum and Gibson Square in 2025, with George Rickey's Two Lines Oblique in the background center and Beverly Pepper's Omega in the immediate foreground.

In August 2009, UI president Sally Mason announced the formation of an Envisioning Committee for the UIMA. Composed of community members, UI faculty, and UI students, the committee is charged with evaluating best practices for university and college art museums and thinking about how the UIMA can best serve the needs of its constituents moving forward. The Envisioning Committee delivered its report in early 2010.

In April 2018, the museum was renamed the University of Iowa Stanley Museum of Art following a major donation by Richard and Mary Jo Stanley. Construction of the new Stanley Museum of Art building began in fall of 2019, and it was opened to the public on August 26, 2022. The new building features more than 16,500 square feet of exhibition space (63,000 total square feet) along with additional outdoor gallery space.

Two Lines Oblique (1967–69), a mobile sculpture by George Rickey, was installed in front of the building's main entrance, overlooking Gibson Square. Among other sculpture on the grounds are Omega (1974) by Beverly Pepper and Oracle (1974) by Lila Katzen.

== Directors ==
Chief executive officers of the University of Iowa Stanley Museum of Art since its founding in 1969:

- Dr. Lauren Lessing (2018–present)
- Mr. Steve McGuire (Interim, 2018)
- Mr. James A. Leach (Interim, 2017–2018)
- Dr. Sean O'Harrow (2010–2017)
- Mr. Willard L. Boyd (Interim, 2010)
- Dr. Pamela White (Interim, 2008–2010)
- Dr. Howard Creel Collinson (2000–2008)
- Dr. Stephen Prokopoff (1992–2000)
- Ms. Mary K. Lyman (Interim, 1991–1992)
- Ms. Mary Roberts Kujawski (1988–1991)
- Dr. Robert Hobbs (1983–1988)
- Dr. Bruce W. Chambers (1980–1983)
- Ms. Jan K. Muhlert (1975–1979)
- Mr. Ulfert Wilke (1968–1975) with Gustave Von Groschwitz (1968–1974) serving as associate director

== Collection highlights ==
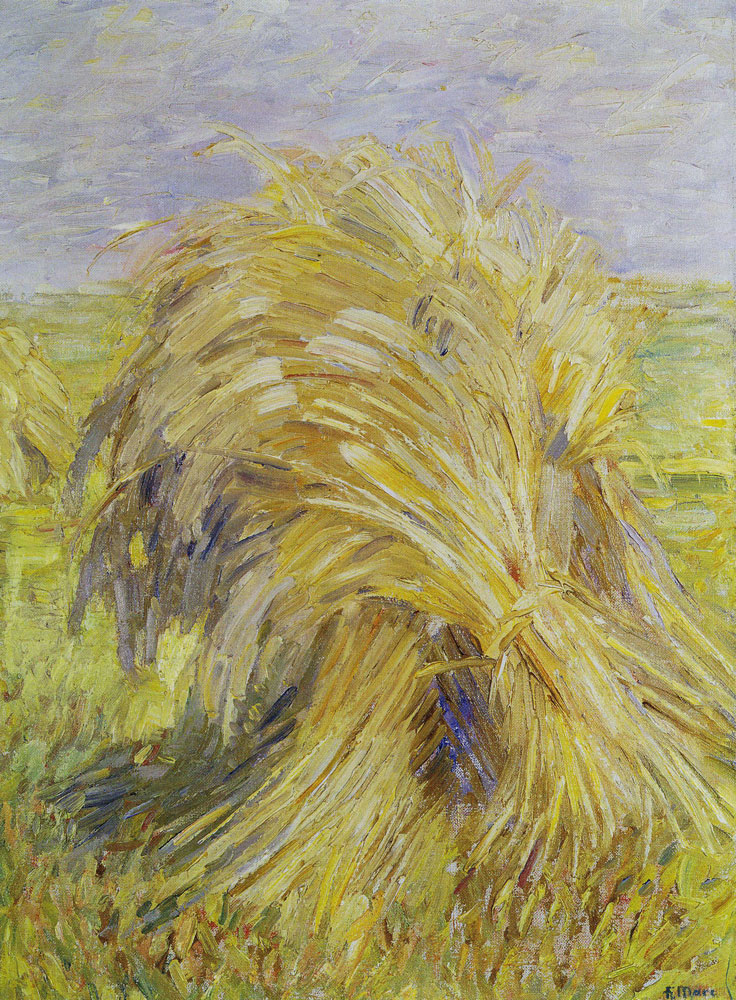
Franz Marc, Getreidegarben (Sheaves of Grain), 1907

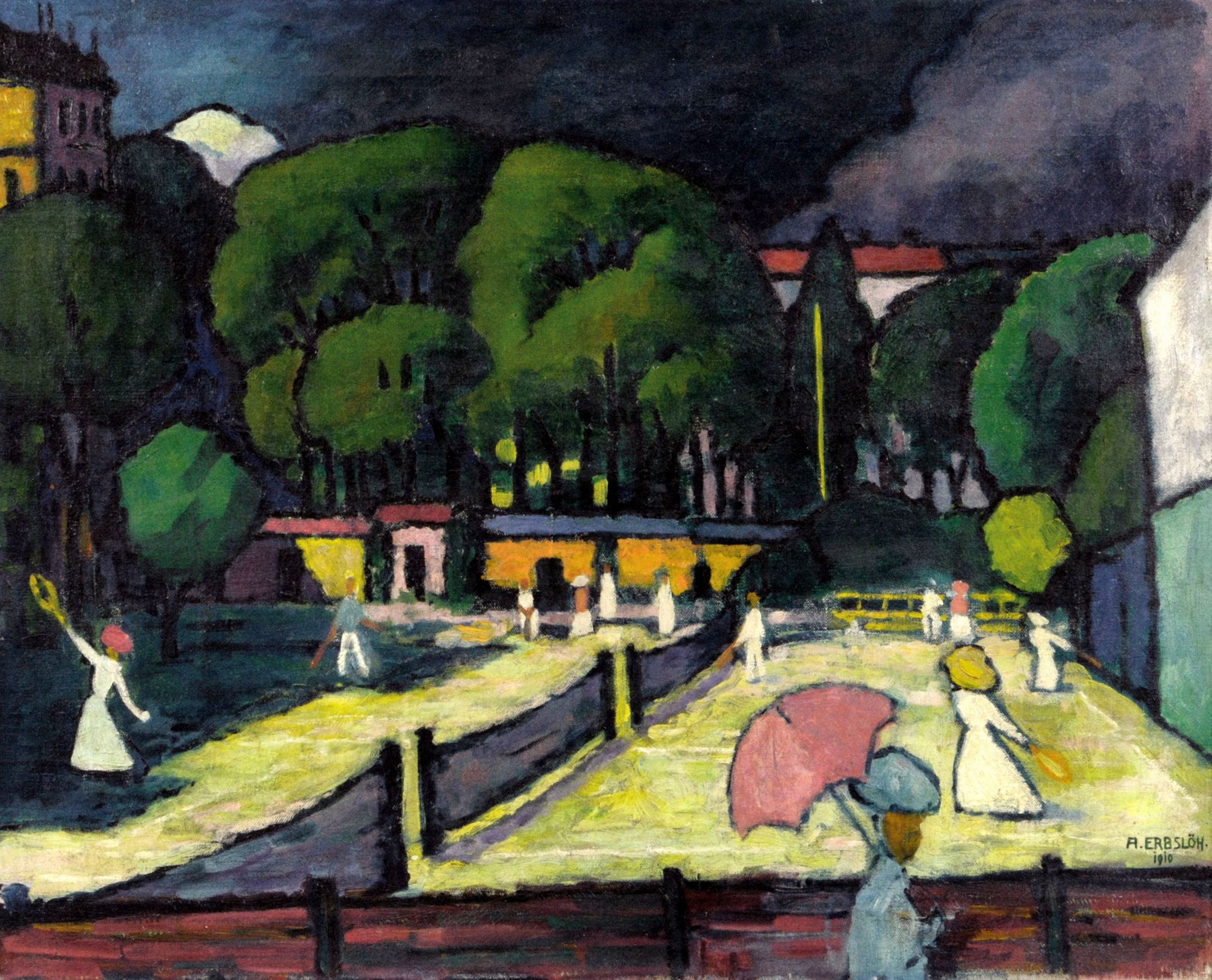
Adolf Erbslöh, Tennisplatz (Tennis Court), 1910

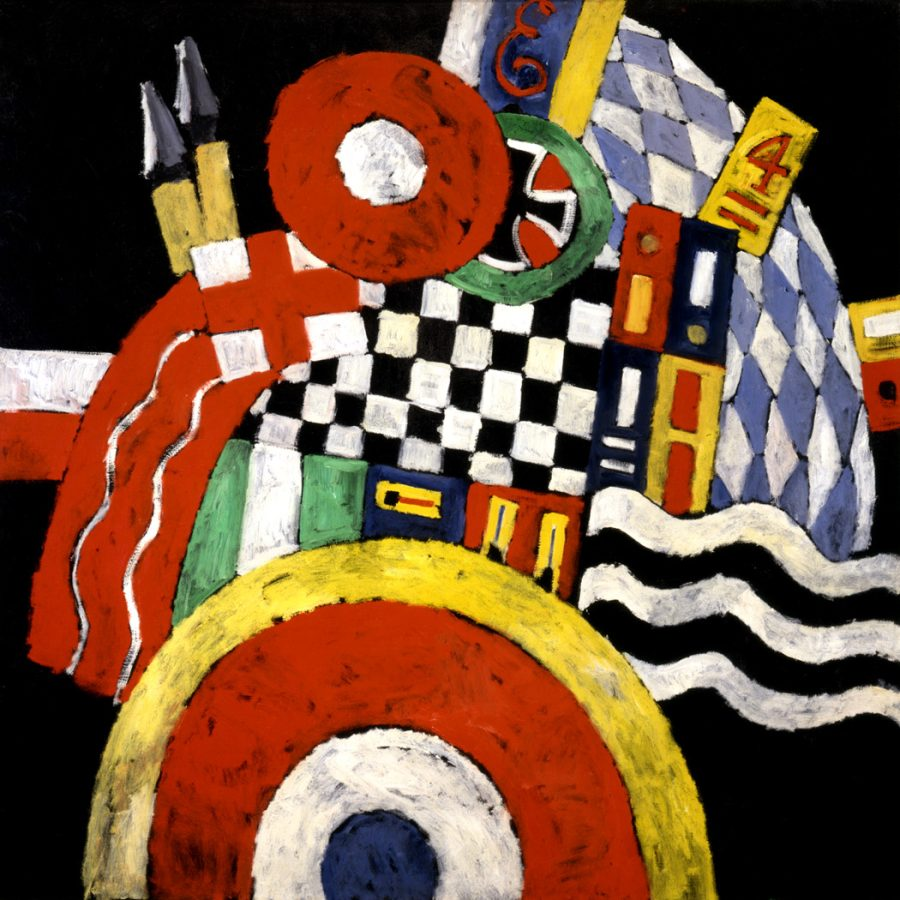
Marsden Hartley, E, 1915

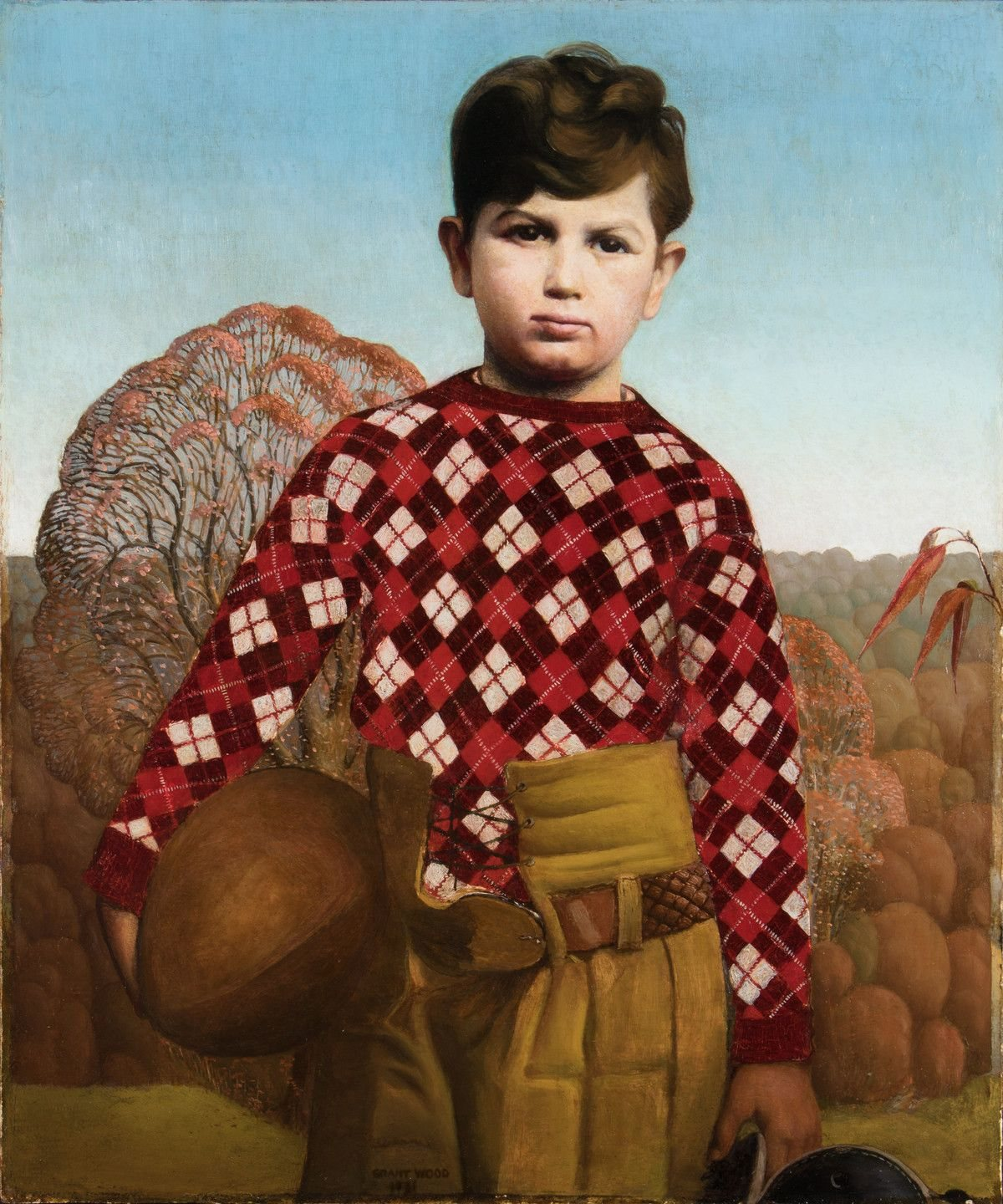
Grant Wood, Plaid Sweater, 1931

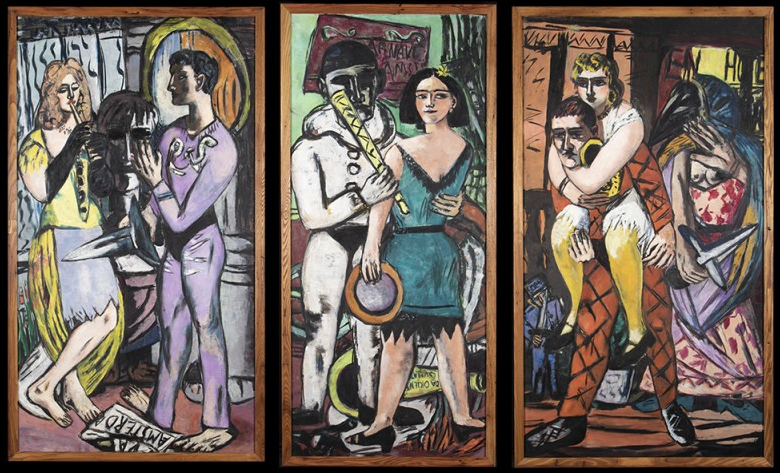
Max Beckmann, Karneval (Carnival), 1943
