= Gustave Von Groschwitz =

T. F. Gustave Von Groschwitz (April 16, 1906 – 1991) was an American art administrator who served as director of the Carnegie Museum of Art and associate director of the University of Iowa Stanley Museum of Art.

== Biography ==
Von Groschwitz was born on April 16, 1906, in New York City. He received his B.A. from Columbia University in 1927 and his M.A. from the New York University Institute of Fine Arts in 1949 with a thesis titled "The Original Lithograph in Color in the XIXth Century."

During the Great Depression, he served as the head of the graphics art division of the Federal Art Project in New York City. He was appointed curator of prints at Wesleyan University in 1938, and curator of prints of Cincinnati Art Museum in 1947, concurrently serving as an adjunct faculty member of the University of Cincinnati. He was made chief curator of the Cincinnati Art Museum and organized six international biennales of lithography.

From 1963 to 1968, he was the director of the Carnegie Museum of Art, and organized the 1964 and 1967 Carnegie International.

In 1968, he joined the faculty of the University of Iowa, where he was associate director of the University of Iowa Stanley Museum of Art, before retiring in 1974.

Von Groschwitz died in 1991.
