= One: Number 31, 1950 =

1950 painting by Jackson Pollock

External image
- https://www.moma.org/collection/works/78386

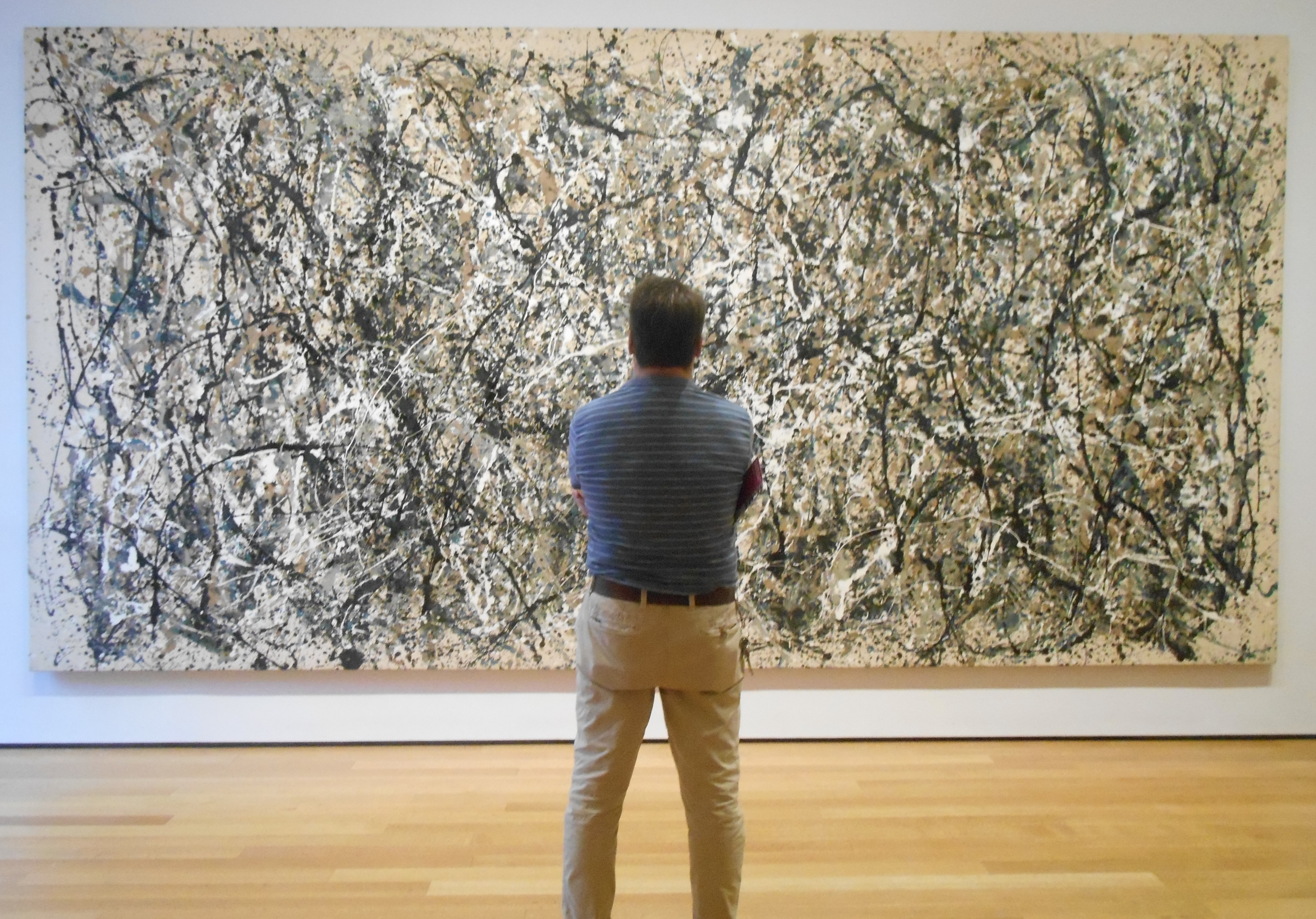
One: Number 31, 1950 in the Museum of Modern Art in 2013 (with observer)

One: Number 31, 1950 is a painting by American painter Jackson Pollock, from 1950. It is one of the largest and most prominent examples of the artist's Abstract Expressionist drip-style works. The work was owned by a private collector until 1968 when it was purchased by the Museum of Modern Art, in New York, where it has been displayed since then.

== Context and style ==
One: Number 31, 1950 is one of three larger-scale drip-style paintings, the other two being Autumn Rhythm (Number 30) and Number 32, 1950, that Pollock created in 1950 at his iconic barn studio in East Hampton, New York. In the summer of 1950, as One: Number 31, 1950 was being made, photographer Hans Namuth was invited to take photos documenting Pollock's studio and work. Upon arrival, Namuth was initially disappointed because Pollock stated the large oil and enamel paint-topped canvas was finished; however, this sense of dissatisfaction was short lived as Pollock spontaneously took his paintbrush and began slinging black, white, and brown paint onto the canvas in what Namuth recalled “a dancelike fashion.”

This complex mix of “tans, blues, and grays lashed through with black and white” of varying luster was the first of the many paintings that Namuth used to bring Pollock's drip-style painting, where Pollock used sticks, rigid brushes, and other instruments to fling and free handedly throw paint onto a canvas placed the floor beneath him, to the forefront of the art world. The painting constitutes one of the many examples of Pollock's contempt for the Surrealist concept of accident superseding human consciousness in creating art as his drip-style painting technique encapsulated random gravitational effects of paint being flung onto the canvas. Pollock felt that in all of his drip-style painting “there is no accident, just as there is no beginning and no end.” Additionally, while composing artwork like One: Number 31, 1950, Pollock had always been more comfortable on the floor as he stated, “I am more at ease. I feel nearer, more a part of the painting since this way I can walk around it, work from the four sides and literally be in the painting.”

== Symbolism ==
One: Number 31, 1950's juxtaposition of subdued colors with splattering of paint on top represents an indispensable example of Abstract Expressionist artwork. Art historian Stephen Policari considered Pollock's poured painting to represent “a kind of frozen dynamic equilibrium of endless rhythm and energy” and believed the different combinations of curves and straight lines interacted with each other in such a way that created a scheme of light and color so complex that it could not be described in the realm of Euclidean geometry.

Scholars at MoMA think Pollock's unparalleled skill was highlighted through the work's interwoven bands of color which they felt contributed an aura of power and fullness to the painting in its entirety while maintaining a sense of elegance and meticulousness in the details. MoMA scholars also emphasize a sense of fundamental order amidst the chaos and endlessness of One: Number 31, 1950 not containing any principle focal points or patterns; this serves as the foundation of interpretations of the painting in which it symbolized “the pulsing intensity of the modern city, the primal rhythms of nature, and even the infinite depths of the cosmos.”

Clement Greenberg initially suggested calling the painting Lowering Weather, but Pollock had other thoughts. Original owner Ben Heller remembers him saying, "Well, when I painted it, it was one of the most harmonious feelings that I've had during my life. It reminded me of back when I was riding the rails and I would see nature around me." Art historian Ellen Landau says it "was a subjective, not a numerical designation."

== Conservation and restoration ==
In 2013, One: Number 31, 1950 was taken down from its spot hanging in MoMA and placed on the ground horizontally, so that conservators could analyze the painting and prepare for its restoration. First, as the painting had only been dusted since entering MoMA's collection in 1968, it was cleaned with sponges and swabbed with a chemically adjusted water solution to remove a yellow grime layer and other accumulated dirt. In physical terms, the painting did not need to be changed as its stretcher held the painting at an appropriate tension, and the canvas was set with an unobtrusive layer of lining adhesive applied that prevented any acid transfer. However, this lining was an indication of prior treatment that would have been completed before 1968; since the conservation record for the painting was minimal before MoMA bought it, the painting may have undergone other treatment as well, so it was compared to a picture of it taken at a show in Portland, Oregon, in 1962 to look for discrepancies.

Conservators discovered that an area of cracking, which results from the natural degradation of the actual paint, had been covered with what was confirmed by X-radiograph, ultraviolet examination, Fourier transform infrared spectroscopy, and X-ray fluorescence spectrometry to be overpaint. Upon further examination and the addition of a chemical solvent, the white overpaint, which covered details of Pollock's work, was used more on the cracks than on losses in the paint layer. In a shift from the 1960s conservational value of a painting being immaculate without any signs of aging, MoMA conservators ultimately made the aesthetic choice to remove the white overpaint on the cracks and merely retouch them with watercolor paint to allow for minimal intrusion into the look of the original painting.

== Modern day ==
In 2019, One: Number 31, 1950 can be viewed at the MoMA by its more than 3 million annual visitors. Additionally, One: Number 31, 1950 is one of the many Pollock paintings that has undergone fractal analysis that is being used to prove the authenticity of other Pollock works as well as to contribute more insight into fractal geometry in general.
