= Carnegie International =

North American exhibition of contemporary art

Coordinates: 40.44353°N 79.94954°W

The Carnegie International is a North American exhibition of contemporary art from around the globe. It was first organized at the behest of industrialist and philanthropist Andrew Carnegie on November 5, 1896, in Pittsburgh. Carnegie established the International to educate and inspire the public as well as to promote international cooperation and understanding. He intended the International to provide a periodic sample of contemporary art from which Pittsburgh's Carnegie Museum of Art could enrich its permanent collection.

== History ==
Established in 1896 as the Annual Exhibition, the Carnegie International focused almost solely on painting until 1961. From 1955 through 1970, the show followed a triennial schedule; from 1961–1967, the exhibition was known as the Pittsburgh International Exhibition of Contemporary Painting and Sculpture.

The first exhibition was selected by Carnegie Museum of Art director John. W. Beatty, on his own; after that, works were selected in consultation with a group of foreign advisory committees and a jury of award. In the first decade, the exhibition selection system was two-tiered: some artists were invited to participate directly, shipping their work straight to Pittsburgh and bypassing the selection process, while some were invited to submit works to a selection committee, often at their own expense. Exceptions include 1902, when the exhibition was a historical overview of well-known works by international artists; 1906, when the show was suspended to accommodate the enlargement of the museum; and a five-year hiatus between 1915 and 1919 due to World War I.

After an interruption due to soaring costs and the construction of the Institute's new wing, the Sarah Scaife Gallery, the 1977 and 1979 exhibitions were rebranded as the International Series, wherein single artists—Pierre Alechinsky, Willem de Kooning, and Eduardo Chillida—were featured. In 1982, it reappeared under a triennial survey format as the Carnegie International, and has been mounted every three to five years since. After the Venice Biennale, the Carnegie International is the oldest international survey exhibition in the world.

== Chronology ==
=== 1896–1914 ===
The Carnegie Institute holds the "annual exhibition" for eighteen years, except in 1906, due to museum construction.

=== 1920–1950 ===
Between 1920 and 1950, the Carnegie Institute held nineteen international exhibitions, with a hiatus during the Second World War and rebuilding of Europe. The Institute's second director, Homer Saint-Gaudens, instituted a new streamlined system whereby foreign representatives scouted promising works for his annual trips to Europe. Juries of award still included artists, but museum directors also served. Saint-Gaudens instituted the display of works by country during these years and introduced the Popular Prize, voted upon by the public, in 1924; he retired after the 1950 show.

=== 1951–1969 ===
Between 1952 and 1969, Institute presented an international six times (1952, 1955, 1958, 1961, 1964, 1967). Gordon Bailey Washburn maintained his predecessor's use of foreign advisors, but dropped nationality as the organizing structure. He organized four Internationals, which were distinguished from larger competitors (the Venice Biennale and São Paulo Bienal) in press materials as the only international survey curated by a single person, "one man’s view of contemporary art" in a few hundred works. Concurrent with the 1958 International and in celebration of the Pittsburgh bicentennial, his assistant director, Leon Arkus, organized a retrospective exhibition including 95 paintings from previous editions. That year, Marcel Duchamp and Vincent Price sat on the jury of award.

The 1964 and 1967 Internationals were organized by the Museum's fourth director, Gustave Von Groschwitz, in consultation with seven national correspondents based in Europe, whom he referred to as "informal co-jurors". Von Groschwitz returned to a nationality-based display structure and did away with numbered prizes, opting for six equal awards and several purchase prizes.

=== 1970–1979 ===
The 1970, 1977, and 1979 Internationals were organized by fifth director, Leon Arkus. Arkus eliminated prizes for the 1970 show, and switched to a single-artist, retrospective format for the 1977 (Pierre Alechinsky) and 1979 (split between Eduardo Chillida and Willem de Kooning) shows, awarding a $50,000 prize each of those years.

=== 1980–1990 ===
There were three internationals in the 1980s. John R. Lane became director in 1980, but hired curator Gene Baro to organize the 1982 International. This format has remained in place through all of the successive editions, with a twist in 1985, when Lane co-curated the exhibition with John Caldwell. All the curators since 1980, with the exception of Baro, have relied on the advice and/or assistance of advisory committees which also served on award-granting juries. The committees were most directly involved in the 1985 and 1988 shows, when the advisors were considered part of the curatorial team. The International was organized by John Caldwell in 1988;

=== 1991–2010 ===
The International was curated by Lynn Cooke and Mark Francis in 1991, Richard Armstrong in 1995; Madeleine Grynsztejn in 1999; Laura Hoptman in 2004; and Douglas Fogle in 2008. Advisory committees in recent years have been composed of other curators, critics, and artists; committee members also participate in the jury of award, alongside the museum director and select trustees.

== See also ==
- Carnegie Prize List of first prize winners at the exhibition.
