= Mural on Indian Red Ground =

1950 painting by Jackson Pollock

- Artist: Jackson Pollock
- Year: 1950
- Type: oil painting
- Dimensions: 180 cm × 240 cm (72 in × 96 in)
- Location: Tehran Museum of Contemporary Art; Tehran

Mural on Indian Red Ground is a 1950 abstract expressionist drip painting by American artist Jackson Pollock, currently in the collection of the Tehran Museum of Contemporary Art. It is valued at about $250 million and is considered one of Pollock's greatest works.

== History ==
The collection of the Tehran Museum of Contemporary Art was bought during Iran's 1970s oil boom under the supervision of queen Farah Pahlavi. The museum was established in 1977 but the collection was displayed for only a short period. After the 1979 revolution, the paintings were stored in the basement of the museum and carefully looked after for about 30 years. In a 2005 exhibition Mural on Indian Red Ground and many other paintings were displayed for the first time after the revolution.

Today, Mural on Indian Red Ground is considered one of the Tehran Museum of Contemporary Art's prize pieces. The painting was loaned to Japan in 2011-12 and was displayed in an exhibition that originated at the Aichi Prefectural Museum in Nagoya, Japan, in 2011 and traveled to the National Museum of Modern Art, Tokyo celebrating the 100th anniversary of the birth of Jackson Pollock. In return to Iran on 11 May 2012, the painting was seized in the Tehran Imam Khomeini International Airport by Iran's customs service. The service said it confiscated the work over money owed by the Ministry of Culture, which ran the museum. After more than two weeks, the painting was finally released and returned to the museum. The painting was, around 2010, valued by Christie's at $250 million.
