= Jeffrey Potter =

American biographer

- Born: Jeffrey Brackett Potter; April 12, 1918; Manhattan, New York
- Died: December 15, 2012 (aged 94); Southampton, New York
- Education: Groton School
- Occupation: Biographer
- Spouse: Priscilla Bowden
- Children: Job Potter; Manon Potter; Gayle Basso; Horatio Potter
- Parent(s): Mary Barton Atterbury; Joseph Wiltsie Fuller Potter

Jeffrey Potter (April 12, 1918 – December 15, 2012) was an American biographer best known for his 1985 biography of Jackson Pollock, whom he had befriended in 1949. He also published two children’s books and two non-fiction works: one about environmental disaster, and an authorised biography of Dorothy Schiff.

Potter was born to Mary Barton Atterbury and Joseph Wiltsie Fuller Potter, on April 12, 1918, in Manhattan. His father was a Wall Street stockbroker. The young Jeffrey dropped out of Groton School to become a newspaper reporter, factory machinist and seaman. During World War II he joined the American Field Service, where he was attached to the British Indian Army, as an ambulance driver and medic in the Burma Campaign.

While working as a building contractor in the Hamptons in 1949, he befriended painter Jackson Pollock. Pollock and his wife, Lee Krasner, lived in Springs, near Potter's home in Amagansett, New York. They remained friends until Pollock's death in 1956.

Potter's first biography, Men, Money & Magic: The Story of Dorothy Schiff was published by Coward, McCann & Geoghegan in 1976. Much of the book is devoted to Schiff's relationships with her husbands and male friends, including President Franklin D. Roosevelt. The authorised work suggested the relationship with Roosevelt was sexual. The sensational story received extensive coverage in Time Magazine of June 7, 1976. Schiff denied it and came to refer to Potter's work as "that awful book", although, when she left her papers to the New York Public Library, after her death in 1989, pages initialed by her referred to the joint purchase with FDR of a house next to Hyde Park, New York. Potter felt betrayed by the denial.

In 1985, Potter published a book on Pollock, consisting of selections from hundreds of taped interviews with Pollock's family, friends, colleagues and neighbors. A production company representing Barbra Streisand and Robert De Niro bought the film rights; Pollock, a competing production, featuring Ed Harris as Pollock, eventually won the day.

Pollock (2000) was based on the Pulitzer Prize winning Jackson Pollock: An American Saga, by Steven Naifeh and Gregory White Smith. Potter claimed the book had plagiarised his, and Naifeh and Smith sued him for libel. Ed Harris would later say that his interest in portraying Pollock was inspired by Potter's book, which he had received as birthday gift from his father.

== Publications ==
- To a Violent Grave: An Oral Biography of Jackson Pollock (1985)
- Men, money & magic: the story of Dorothy Schiff (1976)
- Disaster by oil: oil spills: why they happen, what they do, how we can end them (1973)
- Elephant Bridge (1960)
- Robin Is a Bear: 2 (1958)
