= Mural (1943) =

1943 painting by Jackson Pollock

- Artist: Jackson Pollock
- Year: 1943
- Type: Oil and casein on canvas
- Dimensions: 243 cm × 604 cm (96 in × 238 in)
- Location: University of Iowa Museum of Art; Iowa City

Mural is a 1943 large painting by American artist Jackson Pollock. Although signed and dated 1943, the signature and date were not added until 1947, and the work was probably completed around the fall of 1943. It was made with oil paint (and an off-white water-based paint) on linen, and is Pollock's largest canvas, measuring 2.43 by 6.04 metres (8 ft 0 in × 19 ft 10 in). The work was commissioned by Peggy Guggenheim for the long entrance hall of her townhouse at 155 East 61st Street in New York City.

The work marks an important transitional moment in Pollock's artistic career, from his earlier works of surrealist abstraction towards action painting. It has been held by the University of Iowa Museum of Art since 1951.

== Background ==
In 1943, Pollock had recently come to the end of a period working for the Federal Art Project, and was working at the Museum of Non-Objective Painting (later the Solomon R. Guggenheim Museum). The talent displayed by his small early paintings was recognized by Howard Putzel, who introduced him to Guggenheim. She was an art collector and dealer, and Pollock signed a contract with her gallery in July 1943 under which he would be paid $150 per month as a retainer, to be set against any proceeds from the sale of his artworks.

Mural was Pollock's first commission. Guggenheim first considered asking for a mural to be painted on the wall, but Marcel Duchamp suggested that it should be painted on canvas so it could be moved. Guggenheim bought an oversize canvas of Belgian linen and gave it to Pollock, but otherwise gave him no direction or instructions, and Pollock was simply asked to paint whatever he wished. A wall had to be removed to allow the large canvas to be installed.

The mural was intended to be completed before a planned exhibition of his works opening in November 1943, but according to Lee Krasner, he continued to stare at a blank canvas, saying he was "blocked". Eventually, it was conventionally said, around 1 January 1944, he began frenetic work, completing the entire work in one day.

It appears that in reality the painting was finished earlier than that and was not done in one day.

Francis O'Connor's research found that Pollock sent a letter in January 1944 telling his brother, Frank, “I painted quite a large painting for Miss Guggenheim during the summer—8 feet x 20 feet. It was grand fun,”. Another letter from Peggy Guggenheim on 12 November 1943 to a friend, in which she describes: "We had a party for the new genius Jackson Pollock; who is having a show here now. He painted a 20 foot mural in my house in the entrance. Everyone likes it nearly except Kenneth [referring to another tenant]. Rather bad luck on him as he has to see it every time he goes in and out . . ."

Investigations applied during Mural’s recent stints in the Museum of Modern Art and Getty conservation labs validate O’Connor’s documentary research, further disproving the legend through technical means. The Getty conservators conclude definitively that “rapid work is not the case here, as there are many areas of dried oil paint evident under subsequent layers.” Scientific analyses of minute samples of paint, they explain, confirm this as well.

== Description ==
Mural is a largely abstract work with the suggestion of several human figures walking, or possibly birds, or letters and numbers, in broad swirls of black and white. It combines influences from artists such as Thomas Hart Benton, Albert Pinkham Ryder and El Greco, and Mexican mural artists such as David Alfaro Siqueiros.

== Painting technique ==
The painting was investigated by the scientists of the Getty Museum and the University of Iowa around 2012. Pollock employed cerulean blue, cadmium yellow, vermilion, and umber, with touches of phthalocyanine green and blue mixed in oil and a casein household paint. Most of the paint was applied with a brush, but some appears to have been splashed on.

== Reception ==
The importance of Mural was recognized immediately. The art critic Clement Greenberg wrote: "I took one look at it and I thought, 'Now that's great art,' and I knew Jackson was the greatest painter this country had produced."

After Guggenheim moved to Venice in 1947, she arranged with Lester Longman to donate the work to the University of Iowa. It was shipped to Iowa in 1951, where it is still held by the University of Iowa Museum of Art.

== Conservation ==
The condition of the work had deteriorated by the 1970s, with the canvas sagging due to a weak stretcher and paint starting to flake off. The University of Iowa relined the painting in 1973, adding a second canvas with a wax adhesive, and also replacing the stretcher and varnishing the surface to stabilise the paint.

The painting was sent to the J. Paul Getty Museum in Los Angeles for 18 months from 2012 to 2014 to be fully conserved. The varnish was removed, and the stretcher was replaced again, this time with a curved stretcher that respects the sagged shape of the canvas. This conservation work revealed several layers of dried oil paints, without the distinct colours being swirled together, suggest that the work was not in fact completed in one day as had previously been thought, but rather was completed over a period of weeks, and was left to dry for several days between each session. However, the use of a quicker-drying white water-based casein house paint to add finishing touches to the upper layer suggests the painting may have been completed in hurry. Almost all of the drips of the thickly-applied paint flow in one direction, indicating that the work was mostly painted in an upright position with a brush. However, thin strands of pink indicate that some paint was applied using Pollock's famous "drip" action painting technique, in which the medium is laid horizontally on the floor.

After the exhibition of Mural at the J. Paul Getty Museum, the painting was transported to the Sioux City Art Center in Iowa for a nine-month exhibition that concluded in April 2015. From there, the restored painting was exhibited at the Peggy Guggenheim Museum in Venice in 2015. Its value was estimated in 2016 at around $140 million. It was exhibited at the Columbia Museum of Art in 2019, and then at the Boston Museum of Fine Arts in 2019-2020.
