= Jackson Pollock =

American painter (1912–1956)

- Pollock in 1951
- Born: Paul Jackson Pollock; January 28, 1912; Cody, Wyoming, U.S.
- Died: August 11, 1956 (aged 44); Springs, New York, U.S.
- Education: Art Students League of New York
- Known for: Painting
- Notable work: Number 17A (1948); No. 5, 1948 (1948); Mural on Indian Red Ground (1950); Autumn Rhythm (1950); Convergence (1952); Blue Poles (Number 11, 1952) (1952); The Deep (1953)
- Movement: Abstract expressionism
- Spouse: Lee Krasner (m. 1945)

Paul Jackson Pollock (/ˈpɒlək/; January 28, 1912 – August 11, 1956) was an American painter. A major figure in the abstract expressionist movement, he was noted for his "drip technique" of pouring or splashing liquid household paint onto a horizontal surface, enabling him to view and paint his canvases from all angles. It was called all-over painting and action painting, because Pollock covered the entire canvas and used the force of his whole body to paint, often in a frenetic dancing style. This extreme form of abstraction divided critics: some praised the immediacy of the creation, while others derided the random effects.

A reclusive and volatile personality, Pollock struggled with alcoholism for most of his life. In 1945, he married artist Lee Krasner, who became an important influence on his career and on his legacy. Pollock died in August 1956 at age 44 in an alcohol-related single-car collision when he was driving. Four months after his death, Pollock was given a memorial retrospective exhibition at the Museum of Modern Art (MoMA) in New York City. A larger, more comprehensive exhibition of his work was held there in 1967. In 1998 and 1999, Pollock's work was honored with large-scale retrospective exhibitions at MoMA and the Tate Gallery in London.

== Early life (1912–1936) ==
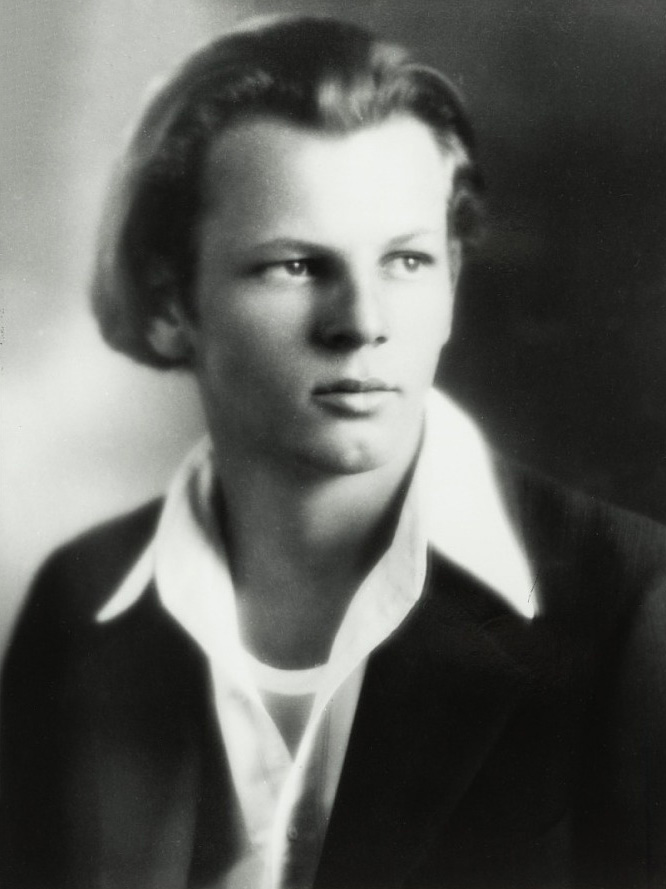
Pollock in 1928

Paul Jackson Pollock was born in Cody, Wyoming, on January 28, 1912, the youngest of five brothers. His parents, Stella May (née McClure) and LeRoy Pollock, were born and grew up in Tingley, Iowa, and were educated at Tingley High School. Stella is interred at Tingley Cemetery, Ringgold County, Iowa. His father had been born with the surname McCoy, but he took the surname of his adoptive parents. Stella and LeRoy Pollock were Presbyterian and were of Irish and Scots-Irish descent, respectively. LeRoy was a farmer and later a land surveyor for the government, moving for different jobs. Stella, proud of her family's heritage as weavers, made and sold dresses as a teenager. In November 1912, Stella took her sons to San Diego; Pollock was just 10 months old and would never return to Cody. He subsequently grew up in Arizona and Chico, California.

While living in the Vermont Square neighborhood of Los Angeles, Pollock enrolled at Manual Arts High School, from which he was expelled. Pollock had already been expelled in 1928 from another high school. During his early life, Pollock explored Native American culture while on surveying trips with his father. Pollock was also heavily influenced by Mexican muralists, particularly José Clemente Orozco, whose fresco Prometheus he would later call "the greatest painting in North America".

In 1930, following his oldest brother Charles, Pollock moved to New York City, where they both studied under Thomas Hart Benton at the Art Students League. Benton's rural American subject matter had little influence on Pollock's work, but his rhythmic use of paint and his fierce independence were more lasting. In the early 1930s, Pollock spent a summer touring the Western United States together with Glen Rounds, a fellow art student, and Benton, their teacher.

== Career (1936–1954) ==
Pollock was introduced to the use of liquid paint in 1936 at an experimental workshop in New York City by the Mexican muralist David Alfaro Siqueiros. That summer, Pollock went to Dartmouth College to study José Clemente Orozco's 3,200 square foot mural, The Epic of American Civilization. He later used paint pouring as one of several techniques on canvases of the early 1940s, such as Male and Female and Composition with Pouring I. After moving to Springs, New York, Pollock began painting with his canvases laid out on the studio floor, and he developed what was later called his "drip" technique.

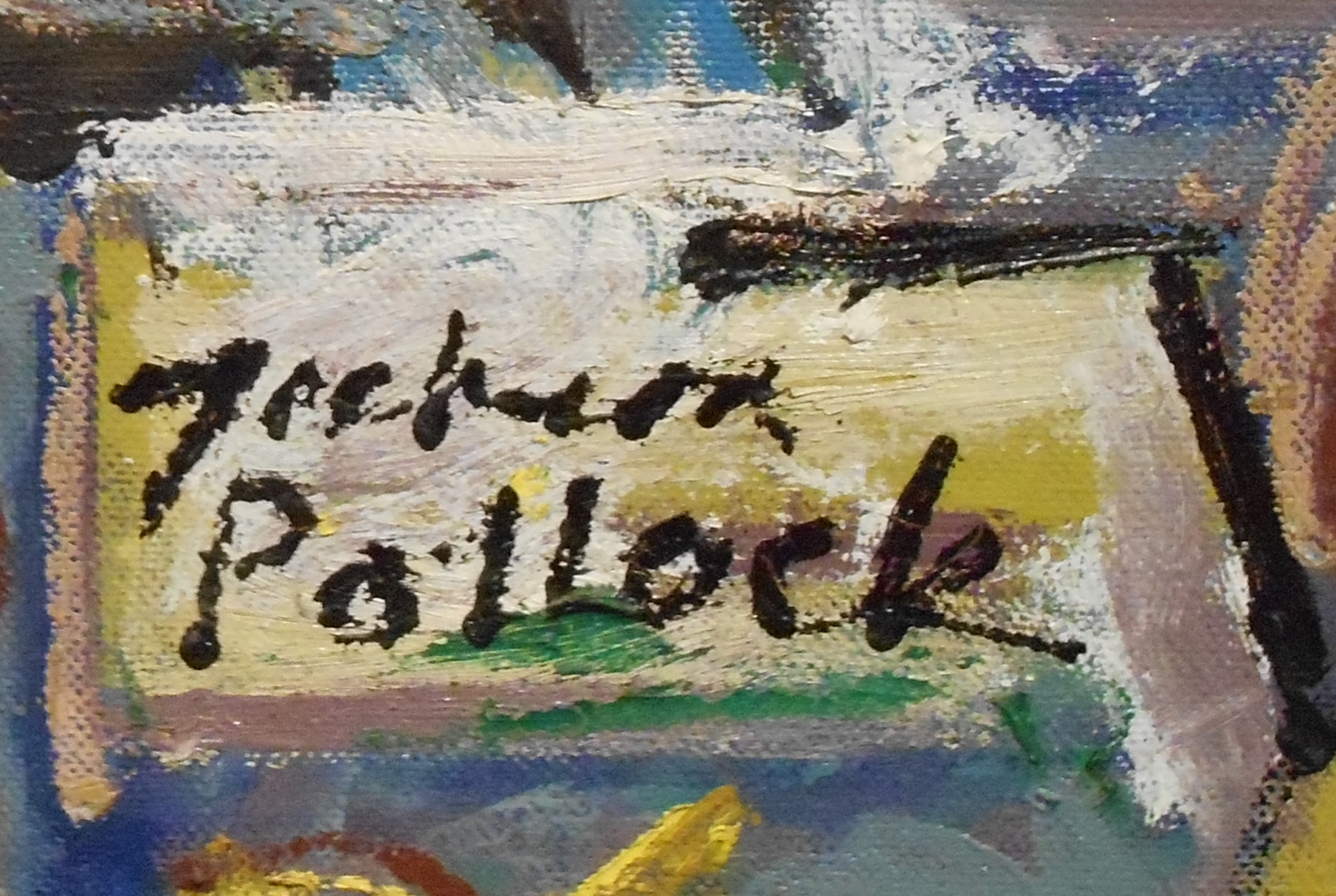
Signature of Jackson Pollock on Pasiphaë (1943; Metropolitan Museum of Art)

From 1938 to 1942, Pollock worked for the WPA Federal Art Project. During this time, he was trying to deal with his established alcoholism; from 1938 through 1941, Pollock underwent Jungian psychotherapy with Dr. Joseph L. Henderson and later with Dr. Violet Staub de Laszlo from 1941 to 1942. Henderson engaged him through his art, encouraging Pollock to make drawings. Jungian concepts and archetypes were expressed in his paintings. Some psychiatrists have hypothesized that Pollock might have had bipolar disorder.

Pollock signed a gallery contract with Peggy Guggenheim in July 1943. He received the commission to create the 8-by-20-foot (2.4 by 6.1 m) Mural (1943) for the entry to her new townhouse. At the suggestion of her friend and advisor Marcel Duchamp, Pollock painted the work on canvas, rather than the wall, so that it would be portable. After seeing the big mural, the art critic Clement Greenberg wrote: "I took one look at it and I thought, 'Now that's great art,' and I knew Jackson was the greatest painter this country had produced." The catalog introducing his first exhibition described Pollock's talent as "volcanic. It has fire. It is unpredictable. It is undisciplined. It spills out of itself in a mineral prodigality, not yet crystallized."

=== Drip period ===
Pollock's most famous paintings were made during the "drip period" between 1947 and 1950. However, when investigating the impact that other artists have had on him and his "drip paintings", the time that Pollock spent working and studying in the Experimental Workshop with David Alfaro Siqueiros in 1936 is rarely investigated or acknowledged. According to Robert Storr, "there is no other experience in his professional life that is equal to the decade that he spent learning from and observing the modern Mexican muralists…," especially when comparing this period of informal training to his formal education with Thomas Hart Benton, which, although critical to his beginnings, was short lived. Additionally, when specifically asked about how the "drip" came to be, Pollock disavowed his association with Siqueiros on multiple occasions and made contradictory statements. For example, in 1947, Pollock suggests that he painted his canvases on the floor because he witnessed the Navajo sand artist at the Natural History Museum in New York do it in 1941 (five years after he witnessed Siqueiros do it in 1936), and soon after, Pollock suggested that he painted his canvases on the floor because "the Orientals did it".

Eventually, Pollock became famous for his "drip" paintings and was the subject of an article in the 8 August 1949 issue of LIFE titled "Jackson Pollock: Is he the greatest living painter in the United States?" Thanks to the mediation of Alfonso Ossorio, a close friend of Pollock, and the art historian Michel Tapié, the young gallery owner Paul Facchetti, from March 7, 1952, managed to realize the first exhibition of Pollock's works from 1948 to 1951 in his Studio Paul Facchetti in Paris and in Europe. At the peak of his fame, Pollock abruptly abandoned the drip style. Pollock's drip paintings were influenced by the artist Janet Sobel; the art critic Clement Greenberg would later report that Pollock "admitted" to him that Sobel's work "had made an impression on him."

Pollock's work after 1951 was darker in color, including a collection painted in black on unprimed canvases. These paintings have been referred to as his "Black pourings" and when he exhibited them at the Betty Parsons Gallery in New York, none of them sold. Parsons later sold one to a friend at half the price. These works show Pollock attempting to find a balance between abstraction and depictions of the figure.

Pollock later returned to using color and continued with figurative elements. During this period, he had moved to the Sidney Janis Gallery, a more commercial gallery; the demand for Pollock's work from collectors was great. In response to this pressure, along with personal frustration, his alcoholism deepened.

=== Relationship with Lee Krasner ===
Pollock and Lee Krasner met while they both exhibited at the McMillen Gallery in 1942. Krasner was unfamiliar yet intrigued with Pollock's work and went to his apartment, unannounced, to meet him following the gallery exhibition. In October 1945, Pollock and Krasner were married in a church with two witnesses present for the event. The following month, they moved out of the city to the Springs area of East Hampton on the south shore of Long Island. With the help of a down-payment loan from Peggy Guggenheim, they bought a wood-frame house and barn at 830 Springs Fireplace Road. Pollock converted the barn into a studio. In that space, he perfected his "drip" technique of working with paint, with which Pollock would become permanently identified. When the couple found themselves free from work, they enjoyed spending their time together cooking and baking, working on the house and garden, and entertaining friends.

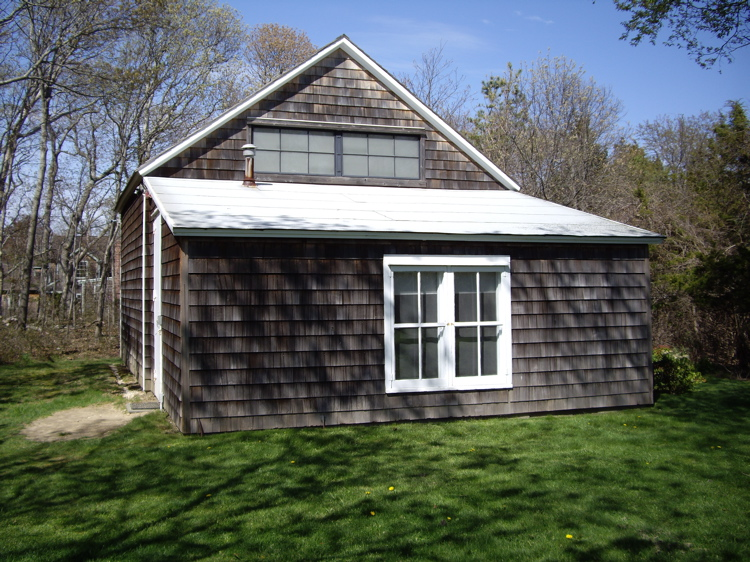
Pollock's studio in Springs, New York

Krasner's influence on her husband's art was something critics began to reassess by the latter half of the 1960s due to the rise of feminism at the time. Her extensive knowledge and training in modern art and techniques helped her bring Pollock up to date with what contemporary art should be. Krasner is often considered to have tutored her husband in the tenets of modernistic painting. Pollock was then able to change his style to fit a more organized and cosmopolitan genre of modern art, and Krasner became the one judge he could trust. At the beginning of the two artists' marriage, Pollock would trust his peers' opinions on what worked or did not work in his pieces. Krasner was also responsible for introducing Pollock to many collectors, critics, and artists, including Herbert Matter, who would help further his career as an emerging artist. Art dealer John Bernard Myers once said "there would never have been a Jackson Pollock without a Lee Pollock", whereas fellow painter Fritz Bultman referred to Pollock as Krasner's "creation, her Frankenstein", both men recognizing the immense influence Krasner had on Pollock's career.

Pollock's influence on his wife's artwork is often discussed by art historians. Many people thought Krasner began to reproduce and reinterpret her husband's chaotic paint splatters in her own work. There are several accounts where Krasner intended to use her own intuition as a way to move towards Pollock's I am nature technique in order to reproduce nature in her art.

On October 4, 2026, the Metropolitan Museum of Art opened Krasner and Pollock: Past Continuous. The exhibition examines their relationship and their role in the Abstract Expressionism movement. Krasner and Pollock: Past Continuous is the first major New York presentation devoted to either artist in more than 20 years. Featuring over 120 works, it is the first exhibition to look at the full arc of their careers together. It is scheduled to run through January 31, 2027.

== Later years and death (1955–1956) ==
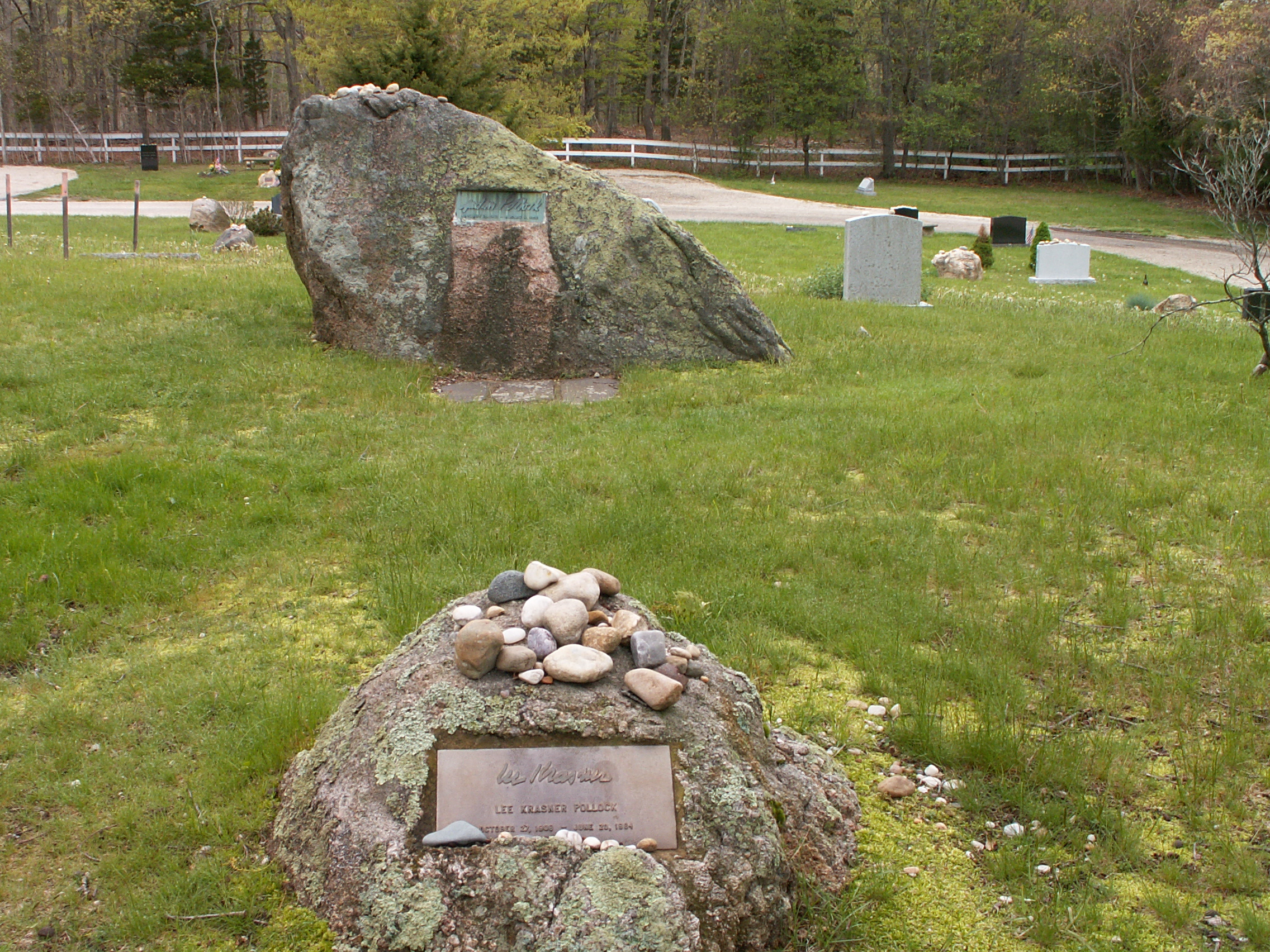
Jackson Pollock's grave in the rear with Lee Krasner's grave in front in the Green River Cemetery

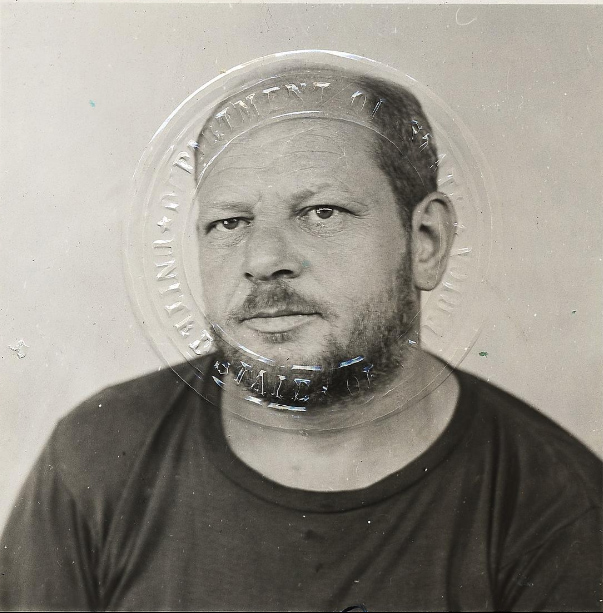
Pollock's passport photograph (1955)

In 1955, Pollock painted Scent and Search, his last two paintings. He did not paint at all in 1956, but was making sculptures at Tony Smith's home: constructions of wire, gauze, and plaster. Shaped by sand-casting, they have heavily textured surfaces similar to what Pollock often created in his paintings.

Pollock and Krasner's relationship began to crumble by 1956, owing to Pollock's continuing alcoholism and infidelity involving another artist, Ruth Kligman. On August 11, 1956, at 10:15 p.m., Pollock died in a single-car crash in his Oldsmobile convertible while driving under the influence of alcohol. At the time, Krasner was visiting friends in Europe; she abruptly returned on hearing the news from a friend. One of the passengers, Edith Metzger, was also killed in the accident, which occurred less than a mile from Pollock's home. The other passenger, Ruth Kligman, survived. In December 1956, four months after his death, Pollock was given a memorial retrospective exhibition at the Museum of Modern Art (MoMA) in New York City. A larger, more comprehensive exhibition of his work was held there in 1967. In 1998 and 1999, his work was honored with large-scale retrospective exhibitions at MoMA and at The Tate in London.

For the rest of her life, Pollock's widow, Lee Krasner, managed his estate and ensured that Pollock's reputation remained strong despite changing art world trends. They are buried in Green River Cemetery in Springs with a large boulder marking his grave and a smaller one marking hers.

== Artistry ==
=== Influence and technique ===
The work of Thomas Hart Benton, Pablo Picasso and Joan Miró influenced Pollock. Pollock started using synthetic resin-based paints called alkyd enamels, which at that time was a novel medium. He described this use of household paints, instead of artist's paints, as "a natural growth out of a need". Pollock used hardened brushes, sticks, and even basting syringes as paint applicators. His technique of pouring and dripping paint is thought to be one of the origins of the term action painting. With this technique, Pollock was able to achieve his own signature style palimpsest paintings, with paints flowing from his chosen tool onto the canvas. By defying the convention of painting on an upright surface, Pollock added a new dimension by being able to view and apply paint to his canvases from all directions.

In 1936, Pollock participated in an experimental workshop run by the Mexican muralist David Alfaro Siqueiros. It was there that he first used liquid enamel paints, which he continued to incorporate in his paintings in the early to mid 1940s, long before encountering the work of the Ukrainian American artist Janet Sobel (born Jennie Lechovsky; 1894–1968). Peggy Guggenheim included Sobel's work in her The Art of This Century Gallery in 1945. Pollock and art critic Clement Greenberg saw Sobel's work there in 1946, and Greenberg later noted that Sobel was "a direct influence on Jackson Pollock's drip painting technique". In his essay "American-Type Painting", Greenberg noted those works were the first of all-over painting he had seen, and said, "Pollock admitted that these pictures had made an impression on him".

While painting this way, Pollock moved away from figurative representation, and challenged the Western tradition of using easel and brush. He used the force of his whole body to paint, which was expressed on the large canvases. In 1956, Time magazine dubbed Pollock "Jack the Dripper" due to his painting style.

My painting does not come from the easel. I prefer to tack the unstretched canvas to the hard wall or the floor. I need the resistance of a hard surface. On the floor I am more at ease. I feel nearer, more part of the painting, since this way I can walk around it, work from the four sides and literally be in the painting.

I continue to get further away from the usual painter's tools such as easel, palette, brushes, etc. I prefer sticks, trowels, knives and dripping fluid paint or a heavy impasto with sand, broken glass or other foreign matter added.

When I am in my painting, I'm not aware of what I'm doing. It is only after a sort of "get acquainted" period that I see what I have been about. I have no fear of making changes, destroying the image, etc., because the painting has a life of its own. I try to let it come through. It is only when I lose contact with the painting that the result is a mess. Otherwise there is pure harmony, an easy give and take, and the painting comes out well.

— Jackson Pollock, My Painting, 1947

Pollock observed Native American sandpainting demonstrations in the 1940s. Referring to his style of painting on the floor, Pollock stated, "I feel nearer, more a part of the painting, since this way I can walk round it, work from the four sides and literally be in the painting. This is akin to the methods of the Indian sand painters of the West." Other influences on his drip technique include the Mexican muralists and Surrealist automatism. Pollock denied reliance on "the accident"; he usually had an idea of how he wanted a particular work to appear. Pollock's technique combined the movement of his body, over which he had control, the viscous flow of paint, the force of gravity, and the absorption of paint into the canvas. It was a mixture of controllable and uncontrollable factors. Flinging, dripping, pouring, and spattering, Pollock would move energetically around the canvas, almost as if in a dance, and would not stop until he saw what he wanted to see.

Austrian artist Wolfgang Paalen's article on totem art of the indigenous people of British Columbia, in which the concept of space in totemist art is considered from an artist's point of view, influenced Pollock as well; Pollock owned a signed and dedicated copy of the Amerindian Number of Paalen's magazine (DYN 4–5, 1943). He had also seen Paalen's surrealist paintings in an exhibition in 1940. Another strong influence must have been Paalen's surrealist fumage technique, which appealed to painters looking for new ways to depict what was called the "unseen" or the "possible". The technique was once demonstrated in Matta's workshop, about which Steven Naifeh and Gregory White Smith report, "Once, when Matta was demonstrating the Surrealist technique [Paalen's] Fumage, Jackson [Pollock] turned to (Peter) Busa and said in a stage whisper: 'I can do that without the smoke.'" Pollock's painter friend Fritz Bultman even stated, "It was Wolfgang Paalen who started it all."

In 1950, Hans Namuth, a young photographer, wanted to take pictures—both stills and moving—of Pollock at work. Pollock promised to start a new painting especially for the photographic session, but when Namuth arrived, Pollock apologized and told him the painting was finished.

Photographer Hans Namuth extensively documented Pollock's unique painting techniques.

Namuth said that when he entered the studio:

A dripping wet canvas covered the entire floor ... There was complete silence ... Pollock looked at the painting. Then, unexpectedly, he picked up can and paint brush and started to move around the canvas. It was as if he suddenly realized the painting was not finished. His movements, slow at first, gradually became faster and more dance like as he flung black, white, and rust colored paint onto the canvas. He completely forgot that Lee and I were there; he did not seem to hear the click of the camera shutter ... My photography session lasted as long as he kept painting, perhaps half an hour. In all that time, Pollock did not stop. How could one keep up this level of activity? Finally, he said "This is it."

Pollock's finest paintings ... reveal that his all-over line does not give rise to positive or negative areas: we are not made to feel that one part of the canvas demands to be read as figure, whether abstract or representational, against another part of the canvas read as ground. There is not inside or outside to Pollock's line or the space through which it moves. ... Pollock has managed to free line not only from its function of representing objects in the world, but also from its task of describing or bounding shapes or figures, whether abstract or representational, on the surface of the canvas.

— Karmel, 132

=== From naming to numbering ===
Continuing to evade the viewer's search for figurative elements in his paintings, Pollock abandoned titles and started numbering his works. Pollock said about this, "Look passively and try to receive what the painting has to offer and not bring a subject matter or preconceived idea of what they are to be looking for." Lee Krasner said, "He used to give his pictures conventional titles ... but now he simply numbers them. Numbers are neutral. They make people look at a picture for what it is—pure painting."

=== Critical debate ===
Pollock's work has been the subject of important critical debates. Critic Robert Coates once derided a number of Pollock's works as "mere unorganized explosions of random energy, and therefore meaningless". Reynold's News, in a 1959 headline, said, "This is not art—it's a joke in bad taste." French abstract painter Jean Hélion, on the other hand, remarked on first seeing a Pollock, "It filled out space going on and on because it did not have a start or end to it." Clement Greenberg supported Pollock's work on formalistic grounds. It fit well with Greenberg's view of art history as a progressive purification in form and elimination of historical content. He considered Pollock's work to be the best painting of its day and the culmination of the Western tradition via Cubism and Cézanne to Manet.

In a 1952 article in ARTnews, Harold Rosenberg coined the term "action painting" and wrote that "what was to go on the canvas was not a picture but an event. The big moment came when it was decided to paint 'just to paint'. The gesture on the canvas was a gesture of liberation from value—political, aesthetic, moral." Many people assumed that he had modeled his "action painter" paradigm on Pollock.

The Congress for Cultural Freedom, an organization to promote American culture and values, backed by the Central Intelligence Agency (CIA), sponsored exhibitions of Pollock's work. Some left-wing scholars, including Eva Cockcroft, have argued that the United States government and wealthy elite embraced Pollock and abstract expressionism to place the United States in the forefront of global art and devalue socialist realism. Cockcroft wrote that Pollock became a "weapon of the Cold War".

Pollock described his art as "motion made visible memories, arrested in space".

== Legacy ==
=== Influence ===
Pollock's staining into raw canvas was adapted by the Color Field painters Helen Frankenthaler and Morris Louis. Frank Stella made "all-over composition" a hallmark of his works of the 1960s. Joseph Glasco was introduced to Pollock by Alfonso Ossorio in 1949. Throughout his life, Glasco continued to reflect on Pollock's artistic influence, particularly in the early to mid-1970s when his style changed to all-over collage paintings with their emphasis on rhythm and process. The Happenings artist Allan Kaprow, sculptors Richard Serra and Eva Hesse, and many contemporary artists have retained Pollock's emphasis on the process of creation; they were influenced by his approach to the process, rather than the look of his work.

In 2004, One: Number 31, 1950 was ranked the eighth-most influential piece of modern art in a poll of 500 artists, curators, critics, and dealers.

=== In pop culture and media ===
In the early 1990s, three groups of movie makers were developing Pollock biographical projects, each based on a different source. The project that at first seemed most advanced was a joint venture between Barbra Streisand's Barwood Films and Robert De Niro's TriBeCa Productions (De Niro's parents were friends of Krasner and Pollock). The script, by Christopher Cleveland, was to be based on Jeffrey Potter's 1985 oral biography, To a Violent Grave, a collection of reminiscences by Pollock's friends. Streisand was to play the role of Lee Krasner, and De Niro was to portray Pollock. A second was to be based on Love Affair (1974), a memoir by Ruth Kligman, who was Pollock's lover in the six months before his death. This was to be directed by Harold Becker, with Al Pacino playing Pollock.

In 2000, the biographical film Pollock, based on the Pulitzer Prize-winning biography, Jackson Pollock: An American Saga, directed by and starring Ed Harris, was released. Marcia Gay Harden won the Academy Award for Best Supporting Actress for her portrayal of Lee Krasner. The movie was the project of Harris, who was nominated for the Academy Award for Best Actor. Harris himself painted the works seen in the film. The Pollock-Krasner Foundation did not authorize or collaborate with any production.

In September 2009, the art historian Henry Adams claimed in Smithsonian magazine that Pollock had written his name in his famous painting Mural (1943). The painting is now insured for US$140 million. In 2011, the Republican Iowa State Representative Scott Raecker introduced a bill to force the sale of the artwork, held by the University of Iowa, to fund scholarships, but his bill created such controversy that it was quickly withdrawn.

Pollock's painting Free Form is shown throughout the 2016 movie The Accountant. The movie's main character, played by Ben Affleck, gains the painting through his career. He gifts it to the character played by Anna Kendrick at the end of the film.

One of Jackson Pollock's works is featured heavily in the film Ex Machina (2014). A pivotal scene in the film contains a monologue where antagonist Nathan Bateman describes the central challenge of artificial intelligence as engineering a cognitive state that is "not deliberate, not random, but somewhere in between," which he likens to the cognitive state Pollock achieves while painting.

=== Art market ===
In 1973, Number 11, 1952 (also known as Blue Poles) was purchased by the Australian Gough Whitlam government for the National Gallery of Australia for US$2 million (A$1.3 million at the time of payment). This was the highest price ever paid for a modern painting and the painting is now one of the most popular exhibits. The artwork contains only a fleeting reference to the real world and Blue Poles has become the flagship of autonomous art. Blue Poles was a centerpiece of the Museum of Modern Art's 1998 retrospective in New York, the first time the painting had been shown in America since its purchase.

In November 2006, Pollock's No. 5, 1948 became the world's most expensive painting, when it was sold privately to an undisclosed buyer for the sum of US$140 million. Another artist record was established in 2004, when No. 12 (1949), a medium-sized drip painting that had been shown in the United States Pavilion at the 1950 Venice Biennale, fetched US$11.7 million at Christie's, New York. In 2012, Number 28, 1951, one of the artist's combinations of drip and brushwork in shades of silvery gray with red, yellow, and shots of blue and white, also sold at Christie's, New York, for US$20.5 million—US$23 million with fees—within its estimated range of US$20 million to US$30 million.

In 2013, Pollock's Number 19 (1948) was sold by Christie's for a reported US$58,363,750 during an auction that ultimately reached US$495 million total sales in one night, which Christie's reports as a record to date as the most expensive auction of contemporary art.

In February 2016, Bloomberg News reported that Kenneth C. Griffin had purchased Pollock's 1948 painting Number 17A for US$200 million, from David Geffen.

In 2023, an unknown Pollock painting was reportedly discovered in Bulgaria after international police agencies were able to track down a group of international art smugglers. The painting is reportedly worth up to 50 million euros.

In 2024, Kasmin announced exclusive global representation of Pollock. Kasmin has been representing Lee Krasner since 2016.

On May 18, 2026, Pollock's 1948 drip painting Number 7A was sold at Christie's in New York for $181.2 million, with fees, a new auction record for the artist.

== Authenticity issues ==
The Pollock-Krasner Authentication Board was created by the Pollock-Krasner Foundation in 1990 to evaluate newly found works for an upcoming supplement to the 1978 catalogue. However, the Pollock-Krasner Foundation has declined to be involved in recent authentication cases.

In 2003, 24 Pollockesque paintings and drawings were found in a locker in Wainscott, New York. In 2005, the Pollock-Krasner Foundation requested a computer analysis (see fractal analysis section below) to be used for the first time in an authenticity dispute. Researchers at the University of Oregon used the technique to identify differences between the patterns in the six disputed paintings analyzed and those in 14 established Pollocks.

In 2007, a traveling museum exhibition of the paintings was mounted and was accompanied by a comprehensive book, Pollock Matters, written by Ellen G. Landau, one of the four sitting scholars from the former Pollock Krasner Foundation authentication panel from the 1990s, and Claude Cernuschi, a scholar in Abstract Expressionism. In the book, Landau demonstrated the many connections between the family who owns the paintings and Jackson Pollock during his lifetime to place the paintings in what she believes to be their proper historic context. Pigment analysis of the paintings by researchers at Harvard University showed the presence in one painting of a synthetic pigment that was not patented until the 1980s, and materials in two others that were not available in Pollock's lifetime. Landau discussed the forensic findings of Harvard University and presented possible explanations for the forensic inconsistencies that were found in three of the 24 paintings. However, the scientist who invented one of the modern pigments dismissed the possibility that Pollock used this paint as being "unlikely to the point of fantasy".

In 2006, a documentary, Who the #$&% Is Jackson Pollock?, was made concerning Teri Horton, a truck driver who bought an abstract painting for five dollars at a thrift store in California in 1992. This work may be a lost Pollock painting, but its authenticity is debated. Thomas Hoving is shown in the documentary and states that the painting is on a primed canvas, which Pollock never used.

Untitled 1950, which the New York–based Knoedler Gallery had sold in 2007 for $17 million to Pierre Lagrange, a London hedge-fund multimillionaire, was subject to an authenticity suit before the United States District Court for the Southern District of New York. Done in the painter's classic drip-and-splash style and signed "J. Pollock", the modest-sized painting (15 by 28 1/2 inches (38 cm × 72 cm)) was found to contain yellow paint pigments not commercially available until about 1970. The suit was settled in a confidential agreement in 2012.

=== Fractal computer analysis ===
In 1999, the physicist and artist Richard Taylor used computer analysis to show similarities between Pollock's painted patterns and fractals (patterns that recur on multiple size scales) found in natural scenery, reflecting Pollock's own words: "I am nature". His research team labelled Pollock's style fractal expressionism.

In 2005, the Pollock-Krasner Foundation requested a fractal analysis to be used in the authenticity dispute over the Pollockesque paintings found in the locker in Wainscott, New York in 2003 (see above). Fractal analysis has also been employed by the International Foundation for Art Research. Applied to imitation Pollocks sold by the Knoedler Gallery, the analysis identified significant visual differences when compared to established Pollocks.

Subsequently, over 10 scientific groups have performed fractal analysis on over 50 of Pollock's works. A 2015 study that used fractal analysis as one of its techniques achieved a 93% success rate distinguishing real from fake Pollocks. A 2024 study used an artificial intelligence technique based on fractals to achieve a 99% success rate. Current research of Fractal Expressionism focuses on human response to viewing fractals. Cognitive neuroscientists have shown that Pollock's fractals induce the same stress-reduction in observers as computer-generated fractals and naturally occurring fractals.

== Archives ==
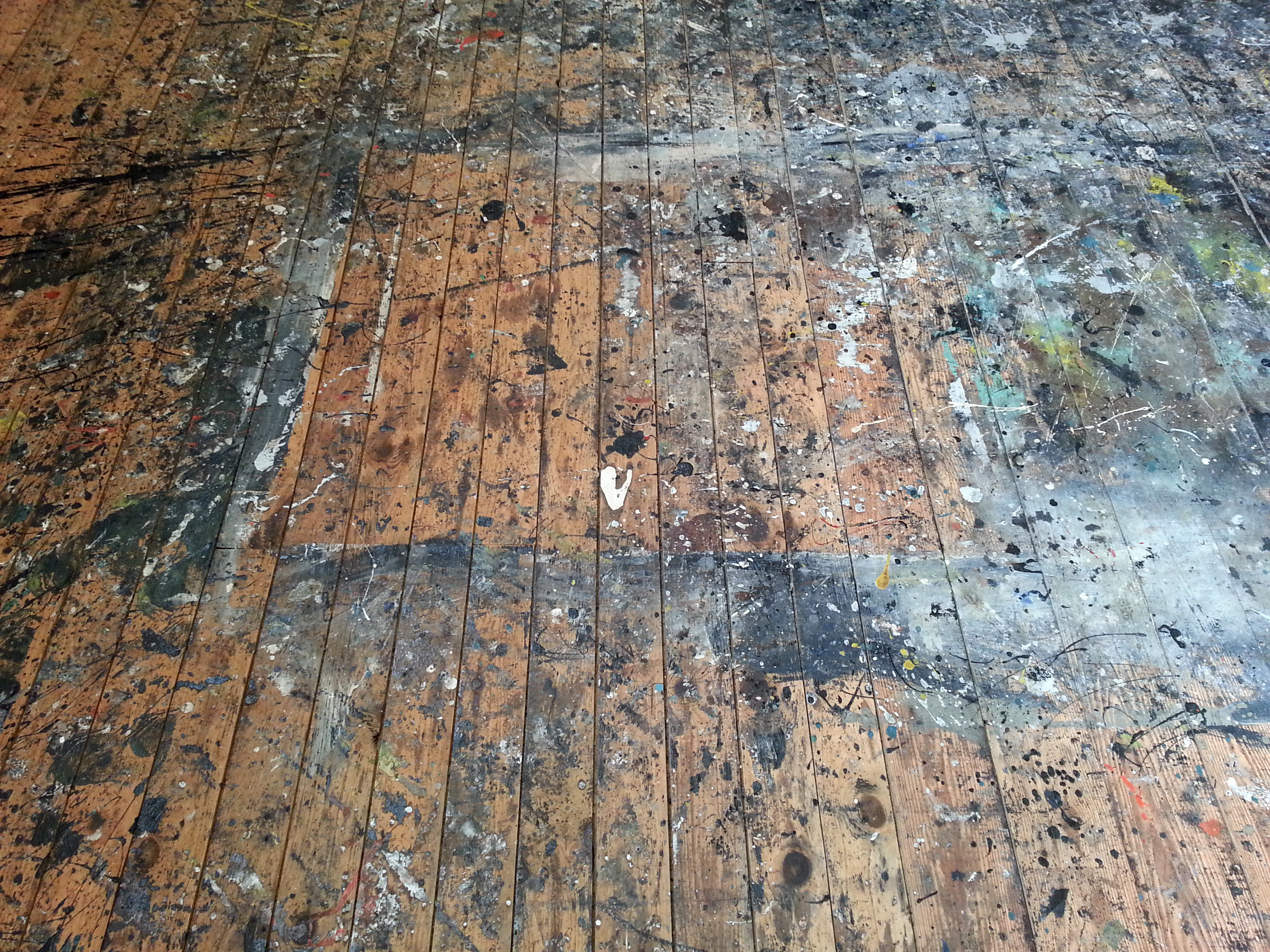
Pollock's studio-floor in Springs, New York, the visual result of being his primary painting surface from 1946 until 1953

Lee Krasner donated Pollock's papers to the Archives of American Art in 1983. They were later archived with her own papers. The Archives of American Art also houses the Charles Pollock papers, which include correspondence, photographs, and other files relating to his brother Jackson.

A separate organization, the Pollock-Krasner Foundation, was established in 1985. The foundation functions as the official estate for both Pollock and his widow, but also under the terms of Krasner's will, serves "to assist individual working artists of merit with financial need". The U.S. copyright representative for the Pollock-Krasner Foundation is the Artists Rights Society.

The Pollock-Krasner House and Studio is owned and administered by the Stony Brook Foundation, a nonprofit affiliate of Stony Brook University. Regular tours of the house and studio occur from May through October.

== List of major works ==
- 1942: Male and Female Philadelphia Museum of Art
- 1942: Stenographic Figure Museum of Modern Art
- 1942: The Moon Woman Peggy Guggenheim Collection
- 1943: Mural University of Iowa Museum of Art, given by Peggy Guggenheim
- 1943: The She-Wolf Museum of Modern Art
- 1943: Pasiphaë Metropolitan Museum of Art
- 1943: Guardians of the Secret San Francisco Museum of Modern Art
- 1943: Blue (Moby Dick) Ohara Museum of Art
- 1945: Night Mist Norton Museum of Art
- 1945: Troubled Queen Museum of Fine Arts, Boston
- 1946: Eyes in the Heat Peggy Guggenheim Collection, Venice
- 1946: The Key Art Institute of Chicago
- 1946: The Tea Cup Collection Frieder Burda
- 1946: Shimmering Substance, from The Sounds In The Grass Museum of Modern Art
- 1946: Free Form , MoMA
- 1947: Portrait of H.M. University of Iowa Museum of Art, given by Peggy Guggenheim.
- 1947: Full Fathom Five Museum of Modern Art
- 1947: Cathedral Dallas Museum of Art
- 1947: Enchanted Forest Peggy Guggenheim Collection
- 1947: Lucifer The Anderson Collection at Stanford University
- 1947: Sea Change Seattle Art Museum, given by Peggy Guggenheim
- 1948: Painting
- 1948: Number 5 (8 by 4 feet (2.4 m × 1.2 m)) Private collection
- 1948: Number 8 Neuburger Museum at the State University of New York at Purchase
- 1948: Number 13A: Arabesque Yale University Art Gallery, New Haven, Connecticut
- 1948: Composition (White, Black, Blue and Red on White) New Orleans Museum of Art
- 1948: Summertime: Number 9A Tate Modern
- 1948: Number 19
- 1949: Number 1 Glenstone Museum
- 1949: Number 2 Munson
- 1949: Number 3 Hirshhorn Museum and Sculpture Garden, Washington, D.C.
- 1949: Number 10 Museum of Fine Arts, Boston
- 1949: Number 11 Indiana University Art Museum Bloomington, Indiana
- 1950: Number 1, 1950 (Lavender Mist) National Gallery of Art
- 1950: Mural on Indian red ground, 1950 Tehran Museum of Contemporary Art
- 1950: Autumn Rhythm (Number 30), 1950 Metropolitan Museum of Art
- 1950: Number 29, 1950 National Gallery of Canada
- 1950: Number 32, 1950 Kunstsammlung Nordrhein-Westfalen, Düsseldorf, BRD
- 1950: One: Number 31, 1950 Museum of Modern Art
- 1951: Number 7 National Gallery of Art
- 1951: Black and White (Number 6) San Francisco Museum of Modern Art
- 1952: Convergence Albright-Knox Art Gallery
- 1952: Blue Poles: No. 11, 1952 National Gallery of Australia
- 1952: Number 12, 1952 Governor Nelson A. Rockefeller Empire State Plaza Art Collection
- 1953: Portrait and a Dream Dallas Museum of Art
- 1953: Easter and the Totem The Museum of Modern Art
- 1953: Ocean Greyness Solomon R. Guggenheim Museum
- 1953: The Deep Centre Georges Pompidou
