= Convergence (Pollock) =

Painting by Jackson Pollock

- Artist: Jackson Pollock
- Year: 1952
- Type: Abstract expressionism
- Medium: Oil on canvas
- Dimensions: 237 cm × 390 cm (93.5 in × 155 in)
- Location: Buffalo AKG Art Museum, Buffalo

Convergence is an oil painting by Jackson Pollock, from 1952. It is held at the Buffalo AKG Art Museum, in Buffalo.

== Composition ==
The composition was created on canvas, measuring 93.5 inches by 155 inches. It is an oil painting in a wide range of colors, lines and shapes, made by the method of dripping and pouring paint onto a canvas.

== Analysis and reception ==
These lines, spots, circles splattered on a canvas unintentionally convey the artist's emotions. The painting was made during the Cold War with Soviet Union, and it is considered that the painting represents the idea of freedom of speech.

Other scholars, including Yve-Alain Bois, have posited that this type of individualistic interpretation fails to account for how Pollock allowed the forces of gravity and fluidity to direct the pooling and mixing of the paint.

== Cultural references ==
Springbok Editions made the jigsaw puzzle called Convergence in 1964 based on the Pollock's painting. The puzzle consisted of 340 pieces and it was claimed as the most difficult puzzle in the world. The puzzle gained popularity in 1965 when hundreds of thousands of Americans acquired it.

== See also ==
- No. 5, 1948 – Jackson Pollock
