= Hans Namuth =

American photographer (1915–1990)

- Born: March 17, 1915; Essen, German Empire
- Died: October 13, 1990 (aged 75); East Hampton, New York, U.S.
- Occupation: Photographer

Hans Namuth (March 17, 1915 – October 13, 1990) was a German-born American photographer. He specialized in portraiture, photographing many artists, including abstract expressionist Jackson Pollock. His photos of Pollock at work in his studio increased Pollock's fame and recognition and led to a greater understanding of his work and techniques. Namuth used his outgoing personality and persistence to photograph many important artistic figures at work in their studios.

Namuth photographed many other painters such as Willem de Kooning, Robert Rauschenberg, and Mark Rothko and architects such as Frank Lloyd Wright, Philip Johnson, and Louis Kahn. Namuth focused on his rapport with his subjects, getting many reclusive figures such as Clyfford Still to agree to be photographed. Namuth's work not only captured his subjects in their studios with their works, but also captured the relationship between photographer and subject as well as the subjects' levels of self-consciousness. Besides famous art figures, Namuth photographed the Mam people of Todos Santos, whose native lifestyles were being overrun by Western influences. Namuth died in a Long Island car crash in 1990.

== Early life ==
Hans Namuth was born March 17, 1915 in Essen, German Empire. His interests in his youth were mainly politics and the arts. Namuth cites his mother as most responsible for encouraging his interest in music and the arts. As a teenager, Namuth became familiar with German expressionism and French impressionism through the Folkwang Museum. Namuth's father joined the Nazi Party in 1931 after becoming disillusioned due to an economic decline. This contrasted with the political views of his son, who found himself drawn to the liberal German Youth Movement. After Hans Namuth was arrested and briefly jailed for distributing anti-Nazi materials in July 1933, Namuth's father intervened and arranged for him to be sent to Paris. During his time in Paris, Namuth took an assortment of jobs including newspaper boy, researcher, and dishwasher.

Namuth befriended many German expatriates in Paris, including photographer Georg Reisner. In 1935, Reisner invited Namuth to assist him with his studio in Port de Pollença, Spain, and introduced the 20-year-old Namuth to photography. After several months, the two returned to Paris, supporting themselves with photojournalism and occasional portraits. Namuth and Reisner were sent to cover the Workers' Olympiad in July 1936 by French magazine Vu, which put them in Barcelona during the opening stages of the Spanish Civil War. Over the next nine months, the two photographed the war, providing photos to European publications. Namuth and Reisner returned to Paris in 1937 and continued their careers as photographers until 1939. While in Paris, Namuth studied with Joseph Breitenbach, who taught him the technical aspects of photography. After increased tension and hostilities between France and Germany, Namuth and his fellow German expatriates were interned, though Namuth joined the French Foreign Legion to avoid his confinement. After being discharged in 1940, Namuth fled to Marseille and escaped to the United States with the help of journalist Varian Fry and his Emergency Rescue Committee.

He arrived in New York City in 1941 and planned to join the Office of Strategic Services in 1943 out of a desire "to do something about everything". However, he had fallen in love with French-born Guatemalan Carmen Herrera and delayed his enlistment until he was drafted for World War II in December 1943. After completing basic training, Namuth joined the intelligence services and worked as an interrogator and interpreter in England, France, and Czechoslovakia. Upon returning to Germany in 1945 to gather war criminals, Namuth realized, "I really had cut my navel cord completely and totally, not just with my home and family but with the country as such. I was completely out of it." Namuth did not return to Germany until 1970.

With the conclusion of World War II, Namuth left the army, having been awarded the Purple Heart and Croix de Guerre. Namuth returned to New York determined to raise enough money for his family while keeping photography as a hobby. After working for a paper research company for about a year and a half, the company went bankrupt, leaving Namuth without a job. Namuth realized he had been "doing something that really was not my dish", and decided to return full-time to photography. He set up his kitchen as a darkroom and began doing location work for architecture magazines, as he had been interested in architecture and design. Namuth was introduced to Alexey Brodovitch, a photographer, instructor, and art director of Harper's Bazaar. Namuth began taking Brodovitch's classes at The New School of Social Research, where he learned how to develop ideas and how to engage the concepts of his images from Brodovitch. He began working for Harper's Bazaar, doing fashion photography, and later children's fashion photography.

== Jackson Pollock ==
One of Namuth's many photos of Jackson Pollock painting with his "drip" method

Hans Namuth was not initially interested in the work of Jackson Pollock, but was convinced by his teacher Alexey Brodovitch that Pollock was an important painter. In July 1950, Namuth approached Pollock and asked to photograph the artist working in his studio. Pollock agreed, encouraged by his wife, Lee Krasner, who was aware of the importance of media coverage. The resulting images helped to demystify Pollock's famous "drip" technique of painting, revealing it to be a deliberative process rather than a random splashing of paint. They "helped transform Pollock from a talented, cranky loner into the first media-driven superstar of American contemporary art, the jeans-clad, chain-smoking poster boy of abstract expressionism," according to acclaimed culture critic Ferdinand Protzman. Not satisfied with black and white stills, Namuth wanted to create a color film that managed to focus on Pollock and his painting at the same time, partially because he found more interest in Pollock's image than in his art. His solution was to have Pollock paint on a large sheet of glass as Namuth filmed from underneath the work. As Namuth could not afford professional lighting, the film was shot outside Pollock's Long Island home. This documentary (co-produced with Paul Falkenberg) is considered one of the most influential for artists.

In November 1950, Namuth and Pollock's relationship came to an abrupt conclusion. After coming in from the cold-weather shoot of the glass painting, Pollock, who had been treated in the 1930s for alcoholism, poured himself a tumbler of bourbon whiskey after supposedly having been sober for two years. An argument between Namuth and Pollock ensued with each calling the other a "phony", culminating in Pollock overturning a table of food and dinnerware in front of several guests. From then on, Pollock reverted to a more figure-oriented style of painting, leading some to say that Namuth's sessions robbed Pollock of his rawness and made Pollock come to feel disingenuous about doing things for the camera that he had originally done spontaneously. Art critic Jonathan Jones suggests that by filming Pollock, Namuth "broke the myth of trance" and by framing Pollock's work in the larger surrounding landscape, destroyed Pollock's view that his paintings were boundless. Jeffrey Potter, a close friend of Pollock's, described Namuth as commanding, frequently telling Pollock when to start and stop painting. According to Potter, Pollock "felt what was happening was phony." Namuth himself describes Pollock as being "very nervous and very self-conscious" of the filming at the time, but less so when Pollock discussed it in a later interview.

During his time with Pollock, Hans Namuth had created two films and captured more than 500 photographs of the artist. These photos were first published in 1951 in Portfolio, a journal edited by Alexey Brodovitch and Franz Zachary. After the death of Pollock in 1956, Namuth's photos grew in popularity and were often used in articles about the painter in place of Pollock's artwork itself. Art historian Barbara Rose states that the photographs changed art by focusing on the creation of art rather than the final product alone. Younger artists such as Bruce Nauman, Richard Serra, and Robert Morris were able not only to view Pollock's paintings, but, with Namuth's images, to see Pollock in the act of painting, giving rise to the popularity of Process Art. These photos have also allowed art historians to dissect the details of Pollock's method. For example, art historian Pepe Karmel found that Pollock's painting in Namuth's first black-and-white film began with several careful drippings forming two humanoid figures and a wolf before being covered beneath several layers of paint.

== Other artists ==
The popularity drawn from his work with Pollock helped Namuth gain access to other members of the abstract expressionist movement including Willem de Kooning and Mark Rothko. During the construction of de Kooning's studio over the years, Namuth photographed its progress as well as de Kooning's paintings from this period. Namuth took an especially large number of photos of de Kooning's Reclining Man, possibly indicating the painting's importance to Namuth or de Kooning. Namuth photographed many architects including Frank Lloyd Wright, Walter Gropius, and Louis Kahn.

== Later work ==
Namuth and his wife had first visited Guatemala in 1946 out of interest in his wife's native land and Namuth photographed the native Mam people of Todos Santos. Namuth returned in 1978 to survey the damage of an earthquake and was shocked to find the native customs of the Mam threatened by influences such as alcoholism. Namuth published these black-and-white photos in his 1989 book, Los Todos Santeros, in an effort to catalog and preserve images of the town's population and customs. He began to work regularly for Art News in 1979, producing 19 covers for the magazine over four years. Namuth died in 1990 in a Long Island automobile accident not far from where Pollock had similarly died in a car crash.

The full archive of Namuth's work is located at the Center for Creative Photography (CCP) at the University of Arizona in Tucson, which also manages the copyright of his work.

== Subject interaction and technique ==
Namuth found that the rapport he developed with his subjects was integral to making them feel comfortable being photographed while working. While Namuth was known to be a technically skilled photographer, his sociable and outgoing personality contributed largely to his notability in the New York art scene. Namuth was also persistent when persuading his subjects to agree to be photographed, including sculptor Joseph Cornell, who took two years to be convinced. He generally managed to put his subject at ease well enough so that they could work naturally in their environments without any artificial stiffness. Largely because of this, self-conscious artists such as Clyfford Still and Saul Steinberg agreed to be subjects for Namuth's photography. However, critic Sarah Boxer suggests that it is difficult to view photos of such artists without considering the possibility that they were trying to gain fame in a manner similar to Pollock. Though Namuth developed personal relationships with many of his subjects, art critic Hilton Kramer describes Namuth as "something of a hero worshiper."

Namuth's photographs included objects related to his subjects, such as paint tubes, items from around their homes, and their works of art. His photos also captured his own interactions with subjects, showing how comfortable they were at the time of shooting. Some subjects, such as Frank Stella, seemed to be intoxicated with the idea of being photographed by Namuth, while others, including Mark Rothko and Robert Rauschenberg, ignored Namuth during their photo sessions. Other photographs exude tension between photographer and subject, as if Namuth were an unwelcome guest in their workspace, as in the cases of artists Louise Nevelson and Jasper Johns. Often, Namuth's subjects are uncomfortable in front of the camera, as were architects Eero Saarinen and Buckminster Fuller. Almost all of Namuth's images of male artists, with the notable exception of Pollock, appear to be taking contemplative or otherwise self-absorbed poses.
