= Barbara Turner (screenwriter) =

American screenwriter and actress (1936–2016)

- Born: Gloria Rose Turner; July 14, 1936; Brooklyn, New York, U.S.
- Died: April 5, 2016 (aged 79); Los Angeles, California, U.S.
- Occupations: Screenwriter; actress
- Years active: 1957–2016
- Spouses: Vic Morrow (m. 1957; div. 1964) Reza Badiyi (m. 1968; div. 1985)
- Children: 3; including Jennifer Jason Leigh

Gloria Rose "Barbara" Turner (July 14, 1936 – April 5, 2016) was an American screenwriter and actress. The actress Jennifer Jason Leigh is her daughter.

== Early life ==
Gloria Rose Turner was born in Brooklyn, New York to Pearl Pauline (née Zises) and Alexander Turner. Her father was an Austrian Jewish immigrant, and her mother was born in New York, to Austrian Jewish parents.

Turner attended the University of Texas at Austin, where she studied acting. After a year of college, Turner moved back to New York, studying at Erwin Piscator's Dramatic Workshop and then with acting coach Paul Mann, where she met fellow actor Vic Morrow.

== Career ==
Turner moved to Los Angeles after Morrow was cast in the 1955 film Blackboard Jungle. During the 1950s and 1960s, Turner acted in many film and television productions, some included Playhouse 90, Mike Hammer, Ben Casey and The Breaking Point. Turner said that she began writing to fund her work as an actor. She and Morrow wrote a TV movie called Willie Loved Everybody; they adapted it into a musical that they tried pitching with Elmer Bernstein, but were not successful in selling the concept. The two separated and divorced in 1964.

During the early 1960s, Turner met and became friends with director Robert Altman, first meeting while working on an episode of Alfred Hitchcock Presents and then on his 1964 Kraft Suspense Theatre episode "Once Upon a Savage Night", which was expanded and broadcast as the TV movie Nightmare in Chicago. During filming, Turner met her second husband, producer and director Reza Badiyi, who encouraged her to write an adaptation of a Mira Michal short story from The New Yorker called "At Lake Laguna", which she brought to Altman to possibly make, but that fell apart right before production was scheduled to begin. Altman thought of Turner when he read John Haase's book Me and the Arch Kook Petulia. Turner wrote the original adaptation, which became the film Petulia.

Turner, Vic Morrow and Reza Badiyi were close friends and collaborators with the director Robert Altman, who later directed Leigh in Short Cuts (1993) and Kansas City (1996). Morrow directed his and Turner's 1965 screen adaptation of the Jean Genet play Deathwatch. In 1973, she wrote the screenplay for the TV movie The Affair, starring Natalie Wood and Robert Wagner. Her teleplay for the TV movie Freedom (1981) was based on her daughter Carrie's experiences in the 1970s as a teen runaway, played by family friend Mare Winningham. In 1983, Turner co-wrote an adaption of the Stephen King novel Cujo under the name Lauren Currier. Turner wrote an unproduced screenplay about two friends of Dorothy Parker named Gerald and Sara Murphy. This work led to her daughter, Leigh, being cast in the 1994 film Mrs. Parker and the Vicious Circle.

In 1995, she teamed up with daughter Jennifer Jason Leigh to write and produce the screenplay for Georgia, a film depicting the troubled relationship between two singing sisters played by Leigh and Mare Winningham, who both won praise for their performances. The idea reportedly came from Leigh, who was on location shooting the 1991 film Rush, and pitched the idea of two sisters who have varying degrees of skill as singer-songwriters. Turner created the script from that idea. It was financed by the French film production company Ciby 2000, and Turner's daughter, Morrow, served as a technical consultant. Turner spent three years doing research, using the Seattle music scene as a source for the material.

In 2000, Turner's screenplay adaption of the book Jackson Pollock: An American Saga by Steven Naifeh and Gregory White Smith for the Jackson Pollock biopic Pollock, also written by Susan Emswiller, became a successful film. She then collaborated with actress Neve Campbell on a screenplay titled The Company (2003) about the inner workings of the Joffrey Ballet, which was directed by Robert Altman. In an interview with Jan Lisa Huttner, Turner states that "the company is the star of this movie" rather than just Campbell. It is an ensemble piece. In June 2010, it was announced that Turner and Jerry Stahl had written a screenplay for an HBO film about Ernest Hemingway and his relationship with Martha Gellhorn. The film Hemingway & Gellhorn aired in 2012.

At the time of her death, Turner had written the script to the not-yet-released Candice Bergen-produced film titled Knock Wood: Charlie McCarthy Project, a movie based on Bergen's 1983 memoir of the same name. The story, produced by James Francis Trezza and Pam Widener (who Turner worked with on Pollack), unfolds from the perspective of Charlie McCarthy, Edgar Bergen's famous and hugely popular wooden puppet. Other long-time adaptations that were not produced but had been active in Hollywood were scripts based on Jane Smiley’s book Barn Blind, Michael Frayn's Headlong, and Jill Paton Walsh's Knowledge of Angels. Additional screenplays based on original work included Beautiful View, Once Again for Zelda, and Under Heaven.

== Personal life ==
Turner was married to actor and frequent collaborator Vic Morrow. Together they had two daughters, Carrie Morrow and actress Jennifer Jason Leigh. Turner and Morrow separated when Leigh was two years old.

From 1968 to 1985, Turner and Iranian American television director Reza Badiyi were married, with whom she had a daughter, actress Mina Badie, also known as Mina Badiyi Chassler. Barbara Turner died on April 5, 2016, in Los Angeles, aged 79, from undisclosed causes.

== Selected filmography ==
=== Screenwriter ===
- 1966: Deathwatch (adaptation)
- 1968: Petulia (adaptation)
- 1973: The Affair (TV movie)
- 1976: The Dark Side of Innocence (also known as The Hancocks) (NBC pilot)
- 1976: Widow (TV movie)
- 1976: The Dark Side of Innocence (TV movie)
- 1977: The War Between the Tates (TV movie) (adaptation)
- 1981: Freedom (TV movie)
- 1983: Sessions (TV movie), also producer
- 1983: Cujo (credited as Lauren Currier)
- 1987: Eye on the Sparrow (TV movie), also producer
- 1992: Somebody's Daughter (TV movie)
- 1994: Out of Darkness (TV movie)
- 1995: Georgia, also producer
- 2000: Pollock (adaptation)
- 2003: The Company
- 2012: Hemingway & Gellhorn (HBO) (TV movie), also executive producer
- Unknown: Knock Wood: Charlie McCarthy Project

=== Actor ===
- 1955: Two-Gun Lady as Jenny Ivers
- 1956: Medic (TV series) as Joyce in "The Glorious Red Gallagher"
- 1957: Monster from Green Hell as Lorna Lorentz
- 1957: M Squad (TV series) as Alice Snyder in "Street of Fear"
- 1957: Suspicion (TV series) as Emily in "Heartbeat"
- 1957: Mike Hammer (TV series) as Madeline Pope in "Now Die in It"
- 1958: Schlitz Playhouse (TV series) as Rose Genilli in "Heroes Never Group Up"
- 1958: Playhouse 90 (TV series) as Sandra in "Portrait of a Murderer"
- 1958: The Frank Sinatra Show (TV series) as Shirley in "The Brownstone Incident"
- 1958: Wink of an Eye as Judy Carlton
- 1958: Mike Hammer (TV series) as Doris in "My Son and Heir"
- 1960: The Lineup (TV series) as Eleanor Larsen in "Seven Sinners"
- 1961: Operation Eichmann as Sara
- 1961: Outlaws (TV series) as Mary Sawyer in "No Luck on Friday"
- 1962: Ben Casey (TV series) as Rose Hill in "I Hear America Singing"
- 1963: Alcoa Premiere (TV series) as Emma in "Lollipop Louie"
- 1963: Channing (TV series) as Renate Thielman in "A Hall Full of Strangers"
- 1963: Breaking Point (TV series) as Dorothy Oringer in "A Pelican in the Wilderness"
- 1964: Kraft Suspense Theatre (TV series) as Bernadette in "Once Upon a Savage Night" aka Nightmare in Chicago
- 1965: Ben Casey (TV series) as Fanny Birnbaum in "A Nightingale Named Nathan"
- 1966: The Virginian as Louise Devers in "Harvest of Strangers"
- 1967: La vuelta del Mexicano
- 1969: The Desperate Mission (TV movie) as The Farmer's Wife
- 1970: Soldier Blue as Mrs. Long (uncredited)
- 1974: En busca de un muro
- 2007: Margot at the Wedding

== Awards ==
- 1968: WGA Awards, Best Written American Drama, Petulia to Lawrence Marcus (nominee)
- 1976: Humanitas Prize, Widow (TV movie) (finalist)
- 1978: Primetime Emmy Award, Outstanding Writing for a Miniseries, Movie or a Dramatic Special, The War Between the Tates (nominee)
- 1987: Christopher Award, Eye on the Sparrow
- 1994: Humanitas Prize, 90 Minute Category, Out of Darkness (nominee)
- 2012: Primetime Emmy Award, Outstanding Miniseries or Movie, Hemingway & Gellhorn (nominee)
- 2013: WGA Awards, Long Form – Original, Hemingway & Gellhorn (nominee)
