= Kraft Suspense Theatre =

American television anthology series

- Also known as: Crisis; Suspense Theatre
- Genre: Anthology
- Theme music composer: John Williams
- Country of origin: United States
- Original language: English
- No. of seasons: 2
- No. of episodes: 60 (all episodes in color)

Production
- Executive producer: Frank P. Rosenberg
- Producers: Frank Telford; Robert Blees; Luther Davis; Joel Rogosin "Thomas Fitzroy"; Leon Benson; Arthur H. Nadel
- Camera setup: Single-camera
- Running time: 48 mins.
- Production companies: Roncom Films, Inc. Universal Television

Original release
- Network: NBC
- Release: October 10, 1963 – July 1, 1965

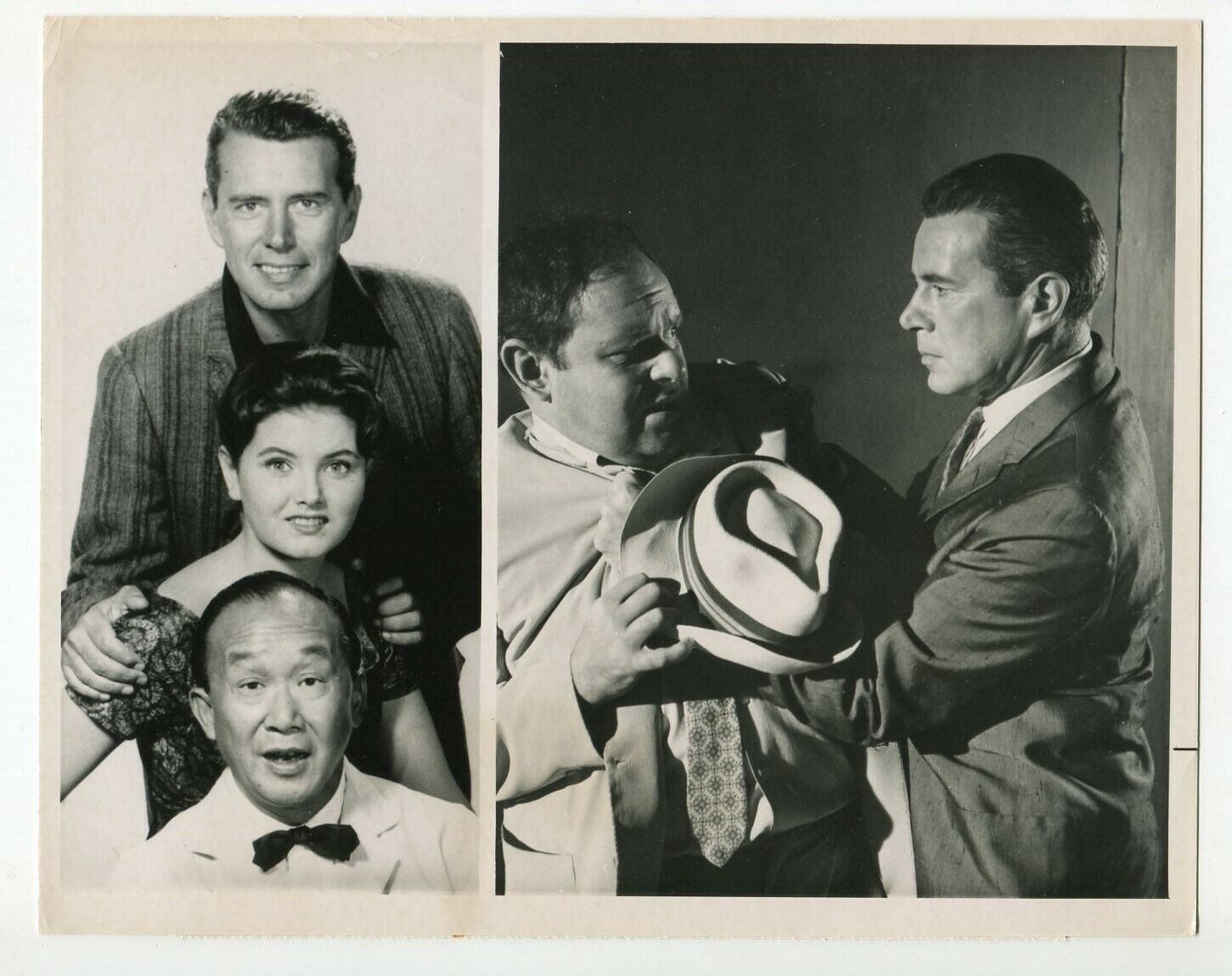
Kraft Suspense Theatre Press Photos featuring John Forsythe, Noreen Corcoran, Sammee Tong, and Jack Weston

The Kraft Suspense Theatre is an American television anthology series that was produced and broadcast from 1963 to 1965 on NBC. Sponsored by Kraft Foods, it was seen three weeks out of every four and was pre-empted for Perry Como's Kraft Music Hall specials once monthly. Como's production company, Roncom Films, also produced Kraft Suspense Theatre. (The company name, "Roncom Films" came from "RONnie COMo," Perry's son, who was in his early 20s when this series premiered). Writer, editor, critic, and radio playwright Anthony Boucher served as consultant on the series.

Later syndicated under the title Crisis, it was one of the few suspense series then broadcast in color. While most of NBC's shows were in color then, all-color network line-ups did not become the norm until the 1966-67 season. It was also packaged with episodes of Bob Hope Presents the Chrysler Theatre under the title Universal Star Time.

In Britain, BBC2 screened episodes of this series and Bob Hope Presents the Chrysler Theatre under the banner of Impact.

== Overview ==
Ben Cooper, Richard Crenna, Robert Duvall, John Forsythe, Ron Foster, Vivi Janiss, Brad Johnson, Jack Kelly, Robert Loggia, Ida Lupino, Martin Milner, Ellen McRae (who later changed her name to "Ellen Burstyn" and appeared as twin sisters in "The Deep End" with Clu Gulager and Aldo Ray), Leslie Nielsen, Larry Pennell, Mickey Rooney, James Whitmore, Jeffrey Hunter, Tippi Hedren, Telly Savalas, Robert Ryan, Clint Walker, and Michael Winkelman were among the actors and actresses cast on Kraft Suspense Theatre.

Directors included prominent names in television and later features, examples being Robert Altman, Richard L. Bare, Roy Huggins, Buzz Kulik, David Lowell Rich, Ida Lupino, Sydney Pollack, Elliot Silverstein, Jack Smight, Ralph Senensky, and Paul Wendkos.

Some episodes doubled as pilots for potential series. The episode "Rapture At Two-Forty", in particular, was the pilot for the series Run for Your Life, which premiered on NBC in the fall of 1965 and ran till 1968.

The 1968 theatrical film Sergeant Ryker, starring Lee Marvin, was a two-part made-for-television film that was first broadcast on Kraft Suspense Theatre under the title "The Case Against Paul Ryker". It also served as a pilot for the 1966 series Court Martial, which ABC would broadcast. Other episodes that were later expanded into theatrical films (initially for European release) included "Once Upon a Savage Night", released as Nightmare in Chicago, and "In Darkness, Waiting", which was released as Strategy of Terror.

== Episodes ==
=== Pilot: 1963 ===
No.	Title	Producer	Directed by	Written by	Original release date
1	"Shadow of a Man"	David Lowell Rich	David Lowell Rich	Story by : James Patrick; Teleplay by : Frank Fenton	June 19, 1963
Pilot for a never-realized potential series based on characters from James M. Cain's Double Indemnity, though Cain is uncredited. An insurance investigator tries to determine why a wealthy man is liquidating his assets. With Broderick Crawford, Jack Kelly, John Anderson, Ed Begley, and Beverley Owen. Originally aired as an episode of Kraft Mystery Theatre, as opposed to Kraft Suspense Theatre, this episode was later included with the other Suspense Theatre episodes in subsequent series syndication packages.

=== Season 1: 1963–64 ===
No. overall	No. in series	Title	Producer	Directed by	Written by	Original release date
2	1	"The Case Against Paul Ryker: Part 1"	Frank Telford	Buzz Kulik	Seeleg Lester & William D. Gordon	October 10, 1963
A Korean War sergeant is accused of treason, tried, and sentenced to die. With Lee Marvin, Bradford Dillman, Peter Graves, Vera Miles, and Lloyd Nolan. First half of pilot for Court Martial, which starred Dillman and Graves.
3	2	"The Case Against Paul Ryker: Part 2"	Frank Telford	Buzz Kulik	Seeleg Lester & William D. Gordon	October 17, 1963
Second half of pilot for Court Martial.
4	3	"The End of the World, Baby"	Robert Blees	Irvin Kershner	Story by : John Philip Cohane; Teleplay by : Luther Davis	October 24, 1963
An artist romances both a mother and her daughter. With Gig Young, Nina Foch, Katherine Crawford, and Peter Lorre.
5	4	"A Hero for Our Times"	Frank Telford	Ralph Senensky	David & Andy Lewis	October 31, 1963
A business executive who witnesses a murder doesn't want to get involved, even though his testimony could free an innocent man. With Lloyd Bridges, John Ireland, Geraldine Brooks, Dabbs Greer, and Sandra Church.
6	5	"Are There Any More Out There Like You?"	Robert Blees	Elliot Silverstein	Story by : George Cuomo; Teleplay by : Luther Davis	November 7, 1963
A teenager is implicated in a fatal car crash. With Robert Ryan, Katharine Ross, Sharon Farrell, and Adam Roarke.
7	6	"One Step Down"	Frank Telford	Bernard Girard	Story by : Alec Coppel; Teleplay by : William D. Gordon & Barry Trivers	November 14, 1963
A widow sets out to destroy the life of the woman who was found cheating with her husband. With Gena Rowlands, Leslie Nielsen, Jack Weston, and Ida Lupino.
8	7	"The Machine That Played God"	Luther Davis	Paul Wendkos	Story by : Judith Barrows & Robert Guy Barrows; Teleplay by : Robert Guy Barrows	December 5, 1963
A woman who was at the wheel of a fatal car crash submits to a polygraph test -- which pronounces her guilty of deliberate homicide. With Anne Francis, Gary Merrill, Malachi Throne, and Mary Wickes.
9	8	"The Long Lost Life of Edward Smalley"	Robert Altman	Robert Altman	Story by : David Moessinger & Robert Altman; Teleplay by : David Moessinger	December 12, 1963
A soldier accused of treason, but who was never given a chance to clear his name, takes matters into his own hands twenty years later. With James Whitmore and Richard Crenna.
10	9	"The Hunt"	Luther Davis (Note: Luther Davis produced this episode under his real name, and co-wrote the teleplay as "Paul Tuckahoe")	William Graham	Story by : John D.F. Black & Robert Altman & Ed Waters; Teleplay by : Ed Waters & "Paul Tuckahoe"	December 19, 1963
A sadistic sheriff lets prisoners escape, so he can enjoy the process of hunting them down. With Mickey Rooney, James Caan, Harry Townes, and Bruce Dern.
11	10	"The Name of the Game"	Robert Blees	Sydney Pollack	Story by : Fred Finklehoffe; Teleplay by : Frank Fenton	December 26, 1963
An oil executive and a professional gambler have a plan to break the bank at a Vegas casino. With Jack Kelly, Pat Hingle. Nancy Kovack, and Steve Ihnat.
12	11	"The Deep End"	Robert Blees	Francis D. Lyon	Story by : John D. MacDonald (novel The Drowner); Teleplay by : Jonathan Hughes	January 2, 1964
A detective investigates a suspicious drowning death. With Aldo Ray, Ellen Burstyn (billed as Ellen MacRae), Clu Gulager, and Tina Louise.
13	12	"A Truce to Terror"	"Thomas Fitzroy"	Robert Sparr	William P. McGivern	January 9, 1964
Trying to exact revenge on his assailant only gets a businessman deeper and deeper into danger. With Steve Forrest. Michael Ansara and John Gavin.
14	13	"Who is Jennifer?"	Luther Davis (Note: Luther Davis produced this episode under his real name, and co-wrote the teleplay as "Paul Tuckahoe")	Alvin Ganzer	Story by : George Slavin; Teleplay by : George Slavin & "Paul Tuckahoe"	January 16, 1964
A teenage delinquent with a mysterious past could be an heiress -- or could be the key to solving a long-ago murder. With Gloria Swanson, Dan Duryea, David Brian, and Brenda Scott.
15	14	"Leviathan Five"	"Thomas Fitzroy"	David Lowell Rich	Story by : Berne & David Giler; Teleplay by : Berne & David Giler & William P. McGivern	January 30, 1964
Five people are trapped after an underground explosion, and must decide who dies once they realize there's only enough oxygen for four. With Arthur Kennedy, Robert Webber, and Andrew Duggan.
16	15	"My Enemy, This Town"	Robert Blees	Richard L. Bare	Story by : John Whittier; Teleplay by : Frank Fenton	February 6, 1964
A just-released prisoner has a plan to get even with the woman he blames for putting him in jail. With Scott Marlowe, Diane McBain, and Philip Carey.
17	16	"The Action of the Tiger"	Frank Telford	Richard Irving	Sam Dann	February 20, 1964
During WWII, an American pilot is shot down, and tries to effect an escape from a POW camp. With Telly Savalas, Ulla Jacobsson, Peter Brown, and Stephen McNally.
18	17	"Doesn't Anyone Know Who I Am?"	Luther Davis (Note: Luther Davis produced this episode under his real name, and wrote the teleplay as "Paul Tuckahoe")	William Graham	Story by : "Thomas Fitzroy"; Teleplay by : "Paul Tuckahoe"	February 27, 1964
A henpecked husband is attacked by a hitchhiker, and becomes an amnesiac. With Cornel Wilde, Kathryn Crosby, and Martha Hyer.
19	18	"The Threatening Eye"	Jo Swerling Jr.	Ida Lupino	Howard Browne	March 12, 1964
A beautiful but sinster young French-Canadian woman determinedly stalks a seemingly average -- and married -- man. With Jack Klugman, Annie Farge, Pat O'Brien, Dabney Coleman, and Phyllis Thaxter.
20	19	"A Cause of Anger"	Joel Rogosin	Richard L. Bare	Story by : Richard Wormser; Teleplay by : William D. Gordon	March 19, 1964
A young mentally disturbed boy is kidnapped, right under the nose of the detective that was supposed to be guarding him. With Brian Keith, Nancy Malone, and Audrey Totter.
21	20	"Knight's Gambit"	Robert Blees	Walter E. Grauman	Story by : Robert Blees; Teleplay by : Lorenzo Semple Jr. & Halsted Welles	March 26, 1964
A carefully contrived blackmail plot goes horribly wrong. With Eleanor Parker, Roger Smith, and Chester Morris.
22	21	"Once Upon a Savage Night"	Robert Altman	Robert Altman	Story by : William P. McGivern (novella Death on the Turnpike); Teleplay by : David Moessinger	April 2, 1964
A crewman jumps ship in Chicago, unaware that his suitcase carries a bomb. With Charles McGraw, Robert Ridgely, Ted Knight, Philip Abbott, Mary Frann, and Barbara Turner. Later expanded (with additional footage) into the feature length TV movie Nightmare in Chicago.
23	22	"Portrait of an Unknown Man"	Joel Rogosin	Alan Crosland, Jr.	Robert Guy Barrows	April 16, 1964
An isolated, anti-social hermit is regarded with increasing suspicion by the residents of a nearby town. With Clint Walker, Mala Powers, Robert Duvall, and Jay C. Flippen.
24	23	"Their Own Executioners"	Luther Davis	Walter E. Grauman	Story by : Robert Cenedella (novel A Little to the East); Teleplay by : Luther Davis	April 23, 1964
A murder trial seems to find an attorney working against the interest of his client, who wants to be found guilty -- and put to death. With Dean Stockwell, Lilia Skala, Dabney Coleman, and Herschel Bernardi.
25	24	"The Sweet Taste of Vengeance"	"Thomas Fitzroy" (Note: Roy Huggins produced this episode under the pseudonym "Thomas Fitzroy", directed it under his real name, and wrote the story as "John Francis O'Mara")	Roy Huggins	Story by : "John Francis O'Mara"; Teleplay by : Frank Fenton	April 30, 1964
A divorcee flees to Brazil with two million dollars; a private eye is tasked with getting it back. With John Forsythe, Diana Hyland, and Jack Weston.
26	25	"Charlie, He Couldn't Kill a Fly"	Robert Blees	Bernard Girard	Irving Pearlberg	May 7, 1964
Enjoying the notoriety it brings him, Charlie Kling confesses to a murder. With Keenan Wynn, Beverly Garland, and Richard Kiley.
27	26	"The Watchman"	Jack Laird	Sydney Pollack	David Rayfiel	May 14, 1964
An American secret agent is hot on the trail of a vanished scientist and a vital secret formula. With Jack Warden, Victoria Shaw, and Telly Savalas.
28	27	"The Robrioz Ring"	David Lowell Rich	David Lowell Rich	Story by : Patrick Quentin (short story Love Comes to Miss Lucy); Teleplay by : James Gunn	May 28, 1964
A vacationing schoolteacher buys an ornate ring she likes, but its original owner wants it back ... at any cost. With Julie Harris, Julie Adams, and Robert Loggia.
29	28	"A Cruel and Unusual Night"	"Thomas Fitzroy"	Leslie H. Martinson	David Moessinger	June 4, 1964
An escaped convict kidnaps the judge who sentenced him. With Ronald Reagan, Scott Marlowe, and Anne Helm.

=== Season 2: 1964–65 ===
John T. Williams's theme music was revised for this season.

No. overall	No. in series	Title	Producer	Directed by	Written by	Original release date
30	1	"The World I Want"	Jack Laird	Elliot Silverstein	Halsted Welles	October 1, 1964
The relationship between a deaf-mute and a schoolgirl is complicated by both money and violence. With Jo Van Fleet, Albert Dekker, Sal Mineo, and Leonard Nimoy.
31	2	"Operation Grief"	Mort Abrahams	Jack Smight	Jerome Ross	October 8, 1964
An American sergeant begins to suspect one of his charges may be a Nazi infiltrator. With Robert Goulet, Claude Akins and Nicholas Colasanto.
32	3	"A Lion Amongst Men"	Arthur H. Nadel	Jack Smight	Anthony Ellis	October 22, 1964
A Korean war veteran tries to establish a paramilitary organization called "The U.S. Vigilance Committee", which has uncomfortably fascist ideals. With James Whitmore, Arch Johnson, and Tommy Sands.
33	4	"That He Should Weep for Her"	Mort Abrahams	Bernard Girard	Story by : Irving Pearlberg; Teleplay by : Halsted Welles & George Kirgo	November 5, 1964
A jeweler kills a young man who was attempting to rob his store, and the young man's sister vows to get even. With Milton Berle and Carol Lawrence.
34	5	"The Kamchatka Incident"	Arthur H. Nadel	Ron Winston	Paul & Margaret Schneider	November 12, 1964
A plane carrying a defecting Russian is caught in a hurricane, and sent far off course into Russian territory. With John Forsythe, Roger Perry, and Leslie Parrish .
35	6	"The Jack Is High"	Mort Abrahams	Ralph Senensky	William Wood	November 19, 1964
A quiet English professor masterminds a multi-million dollar robbery. With Henry Jones, Edd Byrnes, Pat O'Brien, and Larry Storch.
36	7	"Graffiti"	Unknown	Unknown	Richard L. Adams	November 26, 1964
During World War II, when Nazis unwittingly capture a French resistance leader, his followers try to arrange his escape before the Nazis realize the importance of their prisoner. With Richard Angarola, Robert Ellenstein, and Philippe Forquet .
37	8	"One Tiger to a Hill"	Arthur H. Nadel	Jack Arnold	Robert Hamner	December 3, 1964
A master thief believes he has the perfect alibi for his latest jewelry heist; he was sitting in the same restaurant as the chief of detectives. With Barry Nelson, James Gregory, Diane McBain, and Peter Brown.
38	9	"Threepersons"	Alex March	Alex March	Theodore Taylor	December 10, 1964
During Prohibition, a Texas lawman tries to recruit a local Native American to join the fight against racketeering. With John Gavin, Ralph Meeker and Vincent Gardenia.
39	10	"The Gun"	Luther Davis	Michael O'Herlihy	Robert Guy Barrows	December 24, 1964
A dentist and his wife are held up at gunpoint. With Eddie Albert, Dina Merrill, and Peter Lazer.
40	11	"The Wine-Dark Sea"	Jo Swerling Jr.	Elliot Silverstein	Story by : Dean Hargrove; Teleplay by : Howard Browne	December 31, 1964
An down-and-out alcoholic tries to prove his skid row acquaintance didn't commit a murder. With Roddy McDowall, Myrna Fahey, and John Larkin.
41	12	"In Darkness, Waiting: Part 1"	Arthur H. Nadel	Jack Smight	Robert L. Joseph	January 14, 1965
A newspaper reporter and a police officer investigate a series of assassinations, which seem to be targeted at destroying the UN. With Val Avery, Jeff Cooper, Neil Hamilton, Mort Mills and Will Corry.
42	13	"In Darkness, Waiting: Part 2"	Arthur H. Nadel	Jack Smight	Robert L. Joseph	January 21, 1965
Continued from part 1. Parts 1 & 2 were re-edited into the feature film Strategy of Terror, which was issued theatrically in 1969.
43	14	"That Time in Havana"	Mort Abrahams	Alex March	Story by : Irving Gaynor; Teleplay by : William Wood	February 11, 1965
In Cuba, a woman teams up with a reporter to track down her missing husband, and a million dollars. With Steve Forrest, Victor Jory, and Dana Wynter.
44	15	"Four Into Zero"	Arthur H. Nadel	Don Weis	Story by : Milt Rosen; Teleplay by : Don Brinkley	February 18, 1965
A man who married into money wants to prove he could have been wealthy on his own, so he plans a multi-million dollar train heist. With Jack Kelly, Martha Hyer, and Robert Conrad.
45	16	"Streetcar, Do You Read Me?"	Arthur H. Nadel	Leon Benson	Story by : Alice Lent Covert; Teleplay by : Henry Searls	February 25, 1965
An inexperienced co-pilot is forced to take over a flight after an on-board explosion. With Martin Milner, Richard Long, and Jack Ging.
46	17	"The Last Clear Chance"	Mort Abrahams	Sydney Pollack	Abraham Polonsky	March 11, 1965
During World War II, a Frenchman and an American plan their escape from a prisoner of war camp. With Bruce Bennett, Leslie Bradley, and Alan Caillou.
47	18	"Won't It Ever Be Morning?"	Ray Wagner	David Lowell Rich	Larry Marcus	March 18, 1965
The manager of a jazz singer is accused of murder. With John Cassavetes, Gena Rowlands, and Jack Klugman.
48	19	"Nobody Will Ever Know"	Mort Abrahams	Don Weis	Story by : Roger H. Lewis; Teleplay by : Richard Fielder & Harry Essex	March 25, 1965
A researcher is under pressure at home to secure a raise. But with no raise forthcoming, he begins to sell company secrets for extra cash ... and discovers he's now in a trap he can't escape. With Tom Tryon and Pippa Scott.
49	20	"The Green Felt Jungle"	Roy Huggins (Note: Roy Huggins was credited under his actual name as producer for this episode, and as "Thomas Fitzroy" for the story.)	Irving J. Moore	Story by : "Thomas Fitzroy"; Teleplay by : Howard Browne	April 1, 1965
A district attorney whose wife was killed by organized crime resigns so he can fight the syndcate as a private citizen. Pilot for a series that was never made. With Leslie Nielsen, MacDonald Carey, and Richard Conte.
50	21	"Rapture at Two-Forty"	Jo Swerling Jr.	William Graham	Story by : Jo Swerling Jr. Teleplay by : Luther Davis	April 15, 1965
A businessman who has only a short time to live decides to embark on a life of leisure and adventure in France. Pilot for Run for Your Life. With Ben Gazzara, Katherine Crawford, Antoinette Bower, and Michael Rennie.
51	22	"Jungle Of Fear"	Howard Christie	Earl Bellamy	John McGreevey	April 22, 1965
In Panama, a casino owner becomes involved with a young mother and child who are trying to escape from political enemies. Pilot for a series that was never made. With Robert Fuller, Robert Loggia, and Ann Blyth.
52	23	"Kill No More"	Arthur H. Nadel	Tom Gries	Story by : Larry Cohen; Teleplay by : Larry Cohen and William Wood	April 29, 1965
The neglected wife of nuclear scientist discovers a plot to steal his plans for a new type of bomb. With Lew Ayres, Robert Webber, Julie Adams, and Leonard Nimoy.
53	24	"The Long Ravine"	Jon Epstein	Leon Benson	Story by : Halsted Welles; Teleplay by : Anthony Ellis	May 6, 1965
A family hopes to strike it rich in a long-dormant mining town. With Jack Lord, Andrew Prine, and Broderick Crawford.
54	25	"The Easter Breach"	Norman MacDonnell	Ralph Senensky	Leon Tokatyan	May 13, 1965
A man desperate to get his wife out of East Berlin accidentally comes across a woman who could be his wife's double, and hatches a plan involving changed identities. With Richard Beymer and Katherine Crawford.
55	26	"The Safe House"	Arthur H. Nadel	Tom Gries	Richard L. Adams	May 20, 1965
A Nazi war criminal who has long been in hiding attempts to escape from Switzerland to the Middle East. With Steven Hill and Francis Lederer.
56	27	"Twixt the Cup and the Lip"	Arthur H. Nadel	Leon Benson	Story by : Julian Symons (same-titled short story); Teleplay by : Don Brinkley	June 3, 1965
A mild-mannered art gallery worker gets fired—and in retaliation, gets involved in a daring robbery of his former workplace. With Ethel Merman, John Hoyt, and Larry Blyden.
57	28	"The Trains of Silence"	Leon Benson	Douglas Heyes	Story by : Ben Maddow; Teleplay by : William Wood	June 10, 1965
A wealthy investor starts to worry he's placed his money in an enterprise that he doesn't fully understand. With Jeffrey Hunter, Tippi Hedren, Warren Stevens, and Lloyd Bochner.
58	29	"Kill Me on July 20"	Frank Telford	Robert Douglas	Story by : Joan Didion & John Gregory Dunne; Teleplay by : George Kirgo	June 17, 1965
A guilt-wracked man hires a killer to assassinate him, so that his family can benefit from his life insurance. With Jack Kelly, Kathryn Hays, and Stefan Arngrim. Episode writer George Kirgo has a cameo as the killer.
59	30	"The Rise and Fall of Eddie Carew"	Devery Freeman	Joseph Pevney	Story by : Robert Thom and Don Brinkley; Teleplay by : Don Brinkley	June 24, 1965
An imprisoned safecracker is called upon to use his skills to save an elderly banker trapped in a locked vault. With Dean Jones, Sheilah Wells, Jerome Cowan, Ken Lynch and Ian Wolfe.
60	31	"Connery's Hands"	Leon Benson	Leon Benson	William Wood	July 1, 1965
A businessman has an elaborate revenge plan for his wife's piano-playing ex-lover. With Gary Lockwood, Don Gordon, Sally Kellerman, and Peter Breck.

== Syndication ==
Reruns of the series have been shown under the name Suspense Theatre, although many prints of episodes have had the syndicated rerun title Crisis. In the 1990s, Sci-Fi Channel aired the series under the Suspense Theatre and Crisis titles as part of its late-night primetime programming lineup (although the series has no science fiction elements whatsoever). Retro TV and Antenna TV, the small broadcast networks, ran the series in the early 2010s.
