= Cindy Carol =

American actress

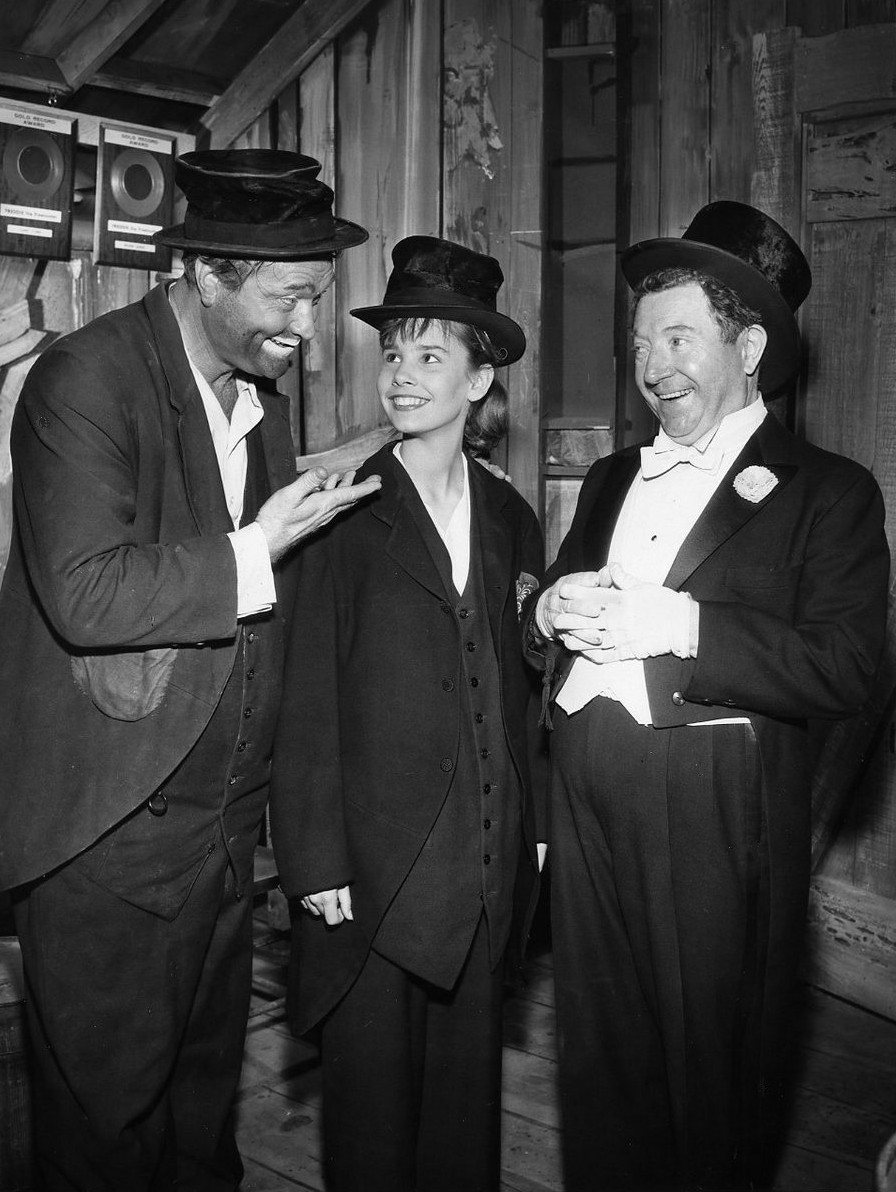
- L-R: Red Skelton, Carol Sydes, and Frank McHugh on The Red Skelton Show (1959)
- Born: Annette Carol Sydes; October 11, 1944 (age 81); Los Angeles, California, U.S.
- Other name: Carol Sydes
- Education: North Hollywood High School
- Occupations: Stage, film, television actress
- Years active: 1955–1966
- Known for: Gidget Goes to Rome; Leave It to Beaver; Cape Fear; The New Loretta Young Show
- Spouses: Kent L. Coombs (m. 1964; div. 1968) Christopher Connelly (m. 1969; died 1988)
- Children: 2

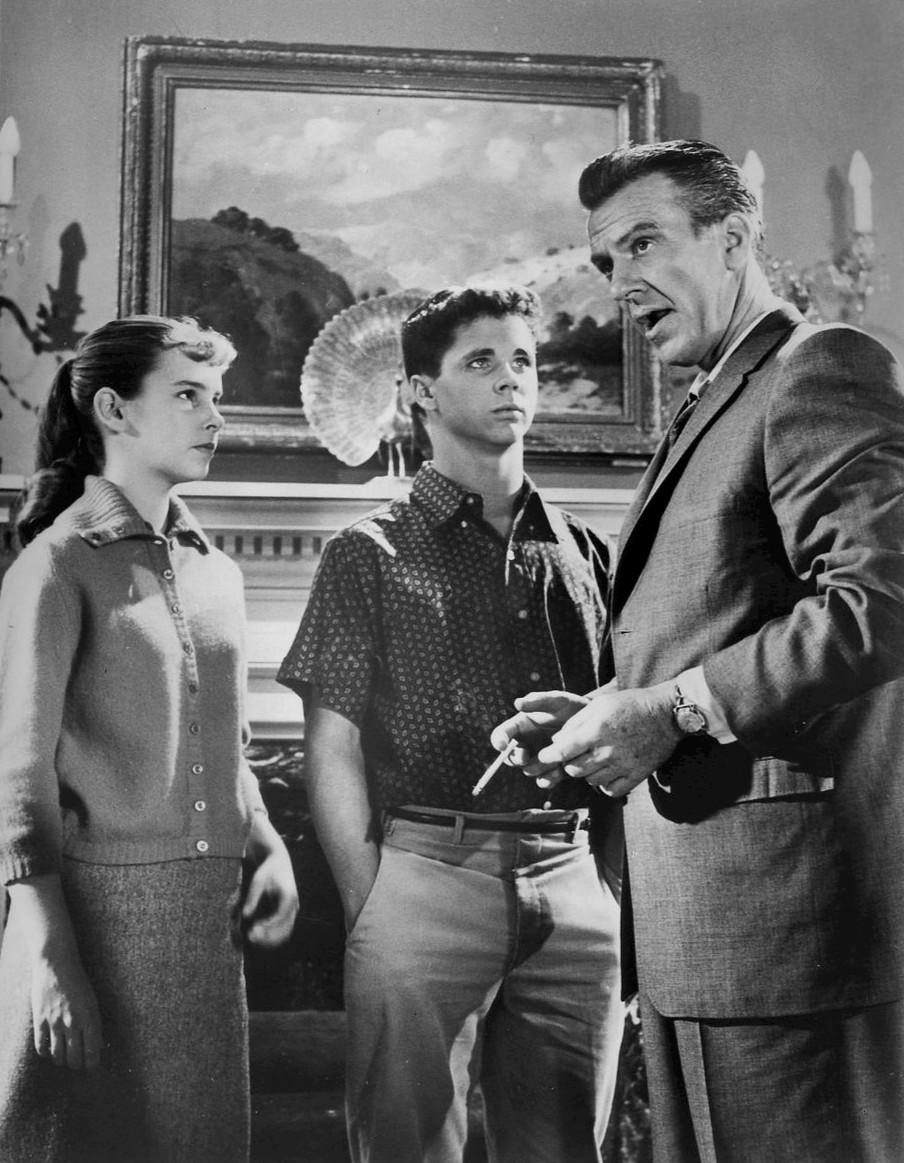
Carol Sydes, Tony Dow, and Hugh Beaumont on Leave It to Beaver (1960)

Cindy Carol (born Annette Carol Sydes; October 11, 1944) is an American actress. She was credited as Carol Sydes before her starring role as Gidget in Gidget Goes to Rome (1963).

== Personal ==
She was born to Thomas and Ruth Sydes, who had three other children: Anthony, Jonathan, and Debbie, Her father was a high school English teacher, and she attended North Hollywood High School, where she was a cheerleader.

== Career ==
Carol's first recorded role was as an uncredited schoolgirl in Good Morning, Miss Dove (1955).

Under the name of Carol Sydes, she made a guest appearance in an episode of Medic that same year. This was followed by guest appearances in seven episodes of Leave It to Beaver in the years 1957–60, four of them in the role of Alma Hanson, the other three (one uncredited) in various other roles. Following guest appearances on My Three Sons in 1961 and The Donna Reed Show in 1962, she played the roles of Betty in the film Cape Fear and Binkie Massey in the 1962–63 CBS television series The New Loretta Young Show, which ran only for 26 weeks.

In 1963, taking the new stage name of Cindy Carol, she starred as Gidget in the third and final Gidget feature film, Gidget Goes to Rome. The role had previously been played by Sandra Dee and Deborah Walley.

Carol subsequently made a single guest appearance in Vacation Playhouse in 1964. Then in 1965 she appeared as Susan in the television series Never Too Young, and starred as Pandora Leaf in the James Stewart family comedy Dear Brigitte.
