= Wink of an Eye (film) =

1958 film

- Theatrical release poster
- Directed by: Winston Jones
- Screenplay by: James Edmiston
- Story by: Chester Davis; Winston Jones
- Produced by: Fernando Carrere
- Starring: Jonathan Kidd; Doris Dowling; Barbara Turner; Irene Seidner; Jaclynne Greene; Wally Brown
- Cinematography: William P. Whitley
- Edited by: Stefan Arnsten
- Music by: Ernest Gold; Max Rich; Jack Scholl
- Production company: Ivan Tors Productions
- Distributed by: United Artists
- Release date: June 1958
- Running time: 72 minutes
- Country: United States
- Language: English

Wink of an Eye is a 1958 American comedy film directed by Winston Jones and written by James Edmiston. The film stars Jonathan Kidd, Doris Dowling, Barbara Turner, Irene Seidner, Jaclynne Greene and Wally Brown. The film was released in June 1958, by United Artists.

== Plot ==
Meek, henpecked Alvin Atterbury is a chemist for a perfume factory. Unhappy at home and work, he begins keeping company with a co-worker, Myrna Duchane. He spends a great deal of time at home doing experiments in his basement.

Atterbury's wife disappears one day. A lodger, law student Judy Carlton, arrives unexpectedly, having been rented a room by Atterbury's wife. Judy and a neighbor, Mrs. Lazlow, both begin to suspect foul play in Mrs. Atterbury's absence and express concerns to Cantrick, the town sheriff.

Denying that anything is occurring in his cellar except work-related research, Atterbury is cleared of suspicion when his wife suddenly returns, having been away at a sanitarium. But as soon as all suspicions are averted, Atterbury begins to concoct a new experiment.

== Cast ==
- Jonathan Kidd as Alvin Atterbury
- Doris Dowling as Myrna Duchane
- Barbara Turner as Judy Carlton
- Irene Seidner as Mrs. Lazlow
- Jaclynne Greene as Mrs. Atterbury
- Wally Brown as Sheriff Cantrick
- Taylor Holmes as Mr. Vanryzin
- Max Rich as Max
- Paul Smith as Ben Lazlow
- Jack Grinnage as Delivery Boy
- Lucien Littlefield as Old Man
- Rodney Bell as Rand
- Dick Nelson as Butler
- Sam E. Levin as Trumpet player
- Howard Roberts as Guitar player
- Henry Slate as Attendant
- Thomas Browne Henry as Mr. Hix
