= Nightmare in Chicago =

- Title card
- Also known as: "Once Upon a Savage Night"
- Based on: Killer on the Turnpike by William P. McGivern
- Screenplay by: Donald Moessinger
- Directed by: Robert Altman
- Starring: Charles McGraw; Robert Ridgely; Ted Knight; Philip Abbott; Barbara Turner
- Composer: John Williams
- Country of origin: United States
- Original language: English

Production
- Cinematography: Bud Thackery
- Editors: Danford B. Greene; Larry D. Lester
- Running time: 81 minutes (TV movie version)
- Production company: Roncom Films

Original release
- Network: NBC
- Release: April 2, 1964

Nightmare in Chicago is a 1964 suspense thriller crime television film produced and directed by Robert Altman, based on the novella Killer on the Turnpike by William P. McGivern. It was originally filmed as an episode of the NBC series Kraft Suspense Theatre titled "Once Upon a Savage Night" before being expanded into the TV movie.

== Plot ==
The film takes place over the course of a single winter's day and night some time before Christmas. Police in Rockford, Illinois are concerned about a serial killer dubbed "Georgie Porgie" who preys on blondes and recently killed his fifth victim in Pinhook, Indiana. He strikes again, strangling a woman in a strip club in the middle of Chicago, and the police find his car abandoned on the road near an Illinois Tollway oasis. "Georgie Porgie" kills a man outside the oasis and steals his car. A waitress remembers that he was wearing sunglasses and a doctor theorizes that this could be necessitated by a form of mydriasis. The police set up blocks along the maze of toll roads in Chicago to trap the killer, shining a flashlight in the eyes of all drivers who pass through, but a nuclear missile convoy codenamed "Long John" moving through the Chicago area also needs to get through at the same time, greatly complicating matters.

"Georgie Porgie" parks his car sideways in the middle of the road, causing multiple crashes until he is picked up by a good Samaritan, whom he kills in order to steal his car. Concerned about the convoy, Harry Brockman suggests stopping it at the Hinsdale oasis but Commissioner Lombardo rejects the idea. "Georgie Porgie" returns to the oasis where he saw a blonde waitress who intrigued him but instead kidnaps her brunette coworker Bernadette as she is leaving. When she pleads with him not to kill a man he is strangling, he listens and lets the man live, locking him up before stealing his Illinois Tollway maintenance truck. He merges with the convoy, pretending that he needs to remain with it until it passes through the checkpoints.

The police note that the maintenance truck is not authorized to be part of the convoy and stop it at the next checkpoint. When a policeman shines a flashlight in his eyes, "Georgie Porgie" screams in pain and leaps out of the car but is caught by policemen with flashlights surrounding him on all sides. As he is put in the police car he continuously cries out for his dead sister. Bernadette takes his sunglasses from the floor of the truck and the policemen plan out the rest of their morning as the sun rises. Commissioner Lombardo plans on playing handball while Brockman and McVea head back to the office to file reports.

== Cast ==
- Charles McGraw as Harry Brockman
- Robert Ridgely as Dan McVea
- Ted Knight as Carl Lombardo
- Philip Abbott as Myron Ellis aka "Georgie Porgie"
- Barbara Turner as Bernadette
- Charlene Lee as Wynnette
- Douglas A. Alleman as Ralph
- Arlene Kieta as The Blond
- John A. Alonzo as Officer Miller
- Robert H. Harris as Officer Newman (as Robert Harris)
- Mary Frann as Annette
- Jan Marsh as Dancer

== Production ==
Nightmare in Chicago was originally filmed as an episode of the NBC series Kraft Suspense Theatre titled "Once Upon a Savage Night" before being expanded into the TV movie. "Once Upon a Savage Night" was filmed on location in Chicago, Illinois, with high-speed 35mm positive color stock. During filming, Barbara Turner met her second husband, producer and director Reza Badiyi. The Associate Producer was Robert Eggenweiler, who worked as an Associate Producer with Altman on several other films such as Brewster McCloud, McCabe and Mrs. Miller, Nashville, and Buffalo Bill and the Indians.
