= Dear Brigitte =

1965 film by Henry Koster

- Theatrical release poster
- Directed by: Henry Koster
- Screenplay by: Hal Kanter; Nunnally Johnson (uncredited)
- Based on: Erasmus with Freckles by John Haase
- Produced by: Henry Koster
- Starring: James Stewart; Fabian; Glynis Johns; Cindy Carol; Billy Mumy; John Williams; Jack Kruschen; Ed Wynn
- Cinematography: Lucien Ballard
- Edited by: Marjorie Fowler
- Music by: George Duning
- Production companies: A Fred Kohlmar Production; 20th Century Fox
- Distributed by: 20th Century Fox
- Release date: January 8, 1965
- Running time: 100 minutes
- Country: United States
- Language: English
- Budget: $2.47 million
- Box office: $2.2 million (US and Canada rentals)

Dear Brigitte is a 1965 American DeLuxe Color CinemaScope family comedy film produced and directed by Henry Koster, based on the 1963 novel Erasmus with Freckles by John Haase. Starring James Stewart, it is the third of three family comedy vehicles for Stewart that are directed by Koster and written by Nunnally Johnson, following Mr. Hobbs Takes a Vacation (1962) and Take Her, She's Mine (1963). The title character, Brigitte Bardot, makes an uncredited appearance as herself.

== Plot ==
Robert Leaf is an American college professor and accordionist, who won a Pulitzer for poetry and prizes the arts. Robert and his wife Vina are dedicated to the arts and prompt their children Pandora and Erasmus to develop artistic skills. The Leaf family lives on a houseboat in San Francisco. The Captain sold the boat to the Leafs and lives with them; he provides narration.

Professor Leaf, in particular, is dismayed to discover that eight-year-old Erasmus is tone-deaf and colorblind, for he cannot share the family's artistic pursuits. Moreover, Erasmus is a mathematical prodigy. The Professor is wary, wanting him to understand that this is only one part of his life. Erasmus agrees, but unwittingly calls media attention to himself by correcting figures at a bank. His parents become very determined that he have a normal child's life, and they decide to have him talk to a psychiatrist. Erasmus tells the psychiatrist that math is okay, but he really loves French movie star Brigitte Bardot and writes her love letters.

Eighteen-year-old Pandora and her friends pay Erasmus to do their math homework (he uses the money for airmail stamps to send his letters to Brigitte). The Leafs take Erasmus for testing at the university; he agrees to be tested if they will pay him. He answers questions correctly before the computer can calculate, so the officials push for more tests. The Leafs refuse, wanting him to have a normal childhood; besides, Erasmus wants to leave.

Called to the Dean's office, a sheriff informs the Professor that Erasmus has been using his skills to calculate bets for an undercover campus betting ring that is run by Ken Taylor, Panny's boyfriend, who was paying him to pick winners. Accused of complicity, the Professor quits his job and storms home. He and Vina question Ken and Panny. When paid, Erasmus shows his parents that he calculates winners by reading daily racetrack newspaper entries; Panny reveals that he spends his earnings on stamps. Troubled, his parents decide that what Erasmus is doing is morally and ethically wrong.

The Professor applies for unemployment, and is told that he must wait two weeks for a check. Erasmus gives him the money that he has saved from doing math problems, so that Panny can have a new prom dress. While buying it, they meet Dr. Peregrine Upjohn, who admires the Professor. That evening, the Professor is delighted to learn from Erasmus's psychiatrist that his son loves Brigitte Bardot, for Erasmus has been unhappy with the attention paid to his math skills, and this is such a regular interest.

Upjohn proposes that they found the Leaf Foundation to fund liberal arts scholarships. The Professor and Vina love the idea. During their talk, students march to the houseboat, demanding that the Professor return to work; he accepts and announces the Foundation. Conferring, the Leafs decide that it is not unethical to ask Erasmus if they can use his talent to raise funds for such a good cause.

Brigitte invites Erasmus to visit her in France. Upjohn suggests that Erasmus go, for it will promote the Foundation. The Professor accompanies him; Upjohn assisting with their flight costs from Foundation funds. At Brigitte's house, Erasmus adoringly stares at her, barely speaking, and asks for her autograph. The Professor takes a picture of them together despite Erasmus looking at Brigitte, not at the camera. She gives him a puppy from her pet poodle and thinks that he is adorable.

On returning, Erasmus calculates different bets to raise funds. While falling asleep one night, he says, "Fromage", leading the adults to think that he is picking the long shot "French Cheese" in the sixth race. At the track the next day, he denies picking her, to everyone's horror. French Cheese wins the race, and the family is ecstatic. The Professor realizes that Upjohn, who held the tickets, has left the stands. Upjohn, who is actually a con artist and plans to abscond with the funds, is collecting the winnings. The Professor finds him and grabs the bag of money, declaring that it is for the Foundation. The Dean affirms this statement. The press overhears the exchange and asks for a photo op of the Professor, the Dean and the Foundation's new endowment.

== Cast ==
- James Stewart as Professor Leaf
- Fabian as Kenneth
- Glynis Johns as Vina
- Cindy Carol as Pandora
- Billy Mumy as Erasmus
- John Williams as Upjohn
- Jack Kruschen as Dr. Volker
- Charles Robinson as George
- Howard Freeman as Dean Sawyer
- Jane Wald as Terry
- Alice Pearce as Unemployment Clerk
- Jesse White as Argyle
- Gene O'Donnell as Lt. Rink
- Orville Sherman as Von Schlogg
- Maida Severn as School Teacher
- Clive Clerk as Student
- Pitt Herbert as Bank Manager
- Adair Jameson as Saleslady
- Marcel de la Brosse as Taxi Driver
- Ed Wynn as The Captain (also the narrator, who frequently breaks the fourth wall)

Uncredited (in order of appearance)
William Fawcett	Elderly man who approaches Prof. Leaf on university campus
Joseph Hoover	Reporter covering story of Erasmus as mathematical prodigy
Percy Helton	Man at computer lab: "Doctor Leaf may I impose for a moment..."
Dick Lane (voice only)	Racetrack announcer heard on radio by Leaf family and Kenneth
Susanne Cramer	Upjohn's blonde companion at prom dress store
James Brolin	University student at head of demonstration supporting Professor Leaf
William Henry	Racetrack cashier who takes bets from Argyle
Ted Mapes	Mister Rudy, mailman who delivers Brigitte Bardot's letter to Erasmus
Brigitte Bardot	Herself
Harry Fleer	Man at racetrack: "Treasury Department Bureau of Internal Revenue"

== Production ==
John Haase's novel Erasmus with Freckles was published in 1963. There was some talk that Disney would option the film rights and cast Bing Crosby in the lead role. However, rights were bought by 20th Century-Fox, which assigned the project to Nunnally Johnson, Henry Koster, and James Stewart, the team that made Mr. Hobbs Takes a Vacation and Take Her, She's Mine.

Johnson later said that he "hadn't wanted to do" the film. "I didn't think there was enough material in it, but I really allowed myself to be persuaded to do it. Jimmie would sign if I would write it, and Koster would get a job if Jimmie would sign. It all got around that, one depending on another. There was no material in there that justified a picture."

Although Johnson wrote early drafts of the film, Hal Kanter was brought in to work on it, and he received sole screen credit. Kanter says that it was Koster's idea to introduce a captain, played by Ed Wynn, to act as a Greek chorus. Johnson said that Koster got the idea from the film Tom Jones. Johnson did not like the device because he felt that it did not suit the picture, and he told Koster to get another writer to do it. He told Koster, "You'd better get a good gag man who does those one-line things. I don't do that, and I couldn't do it." Koster hired Kanter, so Johnson asked to take his name off the film. Johnson says that when he saw Stewart, "he told me he didn't know I'd taken my name off of it. He was unhappy about the picture too, but there was nothing to do by then."

Filming started April 1964. It was one of the first movies made at the recently re-opened 20th Century-Fox studios.

Billy Mumy was cast on the recommendation of James Stewart's wife Gloria Stewart, who taught a Sunday School class that Mumy attended.

Johnson later said, "Henry [Koster] was an old-fashioned fellow, and if it hadn't have been for the fact that Jimmie [sic] Stewart was the leading man in the pictures, he would have expired much earlier than he did. I'm afraid he's through now, you know. But I've seen him, and there's nothing sadder than these old directors who disappear and don't get jobs. In the old days, a fellow wrote a script, they hired a director. Now, quite often, unless they can get somebody like Willie Wyler or Billy Wilder or somebody like that, the writer directs it. This all goes to prove, to me anyway, that the old-time directors, were a real collection of frauds."

The film was the sixth straight acting role for Fabian since he quit singing. He had previously appeared in Mr. Hobbs Takes a Vacation. He had never been to the races before being cast, so he researched his role by going to the races and developing a betting system.

There was some doubt that Bardot would appear in the film, but she relented and her scenes were shot in three days in Paris.

== Reception ==
According to Fox records, the film needed to earn $4,500,000 in revenues to break even, but made $2,920,000, meaning it made a loss.

FilmInk described Bardot's appearance as "the highlight of an unfunny movie."

== See also ==
- List of American films of 1965
