= Strategy of Terror =

- Directed by: Jack Smight
- Written by: Robert L. Joseph
- Produced by: Arthur H. Nadel
- Starring: Hugh O'Brian; Barbara Rush; Neil Hamilton; Harry Townes
- Cinematography: Bud Thackery
- Edited by: Sam E. Waxman
- Music by: Lyn Murray
- Production company: Roncom Films
- Distributed by: Universal Pictures
- Release date: January 1, 1969
- Running time: 90 minutes
- Country: United States
- Language: English

Strategy of Terror is a 1969 American mystery film directed by Jack Smight, re-edited from a two-part 1965 Kraft Suspense Theatre episode, "In Darkness, Waiting".

== Premise ==
A reporter (Barbara Rush) uncovers a plan to assassinate four United Nations (UN) representatives by a right-wing extremist (Neil Hamilton), but no one will believe her, until one New York City cop (Hugh O'Brian teams up with her to uncover the conspiracy.

== Cast ==
- Hugh O'Brian as Matt Lacey
- Barbara Rush as Karen Lownes
- Neil Hamilton as Mr. Harkin
- Frederick O'Neal as Jacques Serac
- Will Corry as Wally Pit
- Mort Mills as Victor Pelling
- Harry Townes as Richard
- Jan Merlin as Jon

== Reception ==
A review by Hal Erickson at AllMovie.com notes that "Frederick O'Neal, a leading light of African American theatre, is superb as a loquacious African UN delegate", and that "Neil Hamilton, onetime silent screen star and future Commissioner Gordon on TV's Batman, is surprisingly sinister as a pompous right-wing fanatic".

== See also ==
- List of American films of 1969
