= Out of Darkness (1994 film) =

1994 American television film

- VHS cover
- Genre: Biography; Psychological drama
- Written by: Barbara Turner
- Directed by: Larry Elikann
- Starring: Diana Ross; Ann Weldon; Rhonda Stubbins White; Beah Richards; Carl Lumbly
- Music by: Michel Colombier
- Country of origin: United States
- Original language: English

Production
- Executive producers: Diana Ross; Andrew Adelson
- Producer: George W. Perkins
- Cinematography: Eric Van Haren Noman
- Editor: Peter V. White
- Running time: 100 minutes
- Production companies: Anaid Film Productions; Andrew Adelson Company

Original release
- Network: ABC
- Release: January 16, 1994

Out of Darkness is a 1994 American made-for-television biographical psychological drama film starring singer-actress Diana Ross. The movie was distributed and released by ABC on January 16, 1994, in the United States, Germany, Spain, France, Greece, Italy and Portugal.

== Plot ==
In the film, Ross's character, named Pauline Cooper, is a former medical student who becomes ill with paranoid schizophrenia and loses 18 years of her life due to the sickness. After her release from a mental ward, Pauline returns home to live with her mother and struggles to rebuild her life with help from doctors, nurses, and a new experimental medication that will help aid her back to health but refusing to set foot in the outside world.

A psychiatric worker, Lindsay Crouse who resolves to help Pauline face up to herself and what lies beyond the front door.

Throughout the movie, Pauline seeks to better herself in a world that she felt had shunned her.

The story is open-ended, concluding with Pauline seeing a homeless woman rummaging through junk cans and talking to herself, leaving Pauline in tears. The question of whether this will be Pauline's future or was a fate Pauline had avoided but to which she could still fall victim to was not answered, only raised.

== Cast ==
- Diana Ross as Pauline "Paulie" Cooper
- Ann Weldon as Virginia Cooper
- Rhonda Stubbins White as Zoe Price
- Beah Richards as Mrs. Cooper
- Carl Lumbly as Addison Haig
- Chasiti Hampton as Ashley Cooper
- Maura Tierney as Meg
- John Marshall Jones as Albert Price
- Rusty Gray as Bartender (credited as Rusty Schmidt for the film)
- Lindsay Crouse as Kim Donaldson
- Juanita Jennings as Inez
- Patricia Idlette as Policewoman

== Production ==
The film was rated PG-13 and rated M in Australia. The movie was made by several different production companies; these included Ross's Anaid Film Productions Inc., Andrew Delson Company, Capital Cities/ABC Video Enterprises Inc. and Empty Chair Productions Inc.

In an attempt to improvise the "walk" of a homeless indigent, Ross discreetly placed an orange between her skirted thighs and proceeded to hobble along on cue. The effort required to keep the concealed orange in place, and without using her hands, resulted in a gait so uncanny that Ross's director, Larry Elikann, later quizzed her about how she walked the "walk." But according to Ross herself, as she related to the audience of Inside the Actors Studio on February 19, 2006, she never did disclose the simplicity of her little ruse.

== Awards ==
Ross earned a Golden Globe nomination for Best Actress – Miniseries or Television Film at the 52nd Golden Globe Awards in 1995.
