= Hemingway & Gellhorn =

2012 television film directed by Philip Kaufman

- Official poster
- Genre: Biographical drama
- Written by: Jerry Stahl; Barbara Turner
- Directed by: Philip Kaufman
- Starring: Nicole Kidman; Clive Owen
- Music by: Javier Navarrete
- Country of origin: United States
- Original language: English

Production
- Executive producers: Peter Kaufman; Trish Hoffman; James Gandolfini; Alexandra Ryan; Barbara Turner
- Cinematography: Rogier Stoffers
- Editor: Walter Murch
- Running time: 154 minutes
- Production companies: HBO Films; Attaboy Films; Walrus & Associates
- Budget: $14 million

Original release
- Network: HBO
- Release: May 25, 2012

Hemingway & Gellhorn is a 2012 American biographical drama television film directed by Philip Kaufman and written by Jerry Stahl and Barbara Turner, about the lives of journalist Martha Gellhorn (Nicole Kidman) and her husband, writer Ernest Hemingway (Clive Owen). The film premiered at the 2012 Cannes Film Festival, and aired on HBO on May 28, 2012.

== Plot ==
In a 1936 chance encounter, Ernest Hemingway and Martha Gellhorn meet for the first time in a Key West bar in Florida.

They encounter one another a year later in Spain, where both are covering the Spanish Civil War, and staying in the same hotel. Initially, Gellhorn resists romantic advances made by the famous Hemingway, but during a bombing raid, the two find themselves trapped alone in the same room, and they are overcome by lust. They become lovers and stay in Spain until 1939. Hemingway collaborates with Joris Ivens to produce The Spanish Earth.

Living together, Hemingway works feverishly and credits her with having inspired him to write the novel For Whom the Bell Tolls (1940), and he dedicates the work to her.

Over time, however, Gellhorn becomes more prominent in her own right, leading to certain career jealousies between the two. Gellhorn leaves Hemingway to go to Finland to cover the Winter War by herself. When she returns in 1940 to the Lookout Farm in Havana, Hemingway tells her that he has divorced Pauline so that he and Gellhorn could be married.

The two marry and, together, travel to China to cover the bombing attacks by Japan. In China, they interview Chiang Kai-shek and his spouse. Gellhorn is horrified after visiting an opium den. Chiang Kai-shek is fighting the Chinese Communists and Japanese invaders. The two secretly visit Zhou Enlai. Gellhorn then covers D-Day in Normandy. She also reports on the Dachau and Auschwitz concentration camps. Hemingway covers World War II as well, getting into a car accident with his eventual fourth wife Mary. Gellhorn visits him while recovering, leading to a fight between the two that seals their demise.

Ultimately, in 1945, Gellhorn becomes the only one of Hemingway's four wives to ask him for a divorce. She continues her work as a journalist for several more decades, while Hemingway commits suicide in 1961.

== Cast ==
- Nicole Kidman as Martha Gellhorn
- Clive Owen as Ernest Hemingway
- David Strathairn as John Dos Passos
- Molly Parker as Pauline Pfeiffer
- Parker Posey as Mary Welsh Hemingway
- Saverio Guerra as Sidney Franklin
- Rodrigo Santoro as Paco Zarra (based on José Robles)
- Mark Pellegrino as Max Eastman
- Peter Coyote as Maxwell Perkins
- Lars Ulrich as Joris Ivens
- Robert Duvall as General Petrov
- Tony Shalhoub as Mikhail Koltsov
- Leonard Apeltsin as Russian Operative
- Jeffrey Jones as Charles Colebaugh
- Santiago Cabrera as Robert Capa
- Aitor Inarra as Felipe Leon
- Diane Baker as Mrs. Gellhorn
- Steven Wiig as Simo Häyhä
- Keone Young as Mr. Ma
- Joan Chen as Madame Chiang
- Malcolm Brownson as Orson Welles
- Ivonne Coll as Gypsy Crone
- Anthony Brandon Wong as Chou En-lai

== Production ==
Pat Jackson, the film's sound effects editor, said that the biggest challenge in doing sound for the film was "making the archival footage and the live-action footage shot locally appear seamless." Much of the film was shot in the San Francisco Bay Area, with the abandoned 16th Street station in Oakland standing in for the Hotel Florida.

The production participated in the San Francisco "Scene in San Francisco Incentive Program" administered by the San Francisco Film Commission.

== Reception ==
The film received mixed reviews with much praise going for Nicole Kidman's portrayal of Martha Gellhorn. Mark Rozeman of Paste commented "In terms of the acting, there's little room for complaint. At 45, Kidman remains a fetching and powerful screen presence. Here, she captures Gellhorn's idealistic, gung-ho leftism without making herself sound overly self-righteous" but was less positive about Clive Owen, stating "While Owen easily embodies Hemingway's extraordinary charisma (and certainly his legendary temper), his performance is often undermined by the British actor's inability to hold his American accent." Jeremy Heilman of MovieMartyr.com agreed with Roseman's opinions, stating "Kidman is strong here as Martha Gellhorn, using her exceptional figure and old-fashioned movie star glamour to full effect" and that Owen's performance was "inconsistent, goofy one moment and strongly seductive the next." Todd McCarthy of The Hollywood Reporter said, "Kidman is terrific in certain scenes and merely very good in others; there are a few too many moments of her traipsing around Spain, blond hair flying glamorously, not knowing quite what she's doing there. But for the most part, she rivets one's attention, lifting the entire enterprise by her presence. Odie Henderson, writing for RogerEbert.com, praised both actors' performances while lauding the film's throwback feeling of romance. "The actors are first-rate, down to the supporting roles...This is Kidman's best work in years, smart, brassy, funny, sexy, and tough. She brings her A-game because Owen's showier role must be legendary, a larger-than-life evocation of masculinity suited for the name Hemingway. Cinematographer Rogier Stoffers introduces Owen in a desaturated fishing sequence that culminates in an explosion of bright red blood. Owen's Hemingway grabs the bull by the horns, resisting cliché just barely enough to feel the breath of caricature on his neck. His Russian Roulette pissing contest with an uncredited, equally macho, and over-the-top Robert Duvall is a highlight of the film. Anyone with a romantic appreciation of the male gender will swoon at Owen's constantly revealed chest hair. Everyone else can worship, as Kaufman's camera does, at the altar of Kidman's lower body, with its "legs that start at her shoulders."

Mike Hale of The New York Times panned the film, characterizing it as "a disheartening misfire: a big, bland historical melodrama built on platitudes about honor and the writing life that crams in actual figures and incidents but does little to illuminate them, or to make us care about the romance at its center." In a similar vein, James Wolcott of Vanity Fair wrote that "none of the reviews quite prepared me for the unchained malady of Hemingway & Gellhorn." Of the director, he wrote, "It's as if Kaufman answered the call of wild and it turned out to be a loon." In The Huffington Post, Maureen Ryan described it as "a gigantic missed opportunity, a jaw-droppingly trying waste of time. Don't let the fancy names in the cast fool you: This is a stupid, stupid movie." Rotten Tomatoes gives the film a 49% score based on 49 reviews, with an average rating of 5.33/10.

=== Accolades ===
Year	Award	Category	Nominee(s)	Result	Ref.
2012	Online Film & Television Association Awards	Best Motion Picture or Miniseries	Hemingway & Gellhorn	Nominated	
2012	Online Film & Television Association Awards	Best Actress in a Motion Picture or Miniseries	Nicole Kidman	Nominated	
2012	Online Film & Television Association Awards	Best Supporting Actor in a Motion Picture or Miniseries	David Strathairn	Nominated	
2012	Online Film & Television Association Awards	Best Direction of a Motion Picture or Miniseries	Philip Kaufman	Nominated	
2012	Online Film & Television Association Awards	Best Cinematography in a Non-Series	Hemingway & Gellhorn	Nominated	
2012	Online Film & Television Association Awards	Best Costume Design in a Non-Series	Hemingway & Gellhorn	Nominated	
2012	Online Film & Television Association Awards	Best Makeup/Hairstyling in a Non-Series	Hemingway & Gellhorn	Nominated	
2012	Online Film & Television Association Awards	Best Production Design in a Non-Series	Hemingway & Gellhorn	Nominated	
2012	Online Film & Television Association Awards	Best Visual Effects in a Non-Series	Hemingway & Gellhorn	Nominated	
2012	Primetime Emmy Awards	Outstanding Miniseries or Movie	Peter Kaufman, Trish Hofmann, James Gandolfini, Alexandra E. Ryan, Barbara Turner, Nancy Sanders, and Mark Armstrong	Nominated	
2012	Primetime Emmy Awards	Outstanding Lead Actor in a Miniseries or a Movie	Clive Owen	Nominated	
2012	Primetime Emmy Awards	Outstanding Lead Actress in a Miniseries or a Movie	Nicole Kidman	Nominated	
2012	Primetime Emmy Awards	Outstanding Supporting Actor in a Miniseries or a Movie	David Strathairn	Nominated	
2012	Primetime Emmy Awards	Outstanding Directing for a Miniseries, Movie or a Dramatic Special	Philip Kaufman	Nominated	
2012	Primetime Creative Arts Emmy Awards	Outstanding Art Direction for a Miniseries or Movie	Geoffrey Kirkland, Nanci Noblett, and Jim Erickson	Nominated	
2012	Primetime Creative Arts Emmy Awards	Outstanding Cinematography for a Miniseries or Movie	Rogier Stoffers	Nominated	
2012	Primetime Creative Arts Emmy Awards	Outstanding Costumes for a Miniseries, Movie or a Special	Ruth Myers and Adina Bucur	Nominated	
2012	Primetime Creative Arts Emmy Awards	Outstanding Hairstyling for a Miniseries or a Movie	Yvette Rivas and Frances Mathias	Nominated	
2012	Primetime Creative Arts Emmy Awards	Outstanding Makeup for a Miniseries or a Movie (Non-Prosthetic)	Gretchen Davis, Kyra Panchenko, and Paul Pattison	Nominated	
2012	Primetime Creative Arts Emmy Awards	Outstanding Music Composition for a Miniseries, Movie or a Special (Original Dramatic Score)	Javier Navarrete	Won	
2012	Primetime Creative Arts Emmy Awards	Outstanding Single-Camera Picture Editing for a Miniseries or a Movie	Walter Murch	Nominated	
2012	Primetime Creative Arts Emmy Awards	Outstanding Sound Editing for a Miniseries, Movie or a Special	Douglas Murray, Peter Horner, Kim Foscato, Steve Boeddeker, Casey Langfelder, Andrea Gard, Pat Jackson, Daniel Laurie, Goro Koyama, Andy Malcolm, and Joanie Diener	Won	
2012	Primetime Creative Arts Emmy Awards	Outstanding Sound Mixing for a Miniseries or a Movie	Nelson Stoll, Lora Hirschberg, Peter Horner, and Douglas Murray	Nominated	
2012	Primetime Creative Arts Emmy Awards	Outstanding Special Visual Effects in a Supporting Role	Chris Morley, Kip Larsen, Nathan Abbot, and Chris Paizis	Nominated	
2012	Satellite Awards	Miniseries or Motion Picture Made for Television	Hemingway & Gellhorn	Nominated	
2012	Satellite Awards	Best Actor in a Miniseries or a Motion Picture Made for Television	Clive Owen	Nominated	
2012	Satellite Awards	Best Actress in a Miniseries or a Motion Picture Made for Television	Nicole Kidman	Nominated	
2012	Television Critics Association Awards	Outstanding Achievement in Movies, Miniseries, and Specials	Hemingway & Gellhorn	Nominated	
2012	Women Film Critics Circle Awards	Best Theatrically Unreleased Movie by or About Women	Hemingway & Gellhorn	Won	
2012	Women's Image Network Awards	Actress Made for Television Movie	Nicole Kidman	Won	
2013	American Cinema Editors Awards	Best Edited Miniseries or Motion Picture for Television	Walter Murch	Won	
2013	American Society of Cinematographers Awards	Outstanding Achievement in Cinematography in Motion Picture/Miniseries	Rogier Stoffers	Nominated	
2013	Art Directors Guild Awards	Excellence in Production Design Award – Television Movie or Mini-Series	Geoffrey Kirkland, Nanci Noblett, William Beck, Gerard Howland, and Jim Erickson	Nominated	
2013	Cinema Audio Society Awards	Outstanding Achievement in Sound Mixing for Television Movies and Mini-Series	Nelson Stoll, Lora Hirschberg, Pete Horner, Douglas Murray, Marc Blanes Matas, Andy Greenberg, and Don White	Nominated	
2013	Costume Designers Guild Awards	Outstanding Made for Television Movie or Miniseries	Ruth Myers	Nominated	
2013	Directors Guild of America Awards	Outstanding Directorial Achievement in Movies for Television and Miniseries	Philip Kaufman	Nominated	
2013	Golden Globe Awards	Best Actor in a Miniseries or Television Film	Clive Owen	Nominated	
2013	Golden Globe Awards	Best Actress in a Miniseries or Television Film	Nicole Kidman	Nominated	
2013	Golden Reel Awards	Best Sound Editing – Long Form Music in Television	Joanie Diener	Won	
2013	Golden Reel Awards	Best Sound Editing – Long Form Sound Effects and Foley in Television	Douglas Murray, Pete Horner, Kim Foscato, Steve Boeddeker, Andrea Gard, Pat Jackson, Casey Langfelder, Goro Koyama, and Andy Malcolm	Nominated	
2013	Guild of Music Supervisors Awards	Best Music Supervision for Television Long Form and Movie	Evyen Klean	Nominated	
2013	Screen Actors Guild Awards	Outstanding Performance by a Male Actor in a Miniseries or Television Movie	Clive Owen	Nominated	
2013	Screen Actors Guild Awards	Outstanding Performance by a Female Actor in a Miniseries or Television Movie	Nicole Kidman	Nominated	
2013	Visual Effects Society Awards	Outstanding Supporting Visual Effects in a Broadcast Program	Nathan Abbot, Kip Larsen, Chris Morley, and Chris Paizis	Nominated	
2013	Visual Effects Society Awards	Outstanding Compositing in a Broadcast Program	Nathan Abbot, Shelley Campbell, Chris Morley, and Chris Paizis	Nominated	
2013	Writers Guild of America Awards	Long Form – Original	Jerry Stahl and Barbara Turner	Nominated	
