= Deathwatch (1965 film) =

1965 American film by Vic Morrow

- Directed by: Vic Morrow
- Written by: Bernard Frechtman (translation); Vic Morrow; Barbara Turner
- Based on: Haute Surveillance by Jean Genet
- Produced by: Vic Morrow; Leonard Nimoy
- Starring: Leonard Nimoy; Michael Forest; Paul Mazursky
- Cinematography: Vilis Lapenieks
- Edited by: Verna Fields
- Music by: Gerald Fried
- Production company: Deathwatch Company
- Distributed by: Altura Films International
- Release dates: 1965 (San Francisco International Film Festival); March 1966 (U.S.)
- Running time: 88 minutes
- Country: United States
- Language: English

Deathwatch is a 1965 American independent drama film directed by Vic Morrow. It is an adaptation of the 1949 French play Haute Surveillance by Jean Genet.

== Plot ==
Greeneyes and Snowball are both murderers in prison awaiting their death sentences to be carried out by guillotine. The jewel thief Lefranc and hoodlum Maurice, Greeneyes' cellmates, are imprisoned for less serious crimes but must align themselves with more brutal inmates for their survival in prison. They both seek to get closer to Greeneyes, leading to conflict.

Greeneyes is illiterate; he relies on Lefranc to read letters from his wife. Lefranc also writes replies to her aloud. Once his wife learns that Greeneyes wasn't the one writing to her, she loses interest in him. Greeneyes goes into a rage. He wants her dead, and he wants either of his cellmates to kill her once they are out of prison.

Greeneyes later breaks down. He laments that he is trapped in a "prison" of his thoughts and actions, unable to change the course of his life or turn himself around. He is taken away for a visit with his wife. While Greeneyes is gone, Maurice and Lefranc fight over who the better criminal is. Each thinks that he deserves Greeneyes' favoritism.

Once Greeneyes returns, he no longer wants his wife dead. Instead, he gives her away to a guard. The guard is friendly with Greeneyes and gives him contraband from Snowball, another powerful inmate. Lefranc becomes disillusioned with Greeneyes and with Snowball, realizing that they both work with the guards. However, he still wants Greeneyes' respect and power.

Maurice and Lefranc get into a fight; Lefranc's shirt rips, revealing a tattoo. He thinks he's gained Greeneyes' favoritism, but Maurice exposes the tattoo as a painted-on fake. Maurice starts to taunt Lefranc.

Lefranc attacks Maurice and strangles him to death. He expects Greeneyes to praise him for the murder. Instead, Greeneyes is disgusted and alerts the guards. Lefranc is left with the realization that he'll never be the kind of man Greeneyes is.

== Cast ==
- Leonard Nimoy as Lefranc
- Michael Forest as Greeneyes
- Paul Mazursky as Maurice
- Robert Ellenstein as guard
- Gavin MacLeod as Emil

== Production ==
Vic Morrow had played Lefranc in the first New York production of Deathwatch in 1958. The three actors Leonard Nimoy, Paul Mazursky, and Michael Forest had already staged a version of the play in 1959.

Vic Morrow announced he wanted to make the film back in December 1960. He said his dream cast would include Cornel Wilde, Dan Duryea, and George Hamilton.

The New York Times printed that Vic Morrow and Leonard Nimoy had acquired the movie rights to the play in the issue published November 27, 1962. Leonard Nimoy obtained the rights to film Haute Surveillance directly from Genet, though Genet had no further involvement with the project.

Morrow and his then-wife Barbara Turner adapted the screenplay. Part of Deathwatch was shot in the nineteenth-century Nevada State Prison, where the actors lived for six months to prepare for their roles. Some of the inmates took part in the production.

== Release ==
The film was first shown at the San Francisco International Film Festival in 1965 but was not given a general release nor widely reviewed. It was later given a limited release in the US in March 1966. One of the first films to be directly marketed to a gay audience, Deathwatch was quickly buried in the States and never released in the UK.

== Reception ==
In a review years later, a reviewer for the San Francisco Bay Guardian wrote that in "the feature, adapted from a Genet play, which has been unjustly forgotten for 23 years, Vic Morrow's direction captures a consistent, if not very interesting, mood and the editing seems ahead of its time in the way flashbacks are inserted. Leonard Nimoy and Michael Forest are the butch guys sharing a cell with Nellie Paul Mazursky in this unromantic triangle that's hard to tear your eyes away from, even if it's not very good."
