= Petulia =

1968 film by Richard Lester

- Theatrical release poster, artwork by Ted CoConis
- Directed by: Richard Lester
- Screenplay by: Lawrence B. Marcus
- Story by: Barbara Turner
- Based on: Me and the Arch Kook Petulia; 1966 novel by John Haase
- Produced by: Don Devlin; Denis O'Dell; Raymond Wagner
- Starring: Julie Christie; George C. Scott; Richard Chamberlain; Arthur Hill; Shirley Knight; Joseph Cotten
- Cinematography: Nicolas Roeg
- Edited by: Antony Gibbs
- Music by: John Barry
- Distributed by: Warner Bros.-Seven Arts
- Release date: 10 June 1968
- Running time: 105 minutes
- Countries: United States; United Kingdom
- Language: English
- Box office: $1.6 million (US/Canada)

Petulia is a 1968 romantic drama film directed by Richard Lester and starring Julie Christie, George C. Scott and Richard Chamberlain. The screenplay was by Lawrence B. Marcus from a story by Barbara Turner and is based on the 1966 novel Me and the Arch Kook Petulia by John Haase. It was scored by John Barry.

== Plot ==
In San Francisco, Petulia Danner is a young socialite who has been married to David, an architect, for six months. She meets Dr. Archie Bollen, who is divorcing his wife Polo, at a benefit concert for victims of traffic accidents. Petulia has grown romantically attached to Archie when he operated on Oliver, a Mexican boy she adopted. The two go upstairs inside the Hilton Hotel for a one-night stand, but Petulia reconsiders and Archie escorts her to a taxi. The next morning, Petulia impulsively arrives at Archie's apartment with a tuba.

Archie is nonchalant with Petulia and leaves for work. When he returns, Archie finds Petulia outside with the tuba. She boards a bus back home, and Archie unsuccessfully tries to return the tuba. The next day, Polo arrives at Archie's apartment and tells her soon-to-be ex-husband that she is remarrying, which angers him as he considered reconciling. During an afternoon picnic in the park, Archie is with his girlfriend May. Petulia stalks Archie when he arrives at May's apartment, and once more, when she is in his work office. Archie gives into Petulia's romantic pursuit and they spend the night together when she sleeps at his apartment.

After Archie tours Alcatraz Island with his children, he returns to find Petulia severely beaten. The ambulance arrives and while Petulia is hospitalized, Archie watches a Polaroid slide show of family photos with his coworker Barney and his wife Wilma. As Archie watches a roller derby with Polo and their father, David's father visits Petulia in recovery, and she is admitted out of hospital. Archie arrives at the Danners estate and blames David for assaulting Petulia but David states that he was out of town. His father corroborates his story, and Archie leaves angered when Petulia says nothing.

A year later, Archie reencounters Petulia on an afternoon trip with his son. When he returns to his apartment, he finds it has been retrofitted with an artificial greenhouse. Meanwhile, Petulia and David are on a sailboat cruise, though their marriage remains strained. When they return, Archie finds Petulia in a maternity ward. They reflect on their affair and Archie kisses her goodbye. Petulia is wheeled into the delivery room and calls for Archie.

== Cast ==
- Julie Christie as Petulia Danner
- George C. Scott as Dr. Archie Bollen
- Richard Chamberlain as David Danner
- Arthur Hill as Barney
- Shirley Knight as Prudence "Polo" Bollen
- Joseph Cotten as Mr. Danner
- Pippa Scott as May
- Kathleen Widdoes as Wilma
- Roger Bowen as Warren
- Richard Dysart as motel receptionist
- Ruth Kobart as nun
- Ellen Geer as nun
- Lou Gilbert as Mr. Howard
- Nate Esformes as Mr. Mendoza
- Maria Val as Mrs. Mendoza
- Vincent Arias as Oliver
- Eric Weiss as Michael
- Kevin Cooper as Stevie
- Rene Auberjonois as Fred Six (uncredited)
- Peter Bonerz (uncredited)
- Barbara Bosson (uncredited)
- Barbara Colby as patient (uncredited)
- Garry Goodrow (uncredited)
- Carl Gottlieb (uncredited)
- Howard Hesseman as hippie (uncredited)
- Kathryn Ish (uncredited)
- Austin Pendleton as intern (uncredited)
- Richard Stahl (uncredited)
- Mel Stewart (uncredited)

== Production ==
Producer Raymond Wagner originally developed the film with director Robert Altman, who brought on screenwriter Barbara Turner to adapt John Haase's novel. Turner's version was largely faithful to the novel – a romantic story told, as Kirkus Reviews put it, with "a light, trenchant wit." A March 7, 1966 article in Daily Variety reported that James Garner and Julie Christie were being considered for the lead roles, while later articles also mentioned that Paul Newman and Sean Connery were sought; out of these initial picks, only Christie actually appeared in the film.

However, Altman and Wagner then dissolved their partnership, and Wagner engaged Richard Lester as the new director of Petulia. As Lester's biographer Andrew Yule wrote, "Lester hated both the book and the script, especially the cuteness of its leading character. But there was something about it, perhaps the challenge of bringing its archness down to earth and injecting a healthy dose of reality." Lester brought on his frequent collaborator, screenwriter Charles Wood, for a page-one rewrite, then replaced Wood with Lawrence B. Marcus. As Lester told the San Francisco Examiner, "I don't see it as a comedy. Larry Marcus' screenplay has altered the novel considerably -- to a sad love story about two people who meet and turn each other into opposites." Both Haase and Turner reportedly hated the revised script, and the two briefly attempted to rescind the studio's option on the novel. At one point during filming, Haase had planned to visit the set but was barred by Lester, which led to the former penning a scathing account of the project's development, including the disputes over the script, for the Los Angeles Times.

The city's setting was changed from Los Angeles to San Francisco, with Lester stating that the latter lent a more "subtle" backdrop to the story. Petulia began filming on location on April 10, 1967, and lasted 11 weeks, with one more week of shooting in Tijuana, Mexico. The production was said to be the first major studio attempt to shoot a film entirely in San Francisco, with locations that included the Filbert Steps, the Embarcadero, the Presidio, Fort Scott, Tiburon, Sausalito, and Muir Woods. The movie included scenes at the apartment building located at 307 Filbert Street, the Cala Foods on Hyde, and the Fairmont Hotel ballroom. The rock band Jefferson Airplane was slated to appear, although it was ultimately replaced by the Grateful Dead and Big Brother and the Holding Company (featuring Janis Joplin), with scenes featuring both bands filmed from May 29–31. In addition to stars George C. Scott, Julie Christie, Richard Chamberlain, Shirley Knight, and Joseph Cotten, Lester included members of the comedy troupes The Committee and Ace Trucking Company.

This was Nicolas Roeg's last job as cinematographer before becoming a director. Critic Jonathan Rosenbaum points out that it was on Petulia "that Roeg can be said to have arrived at many of the rudiments of style and structure that characterize his own, subsequent films, the first of which was Performance. An essential part of this manner is a form of rapid and fragmented, kaleidoscopic cross-cutting between diverse strands in a narrative tapestry, an approach that creates meaning largely through unexpected juxtapositions. By and large, it is a wide-ranging, impressionistic method which can make a relatively simple plot multilayered and complex, and an already difficult plot a series of puzzles and mazes."

== Reception ==
Petulia had been listed to compete at the 1968 Cannes Film Festival, but the festival was cancelled due to the May 1968 protests and unrest in France. The initial theatrical release was in NYC on June 10, 1968, with a wider release after its Los Angeles premiere on August 20.

Critic Pauline Kael billed it as the "come-dressed-as-the-sick-soul-of-America-party." She goes on to attribute its commercial success to a "triumph of publicity" while acknowledging the film was polarizing. Even though Kael was not a fan of the film, she suggests that critics should still be impressed by it.

John Haase, the author of the source novel, loathed the movie, and wrote a scathing article for the Los Angeles Times about the book's journey to the screen, concluding, "The novel is gone. Barbara Turner's screenplay is gone. Altman is gone, Petulia is gone, Archie is gone. Only Ray Wagner is left, and Dick Lester and 350,000 feet of film, and miniskirts, and the Jefferson Airplane, and the Grateful Dead, and the topless restaurants, and the hippies, and the junkies and the go-go girls and the mod and the pop and the op and all the other sick and ugly things of our time the book never dealt with at all. That's what's left."

Lester was pleased with the film. As he told Steven Soderbergh years later: "I felt that I had plugged into what I wanted to say, and that a chance had been given me by odd circumstances: taking a book that seemed totally wrong and being angry about it, then trying to see what one could make of it and using that as a means of talking about fairly complicated things...a frazzled and disjointed response to a society that was in chaos and they didn't know how to deal with it."

The film was a box-office disappointment, earning just $1.6 million on a $3.5 million budget. Tobias Churton wrote in his book The Spiritual Meaning of the Sixties: "Petulia failed to strike a chord with the public. Its approach was too advanced, ambiguous, perhaps even too prophetic."

The Monthly Film Bulletin wrote: "Richard Lester's choice of San Francisco – possibly both the most picturesque and gimmick-ridden of American cities – as the setting for his "sad love story" is not simply a baroque piece of window dressing. His film is principally about people's inability to make contact with one another – whether attempting to do so from love, loneliness, hatred or compassion – and the touristic attractions of the swinging city, far from being merely decorative, are indications of the reasons for this failure ... The principal virtue of Petulia (Lester's first attempt at a serious, psychological drama) lies in the extent to which it 'convincingly portrays the impossibility of romantic ties in a glittering, swinging world. ...Petulia's dizzying jigsaw puzzle structure combines with Nicolas Roeg's attractive photography to create its: own bright universe, leaving one with the suspicion that the destruction of love and romance is due less to contemporary social pressures than to the fashion for fragmentary narrative techniques."

Giving the film four stars, Roger Ebert wrote in his Chicago Sun-Times review of 1 July 1968: "Richard Lester's Petulia made me desperately unhappy, and yet I am unable to find a single thing wrong with it." In The New York Times, Renata Adler called it "a strange, lovely, nervous little film." On the other side of the ledger, in her 1969 essay "Trash, Art, and the Movies," Pauline Kael wrote that "I have rarely seen a more disagreeable, a more dislikable (or a bloodier) movie than Petulia." Critic John Simon called the film "a soulless, arbitrary, attitudinizing piece of claptrap."

In time, however, Petulia developed a cult following, and many critics and writers came to see it as a key film of its era. Danny Peary devoted a chapter to the film in his 1981 book Cult Movies, describing it as "one of the best American films of the last fifteen years. Petulia is a brilliant film, inspiringly cast and beautifully acted, so rich in character and visual and aural detail that it takes several viewings to absorb it all. Lester makes the viewer work to grasp the meaning of his film." In How to Read a Film, James Monaco called Petulia "as prescient as it was sharply ironic – one of the two or three best American films of the period." Joel Siegel asserted that "Petulia is, without question, my favorite American movie, perhaps my favorite of all movies. I’ve seen it at least twice a year since it was released and each viewing has yielded fresh insights and pleasures."

Mark Bourne wrote in DVD Journal that "in 1978 a Take One magazine poll of 20 film critics — including Vincent Canby, Richard Corliss, Stanley Kauffmann, Janet Maslin, Frank Rich, Andrew Sarris, Richard Schickel, David Thomson and François Truffaut — ranked Petulia among the best American films of the previous decade, taking third place after The Godfather (I and II) and Nashville, and ahead of Annie Hall, Mean Streets and 2001."

== Awards and nominations ==
Award	Category	Nominee(s)	Result
Laurel Awards	Top Female Supporting Performance	Shirley Knight	Nominated
National Society of Film Critics Awards	Best Actor	George C. Scott	2nd Place (Note: Tied with Alan Arkin for The Heart Is a Lonely Hunter.)
New York Film Critics Circle Awards	Best Actor	George C. Scott	Nominated
Writers Guild of America Awards	Best Written American Drama	Lawrence B. Marcus	Nominated

== Music ==
Lester uses the current West Coast musicians of the time: Janis Joplin with Big Brother and the Holding Company playing "Roadblock" and the Grateful Dead playing "Viola Lee Blues", while The Committee, and Ace Trucking Company are briefly featured in club sequences. Grateful Dead members Jerry Garcia, Mickey Hart, Bob Weir, Phil Lesh, Ron "Pigpen" McKernan, and Bill Kreutzmann appear in cameos during the movie's apartment house medical emergency scene as onlookers. Jerry Garcia also appears in duplicate on a large mural and in triplicate on a bus bench both times in stylized solid black and white.

Petulia was an influence on filmmaker Steven Soderbergh.

The track "All Things to All Men" by The Cinematic Orchestra begins with a sample of John Barry's saxophone theme from the film.

== Home media ==
The film was released on VHS. A US DVD was released in 2006.
