= Mary Frann =

American actress (1943–1998)

- Frann in 1982
- Born: Mary Frances Luecke; February 27, 1943; St. Louis, Missouri, U.S.
- Died: September 23, 1998 (aged 55); Beverly Hills, California, U.S.
- Resting place: Holy Cross Cemetery
- Other names: Jennifer Douglas; Mary Fran
- Education: Northwestern University
- Occupation: Actress
- Years active: 1961–1998
- Known for: Newhart
- Spouse: T. J. Escott (m. 1973; div. 1983)
- Partner(s): Jonathan Cookman, Jr. (??–1998, her death)

Mary Frann (born Mary Frances Luecke, February 27, 1943 – September 23, 1998) was an American stage, film, and television actress.

She is most notable for her role as Joanna Loudon, the wife of Bob Newhart's character on the CBS sitcom Newhart, which aired from 1982 to 1990.

== Early years ==
Born in St. Louis, Frann was a child model and appeared in commercials for a local television station while she attended Nerinx Hall High School. At the age of 18, she was voted Missouri's "Junior Miss". She went on to win the 1961 national title of America's Junior Miss and earned a college scholarship to study drama at Northwestern University. As America's Junior Miss, she starred in a Jam Handy educational film (Prom: It's a Pleasure) extolling the etiquette and fun of the high school prom. While attending Northwestern, Frann worked as a weather reporter for the NBC station in St. Louis. After a year, she dropped out of Northwestern and moved to Chicago where she co-hosted a morning show on an ABC affiliate. While working as a host, Frann worked in local theatre productions and began working in television and films. In 1964, Frann made her television debut in the Kraft Suspense Theatre episode "Once Upon a Savage Night", which was subsequently expanded into the TV movie Nightmare in Chicago. In 1966, Frann made her feature film debut in the low-budget musical drama Nashville Rebel, starring Waylon Jennings.

== Career ==
After receiving an offer to host another morning show, Frann realized she wanted to pursue a career as an actress rather than a broadcaster. In 1968, she moved to Los Angeles where she stayed with her best friend, actress Joan Van Ark. Shortly after her arrival, Frann won a role on the NBC crime drama series My Friend Tony. After winning the role, Frann's agent told her that he felt she should change her name to something more appealing. Frann adopted the stage name "Jennifer Douglas", a name she picked from the phone book. After My Friend Tony was canceled after one season, Frann returned to using the name "Mary Frann" (which she had gone by since high school) as her professional name.

For the next five years, Frann continued to work in television and also worked in theatre in Los Angeles and New York. In 1974, she landed the role of Amanda Howard on the daytime soap opera Days of Our Lives. She would remain on the show until 1979. While on the series, Frann also made guest appearances on Quincy, M.E.; The Rockford Files; Fantasy Island; The Mary Tyler Moore Show and WKRP in Cincinnati. In 1978, Frann was nearly cast as Sue Ellen Ewing on the CBS primetime drama Dallas. Producers later decided to cast actress Linda Gray. In 1982, she starred on the short-lived series King's Crossing with Linda Hamilton. That series was canceled after one season due to low ratings. Later that year, she was cast as Joanna Loudon, the wife of Vermont inn owner Dick Loudon (Bob Newhart), in the sitcom Newhart. The series, which aired from October 1982 to May 1990, was a hit with audiences and was nominated for 25 Emmys and five Golden Globes. Shortly after filming the series finale, Frann was cast as "Clementine Duke" in the miniseries Lucky/Chances. The series was based on two of Jackie Collins' novels, Lucky and Chances. The role was a dramatic departure from Frann's work on Newhart and surprised audiences. She later told the Los Angeles Times, "I thought it would be outrageous, flamboyant, glamorous. I wanted to remind people that I was capable of playing many different roles."

During the run of Newhart, Frann continued acting in various projects. In 1985, she co-starred in the TV movie Gidget's Summer Reunion, and in 1988, she appeared in Dance 'til Dawn with Alyssa Milano, Christina Applegate and Kelsey Grammer. Frann also co-hosted the Miss USA and Miss Universe pageants of 1986 and 1987, and acted as hostess for the Macy's Thanksgiving Day Parade and the Rose Parade.

Her last acting role came in an episode of the series Beyond Belief: Fact or Fiction. Due to the sporadic airing of the series, the episode she was in, "The Curse of Hampton Manor", aired two years after her death.

== Personal life ==
Frann married T. J. Escott in 1973. They separated in 1982 and divorced the following year.

Frann was active as a volunteer fundraiser and worked with several charities. She was a member of the Celebrity Action Council, a volunteer group of celebrity women who served the women's outreach of the Los Angeles Mission, for seven years. The night before her death, she had attended a meeting at the Mission.

== Death ==
On September 23, 1998, Frann died in her sleep at her home in Beverly Hills. Her body was discovered by longtime boyfriend Jonathan Cookman, Jr. An autopsy determined she died of a heart attack, and found myocardial scars suggesting earlier undiagnosed infarction. Her remains are interred in the Holy Cross Cemetery in Culver City, California.

== Selected filmography ==
Film
Year	Title	Role	Notes
1961	The Prom: It's a Pleasure!	Mary Moore, Junior Miss Missouri	short film Uncredited
1966	Nashville Rebel	Molly Morgan	
1976	Woman in the Rain		Alternative title: A Hell Black Night
1990	Fatal Charm	Susan	Direct-to-video

Television
Year	Title	Role	Notes
1964	Kraft Suspense Theatre	Annette	Episode: "Once Upon a Savage Night"
1968	Get Smart	Stewardess	Episode: "Snoopy Smart vs. the Red Baron"; Credited as Jennifer Douglas
1968	That Girl	Pat Crawford	Episode: "Ann vs. Secretary"; Credited as Jennifer Douglas
1968–69	The Wild Wild West	Dr. Virginia Mays; Princess Lina	2 episodes Credited as Jennifer Douglas
1969	My Friend Tony		Main cast credited as Jennifer Douglas
1969	Bonanza	Barbara Parker	Episode: "The Running Man"; Credited as Jennifer Douglas
1969	Lancer	Dorrie	Episode: "The Kid"; Credited as Jennifer Douglas
1971	The Bill Cosby Show	Louise	Episode: "The Miraculous Martin"
1972	The Mary Tyler Moore Show	Joanne	Episode: "Some of My Best Friends Are Rhoda"
1972	Hawaii Five-O	Jean Holland	Episode: "Chain of Events"
1972	Search	Stephanie Burnside	Episode: "Operation Iceman"
1973	Cannon	Janice Rogers	Episode: "Murder for Murder"
1973–74	Return to Peyton Place	D. B. Bentley	Unknown episodes
1974	Firehouse		Episode: "Tide of Terror"
1974	The F.B.I.	Agent Pat Driscoll	Episode: "Confessions of a Madman"
1974	Apple's Way	Claudine Delacorte	Episode: "The Circus"
1974–79	Days of Our Lives	Amanda Howard	Unknown episodes
1975	The Wide World of Mystery	Jane Woodward	Episode: "Distant Early Warning"
1975–78	The Rockford Files	Valerie Thomas/Maria Heller; Ruth Beetson-White	2 episodes
1976	The TVTV Show	Mary Kay	Television special
1977	The Fantastic Journey	Roxanne	Episode: "Funhouse"
1977	Quincy, M.E.	Christine Hopwood	Episode: "No Deadly Secret"
1978	Fantasy Island	Grace Arnold	Episode: "Family Reunion/Voodoo"
1978	The Incredible Hulk	Karen Weiss	Episode: "Stop the Presses"
1978	The Rockford Files	Ruth Beetson-White	Episode: "A Fast Count"
1980	Stone	Adelle Lovins	Episode: "The Man in the Full Toledo"
1980	Portrait of an Escort	Sandy	TV movie
1981	Nero Wolfe	Janet Eaton	Episode: "Wolfe at the Door"
1981	WKRP in Cincinnati	Avis Dropkin	2 episodes
1981	Darkroom	Linda Beckwith	Episode: "Closed Circuit"
1982	King's Crossing	Nan Hollister	Main cast
1982–90	Newhart	Joanna Loudon	Main cast
1984–85	Hotel	Stephanie; Dr. Ellen Graham	2 episodes
1985	Gidget's Summer Reunion	Anne Bedford	TV movie
1987	The New Mike Hammer	Harriet "Harry" Quail	Episode: "A Face in the Night"
1987	Eight Is Enough: A Family Reunion	Abby Bradford	TV movie
1988	Dance 'til Dawn	Nancy Johnson	TV movie
1989	Single Women, Married Men	Pat Michaels	TV movie
1990	I'm Dangerous Tonight	Martha	TV movie
1990	CBS Comedy Bloopers	Host	Television special
1990	Lucky/Chances	Clementine Duke	Miniseries
1991	The Hitchhiker	Veronica	Episode: "Secrets"
1994	Burke's Law	Brittany Moore	Episode: "Who Killed Good Time Charlie?"
1997	Lois & Clark: The New Adventures of Superman	Alice White	Episode: "Toy Story"
1998	Diagnosis: Murder	Lucy Caruso	Episode: "Talked to Death"
2000	Beyond Belief: Fact or Fiction	Bev Conklin	Episode: "The Curse of Hampton Manor"; Aired posthumously
