= Harry Townes =

American actor (1914–2001)

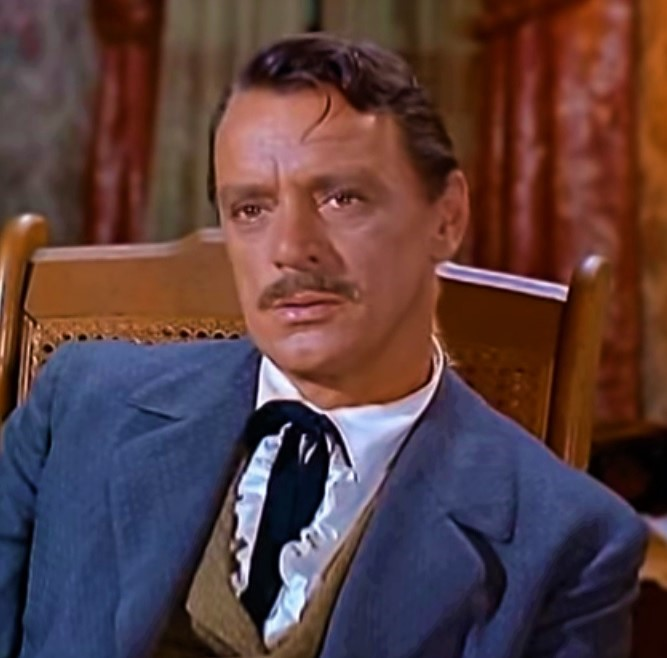
- Townes performing on the television series Bonanza in "The Mill", 1960
- Born: Harry Rhett Townes; September 18, 1914; Huntsville, Alabama, U.S.
- Died: May 23, 2001 (aged 86); Huntsville, Alabama, U.S.
- Resting place: Maple Hill Cemetery
- Education: University of Alabama; Columbia University
- Occupations: Actor, Episcopal priest
- Years active: 1949–1988

Harry Rhett Townes (September 18, 1914 – May 23, 2001) was an American actor who later became an Episcopalian minister.

== Early life ==
Harry Townes was born in Huntsville, Alabama, the son of Charles, a merchant, and Jeanne Townes. He had a sister and two brothers, one of whom died in childhood. He graduated from Huntsville High School, and while attending the University of Alabama in Tuscaloosa, began landing acting roles. Upon graduation, he moved to New York City to study acting at Columbia University.

== Career ==
Townes performed in several New York and Broadway stage productions, including summer stock. His Broadway credits include In the Matter of J. Robert Oppenheimer (1968), Gramercy Ghost (1950), Twelfth Night (1949), Mr. Sycamore (1942), and Tobacco Road (1942).

During World War II, he served three years in the United States Army. Discharged in 1946, he enrolled at Columbia University to study drama.

As a character actor, Townes was a familiar face to television viewers in the 1950s and 1960s. His expanded range led him to fill a variety of roles, and he avoided being typecast. He made five guest appearances on Perry Mason, including the role of title character Newton Bain in the 1964 episode, "The Case of the Woeful Widower." He also made three appearances on Bonanza, seven on Gunsmoke, and five on The Fugitive. He made single and double appearances on numerous other television series, including in Star Trek: The Original Series. Besides appearing in 29 films, he is credited with more than 200 television roles. He gained a cult following with a younger audience for a guest shot on "The First", a two-part episode of The Incredible Hulk, in which he portrays Dell Frye, a man with the ability to also transform into a Hulk-like creature. "The First" is one of the more popular episodes from the television series largely because of Townes' performance.

== Later years and death ==
While he was acting, Townes took philosophy classes at UCLA and studied for the ministry at Bishop Bloy School of Theology in Los Angeles. His ordination as a deacon came in 1973 at St. Paul's Cathedral in Los Angeles. He was ordained as an Episcopal minister in St. Paul's Cathedral on March 16, 1974. He served at St. Mary of the Angels Church in Hollywood. He retired from acting in 1989 and returned to his hometown of Huntsville, where he lived the remainder of his life.

On May 23, 2001, Townes died at home, in Huntsville at the age of 86, and his body was interred at Maple Hill Cemetery, also in Huntsville.

== Selected filmography ==
- Westinghouse Studio One (1952, TV Series)
- Tales of Tomorrow (1952, TV Series, episode "Youth on Tap")
- The Web (1953-1954, TV Series)
- Operation Manhunt (1954) - Igor Gouzenko
- Justice (1954, TV Series)
- The Mountain (1956) - Joseph
- Alfred Hitchcock Presents (TV Series)
  - Season 1 Episode 38: "The Creeper" - Ed (1956)
  - Season 2 Episode 17: "My Brother, Richard" - Richard Ross (1957)
- Father Knows Best - episode "Class Prophecy" (1957, TV Series) - Henry Pruett
- Have Gun - Will Travel (1958, TV Series) - Henry Prince
- The Brothers Karamazov (1958) - Ippoli Kirillov
- Screaming Mimi (1958) - Dr. Greenwood / Bill Green
- Cry Tough (1959) - Carlos Mendoza Lewis
- The Troubleshooters (1959, TV Series) - Verne Lewis
- Men Into Space (1959, TV Series) - Dr. William Thyssen
- Destination Space (1959, TV Movie) - Jim Benedict
- The Rebel (1960, TV Series) - Confederate Colonel Charles Morris
- Wanted: Dead or Alive - Season 2, Episode 17 "Mental Lapse"
- Laramie (1960, TV Series) - Mace Stringer
- Johnny Ringo (1960, TV Series) - Judge Mark Bentley
- One Step Beyond - Volume #4 (1959-1960, TV Series) - Gerald Simms / Dr. Alexander Slawson
- The DuPont Show with June Allyson (1959-1960, TV Series) - Rudolph Miller / Falk
- Stagecoach West (1960, TV Series) - Toby Reese
- The Islanders (1961, TV Series) - Hans Lubeck
- Sanctuary (1961) - Ira Bobbitt
- The Great Impostor (1961) - Ben Stone (uncredited)
- The Law and Mr. Jones (1961, TV Series) - Fowler / Jim Chambers
- The Twilight Zone (1960-1961, TV Series) - Henry Ritchie / Arch Hammer
- Thriller (1960-1961, TV Series) - Mario Asparos / Radan Asparos / Sebastian Grimm
- The Investigators (1961, TV Series) - Charles Victor, episode "In a Mirror, Darkly"
- Target: The Corruptors! (1961, TV Series) - Joe Knight
- Ripcord (1961, TV Series) - Dr. Gustave Merrill
- Outlaws (1960–1962, TV Series) - George Wagner / Jerry Rome / Thomas Bigelow
- The Tall Man (1962, TV Series) - Henry Stewart
- The Eleventh Hour (1963, TV Series) - Harvey Lauderback
- The Dakotas (1963, TV Series) - George Deus
- The Littlest Hobo (1963, TV Series) - Herman Eckels - Bank Teller
- The Outer Limits (1963, TV Series, episode: "O.B.I.T.") - Dr. Clifford Scott
- Rawhide (1959–1964, TV Series)
  - Rawhide (1959) – Amos Stauffer in S1:E9, "Incident of the Town in Terror"
  - Rawhide (1961) – Lewis Lewis in S3:E29, "Incident of the Night on the Town"
  - Rawhide (1964) – Captain Jesse Coulter in S6:E29, "Incident at Seven Fingers"
  - Rawhide (1964) – Brock Dillman in S7:E4, "The Lost Herd"
- The Alfred Hitchcock Hour (1963, 1965) (TV Series)
  - (Season 2 Episode 2: "A Nice Touch") (1963) - Ed Brandt
  - (Season 3 Episode 21: "The Photographer and the Undertaker") (1965) - Hiram Price
- Kentucky Jones (1965, TV Series, episode: "The Big Shot") - Charles Caldwell
- Mr. Novak (1964-1965, TV Series) - Walter MacTell / Frank Dever
- Perry Mason (1958–1966, TV Series) - Erwin Brandt / Colonel Owens / Newton Bain / Assistant District Attorney Grosvenor Cutter / Robert Fleetwood
- Dr. Kildare (1965–1966, TV Series) - Gerald Prince / Jake McCoy
- The Fugitive (1963-1966, TV Series) - Joshua Simmons / Deputy Russ Atkins / Ballinger / Art Mallet / Sergeant Burden
- The Monroes (1966, TV Series) - Joe Smith
- The Wild Wild West (1965–1967, TV Series) - Dr. Raven / Penrose
- Disneyland (1967, TV Series) - Mr. Barlow
- Star Trek (1967, TV Series, episode: "The Return of the Archons") - Reger
- The Invaders (1967, TV Series, episode: "Valley of the Shadow") - Will Hale
- Tarzan (1967) (TV Series)
  - (Season 2 Episode 11: "Mountains of the Moon") (1967) - Capt. Bates
  - (Season 2 Episode 12: "Mountains of the Moon") (1967) - Capt. Bates
- Fitzwilly (1967) - Mr. Nowell
- In Enemy Country (1968) - General Marchois
- The Big Valley (1968, TV Series) - Warren Masters
- The Mod Squad (1968, TV Series) - Jason
- Strategy of Terror (1969) - Richard
- Heaven with a Gun (1969) - Gus Sampson
- Bonanza (1960-1969, TV Series) - Seth Nagel / Judge David Terry / Tom Edwards
- The Hawaiians (1970) - Houghton
- Gunsmoke (1956–1971, TV Series) - Hale Parker / Malachi Harper / Abihu Howell / Tobe Hostater / Pezzy / Ivy / Bill Lee
- Mannix (1970-1972, TV Series) - Wilkerson / Martin Kimbrough
- Kung Fu (1973, TV Series, playing the same type role he played in the 1969 Bonanza episode, that of an American Civil War Rebel soldier, who, after the war, is still filled with hurt and resentment about the loss to the North) - Amos Buchanan
- Emergency! (1973, TV Series) - Barney Olsen
- Santee (1973) - Sheriff Carter
- Planet of the Apes (1974, TV Series) - Dr. Malthus
- Cannon (1975, TV Series, episode: "Nightmare") - Steve (Cannon's father-in-law)
- Sara (1976, TV Series) - Doc Vaughn
- Ark II (1976, TV Series, a story and role very similar to those of his Star Trek appearance) - Marcus
- Buck Rogers in the 25th Century (1981, TV Series) - The Guardian
- The Incredible Hulk (1981, TV Series) - Dell Frye
- Falcon Crest (1981–82, TV Series) - Jason Gioberti
- Angel of H.E.A.T. (1983) - Peter Shockley
- Voyagers! (1983, TV Series) - Professor Garth
- The Warrior and the Sorceress (1984) - Bludge the Prelate
- Magnum, P.I. (1984, TV Series) - Albert Leonard
- The Check Is in the Mail... (1986) - Fred Steinkrause
