= John Haase (author) =

American writer (1923–2006)

Dr. John Haase (August 21, 1923 – August 3, 2006) was an American dentist and author whose most well-known novel was adapted into the 1968 Richard Lester film Petulia starring George C. Scott and Julie Christie.

== Haase as author ==
His first novel, The Young Who Sin, appeared in 1958.

Erasmus with Freckles (1963) features Erasmus Leaf, who nurses a crush for Brigitte Bardot, and his father, an absent-minded poet with a distaste for science, who has to deal with the mathematical genius that his son demonstrates.

Me and the Arch Kook Petulia (1966) takes a satirical look at the America of the 1960s. It is the story of an affair between a middle-aged doctor in the midst of a divorce and a self-described kook who wants to have an affair because she has been married for six months and has not had one yet. Haase was not happy with the adaptation for screen, however the release of Lester's film was greeted with acclaim.

Big Red (1980), a historical novel, describes the construction of the Hoover Dam in the early 1930s. The title refers to the Colorado River, but the appellation is not well recognized among locales. Haase had in mind, from personal chats, to produce a book that could be compared to Steinbeck's Grapes of Wrath; unfortunately, the novel was not well received. Much of its local geography is based upon the research of a geographer, who engaged in fieldwork in Haase's behalf.

== Bibliography ==
- The Young Who Sin (1958)
- Road Show (1960)
- The Fun Couple (1961, made into a play of the same name)
- The Sherbert Colours (1963)
- Erasmus with Freckles (1963; made into the film Dear Brigitte, 1965)
- Me and the Arch Kook Petulia (1966; made into the film Petulia, 1968)
- The Noon Balloon to Rangoon (1967)
- The Nuptials (1969)
- Seasons and Moments (1971)
- Big Red (1980)
- San Francisco (1983)
- "A Boy's Rite of Passage Out of Nazi Germany" (article in the Los Angeles Times, 1984)
