= Deathwatch (play) =

1947 play written by Jean Genet

Deathwatch (French: Haute Surveillance) is a play written by Jean Genet, performed for the first time in Paris at the Théâtre des Mathurins in February 1949, directed by Genet.

== Plot ==
Three prisoners are locked up in the same cell. Green-Eyes (Yeux-Verts) has killed a woman and is to be guillotined. Maurice and Lefranc are sentenced for more minor crimes. Maurice has a deep attachment to Green-Eyes, as does Lefranc, but secretly. He also hates Maurice, while feigning to hate Green-Eyes, preferring him to Snowball (Boule-de-Neige). Snowball himself is also condemned to death (his presence in the play is only evoked, not actual) and along with Green-Eyes they are considered the kings of the prison. In fact their sentence traps them in a solitude and an immense unhappiness which lends them a certain dignity. Lefranc, who is constantly in conflict with Maurice (especially because of Green-Eyes's woman whom both of them desire), ends up strangling him in order to join Green-Eyes in his solitude and dejection.

== Film adaptation ==
The film was adapted into a 1965 film directed by Vic Morrow and starring Leonard Nimoy, Paul Mazursky, and Michael Forest, all four of whom had performed in earlier stage versions of the play in the 1950s.
