= Robert Ellenstein =

American actor (1923–2010)

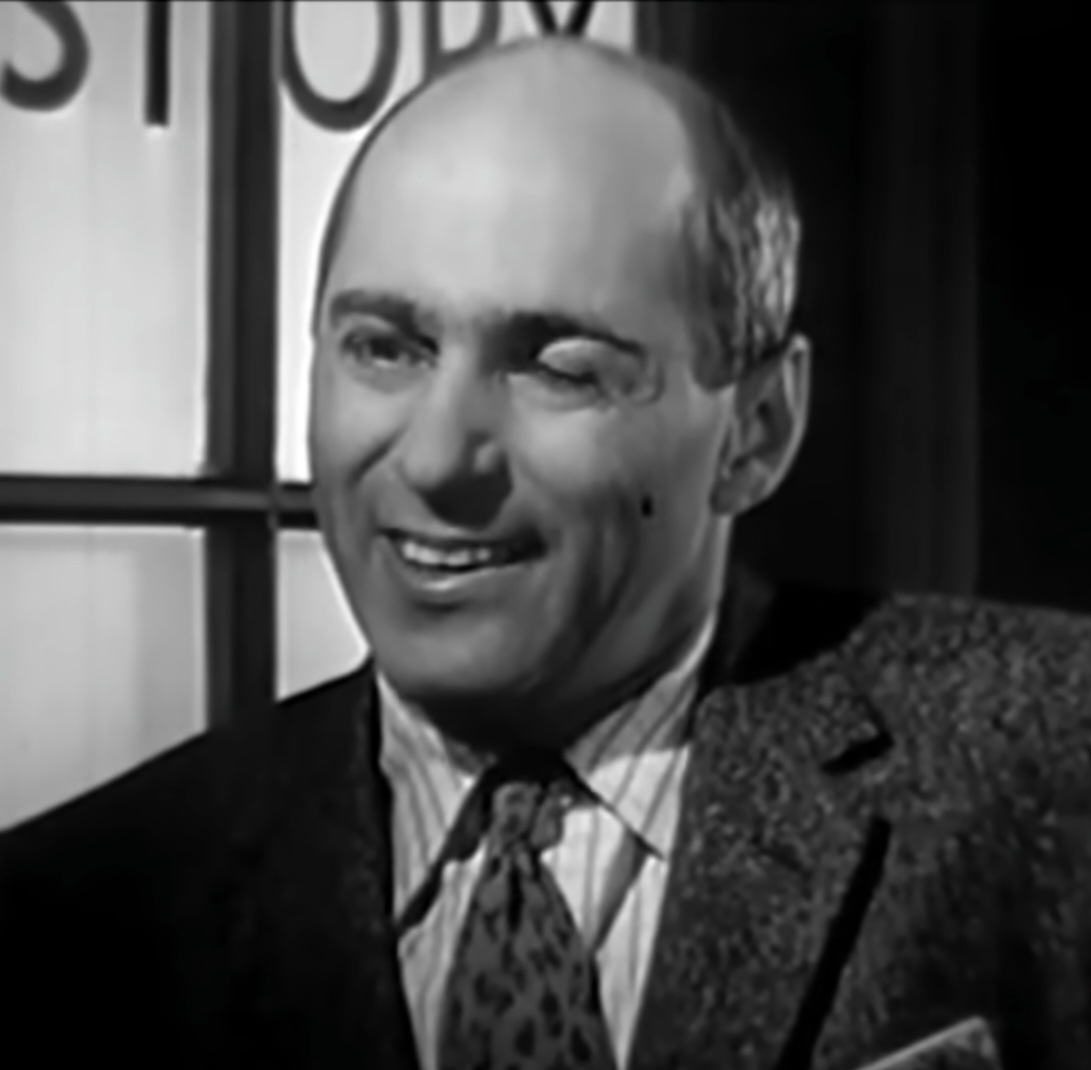
- Ellenstein in the One Step Beyond episode "Message from Clara", 1959
- Born: June 18, 1923; Newark, New Jersey, U.S.
- Died: October 28, 2010 (aged 87); Los Angeles, California, U.S.
- Other name: Bob Ellenstein
- Education: University of Iowa
- Occupations: Actor, director
- Years active: 1954–1998
- Spouse: Lois Sylvia Stang (m. 1952–2010) (his death)

Robert Ellenstein (June 18, 1923 – October 28, 2010) was an American actor. The son of Meyer C. Ellenstein, a Newark dentist, Ellenstein grew up to see his father become a two-term mayor from 1933 to 1941. He served in the United States Army Air Forces during World War II, earning a Purple Heart during his service.

== Early years ==
Ellenstein's parents were Meyer C. Ellenstein and Hilda Ellenstein. After attending New York University he graduated with a degree in theater from the University of Iowa in 1947. His interest in acting began while he was a prep school student at Mercersburg Academy, and after his university years he studied theater in New York with Stella Adler.

== Film and television career ==
A veteran of the "Golden Age" of live television (he played Quasimodo in a live Robert Montgomery Presents (1950) version of "The Hunchback of Notre Dame"), for the same show played the lead in "A Case of Identity", later turned into the film The Wrong Man (1956), he was the first actor to play Albert Einstein on television. Ellenstein made his first film in 1954 (MGM's Rogue Cop). He was featured in Alfred Hitchcock's North by Northwest. In 1961, he played the mobster Legs Diamond in an episode of NBC's 1920s crime drama The Lawless Years with James Gregory.

Among his television appearances, Ellenstein guest starred in three episodes of Perry Mason. In 1957 he played defendant John Addison in "The Case of the Vagabond Vixen." In 1959 he played murder victim Arthur Cartright in "The Case of the Howling Dog," and in 1960 he played Medical Examiner Dr. McBride in "The Case of the Madcap Modiste." In 1965 he played a character curiously of 65 years of age (in obviously inadequate makeup) in a second-season episode of The Man From U.N.C.L.E. He appeared in two episodes of the WWII drama, Combat!, first in 1965 in "The Tree of Moray" and in 1966 he was in the episode "Counterplay". He also made three guest appearances on The Untouchables, five appearances on The Wild Wild West, four on Ironside, and five on Mission: Impossible. He also directed television with an episode of the 1960s sitcom, Love on a Rooftop, and many live television episodes.

Ellenstein had over 200 television appearances.

== Stage ==
Ellenstein's career began on stage in 1947 at the Cleveland Play House. He performed hundreds of stage roles as an actor. He directed many theatre productions in New York, Los Angeles and in regional theater. He was artistic director of The Company of Angels and Founding Artistic Director of the Los Angeles Repertory Company. He co-starred in a national tour of Irma La Douce in the 1960s.

== Personal life and death ==
Ellenstein was married and had two sons and a daughter. He died in Los Angeles of natural causes on October 28, 2010, at age 87.

== Partial filmography ==
Year	Title	Role	Notes
1954	Rogue Cop	Det. Sidney Y. Myers	
1955	Illegal	Joe Knight	
1956	Gunsmoke	Tewksbury	Episode: "Prairie Happy"
1957	The Garment Jungle	Fred Kenner	
1957	3:10 to Yuma	Ernie Collins	
1957	The Walter Winchell File	Melk	Episode: "Where Is Louise Melk?"
1958	The Young Lions	Rabbi Joseph Silverstein	Uncredited
1958	Too Much, Too Soon	Gerald Frank	
1959	One Step Beyond	Captain Peabody	Episode: "The Navigator"
1959	One Step Beyond	Mr. Tomachek	Episode: "Message from Clara"
1959	North by Northwest	Licht	
1959	The Gazebo	Ben	
1960	Pay or Die	Luigi Di Sarno	
1961	The Big Bankroll	Lenny	
1965	Deathwatch	Guard	
1965	The Wild Wild West	Luis Vasquez	Episode: "The Night of the Flaming Ghost"
1966	Get Smart	Alex	Episode: "Double Agent"
1966	Bonanza	Harry Fitts	Episode: "The Code"
1968	The Wild Wild West	Dr. Occularis Second	Episodes: "The Night of the Winged Terror – Parts I & II"
1968	The Legend of Lylah Clare	Mike	
1969	The Big Valley	Dr. Amos Pearce	Episode: "Top of the Stairs"
1972	Mission: Impossible	Vincent Vochek	Episode: "Stone Pillow"
1978	Hawaii Five-O	Bart Warren	Episode: "Death Mask"
1979	Love at First Bite	VW Man	
1981	Magnum, P.I.	Saul Greenberg	Episode: "Never Again...Never Again"
1985	Brewster's Millions	Mr. Carter	
1986	Star Trek IV: The Voyage Home	Federation Council President	
1987	Star Trek: The Next Generation	Steven Miller	Episode: "Haven"
1989	L.A. Law	Dr. Peter Lacker	Episode: "I'm in the Nude for Love" (uncredited)
