= Connie Clausen =

American actress, author, and literary agent (1923–1997)

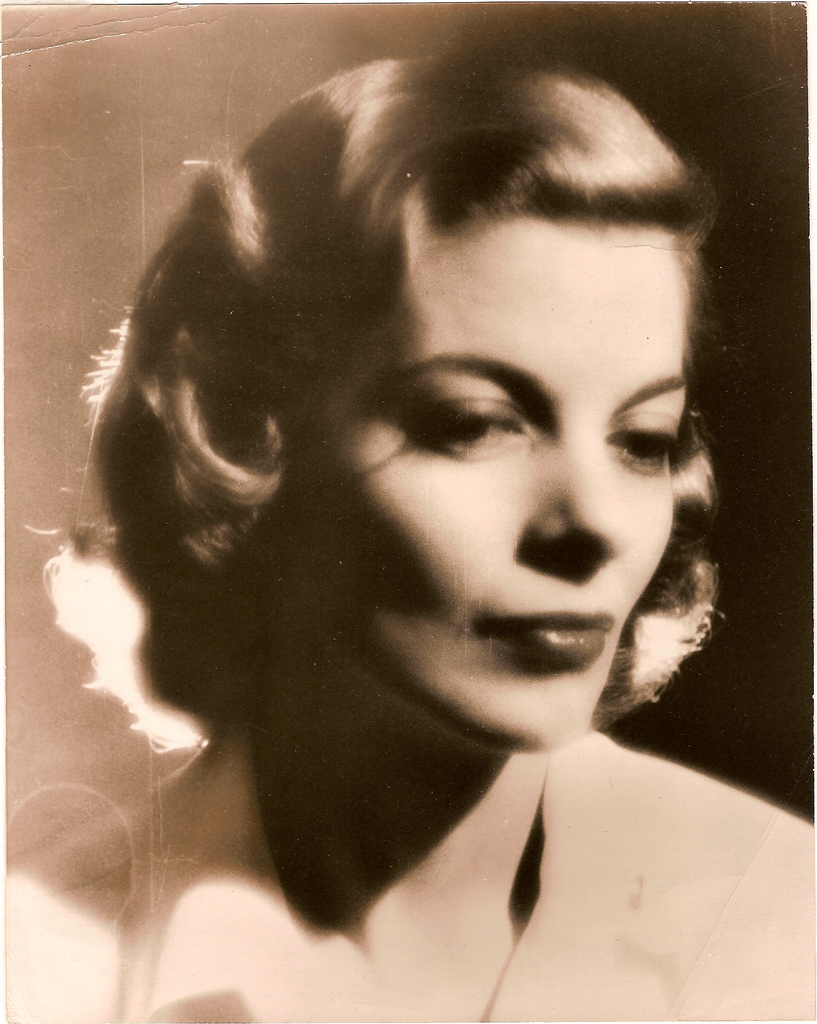
- Born: June 11, 1923; Menasha, Wisconsin, U.S.
- Died: September 7, 1997 (aged 74); New York City, U.S.
- Occupations: Actress, spokesperson, author

Connie Clausen (born Constance Clausen on June 11, 1923, in Menasha, Wisconsin, and died September 7, 1997, in New York City) was an American actress, author, and literary agent.

== Career ==
Connie Clausen's career began in 1942 at the age of 19 when she was approached by John Ringling North on Main Street in Sarasota, Florida (then the winter quarters for Ringling Brothers Circus), who told her that her long hair would make her a perfect Alice in the following season's "fairy tale"-themed grand finale. She joined the Ringling Bros. and Barnum & Bailey Circus and performed as an acrobat in an elephant act. Her experiences in the circus later provided material for her memoir I Love You Honey, but the Season's Over (Holt, Rinehart & Winston, 1961), in which she discussed, among other issues, the "significant gap" between what women did within the circus ring and their treatment outside of it.

After leaving the circus, she worked as a magazine and television writer and started with MGM Studios in Hollywood as director of special promotions. Encouraged by an MGM studio photographer, she moved to New York City to begin a career as a Conover Model and as a successful Broadway and television actress. She appeared on Broadway in The Gambler with Alfred Drake and appeared in television shows and commercials in the 1950s and 1960s. She was a television spokeswoman for Beech-Nut and Westinghouse Electric Corporation.

In 1971 Connie Clausen began a new career in publishing. As an assistant vice president of Macmillan, she helped launch two of the company's best sellers, Watership Down and Jonathan Livingston Seagull. In 1978 she started her own literary agency, Connie Clausen & Associates, which had a series of best sellers, including the beauty books by the photographer Francesco Scavullo, the Pulitzer Prize-winning Jackson Pollock: An American Saga by Steven Naifeh and Gregory White Smith, "Eat to Win," "The Rules," and many others. She was also the long-time American agent for the British author Quentin Crisp.

Clausen was portrayed by Swoosie Kurtz in the ITV film production of An Englishman in New York, a sequel to The Naked Civil Servant.

== Filmography ==
=== Television ===
Year	Title	Role	Notes
1952	Suspense	Martha	Episode: "The Debt"
1952	The Web	—N/a	Episode: "The Best of Everything"
1953	Tales of Tomorrow	—N/a	Episode: "The Lonesome Village"
1953	Man Against Crime	Joan	Episode: "Free Ride"
1954	Colonel Humphrey Flack	—N/a	Episode: "Prince Fahz of Baklava"
1954	The Big Story	Dee Victor	Episode: "The Sioux City Story"
1970–1971	The Doctors	Mrs. Clark / Helen Fawcett	3 episodes
