= Naifeh =

Naifeh is the surname of:

- Alfred Naifeh (1915–1942), US Navy lieutenant, namesake of the destroyer escort USS Naifeh
- Ali H. Nayfeh (1933–2017), Palestinian-Jordanian mathematician, mechanical engineer and physicist
- Ameen Nayfeh (born 1988), Palestinian film director and writer
- Jimmy Naifeh (born 1939), American politician
- Marion Naifeh (1928—2023), American author
- Munir Nayfeh (born 1945), Palestinian-American particle physicist
- Steven Naifeh (born 1952), American biographer
- Ted Naifeh, American comic book writer and artist
