= 2 Broadway murals (Lee Krasner) =

1959 murals by Lee Krasner

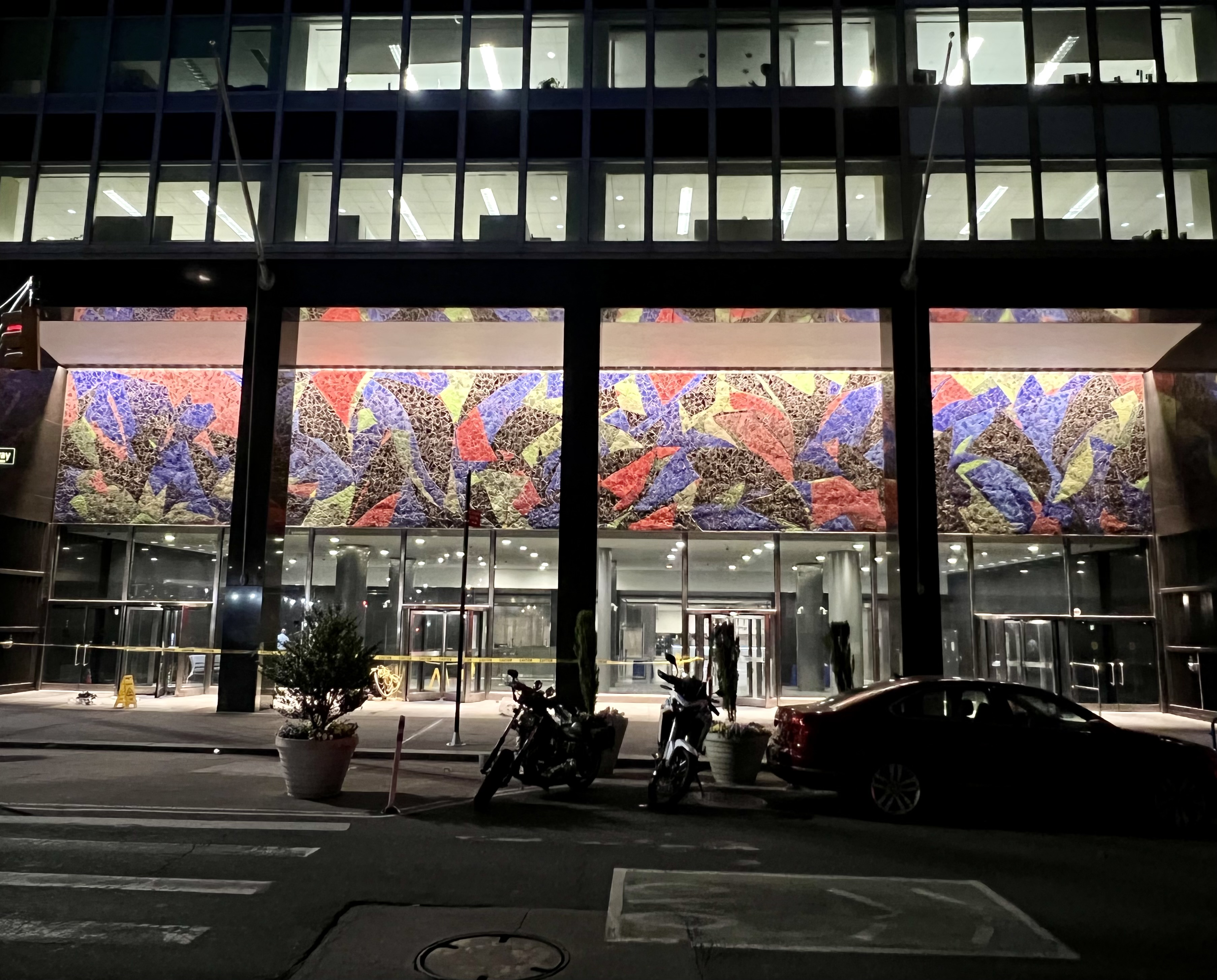
- Mural over the Broadway entrance seen at night in May 2023
- Artist: Lee Krasner
- Year: 1959
- Medium: Glass tesserae
- Movement: Abstract Expressionism
- Dimensions: 86 ft by 12 ft; 15 ft by 15 ft
- Location: New York City

The 2 Broadway murals are a pair of untitled decorative mosaic murals by the American artist Lee Krasner completed in 1959 and located at 2 Broadway in Lower Manhattan, New York. They were commissioned in 1958 by the New York-based real estate company Uris Brothers, which was headquartered at and owned the office building at 2 Broadway. Krasner designed and completed the murals in collaboration with her nephew, Ronald Stein.

Both murals are abstract and consist of colorful interlocking planes made from glass tesserae in green, blue, gold, black, and crimson, echoing the dynamism of Krasner's Abstract Expressionist painting style. The larger mural, installed above the Broadway entrance, is 86 feet by 12 feet, while the smaller one is 15 feet by 15 feet and placed above the back entrance facing Broad Street.

In 1959, the architecture critic Douglas Haskell commended the main mural in an otherwise critical review of the building, while the writer Leslie George Katz dismissed both. B. H. Friedman, the Uris Brothers executive who oversaw the commission, later called it in many ways the most important he had been involved with, and in 1973 the art historian Marcia Tucker called the front mural one of the few successful exterior wall pieces made on its scale.

== History ==
=== Background ===
By the early 1950s, Lee Krasner was one of the few female American abstract artists associated with the New York School, a group which included Jackson Pollock, Willem de Kooning, and Mark Rothko, among others. However, her achievements and work were often eclipsed by the fame of Pollock, whom she married in 1945. Following Pollock's untimely death in a drunk driving incident in Long Island in 1956, Krasner's style of painting evolved into a more expressive and gestural style. By 1957, Krasner had begun working in Pollock's former barn studio located near their house in the Springs, allowing her to shift her painting practice toward mural scale.

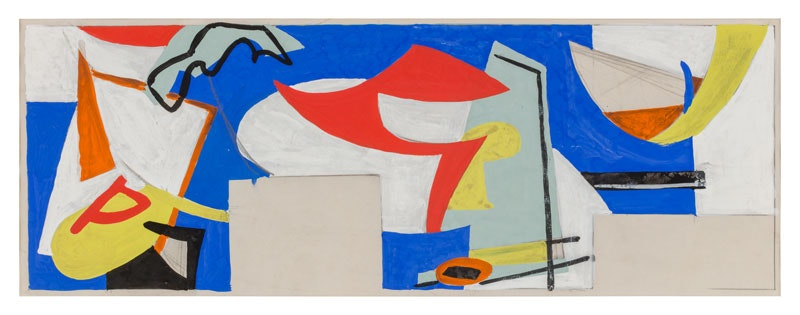
Lee Krasner, Untitled Mural Study, 1940. Gouache on paper, 17 × 22 inches. Study for a mural Krasner designed for the WPA, an American New Deal agency.

In 1958, B. H. Friedman, a vice-president of the New York-based real estate company Uris Brothers and a nephew of its owners, Percy and Harold Uris, commissioned Lee Krasner to create a pair of mosaic murals at the company's corporate headquarters located at 2 Broadway in Lower Manhattan. Friedman had previously seen and admired a mosaic table at Krasner's home, which she had executed in 1947 using tesserae left over from her husband Jackson Pollock's work at the Works Progress Administration. He also knew the mural designs Krasner had made for the WPA in the 1940s. None of those designs was executed at full scale, which made the 2 Broadway mosaic Krasner's first completed mural.

=== Commission ===
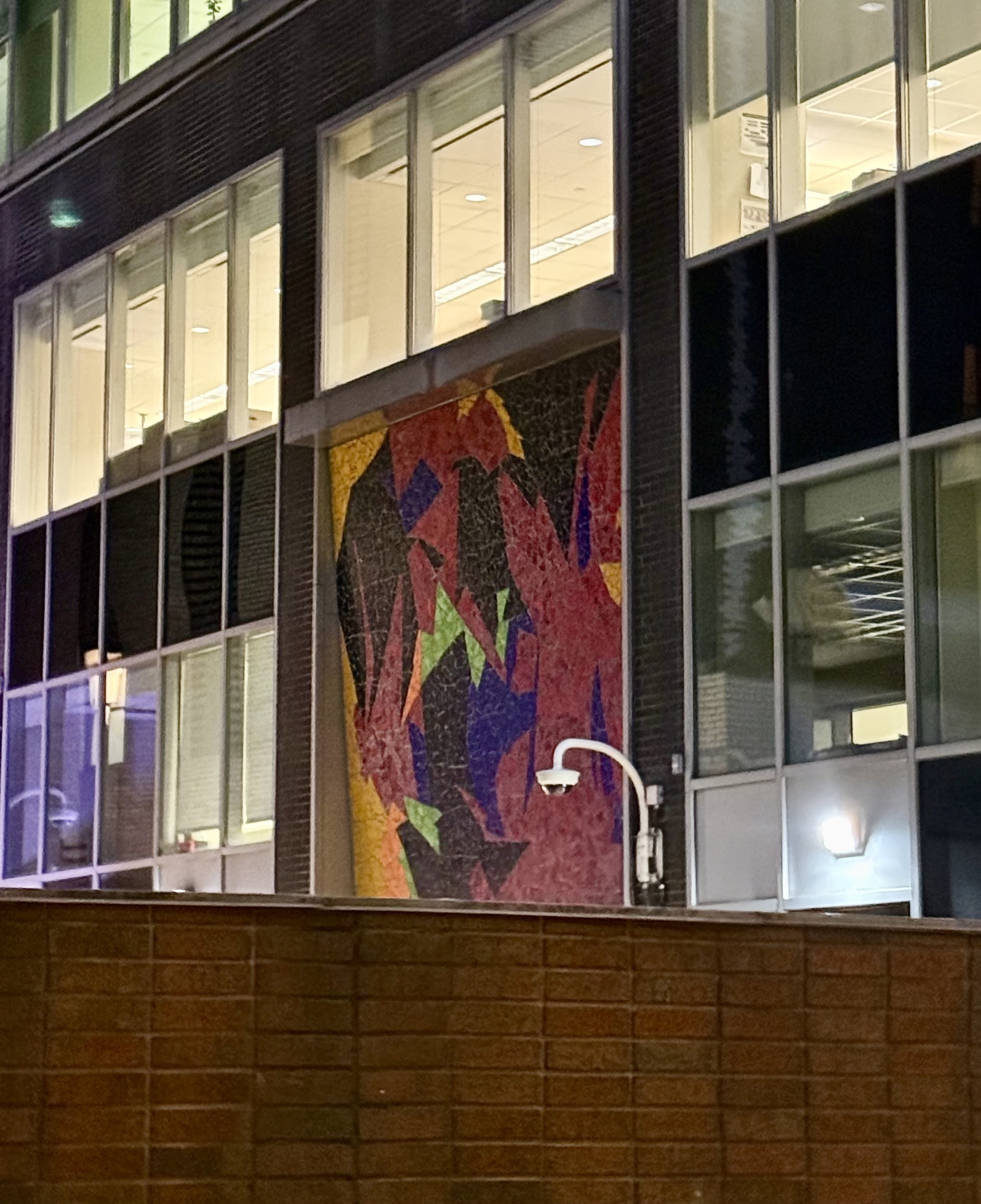
The second mural, partially concealed by a bricked wall, installed above the back entrance to 2 Broadway. View from Marketfield Street.

The office building at 2 Broadway, designed by Emery Roth & Sons and constructed between 1958 and 1959, replaced George B. Post's 1884 New York Produce Exchange building. Krasner designed the murals in collaboration with her nephew, Ronald Stein, and the works were installed in 1959. Both murals are abstract, depicting an arrangement of colorful planes in green, gold, black, and crimson hues made using glass tesserae. Due to union laws, Krasner was not allowed to work with the material directly and had to instruct workmen to break the glass and then arrange it on the surface of each mural. The mosaic was made of Venetian glass shattered into fragments. According to the American art historian Barbara Rose, working on the collage maquettes in preparation for the murals provided Krasner "with a means of translating her winged, floral, and organic forms into monumental abstractions on a public scale".

The larger work, measuring 86 feet by 12 feet, was installed above the entryway facing Broadway while the smaller one, measuring 15 feet by 15 feet, is above the Broad Street entrance. The interjecting colorful planes of both murals evoked the dynamic visual compositions of Lee Krasner's 1950s painting practice. Scholar Emily Warner describes the work as "an explosion of swooping forms, splintered tiles, and craggy edges". The work's composition has been compared to Krasner's 1955 painting Bald Eagle where "cluster of irregular swatches" are seen distributed "rhythmically" across the space of the composition.

== Reception ==
Reviewing 2 Broadway for Architectural Forum in February 1959, its editor, Douglas Haskell, criticized it as a "quick-return, low-cost" office block that blocked the view of Broadway from the harbor approach to Lower Manhattan, but ended by commending the "distinguished mosaic mural" by Krasner and Stein, which he credited to Friedman. Friedman, who had overseen the commission, wrote about the work in Craft Horizons, arguing that the mosaic would "relieve" and "make human" the building's 307-foot frontage on Broadway. Writing in The Nation that July, Leslie George Katz dismissed both the building, which he called a "glittering nonentity", and the mosaic, "an innocuous arabesque of round and jagged colored shapes" that, like the building, was "committed to nothing" beyond itself.

In a 1972 interview for the Archives of American Art, Friedman described the murals as "in many ways ... the most important commission that I ever had anything to do with" and praised Krasner's "very exciting solution" for the "difficult sites" of the Broadway and Broad Street entrances. According to the art historian Marcia Tucker, the front mural "remains one of the few successful, architecturally appropriate exterior wall pieces to have been done on this scale".

== See also ==
- Architecture of New York City
- Abstract expressionism
- New York School (art)
- Federal Art Project
- Public art

== Sources ==
- Cooke, Rachel (May 12, 2019). "Reframing Lee Krasner, the artist formerly known as Mrs Pollock". The Observer. ISSN 0029-7712.
- Farago, Jason (August 19, 2019). "Lee Krasner, Hiding in Plain Sight". The New York Times.
- Friedman, B. H. (January–February 1959). "Manhattan Mosaic". Craft Horizons. Vol. 19. p. 26.
- Friedman, B. H. (November 10, 1972). "Oral history interview with Bernard Harper Friedman" (PDF) (Interview). Interviewed by Paul Cummings. Archives of American Art, Smithsonian Institution.
- Haskell, Douglas (February 1959). "Off Tune on Broadway". Architectural Forum. Vol. 110, no. 2. pp. 103–105.
- Hobbs, Robert Carleton (1993). Lee Krasner. Modern Masters. Vol. 15. New York: Abbeville Press. ISBN 978-1-55859-283-4.
- Katz, Leslie (July 18, 1959). "Obituary for a Building". The Nation. pp. 37–38.
- Landau, Ellen G. (1995). Lee Krasner: A Catalogue Raisonné. With the assistance of Jeffrey D. Grove. New York: Harry N. Abrams. ISBN 0-8109-3513-9.
- Levin, Gail (2011). Lee Krasner: A Biography. New York: William Morrow. ISBN 978-0-06-184527-7.
- Naylor, Colin, ed. (1989). Contemporary Artists (3rd ed.). Chicago and London: St. James Press. ISBN 978-0-912289-96-0.
- Rose, Barbara (1983). Lee Krasner: A Retrospective (exh. cat.). New York: The Museum of Modern Art and Museum of Fine Arts, Houston. ISBN 978-0-87070-415-4.
- Solly, Meilan (2019). "Revisiting the Artistic Legacy of Lee Krasner, Jackson Pollock's Wife". Smithsonian.
- Stern, Robert A. M.; Mellins, Thomas; Fishman, David (1995). New York 1960: Architecture and Urbanism Between the Second World War and the Bicentennial. New York: Monacelli Press. ISBN 1-885254-02-4. OCLC 32159240.
- Tucker, Marcia (1973). Lee Krasner: Large Paintings (exh. cat.). New York: Whitney Museum of American Art. LCCN 73-88962.
- Warner, Emily (May 26, 2020). "Ornament and Obsolescence: Lee Krasner's Mosaics for Wall Street". The Courtauld (Event abstract). London: Courtauld Institute of Art.
- Wasserman, Emily (March 1968). "Lee Krasner in Mid-Career". Artforum. 6 (7): 38–43.
- Weber, Bruce (January 10, 2011). "B. H. Friedman, a Novelist, Art Critic and Pollock Biographer, Is Dead at 84". The New York Times. ISSN 0362-4331.
- Wichmann, Natalie (December 19, 2019). "Lee Krasner's New York City IV: Giant mosaic on Broadway". Schirn Mag. Schirn Kunsthalle Frankfurt.
- Williams, Reba White (2001). "The Prints of Lee Krasner". Print Quarterly. 18 (4): 396–413. ISSN 0265-8305. JSTOR 41826272.
