= Sanford Friedman =

American novelist

Sanford Friedman (June 11, 1928 – April 20, 2010) was an American novelist. He was gay and his books often featured LGBT themes.

Friedman's Totempole (1965) features an army love affair between its protagonist and a North Korean doctor war prisoner. Some have identified the Stephen Wolfe persona in this novel as being the first instance of a main character who is both Jewish and gay in American fiction.

== Life ==
Friedman was born to a Jewish family in New York City, the second son of Leonard and Madeline (Uris) Friedman; his elder brother, B. H. Friedman, also became a writer.

A 1945 graduate of the Horace Mann School, and in the same class as his lifelong friend Allard K. Lowenstein, Friedman earned his BFA from the Carnegie Institute of Technology. From 1951 to 1953, he served in the US Army as a military policeman in Korea, where he was awarded a Bronze Star. He taught writing at the Juilliard School and at SAGE.

He was a friend to many noted artists, among them Lee Krasner and Fritz Bultman, and for several years Friedman was the companion of the noted American poet, translator, and critic Richard Howard. Howard dedicated his poem "1915: A Pre-Raphaelite Ending, London" to him.

Friedman also was active off-Broadway as a writer and producer, collaborating with actor Howard Da Silva; author Ben Maddow; and playwright Arnold Perl. Perl's play "Tevya and his Daughters" (1957) -- co-produced by Friedman and starring Mike Kellin as Sholem Aleichem's dairyman—was the inspiration for "Fiddler on the Roof (1964)." In 1968, Friedman signed the "Writers and Editors War Tax Protest" pledge, vowing to refuse tax payments in protest against the Vietnam War.

Friedman died of a heart attack in his Manhattan apartment on April 20, 2010.

== Awards and honors ==
In 1965 Friedman was given the O. Henry Award from the Society of Arts & Sciences for Ocean, which formed part of his novel Totempole.

== List of works ==
- Totempole (1965)
- A Haunted Woman (1968)
- Still Life: Two Short Novels (1975)
- Fritz Bultman: bronze sculpture 1963-1975, exhibition January 10 to February 7, 1976, with text by Sanford Friedman and footnotes to the exhibition by the artist (1976)
- Rip Van Winkle (1980)
- Conversations with Beethoven (2014)

== Bibliography ==
- Playing the game: The Homosexual Novel in America by Roger Austen, Bobbs-Merrill, 1977.
- Interview: A conversation with Richard Howard by Paul H. Gray, Text and Performance Quarterly, Volume 2 Issue 1 1981, pages 76–88
- Alternative service: Families in recent American gay fiction. The Kenyon Review, 8(3), 72–90. Bergman, D. (1986).
- Diminishing Fictions: Essays on the Modern Novel and Its Critics by Bruce Bawer, Graywolf Press, 1988.
- The Gay Novel in America (Garland Gay and Lesbian Studies) by James Levin, Garland Publishing, 1991.
- Gaiety Transfigured: Gay Self-Representation in American Literature (Wisconsin Project on American Writers) by David Bergman, University of Wisconsin Press, 1991.
- Contemporary gay American novelists: A Bio-Bibliographical Critical Sourcebook by Emmanuel Sampath Nelson, Greenwood, 1993.
- Queer Representations: Reading Lives, Reading Cultures (A Center for Lesbian and Gay Studies Book) by Martin Duberman, NYU Press, 1997.
- Sanford Friedman in Contemporary Jewish-American Novelists by Joel Shatzky, Greenwood Publishing, 1997.
- Particular Voices: Portraits of Gay and Lesbian Writers by Robert Giard, The MIT Press, 1997.
- Lineland: Mortality and Mercy on the Internet's Pynchon-L@Waste.Or by Jules Siegel, Intangible Assets Manufacturing, 1997, p. 90.
- Edward Albee: a singular journey by Mel Gussow, Simon & Schuster, 1999.
- Gay Histories and Cultures: An Encyclopedia by George E. Haggerty, Garland, 2000
- Gay Fiction Speaks: Conversations With Gay Novelists by Richard Canning Softcover, Columbia Univ Press, 2001.
- The Violet Hour: The Violet Quill and the Making of Gay Culture by David Bergman, Columbia University Press, 2004.
- Brainwashing: The Fictions of Mind Control : A Study of Novels and Films Since World War II by David Seed, Kent State University Press, 2004.
- The Oxford Encyclopedia of American literature vol. 2; William Faulkner-Mina Loy, edited by Jay Parini, Oxford University Press, 2004.
- The Man Who Would Marry Susan Sontag: And Other Intimate Literary Portraits of the Bohemian Era by Edward Field, University of Wisconsin Press, 2006.
- Lee Krasner's Skepticism and Her Emergent Postmodernism by Robert Hobbs, Woman's Art Journal 28, No. 2 (Fall/Winter 2007).
- American Jewish Fiction: A JPS Guide by Josh Lambert, Jewish Publication Society, 2009.
