= Pollock (film) =

2000 film directed by Ed Harris

- Theatrical release poster
- Directed by: Ed Harris
- Screenplay by: Barbara Turner; Susan J. Emshwiller
- Based on: Jackson Pollock: An American Saga by Steven Naifeh; Gregory White Smith
- Produced by: James Francis Trezza; Fred Berner; Ed Harris; Jon Kilik
- Starring: Ed Harris; Marcia Gay Harden; Tom Bower; Jennifer Connelly; Bud Cort; John Heard; Val Kilmer; Robert Knott; David Leary; Amy Madigan; Sally Murphy; Molly Regan; Stephanie Seymour; Matthew Sussman; Jeffrey Tambor; Sada Thompson; Norbert Weisser
- Cinematography: Lisa Rinzler
- Edited by: Kathryn Himoff
- Music by: Jeff Beal
- Production companies: Zeke Films; Brant-Allen Films; Fred Berner Films
- Distributed by: Sony Pictures Classics
- Release dates: September 6, 2000 (Venice); December 15, 2000 (United States)
- Running time: 122 minutes
- Country: United States
- Language: English
- Box office: $10.5 million

Pollock is a 2000 American independent biographical drama film centered on the life of painter Jackson Pollock, his struggles with alcoholism, as well as his troubled marriage to his wife Lee Krasner. It stars Ed Harris, Marcia Gay Harden, Jennifer Connelly, Val Kilmer, Robert Knott, Bud Cort, Molly Regan, and Sada Thompson. It was directed by Harris.

Harden won the Academy Award for Best Supporting Actress for portraying Krasner. Harris received an Academy Award nomination for Best Actor for his portrayal of Pollock. The film was a long-term personal project for Harris based on him having read the 1989 biography Jackson Pollock: An American Saga, written by Steven Naifeh and Gregory White Smith.

== Plot ==
In the 1940s, abstract expressionist painter Jackson Pollock exhibited paintings in occasional group art shows. He lives with his brother Sande and sister-in-law Arloie at a tiny apartment in New York City. With Arloie expecting a new baby, Pollock decides to move out on her behalf. Soon afterwards, Pollock meets and takes an interest in artist Lee Krasner. He learns later that his brother has taken a job in Connecticut building military gliders to avoid the draft.

Pollock, a struggling alcoholic, goes on a drinking binge and is found in a disheveled state by Sande and Lee, prompting Sande to tell Lee that Pollock has been diagnosed as "clinically neurotic." Taking pity on Pollock, Lee takes him home and becomes his manager. Pollock's old friend Reuben Kadish visits him, bringing along Howard Putzel, who works for wealthy art collector Peggy Guggenheim. After Guggenheim views his work, he is given a contract to exhibit his paintings, plus a commission to paint a 8 ft by 20 ft mural in her New York townhouse entry way. Pollock's first exhibit fails to attract any buyers. After a New Year's Eve party, a drunken Pollock almost sleeps with Peggy. Afterwards, he falls into another stupor upon hearing that Putzel has died.

Pollock and Lee marry after Lee says they will either marry or "split up" before moving to Long Island. During a get-together at Peggy's, Pollock dismisses art critic Clement Greenberg's comments and refuses to change his painting style to be more marketable. Pollock's paintings are not selling but Clement assures him it will change after a Life magazine article about him is published and his upcoming exhibit.

Pollock and Lee's relationship is strained after he openly flirts with another woman. Endeavoring to earn more income, he tries working in various occupations but fails due to his alcoholism. He lies to Sande about how much money he has, although his financial status improves after the Life story is released. Later, cinematographer Hans Namuth films Pollock as he paints, though Namuth's presence interrupts the spontaneous nature of his work. Pollock, who tried abstaining from alcohol, inadvertently ruins Thanksgiving dinner upon relapsing.

In medias res to the events of the film, Pollock autographs a copy of Life for a fan at an art exhibit in 1950. In 1955, Clement tells Pollock that the Partisan Review favors artist Clyfford Still, saying his original technique could be the next direction of modern art. A drunk Pollock reacts badly and becomes angrier when Lee berates him for his drinking and womanizing. Pollock's marriage to Lee is even more strained due to her refusing to conceive children with him leading Pollock to start an extramarital affair with abstract artist Ruth Kligman.

In 1956, after a conversation with Lee on the phone while she was in Venice, Pollock told Ruth "I owe the woman something." On a subsequent visit, Ruth brought her friend Edith before the three went on a drive. An intoxicated Pollock crashed the car, killing himself and Edith, and throwing Ruth into a ditch, seriously injuring her. A textual epilogue reveals that Lee never remarried after Pollock's death.

== Cast ==
- Ed Harris as Jackson Pollock
- Marcia Gay Harden as Lee Krasner
- Tom Bower as Dan Miller
- Jennifer Connelly as Ruth Kligman
- Bud Cort as Howard Putzel
- John Heard as Tony Smith
- Val Kilmer as Willem de Kooning
- Robert Knott as Sande Pollock
- David Leary as Charles Pollock
- Amy Madigan as Peggy Guggenheim
- Sally Murphy as Edith Metzger
- Molly Regan as Arloie Pollock
- Stephanie Seymour as Helen Frankenthaler
- Matthew Sussman as Reuben Kadish
- Jeffrey Tambor as Clement Greenberg
- Sada Thompson as Stella Pollock
- Norbert Weisser as Hans Namuth
- Everett Quinton as James Johnson Sweeney
- Annabelle Gurwitch as May Rosenberg
- John Rothman as Harold Rosenberg
- Kenny Scharf as William Baziotes
- Robert O'Neill as Herbert Matter

== Production ==
The film was adapted by Barbara Turner and Susan Emshwiller from the book Jackson Pollock: An American Saga by Steven Naifeh and Gregory White Smith. It was directed by Ed Harris.

The film was a longtime passion project for Harris. After his father gave him a copy of Pollock's biography, he started thinking about adapting it, which took almost 10 years to bring to fruition. Filming took a mere 50 days with a six-week layoff after forty days so Harris could take time to gain thirty pounds and grow a beard.

Harris himself did all the painting seen in the film.

== Reception ==
=== Critical response ===
On the review aggregator website Rotten Tomatoes, 79% of 111 critics' reviews are positive, with an average rating of 6.9/10. The website's consensus reads: "Though Pollock does not really allow audiences a glimpse of the painter as a person, it does powerfully depict the creative process. Harris throws himself into the role and turns in a compelling performance." Metacritic, which uses a weighted average, assigned the film a score of 77 out of 100, based on 31 critics, indicating "generally favorable" reviews.

Roger Ebert of the Chicago Sun-Times gave the film four out of four stars and wrote, "Pollock is confident, insightful work–one of the year's best films. Harris is always a good actor but here seems possessed, as if he had a leap of empathy for Pollock. His direction is assured, economical, knows where it's going and what it wants to do. No fancy visual gimmicks, just the look and feel of this world."

=== Box office ===
Pollock opened on December 15, 2000 in the U.S. and Canada in a limited release in 2 theaters and grossed $44,244 with an average of $22,122 per theater and ranking #37 at the box office. The film's widest release was 280 theaters and it ended up earning $8,598,593 domestically and $1,960,377 internationally for a total of $10,558,970.

=== Accolades ===
Award	Category	Nominee(s)	Result
Academy Awards	Best Actor	Ed Harris	Nominated
Academy Awards	Best Supporting Actress	Marcia Gay Harden	Won
Awards Circuit Community Awards	Best Actor in a Leading Role	Ed Harris	Nominated
Awards Circuit Community Awards	Best Actress in a Supporting Role	Marcia Gay Harden	Nominated
Camerimage	Golden Frog	Lisa Rinzler	Nominated
Independent Spirit Awards	Best Supporting Female	Marcia Gay Harden	Nominated
National Society of Film Critics Awards	Best Supporting Actress	Marcia Gay Harden	3rd Place
New York Film Critics Circle Awards	Best Supporting Actress	Marcia Gay Harden	Won
Online Film & Television Association Awards	Best Actor	Ed Harris	Nominated
Satellite Awards	Best Actor in a Motion Picture – Drama	Ed Harris	Nominated
Toronto Film Critics Association Awards	Best Male Performance	Ed Harris	Won
World Soundtrack Awards	Discovery of the Year	Jeff Beal	Nominated

== Soundtrack ==
The soundtrack to Pollock was released on February 13, 2001.

No.	Title	Artist	Length
1.	"Alone in a Crowd"	Jeff Beal	2:14
2.	"Beauty from Pain"	Jeff Beal	1:55
3.	"One Man Show"	Jeff Beal	2:02
4.	"The Window"	Jeff Beal	1:37
5.	"Stroke of Genius"	Jeff Beal	3:57
6.	"Plant Your Garden"	Jeff Beal	2:12
7.	"Stroke by Stroke"	Jeff Beal	2:45
8.	"Breaking the Rules"	Jeff Beal	2:27
9.	"Art of This Century"	Jeff Beal	1:04
10.	"The Look"	Jeff Beal	2:45
11.	"A Life's Work"	Jeff Beal	1:27
12.	"Empty"	Jeff Beal	2:42
13.	"A Letter from Lee"	Jeff Beal	1:52
14.	"The World Keeps Turning"	Jeff Beal / Kathleen Brennan / Tom Waits	4:14
15.	"Unfinished"	Jeff Beal	4:08
16.	"The Mural Goes on and On"	Jeff Beal	2:41
17.	"She Played the Banjo"	Jeff Beal	4:31
Total length:			44:33
