= Yarborough (novel) =

1964 novel by B. H. Friedman

- 1st edition cover
- Author: B. H. Friedman
- Language: English
- Genre: Literary fiction
- Published: 1964 (World); 2022 (Tough Poets)
- Publication place: United States
- Pages: 374 (1st edition)
- ISBN: 9798218078997

Yarborough is a literary fiction novel by B. H. Friedman. It was published on November 9, 1964, by World Publishing Company and received mixed reviews.

== Plot ==
Yarborough follows Arthur Skelton, a professional bridge player, as he tries to find meaning in his life.

== Development history ==
=== Publication history ===
The novel was first published on November 9, 1964, by World Publishing Company. It was republished in 2022 by Tough Poets Press, a small press dedicated to publishing out-of-print classics.

=== Explanation of novel's title ===
In the game of bridge, "yarborough" is a term used to describe a hand with no card higher than a nine, which generally makes it impossible to win the game. Several reviews connected the concept of a yarborough to Arthur Skelton's life circumstances.

== Reception ==
Yarborough divided critics upon release. Positive reviews tended to praise Friedman's prose and the story, while negative reviews criticized those aspects. A retrospective review on The Neglected Books Page characterized the critical divide as primarily being one between East Coast critics and Midwestern critics.

Kirkus Reviews noted that the book touched on similar themes as Friedman's first novel, Circles, which was published in 1962. The Kansas City Star praised Friedman for avoiding some of the more technical details of bridge and wrote that "Friedman's achievement is to make us like so thoroughly and believe so thoroughly in a man who believes in so little." The News & Observer wrote positively about the story and compared Friedman to Thomas Wolfe. A review in the Chicago Tribune described the novel as a "direct and powerful" presentation of existentialism, while The Cincinnati Enquirer recommended it to "bridge fanatic[s]" and "dope fiend[s]."

The New York Review of Books' Philip Rahv described the book as "readable enough" but criticized Friedman for flat characterization and writing an unsatisfying ending. In England, The Daily Telegraph criticized Friedman for his excessive use of profanity. A review in the San Francisco Examiner acknowledged Friedman's talent as a writer but criticized the novel's tone. Pierre Fourrier, writing in the Los Angeles Times, said that the novel was "no more successful" than the bridge hand its title was derived from and described Friedman's prose as "often a drag."
