= Jackson Pollock: An American Saga =

Biography by Naifeh and Smith

- Author: Steven Naifeh, Gregory White Smith
- Language: English
- Genre: Biography
- Publication date: 1989

Jackson Pollock: An American Saga is a 1989 biography of abstract expressionist painter Jackson Pollock, by Steven Naifeh and Gregory White Smith. It was awarded the 1991 Pulitzer Prize for Biography or Autobiography.

== Reception ==
It was considered "well-researched" by Publishers Weekly and Library Journal. The book's reception inspired Ed Harris to adapt it to film as Pollock in 2000. Marcia Gay Harden received the Academy Award for Best Supporting Actress for the role of Lee Krasner.

In the New York Times Book Review, author and critic Elizabeth Frank said the work was especially strong on Krasner:"The Pollock-Krasner relationship becomes the center of the book, as indeed it should in any biography of Pollock, and to a certain extent the book even becomes Krasner's story more than Pollack's."

== Composition ==
The book was the first to explore the artist with psychological depth, based on interviews with over 850 people. The authors researched for eight years, had insight into various unpublished documents, medical and psychiatric reports, and conversations with the artist's friends and widow Lee Krasner.

== First edition ==
- C. N. Potter, 1989, ISBN 0-517-56084-4

== See also ==
- Pollock (film)
