= Gregory White Smith =

American biographer (1951–2014)

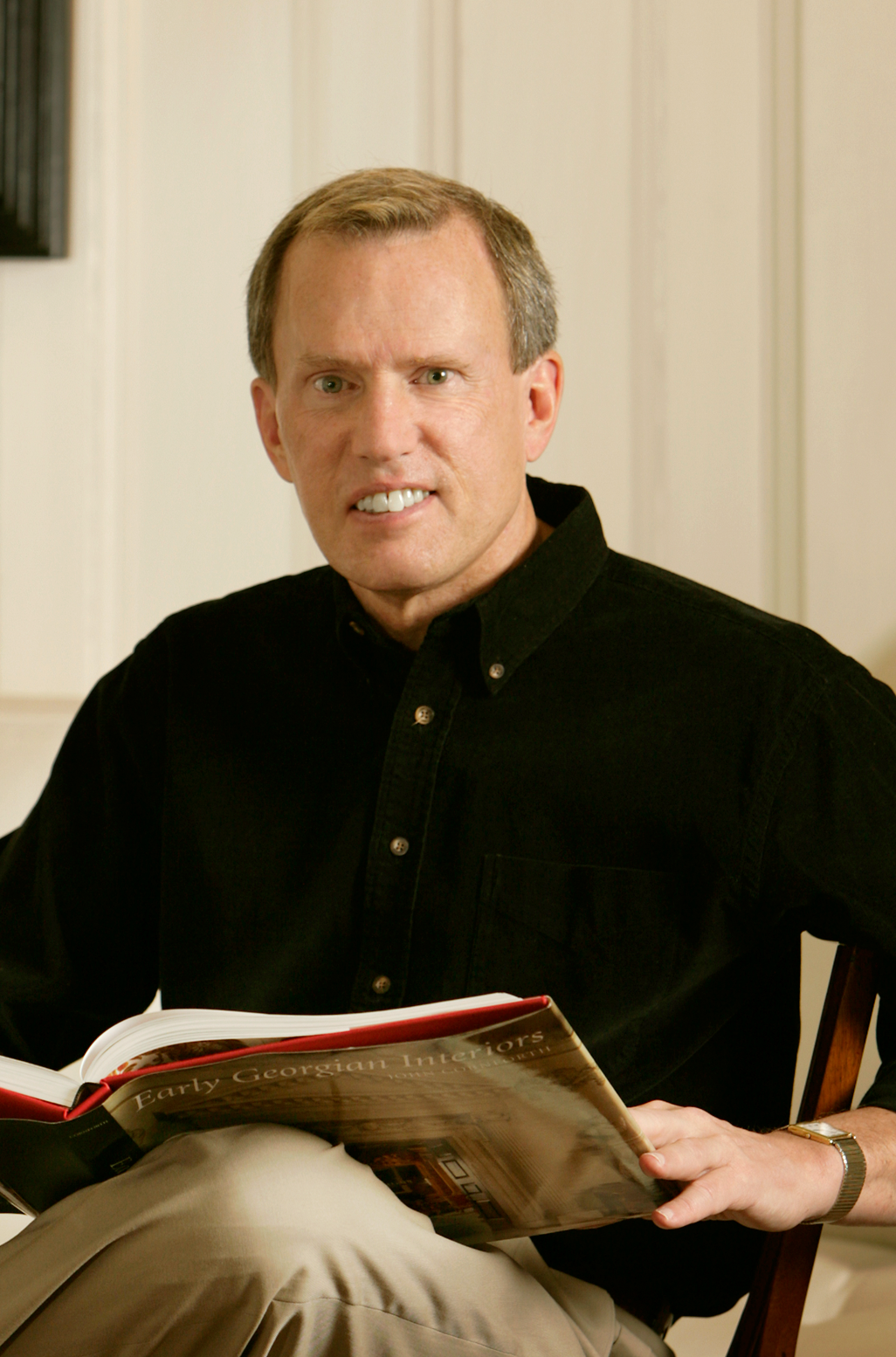
- Born: October 4, 1951; Ithaca, New York
- Died: April 10, 2014 (aged 62); Aiken, South Carolina
- Education: Colby College; Harvard Law School; Harvard Graduate School of Education
- Occupation: Author
- Website: www.vangoghbiography.com; www.bestlawyers.com

Gregory White Smith (October 4, 1951 – April 10, 2014) was an American biographer of both Jackson Pollock and Vincent van Gogh. In addition to writing 18 books with Steven Naifeh, Smith was an accomplished musician, historic preservationist, art collector, philanthropist, attorney, and businessman who founded several companies including Best Lawyers, which spawned an entire industry of professional rankings.

His brain tumor, which was diagnosed in 1975, led to 13 brain surgeries as well as radiation and nuclear medicine treatments and experimental chemotherapeutic regimens. His search for cutting-edge medical care was profiled on CBS's 60 Minutes and recounted in his book Making Miracles Happen.

Jackson Pollock: An American Saga was published in 1990, winning the 1991 Pulitzer Prize for Biography or Autobiography. The Philadelphia Inquirer called the book "Brilliant and definitive ... so absorbing in its narrative drive and so exhaustively detailed that it makes everything that came before seem like trial balloons." Van Gogh: The Life, which Michiko Kakutani of The New York Times called "magisterial", was published in 2011 with a companion website hosting over 6,000 pages of notes.

== Personal life ==
Smith was born in Ithaca, New York, on October 4, 1951, and was raised in Columbus, Ohio, where he attended the Columbus Academy. "Walking to school beginning at an early age", Naifeh said, "he would think of a sentence. Then, talking out loud, as he did for the rest of his life, he would try different ways to articulate the same thought, clarifying the idea and giving the words more character and force. It was the beginning of a lifelong love of and gift for words." "Also at age eight, Smith began dictating short novels into a Dictaphone his father used in business, which his mother transcribed. 'They were only 25 or 30 pages long,' Smith said, 'and the work of a child. But I was so thrilled that my mother typed them. There was my name at the top of the first page, 'By Gregory White Smith.'"

"As editor of his high school newspaper, he once wrote an editorial about the French experience in Vietnam and its lessons for the United States. When the headmaster burned all of the copies of the paper, Smith called on the headmaster to resign. 'Greg was already showing his fiercely combative spirit,' Naifeh said, 'the same spirit that would get him through a lifelong battle against a terrible disease and unending pain.'"

He graduated from Colby College in 1973, spent a year studying music in Europe on a Watson Fellowship, and then enrolled at the Harvard Law School. He graduated from the Law School in 1977, and received a master's degree in education, also from Harvard, in 1978.

Smith was a singer and choral conductor. He founded the Colby Eight in 1972 and served as assistant conductor of the Harvard Glee Club, where he helped prepare choruses for such conductors as Leonard Bernstein, Seiji Ozawa, and Mstislav Rostropovich, from 1974 to 1979.

Smith received honorary doctorates from the University of South Carolina Aiken in 1998, the Juilliard School in 2012, and Colby College in 2013.

In 1989, along with his partner Naifeh, he purchased the Joye Cottage in Aiken, South Carolina. Together, they restored the historic Whitney-Vanderbilt house, a creation of both Stanford White and Carrère and Hastings. The story of that renovation is told in their book, On a Street Called Easy, In a Cottage Called Joye, which The New York Times called "wry and gentle ... house-and-garden renovations gone delectably awry." They are leaving the house to be a residence for artists in music, drama, and dance.

In 2009, with Sandra Field, Smith co-founded the Juilliard in Aiken Festival, a performing arts festival that brings dozens of artists to Aiken each year for performances and has provided educational outreach to more than 16,000 students in an area covering parts of Georgia and South Carolina. The year Smith died, the Festival culminated in an early-music performance of Bach's St. Matthew Passion that was presented not only in Aiken but in Spivey Hall in Atlanta and Alice Tully Hall at Lincoln Center. James R. Oestreich wrote in The New York Times that the performance contained "flashes of brilliance, all right. But what made the event so deeply satisfying was mainly the consistent excellence of all its parts."

In 1975, a few months after beginning Harvard Law School, Smith began experiencing unexplained skeletal pain. After six months of clinical investigation, he was diagnosed with a hemangiopericytoma, a tumor so rare it landed him on the cover of the New England Journal of Medicine. Uncertain that he could survive the disease – in 1987, he was given three months to live – Smith, together with Naifeh, spent the rest of his life finding doctors around the world who could perform operations or improvise treatments to keep him alive long enough for the next lifesaving treatment to emerge.

Smith's survival was featured on a segment of CBS's 60 Minutes in 1997. He was asked by Morley Safer, "Everyone must ask the question when given what appears to be a death sentence, 'Why me?'" Smith answered, "I've been very, very lucky in my life. I had a great family – have a great family. I have Steve. I've been endowed with some talents. I've had a chance to write a book that I'm very proud of. I have great friends. And never once in all those things, I never once said, 'Why?' So how can I demand from the universe some sort of rationale for the bad that I've never demanded for the good?"

Smith married Steven Naifeh, his co-author and partner of 40 years, in 2011.

"It took enormous grit and determination to stage this heroic ongoing battle against his brain tumor", Naifeh said to the Aiken Standard. "Yet, it never robbed him of his passion for life. Or his sweetness. He was so unassuming about his intellectual gifts, so guileless, that he had an extraordinary capacity to help people understand how special they were in their own ways."

== Career ==
Smith worked as an associate attorney at the law firm of Morrison & Foerster and as an editor at the Free Press, where he published the Encyclopedia of Crime and Justice in 1983.

He was the author, all with Naifeh, of many books including five New York Times bestsellers.

Smith and Naifeh published Jackson Pollock: An American Saga in 1990, which won the 1991 Pulitzer Prize for Biography or Autobiography and was also a finalist for the National Book Award.

Interview magazine said of the book, "For once, with this intense, engrossing, and indeed brilliant work, we have a biography that justifies its length. Seldom have the history of an artist, the development of his imagination, and the fevers of his soul been more grandly yet intimately described."

The book was adapted into an Academy Award-winning film by Ed Harris in 2000, Pollock. Harris said the biography was "the bible for the project and remained so until filming was completed." The biography also served as an inspiration for John Updike's Seek My Face. "It would be in vain", Updike wrote, "to deny that a large number of details come from the admirable, exhaustive 'Jackson Pollock: An American Saga.'"

Smith and Naifeh also wrote Van Gogh: The Life, which was called "the definitive work for decades to come" by Leo Jansen of the Van Gogh Museum, in 2011.

Time wrote: "Steven Naifeh and Gregory White Smith, whose 1989 biography of Jackson Pollock won the Pulitzer Prize, have written this generation's definitive portrait of the great Dutch post-Impressionist. ... Their most important achievement is to produce a reckoning with van Gogh's occasional 'madness' that doesn't lose sight of the lucidity and intelligence – the profound sanity – of his art." The Boston Globe wrote: "Now, at last, with 'Van Gogh: The Life' by Steven Naifeh and Gregory White Smith, we have what could very well be the definitive biography ... And how pleased we should be that Naifeh and Smith have rendered so exquisitely and respectfully van Gogh's short, intense, and wholly interesting life."

In addition to English, Van Gogh: The Life has been published in Dutch, German, French, Spanish, and Portuguese and is being translated into Italian, Polish, Russian, Chinese, Japanese, and Korean.

Smith and Naifeh also wrote several how-to books to fund the writing of Pollock, including (with Michael Morgenstern), the best-seller How to Make Love to a Woman, which sold several million copies in 29 languages. He wrote several true crime books, including the bestseller The Mormon Murders in 1988 and Final Justice in 1993. The latter was nominated for the Edgar Allan Poe Award for Fact Crime.

Smith's one book of humor, detailing the renovation of Joye Cottage, was well-received: "Page after belly-ticking page", wrote The Washington Post. "Numerous adventures bordering on slapstick. ... A delightful read."

Smith also wrote two television series, one for PBS on the history of the Supreme Court with Archibald Cox and one for NBC on human behavior with Phil Donahue.

Together with Naifeh, Smith founded the legal publishing company Best Lawyers in 1981, which published The Best Lawyers in America, a peer-review list, in 1983. That list went on to become Best Lawyers, a global network linking lawyers and clients. In 2013, Best Lawyers ranked 74,965 lawyers representing 18,034 law firms in 75 countries. In 2009, the company partnered with U.S. News to produce rankings of law firms and in 2014 it gave out 61,138 rankings to 11,681 law firms in 120 practice areas.

== Illness and death ==
Smith died of a brain tumor in 2014 at the age of 62.

His brain tumor, which was diagnosed in 1975, led to 13 brain surgeries as well as radiation and nuclear medicine treatments and experimental chemotherapeutic regimens. His search for cutting-edge medical care was profiled on CBS's 60 Minutes and recounted in his book Making Miracles Happen.

== Bibliography ==
- Moving Up in Style. 1980.
- Gene Davis. 1982.
- How to Make Love to a Woman. (With Michael Morgenstern). 1982.
- The Best Lawyers in America. 1983–2014.
- Why Can't Men Open Up?. 1984.
- Naifeh, Steven; Smith, Gregory White (2005) [1988]. The Mormon Murders. Macmillan. ISBN 0-312934-10-6.
- Jackson Pollock: An American Saga. 1989. OCLC 18907042.
- Final Justice. 1993.
- A Stranger in the Family. 1996.
- The Best Doctors in America. 1992–1997.
- On a Street Called Easy, In a Cottage Called Joye. 1996.
- Making Miracles Happen. 1997.
- Van Gogh: The Life. 2011.
