= B. H. Friedman =

American author and art critic

Bernard Harper Friedman (July 27, 1926 – January 4, 2011), better known by his initials, "B. H.," or known as Bob to his friends was an American author and art critic. He wrote biographies of Jackson Pollock and Gertrude Vanderbilt Whitney, a number of novels that combined his experiences in the worlds of art and business, and an autobiographical account of his use of psychedelic drugs with Timothy Leary.

== Studies ==
Friedman was born on July 27, 1926, in Manhattan, New York City. He is the son of Leonard and Madeline Copland (Uris) Friedman. He enrolled at Cornell University before enlisting in the United States Navy during World War II. He served in the navy from 1944 to 1946. He returned to Cornell after completing his military service and earned his undergraduate degree in literature in 1948. He married his second cousin, Abby Noselson, in 1948, while they were in college.

== Early career ==
Friedman went into the real estate business owned by his uncles Percy Uris and Harold Uris, working his way up to become a director of the Uris Buildings Corporation.

After publishing his first novel — Circles (1962), a story based on life in the art world in New York City and The Hamptons — he left the real estate business to focus on his writing.

== Writings ==
He was an early collector of Pollock's work. He also became a friend of Pollock and Lee Krasner.

He wrote the introduction to the exhibition of Lee Krasner in 1958 at the Martha Jackson Gallery exhibition: "In looking at these paintings (the earth series), listening to them, feeling them, I know that this work - Lee Krasner's most mature and personal, as well as most joyous and positive, to date - was done entirely in the last year and a half, a period of profound sorrow for the artist. The paintings are a stunning affirmation of life."

Jackson Pollock: Energy Made Visible (1972) is considered to be the first biography of the artist; reviewing it for The New York Times, Hilton Kramer called it "a book that everyone interested in the social history of modern art will want to read."

Frustrated by perceived snubs from the major book-publishing firms, Friedman joined other authors, such as Mark Jay Mirsky and Ronald Sukenick, to form the Fiction Collective in 1974, a not-for-profit publishing group whose goals were to "make serious novels and story collections available in simultaneous hard and quality paper editions" and to "keep them in print permanently."

His 1978 book, Gertrude Vanderbilt Whitney: A Biography, provided an account of the life of the artist, art collector and patron of the arts. His autobiographical account, Tripping (2006), recounts his experiences using psychedelic drugs with Timothy Leary.

Friedman died in Manhattan at the age of 84, on January 4, 2011, of pneumonia. He was survived by a daughter, a son and two grandchildren. His wife died in 2003. His younger brother, novelist Sanford Friedman, was born in 1928 and died in 2010.

Novels

- Circles (1962), Fleet Publishing, New York.
- Yarborough (1964), World Publishing, Cleveland.
- Whispers (1971), Ithaca House, New York.
- Museum (1974), Fiction Collective, New York.
- Almost a Life (1975), Viking Press, New York.
- The Polygamist (1981), Little, Brown, Boston.
- My Case Rests (2009), Provincetown Arts Press, Provincetown.

Short Fiction

- Coming Close: A Novella and Three Stories as Alternative Biographies (1982), Fiction Collective, New York.
- Between the Flags: Uncollected Stories 1948-1990 (1990), Fiction Collective, New York.
- Swimming Laps: Stories and Meditations (1999), Edgewise, New York.

Non-Fiction

- School of New York: Some Younger Artists (1959), Grove Press, New York.
- Alfonso Ossorio (1965), H.N. Abrams, New York.
- Jackson Pollock: Energy Made Visible (1972), McGraw-Hill, New York.
- Gertrude Vanderbilt Whitney: A Biography (1978), Doubleday, New York.
- Tripping: A Memoir of Timothy Leary (2006), Provincetown Arts Press, Provincetown.

Drama

- Heart of a Boy (1994), Center for Book Arts, New York.
