= Marion Naifeh =

American author and former educator (1928–2023)

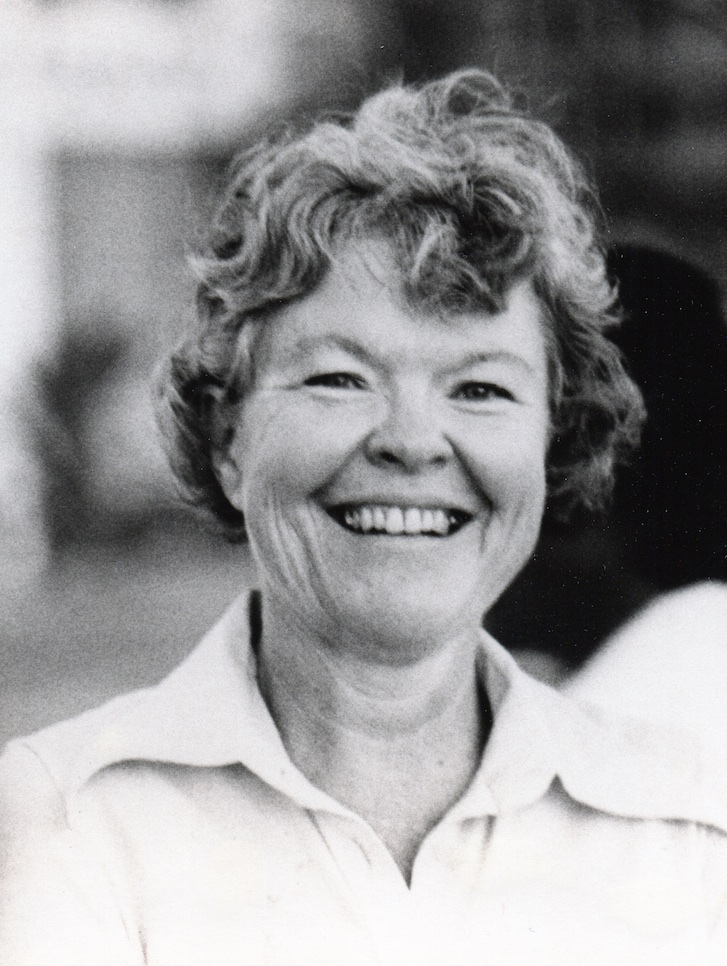
- Born: April 11, 1928; Wuhu, China
- Died: May 20, 2023 (aged 95); Aiken, South Carolina, U.S.
- Education: Wheaton College; Paul H. Nitze School of Advanced International Studies at Johns Hopkins University
- Occupation: Author
- Spouse(s): George Naifeh (m. 1951 – his death, 2006)
- Children: Steven; Carolyn
- Website: http://www.marionnaifeh.com

Marion Carolyn Naifeh (April 11, 1928 — May 20, 2023) was an American author and educator who, with her husband, the late diplomat George Naifeh, represented the United States in diplomatic missions in the Middle East, Africa and South Asia over nearly three decades. As an author, Naifeh published three books. Her 2003 publication, The Last Missionary in China, was described by noted Harvard University sinologist Ezra Vogel as "a touching, well-written, well-researched account of the life and times of a missionary who died in China in 1951 after 34 years there, by his daughter. Objective, nuanced, broad-gauged" Naifeh's 2016 book, Foreign Service, chronicles her family's life in the U.S. diplomatic corps during the 1950s, 1960s and 1970s. Also in 2016, she published Finding my Mother: The Red Box, a memoir of her mother.

== Early life ==
Naifeh was born to missionary parents in Wuhu, China, in 1928. Her father, B. W. Lanphear (1886-1951), was headmaster of the St. James Middle School in Wuhu, China. Her mother, Carolyn March (1889-1928), worked in the YWCA in Tianjin, China. Naifeh's mother died soon after giving birth to her daughter, who was subsequently raised by two servants in her missionary household.

Although Naifeh had no biological siblings, her father unofficially adopted 16 Chinese children who were orphans or otherwise abandoned, and she grew up with four of them – George, William, Jimmie and Stephen – whom Naifeh considered to be like brothers to her. Naifeh's first language was Chinese; at age three, she is said to have told her father, in Chinese, “Foreign Devil, leave my land!” Naifeh's father sent her to Worcester, Massachusetts, where she was raised by relatives and where she learned English and, eventually, Spanish, French, Russian and Arabic.

Naifeh spent her youth shuffling between boarding schools in China – the American schools in Nanking, Guling and Shanghai – and Worcester. She graduated from Classical High School in Worcester in 1945 and entered Wheaton College the following year.

Naifeh participated in the first year of the Smith Junior Year Abroad Program, spending a year in Puebla and in Mexico City, where she attended the Colegio de Mexico. She entered the Paul H. Nitze School of Advanced International Studies at Johns Hopkins University in 1949 to study International Economics, graduating with a master's degree in 1950.

On February 3, 1951, Naifeh married fellow-SAIS student George Naifeh, and soon thereafter the couple moved to their first diplomatic post in Meshed, Iran.

== Career ==
=== Teaching career ===
Naifeh’s father told her from an early age that he wanted her to become a teacher, advice which she was initially determined to ignore. Nevertheless, Naifeh enjoyed a productive career teaching in several different kinds of schools, across four continents, throughout more than six decades.

Naifeh taught English and English Literature at the university level at the University of Tulsa, the University of Benghazi, Georgetown University, Paul H. Nitze School of Advanced International Studies at Johns Hopkins University in Washington, D.C., and the Second Foreign Language Institute in Beijing.

Naifeh homeschooled her two young children in a one-room school house in Baida, Libya, and taught high-school English Literature at a public school in Silver Spring, Maryland, as well as English and English Literature at the Umm Ammar Girls’ Secondary School in Abu Dhabi, UAE. She taught literacy classes in Lagos, Nigeria, and writing in a GED program in Gloverville, South Carolina.

Years	School	Location
1961-1962	University of Tulsa	Tulsa, Oklahoma
1963-1965	Baida American School	Baida, Libya
1965-1967	University of Benghazi	Benghazi, Libya
1967	Silver Spring High School	Silver Spring, Maryland
1968	English Literacy Program	Lagos, Nigeria
1976-1978	Umm Ammar Girls’ Secondary School	Abu Dhabi, UAE
1979-1985	Georgetown University Language Institute	Washington, D.C.
1980	Second Foreign Language Institute	Beijing, China
1982-1984	Johns Hopkins School of Advanced International Studies	Washington, D.C.
2007-2010	General Education Degree Program, Sisters of the Valley	Gloverville, South Carolina

=== Foreign postings ===
In Meshed, Iran, Naifeh worked as assistant to the American consul. All Americans were ordered to leave the city in 1952, due to the political turmoil that resulted a year later in the overthrow of Prime Minister Mohammad Mossadegh. Marion and George Naifeh moved to the capital city of Tehran, where she worked in the visa section and he served as the radio officer. Before Mossadegh was ultimately overthrown, the Naifehs left for Baghdad, Iraq, where they served in The American Friends of the Middle East, an organization founded by journalist Dorothy Thompson.

The Naifehs returned to the United States in 1956, re-entering private life and briefly running a beverage company in Tulsa, Oklahoma. They returned to the Foreign Service in 1961, moving to Baida, a new capital of Libya, and the smallest U.S. embassy in the world at the time. Naifeh's husband served as public affairs officer, both in Baida and eventually in the nearby city of Benghazi.

From Benghazi, the Naifehs were assigned to the Nigerian capital of Lagos, where George served as cultural affairs officer. They moved again, to the American consulate in Karachi, Pakistan, where he also served as cultural affairs officer.

After a year spent in Minneapolis, Minnesota, where George served as diplomat in residence at the University of Minnesota, the Naifehs went abroad again 1974 to Abu Dhabi, capital of the United Arab Emirates, where he served as public affairs officer. Four years later they moved to their last post, Amman, Jordan, not far from Ajlun, the Jordanian town where Naifeh’s father-in-law was born, before emigrating to the United States at age 10.

== Married life ==
Marion and George Naifeh had one child, the author and entrepreneur Steven Naifeh (b. 1952), while living in Tehran, Iran, but lost their second child, Roger (1954), in Baghdad. Marion almost died after the child was stillborn, so she went to Tulsa, Oklahoma, to await the birth of their third child, Carolyn (b. 1956), who would later cofound Our Place Nashville, a community for adults with developmental disabilities.

Naifeh was accustomed to a tumultuous life marked by frequent moves. In addition to leaving Meshed in 1952 due to political strife, Naifeh had been evacuated earlier from China in 1941 due to the Sino-Japanese War, be evacuated along with her husband and daughter from Libya during the Six-Day War of 1967, and finally from Pakistan during the Pakistan-India War of 1971.

Marion and George Naifeh returned to the United States for good in 1980, moving to Washington, D.C., where George cofounded the American-Arab Affairs Council, later renamed the Middle East Policy Council. The couple retired to Aiken, South Carolina, in 1998. George Naifeh died in 2006, at the age of 82.

Marion Naifeh died at her son's home in Aiken, South Carolina on May 20, 2023, at the age of 95.

== Dates of residence ==
Years	Location
1928-1931	Wuhu, China
1931-1935	Worcester, Massachusetts
1935	Nanjing, China
1936-1938	Guling, China
1938-1941	Shanghai, China
1941-1945	Worcester, Massachusetts
1945-1947	Norton, Massachusetts
1947-1948	Mexico City, Mexico
1948-1949	Norton, Massachusetts
1950-1951	Washington, D.C.
1951-1952	Meshed, Iran
1952-1953	Tehran, Iran
1953-1956	Baghdad, Iraq
1956	Springfield, New Jersey
1957-1959	Chicago, Illinois
1959-1963	Tulsa, Oklahoma
1963-1965	Baida, Libya
1965-1967	Benghazi, Libya
1967-1968	Washington, D.C.
1968-1969	Lagos, Nigeria
1970-1972	Karachi, Pakistan
1972-1973	Minneapolis, Minnesota
1973-1974	Washington, D.C.
1974-1978	Abu Dhabi, UAE
1978-1979	Amman, Jordan
1980	Washington, D.C.
1980	Beijing, China
1980-1998	Washington, D.C.
1998–present	Aiken, South Carolina

== Bibliography ==
Published Works:

- “One-Room Schoolhouse,” Foreign Service Journal, 1964.
- The Last Missionary in China. Aiken, SC: Woodward/White, 2003.
- Foreign Service: A Memoir. Aiken, SC: Woodward/White, 2016.
- Finding My Mother: The Red Box. Aiken, SC: Woodward/White, 2016.
