= Ruth Kligman =

American painter (1930–2010)

- Ruth Kligman by Robert Mapplethorpe, 1972
- Born: January 25, 1930; Newark, New Jersey
- Died: March 1, 2010 (aged 80); New York, New York
- Education: Art Students League, New School for Social Research, New York University
- Known for: Painter
- Movement: Abstract

Ruth Kligman (January 25, 1930 – March 1, 2010) was an American abstract artist.

== Early life and education ==
Kligman was born to a Jewish family in Newark, New Jersey, with ancestors who had come from eastern Europe. Her father was Morris Kligman. Deciding at a young age that she wanted to be an artist, Kligman studied at the Art Students League after moving into New York, as well as the New School for Social Research and New York University.

== Career ==
=== Painting ===
Kligman was an abstract painter, working in New York City. Her works include Joan of Arc and the Light and Deman series. Kligman developed in several directions at different stages in her career, including iconography, gilding, curved canvases, bright primary shapes, and sunset-inspired gradations.

=== Writing ===
In 1974, Kligman published Love Affair: A Memoir of Jackson Pollock, about her relationship with Pollock.

== Personal life ==
Kligman was involved with Jackson Pollock in 1956 for a few months before his death. She was 26 and he was 44 when they met at a gallery where she was working. He was struggling with alcoholism. On August 11, 1956, Pollock had been drinking all day before speeding and losing control of the car in which they and Edith Metzger were traveling. Pollock and Metzger died in the crash. Kligman was thrown free and suffered serious injuries. She then became involved for several years, from about 1957 to 1961, with the artist Willem de Kooning. De Kooning named a painting, Ruth's Zowie, for Kligman's exclamation at seeing it.

Artists and photographers featured her in their work, including Irving Penn, Marisol, and Robert Mapplethorpe. She said that she and Andy Warhol had a crush on each other for years. Friendly with Jasper Johns, she continued with her own painting and long shared a studio with Franz Kline on 14th Street in New York. Another source reports she moved into Kline's studio after his death in 1962.

Kligman was married to artist Carlos Sansegundo from the mid-1960s until the late 1970s.

== In popular culture ==
In the biographical film Pollock (2000), Ed Harris starred as Pollock, and Jennifer Connelly portrayed Kligman.

== Bibliography ==
- Kligman, Ruth (1974). Love Affair: A Memoir of Jackson Pollock. New York City: William Morrow and Company. ISBN 978-0-688-00232-9.
