= Steven Naifeh =

American biographer and businessman

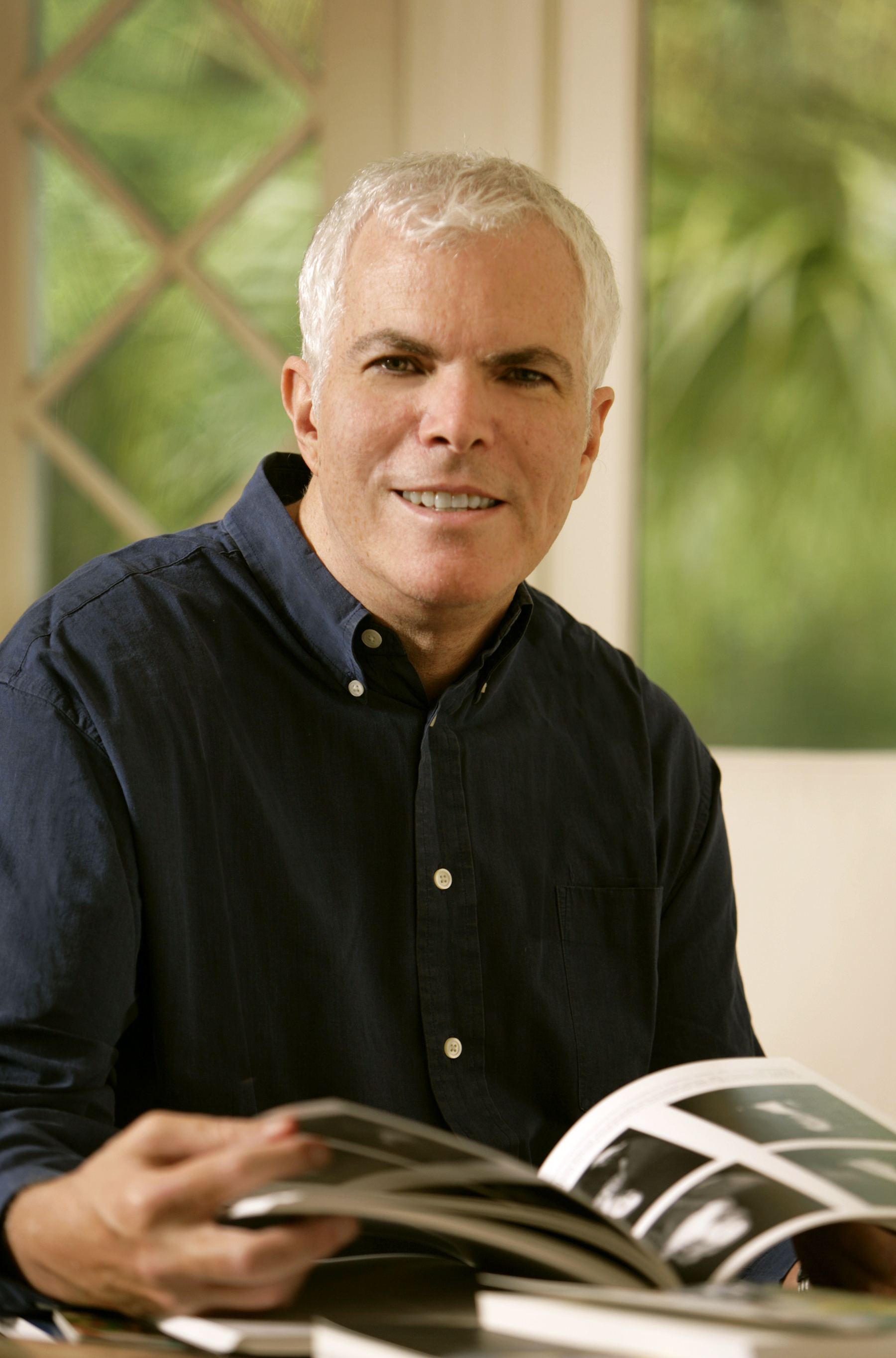
- Born: June 19, 1952 (age 74); Tehran, Iran
- Education: Princeton University; Harvard Law School; Harvard Graduate School of Fine Arts
- Occupation: Author
- Website: www.stevennaifeh.com; www.vangoghbiography.com; www.bestlawyers.com

Steven Naifeh (born June 19, 1952) is a Pulitzer Prize-winning American biographer of both Jackson Pollock and Vincent van Gogh. In addition to writing 18 books with Gregory White Smith, Naifeh is a businessman who founded several companies, including Best Lawyers, which spawned an industry of professional rankings.

He is also an artist whose geometric abstractions, many large in scale, have been exhibited widely throughout the world over a period of 45 years.

Jackson Pollock: An American Saga was published on December 24, 1989. The Philadelphia Inquirer called the book "Brilliant and definitive … so absorbing in its narrative drive and so exhaustively detailed that it makes everything that came before seem like trial balloons." Van Gogh: The Life, which Michiko Kakutani of The New York Times called "magisterial," was published in 2011 with a companion website hosting over 6,000 pages of notes.

His co-author, partner, and husband, Gregory White Smith, died in 2014 at the age of 62, having lived with a rare brain tumor for four decades.

== Personal life ==
Naifeh was born to U.S. diplomats George Naifeh and Marion Naifeh in Tehran, Iran, on June 19, 1952. His father is of Jordanian and Lebanese descent. In addition to several cities in the U.S., he lived with his parents during their postings in Baghdad, Iraq; Baida, Libya; Benghazi, Libya; Lagos, Nigeria; Karachi, Pakistan; Abu Dhabi, United Arab Emirates; Muscat, Oman; and Amman, Jordan.

He began painting at age ten in Libya, studying with a Dutch-born artist, Catharina Baart Stephan. He later studied, at age fifteen, with Bruce Onobrakpeya, one of the leading Nigerian artists of the twentieth century, who received the Living Human Treasure Award from UNSCO in 2006. Naifeh had exhibitions in both Kano and Kaduna, Nigeria, and in Karachi, Pakistan. In 1974, he had an exhibition at McCormick Hall, site of the Princeton University Art Museum, and, in 1975, he had an exhibition in Abu Dhabi, the first exhibition of art created there in the city's history. "An Exhibition in Abu Dhabi is a rare happening," Barbara Hughes wrote in the U.A.E. News. "But an exhibition of work mainly created in Abu Dhabi is probably unique."

Naifeh graduated summa cum laude from St. Andrew's School in Middletown, Delaware, in 1970. He then attended Princeton University and graduated summa cum laude with an A.B. in history in 1974 after completing a senior thesis titled "Culture Making: Money, Success and the New York Art World." He graduated from the Harvard Law School in 1977, and received a master's degree in fine arts, also from Harvard, in 1979. His undergraduate thesis on the New York Art World was published by Princeton University in 1976. and his Ph.D. dissertation on the artist Gene Davis was published in 1982.

Naifeh received honorary doctorates from the University of South Carolina Aiken in 1998 and the Juilliard School in 2012.

In 1989, along with Gregory White Smith, he purchased the Joye Cottage in Aiken, South Carolina in 1989. Together, they restored the historic Whitney-Vanderbilt house, a creation of both Stanford White and Carrère and Hastings. The story of that renovation is told in their book, On a Street Called Easy, In a Cottage Called Joye, which The New York Times called "wry and gentle … house-and-garden renovations gone delectably awry."

From 2009 until 2014, Naifeh served as co-chairman of Juilliard in Aiken Festival, an annual performing arts festival in Aiken. The 2014, Festival culminated in an early-music performance of Bach's St. Matthew Passion that was presented not only in Aiken but in Spivey Hall in Atlanta and Alice Tully Hall at Lincoln Center.

Naifeh married Gregory White Smith, his co-author and partner of 40 years, in 2011.

== Career ==
Naifeh worked as an intern in the office of Congressman Charlie Wilson, as a docent at the National Gallery of Art in Washington, D.C., and as an associate attorney at the law firm of Milbank Tweed.

He was the author—all, except for the first book, co-authored with Smith—of many books including five New York Times bestsellers.

He published Jackson Pollock: An American Saga in 1989, which won the 1991 Pulitzer Prize for Biography or Autobiography and was also a finalist for the National Book Award.

Interview Magazine said of the book, "For once, with this intense, engrossing, and indeed brilliant work, we have a biography that justifies its length. Seldom have the history of an artist, the development of his imagination, and the fevers of his soul been more grandly yet intimately described."

The book was adapted into an Academy Award-winning film by Ed Harris in 2000, Pollock. Harris said the biography was "the bible for the project and remained so until filming was completed." The biography also served as an inspiration for John Updike's Seek My Face. "It would be in vain," Updike wrote, "to deny that a large number of details come from the admirable, exhaustive 'Jackson Pollock: An American Saga.'"

Naifeh and Smith also wrote Van Gogh: The Life, which was called "the definitive work for decades to come" by Leo Jansen of the Van Gogh Museum, in 2011.

Time Magazine wrote: "Steven Naifeh and Gregory White Smith, whose 1989 biography of Jackson Pollock won the Pulitzer Prize, have written this generation's definitive portrait of the great Dutch post-Impressionist. … Their most important achievement is to produce a reckoning with van Gogh's occasional 'madness' that doesn't lose sight of the lucidity and intelligence – the profound sanity – of his art." The Boston Globe wrote: "Now, at last, with 'Van Gogh: The Life' by Steven Naifeh and Gregory White Smith, we have what could very well be the definitive biography … And how pleased we should be that Naifeh and Smith have rendered so exquisitely and respectfully van Gogh's short, intense, and wholly interesting life."

In addition to English, Van Gogh: The Life has been published in Chinese, Dutch, German, French, Japanese, Korean, Spanish, Polish, Portuguese, Russian, and Vietnamese.

Naifeh and Smith also wrote several how-to books to fund the writing of Pollock, including (with Michael Morgenstern), the best-seller How to Make Love to a Woman, which sold several million copies in 29 languages. They wrote three true crime books, including the bestseller The Mormon Murders in 1988 and Final Justice in 1993. The latter was nominated for the Edgar Allan Poe Award for Fact Crime.

Naifeh and Smith's one book of humor, detailing the renovation of Joye Cottage, was well-received: "Page after belly-ticking page," wrote The Washington Post. "Numerous adventures bordering on slapstick. … A delightful read."

Together with Smith, Naifeh founded the legal publishing company Best Lawyers in 1981 which published The Best Lawyers in America, a peer-review list, in 1983. That list went on to become Best Lawyers, a global network linking lawyers and clients. In 2013, Best Lawyers ranked 74,965 lawyers representing 18,034 law firms in 75 countries. In 2009, the company partnered with U.S. News to produce rankings of law firms and in 2014 it gave out 61,138 rankings to 11,681 law firms in 120 practice areas. Best Lawyers was acquired by Levine Leichtman Capital Partners in 2018.

Naifeh returned to painting and sculpting in 1998, creating works of geometric abstraction based on geometric formulas from medieval art from southern Spain to northern India but closely related to the works of such twentieth-century western masters as Frank Stella and Sol Lewitt. He has had numerous exhibitions, including one at the Columbia Museum of Art in the summer of 2013. Humanities Magazine noted that Naifeh's "tessellating works explore the threads weaving together traditional Islamic art and the Geometric Abstraction movement." The Free Times wrote that the exhibition offered "many rich ideas for exploration: formal beauty, the nature of abstraction, how art and math intersect, and insights into the cultural expressions of" the Middle East. "This is, simply, a very important exhibition that deserves much more attention."

Naifeh's partner Smith was diagnosed with a rare brain tumor in 1975, which led to 13 brain surgeries as well as radiation and nuclear medicine treatments and experimental chemotherapeutic regimens. His search for cutting-edge medical care was profiled on CBS's "60 Minutes" and recounted in their book Making Miracles Happen. With Smith, he also founded Best Doctors, a company dedicated to helping others with undiagnosed or seemingly untreatable medical illnesses find the best medicine anywhere in the world. Although they sold the company in 2000, it continues to serve more than 30 million members worldwide.

== Bibliography ==
- Culture Making. 1976.
- Moving Up in Style. 1980.
- Gene Davis. 1982.
- How to Make Love to a Woman. (With Michael Morgenstern). 1982.
- The Best Lawyers in America. 1983–2014.
- Why Can't Men Open Up?. 1984.
- Naifeh, Steven; Smith, Gregory White (2005) [1988]. The Mormon Murders. Macmillan. ISBN 0-312934-10-6.
- Jackson Pollock: An American Saga. 1989. OCLC 18907042.
- Final Justice. 1993.
- A Stranger in the Family. 1996.
- The Best Doctors in America. 1992–1997.
- On a Street Called Easy, In a Cottage Called Joye. 1996.
- Making Miracles Happen. 1997.
- Van Gogh: The Life. 2011.
- Van Gogh and the Artists He Loved. 2021.
