= List of awards and nominations received by Marcia Gay Harden =

Marcia Gay Harden awards and nominations
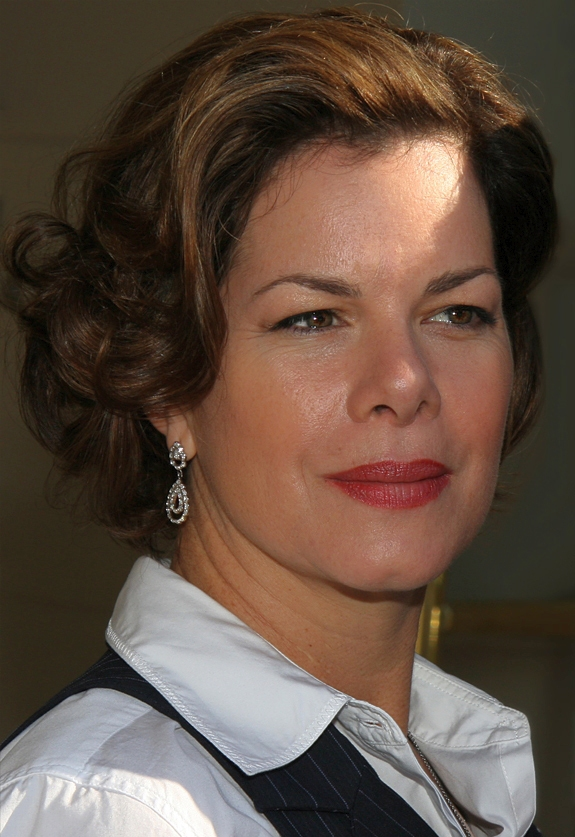
- Harden at the 2007 Toronto International Film Festival
Awards and nominations
Award	Wins	Nominations
Academy Awards	1	2
Actor Awards	0	2
Primetime Emmy Awards	0	4
Tony Awards	1	2

Totals (Note: Certain award groups do not simply award one winner. They acknowledge several different recipients, have runners-up, and have third place. Since this is a specific recognition and is different from losing an award, runner-up mentions are considered wins in this award tally. For simplification and to avoid errors, each award in this list has been presumed to have had a prior nomination.)
- Wins: 11
- Nominations: 40

Marcia Gay Harden is an American actress who has received numerous accolades throughout her career, including an Academy Award, a Tony Award, and four nominations at the Primetime Emmy Awards.

Her performance as artist Lee Krasner in the 2000 film Pollock received critical acclaim, earning her the Academy Award for Best Supporting Actress. In 2003, she starred in the Clint Eastwood-directed thriller Mystic River as Celeste, a woman who suspects her husband of being a murderer. For this film, she was nominated for a second Academy Award, an Actor Award, and a Critics' Choice Award. Her other notable film roles include American Gun (2005), that earned her a nomination for the Independent Spirit Award for Best Supporting Female, and 2007's The Mist and Into the Wild, winning a Saturn Award for Best Supporting Actress for the former and being nominated for an Actor Award for Outstanding Performance by a Cast in a Motion Picture for the latter.

Harden made her Broadway debut in 1993, starring in Angels in America, for which she was nominated for a Tony Award for Best Featured Actress in a Play. She returned to the stage in 2009 as Veronica in God of Carnage. Her performance won her the Tony Award for Best Actress in a Play. Her television appearances include a supporting role in The Courageous Heart of Irena Sendler (2009), for which she was nominated for a Primetime Emmy Award for Outstanding Supporting Actress in a Limited Series or Movie, and guest roles in the series Law & Order (2005–2013) and The Morning Show (2019–present), receiving additional Emmy nominations for Outstanding Guest Actress in a Drama Series.

== Awards and nominations ==
Awards and nominations received by Marcia Gay Harden
Award	Year	Work	Category	Result	Ref.
Academy Awards	2001	Pollock	Best Supporting Actress	Won	
Academy Awards	2004	Mystic River	Best Supporting Actress	Nominated	
Actor Awards	2004	Mystic River	Outstanding Performance by a Cast in a Motion Picture (Note: shared with Kevin Bacon, Laurence Fishburne, Laura Linney, Sean Penn, and Tim Robbins)	Nominated	
Actor Awards	2008	Into the Wild	Outstanding Performance by a Cast in a Motion Picture (Note: shared with Brian H. Dierker, Emile Hirsch, Hal Holbrook, William Hurt, Catherine Keener, Jena Malone, Kristen Stewart, and Vince Vaughn)	Nominated	
AARP Movies for Grownups Awards	2010	Whip It	Best Supporting Actress	Nominated	
AARP Movies for Grownups Awards	2010	Whip It	Best Grownup Love Story (Note: shared with Daniel Stern)	Nominated	
Astra TV Awards	2023	So Help Me Todd	Best Actress in a Broadcast Network or Cable Comedy Series	Nominated	
Boston Society of Film Critics Awards	2003	Mystic River	Best Ensemble Cast	Won	
Chicago Film Critics Association Awards	1992	Used People	Best Supporting Actress	Nominated	
Chicago Film Critics Association Awards	2004	Mystic River	Best Supporting Actress	Nominated	
Critics' Choice Awards	2004	Mystic River	Best Supporting Actress	Nominated	
Critics' Choice Awards	2023	Uncoupled	Best Supporting Actress in a Comedy Series	Nominated	
Dallas–Fort Worth Film Critics Association Awards	2004	Mystic River	Best Supporting Actress	Nominated	
Drama Desk Awards	1993	Angels in America: Millennium Approaches	Outstanding Featured Actress in a Play	Nominated	
Drama Desk Awards	1994	Angels in America: Perestroika	Outstanding Featured Actress in a Play	Nominated	
Drama Desk Awards	2009	God of Carnage	Outstanding Actress in a Play	Nominated	
Film Independent Spirit Awards	2001	Pollock	Best Supporting Female	Nominated	
Film Independent Spirit Awards	2007	American Gun	Best Supporting Female	Nominated	
Golden Nymph Awards	2016	Code Black	Best Actress in a TV Series	Won	
Golden Raspberry Awards	2019	Fifty Shades Freed	Worst Supporting Actress	Nominated	
Golden Schmoes Awards	2003	Mystic River	Best Supporting Actress	Nominated	
Las Vegas Film Critics Society Awards	2004	Mystic River	Best Supporting Actress	Nominated	
National Board of Review Awards	1997	The First Wives Club	Best Acting by an Ensemble (Note: shared with Elizabeth Berkley, Philip Bosco, Stockard Channing, Stephen Collins, Jennifer Dundas, Victor Garber, Ari Greenberg, Goldie Hawn, Eileen Heckart, Dan Hedaya, Diane Keaton, Aida Linares, Bette Midler, James Naughton, Sarah Jessica Parker, Bronson Pinchot, Rob Reiner, and Maggie Smith)	Won	
National Society of Film Critics Awards	2001	Pollock	Best Supporting Actress	Nominated	
New York Film Critics Circle Awards	2001	Pollock	Best Supporting Actress	Won	
Outer Critics Circle Awards	2009	God of Carnage	Outstanding Actress in a Play	Won	
People's Choice Awards	2016	Code Black	Favorite Actress in a New TV Series	Nominated	
Primetime Emmy Awards	2007	Law & Order: Special Victims Unit	Outstanding Guest Actress in a Drama Series	Nominated	
Primetime Emmy Awards	2009	The Courageous Heart of Irena Sendler	Outstanding Supporting Actress in a Miniseries or Movie	Nominated	
Primetime Emmy Awards	2022	The Morning Show (episode: "Testimony")	Outstanding Guest Actress in a Drama Series	Nominated	
Primetime Emmy Awards	2024	The Morning Show (episode: "Update Your Priors")	Outstanding Guest Actress in a Drama Series	Nominated	
Provincetown International Film Festival Awards	2002	Herself	Excellence in Acting	Won	
Satellite Awards	2003	King of Texas	Best Actress – Miniseries or Television Film	Nominated	
Satellite Awards	2004	Mystic River	Best Supporting Actress – Motion Picture	Nominated	
Saturn Awards	2008	The Mist	Best Supporting Actress	Won	
Theatre World Awards	1993	Angels in America: Millennium Approaches	Outstanding Broadway or Off-Broadway Debut	Won	
Tony Awards	1993	Angels in America: Millennium Approaches	Best Featured Actress in a Play	Nominated	
Tony Awards	2009	God of Carnage	Best Actress in a Play	Won	
Women's Image Network Awards	2009	The Courageous Heart of Irena Sendler	Outstanding Actress in a Mini-Series / Made for Television Movie	Won	
Women's Image Network Awards	2020	Love You to Death	Outstanding Actress in a Mini-Series / Made for Television Movie	Nominated	
Women's Image Network Awards	2021	Barkskins (episode: "Buttermilk")	Outstanding Actress in a Mini-Series / Made for Television Movie	Nominated	
