= Airtight (disambiguation) =

Airtight means impermeable to air or other gases.

Airtight may also refer to:

- Vacuum packing, a method of packaging that removes air from the package prior to sealing
- Airtight (film), a 2014 American thriller film
- Airtight (G.I. Joe), a fictional character
- Airtight Bridge in Coles County, Illinois
- Airtight Games, an American video game developer
