= Aija Tērauda =

Latvian model, actress and film producer

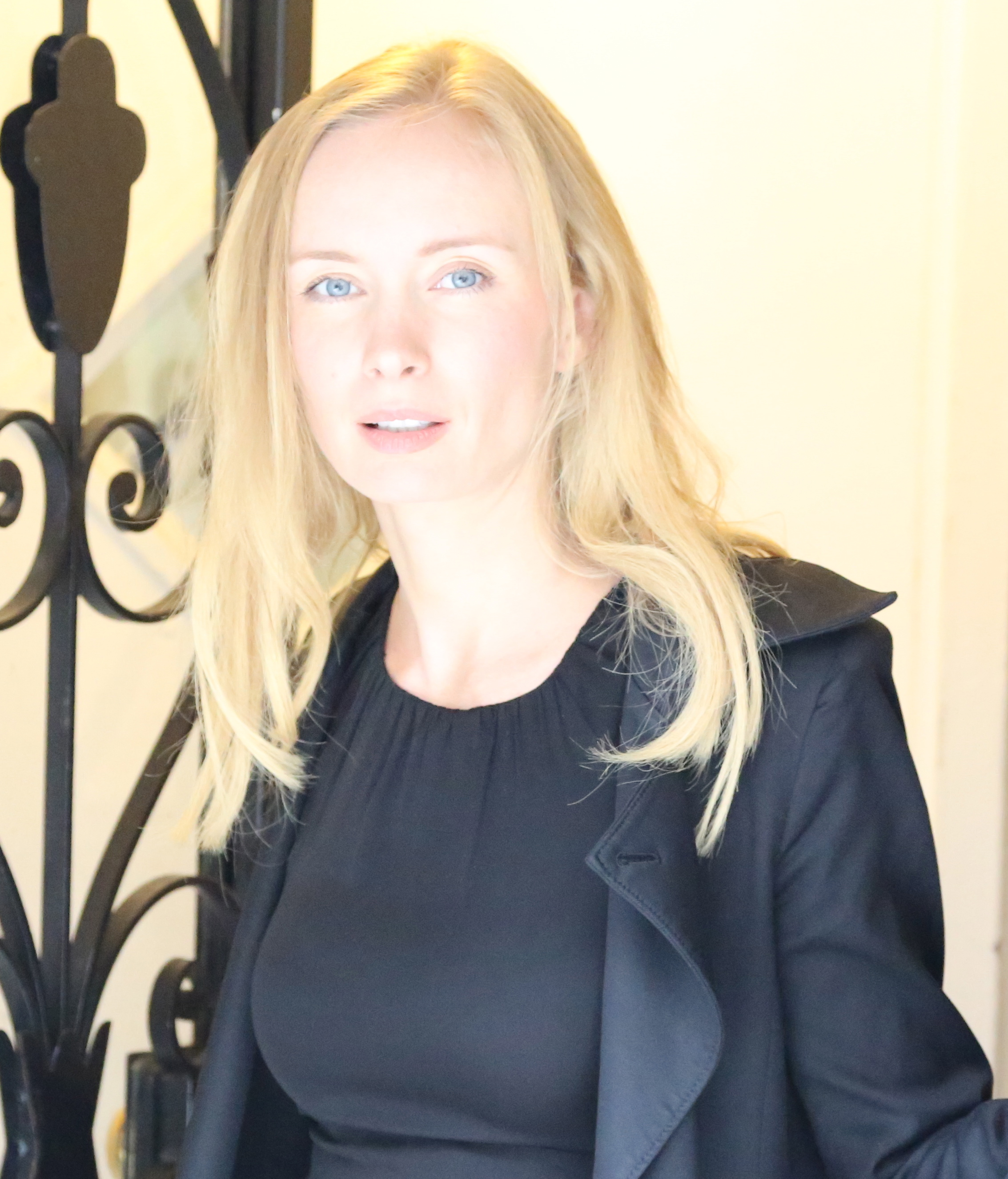
- Terauda in New York City October 2012
- Born: Riga, Latvia
- Occupations: model, actress, film producer
- Years active: 2007–present
- Spouse: Derek Estlin Purvis
- Website: aijaterauda.com

Aija Tērauda (born December 28) is a Latvian model, actress and film producer.

== Early life ==
Aija Tērauda was born in Riga, Latvia. She began her modeling career at the age of 16, working for modeling agency Natalie, which led her to work in Milan, Italy and New York City. Tērauda is fluent in Latvian, Russian and English. She also learned Italian and Finnish while living and working in those countries. After living in Europe, Tērauda moved to New York City to study acting at HB Studio and MTB Studio. She obtained a Bachelor of Arts in Economics and International Studies at the City College of New York and studied at Columbia University.

== Career ==
Tērauda landed her first role playing a model in Spider-Man 3. She appears in Martin Scorsese's television series Boardwalk Empire. Tērauda also worked in Riga, Latvia with Hallmark Productions in the television film The Courageous Heart of Irena Sendler directed by John Kent Harrison. She plays a leading role in the Derek Estlin Purvis film Airtight, which she also produced. Tērauda has been cover model for many European and American magazines including Talent in Motion (November 2011) and Millennium Magazine (March 2012).

== Personal life ==
Tērauda married Derek Estlin Purvis on December 13, 2013. The couple has one child.

== Filmography ==
Film
Year	Film
2007	Spider-Man 3
2007	American Gangster
2008	Shine a Light
2009	The Courageous Heart of Irena Sendler
2010	Boardwalk Empire
2012	Pull The Trigger
2012	Beautiful Women Wake Up Early
2012	J-1
2013	Airtight
2014	Architect of Chaos
2014	The Knick
2014	Driving While Black
