= Howard Behrens =

American painter

- Born: August 20, 1933; Chicago, Illinois
- Died: April 14, 2014 (aged 80)
- Occupation: Artist

Howard Chesner Behrens (August 20, 1933 – April 14, 2014) was an American popular artist. His works of art are sold in fine art galleries, at auction on cruise ships, and at Costco.

== Biography ==
Behrens was born in Chicago, Illinois, in 1933. He grew up near Washington, D.C. His formal education in art was at the University of Maryland, College Park, where he earned a master's degree in painting and sculpture. Behrens was hired by the United States Government Printing Office, where his father was employed as a printer, and worked there for the next seventeen years. Behrens resided in Potomac, Maryland, and died on April 14, 2014, after a long battle with Parkinson's disease.

== Artistic approach ==
Behren's style developed over time, and he spoke of painting becoming its own subject matter: "I slowly started using the palette knife to paint on canvas," said Behrens. "It started out very fine and thin using very little paint. Then, it got thicker and thicker and heavier and heavier. Finally, the most amazing thing happened - the act of painting became the subject matter." Behrens also developed a method for creation that combined travel, sketching, fine art photography and painting. Creation of paintings that integrate what he calls "big, juicy chunks of paint."

== Critique ==
According to Suzaan Boettger, Howard Behrens has been "overlooked by art professionals" with justification. Behrens caters to "shopping-mall customers." His work is what some have called "Impressionistism" or "paintings that are chronologically 'contemporary' but stylistically faux historical."

His proponents have claimed that "Behrens is considered by critics and connoisseurs alike as 'the one, the only, the master' of the palette knife and, as a matter of fact, Howard Behrens, through his work, lives up to the appellation."

"Howard is the best colorist among a large group of post-Impressionist painters in the U.S. today," shared Harriet Rinehart, founder of Rinehart Fine Arts, a gallery selling Behrens' work. "Although many people try to imitate him, they always come up second best," "There are many who have tried to imitate his style, but no one has come close," added Josh Miller of Ocean Galleries in Stone Harbor and Avalon, New Jersey. "There are different people trying to do what he does, but they just don't pull it off," agreed Rick Moore of Rick Moore Fine Art in Naples, Florida."

== Awards and associations ==
He was selected along with fellow artists Simon Bull and Thomas Kinkade to commemorate the 2002 Salt Lake City Winter Olympics.
