= Christmas Cottage =

- Directed by: Michael Campus
- Written by: Ken LaZebnik
- Produced by: Michael Campus; Arla Dietz Campus; Nanette Kinkade; Thomas Kinkade; Julie Yorn
- Starring: Jared Padalecki; Marcia Gay Harden; Peter O'Toole; Aaron Ashmore; Geoffrey Lewis; Chris Elliott; Charlotte Rae; Edward Asner
- Cinematography: Robert Brinkmann
- Edited by: Don Brochu
- Music by: Aaron Zigman
- Production companies: Sterling Media; Radiant Productions; Birch Grove Films; Firm Films
- Distributed by: Lionsgate
- Release date: November 11, 2008
- Running time: 96 minutes
- Country: United States
- Language: English
- Box office: $41,724

Thomas Kinkade's Christmas Cottage is a 2008 Christmas biopic directed by Michael Campus, the first film he directed after a lapse of more than 30 years. It stars Jared Padalecki as painter Thomas Kinkade and features Peter O'Toole, Marcia Gay Harden and Aaron Ashmore.

The film was originally intended for release theatrically in 2007, but due to final edits and music rights its release was delayed until the following year. The film's official painting was created throughout 2007, alongside the film's production. The film was eventually released direct to video in the United States on November 11, 2008.

== Plot ==
In 1977, Thomas Kinkade (Jared Padalecki, dressed in an assortment of knitted accessories), a fine arts student at UC Berkeley, leaves his girlfriend (and semi-nude model), Hope Eastbrook (Gina Holden), to go home to Placerville, California for Christmas break. With his brother Pat (Aaron Ashmore), he drives home on a motorcycle with a sidecar that serves as the only operational family vehicle for the duration of the story.

When they arrive at the family home—a charming but ramshackle yellow cottage—they find out that their mother, Maryanne (Marcia Gay Harden), is facing foreclosure of the family home. If she doesn’t come up with more than $3000 by New Years’ Day, this will be the last family Christmas in Placerville.

To her sons’ chagrin, she stoically insists that she doesn’t want to burden them with her troubles. Knowing there’s no way they can raise all of the money, the boys nonetheless seek out Christmas-break jobs. Tom lines up a job for $500 to finish painting a mural of Placerville to coincide with the tree-lighting ceremony where Ernie (Chris Elliott, wearing a dark, curly wig) plans to boost tourism by declaring Placerville the “Christmas Tree Capital of America.”

Initially, Tom thinks the mural is beneath him, but soon he’s inspired to include many of the quirky townspeople who make up the fabric of the town, including:

- Butch (Geoffrey Lewis), whom Maryanne comforts at the graveside of his son, a Vietnam war casualty
- Tanya (Kiersten Warren), a local sex-pot who sees the Christmas-tree lighting ceremony as an opportunity to raise her profile
- Mr. Rosa (Jay Brazeau), the socially awkward, gossipy neighbor, and his dog Jupiter
- Vesta (Charlotte Rae), the stubborn church organist
- Nanette (Tegan Moss), Tom’s ex-girlfriend, for whom Tom still carries a flame, despite being in a relationship with Hope

Tom visits his mentor, the painter Glen Wesman (Peter O’Toole), who is in declining health and hasn’t been able to paint because his hands don’t work the way they used to. He inspires Tom to take even this meaningless mural seriously. Glen is full of wise pronouncements and tells Tom, “[Art] can introduce men to their souls.”

Tom calls Glen’s San Francisco art dealer Sidney (Ed Asner) to see if there’s still a market for Glen’s paintings, but also to ask if he could sell any of his own paintings. Sidney tells him his work isn’t anything special—yet.

Tom’s brother, Pat, helps cranky neighbor Big Jim (Richard Moll) with his over-the-top Christmas display. Big Jim has an unfriendly rivalry with his neighbors over who has the most extravagant decorations. Unfortunately, Big Jim’s enthusiasm for electricity doesn’t match his skill with wiring.

Desperate to save the family home, Tom calls his father, Bill (Richard Burgi), to invite him to Placerville for Christmas. Although he abandoned the family many years earlier, he arrives in time to disappoint: he doesn’t have any money to offer and spends his time drinking, smoking, and scheming.

Tom discovers that Maryanne was laid off from the insurance company months earlier, which explains her current financial predicament. Although she continues to look for a job, Placerville isn’t exactly bustling, which is why so much rests on boosting tourism. She spends her time caring for other people, but she herself has too much pride to take charity.

Tom’s “big city” girlfriend, Hope, comes to visit and is dismissive of his mural and the small town. The town makes a bad first impression when the tree-lighting ceremony goes badly: Big Jim’s lights short out and explode in a comical fashion.

When they attend the Christmas pageant together, it’s a disaster on multiple levels: the scenery that Tom painted melts under the lights, and Hope leaves in a huff because Tom won’t go back to Berkeley with her. The silver lining is Tom’s father finally steps up and defends him against the criticism of the audience.

After the pageant, the townspeople come out of the church and, one by one, they are drawn to the mural, uplifted by Tom’s vision.

However, still feeling low after the pageant disaster, Tom visits his mentor Glen. It’s hard watching someone he loves fade away. He begs Glen to paint again and not to give up. The outpouring of emotion is what Glen needs to get up and paint again.

For Christmas, the boys give their mother the money they scraped together, which will at least give her a new start. Their celebration is interrupted when the townspeople all come to help Maryanne fix up the house, which, considering the impending foreclosure, is at least a touching gesture for someone who always gives and never receives.

Meanwhile, Glen motivates to produce one final painting. Enduring an arduous walk through the snow, Glen delivers the painting to Maryanne so she can sell it to save the house. Instead of Nicole, his long lost love, he paints the light through the leaves and tells Tom to “Paint the light.” Glen dies the next day.

Maryanne sells Glen’s painting, which, along with a new job, saves the house and sets her up for life.

At the end, the real Thomas Kinkade appears painting one of his signature works of the Christmas Cottage.

== Cast ==
- Jared Padalecki as Thomas Kinkade
- Aaron Ashmore as Pat Kinkade, Thomas's brother
- Marcia Gay Harden as MaryAnne Kinkade, Thomas's mother
- Richard Burgi as Bill Kinkade
- Peter O'Toole as Glen Wesman based on Glenn Wessels
- Kiersten Warren as Tanya Kapinski, Miss Placerville (1974)
- Gina Holden as Hope Eastbrook
- Chris Elliott as Ernie Trevor
- Tegan Moss as Nanette
- Chelan Simmons as Miss Placerville (1977)
- Jay Brazeau as Mr. Rosa
- Geoffrey Lewis as Butch Conran
- Malcolm Stewart as Lloyd Gunderson
- Gabrielle Rose as Evelyn Gunderson
- Richard Moll as Big Jim
- Charlotte Rae as Vesta Furniss
- Chang Tseng as Mr. Chang
- Nancy Robertson as Deputy Hornbuckle
- Edward Asner as Sidney

== See also ==
- List of Christmas films
