= Painter of Light =

Painter of Light may refer to:

- J. M. W. Turner (1775–1851), British landscape artist commonly known as "The Painter of Light"
- Thomas Kinkade (1958–2012), American landscape artist who trademarked the term in reference to himself
