= Thomas Kinkade =

American painter (1958–2012)

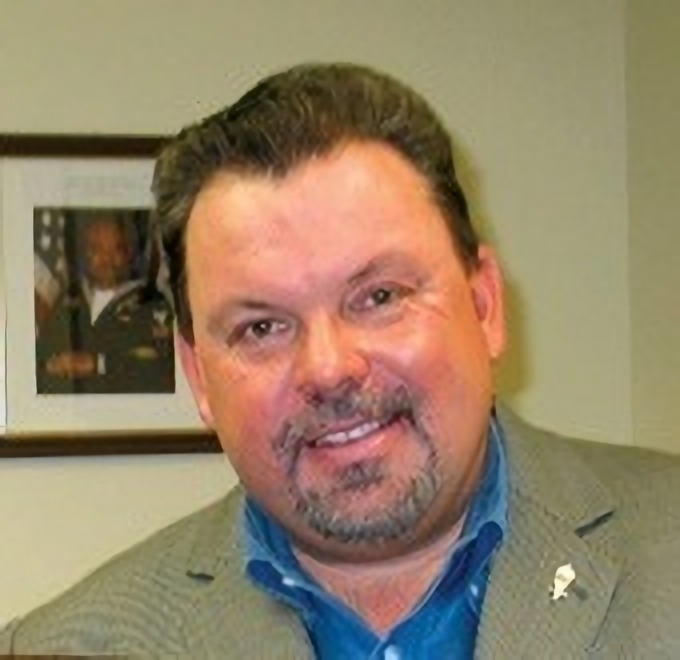
- Kinkade in 2005
- Born: William Thomas Kinkade III; January 19, 1958; Sacramento, California, U.S.
- Died: April 6, 2012 (aged 54); Monte Sereno, California, U.S.
- Education: ArtCenter College of Design, Pasadena
- Known for: Painting
- Spouse: Nanette Willey (m. 1982)
- Children: 4

William Thomas Kinkade III (January 19, 1958 – April 6, 2012) was an American painter of popular realistic, pastoral, and idyllic subjects. He is notable for achieving success during his lifetime with the mass marketing of his work as printed reproductions and other licensed products by means of the Thomas Kinkade Company. According to Kinkade's company, at one point one in every 20 American homes owned a copy of one of his paintings.

Kinkade described himself as a "Painter of Light," a phrase he protected by trademark. He was criticized for some of his behavior and business practices; art critics faulted his work for being kitschy. Kinkade died as a result of acute intoxication from alcohol and diazepam at the age of 54. Reportedly, about 600 of his 6,000 unpublished works have been published posthumously.

== Early life ==
William Thomas Kinkade was born in 1958 in Sacramento County, California. He grew up in the town of Placerville with a single mother. She was so poor that they often could not afford heating or lighting. He graduated from El Dorado High School in Placerville in 1976, and attended the University of California, Berkeley and ArtCenter College of Design in Pasadena.

Some of the people who mentored and taught Kinkade prior to college included Charles Bell and Glenn Wessels. Wessels encouraged Kinkade to go to University of California, Berkeley. Kinkade's relationship with Wessels is the subject of a semi-biographical movie released during 2008, Christmas Cottage. After two years of general education at Berkeley, Kinkade transferred to ArtCenter College of Design.

== Career ==
For the summer of June 1980, Kinkade traveled across the United States with his college friend James Gurney. The two finished their journey in New York and secured a contract with Guptill Publications to produce a sketching handbook. In 1982, they produced a book, The Artist's Guide to Sketching, which was one of Guptill Publications' best-sellers that year.

The success of the book resulted in both working for Ralph Bakshi Studios where they created background art for the animated feature movie Fire and Ice (1983). While working on the film, Kinkade began to explore the depiction of light and of imagined worlds. After that, Kinkade worked as a painter, selling his originals in galleries throughout California.

=== Artistic themes and style ===
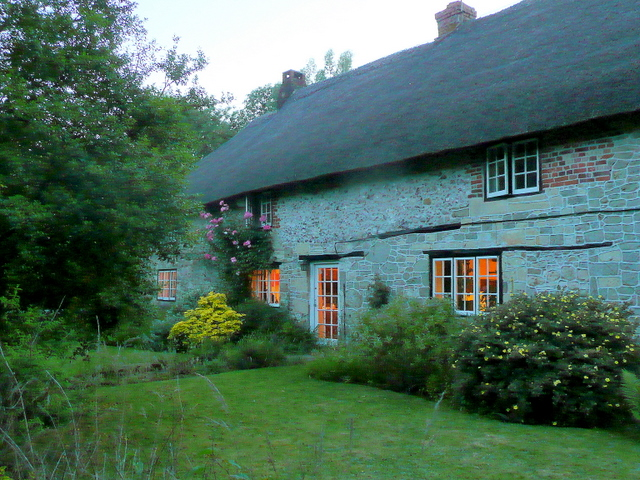
Kinkade's cottage and garden scenes drew inspiration from the Cotswolds region of England.

Recurring features of Kinkade's paintings are pastel colors and brilliant illumination of the scene. Rendered with idealistic values of American scene painting, his works often portray bucolic and idyllic settings including gardens, streams, stone cottages, lighthouses, and Main Streets. His hometown of Placerville (where his works are much displayed) was the inspiration for many of his street and snow scenes. He also depicted various Christian themes, including the cross and churches. His country scenes rarely depict people and he was frequently asked questions about that.

Kinkade said he was emphasizing the value of simple pleasures and his intent was to communicate inspirational messages through his paintings. A self-described "devout Christian" (even giving all four of his children the middle name "Christian"), he believed that he gained inspiration from his religious beliefs and his work was intended to include a moral dimension. Many pictures include specific chapter-and-verse allusions to Bible passages.

In 2009, he painted a portrait of the Indianapolis Motor Speedway for the cover of that year's race program which included details in the crowd, hiding among them the figures of Norman Rockwell and Dale Earnhardt. He also painted the farewell portrait for Yankee Stadium. Concerning the Indianapolis Motor Speedway painting, Kinkade said:

The passion I have is to capture memories, to evoke the emotional connection we have to an experience. I came out here and stood up on the bleachers and looked around, and I saw all the elements of the track. It was empty at the time. But I saw the stadium, how the track laid out, the horizon, the skyline of Indianapolis and the Pagoda. I saw it all in my imagination. I began thinking, 'I want to get this energy—what I call the excitement of the moment—into this painting.' As I began working on it, I thought, 'Well you have this big piece of asphalt, the huge spectator stands; I've got to do something to get some movement.' So I just started throwing flags into it. It gives it kind of a patriotic excitement.

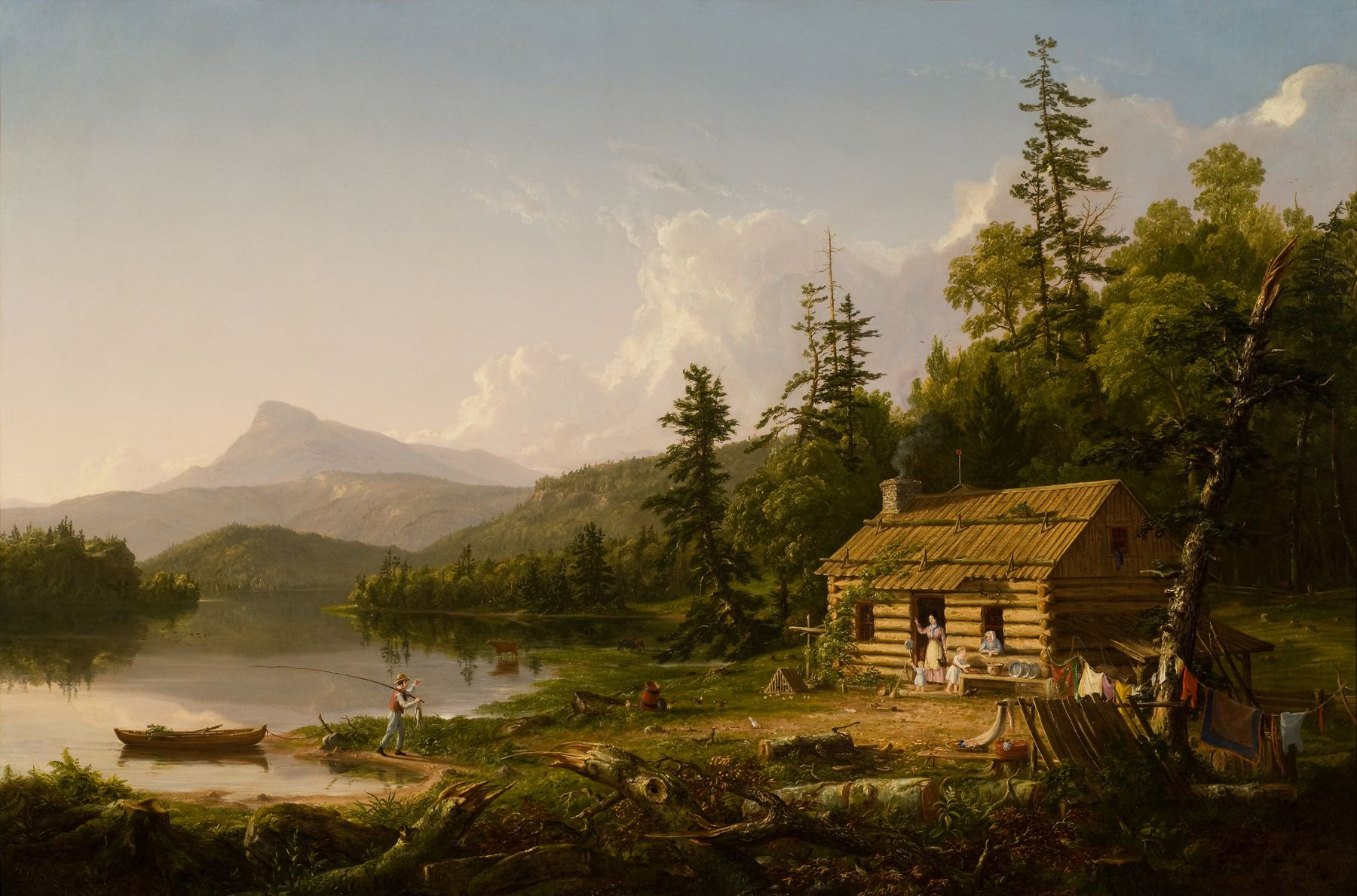
The Hudson River School has been recognized as a precedent for Kinkade's idyllic, sentimental scenes. (Thomas Cole, Home in the Woods, 1847)

Artist and Guggenheim Fellow Jeffrey Vallance has spoken about Kinkade's devout religious themes and their reception in the art world:

This is another area that the contemporary art world has a hard time with, that I find interesting. He expresses what he believes and puts that in his art. That is not the trend in the high-art world at the moment, the idea that you can express things spiritually and be taken seriously... It is always difficult to present serious religious ideas in an art context. That is why I like Kinkade. It is a difficult thing to do.

Essayist Joan Didion is a representative critic of Kinkade's style:

A Kinkade painting was typically rendered in slightly surreal pastels. It typically featured a cottage or a house of such insistent coziness as to seem actually sinister, suggestive of a trap designed to attract Hansel and Gretel. Every window was lit, to lurid effect, as if the interior of the structure might be on fire.

Didion compared the "Kinkade Glow" to the luminism of 19th-century painter Albert Bierstadt, who sentimentalized the infamous Donner Pass in his Donner Lake from the Summit. She saw "unsettling similarities" between the two painters and worried that Kinkade's treatment of the Sierra Nevada, The Mountains Declare His Glory, similarly ignored the tragedy of the forced dispersal of Yosemite's Sierra Miwok Indians during the Gold Rush, by including an imaginary Miwok camp as what he calls "an affirmation that man has his place, even in a setting touched by God's glory."

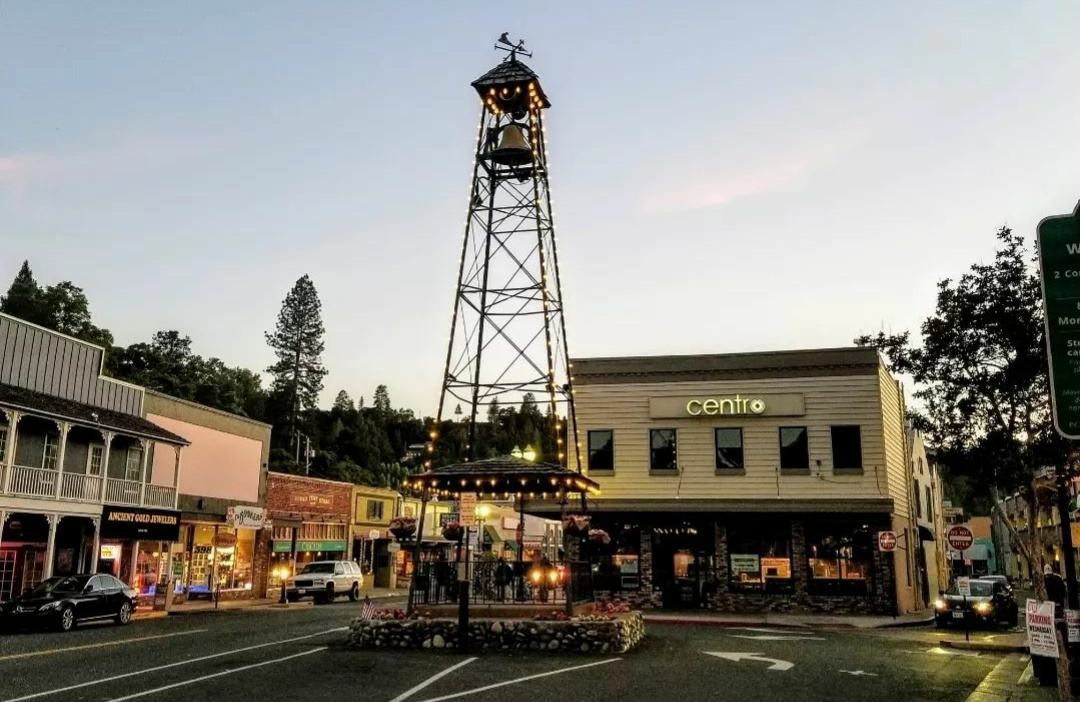
Kinkade's paintings of tight-knit communities appealed to Americans struggling with social fragmentation. Placerville, California is shown.

Mike McGee, director of the CSUF Grand Central Art Center at California State University, Fullerton, wrote of the Thomas Kinkade Heaven on Earth exhibition:

Looking just at the paintings themselves it is obvious that they are technically competent. Kinkade's genius, however, is in his capacity to identify and fulfill the needs and desires of his target audience—he cites his mother as a key influence and archetypal audience—and to couple this with savvy marketing... If Kinkade's art is principally about ideas, and I think it is, it could be suggested that he is a conceptual artist. All he would have to do to solidify this position would be to make an announcement that the beliefs he has expounded are just Duchampian posturing to achieve his successes. But this will never happen. Kinkade earnestly believes in his faith in God and his personal agenda as an artist.

=== Authenticity ===
Kinkade's production method has been described as being "a semi-industrial process in which low-level apprentices embellish a prefab base provided by Kinkade." He reportedly designed and painted all of his works, which were then moved into the next stage of the process of mass-producing prints. It is assumed he created most of the original, conceptual work that he produced. Kinkade employed studio assistants to help create multiple prints of his famous oils. Thus while it is believed that he designed and painted all of his original paintings, the ones collectors were likely to own were printed factory-like and touched up with manual brush strokes by someone other than Kinkade.

Kinkade is reportedly one of the most counterfeited artists, in large part because of advances in affordable, high resolution digital photography and printing technology. Additionally, mass-produced hand-painted fakes from countries such as China and Thailand abound in the U.S. and around the globe. In 2011, the Kinkade studio said that Kinkade was the most collected artist in Asia but received no income from those regions because of widespread forgery.

=== Business ===
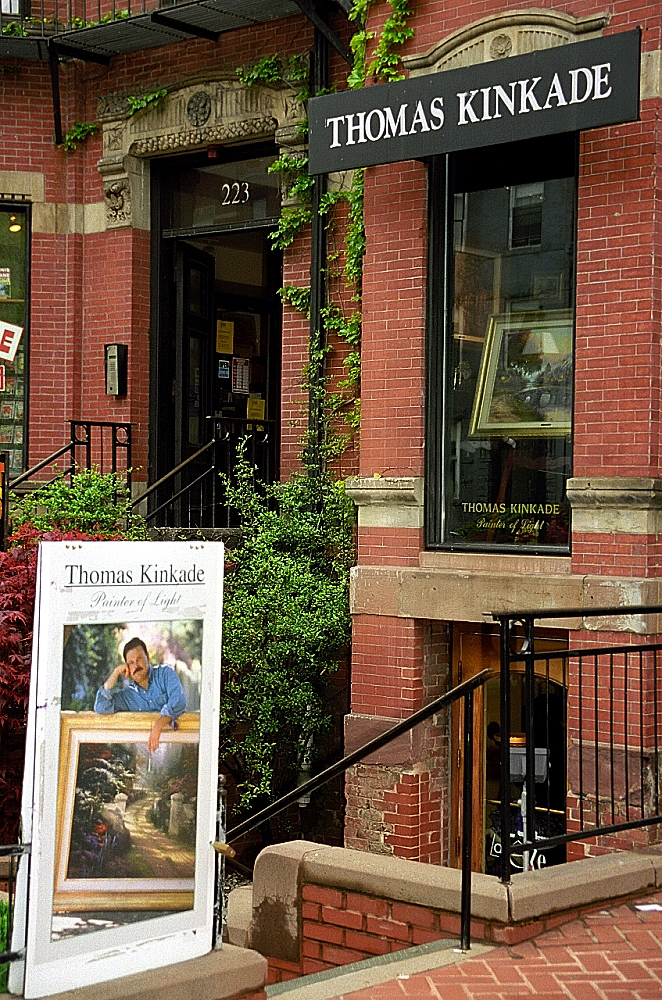
A Kinkade gallery in Boston (2008) showing his painting Spring Gate

Kinkade's works have been sold by mail order and in dedicated retail outlets. Some of the prints feature light effects which are painted onto the print surface by hand by "skilled craftsmen," touches that add to the illusion of light and the resemblance to an original work of art, and which are then sold at higher prices. Licensing with Hallmark and other corporations has made it possible for Kinkade's images to be used extensively for other merchandise including calendars, jigsaw puzzles, greeting cards, and CDs. By December 2009, his images also appeared on Walmart gift cards.

Kinkade was reported to have earned $53 million for his artistic work during the period 1997 to May 2005. Around 2000, there was a national network of several hundred Thomas Kinkade Signature Galleries; however, they began to falter during the 2007-2009 recession. During June 2010, his Morgan Hill, California manufacturing operation, which reproduced the art, filed for Chapter 11 bankruptcy protection, listing nearly $6.2 million in creditors' claims. The company, Pacific Metro, planned to reduce its costs by outsourcing much of its manufacturing.

== Criticism and controversy ==
=== Reception ===
Although Kinkade was among the most commercially successful painters of the 1990s, his work has been criticized. Soon after news of his death in April 2012, author Susan Orlean termed it the death of a "kitsch master". Also during April 2012, journalist Laura Miller lampooned Kinkade's work as "a bunch of garish cottage paintings".

Kinkade was criticized for the extent to which he commercialized his art, for example, by selling his prints on QVC, a home shopping TV network. Some academics expressed concerns about the implications of Kinkade's success in relation to Western perceptions of visual art. In 2009, Nathan Rabin of The A.V. Club wrote, "To his detractors, he represents the triumph of sub-mediocrity and the commercialization and homogenization of painting ... perhaps no other painter has been as shameless or as successful at transforming himself into a corporation as Kinkade." Among such people, he is known more as a "mall artist" or a "chocolate box artist" than as a merited painter. Rabin later said that Kinkade's paintings collectively are "a maudlin, sickeningly sentimental vision of a world where everything is as soothing as a warm cup of hot chocolate with marshmallows on a cold December day".

In a 2001 interview, Kinkade said, "I am really the most controversial artist in the world."

=== Business practices ===
Kinkade's company, Media Arts Group Inc., was accused of unfair dealings with owners of Thomas Kinkade Signature Gallery franchises. In 2006, an arbitration board awarded Karen Hazlewood and Jeffrey Spinello $860,000 in damages and $1.2 million in fees and expenses due to Kinkade's company "[failing] to disclose material information" which would have discouraged them from investing in the gallery. The award was later increased to $2.8 million with interest and legal fees. The plaintiffs and other former gallery owners also made accusations of being pressured to open additional galleries which were not viable financially; being forced to accept expensive, unsalable inventory; and being undersold by discount outlets the prices of which they were not allowed to match. Kinkade denied the accusations, and Media Arts Group had defended itself successfully in previous suits by other former gallery owners. He himself was not singled out in the finding of fraud by the arbitration board. In August 2006, the Los Angeles Times reported that the FBI was investigating the issues, with agents from offices across the country conducting interviews.

Former gallery dealers also charged that the company used Christianity to take advantage of people. "They really knew how to bait the hook," said one ex-dealer who spoke on condition of anonymity. "They certainly used the Christian hook." One former dealer's lawyer said, "Most of my clients got involved with Kinkade because it was presented as a religious opportunity. Being defrauded is awful enough, but doing it in the name of God is really despicable." On June 2, 2010, Pacific Metro, the artist's production company, filed for Chapter 11 bankruptcy, one day after defaulting on a $1 million court-imposed payment to the aforementioned Karen Hazlewood and Jeffrey Spinello. A $500,000 payment had been disbursed previously.

From 1997 through 2005, court documents show that there were at least 350 independently owned Kinkade franchises. By May 2005, that number had more than halved. Kinkade received $50 million during that period. An initial cash investment of $80,000 to $150,000 is listed as a startup cost for franchisees.

=== Personal conduct ===
The Los Angeles Times reported that some of Kinkade's former colleagues, employees, and even collectors of his work said that he had a long history of cursing and heckling other artists and performers. The Times wrote that he openly fondled a woman's breasts at a sales event in South Bend, Indiana and alleged his proclivity for ritual territory marking by urination, once relieving himself on a Winnie the Pooh figure at the Disneyland Hotel in Anaheim while saying, "This one's for you, Walt." In a letter to licensed gallery owners acknowledging he might have behaved badly during a stressful time when he overindulged in food and drink, Kinkade said accounts of the alcohol-related incidents included "exaggerated, and in some cases outright fabricated personal accusations". The letter did not address any incident specifically.

In 2006, John Dandois, Media Arts Group executive, recounted a story that on one occasion six years previously, Kinkade became drunk at a Siegfried & Roy magic show in Las Vegas and began shouting "Codpiece! Codpiece!" at the performers. Eventually he was calmed by his mother. Dandois also said of Kinkade, "Thom would be fine, he would be drinking, and then all of a sudden, you couldn't tell where the boundary was, and then he became very incoherent, and he would start cussing and doing a lot of weird stuff." In June 2010, Kinkade was arrested near Carmel, California for driving while under the influence of alcohol. He was convicted and served 10 days in jail.

== Related projects and partnerships ==
Kinkade was selected by a number of organizations to celebrate anniversaries, including Disneyland's 50th anniversary, Walt Disney World's 35th anniversary, the 50th anniversary of Elvis Presley's purchase of Graceland, the 25th anniversary of its opening to the public, and Yankee Stadium's farewell 85th season in 2008. Kinkade also paid tribute to Fenway Park.

Kinkade was the artist chosen to depict the historic Biltmore Estate house; he also created the commemorative portrait of the 50th running of the Daytona 500 during 2008.

In 2001, Media Arts unveiled "The Village at Hiddenbrooke," a Kinkade-themed community of homes, built outside of Vallejo, California, in partnership with the international construction company Taylor Woodrow. Salon's Janelle Brown visited the community and found it to be "the exact opposite of the Kinkadeian ideal. Instead of quaint cottages, there's generic tract housing; instead of lush landscapes, concrete patios; instead of a cozy village, there's a bland collection of homes with nothing—not a church, not a cafe, not even a town square—to draw them together."

== Charities and affiliations ==
Kinkade donated to non-profit organizations concerned with children, humanitarian relief, and the arts including Make-a-Wish Foundation, World Vision, Art for Children Charities, and the Salvation Army. During 2002, he partnered with the Salvation Army to create two charity prints, The Season of Giving and The Light of Freedom. Proceeds from the sale of the prints were donated to the Salvation Army for their relief efforts at the World Trade Center site and to aid the victims of the September 11 attacks and their families in New York City, Pennsylvania, and Washington, D.C. More than $2 million was donated as a result of the affiliation.

In 2003, Kinkade was chosen as a National Spokesman for the Make-A-Wish Foundation, and during the 20 Years of Light Tour in 2004, he raised more than $750,000 granting 12 wishes for children with life-threatening medical conditions.

In 2005, the Points of Light Foundation, a nonprofit organization dedicated to engaging more people more effectively in volunteer service to help solve serious social problems, named Kinkade as "Ambassador of Light". He was the second person in the Foundation's 15-year history to be chosen as Ambassador, the first being the organization's founder, former President George H. W. Bush. During his Ambassador of Light Tour, Kinkade visited cities nationwide to increase awareness and raise money for the Points of Light Foundation and the Volunteer Center National Network, which serves more than 360 Points of Light member Volunteer Centers in communities across the country.

Archbishop Mitty High School of San Jose dedicated the "Thomas Kinkade Center for the Arts" in 2003. Kinkade was reportedly a Church of the Nazarene member.

== Awards and recognition ==
Kinkade received many awards for his works including multiple National Association of Limited Edition Dealers (NALED) awards for Artist of the Year and Graphic Artist of the Year. His art was named Lithograph of the Year nine times.

In 2002, Kinkade was inducted into the California Tourism Hall of Fame as an individual who had influenced the public's perception of tourism in California through his images of California sights. He was selected along with fellow artists Simon Bull and Howard Behrens to commemorate the 2002 Salt Lake City Winter Olympics and the 2002 World Series. He was honored with the 2002 World Children's Center Humanitarian Award for his contributions to improving the welfare of children and their families through his work with Kolorful Kids and Art for Children.

In 2003, Kinkade was chosen as a national spokesperson for Make-A-Wish Foundation. In 2004, he was selected for a second time by the Christmas Pageant of Peace to paint the National Christmas Tree in Washington, D.C. The painting, Symbols of Freedom, was the official image for the 2004 Pageant of Peace. In 2004, he received an award from NALED recognizing him as the Most Award Winning Artist in the Past 25 Years. In 2005, he was named the NALED Graphic Artist of the Year. He was recognized for his philanthropic efforts by NALED with the Eugene Freedman Humanitarian Award.

== In popular culture ==
In Joseph Heath and Andrew Potter's 2004 book The Rebel Sell: Why the Culture Can't Be Jammed, Kinkade's work is described as being "so awful it must be seen to be believed". In Dana Spiotta's 2011 novel Stone Arabia, the main character's boyfriend, an art teacher at a private school in Los Angeles, gives Kinkade pieces, which are described as "deeply hideous" and "kitschy", to others as gifts, explaining his rationale for that by saying, "Well, he is America's most successful artist and a native Californian as well." At another point he says, "His name has a trademark—see?' and he would point to the subscript that appeared after his name." Mat Johnson's 2011 novel Pym includes a parody of Kinkade named Thomas Karvel, "the Master of Light".

A self-produced movie about Kinkade, Thomas Kinkade's Christmas Cottage, was released on DVD in late November 2008. The semi-autobiographical story examines the motivation and inspiration behind his most popular painting, The Christmas Cottage. Jared Padalecki plays Kinkade and Marcia Gay Harden portrays his mother. Peter O'Toole plays young Kinkade's mentor, who tells him, "Paint the light, Thomas! Paint the light!." In "Mother", a fifth season episode of Veep, an HBO series, Selina Meyer discusses her mother, Mee-Maw, with her daughter, Catherine. Selina makes a disparaging comment about Mee-Maw, and Catherine asks: "Mom, why would you want to paint Mee-Maw in such a negative light?" Selina answers, "Oh, Catherine, Thomas-__-Kinkade couldn't paint Mee-Maw in a positive light!"

Bob Odenkirk references Thomas Kinkade on his 2014 comedy album, Amateur Hour. On the track "The Kids", Odenkirk includes Kinkade's paintings in a litany of things he encourages his children to appreciate when in reality he wants them to reject them when they are older. In June 2012, a month after Kinkade's death, Bob Odenkirk's brother, Bill, wrote a poem, "Lights Out", in acknowledgement of his passing.

In 2025, the indie band Coma Cinema released the single "Thomas Kinkade's Grand Delusion" about the life and work of the artist.

== Personal life ==
Kinkade and Nanette Willey married in 1982 and they had four daughters, all named for famous artists. Thomas Kinkade and his wife had been separated for more than a year before his death in 2012.

== Death and legacy ==
Kinkade died at his home in Monte Sereno, California in 2012, at age 54. He is buried at Madronia Cemetery in Saratoga, California.

Kinkade's family initially said that he appeared to have died of natural causes. After an autopsy, it was announced that he died as a result of acute intoxication from alcohol and diazepam. In corroboration with the autopsy, according to Amy Pinto-Walsh, his girlfriend of 21 months, Kinkade had been at home drinking alcohol the night before his death. Pinto-Walsh said that the artist "died in his sleep, very happy, in the house he built, with the paintings he loved, and the woman he loved." After Kinkade's death, his wife sought a restraining order against his girlfriend to prevent her from publicly releasing information and photos with respect to Kinkade, his marriage, his business, and his personal behavior that "would be personally devastating" to Kinkade's wife. By December 2012, Nanette Kinkade and Amy Pinto-Walsh announced they had reached a private agreement in the matter.

A documentary about Kinkade's life, Art For Everybody, was released in 2023. It includes coverage of his unpublished work, which "experiments with forms and styles and frequently depict[ed] the darkness that lurked inside of him. In several images, dark brooding figures rendered in charcoal seem haunted." The documentary "complicate[s] the [Kinkade] narrative."
