= Marcia Gay Harden =

American actress (born 1959)

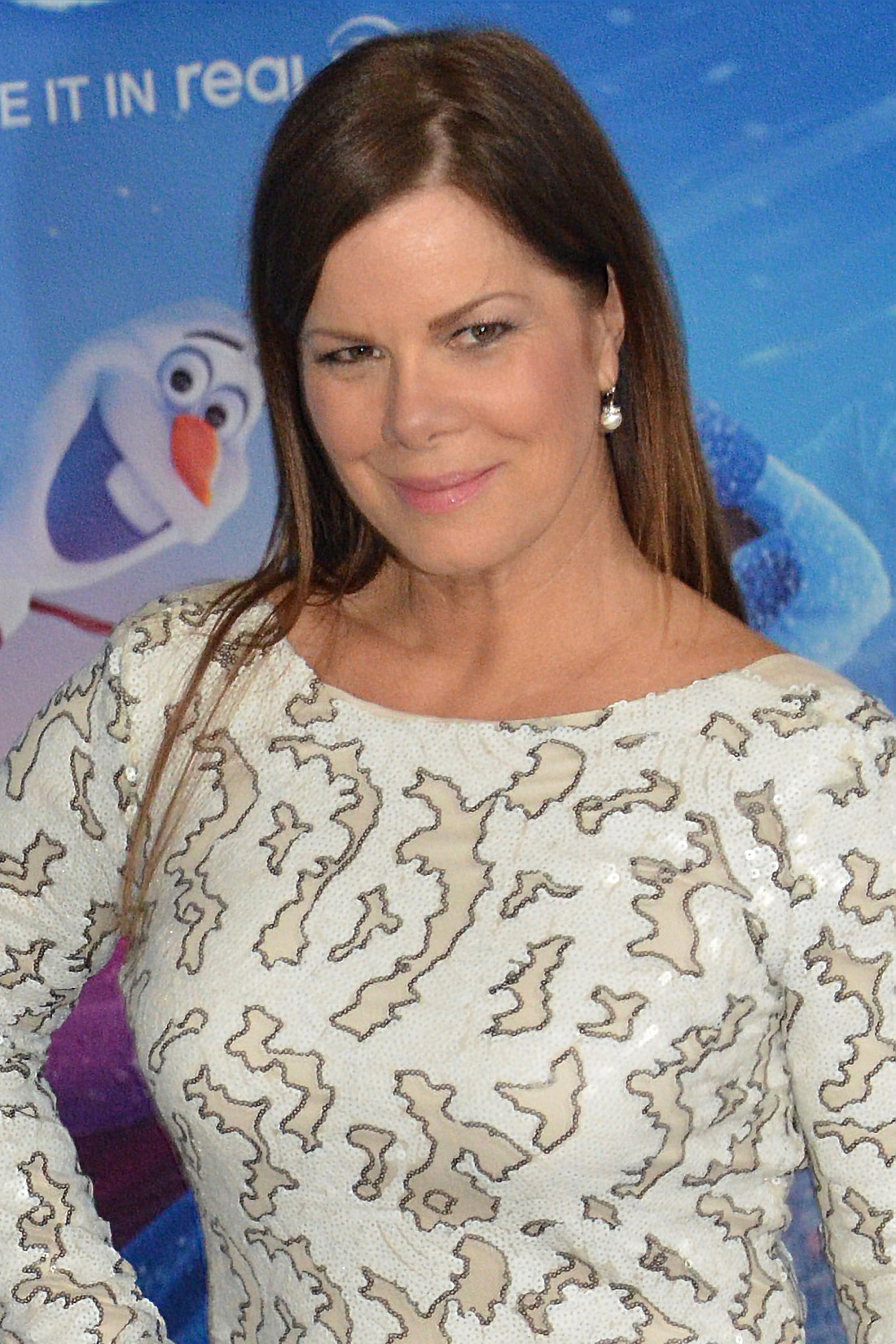
- Harden in 2013
- Born: August 14, 1959 (age 67); San Diego, California, U.S.
- Education: University of Texas, Austin (BA); New York University (MFA)
- Occupation: Actress
- Years active: 1979–present
- Spouse: Thaddaeus Scheel (m. 1996; div. 2012)
- Children: 3
- Awards: Full list

Marcia Gay Harden (born August 14, 1959) is an American actress. Her breakthrough came in 1990 with the Coen brothers' film Miller's Crossing. She received nominations for the Academy Award for Best Supporting Actress for Pollock (2000) and Mystic River (2003), winning for her portrayal of artist Lee Krasner in the former. Her other notable film credits include The First Wives Club (1996), Flubber (1997), Space Cowboys (2000), Mona Lisa Smile (2003), The Mist (2007), and the Fifty Shades film series (2015–2018).

Harden's television credits include guest roles in the HBO series The Newsroom (2013–2014) and the ABC series How to Get Away with Murder (2015–2020), as well as main roles in the CBS series Code Black (2015–2018) and So Help Me Todd (2022–2024). She received Primetime Emmy Award nominations for her guest roles in the crime drama series Law & Order: Special Victims Unit (2005) and the Apple TV+ series The Morning Show, and supporting role in the television film The Courageous Heart of Irena Sendler (2009).

Harden made her Broadway debut in 1993, starring in Tony Kushner's epic play Angels in America for which she was nominated for a Tony Award for Best Featured Actress in a Play. She returned to Broadway in 2009 in Yasmina Reza's comedic play God of Carnage, with her performance earning her the Tony Award for Best Actress in a Play.

== Early life ==
Harden was born in the La Jolla area of San Diego, California, the daughter of Texas natives Beverly Harden (née Bushfield), a housewife, and Thad Harold Harden (1932–2002), who was a Captain and fighter pilot who served 30 years in the United States Navy. She has three sisters and one brother.

Harden's brother is named Thaddeus, as are her father and her former husband. Harden's family frequently moved because of her father's job, living in Japan, Germany, Greece, California, and Maryland.

Harden graduated from Surrattsville High School in Clinton, Maryland in 1976. She earned a Bachelor of Arts in theater from the University of Texas at Austin in 1980, and a Master of Fine Arts from New York University's Tisch School of the Arts in 1988.

== Career ==
Harden's first film role was in a 1979 student-produced film at the University of Texas. Throughout the 1980s, she appeared in several television programs, including Simon & Simon, Kojak, and CBS Summer Playhouse. She appeared in The Imagemaker (1986), her first film screen role, in which she played a stage manager. She appeared in the Coen brothers' Miller's Crossing (1990), a 1930s mobster drama in which she first gained wide exposure. Even so, at the time, living in New York City, she had to go back to doing catering jobs "because I didn't have any money".

Harden debuted on Broadway in the role of Harper Pitt (and others) in Tony Kushner's Angels in America in 1993. The role earned her critical acclaim and she received a Tony Award nomination (Best Featured Actress in a Play).

Harden played actress Ava Gardner alongside Philip Casnoff as Frank Sinatra in the 1992 made-for-TV miniseries Sinatra. Throughout the 1990s, she continued to appear in films and television. Her notable film roles include the Disney sci-fi comedy Flubber (1997), a popular hit in which she co-starred with Robin Williams; the supernatural drama Meet Joe Black (1998), playing the under-appreciated daughter of a tycoon (Anthony Hopkins, co-starring Brad Pitt); Labor of Love (1998), a Lifetime television film in which she starred with David Marshall Grant; and Space Cowboys (2000), an all-star adventure-drama about aging astronauts.

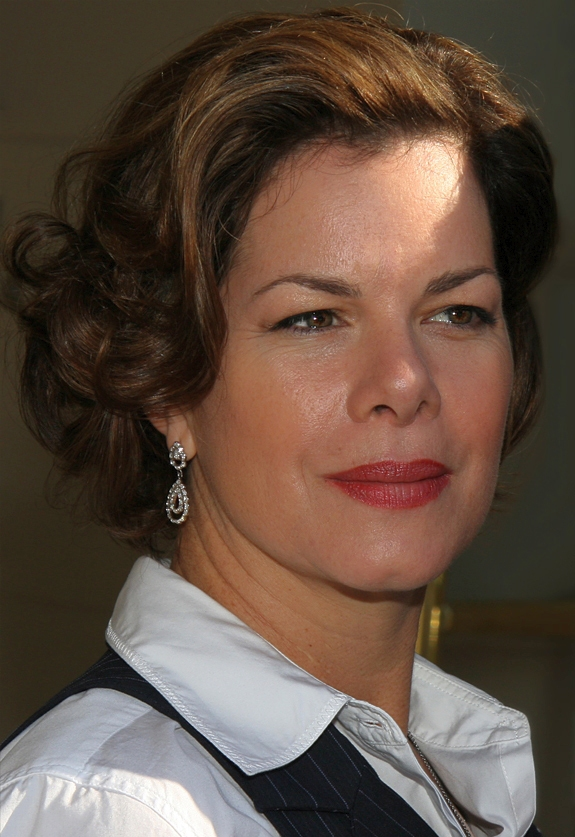
Harden at the 2007 Toronto International Film Festival

In 2000, Harden won the Academy Award for Best Supporting Actress for her portrayal of painter Lee Krasner in the biographical film Pollock. In 2004, she received a second Academy Award nomination for Best Supporting Actress for her performance in the mystery crime drama Mystic River.

Harden guest-starred as FBI undercover agent Dana Lewis posing as a white supremacist in "Raw", an episode of the popular crime drama Law & Order: Special Victims Unit. This role earned Harden her first Emmy Award nomination for best guest actress in a drama series in 2007. She reprised the role in the series' eighth-season premiere and again in the 12th-season episode "Penetration" as a rape victim.

Harden appeared in several 2007 films, including Sean Penn's Into the Wild and Frank Darabont's The Mist (opposite Thomas Jane and Laurie Holden), based on the novella by Stephen King. Also in 2007, she shared top billing with Kevin Bacon in Rails & Ties, the directorial debut of Alison Eastwood. Harden played a woman who has a mastectomy in Home (2008). (Her character in Rails & Ties also had a mastectomy.) Scenes in both films required her to bare her breasts, with the missing breast removed using computer-generated imagery. In Home, her co-stars include her daughter, Eulala Scheel. Harden starred in the Christmas Cottage, a story of the early artistic beginnings of the painter Thomas Kinkade.

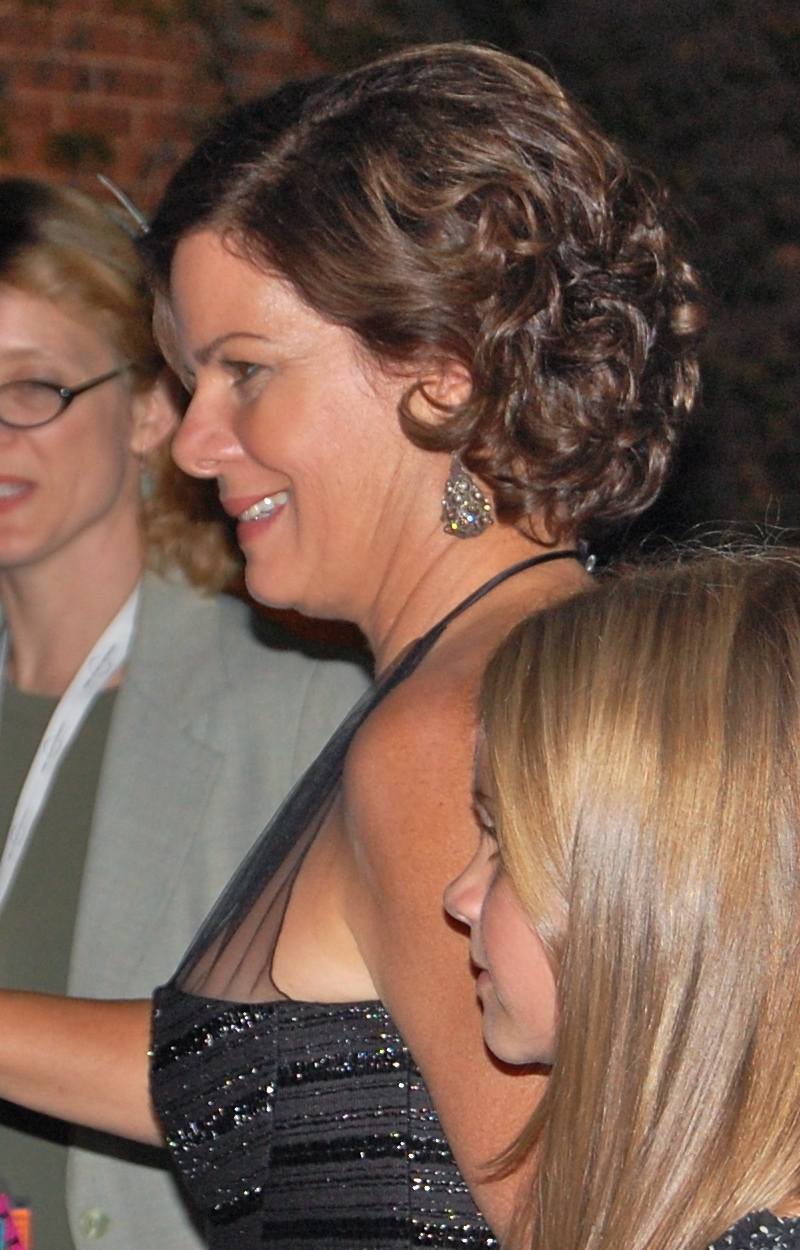
Harden at the 2009 Toronto International Film Festival

Harden appeared as a regular on the FX series Damages as a shrewd corporate attorney opposite Glenn Close and William Hurt in 2009. She received a 2009 Emmy nomination for her role in The Courageous Heart of Irena Sendler, a TV film also starring Oscar-winner Anna Paquin. She was a Best Supporting Actress in a TV Movie/Miniseries nominee and lost to Shohreh Aghdashloo. If she had won this Emmy, Harden would have entered the elite group of "triple-crown" actors, those who have won the profession's three highest honors: the Academy Award (film), the Tony Award (stage), and the Emmy Award (television).

Harden co-starred with Elliot Page and Drew Barrymore in 2009's Whip It, which proved a critical success. She also appeared in the comedy The Maiden Heist (2009) with Christopher Walken and Morgan Freeman.

Harden returned to Broadway in Yasmina Reza's God of Carnage, co-starring with James Gandolfini, Hope Davis and Jeff Daniels, in 2009. All three actors were nominated for a Tony Award; Harden won Best Actress in a Play.

Harden reunited with her former Broadway co-star Jeff Daniels as a new cast member on HBO's series The Newsroom in 2013. She played Christian Grey's mother, Grace Trevelyan Grey, in the Fifty Shades film series from 2015 to 2018. Also in 2015, she began a starring role in the TV series Code Black. She stars in the 2022 CBS drama So Help Me Todd, since renewed for a second season.

== Personal life ==
In 1996, Harden married Thaddaeus Scheel, a prop master, with whom she worked on The Spitfire Grill. They have three children. In February 2012, Harden filed for divorce from Scheel.

Harden once owned property in the Catskills and a townhouse in Harlem. She sold the townhouse in 2012.

Harden is an avid potter, which she learned in high school, then took up again while acting in Angels in America. She is a practitioner of ikebana, the art of Japanese flower arrangement, which her mother learned when they lived in Japan. Harden gave a brief demonstration in 2007 on The Martha Stewart Show, and presented some works of her family.

In May 2018, a memoir called The Seasons of My Mother: A Memoir of Love, Family, and Flowers was published. The book details the story and bond of mother and daughter throughout time and how they are dealing with the largest struggle yet, her mother's Alzheimer's disease. Harden created works of ikebana specifically for this book to illustrate the different seasons of her mother's life.

== Acting credits ==
=== Film ===
Year	Title	Role	Notes
1990	Miller's Crossing	Verna Bernbaum	
1991	Late for Dinner	Joy Husband	
1991	In Broad Daylight	Adina Rowan	
1992	Crush	Lane	
1992	Used People	Norma Schulman	
1994	Safe Passage	Cynthia	
1996	The Spitfire Grill	Shelby Goddard	
1996	The Daytrippers	Libby	
1996	The First Wives Club	Dr. Leslie Rosen	
1996	Spy Hard	Miss Cheevus	
1996	Far Harbor	Arabella	
1997	Flubber	Dr. Sara Jean Reynolds	
1998	Desperate Measures	Dr. Samantha Hawkins	
1998	Meet Joe Black	Allison Parrish	
1998	Curtain Call	Michelle Tippet	
2000	Space Cowboys	Sara Holland	
2000	Pollock	Lee Krasner	
2001	Gaudi Afternoon	Frankie Stevens	
2003	Mystic River	Celeste Boyle	
2003	Casa de los Babys	Nan	
2003	Mona Lisa Smile	Nancy Abbey	
2004	Welcome to Mooseport	Grace Sutherland	
2004	P.S.	Missy Goldberg	
2005	Bad News Bears	Liz Whitewood	
2005	Willa Cather: The Road Is All	Willa Cather	Voice role
2005	American Gun	Janet Huttenson	
2006	American Dreamz	First Lady Staton	
2006	The Dead Girl	Melora Kutcher	
2006	The Hoax	Edith Irving	
2006	Canvas	Mary Marino	
2007	The Invisible	Diane Powell	
2007	Into the Wild	Billie McCandless	
2007	Rails & Ties	Megan Stark	
2007	The Mist	Mrs. Carmody	
2008	Home	Inga	
2008	Thomas Kinkade's Home for Christmas	Maryanne Kinkade	
2009	The Maiden Heist	Rose	
2009	Whip It	Brooke Cavendar	
2010	A Cat in Paris	Jeanne	Voice role
2011	Detachment	Principal Carol Dearden	
2011	Someday This Pain Will Be Useful to You	Marjorie Dunfour	
2012	Noah's Ark: The New Beginning	Aamah	Voice role
2012	If I Were You	Madelyn	
2013	The Wine of Summer	Shelley	
2013	Parkland	Head Nurse Doris Nelson	
2014	Magic in the Moonlight	Mrs. Baker	
2014	You're Not You	Elizabeth	
2014	Elsa & Fred	Lydia Barcroft	
2014	Unity	Narrator	Documentary
2015	Grandma	Judy	
2015	Fifty Shades of Grey	Grace Trevelyan Grey	
2015	Larry Gaye: Renegade Male Flight Attendant	President of the FAFAFA	
2015	After Words	Jane Taylor	
2016	Get a Job	Katherine Dunn	
2017	Fifty Shades Darker	Grace Trevelyan Grey	
2018	Fifty Shades Freed	Grace Trevelyan Grey	
2019	Point Blank	Regina Lewis	
2020	Pink Skies Ahead	Pamela	
2021	Moxie	Principal Marlene Shelly	
2022	Gigi & Nate	Claire Gibson	
2022	Confess, Fletch	Countess Sylvia de Grassi	
2022	Tell It Like a Woman	Dr. Partovi	
2023	Daughter of the Bride	Diane York	
2023	Knox Goes Away	Ruby Knox	
2025	Renner	Salenus (voice)	
2026	The Dreadful	Morwen	
2026	Street Smart	Dr. Partovi	
TBA	Hystoria †	—N/a	Post-production

Key
†	Denotes films that have not yet been released

=== Television ===
Year	Title	Role	Notes
1987	CBS Summer Playhouse	Kim	Episode: "In the Lion's Den"
1988	Simon & Simon	Joan	Episode: "Ties That Bind"
1989	Gideon Oliver	Lila	Episode: "Sleep Well, Professor Oliver"
1991	In Broad Daylight	Adina Rowan	TV movie
1991	Fever	Lacy	TV movie
1992	Sinatra	Ava Gardner	TV movie
1995	Fallen Angels	Marie	Episode: "Good Housekeeping"
1995	Chicago Hope	Barbara Tomilson	Episode: "Internal Affairs"
1995	Great Performances	Performer	Episode: "Talking With..."
1995	Homicide: Life on the Street	Joan Garbarek	Episode: "A Doll's Eyes"
1997	Path to Paradise	Nancy Floyd	TV movie
1998	Labor of Love	Annie Pines	TV movie
1999	Spenser: Small Vices	Susan Silverman	TV movie
2000	Thin Air	Susan Silverman	TV movie
2001	Walking Shadow	Susan Silverman	TV movie
2001–2002	The Education of Max Bickford	Andrea Haskell	22 episodes
2002	Guilty Hearts	Jenny Moran	TV movie
2002	King of Texas	Mrs. Susannah Lear Tumlinson	TV movie
2004	She's Too Young	Trish Vogul	TV movie
2005	Felicity: An American Girl Adventure	Mrs. Martha Merriman	TV movie
2005–2013	Law & Order: Special Victims Unit	FBI Special Agent Dana Lewis	4 episodes
2006	In from the Night	Vicki Miller	TV movie
2008	The Tower	Zoe Cafritz	TV movie
2008	Sex and Lies in Sin City	Becky Binion	TV movie
2009	Damages	Claire Maddox	7 episodes
2009	The Courageous Heart of Irena Sendler	Janina Kyzyzanowska	TV movie
2010	Royal Pains	Dr. Elizabeth Blair	3 episodes
2011	Amanda Knox: Murder on Trial in Italy	Edda Mellas	TV movie
2011	Innocent	Barbara Sabich	TV movie
2012	Body of Proof	Sheila Temple	Episode: "Sympathy for the Devil"
2012	Bent	Vanessa Carter	Episode: "Mom"
2012–2013	Tron: Uprising	Keller	Voice, 2 episodes
2012	Isabel	Frances Lorenz	TV movie
2013–2014	The Newsroom	Rebecca Halliday	10 episodes
2013–2014	Trophy Wife	Diane	22 episodes
2015	How to Get Away with Murder	Dr. Hannah Keating	4 episodes
2015–2018	Code Black	Dr. Leanne Rorish	Main role, 47 episodes
2019	Love You to Death	Camile Stoller	TV movie
2019	BoJack Horseman	Denise/McCaitlyn/Melodie	Voice, 2 episodes
2019–present	The Morning Show	Maggie Brener	10 episodes
2020	A Million Little Things	Alice	Episode: "Guilty"
2020	Barkskins	Mathilde Geffard	Main role
2022	Uncoupled	Claire Lewis	Recurring role
2022	The Cuphead Show!	Sally Stageplay	Voice, 2 episodes
2022–2024	So Help Me Todd	Margaret Wright	Main role, 31 episodes
2025	Murder in a Small Town	Mayor Christine Holman	Main role, season 2 only
2026	Margo's Got Money Troubles	Elizabeth Gable	Miniseries, 2 episodes

Key
†	Denotes films that have not yet been released

=== Theater ===
Year	Title	Role	Writer	Venue	Ref.
1989	The Man Who Shot Lincoln	Mary Devlin	Luigi Creatore	Astor Place Theatre, Off-Broadway	
1992–1993	The Years	Isabella	Cindy Lou Johnson	New York City Center – Stage I	
1993–1994	Angels in America	Harper Pitt / Martin Heller	Tony Kushner	Walter Kerr Theatre, Broadway	
1994	Simpatico	Cecilia	Sam Shepard	The Public Theater, Off-Broadway	
2001	The Seagull	Masha	Anton Chekhov	Delacorte Theater, Off-Broadway	
2009	God of Carnage	Veronica	Yasmina Reza	Bernard B. Jacobs Theatre, Broadway	
2017	Sweet Bird of Youth	Alexandra del Lago	Tennessee Williams	Chichester Festival Theatre, England	
2023	Gutenberg! The Musical!	Producer	Scott Brown & Anthony King	James Earl Jones Theatre, Broadway	

== Bibliography ==
- Harden, Marcia Gay (2018). The Seasons of My Mother: A Memoir of Love, Family, and Flowers. New York: Atria Books. ISBN 978-1-5011-3572-9. OCLC 1027733089.

== See also ==
- List of people from Harlem
