= Michael Gaston =

American actor

- Citizenship: United States
- Occupation: Actor
- Years active: 1990–present
- Children: 2

Michael Gaston is an American film and television actor. He played agent Quinn on the show Prison Break, Gray Anderson on the CBS drama series Jericho, and appeared in the first episode of The Sopranos as Alex Mahaffey, a compulsive gambler in trouble with Tony. He had a recurring role in The Mentalist as CBI Director Gale Bertram.

== Career ==
Gaston started his professional career in a 1990 off-Broadway production of The Taming of the Shrew, continuing with other off-Broadway productions through the years, including a 1996 production of Henry V, and a 2018 production of I Was Most Alive With You, amongst others. He has also performed on Broadway, in a 2003 production of A Day in the Death of Joe Egg and a 2013 production of Lucky Guy.

Gaston portrayed General Tommy Franks in W. He has appeared in more than twenty films, including Bridge of Spies, Sudden Death, Ransom, Cop Land, Thirteen Days, The Crucible, Double Jeopardy, High Crimes, Sugar and Body of Lies and Bless the Child. He has had roles in numerous TV dramas, including The Sopranos, The West Wing, Homicide: Life on the Street, Law & Order, Law & Order: Special Victims Unit, Fringe, The Practice, and 24.

== Personal life ==
Gaston has two children.

On October 10, 2017, during a wave of sexual assault allegations against several men in Hollywood, Gaston detailed in a series of tweets an incident in 1992 when the director of a play he was appearing in groped him sexually during a rehearsal. He stated, "I give the benefit of what little doubt I have to any woman who claims a powerful man treated her inappropriately. Because it happened to me."

== Filmography ==
=== Film ===
Year	Title	Role	Notes
1993	The Wedding Banquet	Justice of the Peace	
1994	Amateur	Sharpshooter	
1995	Hackers	Agent Bob	
1995	Sudden Death	Hickey	
1996	Ransom	Agent Jack Sickler	
1996	The Crucible	Marshal Herrick	
1997	Cop Land	Rubin	
1999	Wayward Son	Edgar	
1999	Double Jeopardy	Cutter	
2000	Bless the Child	Det. Frank Bugatti	
2000	Thirteen Days	Captain of USS Pierce	
2002	High Crimes	Maj. Lucas Waldron	
2002	Far from Heaven	Stan Fine	
2004	Mind the Gap	Priest	
2005	Runaway	Jesse Adler	
2005	The Notorious Bettie Page	Mr. Gaughan	
2005	Stay	Sheriff Kennelly	
2006	Out There	Wayne	
2006	Lonely Hearts	D.A. Hunt	
2008	Sugar	Stu Sutton	
2008	Home	Herman	
2008	Body of Lies	Holiday	
2008	W.	General Tommy Franks	
2009	Hurricane Season	Coach Frank Landon	
2010	Inception	Immigration Officer	
2012	Big Miracle	Porter Beckford	
2015	Bridge of Spies	Williams	
2017	First Reformed	Edward Balq	
2018	Irreplaceable You	Crochet Master	
2018	The Land of Steady Habits	Mitchell Ashford	
2019	Togo	Joe Dexter	
2020	Spenser Confidential	John Boylan	
2021	A Mouthful of Air	Ron	
2026	Disclosure Day	General Dobbs	

=== Television ===
Year	Title	Role	Notes
1993	The Adventures of Pete & Pete	Mr. Markle	Episode: "Day of the Dot"
1994	Law & Order	Wheeler	Episode: "Old Friends"
1995	New York News	Charles Powell	Episode: "The Using Game"
1996	New York Undercover	Lt. Harding	Episode: "Fire Show"
1996	One Life to Live	Spike	1 episode
1996	Homicide: Life on the Street	Lt. Commander Alex Clifton	Episode: "Control"
1997	Profiler	Art Behar	3 episodes
1997	Law & Order	Ron Fletcher	Episode: "Entrapment"
1998	Spin City	Detective	Episode: "Three Men and a Little Lady"
1999	The Sopranos	Alex Mahaffey	Episode: "Pilot"
1999	Nathan Dixon	Nathan Dixon	TV movie
1999	Law & Order: Special Victims Unit	Buddy	Episode: "A Single Life"
1999	JAG	Makaway	Episode: "Shakedown"
1999	Law & Order	Mr. Delany	Episode: "Harm"
2000	Third Watch	Sergeant	Episode: "Spring Forward, Fall Back"
2000	Now and Again	Deputy Mayor	2 episodes
2000	Oz	Zeke Bellinger	Episode: "The Bill of Wrongs"
2000	Cora Unashamed	Arthur Studevant	TV movie
2000	Deadline	Walter	5 episodes
2001	The $treet	Jerry	Episode: "Junk Bonds"
2001	100 Centre Street	Detective Seger	Episode: "A Shot in the Dark"
2001	Ed	Frank Kerwin	Episode: "Exceptions"
2001	Law & Order	Major Jim Wyman	Episode: "White Lie"
2002	Ally McBeal	Mark Horace	2 episodes
2002	The Practice	Roland Hubert	Episode: "The Cradle Will Rock"
2003	Ed	Frank Kerwin	Episode: "Frankie"
2003	Law & Order: Special Victims Unit	Malcolm Field	Episode: "Damaged"
2003	John Doe	Gary Murchison	Episode: "Family Man"
2003	Hack	Claymore	Episode: "Hidden Agenda"
2004	The Guardian	Coach Steve Bernardo	Episode: "Legacy"
2004	NCIS	Major Dougherty	Episode: "One Shot, One Kill"
2004	Malcolm in the Middle	Mel	Episode: "Softball"
2004	The West Wing	Eric Hayden	Episode: "Eppur Si Muove"
2004	Without a Trace	George Stanley	Episode: "Legacy"
2004	CSI: Crime Scene Investigation	Rick Chilson	Episode: "Bad Words"
2004	JAG	Col. Lewis Atwater	Episode: "This Just in from Baghdad"
2005	Blind Justice	Lt. Gary Fisk	13 episodes
2005	Prison Break	Quinn	2 episodes
2006	Brotherhood	Mr. Speaker	4 episodes
2006–2008	Jericho	Gray Anderson	20 episodes
2007–2012	Damages	Roger Kastle	8 episodes
2008	ER	Rick	Episode: "The Chicago Way"
2009	Law & Order	Pete Gardner	Episode: "Bailout"
2009	Numbers	Gil Fisher	"The Fifth Man"
2009	Fringe	Sanford Harris	4 episodes
2009	Saving Grace	Charlie Hudson	Episode: "Am I Going to Lose Her?"
2009	U.S. Attorney	Douglas G. Smith	TV movie
2009	White Collar	Thompson	Episode: "Pilot"
2009	Raising the Bar	Robert Shepherd	2 episodes
2009	Last of the Ninth	Lt. John "The Rug" White	TV movie
2009–2013	Mad Men	Burt Peterson	4 episodes
2010	24	General David Brucker	2 episodes
2010	Rubicon	Donald Bloom	4 episodes
2010	Terriers	Ben Zeitlin	4 episodes
2010–2013	The Mentalist	Gale Bertram	17 episodes
2011–2012	Unforgettable	Mike Costello	22 episodes
2012–2013	Last Resort	Barton Sinclair	5 episodes
2013	The Americans	Agent Bartholomew	Episode: "Pilot"
2014	Elementary	Kurt Yoder	Episode: "Paint It Black"
2014	Turn: Washington's Spies	General Charles Scott	5 episodes
2014	How to Get Away with Murder	Henry Williams	Episode: "Pilot"
2014–2015	The Good Wife	Ernie Nolan	2 episodes
2014–2017	The Leftovers	Dean	7 episodes
2014–2022	Chicago P.D.	Parish / Chief Patrick O'Neal	3 episodes
2015	The Following	Sheriff Windsor	Episode: "Reunion"
2015	Person of Interest	Mike Richelli	Episode: "Control-Alt-Delete"
2015	NCIS: Los Angeles	CIA Agent Doug Emmerich	Episode: "Expiration Date"
2015	Last Week Tonight with John Oliver	Actor	Episode: "Infrastructure"
2015	Royal Pains	Ed Harper	Episode: "Secret Asian Man"
2015	Blue Bloods	Jim Voutay	Episode: "All the News That's Fit to Click"
2015–2018	The Man in the High Castle	Mark Sampson	13 episodes
2015–2020	Blindspot	Tom Carter	Recurring (season 1), guest (season 5); 8 episodes
2016	Law & Order: Special Victims Unit	Donald Bazinski	Episode: "Catfishing Teacher"
2016	Bones	Agent Brandt Walker	Episode: "The Secret in the Service"
2016	The Interestings	Gil Wolf	Pilot
2016	BrainDead	Lawrence Boch	Episode: "Taking on Water: How Leaks in D.C. Are Discovered and Patched"
2016	Murder in the First	Alfred Arkin	8 episodes
2016	Designated Survivor	James Royce	2 episodes
2017	Madam Secretary	Hugh Haymond	5 episodes
2017	The Immortal Life of Henrietta Lacks	Richard Wilson	TV movie
2017–2020	Power	Judge Tapper	6 episodes
2018	Jack Ryan	President Andrew Pickett	2 episodes
2018–2019	Strange Angel	Virgil Byrne	15 episodes
2019	The Code	General H.H. Carrick IV	Episode: "Blowed Up"
2019	Treadstone	Dan Levine	Main cast
2019	The Marvelous Mrs. Maisel	Judge Wagaman	Episode: "It's the Sixties, Man!"
2020	Law & Order: Special Victims Unit	Gary Wald	Episode: "The Longest Night of Rain"
2020	Agents of S.H.I.E.L.D.	Gerald Sharpe	Episode: "Alien Commies from the Future!"
2020	The Good Lord Bird	Mayor Fontaine Beckham	Episode: "Jesus Is Walkin'"
2020–2021	For Life	Liam McClinchey	2 episodes
2022	Five Days at Memorial	Arthur "Butch" Schafer	6 episodes
2022	Fleishman Is in Trouble	Dr. Bartuck	2 episodes
2024	Yellowstone	Auction Manager	Episode: "Give the World Away"
2025	Daredevil: Born Again	Commissioner Phil Gallo	6 episodes
2025	The Waterfront	Sheriff Clyde Porter	4 episodes
