= Home (2008 American film) =

2008 film

- Directed by: Mary Haverstick
- Written by: Mary Haverstick
- Produced by: Mary Haverstick; Michele Mercure; Chad Taylor
- Starring: Marcia Gay Harden; Marian Seldes; Michael Gaston; Eulala Scheel
- Cinematography: Richard Rutkowski
- Edited by: Mary Haverstick
- Music by: Michele Mercure
- Production company: Haverstick Films
- Release date: August 23, 2008 (Montreal)
- Running time: 84 minutes
- Country: United States
- Language: English

Home is a 2008 American drama film written and directed by Mary Haverstick and starring Marcia Gay Harden, Marian Seldes, Michael Gaston and Eulala Scheel.

== Cast ==
- Marcia Gay Harden
- Marian Seldes
- Michael Gaston
- Eulala Scheel
- Pamela Henning

== Release ==
The film premiered at the Montreal World Film Festival on August 23, 2008.
