= Beautiful Women Wake Up Early =

- Film poster
- Directed by: Keith D Bracker
- Written by: Keith D Bracker
- Produced by: Keith D Bracker
- Starring: Aija Terauda; Raimonda Skeryte; Connie Romano
- Release date: September 15, 2012 (NYC International Film Festival)
- Running time: 21 minutes
- Country: United States
- Language: English

Beautiful Women Wake Up Early is a 2012 film, drama written, produced and directed by Keith D Bracker. It premiered at New York International Film Festival — Los Angeles edition at Raleigh Studios in Los Angeles on September 15, 2012. It has won an Award for Best Experimental Short at the New York International Film Festival — LA edition.

== Plot ==
Beautiful Women Wake Up Early is an experimental piece that looks at the lives of several women—a model, a panic attack stricken woman, a musician, a writer, a romantic ageing woman, an inspired actress, an older theater actress–and how they try to cope with vanity, beauty, death, ageing, gender complexities.

== Cast ==
=== Main ===
- Aija Terauda as Vivien
- Raimonda Skeryte as Gunta
- Connie Romano as Aunt Olivia
- Sarah Himadeh as Melanie
- Joy Caldwell as Monica
- Maria Catalano as Sophia
- Nicole Pesce as Denise
