= Derek Estlin Purvis =

American film director (born 1972)

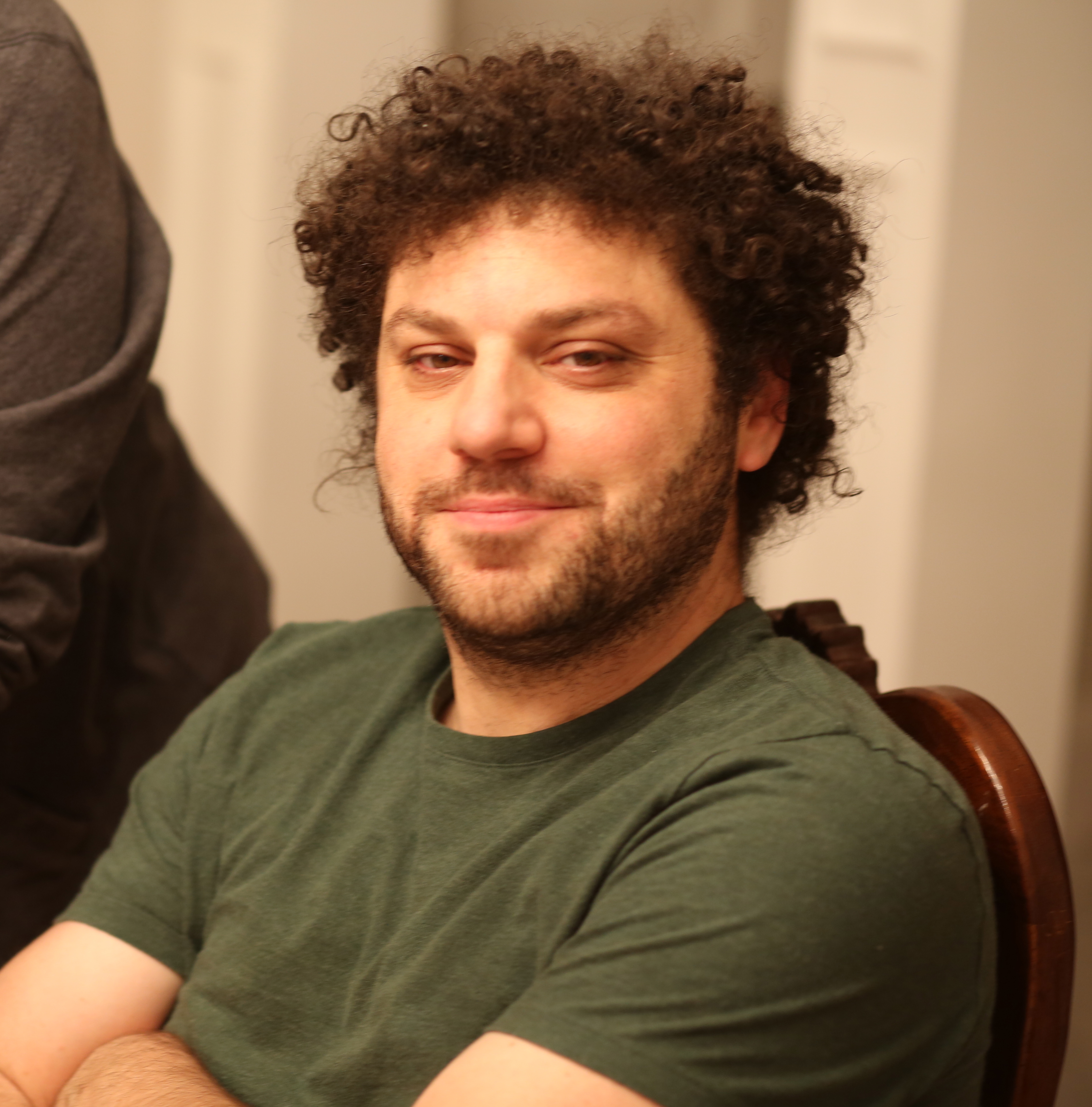
- Purvis on the set of Airtight November 27, 2012
- Born: Derek Estlin Purvis; November 27, 1972 (age 53); Pittsfield, Massachusetts, US
- Years active: 1993–present
- Spouse: Aija Tērauda
- Website: moviepitchpro.com

Derek Estlin Purvis (born November 27, 1972) is an American screenwriter, film director, producer, executive producer and entrepreneur. He has financed, produced or directed 13 feature films of various genres. Purvis is a founder of Movie Pitch Pro.

== Early life ==
Purvis was born in Pittsfield Massachusetts to Joanna Alioto, of Sicilian descent, and Doug Purvis, of Scottish descent. At the age of five, his mother moved him to Holderness, New Hampshire. He spent the next decade growing up in rural New Hampshire, among the mountains and lakes.

== Career ==
Purvis started his career at Paramount Pictures in the early 1990s and spent eight years working inside the studio system. In 2001, he relocated to Boston and worked as an executive producer. In 2005, he joined Markedia Worldwide, a film finance and branded content studio. While at Markedia, Purivs worked with Michael Bassick to finance all or part of eight films, including The Ten starring Paul Rudd and Jessica Alba. He left Markedia in 2010 to partner with Christy Scott Cashman at Saint Aire Productions. Purvis directed and executive produced The Love Guide starring Parker Posey. He created the mobile app Movie Pitch Pro.

== Personal life ==
Purvis married actress Aija Tērauda on December 13, 2013. They have one child born in 2014.

== Filmography ==
Year	Film	Role	Notes
2011	The Love Guide	Director/Executive Producer	
2013	Airtight	Writer/Director/Producer/Executive Producer	
