= Glenn Wessels =

American painter

Glenn Anthony Wessels
- Born: Cape Town, South Africa
- Died: July 23, 1982; Placerville, California, U.S.
- Occupations: Painter, etcher, lithographer, arts educator

Glenn Anthony Wessels (1895 – July 23, 1982) was a Cape Colony-born American painter, etcher, lithographer and arts educator. He was a professor at the California College of the Arts, Washington State University, and the University of California, Berkeley.

== Life ==
Wessels was born in Cape Town, Cape Colony. He emigrated to the United States with his family as a child. He attended the University of California, and he was trained by Hans Hofmann in Munich, Germany.

Wessels was a painter, etcher, lithographer and arts educator. He was a professor at the California College of the Arts, Washington State University, and the University of California, Berkeley. Wessels was an artistic mentor to notable American painter Thomas Kinkade.

Wessels died on July 23, 1982. His artwork is in the permanent collections of the Fine Arts Museums of San Francisco, the Oakland Museum of California, and the Metropolitan Museum of Art in New York City.
