= Airtight Bridge =

- U.S. National Register of Historic Places
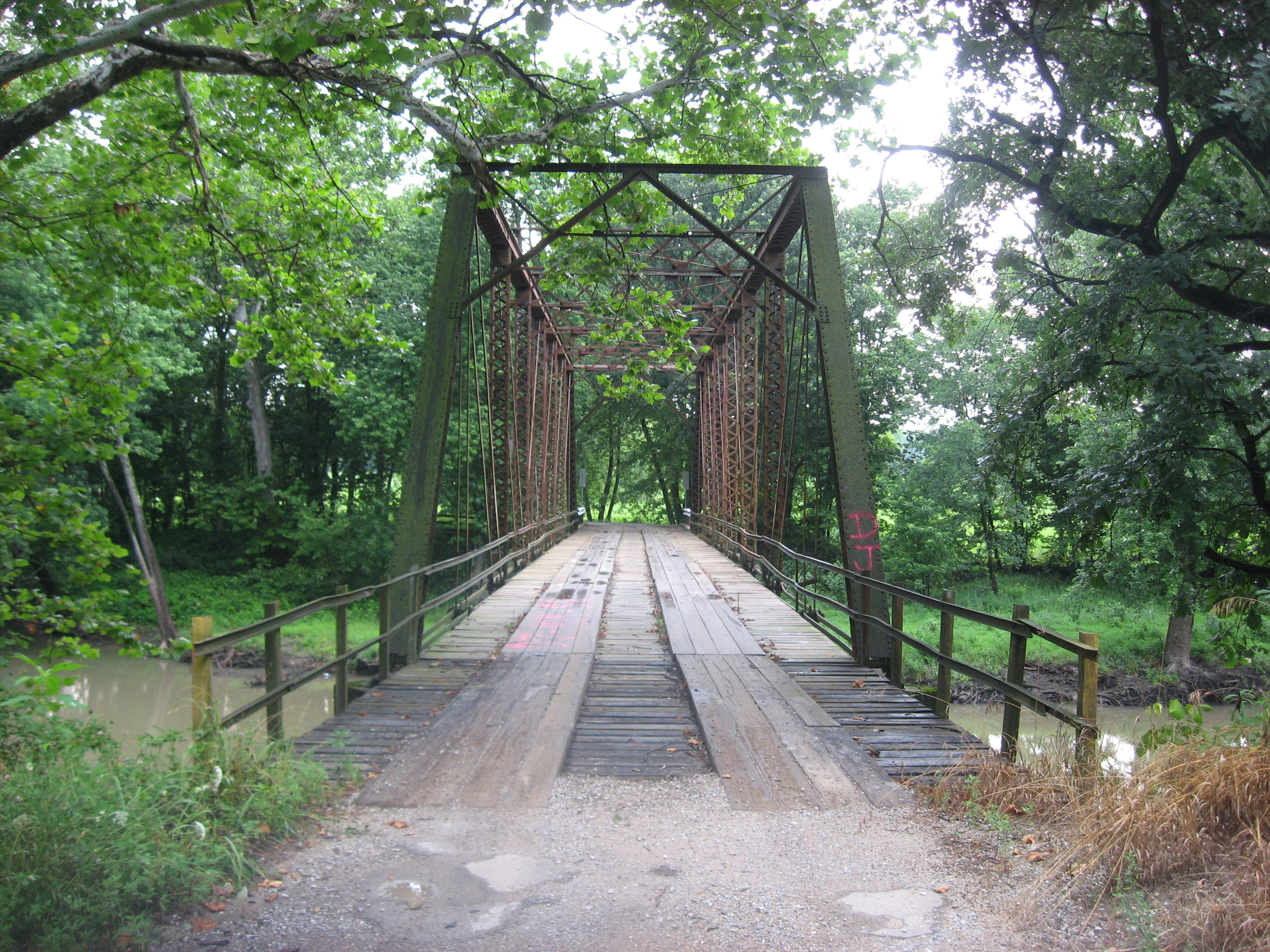
- Eastern portal

- Location within Illinois
- Nearest city: Charleston, IL
- Coordinates: 39°33′18″N 88°05′22″W
- Built: 1914
- Architect: Claude L. James
- MPS: Coles County Highway Bridges Over the Embarras River TR
- NRHP reference No.: 81000211
- Added to NRHP: November 30, 1981

Airtight Bridge
- Coordinates: 39°33′18″N 88°05′22″W
- Carries: Township road 275
- Crosses: Embarras River
- Locale: 8 miles NE of Charleston, Illinois
- ID number: 3165

Characteristics
- Design: Pratt through truss
- Total length: 188 feet 4 inches
- Width: 15 feet 7 inches
- Clearance above: 13 feet 7 inches

History
- Opened: 1914

Location
- Interactive map of Airtight Bridge

The Airtight Bridge is a steel bridge spanning the Embarras River in Coles County, Illinois, in the United States 8 miles (13 km) north of Charleston, Illinois. The bridge is a Pratt through truss bridge with a steel structure, a wooden deck, and concrete piers. The bridge was built in 1914 by the Decatur Bridge Company and designed by engineer Claude L. James. It was added to the National Register of Historic Places in 1981. It reportedly got its name from the unnatural stillness encountered when crossing it.

In 1980, a dismembered corpse was found on the east bank of the river 30 yards downstream from the bridge, leading to significant local press attention. Police investigated for years, but were unable to determine the identity of the victim until 1992, when DNA testing produced a match to a missing person from Kankakee, Illinois. Once a cold case investigated by the Illinois State Police, the victim's husband was charged with the murder on March 2, 2017.
