= Airtight (film) =

2014 film

- Directed by: Derek Estlin Purvis
- Written by: Derek Estlin Purvis
- Starring: Aija Terauda; James Patterson; Michael Engberg
- Production companies: HEDGE; Tranquillibrium Entertainment
- Release date: 2014
- Running time: 82 minutes
- Country: United States
- Language: English

Airtight is a 2014 American thriller film written, produced and directed by Derek Estlin Purvis and starring Aija Terauda, James Patterson, and Michael Engberg. A psychological thriller set in a New York mansion and a homage to Alfred Hitchcock, Airtight is based on the true events that inspired a play in the 1920s, an adaptation by Hitchcock in the 1940s and this feature film. This marks as James Patterson's acting debut before switching his career to esports industry with Riot Games under his in-game name "Dash".

== Plot ==
Bradley and Connor are intellectual elitists who have secretly been planning to murder a former college classmate and close friend, Ronald. Ronald has gathered all of his family and friends to make a big announcement. What Ronald is unaware of is that he will become the victim when Bradley and Connor decide natural selection is no longer doing its job. It is up to them to force Ronald to defend himself and prove that only the strong survive. Unfortunately, he is physically overpowered, bound, gagged and put into an airtight, soundproof chest in the middle of the living room that will be the stage for the night's festivities. Once they have sealed the chest, there is only one hour's worth of air. He will slowly suffocate right beneath his closest friends and family without them ever knowing.

== Cast ==
- Aija Terauda as Leila
- James Patterson as Connor
- Michael Engberg as Bradley
- Daniel Mian as Rupert
- Beau Peregino as Ronald
- Sage Kristien as Kendra
- Lian Toni Amado as Sam
- Chris Scarciotta as Wilson
- Alex Tassinari as Holt
- Brian Styk as Paramedic #4
