= American Gun (2005 film) =

2005 film

- Theatrical release poster
- Directed by: Aric Avelino
- Written by: Aric Avelino; Steven Bagatourian
- Produced by: Ted Kroeber
- Starring: Linda Cardellini; Tony Goldwyn; Marcia Gay Harden; Donald Sutherland; Forest Whitaker
- Edited by: Richard Nord
- Music by: Schuyler Fisk; Peter Golub
- Production company: Participant Productions
- Distributed by: IFC Films
- Release dates: September 15, 2005 (Toronto Film Festival); March 23, 2007 (United States)
- Running time: 95 minutes
- Country: United States
- Language: English
- Box office: $34,138

American Gun is a 2005 American independent crime drama film produced by Participant Productions, IFC Films, IFC First Take, and Spirit Dance Entertainment. It was written in 2001 by Steven Bagatourian and Aric Avelino and directed by Avelino as his directorial debut.

Avelino attended Loyola Marymount University and made the film with many LMU alumni, including producer Ted Kroeber.

The film took two and a half years to finance. The central idea came from a "Column One" article in the Los Angeles Times. In addition, the writers were influenced by a friend from the Chicago school district who related stories about how students brought guns to school, not to use them on campus, but because of the dangerous neighborhoods they live in or walk through to attend classes. Avelino was very appreciative of the directorial advice of Forest Whitaker, one of the film's producers. The first actress attached to the project was Marcia Gay Harden.

== Premise ==
American Gun centers around three stories dealing with the results of gun use: an inner city school principal, a single mother, and an A student who works at her family's gun shop.

== Cast ==
- Marcia Gay Harden – Janet Huttenson
- Forest Whitaker – Carter
- Donald Sutherland – Carl Wilk
- Lisa Long – Sandra Cohen
- Arlen Escarpeta – Jay
- Chris Warren Jr. – Marcus
- David Heymann – Producer
- Chris Marquette – David Huttenson
- Amanda Seyfried – Mouse
- Nikki Reed – Tally
- Joseph Kell – Security Guard
- Tony Goldwyn – Frank
- Rex Linn – Earl
- Kevin Phillips – Reggie
- Davenia McFadden – Felicia
- Linda Cardellini – Mary Ann Wilk
- Schuyler Fisk – Cicily
- Michael Shannon (as Michael J. Shannon) – Jerry
- Charles Duckworth – Connie
- Todd Tesen – Barry
- Melissa Leo – Louise
- Gary Paul Clark – Supervisor
- Ali Hillis - Gun Shop Patron
- Garcelle Beauvais (as Garcelle Beauvais-Nilon) – Sarah

== Reception ==
On review aggregator website Rotten Tomatoes, the film holds an approval rating of 39% based on 31 critic reviews, with an average rating of 5.30/10. The site's critics consensus reads, "Despite its intriguing premise, this earnest anti-gun polemic is too melodramatic to resonate." According to Metacritic, which compiled 14 reviews and calculated a weighted average score of 48 out of 100, the film received "mixed or average" reviews.

== Distribution ==
According to Box Office Mojo, American Gun took in $24,098 in a limited release from one to six theatres in a little over 10 weeks in theatres from March 22 – June 1, 2007. It was featured on the IFC program First Take.

== Awards ==
- Independent Spirit Awards Nominations
  - Best Feature, Ted Kroeber, producer.
  - Best Male Lead, Forest Whitaker.
  - Best Supporting Female, Marcia Gay Harden.
