= Simon Bull =

British-born contemporary painter (born 1958)

- Born: March 6, 1958 (age 68); Bedfordshire, England
- Known for: Painting
- Notable work: Muhammad Ali portrait series
- Website: simonbullart.com

Simon Bull (born 6 March 1958) is a British-born American painter based in California. He works primarily in acrylic painting, with subject matter that includes landscapes and natural forms. His artistic approach has evolved over time from representational work toward more abstract compositions.

== Early life ==
Bull grew up in Bedfordshire, England, and began selling artwork while he was in high school. He later pursued formal training in art before relocating to the United States.

== Career ==
In 2002, Bull was named the official artist for the Salt Lake City Winter Olympics. He was also the official artist for the 2019 National Cherry Blossom Festival in Washington, D.C., and led a workshop in partnership with the Smithsonian American Art Museum.

Bull's style shifted following a health challenge, including treatment for stage-two colon cancer in 2005, which led him toward a more abstract and expressive approach, using darker backgrounds and techniques such as pouring and dripping paint.

His work has been associated with major public cultural events and institutions in the United States.

In 2004, he began a collaboration with boxer Muhammad Ali, creating a series of portraits which were later exhibited in the solo show Language of Color at Park West Gallery in Michigan in 2016.

== Exhibitions ==
- Language of Color, Park West Gallery, Southfield, MI (2016)<
- A Walk Through the Woods, Meuse Gallery, St. Helena, CA (2023)
- Up North, Meuse Gallery, St. Helena, CA (2022)

== Style ==
Bull's work often centers on landscapes and natural themes. His paintings combine observational elements with abstract techniques, using acrylic paint applied in layered and gestural forms.

== Personal life ==
Simon Bull was originally from the United Kingdom and relocated to the Monterey Peninsula, California, in 2003. He became a U.S. citizen in 2011.
