= The Courageous Heart of Irena Sendler =

- Promotional poster
- Written by: John Kent Harrison; Lawrence John Spagnola
- Directed by: John Kent Harrison
- Starring: Anna Paquin; Goran Visnjic; Marcia Gay Harden
- Theme music composer: Jan A.P. Kaczmarek
- Countries of origin: United States; Canada; Poland
- Original language: English

Production
- Producer: Cameron Johann
- Running time: 95 minutes
- Production companies: CBS; Lithuanian Film Studio; Hallmark Hall of Fame; BaltMedia; Jeff Most Productions; K&K Selekt; Telekompānija Forma Pro

Original release
- Network: CBS
- Release: April 19, 2009

The Courageous Heart of Irena Sendler, also known as The Warsaw Ghetto on DVD, is a 2009 television film directed by John Kent Harrison. The teleplay by Harrison and Lawrence John Spagnola, based on the 2007 biography Die Mutter der Holocaust-Kinder: Irena Sendler und die geretteten Kinder aus dem Warschauer Ghetto, focuses on Irena Sendler, a Polish social worker who smuggled approximately 2,500 Jewish children to safety during World War II.

The Hallmark Hall of Fame production was filmed on location in Riga, Latvia. It was broadcast on CBS channels in North America on April 19, 2009, and released to DVD in Hallmark Gold Crown stores in June of that year.

== Plot ==
Irena Sendler (née Krzyżanowska) is a Catholic social worker who has sympathized with the Jews since her childhood, when her physician father died of typhus contracted while treating poor Jewish patients. When she initially proposes saving Jewish children from the Warsaw Ghetto, her idea is met with skepticism by fellow workers, her parish priest, and even her own mother Janina.

Using forged identification to present herself as a nurse to guards at the entrance to the enclave where the Jewish population has been sequestered, Irena tries to convince the parents of young children to allow her to smuggle them out to safety. Many fear they will never see them again, and she assures them she will document where each child is sent to facilitate their reunion with their parents once the war is over. Others bemoan the fact their children will be raised in a faith other than their own and forget their religious beliefs and traditions, but Irena convinces them this is a small price to pay in exchange for keeping them alive.

Among those helping Irena is Stefan, a Jewish friend from her university days. He is aware of a few overlooked exits from the ghetto and uses this knowledge to help Irena and others involved with the underground organization Żegota plan their strategies and devise routes to smuggle the children, some in boxes hidden under bricks on wheelbarrows, others through sewer systems, and still others brazenly escorted through the front door of the city hall hand-in-hand with their savior.

Eventually Irena is arrested by the Gestapo and placed in captivity, where she undergoes interrogation accompanied by torture. However, she refuses to name those who helped her. She is sentenced to death by firing squad, but at the last moment a guard, bribed by the Polish Home Army resistance movement, frees her. After briefly visiting her ailing mother, Irena is taken to a remote rural farm, where she is reunited with Stefan.

In an epilogue, we learn Irena and Stefan eventually married and she was nominated for the Nobel Peace Prize in 2007. In a taped interview, real-life Irena discusses her wartime efforts and pays tribute to the mothers who selflessly agreed to separate from their children and the women who provided them with a safe haven.

== Cast ==
- Anna Paquin - Irena Sendler
- Marcia Gay Harden - Janina Krzyżanowska
- Goran Višnjić - Stefan
- Nathaniel Parker - Dr. Majkowski
- Michelle Dockery - Ewa Rozenfeld
- Steve Speirs - Piotr
- Iddo Goldberg - Jakub Rozenfeld
- Paul Freeman - Monsignor Godlewski
- Danny Webb - Trojan
- Krzysztof Pieczyński - Dr. Janusz Korczak
- Leigh Lawson - Rabbi Rozenfeld
- Maja Ostaszewska - Jadwiga
- Danuta Stenka - Hannah Rozenfeld
- Olga Bołądź - Zofia
- William Ellis - Wiktor
- Rebecca Windheim - Karolina Rozenfeld

== Critical reception ==
The film received the Emmy Award for Outstanding Makeup for a Miniseries or a Movie and was nominated for both Outstanding Sound Editing and Outstanding Supporting Actress (for Marcia Gay Harden).

Ginia Bellafante of The New York Times said the film "recounts her story with none of the zeal, passion, terror and chaos that her mission involved" and added, "The producers strive for a solemnity that cannot be called maudlin . . . and wind up with something that feels lazy, as if they believed the project's noble goals were enough to carry it."

John Maynard of The Washington Post observed, "Comparisons to Steven Spielberg's Schindler's List are inevitable . . . Of course, no TV movie could offer the beauty and complexity of Spielberg's Oscar-winning film, but Courageous Heart . . . is equally engaging on a smaller scale, full of small, poignant moments."

Daniel Carlson of The Hollywood Reporter said, "It's not that the telefilm is necessarily bad; it's that co-writer and director John Kent Harrison only occasionally manages to imbue the story with the requisite tension and emotional strife deserving of one of the darkest chapters in history. There are a few harrowing moments that skillfully bring home the human and emotional cost of the war, but mostly the TV movie plays like too many other things we've seen before."

Variety called the film "taut, emotional and compelling" and added, "Granted, the movie only sparingly touches upon the depth of the Nazi atrocities, and the evidence of them toward the end - brutal as it is - proves relatively tame in light of what transpired. Yet as directed by John Kent Harrison . . . there's persistent tension throughout the movie."

== See also ==
- Rescuers: Stories of Courage: Two Women (1997 film by Peter Bogdanovich)
